= Krishna filmography =

Krishna was an Indian actor, film director and film producer who worked predominantly in Telugu cinema. He has appeared in over 350 feature films in a career spanning 5 decades. Krishna made his debut in 1965 with Adurthi Subba Rao's Thene Manasulu. His third film Gudachari 116 gave him much needed recognition and he went on to appear in successful films such as Mosagallaku Mosagadu, Pandanti Kapuram, Devudu Chesina Manushulu, Alluri Seetarama Raju, Manchi Kutumbam, Ram Robert Rahim, Mundadugu, and Simhasanam among others.

Between 1964 and 1995, Krishna on an average appeared in 11 films per year. He established his production house Padmalaya Studios in 1970. In addition to acting, Krishna has directed 16 films and produced several films.

== Filmography ==
- All movies are in Telugu unless specified otherwise.

=== As actor ===
Year	Title	Role	Notes	Ref.
1961	Kula Gotralu			
1962	Padandi Munduku			
1963	Paruvu-Prathishta			
1965	Thene Manasulu	Basavaraju	First film in a lead role	
1966	Kanne Manasulu	Gangulu		
1966	Gudachari 116	Gopi (Agent 116)	First film as a solo lead	
1967	Iddaru Monagallu	Adavi Manishi (Tarzan)		
1967	Saakshi	Kishtayya		
1967	Marapurani Katha	Raghu		
1967	Stree Janma	Kishore		
1967	Upayamlo Apayam	Anand		
1967	Private Master	Krishna		
1967	Ave Kallu	Bhaskar		
1968	Asadhyudu	Raju		
1968	Niluvu Dopidi	Krishna		
1968	Manchi Kutumbam	Mohan		
1968	Circar Express			
1968	Amayakudu	Raju		
1968	Attagaru Kothakodalu	Gopi		
1968	Lakshmi Nivasam	Chandram		
1968	Nenante Nene	Ravi		
1968	Undamma Bottu Pedata	Krishna		
1968	Chelleli Kosam			
1968	Vintha Kapuram	Rajasekharam		
1969	Manchi Mitrulu	Gopi		
1969	Love in Andhra			
1969	Bhale Abbailu	Ravi		
1969	Bommalu Cheppina Katha	Mangu		
1969	Mahabaludu	Pratapasimha		
1969	Sabash Satyam	Satyam		
1969	Astulu Anthastulu	Sankar		
1969	Takkari Donga Chakkani Chukka	Gopi, Syam	Dual Role	
1969	Vichitra Kutumbam	Krishna		
1969	Muhrutha Balam	Venu		
1969	Jarigina Katha	Raghu		
1969	Jagath Kiladeelu	Anand		
1969	Annadammulu	Ramu		
1969	Karpoora Harathi	Ranganna		
1969	Bandipotu Bheemanna	Mohan		
1970	Akka Chellelu	Venu		
1970	Maa Nanna Nirdhoshi	Krishna		
1970	Malli Pelli	Venu		
1970	Vidhi Vilasam	Krishna		
1970	Amma Kosam	Gangu		
1970	Thaali Bottu	Murali		
1970	Pelli Sambandham	Raghurama Rao (Raghu)		
1970	Pelli Koothuru			
1970	Maa Manchi Akkayya	Suryam		
1970	Paga Sadista	Gopal		
1970	Agni Pariksha			
1970	Akhandudu	Sekhar		
1970	Pachhani Samsaram	Ravi		
1970	Rendu Kutumbala Katha	Raju		
1970	Allude Menalludu			
1970	Andarki Monagadu	Gopi		
1971	Prema Jeevulu	Babu		
1971	Master Kiladi			
1971	Athalu Kodallu	Raghu		
1971	Pattukunte Laksha	Raju		
1971	Nammaka Drohulu	Sekhar		
1971	Anuradha	Gopi		
1971	Bangaru Kutumbam			
1971	Mosagallaku Mosagadu	Krishna Prasad		
1971	Nenu Manishine	Gopinath (Gopi)		
1971	Chalaki Rani Kiladi Raja	Krishna		
1971	James Bond 777	Kishore		
1972	Monagadostunnadu Jagartta	Raja		
1972	Raj Mahal	Gopi		
1972	Antha Mana Manichike	Raghu		
1972	Maa Oori Monagallu			
1972	Guduputani	Vijay		
1972	Hantakulu Devanthakulu	Rajesh		
1972	Kodalupilla	Bhaskar		
1972	Menakodalu			
1972	Bale Mosagadu	Kumar Raja		
1972	Pandanti Kapuram	Ravi		
1972	Nijam Nirupista	Mohan		
1972	Inspector Bharya	Sridhar		
1972	Abbaigaru Ammaigaru	Sundar		
1972	Kattula Rattayya	Anand		
1972	Maa Inti Velugu	Kishore, Gopi	Dual Role	
1972	Praja Nayakudu	Ramu		
1972	Marapurani Talli	Madhu		
1972	Illu Illalu	Satyam		
1973	Manchi Vallaki Manchivadu	Ranga		
1973	Mallamma Katha	Vengalayya		
1973	Talli Kodukulu	Sekhar		
1973	Nindu Kutumbam	Ramu		
1973	Srivaru Maavaru	Ramesh		
1973	Puttinillu Mettinillu	Gopinath (Gopi)		
1973	Sneha Bandham			
1973	Neramu Siksha	Vijay (Vinay/Devudaiah/Picchaiah)		
1973	Devudu Chesina Manushulu	Gopi		
1973	Mamatha	Prakash		
1973	Mayadari Malligadu	Malli		
1973	Pasi Hrudayalu	Venu		
1973	Vintha Katha	Krishna		
1973	Ganga Manga	Koti		
1973	Meena	Krishna Rao (Krishna)		
1974	Galipatalu	Sathyam		
1974	Peddalu Marali	Madhav		
1974	Utthama illalu	Ravi		
1974	Alluri Seetharama Raju	Alluri Sitarama Raju	100th film	
1974	Manushulu Matti Bommalu			
1974	Radhamma Pelli	Murthy		
1974	Gowri			
1974	Adambaralu Anubandhalu	Bhaskaram		
1974	Deergha Sumangali	Ramachandra Rao, Prakash	Dual Role	
1974	Dhanavanthulu Gunavanthulu	Ananad		
1974	Intiniti Katha	Krishna		
1974	Satyaniki Sankellu			
1974	Devadasu	Devadas		
1975	Abhimanavathi	Ramu, Sreenivas	Dual Role	
1975	Kothakapuram	Chandram		
1975	Soubhagyavathi	Krishna		
1975	Cheekati Velugulu	Krishna Prasad / Venugopal		
1975	Rakthasambandhalu			
1975	Santanam Soubhagyam	Madhu		
1975	Gajula Kishtayya	Kishtayya		
1975	Devudulanti Manishi	Madhu		
1976	Padi Pantalu	Venu Gopal Rao aka Gopi		
1976	Sri Rajeswari Vilas Coffee Club	Matthew/Mutthayya		
1976	Manavoori Katha			
1976	Ramarajyamlo Rakthapasam	Venu, Gopi	Dual Role	
1976	Kolleti Kapuram	Chandram		
1976	Bhale Dongalu	Sekhar		
1976	Devude Gelichadu	Vijay		
1977	Kurukshetram	Arjuna		
1977	Savasagallu	Ramu		
1977	Eenatibandham ye Natido	Ranga		
1977	Janmajanmala Bandham	Venu/Krishna		
1977	Panchaithi	Gopi		
1977	Dongalaku Donga	Gopi		
1977	Manushulu Chesina Dongalu	Prasad		
1977	Manassakshi	Ravi		
1978	Indradhanasu	Prathap		
1978	Patnavasam	Gopi		
1978	Allari Bullodu			
1978	Annadammula Savaal	Kishore		
1978	Agent Gopi	Gopi		
1978	Dongala Dopidi	Sathyam		
1978	Mugguru Muggure	Vijay		
1978	Chalmohana Ranga	Mohan		
1978	Dongala Veta	Ramesh		
1978	Simha Garjana	Siva Varma		
1978	Cheppindi Chestha	Gopi Krishna		
1978	Kumara Raja	Rajasekharam (Vijayaraghava Bhupathi), Kumar, Raja	Triple Role	
1978	Athani Kante Ghanudu	Gopi		
1979	Moodu Puvvulu Aaru Kayalu	Gopi		
1979	Iddaru Asadhyule	Tiger Prakash		
1979	ViyyalavariKayyalu	Sekhar		
1979	Hema Hemeelu	Knight king raja		
1979	Dongalaku Savaal	Raju		
1979	Kotta Alludu	Hari		
1979	Yevadabbasommu	Vijay		
1979	Mande Gundelu	Ramu		
1979	Muthaiduva	Ravi		
1979	Sanku Teertham	Chakradhar		
1979	Burripalem Bullodu	Chittibabu		
1979	Captain Krishna	Krishna		
1979	Samajaniki Savaal	Vijay		
1980	Bhale Krishnudu	Krishna		
1980	Devudichina Koduku	Gopi		
1980	Kottapeta Rowdy	Krishna		
1980	Gharana Donga	Krishna		
1980	Mama Allulla Savaal	Rajesh		
1980	Adhrustavanthudu	Gopi		
1980	Ram Robert Rahim	Robert		
1980	Sirimalle navvindi	Prasad		
1980	Chuttalunnaru Jagratha	Ramesh, Gangulu	Dual Role	
1980	Ragile Hrudayalu	Ramu		
1980	Kiladi Krishnudu	Gopi Krishna		
1980	Bandodu - Gundamma	Anjaneyulu, Raghava	Dual Role	
1980	Hare Krishna - Hallo Radha	Krishna		
1980	Maa Inti Devatha	Murali		
1980	Ammaiki Mogudu-Mamaki Yamudu	Babulu		
1980	Allari Bava	Raja		
1980	Bangaru Bava	Bangaru		
1981	Ooruki Monagadu	Ravi		
1981	Thodu Dongalu	Krishna		
1981	Guru Sishyulu	Gopi		
1981	Rahasya Gudachari	Gopi		
1981	Bhogi Mantalu	Ramu		
1981	Bhoga Bagyalu	Krishna		
1981	Gadasari Atha-Sogasari Kodalu	Suryam		
1981	Jathagadu	Gopi		
1981	Antham Kaadidi Aarambham	Kanwarlal, Vijay	Dual Role	
1981	Mayadari Alludu			
1981	Nayudu Gari Abbai	Chandram		
1982	Bangaru Bhumi	Ravi		
1982	Bangaru Koduku	Gopi		
1982	Krishnaarjunulu	Arjun		
1982	Edi Dharmam Edi Nyayam?	Military Officer	Guest Appearance	
1982	Doctor Cine Actor	Madhu, Raju, Prabhakar, Chatrapati Sivaji	Quadruple Role	
1982	Nivuru Gappina Nippu	Gopi		
1982	Prema Nakshathram	Phanindra		
1982	Vayyari Bhamalu Vagalamari Bhartalu	Chinnababu Diwakar		
1982	Jagannatha Radhachakralu	Krishna		
1982	Pagabattina Simham	Harikrishna (Lion), Mohan Krishna, Muddu Krishna	Triple Role	
1982	Krishnavataram	Kandula Krishnvatharam		
1982	Ekalavya	Ekalavya		
1982	Shamshare Shankar	Shankar		
1982	Kalavari Samsaram	Vishnu		
1982	Eenadu	Ramaraju	200th film	
1983	Bezawada Bebbuli	Venu		
1983	Oorantha Sankranthi	Gopi		
1983	Mundadugu	Balagangadhara Tilak		
1983	Kirayi Kotigadu	Koti		
1983	Chattaniki Veyi Kallu	Prathap Kumar, Anandh	Dual Role	
1983	Adavi Simhalu	Krishna		
1983	Siripuram Monagadu	Lion, Sridhar, Anandh	Triple Role	
1983	Amayakudu Kaadhu Asadhyudu	Prasad		
1983	Ramarajyamlo Bheemaraju	Bheemaraju / Krishna Raja Kumar		
1983	Shakthi	Ramu, Krishna	Dual Role	
1983	Prajarajyam	Gopi		
1983	Lankebindelu	Gopi		
1983	Poratam	Krishna Murthy		
1984	Iddaru Dongalu	Krishna		
1984	Yuddham	Kishan, Krishna Rao	Dual Role	
1984	Raktha Sambandham	Chakravarthy, Krishna, Vijay	Triple Role	
1984	Pulijoodam			
1984	Mukhyamanthri			
1984	Nayakulaku Saval	Bharath		
1984	Kirai Alludu			
1984	Bangaru Kapuram	Gopi, Krishna, Raja Ravindra	Triple Role	
1984	Uddhandudu			
1984	Kanchu Kagada	Vikram		
1984	Dongalu Baboi Dongalu	Ramu, Krishna	Dual Role	
1985	Agni Parvatam	Jamadagni, Chandram	Dual Role	
1985	Maha Sangramam	Ravindra		
1985	Andharikante Monagadu	Ravi, Raja	Dual Role	
1985	Palnati Simham	Ghattamaneni Krishnama Naidu		
1985	Vajrayudham	Prathap / Kireeti		
1985	Pachani Kapuram	Gopi		
1985	Surya Chandra	Surya Chandra		
1985	Maha Manishi	Sambhu Prasad, Raja	Dual Role	
1986	Krishna Garadi	Nagaraju, Krishna	Dual Role	
1986	Brahmasthram	Vidya Sagar		
1986	Simhasanam	Vikrama Simha, Aditya Vardhana	Dual Role	
1986	Jayam Manade	Pinnamaneni Bose Babu		
1986	Prathibhavanthudu	Vijay		
1986	Khaidi Rudraiah	Rudramaraju "Rudrayya"		
1986	Krishna Paramathma			
1986	Naa Pilupe Prabahanajam	Prathap		
1986	Parasuramudu	Ramu/Parasuramudu		
1986	Santhi Nivasam	Ravindra (Ravi)		
1987	Thandri Kodukula Challenge	Raja		
1987	Dongodochhadu	Krishna (Kisthayya)		
1987	Makutamleni Maharaju	Pardhasaradhi		
1987	Tene Manasulu	Krishnamohan (Krishna)		
1987	Sardar Krishnama Naidu	Krishnamanaidu, Vijay	Dual Role	
1987	Trimurtulu		Cameo	
1987	Muddayi	Nagendra		
1987	Shankharavam	Vijay, Vikram	Dual Role	
1987	Vishwanatha Nayakudu	Viswanatha Nayak	250th film	
1987	Maa Voori Magadu	Ravi		
1987	Muddu Bidda	Ravi		
1987	Donga Garu Swagatham	Rambabu		
1988	Kaliyuga Karnudu	Sarath Chandra Prasad		
1988	Chuttalabbayi	Kishtayya		
1988	Dorakani Donga	Ravi Teja		
1988	Rowdy No.1	Bhagawan		
1988	Jamadagni	Jamadagni		
1988	Aswaddhama	Aswaddhama		
1988	Maharajasri Mayagadu	Krishna		
1988	Agni Keratalu	Suryam, Kranthi Kumar	Dual Role	
1988	Mugguru Kodukulu	Phanindra		
1988	Praja Prathinidhi	Krishna Chaitanya		
1989	Rajakeeya Chadarangam	Prathap		
1989	Atha Mechina Alludu	Bhavani Prasad, Kishtayya	Dual Role	
1989	Manchi Kutumbam	Ashok		
1989	Goonda Rajyam	Raja		
1989	Parthudu	Parthasaradhi		
1989	Gudachari 117	Chandrakanth		
1989	Sahasame Naa Oopiri	Prathap		
1989	Ajatha Satruvu	Gopi Krishna		
1989	Sarvabhoumudu	Sarvabhouma		
1989	Koduku Didina Kapuram	Chakravarthy		
1989	Jayammu Nischayammu Raa	himself		
1989	Rikshawala			
1990	Inspector Rudra	Rudra		
1990	Aayudham	Kalyan kumar		
1990	Prajala Manishi	Bhargav		
1990	Anna Thammudu	Raja Krishna Prasad		
1990	Vishnu	Sri Vishnu		
1990	Nagastram	Sekhar		
1991	Parama Sivudu	Sivayya		
1991	Indra Bhavanam	Krishna		
1991	Alludu Diddina Kapuram	Gowtham		
1991	Naa Ille Naa Swargam	Sekharam		
1992	Raktha Tarpanam	Ravindra		
1993	Pachani Samsaram	Ramam		
1993	Varasudu	Dharma Teja		
1993	Rowdy Annayya	Kistayya / Sivaramakrishna		
1993	Kirayi Gunda	Krishna		
1994	Number One	Vijay		
1994	Raitu Bharatam	Ramu		
1994	Gharana Alludu	Krishna Prasad		
1994	Yamaleela	Himself	Special Appearance in the song "Jumbare"	
1994	Doragariki Donga Pellam	Raju		
1994	Yes Nenante Nene	Sriharsha, Chandram	Dual Role	
1994	Police Alludu	Prathap		
1995	Amma Donga	Chakradhar		
1995	Super Mogudu	Sathyam		
1995	Dear Brother			
1995	Real Hero	Pandu		
1995	Telugu Veera Levara	Rama Raju	300th film	
1995	Bharata Simham	Sivaji		
1996	Sampradayam	Kumaraja		
1996	Puttinti Gowravam	Siddhartha		
1996	Jagadeka Veerudu	Raraju / Jagadeka Veerudu		
1996	Pellala Rajyam			
1996	Akkum Bakkum			
1996	Rendu Kutumbala Katha	Kishore, Ramesh Chandra	Dual Role	
1996	Ramudochadu	Krishna Prasad	Cameo Appearance	
1997	Bobbili Dora	Harishchandra Prasad, Sarath Chandra Prasad, Krishna Prasad	Triple Role	
1997	Osey Ramulamma	Krishna Mohan	Cameo Appearance	
1997	Adhirindhi Guru	Malli		
1997	Encounter	Krishnanna (Comrade Krishnanna)		
1998	Sambhavam	Harsha		
1998	Vaibhavam			
1998	Prathista	Ravi		
1998	Vareva Moguda	Chakrapani		
1999	Maanavudu Daanavudu	Durga, Guna	Dual Role	
1999	Sultan	Ashok		
1999	Raja Kumarudu	Krishnamurthy	Cameo Appearance	
2000	Ravanna	Major Chowdary		
2000	Yee Taram Nehru	Nehru		
2000	Vamsi	Arjun		
2001	Dadagiri	Dada		
2001	Pandanti Samsaram	Krishnamanaidu, Rudramanaidu	Dual Role	
2002	Takkari Donga		Special appearance	
2002	Chandravamsam	Dharma Raju		
2002	Vachina Vaadu Suryudu	Chief Minister	Guest appearance	
2003	Fools	Deepti's father	Guest appearance	
2003	Taarak	Jagadish Prasad		
2004	CBI Officer			
2004	Santhi Sandesam	Jesus Christ		
2004	24 Gantalu			
2005	Evaru Nenu?			
2005	Sravanamasam	Krishna Rao		
2005	Ayodhya	Ram Prasad		
2006	Sardar Papanna			
2007	Amma Nanna Lekunte			
2007	Sri Satyanarayana Swamy	Inuganti Venkata Rama Raja Bahaddur		
2007	Gundamma Gaari Manavadu	Sabari	Guest appearance	
2007	Chandrahas	Chatrapati Shivaji	Guest appearance	
2007	Shirdi	Krishna		
2007	Satyabhama	Psychiatrist	Guest appearance	
2008	Baladur	Ramakrishna		
2009	Neramu Siksha	Bhargav		
2009	Soldier			
2009	Kanthaswamy	R. Krishna Rao	Tamil film	
2013	Sevakudu	Krishna Prasad		
2013	Sukumarudu		Cameo appearance	
2016	Sri Sri	Sripada Srinivasa Rao (Sri Sri)	Final film	

=== As a director ===
Year	Title	Director	Writer	Producer	Editor	Notes
1986	Simhasanam	Yes	Yes	Yes	Yes	
1986	Singhasan	Yes	Yes	Yes	Yes	Hindi film
1987	Kali Dada	Yes				
1987	Sankharavam	Yes				
1988	Mugguru Kodukulu	Yes				
1988	Kaliyuga Karnudu	Yes				
1989	Koduku Diddina Kapuram	Yes	Yes	Yes	Yes	
1989	Rickshawala	Yes				
1990	Anna Thammudu	Yes	Yes		Yes	
1990	Balachandrudu	Yes	Yes	Yes	Yes	
1991	Alludu Diddina Kapuram	Yes				
1991	Nagastharam	Yes				
1991	Indra Bhavanam	Yes	Yes	Yes	Yes	
1992	Raktha Tharpanam	Yes				
2001	Pandanti Samsaram	Yes	Yes		Yes	
2004	Ishq Hai Tumse	Yes	Screenplay	Yes	Yes	Hindi film
