= List of Telugu films of 1986 =

This is a list of films produced by the Tollywood (Telugu language film industry) based in Hyderabad in the year 1986.

== List of released films ==
Opening		Title	Director	Cast	Production	Ref
J A N	1	Kirathakudu	A. Kodandarami Reddy	Chiranjeevi, Suhasini, Jaggayya		
J A N	3	Krishna Garadi	Vijaya Bapineedu	Krishna, Jaya Prada, Kaikala Satyanarayana, Rao Gopala Rao		
J A N	11	Rendu Rellu Aaru	Jandhyala	Chandra Mohan, Rajendra Prasad, Rajani, Sasikala		
J A N	14	Driver Babu	Boina Subba Rao	Sobhan Babu, Radha		
J A N	31	Kondaveeti Raja	K. Raghavendra Rao	Chiranjeevi, Radha, Vijayashanti		
F E B	7	Nippulanti Manishi	S. B. Chakravarthi	Nandamuri Balakrishna, Radha		
F E B	14	Brahmastram	G. Ram Mohan Rao	Krishna, Vijayashanti		
F E B	28	Muddula Krishnaiah	Kodi Ramakrishna	Nandamuri Balakrishna, Vijayashanti, Radha		
M A R	6	Ide Naa Samadhanam	Rajachandra	Murali Mohan, Madhavi, Giribabu, Kota Srinivasa Rao		
M A R	7	Magadheerudu	Vijay Bapineedu	Chiranjeevi, Jayasudha, Chandra Mohan		
M A R	13	Swathi Muthyam	K. Vishwanath	Kamal Haasan, Radhika, Sarath Babu	Sri Venkata Krishna Films, Ramana Movies	
M A R	14	Nireekshana	Balu Mahendra	Bhanu Chander, Archana		
M A R	21	Simhasanam	Krishna Ghattamaneni	Krishna, Radha, Jaya Pradha		
M A R	21	Kashmora	N. B. Chakravarthi	Rajendra Prasad, Rajasekhar, Bhanupriya		
M A R	23	Sri Shirdi Saibaba Mahathyam	K. Vasu	Vijaya Chander, Chandra Mohan, Somayajulu, Anjali Devi, Sharath Babu	Saradhi Studios	
M A R	28	Punyasthree	Ravi Raja Pinisetty	Rajendra Prasad, Karthik, Bhavya		

=== April—June ===
Opening		Title	Director	Cast	Studio	Ref
A P R	10	Jeevana Poratam	Rajachandra	Shoban Babu, Rajinikanth, Vijayashanti		
A P R	10	Jayam Manade	K. Bapaiah	Krishna, Sridevi		
A P R	15	Seetharama Kalyanam	Jandhyala	Nandamuri Balakrishna, Rajani	Yuva Chitra Arts	
A P R	30	Pavitra	Vinay	Rajendra Prasad, Chandra Mohan, Bhanupriya		
M A Y	12	Aalapana	Vamsy	Mohan, Bhanupriya		
M A Y	16	Prathibhavanthudu	Prabhakara Reddy	Krishna, Bhanupriya		
M A Y	23	Vikram	Madhusudhan Rao	Nagarjuna, Shobana	Annapurna Studios	
M A Y	28	Veta	A. Kodandarami Reddy	Chiranjeevi, Jaya Pradha, Sumalatha, Jaggayya	Samyuktha Movies	
J U N	5	Sirivennela	K. Vishwanath	Banerjee, Suhasini, Moon Moon Sen		
J U N	5	Khaidi Rudraiah	A. Kodandarami Reddy	Krishna, Sridevi, Sharada, Nutan Prasad	Action	
J U N	20	Aadi Dampatulu	Dasari Narayana Rao	Akkineni Nageswara Rao, Jayasudha	JSK Combines	
J U N	26	Ravana Brahma	K. Raghavendra Rao	Krishnam Raju, Radha, Lakshmi, Radhika		

=== July–August ===
Opening		Title	Director	Cast	Studio	Ref
J U L	2	Anasuyamma Gari Alludu	A. Kodandarami Reddy	Nandamuri Balakrishna, Bhanupriya, Sharada	Ramakrishna Cine Studios	
J U L	26	Karu Diddina Kapuram	D. V. Narasa Raju	Nutan Prasad, Rajendra Prasad, Rama Prabha	Usha Kiran Movies	
A U G	7	Deshoddharakudu	S. S. Ravichandra	Balakrishna, Vijayashanti, Sharada	Vijayabhaskar Productions	
A U G	14	Kaliyuga Pandavulu	K. Raghavendra Rao	Daggubati Venkatesh, Khushbu	Suresh Productions	
A U G	22	Chantabbai	Jandhyala	Chiranjeevi, Suhasini, Allu Aravind, Chandra Mohan	Jyothi Art Pictures	
A U G	29	Captain Nagarjun	V. B. Rajendra Prasad	Nagarjuna, Khushbu, Rajendra Prasad, Nutan Prasad, Brahmanandam	Jagapathi Art Pictures	
S E P	5	Repati Pourulu	T. Krishna	Rajasekhar, Vijayashanti	Etaram Films	
S E P	19	Kaliyuga Krishnudu	K. Murali Mohana Rao	Nandamuri Balakrishna, Radha	Viswashanthi Enterprises	
S E P	25	Ugra Narasimham	Dasari Narayana Rao	Krishnam Raju, Jaya Prada, Mohan Babu	Tharaka Prabhu Films	
S E P	25	Srinivasa Kalyanam	Kodi Ramakrishna	Daggubati Venkatesh, Gautami, Bhanupriya	Yuva Chitra Arts	
S E P	25	Mannemlo Monagadu	Kodi Ramakrishna	Arjun, Vennela, Y. Vijaya		

=== October–December ===
Opening		Title	Director	Cast	Studio	Ref
O C T	2	Rakshasudu	A. Kodandarami Reddy	Chiranjeevi, Suhasini, Radha	Creative Commercials	
O C T	2	Papikondalu	G. Krishnamurthy	Mohan Babu, Vanithasri, Dr. M. Prabhakara Reddy, Giri Babu		
O C T	2	Padaharella Ammayi	P. S. Krishna Mohan Reddy	Rajendra Prasad, Sudha	Sri Sailaja Films	
O C T	9	Apoorva Sahodarulu	K. Raghavendra Rao	Balakrishna, Vijayashanti, Bhanupriya, Sharada	R. K. Associates	
O C T	9	Tandra Paparayudu	Dasari Narayana Rao	Krishnam Raju, Jaya Prada, Jayasudha	Annapurna Studios, Padmalaya Studios	
O C T	23	Srimathi Oka Bahumathi	Visu	Naresh, Chandra Mohan, Jayasudha		
N O V	7	Chadastapu Mogudu	Sharath	Suman, Bhanupriya, Rajesh, Subhalekha Sudhakar		
N O V	14	Brahma Rudrulu	K. Murali Mohan Rao	Akkineni Nageswara Rao, Daggubati Venkatesh, Lakshmi, Rajani	Vyjayanthi Movies	
N O V	21	Sakkanodu	V. Bhaskar Rao	Shoban Babu, Vijayashanti		
N O V	26	Ladies Tailor	Vamsee	Rajendra Prasad, Archana		
N O V	27	Dhairyavanthudu	Lakshmi Deepak	Chiranjeevi, Vijayashanti	Deepak Raj Pictures	
D E C	4	Santhi Nivasam	Gullapalli Ram Mohana Rao	Krishna, Suhasini, Radhika Sarathkumar	Rajalakshmi Movies	
D E C	13	Jailu Pakshi	Kodi Ramakrishna	Sobhan Babu, Radhika Sarathkumar, Sumalatha	Sri Sarathi Studios	
D E C	18	Chanakya Shapadham	K. Raghavendra Rao	Chiranjeevi, Vijayashanti, Rao Gopal Rao, Annapoorna	D. V. S. Productions	
D E C	29	Aranyakanda	Kranthi Kumar	Nagarjuna, Radhika, Charanraj	Ushodaya Enterprises	
