= Chattaniki Veyi Kallu =

1983 Telugu action drama film by Vijaya Nirmala

- Directed by: Vijaya Nirmala
- Produced by: Kanuri Ranjith Kumar
- Starring: Krishna Ghattamaneni; Jayasudha; Madhavi; Rao Gopala Rao
- Edited by: Adurthi Haranath
- Music by: Chakravarthy
- Production company: Ranjith Arts
- Release date: 31 March 1983
- Country: India
- Language: Telugu

Chattaniki Veyi Kallu (transl. The law has 1000 eyes) is a 1983 Indian Telugu-language action drama film directed by Vijaya Nirmala starring Krishna Ghattamaneni, Jayasudha, Madhavi and Rao Gopala Rao. Krishna enacted dual roles of Pratap and Anand.

== Cast ==
- Krishna Ghattamaneni as Prathap Kumar & Anandh (Dual Role)
- Jayasudha as Savithri/Maya Devi
- Madhavi as Jyothi, 'Heccharika' paper reporter
- Rao Gopala Rao as Kitukula Damodara Swamy aka K.D. Swamy
- Allu Ramalingaiah as Simhadri
- Giribabu as Gurunatham
- Nutan Prasad as Maavullayya
- Ravi Kondala Rao as 'Heccharika' paper editor
- Tyagaraju as Ramji
- Jayamalini as Swapna
- Nirmala as Prathap Kumar & Anandh's mother
- Rajanala as Rangaiah, Commissioner of Police
- Kanta Rao as Raghunath, Commissioner of Police
- Mikkilineni as Police Chief
- Jayabhaskar as Inspector Suresh

== Music ==
The film's soundtrack was scored and composed by Chakravarthy.

1. "Kougili Isthe" - S. P. Balasubrahmanyam, S. Janaki
2. "Enno Poddula" - S.P.B., P. Susheela
3. "Kota Asalaa" - S.P.B.
4. "Na Jilugupaita" - P. Susheela
5. "Buchi Balra" - S.P.B., P. Susheela
6. "Ide Naa Jeevitha" - P. Susheela
