= Devudu Chesina Manushulu =

Devudu Chesina Manushulu (lit. 'People of God') may refer to these Indian Telugu-language films:

- Devudu Chesina Manushulu (1973 film)
- Devudu Chesina Manushulu (2012 film)
  - Devudu Chesina Manushulu (soundtrack), by Raghu Kunche
