= Hema Hemeelu =

- Theatrical release poster
- Directed by: Vijaya Nirmala
- Screenplay by: Vijaya Nirmala
- Story by: Tripuraneni Maharadhi
- Produced by: S. Raghunath; Krishna (Presents)
- Starring: Akkineni Nageswara Rao; Krishna; Vijaya Nirmala; Zarina Wahab
- Cinematography: Puphtala Gopi Krishna
- Edited by: Adurthi Harinath
- Music by: Ramesh Naidu
- Production company: Sri Vijaya Krishna Movies
- Release date: 23 March 1979
- Running time: 156 minutes
- Country: India
- Language: Telugu

Hema Hemeelu (transl. One greater than the other) is a 1979 Indian Telugu-language action film directed by Vijaya Nirmala. It stars Akkineni Nageswara Rao, Krishna, Vijaya Nirmala and Zarina Wahab, with music composed by Ramesh Naidu. It was produced by S. Raghunath and presented by Krishna under the Sri Vijaya Krishna Movies banner. It was dubbed and released in Tamil as Vaira Kireedam in 1980.

== Plot ==
The film revolves around a valuable heritage diamond crown from a royal dynasty. Its heritor Raja Ranga Prasad leads a happy family life with his wife, Rajeswari Devi, their twin sons, Raghuveer and Ramachandra, and a baby girl Vijaya. Diwanji Sivaramaiah is a faithful & devoted person who lives with his wife Parvati, son Raja, and daughter Seeta. Bhujangam, the heinous brother-in-law of Ranga Prasad, tries to seize the crown, for which he abducts Ranga Prasad and attacks to destroy the royal dynasty. Knowing it, Diwanji rushes to rescue the heirs; in that mishap, everyone gets detached: Diwanji, Rajeswari Devi, Raghuveer, and Vijaya drop on one side and Parvati, Ramachandra, and Seeta to another, whereas Raja is raised by a wise person, Srinivasa Rao. Years roll by, and Raghuveer flames up to avenge the homicides of his father; in that process, he turns into a daredevil gangster, Red Lion, with several associates, Ganagaram and Lilly. Meanwhile, another dreadful gangster, Black Cat, supposed to be Bhujangam's son, finds out that the crown is secured in a bank locker and purloins it. During that time, the Bank Agent is slain out by him, who is Raja's foster father.

Thereupon, the Red Lion winds up the Black Cat acquires and conceals the crown. Being cognizant of his father's death, Raja bursts out and arrives as one more gangster with an identity as Knight King. Here, Black Cat falsifies Knight King by posing Red Lion as the culprit when rivalry arises. Once in combat, the Black Cat backstabs Raghuveer, and he dies. During that plight, desperate Diwanji, fortunately, spots Ramachandra, the identical twin of Raghuveer, who has just married Seeta. Immediately, Diwanji lifts him, reveals the entire story, and trains and replaces him with Raghuveer. Parallelly, Raja and Vijaya get acquainted and fall in love. After some time, Ramachandra learns about the activities of Red Lion, also mistakes Knight King for the slaughterer, and decides to move in his brother's footsteps. Eventually, grief-stricken Seeta lands in search of her husband when Black Cat hooks her, and Raja rescues her. After that, he identifies her as his sister and aims to get back her husband. At present, Raja discovers Raghuveer is only Seeta's husband, Ramachandra, and Ramachandra knows about the love affair between Raja and Vijaya. There onwards, both of them tangle with each other, but ultimately, the truth comes forward. Finally, the movie ends with Red Lion & Knight King eliminating Black Cat and shielding the crown.

== Cast ==
- Akkineni Nageswara Rao as Red Lion Raghuveer & Rama Chandra (dual role)
- Krishna as Knight King Raja
- Vijaya Nirmala as Vijaya
- Zarina Wahab as Seeta
- Satyanarayana as Black Cat
- Giri Babu as Gangaram
- Gummadi as Diwaji Sivaramaiah
- Allu Ramalingaiah as Hotel Manager Krishnaiah
- Padmanabham as Gajachary
- Mikkilineni as Raja Ranga Prasad
- Thyagaraju as Bhujangam
- P. J. Sarma as Bank Agent Srinivasa Rao
- Pandari Bai as Rajeswari Devi
- Rama Prabha as Ritha
- Pushpa Kumari as Parvathi
- Jayamalini as Lilly
- Helen as item number

== Soundtrack ==
Music was composed by Ramesh Naidu.

Song title	Lyrics	Singers	length
"Nuvvante Naakentho"	C. Narayana Reddy	S. P. Balasubrahmanyam, S. P. Sailaja	3:32
"Andalasilpam"	Veturi	S. P. Balasubrahmanyam, P. Susheela	3:08
"Avvai Chuvvai"	Veturi	S. P. Balasubrahmanyam, P. Susheela	4:44
"Nee Kola Kallaku"	Veturi	S. P. Balasubrahmanyam, P. Susheela	3:24
"Ey Ooru"	Veturi	S. P. Balasubrahmanyam, P. Susheela	3:17
"Charminaru Kaada"	C. Narayana Reddy	S. P. Balasubrahmanyam, Anand	2:58
"Punnami Vennela"	Acharya Aatreya	S. P. Balasubrahmanyam	3:36
