= Bezawada Bebbuli =

1983 film by Vijaya Nirmala

- Poster
- Directed by: Vijaya Nirmala
- Produced by: Atluri Tulasidas
- Starring: Krishna; Radhika; Sivaji Ganesan; Sowkar Janaki
- Music by: K. Chakravarthy
- Distributed by: Sri Vijay Rama Pictures
- Release date: 14 January 1983
- Country: India
- Language: Telugu

Bezawada Bebbuli (transl. The Tiger of Bezawada) is a 1983 Indian Telugu-language film, directed by Vijaya Nirmala and produced by Atluri Tulasidas. The film stars Krishna, Radhika, Sivaji Ganesan and Sowkar Janaki. It features a musical score by K. Chakravarthy.

== Cast ==
- Krishna as Venu
- Radhika as Lata
- Shivaji Ganesan as Ravindra and ASP Raghu
- Vijaya Nirmala
- Sripriya as Madhavi
- Sowkar Janaki
- Kaikala Satyanarayana as Govardhan
- Veerabhadra Rao as Achari
- Mikkilineni as Veerabhadra Gajapati
- Peketi Sivaram
- Sakshi Ranga Rao
- Mada as Inspector
- Chitti Babu
- Baby Shalini
