= Macha Rekai =

1950 film by P. Pullaiah

- Theatrical release poster
- Directed by: P. Pullayya
- Story by: Thanjai N. Ramaiah Dass
- Produced by: T. R. Mahalingam
- Starring: T. R. Mahalingam; S. Varalakshmi
- Cinematography: Jithan Banerjee; G. Vittal Rao
- Edited by: T. M. Lal
- Music by: C. R. Subburaman
- Production company: Sukumar Productions
- Release date: 11 August 1950
- Country: India
- Language: Tamil

Macha Rekai is a 1950 Indian Tamil-language film directed by P. Pullayya and produced by T. R. Mahalingam. It is based on Thanjai N. Ramaiah Dass' play of the same name. The film stars Mahalingam, S. Varalakshmi, Santha Kumari, B. R. Panthulu, Kumari Kamala and C. T. Rajakantham. It is also the feature film debut of Vijaya Nirmala, who portrays the younger version of Mahalingam's character. The film was released on 11 August 1950 and became a moderate success.

== Cast ==
- T. R. Mahalingam as Macharaju
  - Vijaya Nirmala as young Macharaju
- S. Varalakshmi
- Santha Kumari
- B. R. Panthulu
- Kumari Kamala
- C. T. Rajakantham

== Production ==
Macha Rekai was a play written by Thanjai N. Ramaiah Dass. Upon seeing the play, actor T. R. Mahalingam decided to produce and star in its film adaptation. The adaptation, also titled Macha Rekai, was directed by P. Pullayya and produced by Mahalingam under the banner Sukumar Productions. Mahalingam portrayed the male lead Macharaju, and Nirmala (who later became known as Vijaya Nirmala) made her acting debut portraying the character's younger self. The original female lead was Anjali Devi, who left after filming a few scenes, and was replaced by S. Varalakshmi. The film's story and dialogues were written by Ramaiah Dass. Cinematography was handled by Jithan Banerjee and G. Vittal Rao and editing by T. M. Lal.

== Soundtrack ==
The soundtrack was composed by C. R. Subburaman, while Thanjai N. Ramaiah Dass was lyricist.

Song title	Singers	Length
"Vaan Mevum Nilaave"	S. Varalakshmi	02:54
"Kalai Maanaip Pola"	T. R. Mahalingam	01:41
"Manam Magizhave"	P. Leela	02:31
"Ellam Irunthenna... Aaadharavilaa"	T. R. Mahalingam & S. Varalakshmi	03:05
"Devi Jaganmaathaa"	T. R. Mahalingam	02:32
"Antho Puvimel Adimaiyaaga"	T. R. Mahalingam	03:00
"Brindavanampol Engum Kanuthe"		
"Vin Mel Thavazhnthu Sellum"	T. R. Mahalingam	
"Nilaiyillatha Ulagamithe"	A. G. Rathnamala	
"Raththa Veri Konda"		
"Raja En Mel Kobama"	A. P. Komala	
"Odathe Unnai Vida Matten"	T. R. Mahalingam & S. Varalakshmi	
"Maname Mayaginen Mannavane"	S. Varalakshmi	
"Kanavilum Maravene Naan"	T. R. Mahalingam & S. Varalakshmi	
"Androru Naal Unthan"	T. R. Mahalingam	

== Release ==
Macha Rekai was released on 11 August 1950. The film was distributed by Kumaravel Pictures in North Arcot, South Arcot, Chengelpet and Chittoor, and by Dhanalakshmi Films in Salem. It was a moderate success.
