= Maha Shaktimaan =

Maha Shaktimaan 3D
- Directed by: Swamy V.S.R.
- Starring: Raj Babbar; Meenakshi Sheshadri
- Cinematography: Sarath
- Edited by: D. Venkataratnam
- Music by: Bappi Lahiri
- Release date: 1985
- Country: India
- Language: Hindi

Maha Shaktimaan is a 1985 Indian Hindi-language 3D film by Swamy V.S.R. and produced by P. Babji. It stars Raj Babbar and Meenakshi Sheshadri.

== Plot ==
King Purushottam Singh rules over his kingdom fairly. He lives with his family; his wife, Ahilya, an adult son, and a new-born baby, Ajay. His enemy Maharudra attacks the kingdom and Purushottam's army can not protect the kingdom, and his elder son is killed. Maharudra captures power and rules over the region mercilessly. Maharudra commits massacre and terrorises the whole kingdom.

Other Kings also surrender to his might. Years later, Maharudra is still the ruler, but quite unknown to him, rebels are organising a war against him. Prince Ajay Singh, that baby son of former king Purushottam is leading them. Ajay's friend, Pratap; Pratap's lover Padmini and a lady Madhuri are with Ajay.

== Cast ==
- Raj Babbar as Prince Ajay Singh
- Meenakshi Sheshadri as Madhuri
- Karan Shah as Prince Pratap
- Kim as Padmini
- Danny Denzongpa as Maharudra
- Ranjeet as Bhairav
- Urmila Bhatt as Maharani Ahilya Singh
- Pradeep Kumar as Maharaja Purushottam Singh
- Praveen Kumar as Betaal
- Jayamalini as Dancer

== Soundtrack ==
Lyricist: Indeevar

Song	Singer
"Ang Ang Mein Chhand Bhare Hain"	Kavita Krishnamurthy, K. J. Yesudas
"Gali Gali Men Tujhe Dhoonda Sanam"	Shabbir Kumar, Asha Bhosle
"Mamalu Mamalu O Papalu Papalu"	Asha Bhosle
"Akhtar Akhtar"	Asha Bhosle
