= Mugguru Kodukulu =

- Movie poster
- Directed by: Krishna
- Written by: Paruchuri Brothers (dialogues)
- Screenplay by: Krishna
- Story by: Bhishetty Lakshmana Rao; P. Chandra Shekar Reddy
- Produced by: Ghattamaneni Nagarathnamma
- Starring: Krishna; Ramesh Babu; Mahesh Babu; Radha; Sonam
- Cinematography: V. S. R. Swamy
- Edited by: Krishna
- Music by: Chakravarthy
- Production company: Padmalaya Studios
- Release date: 20 October 1988
- Running time: 153 minutes
- Country: India
- Language: Telugu

Mugguru Kodukulu (transl. Three sons) is a 1988 Indian Telugu-language action drama film directed by Krishna. The film stars Krishna himself alongside his real-life children, Ramesh Babu and Mahesh Babu. Radha, and Sonam play the female leads. The film was produced by Ghattamaneni Nagarathnamma under the Padmalaya Studios banner. Music was composed by Chakravarthy. The film was a box office success.

== Cast ==
- Krishna as Phanindra
- Ramesh Babu as Rajendra
- Mahesh Babu as Surendra
- Radha as Roja
- Sonam as Sobha Rani
- Satyanarayana as Jooga Rao
- Allu Ramalingaiah as Meesala Pedda Venkata Rayudu
- Gummadi as Dharma Rao
- Murali Mohan as D.S.P. Mohan Kumar
- Nutan Prasad as Guru Murthy
- Giri Babu as Ranga Rao
- Kota Srinivasa Rao as Bhanu Murthy
- Annapoorna as Shanthamma
- Prabha as Vasundhara
- Chalapathi Rao as Chamche
- Vinod as Kumar
- Malladi as Priest
- Eeswar Rao as Captain Srikanth
- Bhimeswara Rao
- Master Shanmukha Srinivas as Young Phanindra
- Master Rajesh as Young Rajendra
- Baby Priya as Dolly

== Production ==
Krishna's mother, Nagaratnamma, registered the title Mugguru Kodukulu as she had three children. She went to writer Maharadhi to write a story, but he did not write the story for one year. She then went to Krishna, who asked the Paruchuri brothers to write a story. After being dissatisfied with their story, P. Chandra Shekar Reddy gave Krishna a one-liner story. After Krishna okayed the one-liner story, P. C. Reddy and Bhishetty Lakshmana Rao further developed the story. The entire film was shot in Ooty while Mahesh Babu was on school holidays.

== Soundtrack ==
Mugguru Kodukulu

Film score by Chakravarthy
- Released: 1988
- Genre: Soundtrack
- Length: 32:52
- Label: LEO Audio
- Producer: Chakravarthy

Chakravarthy chronology
| Manchi Donga (1988) | Mugguru Kodukulu (1988) | Yuddha Bhoomi (1988) |

Music was composed by Chakravarthy. Lyrics were written by Veturi. Music released on LEO Audio Company.

| S. No. | Song title | Singers | Length |
|---|---|---|---|
| 1 | "Samsarame Brundhavanam" (F) | P. Susheela, Lalitha Sagari, Sunanda | 4:16 |
| 2 | "Tingu Rangado" | S. P. Balasubrahmanyam, S. Janaki | 4:32 |
| 3 | "Night Clubulo" | S. P. Balasubrahmanyam, Lalitha Sagari | 4:10 |
| 4 | "Tokategina Galipatam Raa" | S. P. Sailaja | 5:25 |
| 5 | "Zoom Kislaba" | S. P. Balasubrahmanyam, S. Janaki | 4:35 |
| 6 | "Yevaruleni Chota" | S. P. Balasubrahmanyam, S. Janaki | 5:53 |
| 7 | "Samsarame Brundhavanam" (M) | S. P. Balasubrahmanyam, S.P. Sailaja | 4:01 |
