= Ajatha Satruvu =

1989 film by Vijaya Nirmala

- Directed by: Vijaya Nirmala
- Written by: Girija Sribhagavan; Vijaya Nirmala; Satyanand
- Produced by: P. Padmanabham
- Starring: Krishna; Radha
- Music by: Shankar–Ganesh
- Production company: Makkal Thilagam Movies
- Release date: 20 July 1989
- Country: India
- Language: Telugu

Ajatha Satruvu (transl. Without any enemies) is a 1989 Indian Telugu-language action drama film directed by Vijaya Nirmala starring Krishna and Radha in the lead roles. The Shankar–Ganesh duo composed the film's soundtrack. The film was produced by P. Padmanabham for Makkal Thilagam Movies.

== Cast ==
- Krishna as Gopi Krishna
- Radha as Radha
- Jaggayya as Raghavaiah Naidu
- Giri Babu as Sivaram
- Kota Srinivasa Rao as Papaala Parandhamaiah
- Suthi Velu as Anand Rao
- Annapurna
- Y. G. Mahendra (voiced by Rallapalli) as Chanti Babu
- Nirmalamma as Kasulamma
- Anuradha as Lalasa
- Prabhakar Reddy as Durga Prasad
- Tyagaraju as Chengaiah

== Release ==
The film received U Certificate from the Madras regional office of the censor board with the certificate dated 12 December 1988. The film was released on 20 July 1989.
