= Manchivallaku Manchivadu =

- Film poster
- Directed by: K. S. R. Das
- Written by: S. Bhavanarayana (story); Palagummi Padmaraju; Appalacharya (dialogue)
- Produced by: S. Bhavanarayana
- Starring: Krishna; Satyanarayana; Vijayanirmala; M. Prabhakar Reddy; Nagesh
- Cinematography: V. S. R. Swamy
- Edited by: K. Gopala Rao
- Music by: Satyam
- Production company: Sri Venkateswara Art Pictures
- Distributed by: Poorna Pictures Private Limited
- Release date: 13 January 1973
- Country: India
- Language: Telugu

Manchivallaku Manchivadu (transl. Good man for good people) is a 1973 Telugu action film, directed by K. S. R. Das and produced by S. Bhavanarayana. The film had musical score by Satyam. The action scenes were shot in the villages of Rajasthan.

== Cast ==
- Krishna - Ranga
- Satyanarayana - Sethupati
- Vijayanirmala - Tupaki Saakhi
- M. Prabhakar Reddy -Jaggu
- Tyagaraju - Singh
- Nagesh - Obaiah
- Jaggarao
- Rao Gopal Rao - Ramalingam
- Saakshi Ranga Rao - Gangu
- C. H. Narayana Rao - Chennakesavaiah
- Nirmala - Santhi
- Udayalakshmi
- Shabnam
- Valluri Balakrishna
- Gokina Rama Rao - Nagama Naidu

== Soundtrack ==
The soundtrack of the film was composed by Satyam and written by Daasarathi, C. Narayana Reddy, Aarudhra and Sri Sri.

Track List
No.	Title	Lyrics	Music	Singer(s)	Length
1.	"Emayyo monagaadaa"	Dasarathi	Satyam	L.R.Eswari	03:47
2.	"Pilla Shokillaa"	C. Narayana Reddy	Satyam	S. Janaki, S. P. Balasubrahmanyam	04:03
3.	"Vendi Mabbu Vidichindi"	Aarudhra	Satyam	S. P. Balasubrahmanyam	04:32
4.	"Leanea leadaa antham"	Sri Sri	Satyam	S. P. Balasubrahmanyam
