= V. S. R. Swamy =

Indian cinematographer

- Born: July 15, 1935; Valivarthipadu, Krishna district, Andhra Pradesh, India
- Died: November 11, 2008 (aged 73); Machilipatnam, Andhra Pradesh, India
- Occupations: Cinematographer, Director, Producer
- Years active: 1960s–2008

V. S. R. Swamy (15 July 1935 – 11 November 2008) was an Indian cinematographer known for his work in Telugu cinema. Over a career spanning four decades, he worked on around 250 films and played a key role in advancing the use of technology in the industry, particularly in colour, cinemascope, and 70 mm formats.

Swamy was skilled in both black-and-white and colour cinematography, shaping several landmark Telugu films. Some of his most notable works include Mosagallaku Mosagadu (1971), Alluri Sitarama Raju (1974), Siri Siri Muvva (1976), Khaidi (1983), Simhasanam (1986), Aditya 369 (1991), Narasimha Naidu (2001), and Indra (2002). He received the Nandi Award for Best Cinematographer for Viswanatha Nayakudu (1987).

Swamy directed and produced films in Telugu and Hindi. He mentored upcoming cinematographers, leaving an impact on the next generation of talent in the industry.

== Life and career ==
Swamy was born in Valivarthipadu village, Gudivada mandal, Krishna district, Andhra Pradesh. He developed a passion for photography from a young age and honed his skills under the mentorship of C. Nageswara Rao. Early in his career, he worked with cinematographers such as Ravikant Nagaich and S. Shankar. Swamy worked as a camera operator on films like Bandipotu (1963) and Veerabhimanyu (1965). Swamy established his reputation and became a registered member of the Western India Cinematographers Association (WICA), a prestigious achievement at the time for aspiring cameramen.

He made his debut as a cinematographer with the film Asadhyudu (1968), starring Krishna and directed by V. Ramachandra Rao. His work in the film, particularly his innovative camera handling led to further opportunities in the Telugu film industry.

=== Notable works ===
Swamy was known for his creative and technical expertise. His work on Kathanayakudu (1969), directed by K. Hemambaradhara Rao, was praised for its innovative use of colour and camera angles. A notable example was a shot through N. T. Rama Rao's boots in the song "Inthenaya Telusukovaya," which gained attention for its unique visual impact.

Swamy played a key role in enhancing many films, including his collaboration with Padmalaya Studios. During the production of Alluri Sitarama Raju (1974), Swamy suggested filming in CinemaScope, a cutting-edge format at the time. Following his recommendation, Krishna imported the necessary lenses from Mumbai, allowing the film to be shot in this format, which improved its visual appeal.

Swamy's cinematography contributed to the success of many blockbuster films, including Mosagallaku Mosagadu (1971), Bhakta Tukaram (1973), Devudu Chesina Manushulu (1973), Alluri Sitarama Raju (1974), Bhakta Kannappa (1976), Siri Siri Muvva (1976), Khaidi (1983), Kondaveeti Donga (1990), Aditya 369 (1991), Rowdy Inspector (1992), Samarasimha Reddy (1999), Narasimha Naidu (2001), and Indra (2002).

He was recognized for his work on Simhasanam (1986), the first Telugu film shot in 70mm. His technical ingenuity was evident in films like Mosagallaku Mosagadu, Alluri Sitarama Raju, and Aditya 369 where he created visual effects without modern technology.

In 1987, Swamy received the Nandi Award for Best Cinematographer for his work on Viswanatha Nayakudu.

=== Direction and production ===
Swamy directed films like the Telugu film Apadbhandavulu (1982) and the Hindi 3D film Maha Shaktimaan (1985). He ventured into film production, acting as a presenter for Edureeta (1977) and producing Kaliyuga Sthree (1978).

== Legacy ==
Several noted cinematographers, including M. V. Raghu, S. Gopal Reddy, and C. Ramprasad, assisted Swamy early in their career. S. Gopal Reddy worked as an assistant to Swamy for nine years. Swamy played a role in shaping the next generation of talent in the Telugu film industry. He is remembered for his expertise in both black-and-white and colour cinematography and his contributions to technical advancements in the field.

== Death ==
Swamy died at the age of 70 on 12 November 2008 at Machilipatnam due to cardiac arrest.

== Filmography ==
Movie	Year	Language	Notes
1968	Asadhyudu	Telugu	
1969	Katha Nayakudu	Telugu	
1971	Mosagallaku Mosagadu	Telugu	
1972	Balle Mosagaadu	Telugu	
1973	Manchivallaku Manchivadu	Telugu	
1973	Bhakta Tukaram	Telugu	
1973	Devudu Chesina Manushulu	Telugu	
1973	Andala Ramudu	Telugu	
1974	Alluri Seetharama Raju	Telugu	
1976	Bhakta Kannappa	Telugu	
1976	Mahakavi Kshetrayya	Telugu	
1976	Siri Siri Muvva	Telugu	
1978	Vichitra Jeevitham	Telugu	
1981	Itni Si Baat	Hindi	
1982	Yuvaraju	Telugu	
1985	Chattamtho Poratam	Telugu	
1985	Donga	Telugu	
1985	Maha Shaktimaan	Hindi	
1985	Pataal Bhairavi	Hindi	
1986	Simhasanam	Telugu	
1986	Veta	Telugu	
1986	Khaidi Rudrayya	Telugu	
1986	Singhasan	Hindi	
1987	Viswanatha Nayakudu	Telugu	
1989	Dost	Hindi	
1990	Kondaveeti Donga	Telugu	
1990	Jamai Raja	Hindi	
1990	Lorry Driver	Telugu	
1991	Aditya 369	Telugu	
1992	Rowdy Inspector	Telugu	
1992	Chinarayudu	Telugu	
1992	President Gari Pellam	Telugu	
1994	Gangmaster	Telugu	
1995	Maatho Pettukoku	Telugu	
1995	Street Fighter	Telugu	
1997	Adavilo Anna	Telugu	
1999	Samarasimha Reddy	Telugu	
2000	Vamsoddharakudu	Telugu	
2001	Narasimha Naidu	Telugu	
2001	Bhalevadivi Basu	Telugu	
2002	Seema Simham	Telugu	
2002	Kondaveeti Simhasanam	Telugu	
2002	Indra	Telugu	
2003	Anaganaga O Kurradu	Telugu	
2003	Palanati Brahmanaidu	Telugu	
2004	Lakshmi Narasimha	Telugu	
2004	Adavi Ramudu	Telugu	

== Awards ==
- Nandi Award for Best Cinematographer - Viswanatha Nayakudu (1987)
