= Vichitra Kutumbam =

Indian Telugu-language comedy film

- Theatrical release poster
- Directed by: K. S. Prakash Rao
- Screenplay by: Bhamidipati Radhakrishna
- Story by: Sarad Pilgankar
- Produced by: V. K. P. Sunkavalli
- Starring: N. T. Rama Rao; Savitri; Krishna; Shobhan Babu; Vijaya Nirmala
- Cinematography: R. Sampath
- Edited by: R. Devarajan
- Music by: T. V. Raju
- Production company: Sriraj Art Films
- Release date: 28 May 1969
- Running time: 171 minutes
- Country: India
- Language: Telugu

Vichitra Kutumbam (transl. Strange family) is a 1969 Indian Telugu-language comedy film, produced by V. K. P. Sunkavalli under the Sriraj Art Films banner and directed by K. S. Prakash Rao. It stars N. T. Rama Rao, Savitri, Krishna, Shobhan Babu and Vijaya Nirmala, with music composed by T. V. Raju. A remake of this film in Hindi with Dilip Kumar was shelved.

== Cast ==
- N. T. Rama Rao as Raja Shekaram
- Savitri as Kamala
- Krishna as Krishna
- Shobhan Babu as Raghava
- Vijaya Nirmala as Radha
- Nagabhushanam as Nagaraju
- Raja Babu as Bhulokam
- Prabhakar Reddy as Singanna
- Mikkilineni as Judge
- Vangara as Lawyer Padmanabha Sastry
- Dr. Sivaramakrishnaiah as Lawyer
- Ramachandra Rao as Bheemudu
- Ch. Krishna Murthy as Secretary
- Sheela as Julie
- Pushpa Kumari as Susheela
- Sandhya Rani as Mallika
- Meena Kumari as Subbulu
- Malathi as Kamala's mother
- Vijayalalitha as item number
- Jyothi Lakshmi as item number

== Soundtrack ==
Music composed by T. V. Raju. Lyrics were written by C. Narayana Reddy.

Song title	Singers	length
"Rangu Rangu Poolu"	Ghantasala, P. Susheela,	3:20
"Savaal Kaachuko Savaal"	Ghantasala, L. R. Eswari	3:18
"Aadave Aadave"	Ghantasala, P. Susheela	4:16
"Pothunnavaa"	P. Susheela	3:48
"Erra Erranidaana"	Pithapuram, L. R. Eswari	3:20
"Naluguru Navverura"	P. Susheela	5:34
"Voopulo Vunnavu"	L. R. Eswari, Pattabhi	4:31
