= Siripuram Monagadu =

1983 Telugu action film by K. S. R. Das

- Directed by: K. S. R. Das
- Written by: M. S. Chakravarthy; Paruchuri Brothers
- Produced by: Srikanth Nahata
- Starring: Krishna; Jaya Prada; K. R. Vijaya; Kaikala Satyanarayana; Nutan Prasad; Kantha Rao
- Cinematography: S. V. Srikanth
- Edited by: D. Venkataratnam
- Music by: Satyam
- Production company: Srikanth Pictures
- Release date: 1 June 1983
- Country: India
- Language: Telugu

Siripuram Monagadu (transl. Siripuram Chieftain) is an Indian Telugu-language action film released on 1 June 1983 starring Krishna in triple roles of Sridhar, Anand and Lion alongside Jaya Prada, K. R. Vijaya, Kaikala Satyanarayana, Nutan Prasad and Kantha Rao in the lead roles. The film was produced by Srikanth Nahata for Srikanth Pictures.

The film and its soundtrack album were scored and composed by Satyam, had its cinematography and editing handled by S. V. Srikanth, and D. Venkataratnam respectively. M. S. Chakravarthy wrote the story while Paruchuri Brothers penned the dialogues. The film was recorded as a Superhit at the box office.

== Cast ==
- Krishna as Sridhar, Ananad and Lion (Triple Role)
- Jaya Prada
- K. R. Vijaya
- Kaikala Satyanarayana
- Nutan Prasad
- Kantha Rao
- Suttivelu
- Sutti Veerabhadra Rao
- Tyagaraju
- Vallam Narasimha Rao
- Kashinath Tata
- Bheemeswara Rao
- Ch. Krishna Murthy
- Mamatha
- Kalpana Rai
- Dubbing Janaki
- Varalakshmi
- Baby Meena
- Jayamalini

== Music ==
Chellapilla Satyam scored and composed the film's soundtrack album comprising 6 tracks with Veturi Sundararama Murthy penning the lyrics.

1. "Madhuvu Maguvo" — P. Susheela
2. "Kongu Patteyana" — S. P. B.
3. "Cheetiki Maatiki" — S. P. B., P. Susheela
4. "Veyi Chukka" — S. Janaki
5. "Kuvakuva Kuvakuva" — P. Susheela, S. P. B.
6. "Ammammo Buchade" — P. Susheela
