= Balachandrudu =

- Theatrical release poster
- Directed by: Krishna
- Written by: Paruchuri Brothers (dialogues)
- Screenplay by: Krishna
- Story by: Bhishetty Lakshmana Rao
- Produced by: Krishna
- Starring: Mahesh Babu; Geetha; Satyanarayana; Sarath Kumar; Rami Reddy
- Cinematography: Pushpala Gopi Krishna
- Edited by: Krishna
- Music by: Raj–Koti
- Production company: Padmalaya Studios
- Release date: 26 September 1990
- Running time: 126 minutes
- Country: India
- Language: Telugu

Balachandrudu is a 1990 Indian Telugu-language action drama film, produced and directed by Krishna under his Padmalaya Studios banner. It stars Mahesh Babu in the title role, Satyanarayana, Geetha, Sarath Kumar, Rami Reddy in other important roles and music composed by Raj–Koti.

== Cast ==
- Mahesh Babu as Balachandra
- Satyanarayana
- Geetha as Sujatha
- Sarath Kumar as Minor Babu
- Rami Reddy as Sarangadhara Rao
- Prabhakar Reddy as Sripaada Rao
- Chandra Mohan
- Ahuti Prasad as Poorna
- Raja as Sridhar
- Babu Mohan
- Narsing Yadav
- Ananth as Constable
- Eeswar Rao as Shanmukam
- Latha Sri as Madhuri
- Disco Shanti as item number
- Tatineni Rajeswari as Saroja
- Jhansi
- Ayesha Jaleel as Poorna's wife

== Soundtrack ==
Balachandrudu

Film score by Raj–Koti
- Released: 1990
- Genre: Soundtrack
- Length: 21:36
- Label: Cauvery Audio
- Producer: Raj–Koti

Raj–Koti chronology
Shila Shasanam (1990)	Balachandrudu (1990)	Irugillu Porugillu (1990)

Music composed by Raj–Koti. Music released on Cauvery Audio Company.

S. No.	Song title	Singers	Lyrics	length
1	"Akkayya Pelli"	K. S. Chithra	C. Narayana Reddy	4:08
2	"Thaluke Thatiginathom"	K. S. Chithra	Veturi	4:49
3	"Moodu Kalla Rudrunniraa"	K. S. Chithra	Veturi	3:50
4	"Menathalanti"	K. S. Chithra	Veturi	3:29
5	"Ososi Gopikalara"	K. S. Chithra	Veturi	5:20
