= Mosagallaku Mosagadu (1971 film) =

1971 Indian Telugu-language film

- Theatrical releaseposter
- Directed by: K. S. R. Das
- Written by: Aarudra
- Produced by: G. Adiseshagiri Rao
- Starring: Krishna; Vijaya Nirmala; Nagabhushanam; Gummadi; Kaikala Satyanarayana; M. Prabhakar Reddy; Dhulipala; Jyothi Lakshmi
- Cinematography: V. S. R. Swamy
- Edited by: Kotagiri Gopala Rao
- Music by: P. Adinarayana Rao
- Production company: Padmalaya Studios
- Distributed by: Padmalaya Studios
- Release date: 27 August 1971
- Running time: 159 minutes
- Country: India
- Language: Telugu

Mosagallaku Mosagadu (transl. Deceiver of deceivers) is a 1971 Indian Telugu-language revisionist Western film directed by K. S. R. Das and written by Aarudra. Produced by G. Adiseshagiri Rao under the banner of Sri Padmalaya Films, the film features Krishna, Vijaya Nirmala, Nagabhushanam, Kaikala Satyanarayana, Gummadi, Dhulipala, M. Prabhakar Reddy, and Jyothi Lakshmi in prominent roles.

Inspired by classic Western films, Mosagallaku Mosagadu is set in the 18th century, during the anarchy following the 1757 Battle of Bobbili. The film combines historical elements with a fictional treasure hunt narrative, focusing on the search for lost treasure belonging to the Amaraveedu dynasty. It was notable for its use of Eastmancolor, marking a technical milestone for Telugu cinema, and was shot in various locations including Bikaner, Shimla, and the Thar Desert.

Released on 27 August 1971, Mosagallaku Mosagadu achieved major success, running for 100 days in multiple theatres. Considered the first Western made in India, it established Krishna as the first Telugu "cowboy" and sparked a wave of similar productions in Telugu cinema. The film was subsequently dubbed into Tamil as Mosakkaaranukku Mosakkaaran, released in a Hindi version, and also presented in a trimmed English version title Treasure Hunt. Its success also influenced the adoption of the Western genre in Hindi films.

== Plot ==
In the 18th century, the aftermath of the Battle of Bobbili (1757) is a period marked by political chaos and the intervention of British and French forces in South India. Hidden treasure of the Amaraveedu dynasty is concealed in a cave with five doors. To keep the treasure from falling into the hands of the British, two friends, Daanaala Dharmayya and Pagadaala Subbayya, hide it far away and secure it with five keys. Daanaala Dharmayya escapes to Kurnool, while Pagadaala Subbayya flees to Gadwal. The friends separate to keep the keys and the treasure safe.

Krishna Prasad, a social reformer who fights for the rights of the poor against the new government, encounters Nakkajittula Naaganna, a highway robber, who is captured and offered a reward of 1,000 gold coins for his capture. Krishna Prasad seizes the opportunity to earn money and help the poor by capturing Naaganna. He secures Naaganna with ropes and turns him in, but secretly frees him to share the loot. Krishna uses the money to aid the poor, which earns him a reputation and support from the local community.

One day, a blind man, a former servant of the Amaraveedu court who knows the location of the treasure keys, accidentally reveals this information at a highway tavern. Sathyam, a rival seeking the treasure, tortures the blind man for details about the keys. Sathyam learns about Daanaala Dharmayya in Kurnool, but kills him in his haste. Radha, Dharmayya's daughter, discovers her father dying and, misled into believing Pagadaala Subbayya is responsible for the murder, seeks revenge.

Pagadaala Subbayya, on his deathbed due to old age, reveals the treasure's location to his son and mentions that he had given the keys to Komarayya, a retired constable in Kurnool. Meanwhile, Krishna Prasad continues to earn money through his schemes involving Naaganna. He falls in love with Radha, whom he trains as a sharpshooter to help her seek revenge. Radha swears to avenge her father's death.

Radha's pursuit of revenge leads to conflicts with Bijili, a rival cowgirl who also falls for Krishna. When Naaganna attempts to steal Krishna's loot, Krishna punishes him by leaving him stranded in the desert. Naaganna, holding a grudge, joins forces with Bijili. During a confrontation in the desert, Naaganna and Bijili capture and torture Krishna. They discover a cart of corpses, among which is Pagadaala Subbayya's son. The son reveals the treasure's secret to Krishna.

Driven by greed, Naaganna adopts the identity of Pagadaala Subbayya and helps Krishna recover from his injuries. Krishna and Radha eventually escape together. Naaganna, now disguised as Subbayya, is later captured by Sathyam's gang. Krishna rescues him, and Naaganna becomes his ally once more. Radha reveals that her father used to work for Constable Komarayya, who had received one of the keys from Daanaala Dharmayya.

Krishna Prasad, Radha, and Naaganna journey to the treasure cave. A fierce battle ensues between Krishna's group and rival robbers seeking the treasure. After defeating the robbers, Krishna discovers the five sacks of treasure. He and Radha share the treasure, fulfilling their quest and restoring justice.

== Cast ==
- Krishna as Krishna Prasad
- Vijaya Nirmala as Radha
- Gummadi as Kotwal Komarayya, Krishna Prasad's Father
- Kakarala as Pagadala Subbayya
- Dhulipala as Daanala Dharmayya
- Jyothi Lakshmi as Bijili
- Nagabhushanam as Nakkajittula Naaganna
- Kaikala Satyanarayana as Sathyam
- M. Prabhakar Reddy
- Rao Gopal Rao
- S. Varalakshmi
- Santha Kumari as Krishna Prasad's Mother
- Jagga Rao
- Ramesh Babu as Young Krishna Prasad
- Sakshi Ranga Rao as Drunkard

== Production ==
=== Development ===
Following the underwhelming performance of their first production, Agni Pariksha (1970), Krishna and his production house, Padmalaya Films, sought to introduce the Western (cowboy) genre to Telugu cinema. This decision was influenced by the popularity of cowboy films being shown in Madras at the time. Krishna later stated that the purpose of the film was to give himself a new image and status. While most films at the time had a budget of around ₹3–4 lakh, Krishna allocated ₹7–8 lakh for this film, doubling the usual budget to ensure its production quality.

The film drew inspiration from Western classics such as For a Few Dollars More (1965), The Good, the Bad and the Ugly (1966), and Mackenna's Gold (1969). To adapt this genre for an Indian audience, writer Aarudra was enlisted to develop the story and dialogues. Aarudra set the narrative in the 18th century, during the aftermath of the Battle of Bobbili (1757), a time of political upheaval with British and French forces' involvement in Indian politics. The story was centered around a fictional search for the hidden Amaraveedu treasure. Despite comparisons to The Good, the Bad and the Ugly, director K. S. R. Das clarified that Mosagallaku Mosagadu was specifically adapted to suit Telugu nativity, with only one scene inspired by the Italian film. Das also mentioned that he had not seen the film himself.

=== Casting ===
Krishna was so impressed with the story that he insisted Aarudra direct the film. However, when Aarudra declined, Krishna and his brothers chose K. S. R. Das to helm the project. Das had previously directed Rowdy Rani (1970), presenting Vijaya Nirmala in an action role, and Takkaridonga Chakkani Chukka (1969), also starring Krishna and Vijaya Nirmala. This marked Das's first Telugu colour film.

Krishna starred in the lead role, with Vijaya Nirmala, Nagabhushanam, Jyothi Lakshmi, and Sathyanarayana in pivotal roles. The film also featured Krishna's eldest son, Ramesh, in a childhood role, and his youngest brother, G. Adiseshagiri Rao, in a cameo. Nagabhushanam's character, Nakkajittula Naganna, was based on Eli Wallach's "Ugly" from The Good, the Bad and the Ugly. But, Nagabhushanam added his own style, giving a lively performance that stood out. The cast underwent training in horse riding and handling firearms, with Vijaya Nirmala recalling the body aches from the riding lessons on Madras's Marina Beach.

=== Filming ===
Mosagallaku Mosagadu was shot in colour, a decision that was initially met with skepticism from distributors who preferred black-and-white films due to cost considerations. The production team ultimately decided to proceed with colour filming, despite the increased budget.

The film was shot in Eastmancolor, a technical milestone for Telugu cinema. Filming took place in diverse locations, including Bikaner, Shimla, Pondicherry, and Madras. Most of the crew traveled to Rajasthan in a specially booked train, while Krishna, Vijaya Nirmala, Jyothi Kakshmi, and Nagabhushanam flew to the location. Key desert scenes were filmed in the stretch between Bikaner to Jaisalmer. Following the shoot, the crew traveled by car from Bikaner to Shimla.

Key scenes were shot in Kufri, Narkanda, and Tattapani in Himachal Pradesh during snowfall, as well as in the Thar Desert's sand dunes in Rajasthan. Indoor scenes were filmed at Vauhini Studios. The song "Korinadi Neraverinadi" was filmed in Kufri and Narkanda, where Vijaya Nirmala performed barefoot in the snow. The cinematography by V. S. R. Swamy was praised for its innovative use of backlighting, offering Telugu audiences a fresh visual experience.

=== Make up ===
In one memorable scene, Krishna's character is left stranded in the desert, where his face appears sunburned and blistered. Cinematographer V. S. R. Swamy asked makeup artist Madhava Rao to create the blistered effect. Lacking specialized materials in the desert, Madhava Rao improvised by using pea seeds. He peeled and cut the seeds in half, then glued them to Krishna's face. This simple method created a realistic look for the scene.

== Soundtrack ==
Music is composed by P. Adinarayana Rao with lyrics written by Arudra-Appalacharya.

| No. | Title | Singer(s) | Length |
|---|---|---|---|
| 1. | "Gurini Sootiga" | L. R. Eswari | 4:10 |
| 2. | "Thakita Dhimithaka" | L. R. Eswari | 4:50 |
| 3. | "Korinadhi Neraverinadhi" | S. P. Balasubrahmanyam, P. Susheela | 4:39 |
| 4. | "Elaagunnadi Abbaaya" | S. P. Balasubrahmanyam, L. R. Eswari | 2:51 |
| 5. | "Kathilanti Pilloy" | P. Susheela | 4:57 |

== Release ==
After the film was completed, a preview in Madras received lukewarm reactions, with many predicting it would fail. Many producers in Madras were skeptical about the extravagance and budget of the film, predicting a bleak future for Padmalaya Studios. However, Mosagallaku Mosagadu was a major success, running for 100 days in multiple theatres, including a record-setting run in Bangalore. The film was completed on a budget of ₹8 lakh, shot in 28 days, and grossed ₹32 lakh upon its initial release. It was also dubbed and released in several languages, including English as Treasure Hunt, Hindi as Gunfighter Johnny, and Tamil as Mosakkaaranukku Mosakkaaran. The Tamil and Hindi versions had a good run at the box office.

The film was re-released in 4K on 31 May 2023, coinciding with Krishna's birthday. In the re-release, 19 minutes of the original film were cut, including a couple of songs and a fight sequence.

== Legacy ==
Mosagallaku Mosagadu is considered the first true Western film made in India, though a few dacoit-themed films in Hindi and other languages may have been released before 1971. The film became a trendsetter in Telugu cinema, establishing Krishna as the first Telugu "cowboy." Its innovative use of locations and action sequences played a key role in its success, leading to the rise of the cowboy genre in Telugu cinema.

Following the film's popularity, several other "Telugu cowboy" movies were produced, and Krishna signed six similar films soon after. The genre was later picked up in Hindi cinema by actors like Feroz Khan, Mithun Chakraborty, Shatrughan Sinha, and Danny Denzongpa. Krishna's son Mahesh Babu also starred in a cowboy film, Takkari Donga, in 2002.
