= Goonda Rajyam =

1989 Telugu action film by Kodi Ramakrishna

- Poster publicising the first week collections of the film
- Directed by: Kodi Ramakrishna
- Produced by: G. Venkata Raju; G. Siva Raju
- Starring: Krishna; Vijayashanti; Sarada
- Cinematography: Kodi Lakshmana Rao
- Edited by: Suresh Tata
- Music by: Raj–Koti
- Production company: Sri Vijaya Lakshmi Art Productions
- Release date: 2 March 1989
- Country: India
- Language: Telugu

Goonda Rajyam (transl. Country of Thugs) is a 1989 Indian Telugu-language action film directed by Kodi Ramakrishna, produced by G. Venkata Raju and G. Siva Raju for Sri Vijaya Lakshmi Art Productions starring Krishna Vijayashanti and Sarada. The film has musical score by Raj–Koti duo. The film was released on 2 March 1989 to positive reviews and emerged as a major commercial success.

== Cast ==
- Krishna as Raja
- Vijayashanti as Lata
- Sarada as Bhuvaneshwari Devi
- Nutan Prasad as Bhagwan Das
- Gollapudi Maruthi Rao as Bangaraiah
- Y. Vijaya
- Murali Mohan as Muralinath
- Prasad Babu as Sridhar
- Giri Babu
- Mallikarjuna Rao
- M.V.S. Haranatha Rao as Shankarananda Swamy

== Soundtrack ==
Raj–Koti duo scored and composed the film's soundtrack comprising 5 tracks. Veturi Sundararama Murthy, C. Narayana Reddy and Jonnavithhula Ramalingeswara Rao penned the lyrics.

1. "Chakkani Gaajuluni" — S. P. Balasubrahmanyam., S. Janaki
2. "Aa Neelikondallo" — S. P. B., S. Janaki
3. "Nenera" — S. P. B.
4. "Maguvala" — S. Janaki
5. "Pilla Pilla Malle Mogga" — S. Janaki, S. P. B.
