= Khaidi Rudrayya =

1986 Telugu action drama film by Kodandarami Reddy

- Directed by: A. Kodandarami Reddy
- Written by: Paruchuri Brothers; A. Kodandarami Reddy
- Produced by: T. Trivikrama Rao
- Starring: Krishna; Sridevi; Sarada; Rao Gopala Rao
- Cinematography: V. S. R. Swamy
- Edited by: Kotagiri Venkateswara Rao
- Music by: K. Chakravarthy
- Production company: Vijaya Lakshmi Art Pictures
- Release date: 5 June 1986
- Country: India
- Language: Telugu

Khaidi Rudrayya (transl. Prisoner Rudrayya) is a 1986 Indian Telugu-language action drama film directed by A. Kodandarami Reddy who also wrote the screenplay for a story by Paruchuri Brothers; produced by T. Trivikrama Rao for Vijaya Lakshmi Art Pictures. The film stars Krishna in the title role alongside Sridevi and Sarada with Rao Gopala Rao enacting the main antagonist. The film was recorded as a superhit at the box office.

The film has musical score by K. Chakravarthy. The film marked the last collaboration of Kodandarami Reddy-Krishna-Sridevi trio though Reddy and Krishna worked together one last time in Sardar Krishnama Naidu. The film was remade in Hindi as Waqt Ki Awaz (1988) with Sridevi reprising her role.

== Plot ==
Rudramaraju, alias Rudrayya is arrested for brutally hacking a local thug. The judge however frees him with some hidden agenda. It is revealed that Rudrayya had given shelter to Latha, the adopted daughter of a wealthy Eswara Rao, when the latter was forced into marrying the good-for-nothing Venkatagiri by her uncle Phanibhushan Rao.

Phanibhushan unsuccessfully persuades her in returning to her estate. His plot to take her forcefully is thwarted by Rudrayya, leading to his goons kidnapping and murdering Rudrayya's sister, Lakshmi, in retaliation. Rudrayya killed one of those thugs in the beginning and now proceeds to finish off Rao and his sidekick, Kotigadu.

He learns from Yasodhara Devi who has resigned her position that the same goons had killed her husband and kidnapped her only daughter several years ago. However, Rao manages to get a recording of Devi confessing to have freed Rudrayya on purpose despite knowing him to be culpable and gives the recording to the authorities, thereby getting her arrested.

An enraged Rudrayya now sets out on a crusade to rescue Latha who happens to be Yasodhara's daughter from the evil Rao's clutches and get him punished for his crimes. How he accomplishes this forms the rest of the story.

== Cast ==
- Krishna as Rudramaraju "Rudrayya"
- Sridevi as Latha
- Sarada as Yasodhara Devi
- Rao Gopala Rao as Phanibhushan Rao
- Kaikala Satyanarayana as Phanibhushan Rao's elder son
- Gummadi
- Giribabu as Venkatagiri"Giri"
- Allu Ramalingaiah
- Chalapathi Rao as Kotigadu
- Nutan Prasad

== Soundtrack ==
The film had its soundtrack album comprising six tracks scored and composed by K. Chakravarthy with the lyrics penned by Veturi Sundararama Murthy.

1. "Atthadi Atthadi" — P. Susheela, Raj Sitaram
2. "Manjuvaani Intilo" — P. Suseela, Raj Sitaram
3. "Neeku Chakkiliginthalu" — P. Suseela, Raj Sitaram
4. "Pooletti Kottamaaku" — S. Janaki, Raj Sitaram
5. "Raa Guru" — P. Susheela, Raj Sitaram
6. "Srungara Vindhulo" — Raj Sitaram, P. Suseela
