= Akka Chellelu =

1970 film

- Theatrical release poster
- Directed by: Akkineni Sanjeevi
- Written by: Acharya Aatreya (dialogues)
- Screenplay by: Akkineni Sanjeevi
- Story by: Sandow M. M. A. Chinnappa Thevar
- Based on: Akka Thangai (1969)
- Produced by: V. B. Rajendra Prasad
- Starring: Akkineni Nageswara Rao; Sowcar Janaki; Krishna; Vijaya Nirmala
- Cinematography: S. Venkataratnam
- Edited by: T. V. Balu
- Music by: K. V. Mahadevan
- Production company: Jagapathi Art Productions
- Distributed by: Lakshmi Films
- Release date: 1 January 1970
- Running time: 145 minutes
- Country: India
- Language: Telugu

Akka Chellelu (transl. Elder Sister and Younger Sister) is a 1970 Indian Telugu-language drama film, produced by V. B. Rajendra Prasad and directed by A. Sanjeevi. It stars Akkineni Nageswara Rao, Sowcar Janaki, Krishna and Vijaya Nirmala, with music composed by K. V. Mahadevan. The film was a remake of the Tamil film Akka Thangai (1969).

== Plot ==
Ramachandra Rao, however, senses something is wrong and becomes suspicious of Vijaya, but remains nonchalant.

Bhanu's girlfriend Saroja, who is Vijaya's friend, tries to help Vijaya in the case. She goes to Shobha's sister Asha's house, where she sees Ramachandra Rao's face and is shocked. She escapes but he hits her with his car and takes her to her house to kill her. The maid calls Vijaya and Vijaya sees the struggle and takes a photo for evidence, which strengthens her case in court.

Shantamma also reveals that, in order to avoid distress of a lost baby, Dharmaiah brought a different baby from an orphanage and Shantamma raised him, who grew up to be Venu. Papaiah confesses in court that he had Raju commit many crimes to frame Ramachandra Rao and ruin his reputation. He also had Raju kill Shobha because she threatened to expose them.

== Cast ==
- Akkineni Nageswara Rao as Justice Ramachandra Rao and Raju (Dual role)
- Shavukaru Janaki as Janaki
- Krishna as Venu
- Vijaya Nirmala as Vijaya
- Gummadi as Dharmayya
- V. Nagayya as Judge
- Prabhakar Reddy as Lawyer
- Padmanabham as Bhanu
- Rajababu as Pattaiah
- Mada as 'Pocketmaar' Nandi
- Rama Prabha as Saroja
- Santha Kumari as Jayamma
- Suryakantham as Chittamma
- Vijayalalitha as Asha

== Soundtrack ==
Akka Chellelu

Film score by K. V. Mahadevan
- Released: 1970
- Genre: Soundtrack
- Length: 25:08
- Producer: K. V. Mahadevan

K. V. Mahadevan chronology
Marina Manishi (1970)	Akka Chellelu (1970)	Malli Pelli (1970)

Music composed by K. V. Mahadevan. Music released on Audio Company.

S. No	Song title	Lyrics	Singers	length
1	"Chitapata Chinukulato"	Acharya Aatreya	Ghantasala, P. Susheela	4:00
2	"Srimati Emanna Srivaru Tandanatana"	Acharya Aatreya	Ghantasala, P. Susheela	4:09
3	"Pandavulu Pandavulu Tummeda"	Acharya Aatreya	P. Susheela	3:25
4	"Chakachakalade Paduchundi"	Aarudhra	P. Susheela	3:40
5	"Santosham Chesukundam"	Aarudhra	P. Susheela	4:04
6	"O Pilla Phataphataladistaa"	Kosaraju	Ghantasala, P. Susheela	3:15
7	"Idi Matiki Manasuku Poratam Talli"	Acharya Aatreya	Ghantasala	2:35
