= Undamma Bottu Pedata =

1968 film by K. Viswanath

- Poster
- Directed by: K. Viswanath
- Screenplay by: Adurthi Subba Rao; Datta Dharmadhikari
- Story by: Mahadevshastri Joshi
- Dialogue by: S. R. Nandhi
- Produced by: Adurthi Subba Rao
- Starring: Krishna; Jamuna
- Cinematography: K. S. Ramakrishna
- Edited by: Kotagiri Gopala Rao
- Music by: K. V. Mahadevan
- Production company: Babu Movies
- Release date: 28 September 1968
- Running time: 156 minutes
- Country: India
- Language: Telugu

Undamma Bottu Pedata (transl. Wait woman! I will put bindi) is a 1968 Indian Telugu-language supernatural family drama film directed by K. Viswanath and produced by Adurthi Subba Rao. The film stars Krishna and Jamuna in the lead roles, with music composed by K. V. Mahadevan.

Based on the Marathi film Thamb Laxmi Kunku Lavte directed by Datta Dharmadhikari, the screenplay was adapted by Adurthi Subba Rao, who incorporated significant changes to appeal to Telugu audiences.

== Premise ==
The film centers on Dasaratharamayya, a patriarch with four sons, each with distinct flaws. The eldest son, Srinivasulu, is a gambler; the second, Venkateswarlu, is an alcoholic; and the third, Anjaneyulu, is idle. Their wives, Tulasamma, Seshu, and Sumathi, neglect their household responsibilities. The youngest son, Krishna, and his wife Lakshmi, a kind-hearted and devout woman, take care of the family.

In contrast, the fourth son, Krishna, is devoted to his father and married to the kind-hearted Lakshmi. Lakshmi’s devotion to the goddess Lakshmi brings prosperity to their home, but the situation worsens when she goes to her parents' house for delivery. Upon learning that Lakshmi has left, the goddess plans to depart the house. Desperate to keep the goddess of wealth in their home, Lakshmi promises to return with ‘kumkuma’ (vermilion), an auspicious item, on a Friday. She sacrifices herself by jumping into a well to fulfill her vow, causing the goddess to remain in the home, moved by her selfless act.

== Cast ==
Adapted from The Hindu:

- Krishna as Krishna
- Jamuna as Lakshmi
- V. Nagayya as Dasaratharamayya
- Dhulipala as Haridasu
- Nagabhushanam as Srinivasulu
- Chalam as Anjaneyulu
- Sakshi Ranga Rao as the postmaster
- Arja Janardhana Rao as Venkateswarlu
- Sowcar Janaki as Tulasamma
- Anjali Devi as the goddess Lakshmi
- Suryakantham as Papayamma
- Suryakala as Seshu
- Meenakumari as Sumathi

== Production ==
=== Development ===
Adurthi Subba Rao bought the Telugu remake rights of the Marathi film Thamb Laxmi Kunku Lavte (1967). While writing the screenplay of the remake, titled Undamma Bottu Pedata, he retained the essence of the original's story with its climax, but made many other changes such as introducing new characters, mainly to suit the interests of Telugu-speaking audiences. Subba Rao also intended to direct the film and produce it under his banner Babu Movies, but the success of his Hindi directorial venture Milan (1967) led to him receiving more directorial offers from Hindi film producers; after accepting to direct Man Ka Meet (1969) for Sunil Dutt's Ajanta Arts, he entrusted his protégé K. Viswanath with directing Undamma Bottu Pedata. The dialogues were written by N. R. Nandi, cinematography was handled by K. S. Ramakrishna and editing by Kotagiri Gopala Rao.

=== Filming ===
The rural scenes in the film were shot in Manikonda village, located approximately 20 kilometers from Vijayawada, where later scenes for Paadipantalu (1976) were filmed.

In an interview, Krishna revealed that Adurthi Subba Rao, at the request of director K. Viswanath, directed the iconic song sequence "Paathaala Gangamma Ra Ra Ra", which featured Krishna, Jamuna, and other lead actors.

== Soundtrack ==
The soundtrack was composed by K. V. Mahadevan, with lyrics written by Devulapalli Krishnasastri.

Track listing
No.	Title	Singer(s)	Length
1.	"Srisailam Mallanna Sirasonchena Chenantha Gangamma Vaana"	P. Susheela, Ghantasala Venkateswara Rao, Chorus
2.	"Ravamma Mahalakshmi Ravamma"	S. P. Balasubrahmanyam, P. Susheela, Chorus
3.	"Yendhukee Sandhegaali Sandhegaali Theli Murali"	P. Susheela
4.	"Chukkalatho Cheppalani"	S. P. Balasubrahmanyam, P. Susheela
5.	"Adugaduguna Gudi Undhi"	P. Susheela
6.	"Chalule Nidhurapo"	S. P. Balasubrahmanyam, P. Susheela
7.	"Pathala Gangamma Rarara"	P. Susheela, Ghantasala Venkateswara Rao, Chorus

== Release and reception ==
Undamma Bottu Pedata was released on 28 September 1968, successfully completing 62-day run in Vijayawada.
