= Jayam Manade (1986 film) =

1986 Telugu action drama film by K. Bapayya

- Theatrical release poster
- Directed by: K. Bapayya
- Written by: Paruchuri Brothers
- Produced by: T. Venkata Subbaiah
- Starring: Krishna; Sridevi; Rao Gopal Rao
- Cinematography: A. Venkat
- Edited by: K. Venkateswara Rao
- Music by: Chakravarthy
- Production company: TVS Art Productions
- Release date: 10 April 1986
- Country: India
- Language: Telugu

Jayam Manade (transl. Victory is Ours) is a 1986 Indian Telugu-language action drama film written by Paruchuri Brothers and directed by K. Bapayya. A remake of Bengali film, Pratishodh (1981), the film stars Krishna, Sridevi and Rao Gopal Rao, and was released on 10 April 1986.

== Cast ==
- Krishna as Pinnamaneni Bose Babu
- Sridevi as Kanakamahalakshmi
- Rao Gopal Rao as Jodugulla Basavappa
- Prabhakar Reddy as Kondaiah
- Kaikala Satyanarayana as Subbaiah
- Giribabu as Chinnababu
- Nutan Prasad as Varadarajulu
- Allu Ramalingaiah as Doubt Ramaswamy
- P. L. Narayana as Venkatanarayana
- Kanchana as Savithri
- Annapoorna as Rajeshwari
- Ranganath as Ravindra
- Narra Venkateswara Rao as Public Prosecutor
- Chalapathi Rao as Sobhanadri
- Sarathi
- Mada
- Rajyalakshmi as Jyothi
- Eswar Rao as Sekhar
- Dubbing Janaki

== Music ==
The soundtrack album comprising 5 songs was composed by Chakravarthy. Veturi Sundararama Murthy penned the lyrics.

1. "Ya Cheere Kattukonu" — P. Susheela, Madhavapeddi Ramesh
2. "Govulanti Dhanni Ra" — P. Susheela, Madhavapeddi Ramesh
3. "Rani Vasala" — K. J. Yesudas, P. Susheela
4. "Pattu Ollu Pattu" — P. Susheela, Madhavapeddi Ramesh
5. "Okkariki Okaru" — Madhavapeddi Ramesh, P. Susheela

== Sources ==
1. "Jayam Manade"
