= Manchi Kutumbam =

- Theatrical release poster
- Directed by: V. Madhusudhana Rao
- Written by: Acharya Aatreya (dialogues)
- Screenplay by: V. Madhusudhana Rao
- Produced by: P. Mallikarjuna Rao
- Starring: Akkineni Nageswara Rao; Sowcar Janaki; Kanchana; Krishna; Vijaya Nirmala
- Cinematography: P. S. Selvaraj
- Edited by: N. S. Prakasam
- Music by: S. P. Kodandapani
- Production company: Madhu Pictures
- Distributed by: Navayuga Films
- Release date: 15 March 1968
- Running time: 151 minutes
- Country: India
- Language: Telugu

Manchi Kutumbam (transl. Good Family) is a 1968 Indian Telugu-language drama film co-written and directed by V. Madhusudhana Rao. The film stars Akkineni Nageswara Rao, Sowcar Janaki, Kanchana, Krishna and Vijaya Nirmala, with music composed by S. P. Kodandapani. It is a remake of the Hindi film Grahasti (1963) itself based on the American film The Remarkable Mr. Pennypacker (1959). Grahasti was earlier remade into Tamil as Motor Sundaram Pillai (1966).

== Cast ==
- Akkineni Nageswara Rao as Venu Gopal Rao
- Showkar Janaki as Shantha
- Kanchana as Sharada
- Krishna as Mohan
- Vijaya Nirmala as Mala
- Chandra Mohan as Shankar
- Gummadi as Venu Gopal Rao's father-in-law
- Mikkilineni as Principal
- Allu Ramalingaiah as Station Master Bhushanam
- Chalam as Pandu
- Ram Mohan as Gopi
- Thyagaraju as Gopi's father
- Geetanjali as Bala
- Hemalatha as Seetamma
- Pushpa Kumari as Gopi's mother
- Vijayasree as Vimala
- Kanaka Durga as Kamala

== Soundtrack ==
Music was composed by S. P. Kodandapani. The song "Manase Andhala Brundhavanam" is set to the Carnatic raga Hindolam, and is based on "Maname Muruganin" from Motor Sundaram Pillai.

Song title	Lyrics	Singers	length
"Manase Andhala Brundhavanam"	Arudra	P. Susheela	2:35
"Preminchuta Pillala Vantu"	C. Narayana Reddy	Ghantasala, K. J. Yesudas, P. Susheela, S. Janaki	6:51
"Neelo Yemundho"	C. Narayana Reddy	Ghantasala, P. Susheela	3:52
"Yevaruleni Chota"	Arudra	Ghantasala, P. Susheela	4:19
"Thulli Thulli Padutondi"	Arudra	P. Susheela, S. Janaki, Vasantha	3:48
"Tyaga Seelavamma"	C. Narayana Reddy	Ghantasala	2:20
"Nera Nera Nerabandi"	Kosaraju	Pithapuram	2:44
"Ding Dong Ding Dong"	Kosaraju	Geeta Dutt	2:00

== Reception ==
On 17 March 1968, a critic from Visalaandhra gave a positive review, appreciating the way drama was handled in the film. Veeraiah Chowdhary writing for Andhra Prabha on 7 April 1968 appreciated the performances of the lead cast, in addition to the soundtrack.
