= Ram Robert Rahim =

- Poster
- Directed by: Vijaya Nirmala
- Written by: Tripuraneni Maharadhi (Dialogue)
- Screenplay by: Vijaya Nirmala
- Story by: Jeevanprabha M. Desai
- Produced by: Uppalapati Suryanarayana Babu; Krishna (Presenter)
- Starring: Krishna; Rajinikanth; Chandra Mohan; Sridevi
- Cinematography: Pushpala Gopikrishna
- Edited by: Adurthi Haranath
- Music by: K. Chakravarthy
- Production company: Padmavathi Films
- Distributed by: Navayuga Films; Sovereign Combines (Tamil Nadu); Ramakrishna Pictures (Karnataka)
- Release date: 31 May 1980
- Running time: 160 minutes
- Country: India
- Language: Telugu

Ram Robert Rahim is a 1980 Indian Telugu-language masala film directed by Vijaya Nirmala, produced by Uppalapati Suryanarayana Babu and written by Tripuraneni Maharadhi. The film is a remake of the 1977 Hindi film Amar Akbar Anthony. The film stars Krishna, Rajinikanth, Chandra Mohan opposite their female leads of Sridevi, Sunitha and Phataphat Jayalaxmi, with Anjali Devi, Jaggayya and Tyagaraaju in supporting roles. It was released on 31 May 1980. The film was later dubbed and released in Tamil with the same title.

== Plot ==
Jagdish is a driver. He and his wife live a happy life with their three children. He loyally works for his boss, Cunningham. Once Cunningham causes an accident, and begs Jagdish to take the blame on him. He promises to pay monthly expenses to Jagdish's family. Loyal Jagdish goes to jail for his boss. On his release from jail, Jagdish finds his family in deep trouble. His wife is bed-ridden with tuberculosis and poverty is rampant. He goes to Cunningham for help, who not only does not help, but also insults Jagdish. In a fit of rage, Jagdish shoots Cunningham with a pistol and flees in his car.

Jagdish's wife holds a note in her child's hand and sets out to commit suicide. But fate loses sight of her. Jagadish leaves with his three children. He seats them in a park and moves on. The car gets into an accident. The eldest son falls under a jeep and is picked up by a police officer. The second grows up as an adopted son near the Father in a church. The youngest grows up in a Muslim family. This is how Jagdish's family breaks up. Years pass.

Jagdish becomes a millionaire. The elder, Ram, becomes a responsible police officer. The second grows up to be Robert, the third to be Rahim. Jagdish abducts Cunningham's daughter Rosy and sends her to London for further studies. She returns. Robert loves her. Rahim becomes a good Qawwali singer. He falls in love with a girl named Razia. Ram picks up a girl who pickpockets. As a responsible police officer and puts him on a good path to escape from a hellish life. The three meet but their details are not known to themselves.

Cunningham gets rich again. Cunningham longs to meet his daughter Roji, who was kidnapped by Jagdish as a child. Looks everywhere. Circumstances at the time Rosie finds him make it difficult for Rosie to marry her partner, James.

Robert remembers his father, Jagadish, when his father was killed. Jagdish remembers his wife Rahim, his son, living a life of flowers. Cunningham and his gang hand over Ram, Robert and Rahim in disguise to the police during Rosie's wedding. Jagdish is punished for his mistake and reunites with his wife and children.

== Cast ==
- Krishna as Robert, Liquor store owner. Middle son of Jagadish and Bharathi, Raghava.
- Rajinikanth as Ram, Inspector. Eldest son of Jagadish and Bharathi, Shiva "Ram".
- Chandra Mohan as Rahim Lakhnavi, Qawwali Singer. Youngest son of Jagadish and Bharathi, Raja.
- Sridevi as Rosy, Robert's love interest
- Sunitha as Lakshmi, Ram's love interest
- Phataphat Jayalaxmi as Dr. Razia Mia, Rahim's wife
- Anjali Devi as Bharathi, wife of Jagadish and biological mother of Ram, Robert and Rahim
- Jaggayya as Jagadish Babu, husband of Bharathi and biological father of Ram, Robert and Rahim
- Tyagaraaju as Cunningham, biological father of Rosy
- Allu Ramalingaiah as Jinghu Mia, Razia's father
- Kanta Rao as Church Father (Catholic Priest), Robert's adoptive father
- Mikkilineni as DSP
- P. J. Sarma as Lakhnavi, Rahim's adoptive father
- Jaya Vijaya as Lakshmi's Stepmother
- Pandari Bai as Lakshmi's Grand Mother
- Prasad Babu as Ganga Ram, Lakshmi's Step-brother
- Yusuf Khan as James, Rosy's bodyguard

== Soundtrack ==
Track listing
No.	Title	Lyrics	Singer(s)	Length
1.	"Ammante Amma"
2.	"Chilakundhi Chilaka"		S. P. Balasubrahmanyam	6:06
3.	"Laka Laka"
4.	"Mugguru Kalisi"
5.	"My Name Is"
6.	"Oka Ammaayi"		S. P. Balasubrahmanyam, S.P. Sailaja, P.Susheela, G.Anand
7.	"Okkasaari Muddhu Pettuko"
8.	"Saayi Baba"	Veturi	S. P. Balasubrahmanyam
