= Stree Janma =

- Theatrical release poster
- Directed by: K. S. Prakash Rao
- Written by: Samudrala Jr (dialogues)
- Screenplay by: K. S. Prakash Rao
- Story by: K. S. Prakash Rao
- Produced by: D. Ramanaidu
- Starring: N. T. Rama Rao; Krishna Kumari
- Cinematography: C. Nageswara Rao
- Edited by: Marthand
- Music by: Ghantasala
- Production company: Suresh Productions
- Release date: 31 August 1967
- Country: India
- Language: Telugu

Stree Janma (transl. Women's Life) is a 1967 Telugu-language drama film, produced by D. Ramanaidu under the Suresh Productions banner and directed by K. S. Prakash Rao. It stars N. T. Rama Rao and Krishna Kumari, with music composed by Ghantasala.

== Plot ==
The film begins with AR College founder Susheela Devi, who has two siblings, Shekar and Kishore. Kalyani is a star pupil of the college and earns Susheela's good opinion. Kalyani goes to her friend's wedding. Shekar is also there. Shekar is infatuated with a dancer named Nalini and in a drunken state, he rapes Kalyani mistaking her for Nalini. Later, Shekar repents and admits his guilt to Nalini who is baffled by it but accepts the apology thinking nothing of it. Meanwhile, Kalyani becomes pregnant which leads to her father, Parandhamaiah's death. Before his death, Kalyani's brother Anand assures him that he will make sure Kalyani's life does not get tarnished because of this incident. Time passes, and Kalyani delivers a baby boy whom Anand takes away and abandons. Susheela finds him and takes him with her. Susheela then plans to get Kalyani married to Shekar. Anand compels Kalyani to hide her past and agree to the marriage. After the wedding, Kalyani sees the baby and finds out it is her lost son. Kalyani cannot get close to Shekar due to her guilt which makes Shekhar unhappy. Meanwhile, Kishore falls for Vijaya, the daughter of the principal Parabrahmam. Being cognizant of it, lecturer Madhu Murthy, Shekhar's friend, forewarns him. An irate Parabrahmam implies to Shekhar that there is an illicit relationship between to Murthy and Susheela Devi. Believing it, Shekar proclaims his sister a slut which makes her attempt suicide. Seeing the situation, Kalyani confesses that the baby is actually hers which infuriated Shekar and he tries to kill her in a rage. Just then, Nalini comes forward and clears the misunderstanding having finally understood what Shekhar was apologizing for previously. The movie ends with Susheela breathing her last while uniting Shekar and Kalyani.

== Cast ==
- N. T. Rama Rao as Shekar
- Krishna Kumari as Kalyani
- Krishna as Kishore
- Kanta Rao as Madhu Murthy
- V. Nagayya as Parandhamaiah
- Prabhakar Reddy as Anand
- Padmanabham as Sridhar
- Raja Babu as Chichu
- Raavi Kondala Rao as Principal Parabrahmam
- K.V.Chalam
- Anjali Devi as Susheela Devi
- Rajasree as Nalini
- Vanisri as Phani
- L. Vijayalakshmi as Vijji
- Geetanjali as Subbulu
- Rama Prabha as Chachu

== Soundtrack ==
Stree Janma

Film score by Ghantasala
- Released: 1967
- Genre: Soundtrack
- Producer: Ghantasala

Ghantasala chronology
Bhuvana Sundari Katha (1967)	Stree Janma (1967)	Punyavathi (1967)

Music composed by Ghantasala.

S. No.	Song title	Lyrics	Singers	length
1	"Yedo Yedo Avuthondi"	C. Narayana Reddy	P. Susheela	
2	"Yedaarilo Poolu"	Acharya Aatreya	Ghantasala	
3	"Vedale Simhabaludu"	Kosaraju	Madhavapeddi Satyam, Swarnalatha	
4	"Hello Annadhi Manasu"	Aarudhra	Ghantasala, P. Susheela	3:19
5	"Basandi Naditeeram"	Samudrala Jr.	Pithapuram, L. R. Eswari	2:57
6	"Cheyani Nomai"	Acharya Aatreya	P. Susheela	3:10
7	"Eenati Kurrakaru"	Samudrala Jr.	Ghantasala, P. Susheela	
8	"Yedaarilo Poolu"	Dasaradhi	Ghantasala, P. Susheela	3:58
9	"Thalli Ede Taratarala Katha"	Acharya Aatreya	Ghantasala	2:14
