= Brahmastram (1986 film) =

1986 film directed by G. Ram Mohana Rao

- Theatrical release poster
- Directed by: G. Ram Mohana Rao
- Written by: Satyanand (dialogues)
- Screenplay by: G. Ram Mohana Rao
- Story by: Vietnam Veedu Sundaram
- Produced by: D. Kaasi Viswanatha Rao
- Starring: Krishna; Vijayashanti; Rajendra Prasad
- Cinematography: V. S. R. Swamy
- Edited by: Kotagiri Gopala Rao
- Music by: Chakravarthy
- Production company: Sri Dhairya Lakshmi Pictures
- Release date: 14 February 1986
- Country: India
- Language: Telugu

Brahmastram (transl. The Ultimate Weapon) is a 1986 Indian Telugu-language action film, produced by D. Kaasi Viswanatha Rao under the Sri Dhairya Lakshmi Pictures banner and directed by G. Ram Mohana Rao. It stars Krishna, Vijayashanti, and Rajendra Prasad with music composed by Chakravarthy. Few sequences of the movie were based on the 1984 Kannada film Chanakya starring Vishnuvardhan and Madhavi in the lead roles.

== Cast ==
- Krishna as Barrister Vidya Sagar
- Vijayashanti as Jaya
- Rajendra Prasad as Raja
- Rao Gopala Rao as Gopanna
- Kannada Prabhakar as Nagaraju
- Jaggayya as Advocate Parthasarathi
- Nutan Prasad as Prasad
- Ramakrishna as Inspector Jagannath
- Kanta Rao as Doctor
- Padmanabham as Head Constable
- C. S. Rao as Judge
- Suthi Velu as Thief
- Sakshi Ranga Rao as Lingaraju
- Saikumar as Govind
- Srilakshmi as Sundari
- Varalakshmi as Jyothi
- Shubha as Jagannath's wife
- Samyuktha as Lakshmi
- Sunvarna as Anuradha

== Crew ==
- Art: Thota Hemasundar
- Choreography: Saleem
- Fights: Judo Ratnam
- Dialogues: Satyanand
- Lyrics: Veturi
- Playback: Raj Seetharam, P. Susheela
- Story: Viatnam Veedu Sundaram
- Music: Chakravarthy
- Editing: Kotagiri Gopala Rao
- Cinematography: V. S. R. Swamy
- Producer: D. Kasi Viswanatha Rao
- Director: G. Rama Mohana Rao
- Banner: Sri Dhairya Lakshmi Pictures
- Release Date: 14 February 1986

== Soundtrack ==
Brahmastram

Film score by Chakravarthy
- Released: 1986
- Genre: Soundtrack
- Length: 19:04
- Label: LEO Audio
- Producer: Chakravarthy

Chakravarthy chronology
Krishna Garadi (1986)	Brahmastram (1986)	Jayam Manade (1986)

Music composed by Chakravarthy. Lyrics were written by Veturi. Music released on LEO Audio Company.

S. No.	Song title	Singers	length
1	"Ammamma"	Raj Seetaram, P. Susheela	4:01
2	"Vaatesukunnaka"	Raj Seetaram, P. Susheela	4:16
3	"Mudda Mudda Mandaram"	Raj Seetaram, P. Susheela	3:35
4	"Uggu Palathonaina"	P. Susheela	3:21
5	"Aa Devudu"	Raj Seetaram	3:51
