= Nivuru Gappina Nippu =

1982 Telugu film by K. Bapayya

- Directed by: K. Bapayya
- Written by: Bhamidipati Radhakrishna
- Produced by: A. L. Kumar
- Starring: Krishna; Sivaji Ganesan; Jaya Prada; M. Prabhakar Reddy; Allu Ramalingaiah
- Edited by: Kotagiri Venkateswara Rao
- Music by: Chakravarty
- Production company: Viswaprashanth Movies
- Release date: 24 June 1982
- Country: India
- Language: Telugu

Nivuru Gappina Nippu (transl. The Embers) (Note: The title is a metaphor for either a person with some hidden talent or strengths inhibited by something or for seemingly dormant ire ready to burst out.) is a 1982 Indian Telugu-language action drama film directed by K. Bapayya, produced by A. L. Kumar, written by Bhamidipati Radhakrishna, starring Krishna, Sivaji Ganesan, Jaya Prada, M. Prabhakar Reddy and Allu Ramalingaiah. Chakravarty composed the film's music.

== Plot ==
A dynamic man named Gopi (Krishna) navigates deep familial conflicts, societal challenges, and face-offs against wrongdoers.

== Cast ==
- Krishna as Gopi
- Sivaji Ganesan
- Jaya Prada as Rekha
- M. Prabhakar Reddy
- Allu Ramalingaiah
- Giri Babu as Ravi
- Nagesh
- Peketi Sivaram
- Girija
- Narra Venkateswara Rao
- P. J. Sarma as DSP

== Music ==
Chakravarty scored and composed the film's soundtrack.

Title	Singer(s)
"Adigo Puli"	S.P.B., P. Susheela
"Amma Chaatu Pillane"	P. Susheela
"Chakkani Matta Chepu"	S.P.B., P. Susheela
"Gajja Katta Galava"	S.P.B., P. Susheela
"Siggu Poye Eggu Poye"	S.P.B., P. Susheela
"Vachadamma Pelli"	S.P.B., P. Susheela

== Release and Reception ==
Nivuru Gappina Nippu was released on 24 June 1982.
