= Sri Sri (film) =

- Poster
- Directed by: Muppalaneni Siva
- Written by: Kankipati Ram
- Produced by: Sri Sai Deep Chatla; Balu Reddy
- Starring: Krishna; Vijaya Nirmala; Angana Roy; Naresh; Kunal Kaushik; Murali Sharma; Sai Kumar; Posani Krishna Murali
- Narrated by: Mahesh Babu
- Music by: E. S. Murthy
- Production company: SBS Productions
- Release date: 3 June 2016
- Running time: 139 minutes
- Country: India
- Language: Telugu

Sri Sri is a 2016 Indian Telugu-language drama film written and directed by Muppalaneni Shiva. The film stars Krishna, Vijaya Nirmala, Angana Roy, Kunal Kaushik, Naresh, Murali Sharma and Sai Kumar. It was final film of both Vijaya Nirmala and Krishna before their deaths in 2019 and 2022, respectively.

== Plot ==
The film revolves round retired law professor Sripada Srinivasa Rao (Krishna) and his family. The sole source of their happiness, their only daughter is killed by powerful and merciless people. How Sri Sri takes revenge on the killers of his daughter forms the crux of the story.

== Cast ==
- Krishna as Sripada Srinivasa Rao/Sri Sri
- Vijaya Nirmala as Sumathi
- Angana Roy as Swetha
- Kunal Kaushik as Aadi
- Murali Sharma as J. K. Bharadwaj
- Naresh
- Posani Krishna Murali
- Sai Kumar
- Ravi Prakash
- Madhu Thotapalli
- L. B. Sriram
- Ashish Gandhi as Rahul
- Mahesh Babu (voiceover)
- Sudheer Babu (cameo appearance)
