= Sardar Krishnama Naidu =

1987 Telugu action drama film by Kodandarami Reddy

- Directed by: A. Kodandarami Reddy
- Screenplay by: A. Kodandarami Reddy
- Produced by: B. H. Ajay Kumar
- Starring: Krishna; Vijayashanti; Sarada
- Music by: Chakravarthy
- Production company: Bala Balaji Productions
- Release date: 11 June 1987
- Country: India
- Language: Telugu

Sardar Krishnama Naidu (transl. Chieftain Krishnama Naidu) is a 1987 Indian Telugu-language action drama film written and directed by A. Kodandarami Reddy starring Krishna in dual roles alongside Sarada and Vijayashanti, produced by B. H. Ajay Kumar for Bala Balaji Productions with a musical score by Chakravarthy. Released on 11 June, the film marked the last collaboration of Krishna with Reddy.

== Cast ==
- Krishna as Sardar Krishnama Naidu and Venu
- Vijayashanti as Sandhya
- Sarada as Dr. Vasundhara Devi
- Rao Gopala Rao as Sasibhushan Rao
- Ranganath as Chandrasekharam
- Kaikala Satyanarayana as Jogeswara Rao
- Ravi Kondala Rao as Judge
- Chalapati Rao as Parasuram
- Annapurna as Santha
- M. V. S. Haranatha Rao as Kaleshwara Rao
- Paruchuri Gopal Krishna as Netaji
- Rallapalli as Rangachari
- Sumithra as Vasantha
- Divyavani as Padma
- Raja as Raja
- Potti Prasad as Judge's assistant

== Soundtrack ==
Chakravarthy scored and composed the film's soundtrack.

Sl. No.	Title	Lyricist	Singer(s)
1.	"Eppudeppudani Enta"	Veturi Sundararama Murthy	
2.	"Hamsabale Andalu"	Veturi Sundararama Murthy	
3.	"Gulabi Bala"	Veturi Sundararama Murthy	
4.	"Ee Daivam Ee"	Veturi Sundararama Murthy	
5.	"Jabakku Jabakku"	Veturi Sundararama Murthy	
