= Simhasanam (1986 film) =

1986 Telugu film by Krishna

- Poster
- Directed by: Krishna
- Screenplay by: Krishna
- Story by: Krishna
- Dialogue by: Tripuraneni Maharadhi
- Produced by: Krishna
- Starring: Krishna; Jayaprada; Radha; Mandakini
- Cinematography: V. S. R. Swamy
- Edited by: Krishna
- Music by: Bappi Lahiri
- Production company: Padmalaya Studios
- Release date: 21 March 1986
- Country: India
- Language: Telugu
- Budget: ₹3.2–4 crore

Simhasanam (transl. The throne) is a 1986 Indian Telugu-language epic period action film written, directed, edited, and produced by Krishna under the Padmalaya Studios banner. Marking his directorial debut, Krishna also stars in a dual role, alongside Jayaprada, Radha, and Mandakini. The supporting cast includes Waheeda Rehman, Satyanarayana, Kantha Rao, Prabhakar Reddy, Gummadi, Giri Babu, and Amjad Khan. The music for the film was composed by Bappi Lahiri, marking his Telugu debut. The film was simultaneously shot in Hindi as Singhasan, with Jeetendra as the lead.

Blending historical and folk narratives, Simhasanam draws inspiration from figures such as Rudrama Devi and Gona Ganna Reddy. Set in the fictional kingdoms of Dasarna and Avanthi, the film follows Vikrama Simha, the wrongfully exiled army commander of Dasarna, and his look-alike, Prince Aditya Vardhana of Avanthi, as they navigate a power struggle for the thrones of both kingdoms.

The film's production featured a significantly higher budget for its time, ranging from ₹3.2 to ₹4 crore. It was the first Telugu film to be released in 70 mm, 6-track stereophonic sound. Released on 21 March 1986, the film was distributed across 85 prints in 153 theatres throughout South India. Simhasanam was a commercial success, running for 100 days in more than 30 centers with regular shows and in six 70mm centres, and was praised for its grand scale. The film marked a milestone in Krishna's career, showcasing his versatility as both an actor and director.

== Plot ==
Vikrama Simha, the Senapathi (army chief) of the Dasarna kingdom, defeats several feudal lords and secures their allegiance to King Kshemendra Bhupathi. In recognition of his accomplishments, the king grants Vikrama Simha the titles of the kingdom and gifts him the Bhavani sword, a revered heirloom.

Princess Alakananda, the king’s daughter, secretly loves Vikrama Simha. Meanwhile, Bherunda, the kingdom's Maha Mantri (prime minister), plots to kill Alakananda and claim the throne. Vikrama Simha foils the attempt, but Bherunda accuses him of treason. Despite these accusations, the king, acknowledging Vikrama Simha's past services, commutes his sentence from death to exile. Vikrama accepts the decision and advises the king to strengthen the security around the princess.

The story shifts to the temple of Goddess Aparajitha, where Dasarna and Avanthi kingdoms alternate in performing the first prayer. This year, Alakananda performs the ritual. The queen mother of Avanthi expresses interest in marrying her son, Prince Aditya Vardhana, to Alakananda, uniting the kingdoms.

In Avanthi, Prince Aditya Vardhana, who bears a striking resemblance to Vikrama Simha, leads a carefree life. He becomes infatuated with Jaswanthi, a court dancer, but is reprimanded by the queen for his irresponsible behaviour. The queen attempts to reform Aditya, and he matures into a more responsible prince. She wishes for him to marry Alakananda Devi. However, during a hunting expedition, Aditya encounters Chandana, a beautiful woman revealed to be a vishakanya. Aditya falls in love with her, but when Chandana realizes her nature, she attempts to end her life. Vikrama Simha intervenes, rescues her, and helps her reform.

Amid these developments, Aditya Vardhana requests Vikrama Simha to temporarily rule Avanthi and resolve the kingdom’s crises. Vikrama agrees, later restoring the throne to Aditya, who marries Chandana. Meanwhile, Avanthi’s Rajaguru (royal guru) conspires to place his son on the throne, but his plan is thwarted by Vikrama Simha. In the end, Vikrama foils Bherunda's plans in Dasarna, ensuring peace in both kingdoms. The story concludes with Vikrama Simha marrying Alakananda Devi.

== Cast ==
- Krishna as Vikrama Simha and Aditya Vardhana
- Jaya Prada as Princess Alakananda Devi
- Radha as Jaswanthi
- Mandakini as Chandanagandhi "Chandana"
- Waheeda Rehman as Queen Mother of Avanthi (voice dubbed by Sowcar Janaki)
- Kaikala Satyanarayana as Rajaguru of Avanthi
- Prabhakar Reddy as Bherunda, Maha Mantri (Prime Minister) of Dasarna
- Gummadi as Srikantayya, Maha Mantri (Prime Minister) of Avanthi
- M. Balayya as an Army General of Dasarna
- Kantha Rao as Kshemendra Bhupathi, Maharaja of Dasarna
- Giri Babu as Ugra Rahu, Army Chief of Avanthi
- Allu Ramalingaiah
- Amjad Khan (voice dubbed by Nutan Prasad) as Kukuteswar
- Praveen Kumar as Kaala Bhairava
- Gurbachan Singh as Katari Kataya
- Jayamalini as Dancer
- Anuradha as Dancer
- Jayasree T as Dancer
- Leena Das as Dancer

== Production ==
=== Development ===
In November 1984, actor Superstar Krishna launched his film studio, Padmalaya, aiming to establish it as a significant name in the industry. At the time, he was balancing his acting career in Telugu films with producing Hindi films. To enhance the studio’s reputation, Krishna decided to remake the 1951 Telugu film Pathala Bhairavi into Hindi. The remake, titled Pataal Bhairavi, was released in May 1985 and became a success, giving Krishna the momentum to pursue a more ambitious project.

In 1985, Krishna ventured into direction and set out to create a grand folklore (janapada) film with impressive sets. To make this high-budget venture work, he decided to produce it in both Telugu and Hindi. This led to Simhasanam, the first Telugu film shot in 70 mm. The Telugu version was titled Simhasanam, while the Hindi version was titled Singhasan, starring Jeetendra. Produced under the Padmalaya banner with his brothers G. Hanumantha Rao and G. Adiseshagiri Rao managing the project, Krishna made his directorial debut, also taking on roles as screenwriter, editor, and producer.

Krishna is officially credited with the story and screenplay, while his frequent collaborator, Tripuraneni Maharadhi, is credited with the dialogues. However, Maharadhi played a significant role in writing the entire script, not just the dialogue portion. The film blends historical elements with folk narratives, drawing inspiration from actual events and figures. The characters of Queen Alakananda Devi and army commander Vikrama Simha were based on the historical figures Rudrama Devi and Gona Ganna Reddy, who assisted Rudrama Devi during times of crisis in the Kakatiya Empire. Additionally, the character of Chandanagandhi was inspired by a historical incident involving a Vishakanya, who was used against Chandragupta Maurya, the Mauryan Emperor.

=== Casting ===
Krishna played dual roles as Vikrama Simha and Aditya Vardhana. Jayapradha was cast as Princess Alakananda Devi, with Radha, and Mandakini in key female roles. Other prominent actors included Waheeda Rehman, Prabhakar Reddy, Satyanarayana, Kantha Rao, Gummadi, and Giri Babu.

Amjad Khan made his Telugu debut with a significant role in both the Telugu and Hindi versions. Nutan Prasad provided the voice for Amjad Khan, and Sowcar Janaki dubbed for Waheeda Rehman in the Telugu version. Dialogue writer Tripuraneni Maharathi also appeared in a role in the film.

The technical team included Bhaskar Raju as the art director and costume designer, C. Madhav Rao for makeup, and Veeru Devgan for action choreography.

=== Filming ===
Principal photography took place at Padmalaya Studios in Hyderabad, with additional filming in locations such as Hogenakkal and Mysore. The film was shot simultaneously in Telugu and Hindi, with Jeetendra starring in the Hindi version, Singhasan. In a unique production approach, a shot was first filmed in Telugu, and the same setup was later used for the Hindi version. Both versions of the film were completed in 65 days. With a budget ranging from ₹3.2 to 4 crore, Simhasanam was made at a significantly higher cost compared to typical films of the time, where budgets generally ranged between ₹40 and ₹50 lakh.

The cinematography was handled by V. S. R. Swamy, a long-time collaborator of Krishna. Ravikant Nagaich, a mentor to Swamy in camera work, was responsible for the film's special effects . Teja, who worked as an assistant to Nagaich, recalled that for the song "Aakasamlo Oka Tara," trick shots were used to depict a palace in Brindavan Gardens.

Art director Bhaskar Raju designed large-scale sets, including the iconic royal darbar set and grand statues, which became significant elements of the film and were displayed in the studio for an extended period. Prior to the establishment of Ramoji Film City, co-producer Hanumantha Rao is reported to have explained the process of creating these statues to its proprietor, Ramoji Rao.

== Music ==
The film's music was composed by Bappi Lahiri, marking his debut in Telugu cinema. The lyrics were written by Aatreya and Veturi. Tracks such as "Aakasamlo Oka Tara" and "Vahava Nee Yavvanam" became popular and continue to be enjoyed.

At the time, a controversy arose between Krishna and singer S. P. Balasubrahmanyam. Impressed by the voice of Raj Sitaram, a degree student from Tamil Nadu, Krishna chose him to sing all the songs for Surya Chandra (1985). Bappi Lahiri also approved of Sitaram's voice for Simhasanam's songs. As a result, Raj Sitaram sang all the songs in the film.

No.	Title	Singer(s)	Length
1.	"Akashamlo Oka Tara"	Raj Sitaram, P. Susheela
2.	"Gumma Gumma"	Raj Sitaram, P. Susheela
3.	"Idhi Kalayani Nenanukona"	Raj Sitaram, P. Susheela
4.	"Swagatham"	Raj Sitaram, P. Susheela
5.	"Vahavaee Yavvanam"	Raj Sitaram, P. Susheela
6.	"Vayyaramantha"	Raj Sitaram, P. Susheela

== Release ==
Simhasanam was censored on 18 February 1986, and released on 21 March 1986, with 85 prints distributed across 153 theaters in South India. It was the first Telugu film to be released in 70 mm format. The film attracted large crowds upon release, causing significant traffic jams near theaters and generating considerable buzz at the time.

== Reception ==
Simhasanam was a commercial success, running for 50 days in 38 centres and 100 days in more than 30 centers with regular shows and in six 70mm centres. It set a record as the first Telugu film to gross over ₹1.5 crore in its opening week. Total gross of Telugu version is estimated at close to 7 crores.

The film's 100-day celebration in VGP Gardens, Madras, drew a large crowd of Krishna's fans, creating significant excitement and attracting attention from the Tamil Nadu government. Approximately 400 buses transported fans from Andhra to Madras for the event.
