= Vijaya Nirmala =

Indian film actress (1946–2019)

- Born: Nidudavolu Nirmala; 20 February 1946; Narasaraopet, Madras Presidency, British India
- Died: 27 June 2019 (aged 73); Hyderabad, Telangana, India
- Spouses: K. S. Murthy (died); Krishna
- Children: Naresh (son)
- Family: See Nidudavolu Family; Ghattamaneni Family

Vijaya Nirmala (born Nidudavolu Nirmala; 20 February 1946 – 27 June 2019) was an Indian actress, director, and producer known for her works predominantly in Telugu cinema along with a few Malayalam and Tamil films. In a career spanning over six decades, she acted in more than 200 films and directed 44 films. In 2002, she entered the Guinness Book of World Records as the female director who has directed the most number of films in the world. In 2008, she received the Raghupathi Venkaiah Award for lifetime achievement in Telugu cinema.

Born as Nirmala, she ventured into acting as a child artist with films like Macha Rekai (1950) and Panduranga Mahatyam (1957). She debuted as a lead actress in the 1964 Malayalam film Bhargavi Nilayam which became one of the biggest hits of that year. She then acted in the Tamil film Enga Veettu Penn (1965) produced by Vijaya Productions. She added Vijaya to her name as a mark of gratitude to the production house that gave her a break as an artiste. She debuted as a leading lady in Telugu with Rangula Ratnam (1966).

She made her directorial debut in Telugu with Meena (1973) and went on to direct over 44 films. She acted with her husband Krishna in over 40 films from Sakshi (1967) to Sri Sri (2016) and the duo was considered as a hit pair. She launched her own production house – Vijaya Krishna Movies and went on to produce 15 films under the banner. She also handled the operations of Padmalaya Studios and Padmalaya Tele Films. Her son Naresh is also a noted actor in Telugu cinema.

== Early life ==
She was born as Nidudavolu Nirmala on 20 February 1946 into a Telugu Brahmin family settled in Tamil Nadu who were originally from Narasaraopet. Her father was a film producer. Her paternal grand uncle was scholar and literary historian Nidudavolu Venkatarao. Actress Jayasudha is Venkatrao's granddaughter while singer R. Balasaraswathi Devi is her paternal aunt's daughter.

== Personal life ==
Vijaya Nirmala was married to Krishna Murthy and had a son Naresh, who is also an actor. After Murthy died, she married actor Krishna.

== Career ==
Vijaya Nirmala entered cinema as a child artist with the Tamil movie Macha Rekai (1950). At age eleven, she debuted in Telugu films with Panduranga Mahatmyam (1957). In 1964, she starred opposite Prem Nazir and rose to stardom with the Malayalam film Bhargavi Nilayam. Also, in 1967, she starred again opposite Prem Nazir in Udhyogastha, by P. Venu. She debuted in the Telugu industry in the film Rangula Ratnam (1966).

Her first film in Tamil was Enga Veettu Penn (1965), which was followed by Panama Pasama (1968), Uyira Maanama (1968), En Annan (1970), and Gnana Oli (1972). She met her second husband Krishna on the sets of Sakshi (1967), her second film in Telugu, and they starred together in 47 films. It was Sakshi that kindled her interest in direction. She has acted in over 200 films with 25 each in Malayalam and Tamil, and the remaining in Telugu.

Her small screen debut came with Balaji Telefilms' Pelli Kanuka. Soon after, she launched her own banner Vijaya Krishna Movies and produced 15 films. She added Vijaya to her name as a gratitude to the production house. She made her directorial debut with a Malayalam film on a budget of 3 lakhs. She made her directorial debut in Telugu with Meena and directed 40 films in Telugu and one film each in Malayalam (directorial debut film) and Tamil (Kungumachimizh). The actress-director was based in Hyderabad and managed Padmalaya Studios and Padmalaya Telefilms Ltd.

== Selected filmography ==
=== Telugu ===
Year	Film	Role	Notes
1957	Panduranga Mahatyam	Bala Krishnudu	
1958	Bhookailas	Goddess Seetha	
1966	Rangula Ratnam		
1967	Poola Rangadu	Padma	
1967	Sakshi		
1968	Manchi Kutumbam		
1968	Asadhyudu	Radha	
1968	Bangaru Gaajulu	Radha	
1969	Aatmiyulu	Saroja	
1969	Muhurtha Balam	Kamala	
1969	Takkari Donga Chakkani Chukka	Geeta	
1970	Akka Chellelu	Lawyer Vijaya	
1970	Vidhi Vilasam	Nirmala	
1970	Thaali Bottu	Nirmala	
1971	Bomma Borusa		
1971	Anuradha	Anuradha	
1971	Mosagallaku Mosagadu	Radha	
1972	Tata Manavadu	Rani	
1972	Kathula Rathaiah		
1972	Bhale Mosagadu	Rani, Agent 117	
1972	Pandanti Kapuram		
1973	Devudu Chesina Manushulu		
1973	Sahasame Naa Oopiri		
1973	Pinni		
1973	Buddhimantudu		
1973	Patnavasam		
1973	Manchi Vallaki Manchivadu	Saakhi	
1973	Marina Manishi		
1973	Meena	Meena	
1974	Alluri Seetarama Raju	Seeta	
1974	Devadasu	Parvathy	
1974	Dhanavanthulu Gunavanthulu	Padma	
1974	Bantrotu Bharya		
1975	Mallela Manasulu	Radha Devi	
1976	Padi Pantalu	Radha	
1977	Kurukshetram	Subhadra	
1978	Patnavasam	Geetha	
1979	Moodu Puvvulu Aaru Kayalu	Gowri, Uma Devi	Dual Role
1979	Hema Hemeelu	Vijaya	
1987	Trimurtulu		Cameo
1988	Collector Vijaya		
1989	Atha Mechina Alludu	Parvathi	
1989	Pinni		
1989	Sahasame Naa Oopiri	Lakshmi	
1989	Gandipeta Rahasyam		
1990	Prajala Manishi	Jhansi	
2005	Sravanamasam		
2009	Neramu Siksha	Archana	
2016	Sri Sri	Sumathi	

=== Malayalam ===
Year	Film	Role
1964	Bhargavi Nilayam	Bhargavi
1965	Rosie	Leena
1965	Kalyanarathriyil	Karthika
1966	Poochakkanni	Maheshwari
1973	Pooja	Radha
1973	Udhyogastha	Sujatha
1973	Anweshichu Kandethiyilla	Radhika
1968	Karutha Pournami	Janamma
1974	Nishagandhi	Padmini
1974	Vivaham Swargathil	Lisy
1976	Aana Valarthiya Vanampadiyude Makan	Omana
1973	Kalippava	Rani
1973	Pulliman	Devika
1973	Postmane Kananilla	Nalini
1973	Thenaruvi	Sudha
1973	Kattuvithachavan	Lakshmi
1973	Ponnapuram Kotta	Kanni
1973	Kavitha	Kavitha
1974	Durga	Thulasi
1978	Kenalum Collectorum	Indhulekha

=== Tamil ===
Year	Film	Role
1950	Macha Rekai	Young Mahalingam
1965	Enga Veetu Penn	
1966	Chitthi	Saroja
1967	Pandhayam	
1968	Neelagiri Express	Geetha
1968	Panama Pasama	Kannamma aka Baby
1968	Siritha Mugam	
1968	Sathiyam Thavaradhey	
1968	Soaappu Seeppu Kannadi	Latha
1968	Uyira Manama	
1969	Anbalippu	Meena
1970	En Annan	Thangam
1971	Yanai Valartha Vanampadi Magan	
1972	Gnana Oli	
1974	Puthiya Manithan	
1984	Sumangali Kolam	

=== Director ===
Year	Film	Notes
1973	Kavitha	Malayalam
1973	Meena	Based on the novel Meena by Yaddanapudi Sulochana Rani which was later adapted into 2016 movie A Aa
1974	Devadasu	
1976	Devude Gelichadu	Remake of Malayalam film Yakshagaanam
1976	Kavitha	
1977	Panchayathi	
1978	Rowdy Rangamma	
1979	Moodu Puvvulu Aaru Kayalu	
1979	Sanku Theertham	
1979	Hema Hemeelu	
1980	Ram Robert Rahim	Remake of Hindi film Amar Akbar Anthony
1980	Kiladi Krishnudu	
1980	Sangham Chekkina Silpalu	
1980	Sirimalle Navvindi	
1981	Bhogi Mantalu	
1981	Antham Kadidi Aarambam	Remake of Kannada film Antha
1982	Doctor Cine Actor	
1983	Bezawada Bebbuli	
1984	Mukhyamantri	Remake of Kannada film Chakravyuha
1984	Mukkopi	
1985	Lanke Bindelu	
1985	Surya Chandra	
1988	Collector Vijaya	
1989	Sahasame Naa Oopiri	
1989	Ajatha Satruvu	
1990	Prajala Manishi	
1991	Vadina Maata	
1992	Mogudu Pellala Dongaata	
1994	Yes Nenante Nene	
1996	Puttinti Gowravam	
1996	Rendu Kutumbala Katha	
2009	Neramu Siksha	

== See also ==
- Raghupathi Venkaiah Award
