= Padmalaya Studios =

Indian film production and distribution company

- Type: Private
- Industry: Entertainment
- Founded: 1970 (Padmalaya Movies); 1984 (Padmalaya Studios)
- Founder: Ghattamaneni Krishna
- Successors: Indira Productions; G. Mahesh Babu Entertainment; Krishna Productions
- Headquarters: Jubilee Hills, Hyderabad, India
- Key people: G. Krishna; G. Adiseshagiri Rao; G. Hanumantha Rao
- Products: Films
- Services: Film production Film distribution
- Subsidiaries: Sri Padmalaya Movies; Padmalaya Pictures; Padmalaya Combines; Padmalaya Films; Ratna Movies; Padmalaya Creatives; Padmalaya Telefilms Ltd; Padmalaya Arts

Padmalaya Studios is an Indian film production company and studio facility established by actor Krishna and his brothers. Based in Hyderabad, it primarily focuses on the production and distribution of Telugu and Hindi films. The studio's operations are now managed through its successors, including Indira Productions, G. Mahesh Babu Entertainment, and Krishna Productions.

The production company, initially known as Padmalaya Movies, was founded in 1970 with its first film Agni Pariksha. In 1982, the Andhra Pradesh state government allocated 9.5 acres of land to Krishna to promote the development of the film industry in Hyderabad. This led to the establishment of the Padmalaya Studios, a film studio facility, which officially opened in November 1984. The first film shot at the studio was Simhasanam (1986).

== History ==
=== Padmalaya Movies ===
Padmalaya Movies, a film production company, was established in 1970 by Telugu actor Krishna and his brothers. The company made its debut with the film Agni Pariksha (1970). Padmalaya Movies gained prominence in 1971 with the production of Mosagallaku Mosagadu, the first Indian Western film, which received acclaim and commercial success for its innovative genre.

=== Padmalaya Studios ===
In 1982, the state government of Andhra Pradesh allocated 9.5 acres of land in Shaikpet Mandal to Krishna at a concessional price of ₹8,500 per acre. This allocation was part of an initiative to encourage the Telugu film industry to shift its base from Madras (now Chennai) to Hyderabad. The studio facility, named Padmalaya Studios, was inaugurated in November 1984. The first film shot at the studio was Simhasanam (1986). Currently, the studio operates on approximately 4 acres of land.

== Controversy ==
The allocation of 9.5 acres of land to Padmalaya Studios became controversial due to the substantial difference between the government-fixed price of ₹8,500 per acre and the prevailing market rate, which was estimated to be around ₹5 lakh per acre at the time. The land was granted under the Andhra Pradesh (Telangana Area) Alienation of State Lands and Land Revenue Rules of 1975, with the stipulation that it be used exclusively for film-related purposes. However, 5.3 acres of the allocated land were later sold to third parties, leaving the studio with only about 4 acres of its original allotment.

== Filmography ==
=== Telugu ===
Year	Title	Cast	Director	Notes	Ref.
1970	Agni Pariksha	Krishna, Vijaya Nirmala	K. Varaprasada Rao		
1971	Mosagallaku Mosagadu	Krishna, Vijaya Nirmala, Jayalalithaa, Nagabhushanam	K. S. R. Das	First Indian western film	
1973	Devudu Chesina Manushulu	N. T. Rama Rao, Krishna, Jayalalithaa, Vijaya Nirmala	V. Ramachandra Rao		
1973	Mayadari Malligadu	Krishna, Manjula, Jayanthi, Nagabhushanam	Adurthi Subba Rao	Presenter	
1974	Alluri Seetarama Raju	Krishna, Vijaya Nirmala, Jaggayya	V. Ramachandra Rao		
1977	Kurukshetram	Krishna, Vijaya Nirmala, Sobhan Babu, Krishnam Raju, Jaya Prada, Jamuna, Anjali Devi	Kamalakara Kameswara Rao		
1982	Eenadu	Krishna, Radhika	P. Sambasiva Rao		
1986	Simhasanam	Krishna, Jaya Prada, Radha, Mandakini, Amjad Khan	Krishna		
1987	Marana Sasanam	Krishnam Raju, Jayasudha	S.S. Ravichandra		
1988	Mugguru Kodukulu	Krishna, Radha, Ramesh Babu, Mahesh Babu, Sonam	Krishna		
1989	Rajakeeya Chadarangam	Krishna, Akkineni Nageswara Rao, Sujatha	P. Chandrasekhara Reddy		
1989	Koduku Diddina Kapuram	Krishna, Mahesh Babu, Vijayashanti	Krishna		
1990	Balachandrudu	Mahesh Babu, Geetha	Krishna		
1993	Anna Chellelu	Ramesh Babu, Aamani, Soundarya	P. Chandrasekhara Reddy		
1994	Pacha Thoranam	Ramesh Babu, Rambha	Adurti Saibhaskar		
1994	Police Alludu	Krishna, Malashri, Brahmanandam, Kota Srinivasa Rao	Mannava Balayya		
2000	Vamsi	Mahesh Babu, Namrata Shirodkar, Krishna	B. Gopal		
2001	Pandanti Samsaram	Krishna, Babloo Prithiveeraj	Krishna		

=== Hindi ===
Year	Title	Cast	Director	Notes	Ref.
1980	Takkar	Sanjeev Kumar, Jeetendra, Zeenat Aman, Jaya Prada, Ashok Kumar, Vinod Mehra, Bindiya Goswami	K. Bapayya		
1981	Meri Aawaz Suno	Jeetendra, Hema Malini, Parveen Babi	Rajendra Singh Babu		
1983	Himmatwala	Jeetendra, Sridevi	K. Raghavendra Rao		
1983	Justice Chaudhury	Jeetendra, Sridevi, Hema Malini, Moushumi Chatterjee	K. Raghavendra Rao		
1983	Mawaali	Jeetendra, Sridevi, Jaya Prada	K. Bapayya		
1984	Qaidi	Jeetendra, Hema Malini, Shatrughan Sinha, Madhavi	S. S. Ravichandra		
1984	Kaamyab	Jeetendra, Shabana Azmi, Radha	K. Raghavendra Rao		
1985	Hoshiyar	Jeetendra, Shatrughan Sinha, Jaya Prada, Meenakshi Sheshadri	K. Raghavendra Rao		
1985	Pataal Bhairavi	Jeetendra, Jaya Prada	K. Bapayya		
1986	Singhasan	Jeetendra, Jaya Prada, Mandakini	Krishna		
1988	Mulzim	Jeetendra, Hema Malini, Shatrughan Sinha, Amrita Singh	K. S. R. Das		
1988	Kanwarlal	Jeetendra, Sujata Mehta, Raj Babbar	S. S. Ravichandra		
1999	Sooryavansham	Amitabh Bachchan, Soundarya, Jayasudha, Kader Khan, Anupam Kher, Bindu, Mukesh Rishi	E. V. V. Satyanarayana		
2001	Aamdani Atthanni Kharcha Rupaiya	Govinda, Juhi Chawla, Tabu	K. Raghavendra Rao		
2002	Kyaa Dil Ne Kahaa	Tusshar Kapoor, Esha Deol, Raj Babbar, Neena Kulkarni, Rajesh Khanna, Smita Jaykar, Ashok Saraf	Sanjay Chhel		
2004	Ishq Hai Tumse	Dino Morea, Bipasha Basu	Ghattamaneni Krishna		

=== Tamil ===
Year	Title	Cast	Director	Notes	Ref.
1980	Vishwaroopam	Shivaji Ganesan, Sujatha, Sridevi, Major Sundarrajan	A. C. Tirulokchandar		
1982	Thyagi	Sivaji Ganesan, Sujatha, Major Sundarrajan, V. S. Raghavan	C. V. Rajendran		
1986	Maaveeran	Rajinikanth, Ambika, Jaishankar, Sujatha	Rajasekhar		

=== Kannada ===
Year	Title	Cast	Director	Notes	Ref.
1985	Amara Jyothi	Ambareesh, Madhavi	B Subba Rao		
