= Devudu Chesina Manushulu (1973 film) =

- Theatrical release poster
- Directed by: V. Ramachandra Rao
- Written by: Story: G. Hanumantha Rao; Screenplay: V. Ramachandra Rao; Dialogues: Tripuraneni Maharadhi
- Produced by: G. Hanumantha Rao; Krishna (presents)
- Starring: Krishna; N. T. Rama Rao; Jayalalithaa; Vijaya Nirmala
- Cinematography: V. S. R. Swamy
- Edited by: Kotagiri Gopala Rao
- Music by: Ramesh Naidu
- Production company: Padmalaya Studios
- Release date: 9 August 1973
- Running time: 177 minutes
- Country: India
- Language: Telugu

Devudu Chesina Manushulu (transl. God-made humans) is a 1973 Indian Telugu-language action-drama film directed by V. Ramachandra Rao, produced by G. Hanumantha Rao under the Padmalaya Studios banner and presented by Krishna. The film stars N. T. Rama Rao, Krishna, Jayalalitha and Vijaya Nirmala, with music composed by Ramesh Naidu. The film was a commercial success, and was remade in Hindi as Takkar (1980) under the same banner.

== Cast ==
- N. T. Rama Rao as Ramakrishna / Ramu
- Krishna as Gopi
- S. V. Ranga Rao as Dasaradharamayya
- Jayalalitha as Sujatha
- Vijaya Nirmala as Vijaya
- Jaggayya as Hari Prasad and smuggler (dual role)
- Kanchana as Geeta
- Kanta Rao as Suresh
- Satyanarayana as Ranganna
- Rao Gopal Rao as Ramanamma's husband
- Allu Ramalingaiah as Lingam
- Sakshi Ranga Rao as Papa Rao
- K. V. Chalam as Gopi's friend
- Jamuna as Special appearance
- Manjula as Special appearance
- S. Varalakshmi as Varalakshmi
- Mamatha as Subbi
- Nirmalamma as Ramanamma

== Soundtrack ==
Music composed by Ramesh Naidu. The song "Masaka Masaka Cheekatilo" was remixed in the film Xtra (2004).

Song title	Lyricist	Singers	Length
"Devudu Chesina Manushullara"	Sri Sri	Ghantasala	4:58
"Tholisaari Ninnu"	Dasaradhi	S. P. Balasubrahmanyam	3:44
"Doravayasu Chinnadi"	Dasaradhi	S. P. Balasubrahmanyam, P. Susheela	3:00
"Vinnaaraa Alanaati Venuganam"	Aarudhra	Ghantasala, P. Susheela	3:41
"Masaka Masaka Cheekatilo"	Aarudhra	L. R. Eswari	3:17
"Nee Daggarayedo Vundi"	Aarudhra	L. R. Eswari	3:20
"Devudu Chesina Manushullara"-2	Sri Sri	Ghantasala, S. P. Balasubrahmanyam	4:11

== Reception ==
Giddaluri Gopal Rao, writing for Zamin Ryot on 24 August 1973, gave the film a mixed review. Although he praised the production and cinematography, Rao criticised the film for its unrealistic scenes and poorly written characters. The film was commercially successful and ran for more than 175 days in two centres, Vijayawada and Nellore. The song "Masaka Masaka Cheekatilo" sung by L. R. Eswari and pictured on actress Kanchana became popular.
