= Krishna (Telugu actor) =

Indian actor and filmmaker (1943–2022)

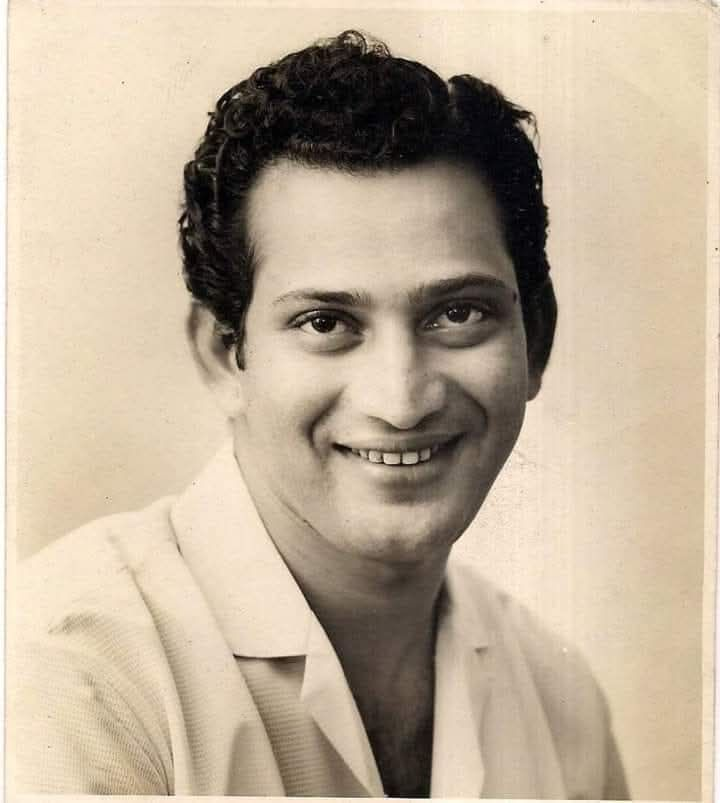
- in 1964
- Born: Ghattamaneni Siva Rama Krishna Murthi; 31 May 1943; Burripalem, Madras Province, British India (now Andhra Pradesh, India)
- Died: 15 November 2022 (aged 79); Hyderabad, Telangana, India
- Other names: Nata Sekhar; Superstar
- Occupations: Actor; film producer; film director; screenwriter; editor; politician
- Works: Full list
- Spouses: Indira Devi; Vijaya Nirmala
- Children: 5, including Mahesh Babu
- Family: Ghattamaneni family
- Honours: Padma Bhushan

Ghattamaneni Siva Rama Krishna Murthy (31 May 1943 – 15 November 2022), known mononymously as Krishna, was an Indian actor, director, screenwriter, producer and editor known for his work in Telugu cinema. In a career spanning more than five decades, he starred in over 350 films in a variety of roles. He is referred to as "Superstar" and "Nata Sekhara" in the media. In 2009, for his contributions to Indian cinema the Indian government awarded him the Padma Bhushan, the third-highest civilian award in the country. He was elected as a Member of Parliament for the Congress party in 1989. In 1997, he received the Filmfare Lifetime Achievement Award – South in addition to Honorary doctorate from Andhra University in 2008.

Krishna began his film career with minor roles in films such as Kula Gotralu (1961), Padandi Munduku (1962) and Paruvu-Prathishta (1963). He debuted as a lead actor with the 1965 film Thene Manasulu and went on to star in films such as Sakshi (1967), which won critical acclaim at the Tashkent Film Festival in 1968. In 1972, he starred in Pandanti Kapuram, which garnered the National Film Award for Best Feature Film in Telugu for that year. He has essayed roles across different genres including mythological, drama, western, fantasy, action, spy, and historical films.

Krishna is recognised for contributing to several technological advancements in Telugu cinema, including the first full-length Cinemascope film, Alluri Seetarama Raju (1974), and the first 70 mm film, Simhasanam (1986). He also introduced the spy genre with Gudachari 116 (1966) and the western genre with Mosagallaku Mosagadu (1971). Notably, Mosagallaku Mosagadu is considered the first true western genre film in Indian cinema. Following Gudachari 116, Krishna also featured in several spy films.

Krishna directed 17 feature films and produced many films under his Padmalaya Studios banner along with his brothers Adiseshagiri Rao and Hanumantha Rao. As a director, his works include Sankharavam (1987), Mugguru Kodukulu (1988), Koduku Diddina Kapuram (1989), Bala Chandrudu (1990), and Anna Thammudu (1990), with his son, Mahesh Babu, playing key roles in these films.

He is also noted for pairing up with the same leading actress on scores of productions. He worked with Vijaya Nirmala on 48 films and with Jayaprada on 47. He worked with major directors including Adurthi Subba Rao, K. S. R. Das, V. Madhusudhana Rao, K. Viswanath, Bapu, Dasari Narayana Rao, and K. Raghavendra Rao. He died on 15 November 2022 due to cardiac arrest.

== Early and personal life ==
Krishna was born on 31 May 1943 in a Telugu family to Ghattamaneni Raghavayya Chowdary and Ghattamaneni Nagaratnamma in Burripalem, Guntur district, Andhra Pradesh.

Krishna was married to Indira Devi. They had five children: two sons, film producer Ramesh Babu and actor Mahesh Babu; and three daughters, Padmavathi, Manjula, and Priyadarshini. Krishna later married Vijaya Nirmala.

== Film career ==
=== Early work: 1962–1965 ===
His career began with minor roles in films such as Padandi Munduku (1962), Kula Gotralu (1962) and Paruvu-Prathishta (1963). He then acted in Thene Manasulu (1965) which changed his career. There was pressure to remove Krishna from the film owing to concerns expressed by buyers, though Adurthi was adamant about his decision. Thene Manasulu ultimately hit screens and was a resounding box office success.

=== Breakthrough: 1966–1975 ===
Krishna became a household name with the runaway success of the iconic Telugu spy film Gudachaari 116 (1966). He was also known as the Andhra James Bond after he brought many James Bond-style spy movies to the Telugu silver screen.

Though action films were his forte, Krishna also acted in family drama films such as Marapurani Katha (1967), Atthagaaru Kotthakodalu (1968) and Undamma Bottu Pedatha (1968).

He also worked with established actors, such as N. T. Rama Rao and Akkineni Nageswara Rao, in films such as Stree Janma (1967), Niluvu Dopidi (1968), Manchi Kutumbam (1968), Vichitra Kutumbam (1969), Akka Chellelu (1970) during this period.

Krishna and Vijaya Nirmala complimented each other in the 48 films they did together. In addition to Sakshi (1967), Krishna and Vijaya Nirmala collaborated on Manchi Kutumbam (1968), Vichitra Kutumbam (1969), Akka Chellelu (1970), Mosagallaku Mosagadu (1971) and Pandanti Kapuram (1972). Krishna became famous across the nation when his family drama Pandanti Kapuram, which ran for over 175 days in the erstwhile Andhra Pradesh, earned him a slot in the highly competitive family hero league and a National Film Award for Best Feature Film in Telugu.

At this time, Krishna established his production house, Padmalaya Movies and produced several big-budget films such as Agni Pariksha (1970), Mosagallaku Mosagadu (1971), Pandanti Kapuram (1972) and Devudu Chesina Manushulu (1973). With his second wife Vijaya Nirmala, Krishna set up another production house called Vijaya Krishna movies, and produced some critically acclaimed films, including Meena (1973) and Devadasu (1974).

Krishna broke many records with his 100th film Alluri Seetarama Raju (1974) under his home banner Padmalaya Studios. The biographical action film won the National Film Award for Best Lyrics for the song 'Telugu Veera Levara' penned by the late poet Sri Sri. The film also won the Nandi Award for Best Feature Film and was screened at the International Film Festival of India and the Tashkent Film Festival. The film ran in theatres for 175 days and emerged as the highest-grossing Telugu film of the year. Such was the success of Alluri Seetarama Raju that none of his next 14 films could match the hype for the classic, and they hardly made a mark at the box office.

=== Continued success: 1976–1989 ===
With star heroine Jaya Prada, Krishna worked in about 47 movies. They were paired for the first time on screen with the 1976 film Shri Rajeshwari Vilas Coffee Club. He then worked with her on Eenati Bandham Yenatido (1977), Kurukshetram (1977), Agent Gopi (1978), Kotta Alludu (1979), Rahasya Gudachari (1981), Ooruki Monagadu (1981), Jataadu (1981), and Nivuru Gappina Nippu (1982) among others.

Krishna and Sridevi were among the most successful on-screen couples in Tollywood, having acted in about 31 films together. Some of their most memorable works are Burripalem Bullodu (1979), Gharana Donga (1980), Maama Allulla Sawaal (1980), Ram Robert Rahim (1980), Chuttalunnaru Jagratha (1980), and Maharajasri Mayagadu (1988).

Krishna redeemed himself with Paadi Pantalu (1976) and went on to headline and bankroll the mythological film titled Kurukshetram (1977). The film's announcement took the Telugu film industry by storm and also paved way for a star war with N. T. Rama Rao, who went on to make Daana Veera Soora Karna (1977) along the same lines. Following this, Krishna made a few films that directly attacked NTR, setting off the rivalry between their respective fans. His personality set him apart from his contemporaries and earned him the sobriquet 'daring and dashing hero'.

1979 turned out to be an eventful year for Krishna, with six of his films becoming money spinners at the box office. 1982 was yet another milestone year for Krishna as he launched Padmalaya Studios and produced his 200th film Eenadu.

Krishna and Vijayashanti starred together in some hit films such as Krishnavataram (1982), Agni Parvatam (1985), Brahmastram (1986), Sardar Krishnama Naidu (1987), Donga Garu Swagatham (1987), Aswaddhama (1988) and Goonda Rajyam (1989).

Krishna was also part of super hit films like Pachani Kapuram (1985), Simhasanam (1986), Khaidi Rudrayya (1986), Muddayi (1987), Goonda Rajyam (1989), Gudachari 117 (1989), Sahasame Naa Oopiri (1989) and Koduku Diddina Kapuram (1989).

=== Later work: 1990–2016 ===
In the 90's, Krishna reinvented himself, playing the roles of the avuncular and ruthless gangster, big brother, and cameos in action dramas.

In 1993, he came back strongly with the unexpected super-success of Pacchani Samsaaram. But it was Varasudu, his second release in the year, which made him the cynosure of the film fraternity again. With the films Number 1 (1994) and Amma Donga (1995) he had thumping successes. Krishna produced and directed the 2004 Hindi film Ishq Hai Tumse, a remake of the Telugu film Sampangi. The same year, he played the role of Jesus in Shanti Sandesham.

Andhra University felicitated Krishna with an honorary doctorate in 2008. In recognition of his contribution to Telugu film industry as an actor, director, producer and writer, the government of India awarded him Padma Bhushan in 2009.

Krishna's last major movie to be released was Sri Sri in 2016 after which he bid adieu to films and had stayed away from the limelight.

== Political career ==
Krishna joined the Congress Party under the leadership of Rajiv Gandhi. He contested in the 1989 elections from the Parliament constituency in Eluru and won the seat. At the same time, NTR was leading the National Front and was at the pinnacle of his political career. By a margin of 71,000 votes, he defeated Bolla Bulliramaiah, the TDP's incumbent MP. However, Krishna was defeated by Bulliramaiah in the ensuing 1991 election by a margin of 47,000 votes.

== Death ==
On 14 November 2022, Krishna suffered a heart attack and was rushed to a hospital in Hyderabad. His health deteriorated and he was put on a ventilator. He died in the early hours of 15 November 2022, at the age of 79. On 16 November 2022, Krishna was cremated with full state honours.

== Awards ==
Civilian Honors

- Padma Bhushan – 2009
- Doctorate – Andhra University

Nandi Awards

- Nandi Award for Best Actor – Alluri Sita Rama Raju – 1974

NTR National Award

- NTR National Award for the year 2003.

Filmfare Awards South

- Filmfare Lifetime Achievement Award – South in 1997.
