= Samarasimha Reddy =

- Theatrical release poster
- Directed by: B. Gopal
- Written by: V. Vijayendra Prasad; Ratna Kumar; Paruchuri Brothers (dialogues)
- Produced by: Chengala Venkat Rao
- Starring: Nandamuri Balakrishna; Anjala Zaveri; Simran; Sanghavi
- Cinematography: V. S. R. Swamy
- Edited by: Kotagiri Venkateswara Rao
- Music by: Mani Sharma
- Production company: Satyanarayanamma Productions
- Release date: 13 January 1999
- Running time: 148 minutes
- Country: India
- Language: Telugu
- Budget: ₹6 crore
- Box office: ₹30 crore

Samarasimha Reddy is a 1999 Indian Telugu-language action drama film directed by B. Gopal and produced by Chengala Venkat Rao. It stars Nandamuri Balakrishna in the title role alongside Anjala Zaveri, Simran, Sanghavi, with music composed by Mani Sharma. The film is written by V. Vijayendra Prasad along with Ratna Kumar and Paruchuri brothers.

Samarasimha Reddy released on 13 January 1999 and was a major commercial success at the box office, becoming an Industry Hit and emerging as the highest-grossing Telugu film at the time of its release. It grossed over ₹30 crore on a budget of ₹6 crore and was eventually dubbed and released in Tamil under the title Shanmuga Pandian.. The film also won a Filmfare Award South and a Nandi Award.

== Cast ==
- Balakrishna as Samarasimha Reddy / Abbulu / Vasu
- Anjala Zaveri as Anjali
- Simran as Srikakulam Chittamma
- Sanghavi as Neelaveni
- Jayachitra as Kantamma, Vasu, Sangeeta, Sarala, & Saraswati's stepmother
- Jaya Prakash Reddy as Veera Raghava Reddy
- Satyanarayana as Police Commissioner
- Kota Srinivasa Rao
- Thilakan as Narasimha Reddy, Samarasimha Reddy's father
- Sumitra as Samarasimha Reddy's mother
- Prithvi as Vaasu
- Siva Parvathi as Samarasimha Reddy's sister
- Brahmanandam as Kotilingam
- M. S. Narayana
- Sujitha
- Sangita Madhavan Nair
- Jayalalita
- Venu Madhav
- Ahuti Prasad
- Mohan Raj
- Satya Prakash
- Devraj as Veera Raghava Reddy's son
- Vinod as Veera Shankara Reddy, Veera Raghava Reddy's oldest son
- Hemanth Ravan as Veera Rajendra Reddy, Veera Raghava Reddy's youngest son
- Basha as Veera Raghava Reddy's son
- AVS
- Gundu Hanumantha Rao
- Ironleg Sastri
- Duvvasi Mohan
- Bandla Ganesh
- Suresh Yerra
- Syreshta
- Ramya Sri
- Padma Jayanthi
- Master Baladitya

== Production ==
Screenwriters Paruchuri Brothers and director B. Gopal had discussed nearly 25 to 30 stories for the film. After many discussions, the trio finalized on a faction-based storyline.

Filming took place majorly at Ramoji Film City in Hyderabad.

== Soundtrack ==
Samarasimha Reddy

Soundtrack album by Mani Sharma
- Released: 1998
- Recorded: 1998
- Genre: Soundtrack
- Length: 28:38
- Label: Supreme Music
- Producer: Mani Sharma

Mani Sharma chronology
Anaganaga O Ammayi (1999)	Samarasimha Reddy (1998)	Manasichi Choodu (1998)

Music was composed by Mani Sharma. Music released on Supreme Music Company. All songs chartbusters tracks.

Track-List
No.	Title	Lyrics	Singer(s)	Length
1.	"Nandamuri Nayakaa"	Bhuvana Chandra	S. P. Balasubrahmanyam, Chitra	5:12
2.	"Andhaala Adabomma"	Sirivennela Sitarama Sastry	Udit Narayan, Sujatha	4:44
3.	"Lady Lady"	Bhuvana Chandra	Mano, Sujatha	5:01
4.	"Raavayya Muddula"	Vennelakanti	S. P. Balasubrahmanyam, Chitra	4:01
5.	"Adees Abbabba"	Veturi	Mano, Radhika	4:34
6.	"Chaligaa Undannade"	Bhuvana Chandra	S. P. Balasubrahmanyam, Chitra	4:56
Total length:				28:38

== Reception ==
=== Critical reception ===
Full Hyderabad rated the film 7.5 and wrote, "The biggest strength of the film is its script that has action and sentiments in the right combination."

=== Box office ===
The film had a 227-day run at three theatres, 175 days run at (28 direct + 1 shift) total 29 centres, 50 days at 122 centres, 100 days at 72 direct and late & indirect 32 centres, total 104, and also had a 365-day run at one theatre.

== Legacy ==
At the time of the film's theatrical release in the 1990s, romantic dramas/romantic comedies and family-based films dominated the box-office. It was the only film that became a box-office hit without a love track at that time. Samarasimha Reddy paved the path for Telugu filmmakers to make successful commercial films in the same setting.

In the following years, many faction-based films were made in Telugu cinema, such as Jayam Manadera (2000), Narasimha Naidu (2001), Aadi (2002), Indra (2002), Chennakesava Reddy (2002), Okkadu (2003), and Samba (2004).

== Awards ==
Filmfare Awards South

- Filmfare Award for Best Director – Telugu – B. Gopal

Nandi Awards

- Best Costume Designer – Rambabu
