= B. Gopal =

Indian Telugu film director

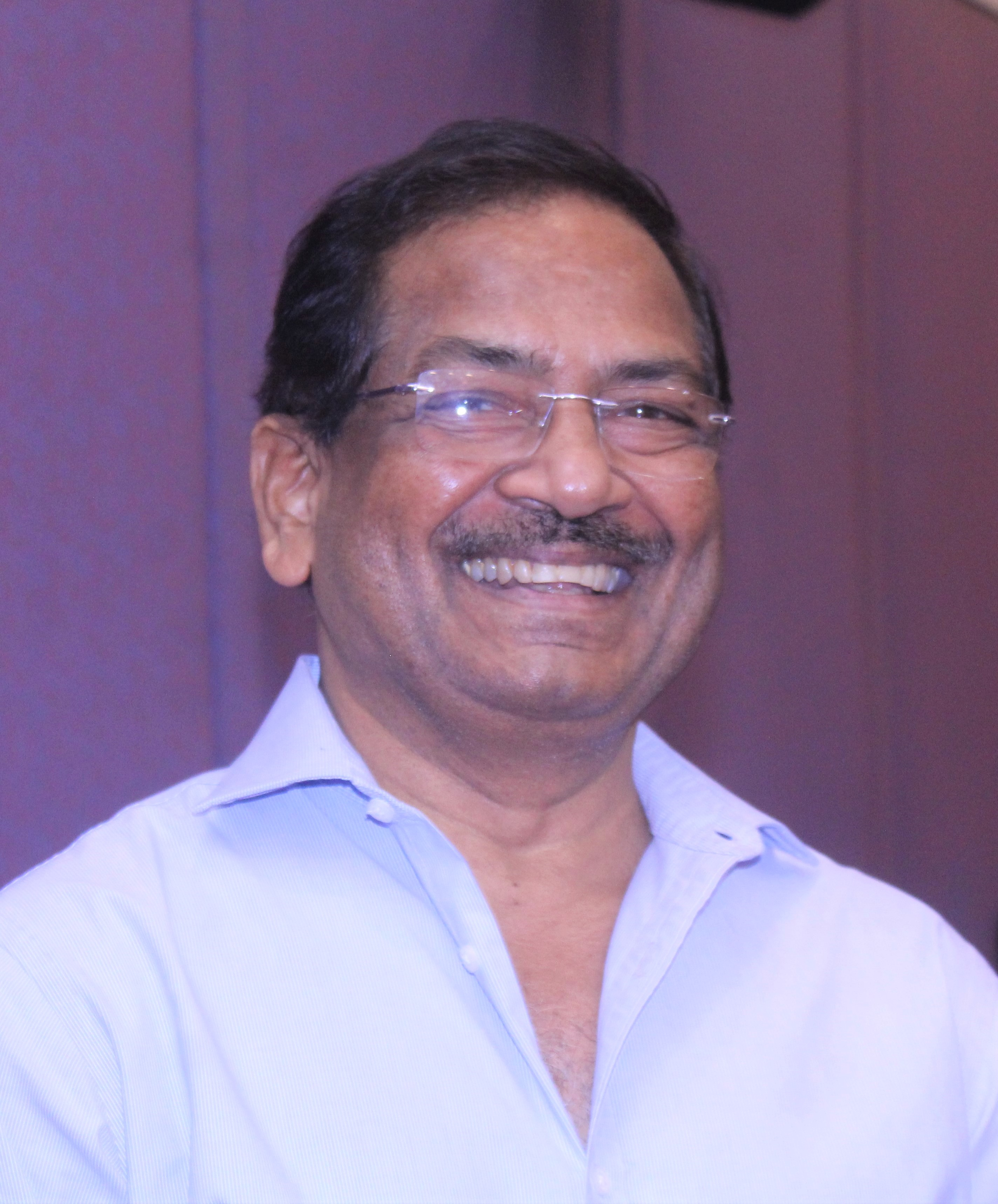
- Born: Bejawada Gopal; Nidamanuru, Andhra Pradesh, India
- Occupation: Director
- Years active: 1977 – present

Bejawada Gopal is an Indian film director who works in Telugu cinema. He has directed over 30 Telugu films, including successful films such as Bobbili Raja, Lorry Driver, Assembly Rowdy, State Rowdy, Rowdy Inspector, Samarasimha Reddy, Narasimha Naidu, Indra, Maska. He won Filmfare Award for Best Director – Telugu for the film Samarasimha Reddy. He has also directed two Hindi films, Insaaf Ki Awaaz and Kanoon Apna Apna.

== Childhood and early years ==
B. Gopal was born at M. Nidamanuru village near Tangutur, Prakasam district, Andhra Pradesh to B. Venkateswarulu and Mahalakshmi. He has two siblings, one brother Subba Rao and sister Suseela. He did his schooling in Karumanchi. Later he attended C.S.R.Sarma college in Ongole. After finishing his education, With his father permission he chose to pursue his career in movies. He is the uncle of Telugu film Actor Venu Thottempudi.

== Career ==
He started his career working as an assistant director under P. C. Reddy. After working in two films under his guidance, he got an opportunity to work as an assistant director in Adavi Ramudu, under K. Raghavendra Rao. He considers K. Raghavendra Rao as his mentor and guru in the industry. He worked under him for almost 12 years, in Adavi Ramudu, Devatha, Justice Chowdary, Agni Parvatam etc. In 1982, while he was working as an associate director for Devatha, he was spotted by the producer of the film, Dr. Daggubati Ramanaidu. Impressed by his work and knowledge, Ramanaidu offered him the chance to direct a film under his banner. This led to B. Gopal's debut as a director with Prathidvani, starring Sharada, Arjun and Rajani. It released in 1986.

Afterwards, he went on to direct many commercially successful and cult films like Bobbili Raja, Lorry Driver, Assembly Rowdy, Rowdy Inspector, Samarasimha Reddy, Narasimha Naidu, Allari Ramudu, and Indra. His association with Paruchuri Brothers is well known in Telugu cinema. They have worked together on many successful films. He is also famously known for his collaboration with Nandamuri Balakrishna. He was the only director to have 3 industry hits, those being: Samarasimha Reddy, Narasimha Naidu, and Indra. This record was nearly untouched for, till the release of Baahubali 2: The Conclusion, in 2017. S.S.Rajamouli became the second director to have 3 industry hits, those being: Magadheera, Baahubali: The Beginning, and Baahubali 2: The Conclusion. Gopal's career hit a rough patch when his subsequent ventures after Allari Ramudu: Palnati Brahmanayudu, Adavi Ramudu, and Narasimhudu became major disasters at the box office.

After a gap of four years, he directed Maska with Ram Pothineni, which released in 2009. It was commercially successful. In 2011, it was announced that he would again collaborate with Balakrishna in a project called Hara Hara Mahadev, but it was stalled after the launch. In 2012, he replaced director Boopathy Pandian for Aaradugula Bullet, starring Gopichand and Nayanthara. It was initially titled as Jagan Mohan IPS. However, due to financial problems, it was delayed till 2021, finally releasing on October 8, that year, to highly negative reviews.

== Awards ==
- Filmfare Award for Best Director – Telugu – Samarasimha Reddy (1999).
- Nandi Award for Best First Film of a Director - Prathidvani (1986).

== Filmography ==
- All films are in Telugu unless otherwise noted

Year	Film	Cast	Notes
1986	Prathidvani	Sarada, Arjun, Rajani	
1986	Insaaf Ki Awaaz	Rekha, Anil Kapoor, Richa Sharma	Hindi
1987	Collector Gari Abbai	Akkineni Nageswara Rao, Nagarjuna	
1988	Raktha Tilakam	Venkatesh, Amala	
1988	Aswathama	Krishna, Vijayashanti	
1989	Vijay	Nagarjuna, Vijayashanti	
1989	State Rowdy	Chiranjeevi, Radha, Bhanupriya	
1989	Kanoon Apna Apna	Dilip Kumar, Nutan, Sanjay Dutt, Madhuri Dixit	Hindi
1990	Lorry Driver	Nandamuri Balakrishna, Vijayashanti	
1990	Bobbili Raja	Venkatesh, Divya Bharti	
1991	Assembly Rowdy	Mohan Babu, Divya Bharti	
1992	Chinarayudu	Venkatesh, Vijayashanti	
1992	Brahma	Mohan Babu, Aishwarya, Shilpa Shirodkar	
1992	Rowdy Inspector	Nandamuri Balakrishna, Vijayashanti	
1993	Mechanic Alludu	Chiranjeevi, Vijayashanti	
1994	Gangmaster	Rajasekhar, Nagma	
1995	Street Fighter	Vijayashanti	
1995	Khaidhi Inspector	Suman, Maheswari	
1997	Collector Garu	Mohan Babu, Sakshi Sivanand	
1997	Adavilo Anna	Mohan Babu, Roja	
1999	Samarasimha Reddy	Nandamuri Balakrishna, Anjala Zaveri, Simran, Sanghavi	
2000	Ravanna	Dr. Rajasekhar, Soundarya	
2000	Vamsi	Mahesh Babu, Namrata Shirodkar	
2001	Narasimha Naidu	Nandamuri Balakrishna, Simran, Preeti Jhangiani	
2002	Allari Ramudu	N. T. Rama Rao Jr., Aarthi Agarwal	
2002	Indra	Chiranjeevi, Aarthi Agarwal, Sonali Bendre	
2003	Palnati Brahmanaidu	Nandamuri Balakrishna, Aarthi Agarwal, Sonali Bendre	
2004	Adavi Ramudu	Prabhas, Aarthi Agarwal	
2005	Narasimhudu	N. T. Rama Rao Jr, Ameesha Patel, Sameera Reddy	
2009	Maska	Ram, Hansika, Sheela	
2021	Aaradugula Bullet	Gopichand, Nayanthara	Released after 4 years
