= Palanati Brahmanaidu (film) =

Indian Telugu movie

- DVD cover
- Directed by: B. Gopal
- Written by: Paruchuri Brothers (dialogues)
- Screenplay by: Paruchuri Brothers; Posani Krishna Murali
- Story by: Posani Krishna Murali
- Produced by: Medikonda Murali Krishna
- Starring: Nandamuri Balakrishna; Aarthi Agarwal; Sonali Bendre
- Cinematography: V. S. R. Swamy
- Edited by: Kotagiri Venkateswara Rao
- Music by: Mani Sharma
- Production company: Venkata Ramana Productions
- Release date: 5 June 2003
- Running time: 179 minutes
- Country: India
- Language: Telugu

Palanati Brahmanaidu is a 2003 Indian Telugu-language action drama film produced by Medikonda Murali Krishna on Venkata Ramana Productions banner and directed by B. Gopal. The film stars Nandamuri Balakrishna, Aarthi Agarwal and Sonali Bendre in the lead roles. The music composed by Mani Sharma.

== Plot ==
Bhavani Prasad is a local leader in the village of Karempudi who works for the good of the people. The people respect him, adore him, and are even willing to give up their life for him. On the occasion of his sister's marriage, he meets Sruthi, a friend of his sister, who has been engaged to an American-born Indian Prudhvi. They both part ways as he asks her to undergo a virginity test before marriage. In the due course of events, she falls in love with Bhavani Prasad. Both families agree to their marriage. On this occasion, Sivanageshwari enters and shoots Bhavani Prasad.

Flashback unveils in the second half. One of the persons who works under Bhavani Prasad gets bashed up by goons of the rival faction – Nagayalanka Narasinga Naidu for no reason of his. They presume that he wrote love letters to his daughter Siva Nageswari and trash the pulp out of him. Due to this, Jatin becomes a cripple for life. Bhavani Prasad vows to get Nageswari married to Jatin, but the story takes a U-turn from then. Another of Bhavani's rivals – Chandramouleshwar Rao joins hands with Narasinga Naidu and plans to damage Bhavani's image and withhold Siva Nageswari's marriage. It is also revealed that Mukesh Rushi's son fell in love with Bhavani's sister who rejected his love and married someone else. To avenge these defaming incidents both these villains unite.

== Cast ==
- Nandamuri Balakrishna as Siva Sankara Satya Bhavani Prasad
- Aarthi Agarwal as Sruthi
- Sonali Bendre as Sivanageshwari, Narasinga Naidu's Daughter
- Jaya Prakash Reddy as Narasinga Naidu
- Mukesh Rishi as Chandramouleshwar Rao
- Satyanarayana as Priest
- Brahmanandam
- Ali
- Narra Venkateswara Rao as Minister
- Chalapathi Rao as Gurazala Chandrudu
- Sivaji Raja as Pandit
- Sujitha as Kalyani
- Srilakshmi
- Dharmavarapu Subramanyam
- Ahuti Prasad
- Mohan Raj
- Ponnambalam
- Gundu Hanumantha Rao
- Mallikarjuna Rao
- Chitti Babu
- Prudhvi Raj
- Bandla Ganesh
- Raghunatha Reddy
- Shobaraj
- Kazan Khan
- Jatin Grewal as Kumar Das
- Hemanth Ravan
- Rama Raju
- Ananth
- Gautam Raju
- Sudha
- Kallu Chidambaram
- Lahari
- Rajitha
- Delhi Rajeswari
- Vimala Sri
- Supriya Karnik
- Sumana Sri
- Madhurisen
- Radhika
- Nirmala Reddy
- Anirudh Agarwal as guy getting attacked by roosters

== Production ==
The film saw the team of Narasimha Naidu, consisting of film's lead actor, director, producer, composer and writer, collaborating for second time. When Paruchuri Venkateswara Rao met minister Kodela Siva Prasad at Kotappakonda, he came to know that the rulers in Palnadu cut their hands for blood and mix it in the Naguleru river which still happens there. This point led Rao to create a plot revolving it.

== Soundtrack ==
Palnati Brahmanayudu

Film score by Mani Sharma
- Released: 21 May 2003
- Genre: Soundtrack
- Length: 31:51
- Label: Aditya Music
- Producer: Mani Sharma

Mani Sharma chronology
Taarak (2003)	Palnati Brahmanayudu (2003)	Kalyana Ramudu (2003)

Music is composed by Mani Sharma. Music is released on Aditya Music company. The audio was launched at Holiday Inn on 21 May 2003. The Hindu criticized the songs for its vulgar lyrics.

No.	Title	Lyrics	Singer(s)	Length
1.	"Gundammo Gundammo"	Vennelakanti	S. P. Balasubrahmanyam, Kalpana	4:57
2.	"Brindavanamlo"	Bhuvanachandra	S. P. Balasubrahmanyam, Kalpana	5:53
3.	"Bandarulo"	Veturi	Shankar Mahadevan, K. S. Chithra	5:25
4.	"Oososi Poolateega"	Bhuvanachandra	Udit Narayan, Sujatha	4:53
5.	"Palaka Balapam"	Bhuvanachandra	Mano, Shalini Singh	4:45
6.	"Sarasala Sundarayya"	Bhuvanachandra	Karthik, Radhika Thilak, Poornima	5:47
Total length:				31:51

== Reception ==
Jeevi of Idlebrain.com rated the film 2 1/2 out of 5 and wrote that "First half of the film lacks any story element and is slow. The second half has some story, but too many twists spoil the mood of the film. The main drawback of the film is that the director B Gopal never got the audiences in his grip with his narrative". The Hindu wrote "The film has lengthy fights, a bit of fantasy (a chair and a train move back and forth at the command of the hero) and some special effects (a battalion of hens belonging to Bhavani Prasad attack a goonda hired by the villains and police as well). But, all these constitute the mass element. The fantasy part would have gained credence had there been some thematic support to the hero's mysterious acts". Rediff wrote "The blame lies at the door of director Gopal. Instead of sticking to a strong storyline like he had done earlier, he overconfidently tries to cash in on his previous hits with Balakrishna". Harikrishna of Telugucinema.com wrote "Palnati Brahmanaidu is a Hi-Tec version of Palnati Brahmanaidu and Nagamma with graphics and modern masala. It is a movie without factionalism and can better be called a fantasy experimented in the name of Palanadu".

== Legacy ==
The film is well remembered for the scene where Balakrishna sends back the train in reverse direction with his eyesight which resulted in extensive trolling.
