= Pitchikalapalem =

- Village
- Location in Andhra Pradesh, India
- Coordinates: 16.0692°N 79.8154°E
- Country: India
- State: Andhra Pradesh
- District: Palnadu
- Mandal: Savalyapuram

Area
  - Total: 14.24 km^{2} (5.50 sq mi)
- Elevation: 52 m (171 ft)

Population (2011)
  - Total: 54
  - Density: 3.8/km^{2} (9.8/sq mi)

Languages
  - Official: Telugu
- Time zone: UTC+5:30 (IST)
- PIN: 522 649
- Telephone code: +91–8646
- Vehicle registration: AP

Pitchikalapalem is a village in Savalyapuram mandal in the Palnadu district of India.

Assembly constituency: Vinukonda

Lok Sabha constituency: Narasaraopeta
