= Allari Ramudu =

- Directed by: B. Gopal
- Written by: Paruchuri Brothers
- Produced by: Chanti Addala
- Starring: N. T. Rama Rao Jr. Nagma; Aarthi Agarwal; Gajala
- Cinematography: K. Ravindra Babu
- Music by: R. P. Patnaik
- Release date: 19 July 2002
- Running time: 156 minutes
- Country: India
- Language: Telugu

Allari Ramudu (English: Naughty Ramu) is a 2002 Indian Telugu-language action comedy film directed by B. Gopal. It stars N. T. Rama Rao Jr., Nagma, Aarthi Agarwal and Gajala.

== Plot ==
Ramu, a servant falls for the beautiful daughter of his mistress, Chamundeswari, who is a business tycoon. After discovering Ramu's feelings for her daughter, Chamundeswari tries to separate them.

== Cast ==
- N. T. Rama Rao Jr. as Ramakrishna "Ramu"
- Nagma as Chamundeswari (Voice Dubbed by Saritha)
- Aarthi Agarwal as Mythili (Voice Dubbed by Savitha Reddy)
- Gajala as Rukmini (Voice Dubbed by Sunitha)
- Naresh as Babu Rao, Mythili's father
- K. Viswanath as Ramachandrayya, Ramakrishna's grandfather
- Jaya Prakash Reddy as Jayaprakash
- Ahuti Prasad as Raghvendra
- Paruchuri Venkateswara Rao as Venkatachalam
- Giri Babu as Rama Chandra Murthy
- Pavala Syamala as Mutyalu
- L. B. Sriram as Sriram
- Achyuth as Hari Prasad, Ramu's father
- Raghu Babu as Raghu
- Vizag Prasad as Chandra Shekhar
- Rajitha as Swarajya Lakshmi

== Soundtrack ==
The music was composed by R. P. Patnaik and released by Aditya Music.

Allari Ramudu

Soundtrack album by R. P. Patnaik
- Released: 2002
- Recorded: 2002
- Genre: Film soundtrack
- Length: 27.14
- Language: Telugu
- Label: Aditya Music
- Producer: R. P. Patnaik

R. P. Patnaik chronology
Jayam (2002)	Allari Ramudu (2002)	Indra (2002)

Track list
No.	Title	Lyrics	Artist(s)	Length
1.	"Oppulakuppa"	Chaitanya Prasad	Usha, R. P. Patnaik	4:13
2.	"Rendu Vela Rendu Varaku"	Pothula Ravikiran	S. P. Balasubrahmanyam, Usha	5:11
3.	"Cheliya"	Chaitanya Prasad	Usha, R. P. Patnaik	4:27
4.	"Jadaku Jada"	Pothula Ravikiran	Mano, Usha, R. P. Patnaik	4:09
5.	"Bodduni Choodayyo"	Pothula Ravikiran	Usha, Karthik	5:07
6.	"Rukkumini"	Chaitanya Prasad	Usha, Ravi Varma	4:07
Total length:				27:14

== Reception ==
Gudipoodi Srihari of The Hindu wrote that "The late NTR senior continues to be an inspiration for filmmakers who venture to do films with the junior. Dialogue writers Paruchuri Brothers, who had scripted many films for late NTR, seem to revel at their present involvement with NTR Jr". Jeevi of Idlebrain.com wrote "B Gopal dealt the first half well with mass comedy between Nagma and NTR. In the second half B Gopal lost grip over the subject and meandered through scenes that are unnecessarily inserted to glorify the mass image of NTR. The touch of B Gopal is missing in making the mass scenes effective the film". A critic from Sify wrote "On the whole director B.Gopal has worked well on NTR?s mass masala image".
