= State Rowdy =

- Movie poster
- Directed by: B. Gopal
- Written by: Paruchuri Brothers (story & dialogues)
- Produced by: T. Subbarami Reddy & P. Sasibhushan
- Starring: Chiranjeevi; Radha; Bhanupriya
- Cinematography: S. Gopal Reddy
- Edited by: K.A. Marthand
- Music by: Bappi Lahiri
- Release date: 23 March 1989
- Country: India
- Language: Telugu

State Rowdy is a 1989 Indian Telugu-language action drama film directed by B. Gopal and produced by T. Subbarami Reddy and P. Sasi Bhushan. The film stars Chiranjeevi, Radha and Bhanupriya, while Sarada, Rao Gopal Rao, Kaikala Satyanarayana, Thiagarajan and Nutan Prasad play supporting roles. The music was composed by Bappi Lahiri.

Released on 23 March 1989, State Rowdy became a commercial success, particularly in the Nizam region, where it grossed ₹1 crore, setting a box office record at the time.

== Plot ==
Kalicharan is a rowdy who kidnaps the leading rowdies from different parts of the state working under two rivals - Narendra Bhupathi and Bankamatti Bhaskar Rao - and provides them with lucrative jobs. Asha has an interest in Kali and assists with his good deeds. To get rid of this "state rowdy," the villains learn that Kali has a mother and a cousin, Radha, and inform them of his whereabouts.

It is known that Kali is actually Prudhvi, an aspiring police officer who was unable to secure the job due to Naagamani, despite performing well at the interview and tests. He becomes an outlaw due to this and turns into a state rowdy to eliminate all the other rowdies by taking the law into his own hands.

When Kali's mother and Radha see him, he is forced to reveal the secret that he is actually a police informer working for Naagamani to bring criminals to justice. Naagamani has lost her husband and daughter in the fight against the villains.

Later, it is learnt that Asha is Naagamani's daughter, and she is accused of murdering Narendra Bhupathi's younger brother Phanindra Bhupathi. The rest of the story deals with how she is acquitted with Kali's help, and how Kali and Naagamani bring their enemies to justice.

In the end, Prudhvi hands over Asha to Nagamani and marries Radha.

== Cast ==
- Chiranjeevi as Kalicharan/Prudhvi
- Bhanupriya as Asha
- Radha as Radha
- Sharada as SP Naagamani M. Rao
- Rao Gopal Rao as Narendra Bhupathi
- Thiagarajan as Phanindra Bhupathi
- Nutan Prasad as Bankamatti Bhaskar Rao
- Jagayya as Vice-Chancellor Mukunda Rao
- Kaikala Satyanarayana as Kamendra Bhupathi
- Annapurna as Prudhvi's mother
- Allu Rama Lingaiah as Quotation Chakravarthy
- Sudhakar as Manthri
- Jayamalini as Urvasi
- Jyothi Lakshmi as Rambha
- Vijayachander as Judge
- Varalakshmi as Lalitha Rani
- Ranganath
- Nirmalamma
- Gummadi
- Chalapathi Rao
- Narra Venkateswara Rao

== Production ==
State Rowdy was produced by T. Subbarami Reddy, marking his only collaboration with Chiranjeevi. The film starred with Revathi and Bhanupriya as the female leads marking Reavthi's first movie as a lead heroine with Chiranjeevi. Later due to date issues Revathi's role was taken by Radha. Initially, the project was set to be directed by Kodandarami Reddy, known for his successful collaborations with Chiranjeevi. However, due to Kodandarami Reddy's commitments to other projects with the actor, B. Gopal was brought in to direct, marking his first collaboration with Chiranjeevi. This partnership would later result in the highly successful Indra (2002).

== Music ==
The music for State Rowdy was composed by Bappi Lahiri, in his first collaboration with Chiranjeevi. The audio launch event was attended by Kamal Haasan.

The soundtrack, featuring songs like "Radha Radha Madilona," "Chukkala Pallakilo," "One Two Three Four," "Tadhigana Thom," and "Are Mooti Meeda Meesamunna," was a hit, particularly among mass audiences. The song "One Two Three Four" helped popularize breakdancing.

No.	Title	Lyrics	Singer(s)	Length
1.	"Are Moothi Meeda Meesamunna"	Veturi	S. P. Balasubrahmanyam
2.	"Tadhigana Thom"	Veturi	S. P. Balasubrahmanyam, P. Suseela
3.	"Radha Radha Madilona"	Veturi	S. P. Balasubrahmanyam, P. Suseela
4.	"Chukkala Pallakilo"	C. Narayana Reddy	S. P. Balasubrahmanyam, P. Suseela
5.	"One Two Three"	Jonnavittula	S. P. Balasubrahmanyam, S. Janaki

== Reception ==
State Rowdy was released on 23 March 1989, following the blockbuster success of Chiranjeevi's Attaku Yamudu Ammayiki Mogudu earlier that year. The strong box office performance of Attaku Yamudu Ammayiki Mogudu heightened expectations for State Rowdy. Distributors in the Nizam region showed significant interest in acquiring the film's rights, with some reportedly offering blank cheques.

Although the film initially received mixed word-of-mouth, it quickly gained traction and became a major commercial success. State Rowdy was praised for its mass appeal and energetic songs, which played a crucial role in its popularity. In its first week, the film grossed ₹1.14 crore, with a distributor share of ₹75 lakh. The film set a record in the Nizam region by grossing over ₹1 crore, a remarkable feat for a Telugu film at the time. The film's success garnered nationwide attention. The Bombay-based trade magazine Trade Guide published an article titled Where Is Amitabh?, comparing the collections of State Rowdy to those of Amitabh Bachchan's films, surprising many in the Hindi film industry.

The 100-day celebration of State Rowdy was attended by Rajinikanth as the chief guest. The success of State Rowdy further solidified Chiranjeevi's status as the reigning superstar of Telugu cinema'.
