= Karumanchi =

- village
- Interactive map of Karumanchi
- Location in Andhra Pradesh, India
- Coordinates: 16.054888°N 79.890265°E
- Country: India
- State: Andhra Pradesh
- District: Palnadu
- Elevation: 75 m (246 ft)

Population (2009)
  - Total: 7,441

Languages
  - Official: Telugu
- Time zone: UTC+5:30 (IST)
- PIN: 522646
- Telephone code: 08646

Karumanchi is a village in Savalyapuram mandal in Palnadu district in the state of Andhra Pradesh in India.

== Geography ==
Karumanchi is located at 16.054888°N 79.890265°E. Much like the rest of villages in Guntur district, it has very hot summers and mild winters. Rainfall is mostly in the months of July to September.

The STD code of the village is +91 8646 and PIN Code is 522646.

== Demographics ==
As of 2010 India census, Karumanchi had a population of around 7441 with 3727 males and 3714 females.

== History ==
Inscriptions from about 1000 to 1400 CE have been traced. The age-old Sri venkateswara Temple, also known as "Pedda Gudi" by local people, is a temple constructed by Krishna Devaraya, a dynasty that ruled the area.
