= Lorry Driver (film) =

1990 Telugu action film directed by B. Gopal

- Theatrical release poster
- Directed by: B. Gopal
- Written by: Paruchuri Brothers (dialogues)
- Screenplay by: A. Anjineeya Pushpanand
- Story by: A. Anjineeya Pushpanand
- Produced by: S. Jaya Rama Rao; Rao Gopal Rao (presents)
- Starring: Nandamuri Balakrishna; Vijayashanti
- Cinematography: V. S. R. Swamy
- Edited by: Kotagiri Venkateswara Rao
- Music by: Chakravarthy
- Production company: Jaya Productions
- Release date: 21 December 1990
- Running time: 135 mins
- Country: India
- Language: Telugu

Lorry Driver is a 1990 Telugu-language action film, produced by S. Jaya Rama Rao under the Jaya Productions banner, presented by Rao Gopal Rao and directed by B. Gopal. It stars Nandamuri Balakrishna, Vijayashanti and music composed by Chakravarthy. The film was recorded as a Super Hit at the box office. The film marked the first collaboration of director B. Gopal with Balakrishna.

== Plot ==
The film is under the backdrop of a lorry driver's union, which compels under a power-hungry owner, Ranganayakulu. He envies his drivers for turning into independents and makes them apprehended by bribing a vile cop, Netaji, with false allegations. A gallant driver, Balamurali, handles a lorry owned by Jayamma and the two crushes. He stands as a pillar to his men and captives on Netaji for inequity. Upon this, a rectitude couple Collector Lalitha Devi & SP Pradeep Kumar acquaint him. Firstly, they retort on Balamurali's deed but understand his virtue by Advocate Kaasipati, a straight shooter, though he is the father of Netaji. By and by, Lalitha Devi suspends Netaji and warns Ranganayakulu. Balamurali antagonizes him on behalf of the workers to fulfill their demands.

Hence, Ranganayakulu swindles the workers, colluding with bank manager Subramanyam, supported by loans via Jayamma, who faces bankruptcy. Being conscious of it, Balamurali strikes on the Subramanyam when Kaasipati hinders and guides him in proceeding judicially. The frightened Subramanyam rushes to Ranganayakulu and kicks him out. To which he about turns his side when Ranganayakulu's acolyte Seenu slays him. During the burial of his body, the Collector witnesses it with her children. Seenu chases them to assassinate when Balamurali keeps them safe. At that point, Lalitha Devi learns the dead body she spotted is Subramanyam's and orders an investigation. Simultaneously, Balamurali, with Jayamma, catches hold of Seenu via apprehends Ranganayakulu. Balamurali recovers the scammed amount and helps the lorry drivers grow as independents. From there, the Collector & SP maintain cordial relations with Balamurali & Jayamma and engage them.

Since the case is tangled up, Ranganayakulu contacts a dreadful goon, Gudiwada Rayudu / Gudiwada Rowdy, who slaughters Seenu on behalf of SP and is scandalous for his suspension. Balamurali counterstrikes him, and the collector edicts a charge. Thus, enraged Rayudu publicly slaps Collector when Balamurali knocks him and surrenders to the police. However, the court acquitted Rayudu of non-guilty due to a lack of evidence. Further, he incriminates the pair in a murder convict when Balamurali bails them out, shelters them, and determines to prove their innocence. Accordingly, they grab Ranganayakulu's sidekick, Nalla Ram Murthy, make him an approver, and present him before the judiciary. Rayudu onslaughts on the driver's colony in which Kaasipati dies, wiping out his son Netaji. At last, Balamurali ceases the baddies and frees Collector & SP. Finally, the movie ends on a happy note with the marriage of Balamurali & Jayamma.

== Cast ==
- Nandamuri Balakrishna as Bala Murali
- Vijayashanti as Jayamma
- Rao Gopal Rao as Public Prosecutor Kaasipathi
- Sharada as Collector Lalitha Devi
- Nutan Prasad as Judge
- Vijayakumar as SP Pradeep Kumar
- Raja Krishna Murthy as Ranganayakulu
- Mohan Raj as Gudiwada Rowdy Rayudu
- Vinod as Inspector Netaji
- Babu Antony as Seenu
- Brahmanandam as Dumbu
- Babu Mohan as Nalla Ram Murthy
- Rallapalli as Guru Murthy
- Tanikella Bharani as Lawyer
- Jaya Prakash Reddy as Bank Manager Subramanyam
- Jayalalita as Boring Papa
- Bhimiswara Rao as Commissioner
- Chidatala Appa Rao as Driver
- Jagga Rao as Gudiwada Rowdy's henchmen

== Soundtrack ==
Lorry Driver

Film score by Chakravarthy
- Released: 1990
- Genre: Soundtrack
- Length: 29:29
- Label: Lahari Music
- Producer: Chakravarthy

Chakravarthy chronology
Bhale Donga (1989)	Lorry Driver (1990)	Talli Tandrulu (1991)

Music composed by Chakravarthy. Music released on Lahari Music Company.

No.	Title	Lyrics	Singer(s)	Length
1.	"Baalayya Baalayya"	Jonnavithhula	S. P. Balasubrahmanyam, S. Janaki	4:47
2.	"Maava Manchamekku"	Jonnavithhula	S. P. Balasubrahmanyam, Chitra	4:01
3.	"Dasara Vachindayya"	Sirivennela Sitarama Sastry	S. P. Balasubrahmanyam, S. Janaki	5:08
4.	"Jingu Jingu Cheera"	Sirivennela Sitarama Sastry	S. P. Balasubrahmanyam, Chitra	4:45
5.	"Abbanee Pattentha"	Sirivennela Sitarama Sastry	S. P. Balasubrahmanyam, Chitra	5:14
6.	"Kanne Chiluka"	Sirivennela Sitarama Sastry	S. P. Balasubrahmanyam, Chitra	5:10
Total length:				29:29
