= Collector Gari Abbai =

- Theatrical release poster
- Directed by: B. Gopal
- Written by: Ganesh Patro (dialogues)
- Screenplay by: A. Anjineeya Pushpanand
- Story by: Kommanapalli Ganapathi Rao; A. Anjineeya Pushpanand; S. Ram Mohan Rao
- Produced by: Yarlagadda Surendra
- Starring: Akkineni Nageswara Rao; Nagarjuna; Rajani; Sarada
- Cinematography: S. Gopala Reddy
- Edited by: K. A. Martand
- Music by: Chakravarthy
- Production company: S. S. Creations
- Distributed by: Annapurna Studios
- Release date: 8 April 1987
- Running time: 170 minutes
- Country: India
- Language: Telugu

Collector Gari Abbayi (transl. Collector's son) is a 1987 Indian Telugu-language action drama film, produced by Yarlagadda Surendra under S. S. Creations and directed by B. Gopal. It stars Akkineni Nageswara Rao, Nagarjuna, Sarada and Rajani, with music composed by Chakravarthy. The film was recorded as a Super Hit at the box office and remade as Hindi film Kanoon Apna Apna (1989).

== Cast ==
- Akkineni Nageswara Rao as Collector Rama Kantha Rao
- Nagarjuna as Ravi
- Rajani as Bharati
- Sarada as Lakshmi Devi
- Nutan Prasad as Elimudra Ellaiah
- Kota Srinivasa Rao as Appa Rao
- Sudhakar as Kanna Rao
- Subhalekha Sudhakar as Satyam
- Surya as Chinna Rao
- Suthi Velu as Mallepula Madhava Rao
- P. L. Narayana as Srinivasa Rao
- Narra Venkateswara Rao as Doctor
- Srilakshmi
- Rama Prabha
- Varalakshmi as Jyothi

== Soundtrack ==
Collector Gari Abbai

Film score by Chakravarthy
- Released: 1987
- Genre: Soundtrack
- Length: 20:21
- Label: AVM Audio
- Producer: Chakravarthy

Chakravarthy chronology
Donga Mogudu (1987)	Collector Gari Abbai (1987)	Agni Putrudu (1987)

The music was composed by Chakravarthy. Lyrics were written by Veturi. Music released on AVM Audio Company.

No.	Title	Singer(s)	Length
1.	"Andama Antukonive"	S. P. Balasubrahmanyam, P. Susheela	4:11
2.	"Nachina Chota"	S. P. Balasubrahmanyam, P. Susheela	3:41
3.	"Bangaru Ledini Korina"	S. P. Balasubrahmanyam, P. Susheela	3:53
4.	"Manmada Manmada"	S. P. Balasubrahmanyam, P. Susheela	3:36
5.	"Sannayi Aapaku Bava"	Mano, P. Susheela, S. P. Sailaja	5:00
