= Deepak Jethi =

Indian actor

- Born: Delhi, India
- Occupations: Actor, voice actor

Deepak Jethi (Dīpaka jēṭahāya) is an Indian actor in several Bollywood films and Indian TV series. He is also a voice-dubbing actor who dubs foreign media in Hindi. Deepak Jethi played the role of Jarnail Singh Bhindranwale in Pradhanmantri in 2013.

== Filmography ==
Year	Film title	Role	Language	Notes
1996	Ek Tha Raja		Hindi	
1996	English Babu Desi Mem		Hindi	
2000	Baaghi		Hindi	
2000	Vamsi		Telugu	
2000	Zindagi	Deepak	Hindi	
2002	Sindoor Ki Saugandh	Sharad	Hindi	
2003	LOC Kargil	Major Mohit 2nd RajRif	Hindi	
2004	Garv: Pride & Honour	Hakeem Luka	Hindi	
2004	Ishq Qayamat	Ajay	Hindi	
2004	Adavi Ramudu		Telugu	
2008	Bhram: An Illusion	Kuldeep Rathore	Hindi & English	Bilingual
2010	Vandae Maatharam	Malik	Malayalam & Tamil	Bilingual
2013	Kammath & Kammath	Vikram Chhetri	Malayalam	
2017	1971: Beyond Borders	Akhram Raja's son	Malayalam	
2017	Sathya		Malayalam	
2018	Vishwaroopam II		Tamil & Hindi	Bilingual
2024	Malayalee from India	Sahib	Malayalam	

== Television ==
Year	Serial	Role	Notes
1993	Shri Krishna	Dushasan	
1995	Kanoon	Peter / Suzy's boyfriend / Darpan	
1997	Jai Hanuman	Kesari	
1997	Om Namah Shivay	Vidyunmali	
1997-1998	Mahabharat Katha	Barbareek	
1999-2000	Jai Mata Ki	Rambh & Durg Asur	
2000	Jap Tap Vratt	Mangaldev	
2000	Maa Shakti	Shumbh	
2000	Shree Ganesh	Vajrang / Tarakaksha	
2000	Vishnu Puran	Kalketu	
2001	Draupadi	Duryodhan	
2002	Ramayan	Hanuman	
2002	Aryamaan – Brahmaand Ka Yodha	Mahasamant Naarak	
2002	Ssshhhh...Koi Hai	Babu	Episode 33 - Zehreela
2004	Karma – Koi Aa Rahaa Hai Waqt Badalney	Challenger	
2007	Ssshhhh...Phir Koi Hai	Kuraan (Dracula)	Episode 6 - Junoon
2008	Kahaani Hamaaray Mahaabhaarat Ki	Dronacharya	
2008	Sharpe's Peril	Daffadar Kapoor	TV Movie
2009-2011	Agle Janam Mohe Bitiya Hi Kijo	Doman Singh	
2012	Devon Ke Dev...Mahadev	Mahishasura	
2013	Pradhanmantri	Jarnail Singh Bhindranwale	
2014	Mahabharat	Virata	
2017	Paramavatar Shri Krishna	Shridhar	
2018-2019	Karn Sangini	Drupada	
2021	Paapnashini Ganga	Daksha	
2021	Jai Kanhaiya Lal Ki	Jarasandh	

== See also ==
- Dubbing (filmmaking)
- List of Indian dubbing artists
