= Narasimhudu =

2005 Indian film by B. Gopal

- Theatrical poster
- Directed by: B. Gopal
- Written by: P. Ravi Shankar
- Produced by: Chengala Venkat Rao
- Starring: N. T. Rama Rao Jr. Ameesha Patel; Sameera Reddy
- Cinematography: K. Ravindra Babu
- Edited by: Kotagiri Venkateswara Rao
- Music by: Mani Sharma
- Release date: 20 May 2005
- Running time: 174 minutes
- Country: India
- Language: Telugu

Narasimhudu is a 2005 Indian Telugu-language action film directed by B. Gopal. The film features N. T. Rama Rao Jr. in the titular role, alongside Ameesha Patel, and Sameera Reddy (in her Telugu debut). The supporting cast includes prominent actors such as Puneet Issar, Kalabhavan Mani, Rahul Dev, and Ashish Vidyarthi. The film is a remake of the 2004 Kannada film Durgi and holds the distinction of being the first and only remake N. T. Rama Rao Jr. has starred in during his career.

Produced by Chengala Venkat Rao with a significant budget of approximately ₹20 crore, Narasimhudu was released amidst considerable hype. However, upon its theatrical release, the film was met with negative reviews from critics and the audience, who largely criticised its predictable plot, outdated direction, and excessive action. Its poor critical reception translated into a dismal commercial performance, leading the film to become a box-office bomb.

== Plot ==
Narasimhudu tragically loses his parents at a young age. He is subsequently adopted and lovingly raised by the entire community of Kondaveedu village, who collectively assume the responsibility of his upbringing. As he grows, Narasimhudu becomes the unofficial guardian and caretaker of the village, deeply revered and cherished by all. The tranquility of Kondaveedu is shattered by a horrific incident: an 11-year-old girl from the village is brutally raped and murdered by the sons of two powerful and influential figures, JD and Pothuraju. These men operate outside the village, leveraging their wealth and connections to shield their sons from legal repercussions.

Enraged by this heinous crime and the blatant injustice, Narasimhudu vows to exact revenge not only on the immediate perpetrators but also on their fathers, who enable their sons' depravity and obstruct the path of justice. The remainder of the film meticulously details Narasimhudu's relentless and violent quest for retribution. He embarks on a mission to systematically dismantle the illicit empires of JD and Pothuraju, confronting their henchmen and allies.

== Cast ==
- N. T. Rama Rao Jr. as Kondaveedi Narasimhudu
- Ameesha Patel as Subbalakshmi (Voice Dubbed by Sunitha)
- Sameera Reddy as Parvathy (Voice Dubbed by Savitha Reddy)
- Puneet Issar as JD aka Jayadev
- Kalabhavan Mani as Ambarpet Pothuraju
- Pradeep Rawat as Pradeep, Pothuraju's henchman
- Ponnambalam as Rudra Raju, Pothuraju's henchman
- Rahul Dev as JD's son
- Ashish Vidyarthi as Police Commissioner (Voice dubbed by Pudipeddi Ravi Shankar)
- Sudha as Lakshmi, Narasimhdu's mother friend
- Brahmanandam as Narasimhudu's friend
- Ali as Narasimhudu's friend
- Banerjee as Pothuraju's brother-in-law
- Narsing Yadav as Narasimha, Pothuraju's henchman
- Satyam Rajesh as Narasimhudu's friend
- Tanikella Bharani as Doctor
- Jaya Prakash Reddy as MLA
- Krishna Bhagawan as Pothuraju's friend-in-law
- Chalapathi Rao as Narasimhudu's friend aide (Master Ji)
- Jayachitra
- Manorama
- Venu Madhav as Venu
- G. V. Sudhakar Naidu as Kaali
- Chitram Srinu as Sreenu
- Aarthi Agarwal as an item number "Rajamandrike"
- Harika
- Chammak Chandra as a customer

== Controversy ==
Narasimhudu encountered significant challenges from its inception. The film, made on a high budget of ₹20 crore, included major stars like Amisha Patel and Sameera Reddy, with significant expenses on publicity and overseas shooting locations. However, even before its release, Narasimhudu faced financial disputes with distributors, delaying its release and triggering street protests by disappointed fans.

Once released, the film failed to meet audience expectations, leading to low attendance after the initial screenings. The commercial failure led to severe repercussions for its producer, Chengala Venkat Rao, a Telugu Desam MLA. Faced with mounting financial pressure and criminal cases filed by distributors, Venkat Rao attempted suicide by jumping into the Hussain Sagar lake but was rescued by police.

== Music ==
Narasimhudu

Soundtrack album by Mani Sharma
- Released: 23 April 2005
- Recorded: 2005
- Genre: Soundtrack
- Length: 33:07
- Label: Aditya Music
- Producer: Mani Sharma

Mani Sharma chronology
Athadu (2005)	Narasimhudu (2005)	Athanokkade (2005)

Music was composed by Mani Sharma and released on Aditya Music Company. Audio was launched on 23 April 2005 at a grand Function held at Taj Residency, Hyderabad. N. Chandrababu Naidu V. V. Vinayak and many other celebrities attended the function.

No.	Title	Lyrics	Singer(s)	Length
1.	"Singu Singu"	Bhuvana Chandra	Chitra, S. P. Balasubrahmanyam	5:30
2.	"Yeluko Nayaka"	Sirivennela	Ganga, Mallikarjun	4:53
3.	"Muddula Gopala"	Vennelakanti	Shreya Ghoshal, Udit Narayan	6:11
4.	"Muddoche Kopalu"	Veturi	Karthik, Maha Lakshmi	4:44
5.	"Rajamandrike"	Veturi	Suchitra, Shankar Mahadevan	5:28
6.	"Krishnamurariki"	Veturi	Sunitha, Kousalya, Tippu	5:16
7.	"Slokam (bit Song)"		S. P. Balasubrahmanyam	1:05
Total length:				33:07

== Reception ==
B. Anuradha of Rediff.com called the film a "huge disappointment" and added "Gopal [..] is fascinated with a formula of attractively picturised songs, big action scenes, punchlines and comedy, but fails to pick the right plot."

Sify gave the film 3/5 and wrote "Narasimhudu is one of those insufferable movies, that is devoid of a basic story and there is nothing new in style or presentation." Idlebrain.com's Jeevi rated the film 2.5/5 and wrote "Movie starts off in an interesting style with a good introduction of the hero. But this graph slides down as the movie progresses."
