= Aaradugula Bullet =

2021 film by B. Gopal

- Theatrical release poster
- Directed by: B. Gopal
- Written by: Vakkantham Vamsi
- Produced by: Thandra Ramesh
- Starring: Gopichand; Nayanthara
- Cinematography: M. Balamurugan
- Edited by: Kotagiri Venkateswara Rao
- Music by: Mani Sharma
- Production company: Jaya Balaji Real Media
- Release date: 8 October 2021
- Running time: 141 minutes
- Country: India
- Language: Telugu

Aaradugula Bullet (transl. Six-foot bullet) is a 2021 Indian Telugu-language action comedy film directed by B. Gopal and written by Vakkantham Vamsi. Produced by Thandra Ramesh under the banner of Jaya Balaji Real Media, the film stars Gopichand and Nayanthara, with music composed by Mani Sharma. Originally scheduled to release on 30 June 2016, the film's release was delayed due to financial difficulties. It was released theatrically on 8 October 2021. The title of the film is based on a song from Attarintiki Daredi (2013). This is the last film of noted comedian M. S. Narayana.

It opened to mixed to negative reviews from critics and ended up as a commercial failure at box office. Later the film was dubbed and released in Malayalam and Hindi as Hero the Bullet.

== Plot ==
Shiva is a careless young man who is dependent on his father Narasimha Murthy for all his expenses. He got fired from his job in Singapore because of a rift he created with the local goon on creating a bridge project. When his boss asked him to apologize to the goon, Shiva retaliates stating he would never bow down in front of the wrong person. This angers the manager, who fires Shiva. Later, Shiva reveals that he had created a scene to get fired from the job as he is missing his family. Murthy feels angry upon hearing the news that Shiva had been dismissed from the job where with great difficulty he had Shiva recommended. Shiva's unemployment and careless nature always become an issue between him and his father.

Due to Murthy's transfer, the family moves from Mumbai. Shiva's grandmother warns Shiva to be careful in the city as it is ruled by the local don Kasi. Shiva learns from his friend that Kasi has a huge ego problem and had once broken the leg of an MLA who did not come to the opening of his mall after saying he would attend and forcing him to come in a wheelchair to open the mall just to satisfy his ego.

At a wedding event, Shiva sees Nayana and falls in love with her. Upon learning that Nayana's boss makes her work day and night and takes all the credit for himself, he goes to a bar and slaps Nayana's boss. Shiva portrays himself as Nayana's boyfriend, which as result causes Nayana to be fired from the company. Shiva meets the depressed Nayana and tells her that life is beautiful to enjoy. Feeling confident with Shiva's words, Nayana goes to her boss's house and shouts him out in front of his house about all his affairs. Nayana's boss reveals that Shiva is the cause of her unemployment. Upon questioning Shiva, he admits that he did this to make Nayana spend time with him and to make her fall in love. Nayana in return tells Shiva to bear all her expenses until her job comes back.

Meanwhile, Kasi comes to Murthy and asks him to give his house off. When Murthy rejects the latter, Kasi gives Murthy 30 days to change his decision; otherwise, he would have to suffer consequences. Here, Shiva brings firecrackers to all of Nayana's apartment kids on her command but hears that the city is not celebrating Diwali until the court hearing as per Kasi's command because Kasi's brother was arrested. Shiva does not bother Kasi's command and asks the children to light the firecrackers. Seeing this, Kasi's goons come to beat them up, but Shiva tactfully shouts that Kasi's brother is released; hence, everyone can celebrate Diwali. Hearing this, the goons go back. Nayana gets impressed with Shiva and falls in love with him.

Murthy sees Shiva and Nayana together one day and advises Nayana that Shiva is not fit for marriage as he does not know the responsibility and to leave him. Nayana expresses anger toward Murthy later to Shiva and asks him to come out of the house. This angers Shiva, who leaves Nayana, stating that his family is everything to him and he cannot bear his father being insulted by anyone.

Shiva asks his grandmother to give him her property so he can start his construction company, which is his dream. In a brawl, Shiva's grandmother is hurt, which angers Murthy and makes him throw Shiva out of the house. Then, Kasi comes to Murthy's house and hits him for not giving him the house. Shiva sees his father being beaten up by Kasi. In anger, Shiva fights with Kasi and hits him badly in front of everyone.

The next day, everyone feels proud of Shiva for standing up against Kasi and praises Murthy for having such a strong son. Being elated that his son is bringing respect to him, Murthy patches up with his son and starts loving him. He even advises him to patch up with Nayana as she was the only one who believed in Shiva when no one did.

Kasi's brother comes to warn Murthy, but Shiva beats him too and asks Kasi to back down. Nayana and Shiva get engaged. Kasi attacks Shiva's family, but Shiva reaches on time to save everyone. In the process, he injures one goon, who gets admitted to the hospital. The police informs Shiva that if the goon dies, Shiva will go to jail.

Murthy, fearful about his son's future, goes to Kasi, gives him his house's documents, and asks his family to be left alone. But Kasi puts a condition that Shiva has to apologize to Kasi in front of everyone as he was insulted earlier by Shiva. Murthy convinces Shiva to apologize to Kasi, and Shiva, unable to say no to his father, goes and apologizes to Kasi and his goons.

Thinking Kasi will leave them alone, Murthy feels relaxed and moves on. But Kasi visits the hospital and kills the goon who was hurt by Shiva so that Shiva will land in jail. Upon hearing the news, Shiva breaks down all the ties and goes after Kasi. The goon's wife admits in front of everyone that Kasi had killed her husband in the hospital, whereas Murthy was looking after them. Upon hearing this, all the goons leave Kasi and his brother.

To get saved from Shiva, Kasi goes to Murthy and asks him to stop his son. Murthy says he will not because if he stopped his son now, he will fail as a father forever and throws Kasi out. Both Kasi and his brother get defeated by Shiva. People in the city learn to stand up against the goons.

The movie ends with Shiva celebrating Diwali with Nayana and his family in their ancestral home.

== Cast ==
- Gopichand as Shiva
- Nayanthara as Nandini
- Prakash Raj as Narasimha Murthy, Shiva's father
- Rao Ramesh as Sivaji, Narasimha Murthy's brother
- Abhimanyu Singh as Kaasi
- Kota Srinivasa Rao as MLA
- Brahmanandam as Deepak Raj
- Jaya Prakash Reddy as JP as Nandhini's Father
- Murali Mohan as Bhavani Prasad
- Sayaji Shinde as ACP Ramchandra, Narasimha Murthy's brother
- Rama Prabha as Subbammatta, Shiva's grandmother
- K. Viswanath as Ramachandraiah, Shiva's grandfather
- Chalapathi Rao as Mohan Rao
- M. S. Narayana as Narayana, Nayana's boss
- Ashish Vidyarthi as Raj Gopal, Nayana's father
- Shanoor Sana as Ranganayaki, Nayana's mother
- Salim Baig as Rakesh, Kaasi’s younger brother
- Madhunandan as Kishore
- Uttej as Prabhu
- Jeeva as Nandha
- Gundu Hanumantha Rao as Priest
- Fish Venkat as Puri
- Duvvasi Mohan as Shopkeeper
- Surekha Vani as Lakshmi
- Sandhya Janak

== Production ==
The film's production began in 2012 with Boopathy Pandian as a director under the title Jagan Mohan IPS; however, he left the film due to disagreements over the script. His replacement was B. Gopal who directed the film based on the story of Vakkantham Vamsi.

Pawan Kalyan was here in late 2013 but he was replaced by Gopichand in late 2013, It was slated for 30 June 2016 but it was delayed to 8 October 2021, it was a failure in the box office

== Soundtrack ==
Aaradugula Bullet

Soundtrack album by Mani Sharma
- Released: 22 December 2016
- Recorded: 2015–2016
- Genre: Soundtrack
- Length: 17:04
- Label: Zee Music Company
- Producer: Mani Sharma

Mani Sharma chronology
Jayadev (2015)	Aaradugula Bullet (2016)	Ami Thumi (2017)

Music composed by Mani Sharma. Lyrics were written by Sri Mani. Music released on Zee Music Company.

No.	Title	Singer(s)	Length
1.	"Columbus"	Narendra, Chaitra Ambadipudi	4:10
2.	"Sanasanaga"	Dinker, Sudhamayi	4:02
3.	"Boost Pilla"	Vijay Prakash, Sahithi	4:19
4.	"Chinnappude"	Rahul Sipligunj, Sudhamayi	4:33
Total length:			17:04

== Release ==
The film was scheduled to release theatrically on 9 June 2017. Financial troubles led to the film's shows getting cancelled on the aforementioned release date. On 10 June 2017, the release of the film was put on hold. In 2020, the makers opted to release the film digitally. However, a year later, it was reported that they were considering a theatrical release only. The film was released in cinemas on 8 October 2021 in India.

== Home media ==
The film's Hindi dubbed version titled Hero - The Bullet was premiered on Zee Cinema on 19 February 2022.
