= Adavi Ramudu (2004 film) =

2004 film directed by B. Gopal

- DVD Cover
- Directed by: B. Gopal
- Written by: B. Gopal; Paruchuri Brothers
- Story by: Rajendra Kumar
- Produced by: Chanti Addala
- Starring: Prabhas; Aarti Agarwal
- Cinematography: V. S. R. Swamy
- Edited by: Kotagiri Venkateswara Rao
- Music by: Mani Sharma
- Distributed by: KAD Movies
- Release date: 21 May 2004
- Country: India
- Language: Telugu

Adavi Ramudu is a 2004 Indian Telugu-language romantic action film which was directed by B. Gopal. It stars Prabhas and Aarti Agarwal in the leading roles, with Nasser, Telangana Shakuntala, and Brahmanandam appearing in supporting roles. The narrative centers on a love story between a tribal youth and his childhood sweetheart, set against a backdrop of forest politics and familial opposition. Produced by Chanti Addala under Friendly Movies, the film's music was composed by Mani Sharma.

Released shortly after Prabhas's breakthrough success with Varsham, Adavi Ramudu was highly anticipated but failed to meet expectations. Upon its release, it garnered largely negative reviews from both critics and audiences, criticising its conventional storyline and outdated direction. Consequently, the film emerged as a box office bomb, grossing over a mere ₹10.90 crore against its expensive budget. Notably, this film marked the final work of cinematographer V. S. R. Swamy, who died in 2008.

== Plot ==
In her childhood, Madhu befriends a boy in a village. Her uncle comes and insults the boy for being a tribal. Madhu then tells him to get an education so people will respect him more. 10 years later, the boy Ramu returns to college, where he meets its most wanted woman Madhu, who falls in love with him. Later, she reveals in her birthday party that she was the childhood girl who told him to be an educated person. However, Madhu's mother, Tribhuvna, insults him and throws him out of her party and house. Tribhuvna is a hot-minded woman who can do whatever she wants by using either mafia or politics. She wants to kill Ramu. What happens then is the rest of the movie.

== Cast ==
- Prabhas as Ramu
- Aarti Agarwal as Madhu
- Brahmanandam as Puli Raja
- Ranganath as Madhu's father
- Telangana Shakuntala as Tribhuvna, Madhu's mother
- Sai Kumar as Narasimha
- Nassar as Peddayana, tribal leader
- Venu Madhav as Hanumanth
- Ajay Rathnam
- Rajeev Kanakala
- Ravi Babu
- Narsing Yadav
- Siva Reddy
- G. V. Sudhakar Naidu
- Bandla Ganesh
- Banerjee
- Seema
- Prabhakar
- Malladi Raghava
- Deepak Jethi
- Ramya Krishna in item number

== Production ==
The film was launched on 22 May 2003 at Annapurna Studio's glasshouse. Krishnam Raju switched on the camera and Dr. Rama Naidu directed the first shot.

== Soundtrack ==
The music was composed by Mani Sharma and released by Aditya Music. The song "Aresukoboye" was remixed from the 1977 film also titled Adavi Ramudu. S. P. Balasubrahmanyam, the male lead for the original, was also the male lead in the newer version.

Adavi Ramudu

Soundtrack album by Mani Sharma
- Released: 22 April 2004
- Recorded: 2004
- Genre: Soundtrack
- Length: 32:21
- Label: Aditya Music
- Producer: Mani Sharma

Mani Sharma chronology
Anji (2004)	Adavi Ramudu (2004)	Samba (2004)

Track list
No.	Title	Lyrics	Singer(s)	Length
1.	"Jinka Veta"	Sirivennela Seetharama Sastry	Hariharan, K. S. Chithra	5:16
2.	"Aakasam Sakshiga"	Sirivennela Seetharama Sastry	Sonu Nigam, Mahalakshmi Iyer	5:48
3.	"Nagaram"	Sirivennela Seetharama Sastry	Mallikarjun	5:22
4.	"Govindha"	Bhuvana Chandra	Karthik, Shreya Ghoshal	4:41
5.	"Adugestene"	Sirivennela Seetharama Sastry	K. S. Chithra, Malathy Lakshman, Sangeetha Sajith	6:08
6.	"Aresukoboye"	Veturi	S. P. Balasubrahmanyam, Sandhya	5:06
Total length:				32:21

== Reception ==
A critic from Sify wrote that "After seeing one feels that B.Gopal has to grow beyond his outdated formula films and bring out something refreshing". Idlebrain wrote "First half of the film is ok. Second half is boring. The plus point of the film is good action sequences. This film suffers with bad story and direction. 'Adavi Ramudu' is a disappointment from B Gopal and Prabhas". Full Hyderabad wrote "On the whole, this Adavi Ramudu feels like dead, decaying matter. It also looks like it". Telugu Cinema wrote "Having made memorable blockbusters like- "Samarasimha Reddy, NarasimhaNaidu and Indra"- the director B.Gopal has once again disappointed the audiences. Being a senior director Gopal utterly failed in casting hero and heroine [..] The story, penned by Rajendra Prasad, has very thin thread. Paruchuri Brothers have also failed to deliver powerful dialogues, even they couldn't make laughter".
