= Vamsi (film) =

2000 Telugu romantic action film

- Theatrical release poster
- Directed by: B. Gopal
- Written by: Satyanand; Paruchuri Brothers (dialogues)
- Produced by: G. Adiseshagiri Rao
- Starring: Krishna; Mahesh Babu; Namrata Shirodkar
- Cinematography: Ajayan Vincent
- Edited by: Kotagiri Venkateswara Rao
- Music by: Mani Sharma
- Production company: Padmalaya Studios
- Release date: 4 October 2000
- Running time: 155 minutes
- Country: India
- Language: Telugu

Vamsi (also known as Vamsee) is a 2000 Indian Telugu-language romantic action film directed by B. Gopal. Produced by Padmalaya Studios, the film stars Krishna, Mahesh Babu, and Namrata Shirodkar. Music was composed by Mani Sharma. Vamsi was released on 4 October 2000 to negative reviews and became a box-office failure. Mahesh Babu fell in love with Namrata on the sets of the film and the two later got married.

== Plot ==
Vamsi is a talented and successful fashion designer who gets an opportunity to participate in a designer's contest held in Australia. Vamsi has a colleague called Sneha, who is selected to model his creations in the fashion contest. Since Vamsi has to study the culture of Australia to design the best outfit, he is asked to tour Australia extensively for a month. Shilpa is the daughter of an industrialist Ankineedu Prasad, who is studying in Australia. She decides to take a vacation after exams by touring the Australian country. Shilpa meets Vamsi in the tour and she slowly falls in love with him.

After the trip is over, Sneha, who loves Vamsi, learns that Shilpa and Vamsi are getting close. She trips and falls down the stairs and gets injured. When Vamsi is disappointed since his model friend is injured, Shilpa surprises him by entering the contest with Vamsi's designs and winning the first prize for him. When Vamsi and Shilpa are returning to India, Sneha decides to stay back as she thinks that an Indian model will fare better in Australia than India. Shilpa lets her father know about her love for Vamsi. He warns Vamsi not to go after his daughter. After a couple of fights, Shilpa decides to marry Vamsi in a temple. As Shilpa escapes from home to meet Vamsi in the temple, Arjun kidnaps her. After waiting for Shilpa, Vamsi goes to Shilpa's house to inquire about her. Ankineedu puts him behind bars on the charge of kidnapping his daughter. After learning that Arjun has kidnapped his daughter, Ankineedu bails out Vamsi and begs him to save his daughter. He also agrees to marry his daughter to Vamsi. The story is more about Arjun taking revenge on the bad guys, which includes Ankineedu and his other gang members, Jaya Prakash Reddy and Kota Srinivasa Rao.

== Cast ==
- Krishna as Arjun
- Mahesh Babu as Vamsi
- Namrata Shirodkar as Silpa
- Mayuri Kango as Sneha
- Nassar as Ankineedu Prasad
- Mukesh Tiwari as Charan Singh
- Kota Srinivasa Rao as Ankineedu's gang member
- Jaya Prakash Reddy as Ramineedu, Ankineedu's elder brother and gang member
- M. S. Narayana as Ankineedu's assistant
- Ali as Vamsi's friend
- Venu Madhav as Vamsi's friend
- L. B. Sriram
- Brahmanandam as Jackal (guest appearance)
- Tanikella Bharani as Satya (guest appearance)
- Deepak Jethi
- Surya

== Production ==
Mahesh Babu later expressed dissatisfaction with Vamsi, stating that the film was started without a proper script. He revealed that the team began production with only a basic storyline and often improvised on set, uncertain about the direction of the film. According to him, the project was initiated under pressure to make a film for Padmalaya Studios.

== Music ==
Vamsi

Film score by Mani Sharma
- Released: 2000
- Genre: Soundtrack
- Length: 29:53
- Label: Supreme Music

Music was composed by Mani Sharma.

No.	Title	Lyrics	Singer(s)	Length
1.	"Veyinchukunte Baaguntadi"	Bhuvanachandra	Sukhwinder Singh, Chitra	5:28
2.	"Vecha Vechega"	Devi Sri Prasad	Devi Sri Prasad, Prasanna	4:54
3.	"ABC Daatindho"	Sirivennela Sitarama Sastry	Shankar Mahadevan	5:18
4.	"Oho Soniya"	Chandrabose	Shankar Mahadevan	4:28
5.	"Koyilamma"	Sirivennela Sitarama Sastry	Udit Narayan, Sujatha	4:37
6.	"Sarigama Padanisari"	Bhuvanachandra	S. P. Balasubrahmanyam, Kalpana	5:08
Total length:				29:53

== Reception ==
Rediff gave the film a negative review and noted, "Take an ordinary Telugu film. Spice it up well with masala. Add sizzling dance numbers. And you get the ingredients of a good dish called Vamsi". Full Hyderabad also gave a negative review and opined, "This one is okay for a lazy Sunday evening in front of the telly, but watching it in a theater paying good money is too much optimism". On the contrary, Idlebrain gave the film a rating of three out of five and criticized the last 30 minutes of the film. Telugu Cinema wrote "The entire film was shot in rich ambience. The camera and music created the right mood. The songs were shot in beautiful locale including one in Film City. Director should be appreciated for making this old-fashioned story decent with right mixture and timing of comedy and action". Indiainfo wrote "Lackluster story, bad screenplay and mediocre direction made the film an ordinary mass-masala film. Even worse thing is that watching ailing superstar Krishna roaring with rage against villains on screen. His ill health showed in every scene".
