= Mani Sharma =

Indian composer

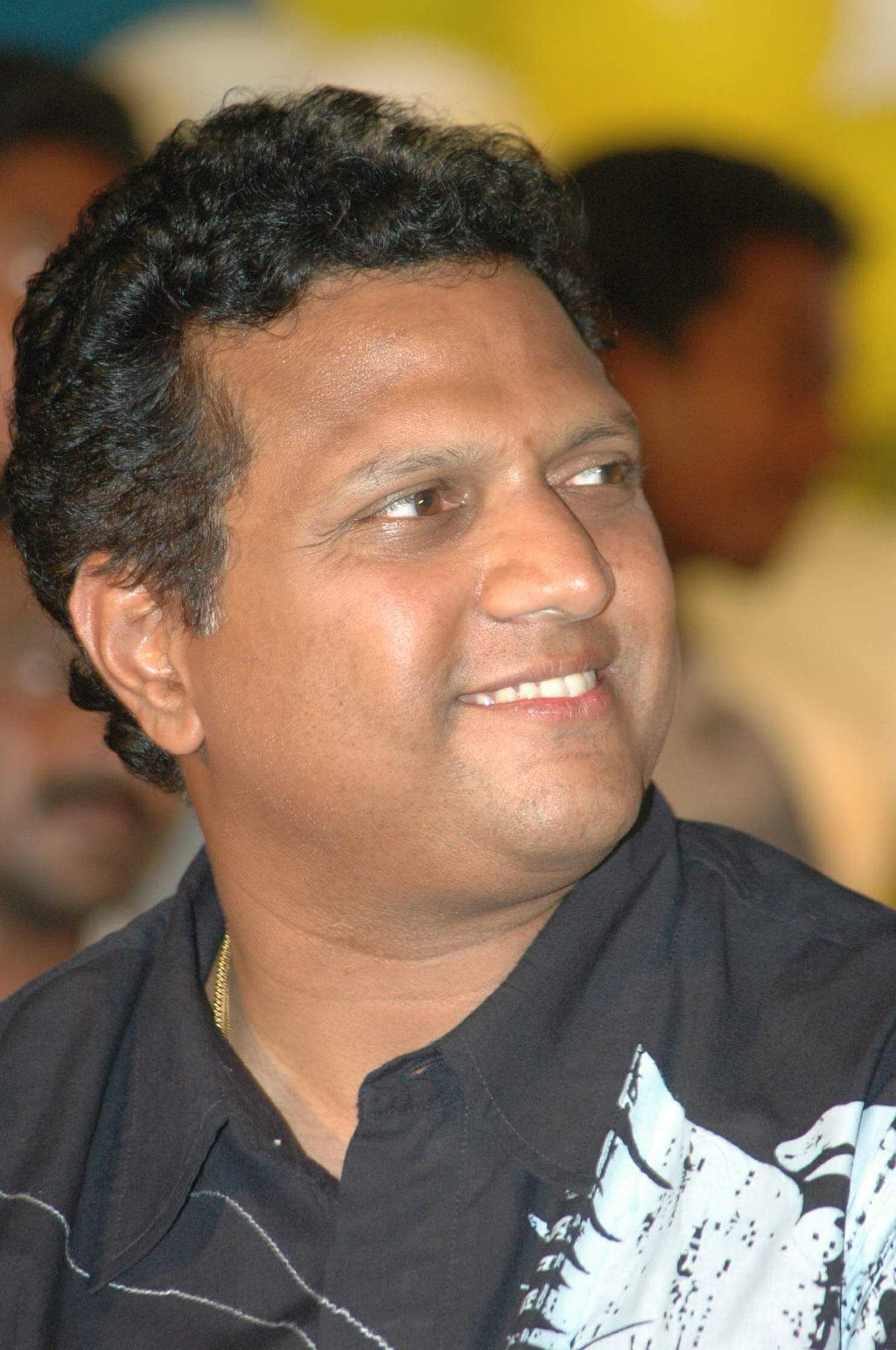
- Mani Sharma

Background information
- Born: Yanamandra Venkata Subrahmanyam; 11 July 1964 (age 62); Madras, Madras state, India
- Genres: Film score; electronic; rock; fusion; blues; Indian classical
- Occupations: Film composer; music director
- Years active: 1992–present

Yanamandra Venkata Subrahmanyam (born 11 July 1964), professionally known as Mani Sharma, is an Indian composer and music producer known for his work primarily in Telugu cinema, along with contributions to Tamil, Kannada, and Hindi films.

== Early life ==
Mani Sharma was born as Yanamandra Venkata Subrahmanyam on 11 July 1964 in Madras, where he was also raised. His family has ancestral roots in the West Godavari and Machilipatnam regions.

His father was a violinist who played with composer Saluri Rajeswara Rao. Mani Sharma discontinued his studies after the 12th standard.

== Career ==
Mani Sharma began his career as a programmer under Satyam and Saluri Rajeswara Rao, later working with composers like Ramesh Naidu and M. M. Keeravani. Director Ram Gopal Varma entrusted him with composing the background score for Raathri and Antham (both 1992), along with a song for Antham.

Sharma was initially signed as a full-fledged music director (songs and background score) for a film produced by Aswini Dutt, starring Chiranjeevi and directed by Ram Gopal Varma. However, the project was later helmed by Gunasekhar. While this film was in development, Super Heroes and Bavagaru Bagunnara? were released earlier, and the Chiranjeevi–Aswini Dutt film was eventually released as Choodalani Vundi.

As music director, he has worked on several films with producer Aswini Dutt, starting with Super Heroes. As of July 2023 he has been music director on more than 200 films, for the most part Telugu but also including 25 Tamil productions and several in Kannada. His first hit was Preminchukundam Raa (1997); Choodalani Vundi and Samarasimha Reddy in particular have been highly successful. He has also collaborated on albums with many actors, including Chiranjeevi, Nagarjuna, Mahesh Babu, Pawan Kalyan and Ram Charan.

His works are noted for integrating Indian with Western classical instrumentation. He is sometimes known as Melody Brahma and Swara Bramha.

Composers including S. Thaman, Devi Sri Prasad, Harris Jayaraj, and the playback singer-turned-composer Karthik worked under him in their early days.

== Awards ==
He has received two state Nandi Awards, three Filmfare Awards South, two CineMAA Awards and three Mirchi Music Awards South for Best Music Direction.

== Discography ==
=== Telugu ===
Year	Film	Notes
1992	Antham	Simultaneously shot in Telugu and Hindi; 1 song only
1997	Super Heroes	
1997	Preminchukundam Raa	3 songs
1998	Bavagaru Bagunnara?	
1998	Ganesh	
1998	Choodalani Vundi	
1998	Manasichi Choodu	
1998	Samarasimha Reddy	
1999	Anaganaga Oka Ammai	
1999	English Pellam East Godavari Mogudu	
1999	Neti Gandhi	
1999	Iddaru Mitrulu	
1999	Rajakumarudu	
1999	Seenu	
1999	Ravoyi Chandamama	
2000	Annayya	
2000	Yuvakudu	
2000	Manoharam	
2000	Kauravudu	
2000	Rayalaseema Ramanna Chowdary	
2000	Azad	
2000	Vamsi	
2000	Chiru Navvutho	
2001	Rupayi	
2001	Mrugaraju	
2001	Narasimha Naidu	
2001	Devi Putrudu	
2001	Murari	
2001	Kushi	
2001	Prematho Raa	
2001	Bhalevadivi Basu	
2001	Subbu	
2002	Cheppalani Vundi	
2002	Seema Simham	
2002	Takkari Donga	
2002	Aadi	
2002	Priyadarsini	
2002	Joruga Husharuga	
2002	Indra	
2002	Chennakeshava Reddy	
2002	Bobby	
2003	Okkadu	
2003	Pellam Oorelithe	
2003	Raghavendra	
2003	Taarak	
2003	Palanati Brahmanaidu	
2003	Kalyana Ramudu	
2003	Simhachalam	
2003	Tagore	
2003	Ori Nee Prema Bangaram Kaanu	
2003	Abhimanyu	
2004	Lakshmi Narasimha	
2004	Anji	
2004	Adavi Ramudu	
2004	Samba	
2004	Yagnam	
2004	Sri Anjaneyam	
2004	Arjun	
2004	Gudumba Shankar	
2004	Morning Raga	
2004	Sakhiya	
2004	Vidyardhi	
2005	Radha Gopalam	
2005	Subash Chandra Bose	
2005	Athanokkade	
2005	Narasimhudu	
2005	Athadu	
2005	Allari Pidugu	
2005	Balu	
2005	Jai Chiranjeeva	
2005	That is Pandu	
2006	Raagam	
2006	Ranam	
2006	Style	
2006	Veerabhadra	
2006	Pokiri	
2006	Ashok	
2006	Stalin	
2006	Raraju	
2006	Seethakoka Chiluka	
2006	Roommates	
2007	Poramboku	
2007	Madhumasam	
2007	Dubai Seenu	
2007	Lakshyam	
2007	Chiruta	
2007	Athidhi	
2007	Godava	
2007	Okka Magadu	
2007	Toss	
2007	Sri Mahalakshmi	
2008	Pourudu	
2008	Ontari	
2008	Kantri	
2008	Parugu	
2008	Yuvatha	
2008	Hero	
2008	Souryam	
2009	Sasirekha Parinayam	
2009	Pista	
2009	Bhadradri	
2009	Evaraina Epudaina	
2009	Mithrudu	
2009	Ek Niranjan	
2009	Rechipo	
2009	Baanam	
2009	Billa	
2009	Aa Okkadu	
2010	Varudu	
2010	Em Pillo Em Pillado	
2010	Subhapradam	
2010	Kothimooka	
2010	Don Seenu	
2010	Happy Happy Ga	
2010	Khaleja	
2010	Kalyanram Kathi	
2010	Rakta Charitra; Rakta Charitra 2	
2011	Parama Veera Chakra	
2011	Vastadu Naa Raju	
2011	Shakthi	
2011	Teen Maar	
2011	Maaro	
2011	Solo	
2012	Rachcha	
2012	Ramachari	
2012	Cameraman Gangatho Rambabu	
2012	Krishnam Vande Jagadgurum	
2013	Telugulo Naaku Nachni Padam Prema	
2013	Prema Geema Janta Nai	
2013	Doosukeltha	
2014	Basanti	
2014	Rough	
2015	Tippu	
2015	Lion	
2016	Gentleman	
2016	Siddhartha	
2017	Aakatayi	
2017	Fashion Designer s/o Ladies Tailor	
2017	Jayadev	
2017	Ami Thumi	
2017	Shamanthakamani	
2017	LIE	
2017	Balakrishnudu	
2017	Okka Kshanam	
2018	MLA	
2018	Ee Maaya Peremito	
2018	Devadas	
2019	iSmart Shankar	
2021	Red	
2021	Seetimaarr	
2021	Black Rose	
2021	Aaradugula Bullet	
2021	Narappa	
2021	Sridevi Soda Center	
2021	Republic	
2022	Acharya	
2022	Bhala Thandanana	
2022	Khudiram Bose (film)	
2022	Balamevvadu	
2022	Nenu Meeku Baaga Kavalsinavaadini	
2022	S5 No Exit	
2022	Yashoda (film)	
2023	Premadesam	
2023	Shaakuntalam	
2023	Ala Ila Ela	
2023	Bedurulanka 2012	
2023	Rebels of Thupakula Gudem	
2023	Mr. King	
2023	Raa Raa Penimiti	
2023	Jilebi	
2023	Madhurapudi Gramam Ane Nenu	
2024	Raajadhani Files	
2024	Double iSmart	
2025	LYF: Love Your Father	
2025	Kannappa	One song
2025	Kothapallilo Okappudu	Only songs
2026	Sahakutumbaanaam	
2026	Chennai Love Story	

=== Tamil ===
Year	Title	Notes
2001	Narasimha	
2001	Shahjahan	
2002	Ezhumalai	
2002	Youth	
2003	Aasai Aasaiyai	
2003	Arasu	
2003	Alaudin	
2003	Anjaneya	
2004	Jai	Remake of Aadi
2004	Gambeeram	
2005	Thirupaachi	one song only "Kannung Kannudhaan"
2007	Pokkiri	
2007	Sabari	
2007	Arya	
2007	Malaikottai	
2009	Kadhalna Summa Illai	One song only "Ennammo Seithai Nee"
2009	Padikathavan	
2009	Gaja	
2009	Thoranai	
2009	Malai Malai	
2009	Thiru Thiru Thuru Thuru	
2010	Sura	
2010	Maanja Velu	Remake of Lakshyam (2007)
2011	Singam Puli	
2011	Mappillai	
2011	Uyarthiru 420	
2013	Apple Penne	
2014	Vetri Selvan	
2015	Inji Murappa	
2015	Narathan	
2024	Oru Thee	

=== Kannada ===
Year	Title	Notes
2002	Premakke Sai	Remake of Chiru Navvuto
2005	Yashwanth	
2006	Gopi	Remake of Muraari; Songs only
2006	Ajay	Remake of Okkadu
2014	Ninnindale	
2015	Shivam	
2024	Martin	Songs only

=== Hindi ===
Year	Title	Notes
1992	Drohi	1 song
2014	Mumbai 125 KM	Also producer

=== Background score only ===
Year	Film	Language
1992	Raat	Hindi
1992	Raatri	Telugu
1996	Deyyam	Telugu
2002	Shakti: The Power	Hindi
2006	Lakshmi	Telugu
2006	Raam	Telugu
2009	Konchem Ishtam Konchem Kashtam	Telugu
2008	Chintakayala Ravi	Telugu
2010	Golimaar	Telugu
2011	Oh My Friend	Telugu
2012	Nuvva Nena	Telugu
2013	Seethamma Vakitlo Sirimalle Chettu	Telugu
2013	Ongole Githa	Telugu
2015	Temper	Telugu
2015	Akhil	Telugu
2016	Hyper	Telugu
2018	Touch Chesi Chudu	Telugu
2024	Laggam	Telugu

=== Television ===
Year	Title	Producer	Language	Channel
2007	Suriya Vamsam	Radaan	Tamil / Telugu	Sun TV / Gemini TV

=== Other works ===
Year	Title	Producer	Language
2009	Chennai Super Kings Theme song	Chennai Super Kings	Tamil
2016	Meelo Evaru Koteeswarudu	Star Maa	Telugu
2020	Bigg Boss (Telugu season 4) Theme music	Star Maa	Telugu

== Reused tunes ==
Original version				Remade version				Notes and Ref.
Year	Film/Album	Song	Language	Year	Film/Album	Song	Language	Notes and Ref.
1998	Choodalani Vundi	"Ramma Chilakammma"	Telugu	2009	Padikkadavan	"Raanki Rangamma"	Tamil	
2000	Chirunavvutho	"Santhosham Sagabalam"	Telugu	2002	Youth	"Santhosam Valkaiyin"	Tamil	
2000	Chirunavvutho	"Santhosham Sagabalam"	Telugu	2001	Premakke Sai	"Santhosha Sambrama"	Kannada	Remake film
2000	Chirunavvutho	"Kanulu Kalisaaye"	Telugu	2001	Premakke Sai	"Olavu Shuruvayitu"	Kannada	Remake film
2000	Chirunavvutho	"Andam Nee Pera"	Telugu	2001	Premakke Sai	"Anda Ninna Hesara"	Kannada	Remake film
2000	Annayya	"Vaana Vallappa"	Telugu	2002	Youth	"Adi One Inch Two"	Tamil	
2000	Annayya	"Aata Kaavala"	Telugu	2001	Shahjahan	"Sarakku Vachirukken"	Tamil	
2000	Vamsi	"Veyinchukunte Baaguntadi"	Telugu	2004	Jai	"Aazhaakku Neyya"	Tamil	
2001	Kushi	"Ammaye Sannaga"	Telugu	2001	Shahjahan	"Achchacho Punnagai"	Tamil	
2001	Kushi	"Ye Mera Jaha"	Telugu	2001	Shahjahan	"Kadhal Oru"	Tamil	
2001	Kushi	"Cheliya Cheliya"	Telugu	2002	Youth	"Sagiyea Sagiyea"	Tamil	
2001	Kushi	"Aaduvari Matalaku"	Telugu	2010	Maanja Velu	"Ooril Ulla Uyirghalelaam"	Tamil	
2001	Narasimha Naidu	"Ninna Kutesinaddhi"	Telugu	2002	Ezhumalai	"Ella Malaiyilum"	Tamil	Remake film
2001	Narasimha Naidu	"Lux Papa"	Telugu	2002	Ezhumalai	"Lux Papa"	Tamil	Remake film
2001	Narasimha Naidu	"Abba Abba"	Telugu	2002	Ezhumalai	"Maina Kunjo"	Tamil	Remake film
2001	Shahjahan	"May Madham"	Tamil	2003	Raghavendra	"Nee Styele"	Telugu	
2001	Premakke Sai	"Chanchala"	Kannada	2003	Arasu	"Malligai Malligai"	Tamil	Original only present in the film's soundtrack
2001	Premakke Sai	"Chanchala"	Kannada	2003	Tagore	"Chinnaga"	Telugu	Original only present in the film's soundtrack
2001	Murari	"Dum Dum Dum"	Telugu	2006	Gopi	"Dum Dum Dholu"	Kannada	
2001	Murari	"Dum Dum Dum"	Telugu	2009	Malai Malai	"O Maare O Maare"	Tamil	
2001	Murari	"Cheppamma Cheppamma"	Telugu	2006	Gopi	"Yenaithu Yenaithu"	Kannada	Remake film
2001	Murari	"Bangaru Kalla"	Telugu	2006	Gopi	"Rangena Halli"	Kannada	Remake film
2001	Murari	"Bhama Bhama"	Telugu	2006	Gopi	"Mister Mister"	Kannada	Remake film
2001	Murari	"Ekkada Ekkada"	Telugu	2006	Gopi	"Mallige Mallige"	Kannada	Remake film
2001	Murari	"Andaanikey"	Telugu	2006	Gopi	"Maleyu Idhe"	Kannada	Remake film
2002	Aadi	"Nee Navvula"	Telugu	2002	Ezhumalai	"Un Punnagai"	Tamil	
2002	Aadi	"Tholi Pilupey"	Telugu	2004	Jai	"Medhu Medhuvai"	Tamil	
2002	Youth	"Old Model Laila"	Tamil	2004	Lakshmi Narasimha	"Devunne Pilichavante"	Telugu	
2002	Youth	"Aal Thotta Bhoopathi Nanada"	Tamil	2003	Raghavendra	"Calcutta Pan Vesina"	Telugu	
2003	Okkadu	"Hare Rama"	Telugu	2006	Ajay	"Rama Anta Krishna Anta"	Kannada	
2003	Okkadu	"Hare Rama"	Telugu	2011	Singam Puli	"Figaru"	Tamil	
2003	Okkadu	"Sahasam"	Telugu	2006	Ajay	"Saahasa"	Kannada	
2003	Okkadu	"Cheppave Chirugali"	Telugu	2009	Kadhalna Summa Illai	"Ennammo Seithai Nee"	Tamil	
2003	Tagore	"Kodithe Kottali"	Telugu	2003	Anjaneya	"Paisa Gopuram"	Tamil	
2003	Palanati Brahmanaidu	"Bandarulo"	Telugu	2003	Anjaneya	"Paavadai Panjavarnam"	Tamil	
2004	Adavi Ramudu	"Aresukoboye"	Telugu	2009	Padikkadavan	"Appa Amma Vilayattu"	Tamil	It is a remix of a song from the 1977 Telugu film Adavi Ramudu.
2004	Jai	"Kanavu Kanalam"	Tamil	2004	Yagnam	"Chinnanaati Chelikade"	Telugu	
2004	Gudumba Shankar	"Chitti Nadumune"	Telugu	2005	Thirupaachi	"Kannum Kannumthan"	Tamil	
2004	Gudumba Shankar	"Chitti Nadumune"	Telugu	2006	Ajay	"Yene Aagali"	Kannada	
2004	Samba	"Tagilinadi Rabba"	Telugu	2010	Sura	"Siragadikkum Nilavu"	Tamil	
2005	Balu	"Inthe Inthinthe"	Telugu	2010	Sura	"Vetri Kodi Yethu"	Tamil	
2005	Balu	"Hut Hutja"	Telugu	2010	Sura	"Thamizhan Veera Thamizhan"	Tamil	
2005	Athadu	"Pillagali Allari"	Telugu	2009	Malai Malai	"Anbumanam"	Tamil	
2006	Ashok	"Nuvvasalu"	Telugu	2010	Sura	"Vanga Kadal Ellai"	Tamil	
2006	Pokiri	"Dole Dole"	Telugu	2007	Pokkiri	"Dole Dole Than"	Tamil	Remake film
2006	Pokiri	"Ippatikinka"	Telugu	2007	Pokkiri	"En Chella Peru Apple"	Tamil	Remake film
2006	Pokiri	"Jagadame"	Telugu	2007	Pokkiri	"Yuthame" (Theme)	Tamil	Remake film
2006	Stalin	"Parare Parare"	Telugu	2011	Singam Puli	"Varrale"	Tamil	
2007	Pokkiri	"Aadungada Yennai Suththi"	Tamil	2008	Yuvatha	"Eelesi Nuvvu"	Telugu	
2007	Pokkiri	"Vasantha Mullai"	Tamil	2008	Kantri	"Vayassunamy"	Telugu	It is a remix of a song from the 1958 Tamil film Sarangadhara.
2007	Athidhi	"Rathraina"	Telugu	2009	Padikkadavan	"Hey Rosu Rosu"	Tamil	
2007	Lakshyam	"Sukku Sukku"	Telugu	2010	Maanja Velu	"Maanja Maanja"	Tamil	
2007	Lakshyam	"Niluvave"	Telugu	2010	Maanja Velu	"Eppadi Thaan Muraichu"	Tamil	It is a remix of a song from the 1959 Telugu film Illarikam.
2007	Chirutha	"Endhuko Pichi Pichi"	Telugu	2011	Singam Puli	"Kangalal"	Tamil	
2007	Dubai Seenu	"Suppanathi"	Telugu	2011	Mappillai	"Onnu Rendu"	Tamil	
2008	Yuvatha	"Yevarunnarani Neekaina"	Telugu	2009	Padikkadavan	"Kadavulum Kadhalum"	Tamil	
2008	Parugu	"Nammavemo Gaani"	Telugu	2009	Malai Malai	"Pooparikka Solli"	Tamil	
2008	Parugu	"Yelageyalaga"	Telugu	2011	Mappillai	"Ready Readya"	Tamil	
2008	Parugu	"Manakanna Podiche"	Telugu	2011	Mappillai	"Love Love"	Tamil	
2009	Billa	"Bommali"	Telugu	2010	Sura	"Thanjavoor Jillakkari"	Tamil	
2009	Billa	"My Name Is Billa"	Telugu	2010	Sura	"Naan Nadanthal Athiradi"	Tamil	
2009	Ek Niranjan	"Evaru Lerani"	Telugu	2016	Narathan	"Saaral Veesum"		
2016	Sethupathi	"Hey Mama"	Tamil	2017	Jayadev	"Ne Raja"	Telugu	The original song was composed by Nivas K. Prasanna.
