= Jaya Prakash Reddy =

Indian actor (1946–2020)

- Born: 8 May 1946; Sirvel, Madras Presidency, British India (now in Sirvel, Kurnool)
- Died: 8 September 2020 (aged 74); Guntur, Andhra Pradesh, India
- Occupation: Actor
- Years active: 1976–2020

Jaya Prakash Reddy (8 May 1946 – 8 September 2020) was an Indian actor who predominantly appeared in Telugu films also Tamil and Kannadam flim theatre.

== Early life and career ==
Since Jaya Prakash Reddy’s father was a sub-inspector, he was brought up at different places in Rayalaseema. He moved to Guntur, where he completed his Bachelor's of Education and worked as a lecturer and in theatre.

After seeing him perform for the play Gupchup in Nalgonda, Dasari Narayana Rao gave him a role in Brahma Puthrudu (1988). He came into the limelight with the film Samarasimha Reddy (1999) where he played the role of Veera Raghava Reddy. He acted as an antagonist in several films such as Jayam Manade Raa (2000) and Chennakesava Reddy (2002). Later in his career, he was also featured in many comic roles. He created a series of plays titled Nela Nela JP tho in 2014 at the Sri Venkateswara Vignana Mandiram in Guntur.

He died of cardiac arrest at his home in Guntur on 8 September 2020, at the age of 74.

== Filmography ==
=== Telugu films ===
Year	Title	Role	Notes
1976	Mutyala Pallaki	College Principal	
1978	Nayudu Bava	Doctor	
1981	Varalabbayi		
1983	Tarzan Sundari	Gang leader	
1984	James Bond 999	Police Chief	
1984	Tella Gulabeelu		
1984	Pralaya Simham	Driver Balaram	
1984	Tandava Krishnudu	Principal	
1985	Kanchu Kavacham	General Jimbo	
1985	Lady James Bond		
1987	Veera Viharam		
1988	Brahma Puthrudu	S.P.	
1989	Bhagavan		
1989	Two Town Rowdy		
1989	Dhruva Nakshatram		
1990	Prema Khaidi	Police	
1990	Lorry Driver	Bank manager	
1990	Abhisarika		
1990	Iddaru Iddare	Ramireddy	
1990	Bobbili Raja	Tribal	
1991	Ramudu Kadhu Rakshasudu	Suyodhana Rao	
1991	Nayakuralu		
1991	Shatruvu	Mayor	
1991	Niyantha		
1992	Chitram Bhalare Vichitram!!	Phani	
1992	420		
1992	Hello Darling		
1992	Pelli Neeku Shobhanam Naaku	Maantrikudu	
1993	Jamba Lakidi Pamba	Hijra	
1993	Nippu Ravva	Labour officer	
1997	Preminchukundam Raa	Veerabadrayya	
1997	Ugadi		
1997	Priya O Priya		
1997	Oke Maata		
1998	Ganesh	DIG	
1998	Yuvarathna Rana		
1998	Manasichi Choodu		
1998	Sri Ramulayya		
1998	Bavagaru Bagunnara	Venkat's father	
1998	All Rounder		
1999	Samarasimha Reddy	Veeraraghava Reddy	
1999	Nee Kosam		
1999	Rajakumarudu		
1999	Sambayya		
2000	Jayam Manade Raa	Narasimha Naidu	
2000	Vijayaramaraju	Home minister	
2000	Ee Tharam Nehru	Rambhupal Chowdhary	
2000	Sri Srimati Satyabhama		
2000	Adavi Chukka		
2000	Vamsi	Ramineedu	
2000	Suri	Ram Das	
2000	Goppinti Alludu		
2000	Rayalaseema Ramanna Chowdary		
2001	Narasimha Naidu	Anjali's uncle	
2001	Khaki Chokka	Janardhan	
2001	Jackpot		
2001	Ammayi Kosam	Police Inspector	
2001	Anandam	Sub-Inspector of Police	
2001	Narahari		
2001	Snehamante Idera	Padmini's uncle	
2002	Seema Simham	Kulashekar Rao	
2002	Parasuram	Mental Anjaneyulu	
2002	Avunu Valliddaru Ista Paddaru	Constable	
2002	Sontham	Gulabi	
2002	Chennakeshava Reddy	Venkat Reddy	
2002	Joruga Husharuga	Bhaskar Rama Rao	
2002	Allari Ramudu	Jayaprakash	
2002	Holi		
2002	Lahiri Lahiri Lahirilo	Achchamamba's nephew	
2002	Thotti Gang		
2003	Palnati Brahmanayudu	Narsinga Naidu	
2003	Indiramma	Madhava Rao	
2003	Nijam	Sidda Reddy	
2003	Seetayya	Sarvarayudu	
2003	Kabaddi Kabaddi	Head Constable	
2003	Aayudham		
2003	Oka Radha Iddaru Krishnula Pelli		
2003	Ottesi Cheputunna		
2003	Veede		
2004	Shiva Shankar		
2004	Varsham		
2004	Swetha Naagu	Sarpararanya Dhora	Bilingual film
2004	Swamy		
2004	Apparao Driving School		
2004	Sankharavam		
2005	Evadi Gola Vaadidhi	Banda Reddy	
2005	Chatrapati	Municipal Commissioner	
2005	Nuvvostanante Nenoddantana	JP	
2005	Narasimhudu	Local MLA	
2005	Athadu	JP	
2005	Jai Chiranjeeva	Shanti's father	
2005	Sree		
2006	Sri Ramadasu	Mathisahib	
2006	Kithakithalu	Soundarya's father	
2006	Vikramarkudu	Home Minister	
2006	Raraju		
2007	Julayi	Reddy	Bilingual film
2007	Dhee	Pedhananayana	
2007	Yamadonga	Ram Prasad	
2007	Godava		
2007	Pagale Vennela		
2007	Tulasi	Chandrayya	
2007	Viyyalavari Kayyalu	Vengal Reddy	
2007	Aata		
2007	Anumanaspadam		
2007	Bhookailas		
2008	John Apparao 40 Plus	Police Inspector	
2008	Bujjigadu	Minister	
2008	Ready	Chitti Naidu	
2008	Siddu from Sikakulam	Obul Reddy	
2008	King	Appaji	
2008	Nagaram	Gudisala Narayana Murthy	
2008	Krishna	Jakka's uncle	
2008	Parugu	Sub-Inspector	
2008	Dongala Bandi		
2008	Gunde Jhallumandi		
2008	Kantri	Home minister Ranga Reddy	
2008	Michael Madana Kamaraju		
2008	Premabhishekam		
2008	Somberi		
2008	Swagatam		
2008	Yuvatha		
2009	Raju Maharaju		
2009	Neramu Siksha	MLA Suryanarayan	
2009	Anjaneyulu	Babulal	
2009	Bangaru Babu		
2009	Mahatma	Dada	
2009	Kasko	JP	
2009	Boni		
2009	Bumper Offer		
2009	Fitting Master		
2009	Jayeebhava		
2009	Kick	J.P.	
2009	Saleem		
2009	Sontha Ooru		
2010	Maa Nanna Chiranjeevi		
2010	Seeta Ramula Kalyanam Lankalo	Veera Pratap's father	
2010	Prasthanam	Bangaru Raju	
2010	Namo Venkatesa	Bhadrappa's grandfather	
2010	Maa Annayya Bangaram	Parameshwar Rao	
2010	Bindaas	Seshadri Naidu	
2011	Brahmi Gadi Katha	Siva's uncle	
2011	Madatha Kaja	JP	
2011	Oosaravelli	Sarkar	
2011	Buridi		
2011	Seema Tapakai	Venkatappa	
2011	Kandireega	Rajanna	
2011	Aha Naa Pellanta!		
2011	Katha Screenplay Darsakatvam Appalaraju		
2012	Betting Bangaraju	Police Officer	
2012	Gabbar Singh	Police Commissioner	
2012	Bodyguard		
2012	Devaraya		
2012	Genius		
2012	Racha		
2012	Srimannarayana		
2013	Naayak	Babji's Paternal Uncle	
2013	Baadshah	Aadhi's father	
2013	Bhai	Venkat Reddy	
2013	Sukumarudu		
2013	Balupu	CI Basava	
2013	Shadow	Home Minister Naidu	
2013	Adda		
2013	Masala	Eddulu Kameshwar Rao	
2013	Venkatadri Express	Bride's father	
2013	Nenem Chinna Pillana		
2013	Ongole Gittha		
2013	Tadakha		
2014	Legend	MP	
2014	Race Gurram	IG J.P.	
2014	Manam	Home Minister J.P.	
2014	Jump Jilani	Veera Puli Reddy	
2014	Rabhasa	Peddi Reddy alias Pedayya	
2014	Autonagar Surya	Corporator Indra	
2014	Eduruleni Alexander	Kotappa	
2014	Bhimavaram Bullodu	Reddy	
2014	Brother of Bommali		
2014	Laddu Babu		
2014	Pilla Nuvvu Leni Jeevitham	JP	
2014	Prathinidhi		
2014	Rough		
2015	Lacchimdeviki O Lekkundi	Somyayajulu	
2015	Pataas	Central Minister JP	
2015	Temper	Home Minister of A.P.	
2015	Noothilo Kappalu	Inspector S. Madhusudhana	
2015	Mosagallaku Mosagadu	Kaushik	
2015	Where Is Vidya Balan	Minister Puli Naidu	
2015	James Bond		
2015	Shivam	Bhoji Reddy's brother-in-law	
2015	Bruce Lee - The Fighter	Fight Master Dangerous David, Police Inspector G. Ramji	Dual Role
2015	Soukhyam	Pellikoduku	
2015	Tripura		
2015	A Shyam Gopal Varma Film		
2015	Dongaata		
2015	Pandaga Chesko		
2015	Rudhramadevi		
2015	Akhil	Kishore's father	
2016	Sarrainodu	Bhoopathi	
2016	Supreme	M.L.A.	
2016	Hyper	Party President	
2016	Nandini Nursing Home	Dr. Venkateshwarlu	
2016	Meelo Evaru Koteeswarudu		
2016	Intlo Deyyam Nakem Bhayam		
2016	Ism		
2017	Khaidi No. 150	Commissioner Krishna Murthy	
2017	Radha	Acharya Deva	
2017	Nene Raju Nene Mantri	Jailor	
2017	Jai Lava Kusa	Sravani's father	
2017	Raja the Great	Devaraj's henchmen	
2017	Andhhagadu		
2017	Goutham Nanda		
2017	Saranam Gacchami		
2018	Inttelligent	Sathya Murthy	
2018	Jai Simha	Central Minister JP	
2018	Jamba Lakidi Pamba		
2018	MLA	Nagappa	
2018	Chethilo Cheyyesi Cheppu Baava		
2018	Nela Ticket	C.P. Ranjith Kumar	
2018	Pantham	Health Minister	
2018	Nartanasala	Satya's father	
2018	Lover	Goon	
2018	Silly Fellows	Jacket Janakiram	
2018	Amar Akbar Anthony	WATA chairman	
2018	Jamba Lakidi Pamba		
2018	Next Nuvve	JP	
2018	Sapthagiri LLB		
2019	Crazy Crazy Feeling	Dream father	
2020	Sarileru Neekevvaru	Nagendra's father	
2021	Alludu Adhurs	Police DCP	Posthumously released
2021	Aaradugula Bullet		Posthumously released

=== Other language films ===
Year	Title	Role	Language	Notes
2001	Aamdani Atthanni Kharcha Rupaiya	Police Inspector	Hindi	
2002	Durga		Hindi	
2003	Anjaneya	Jaya Prakash	Tamil	
2003	Diwan	Kandhavel	Tamil	
2004	Shwetha Naagara	Sarpa Kaadu Dhorey	Kannada	Bilingual film
2005	Aaru	Reddy	Tamil	
2005	Chinna	Chinna's ex boss	Tamil	
2006	Dharmapuri	MLA Konda Mookan	Tamil	
2007	Thiru Ranga	Reddy	Tamil	Bilingual film
2008	Satya in Love	Veda's father	Kannada	
2008	Citizen	Home Minister of Karnataka	Kannada	
2009	Yagna	Varadaraj	Kannada	
2010	Uthama Puthiran	Chinnamuthu Goundar	Tamil	

== Awards ==
Year	Award and category	Work	Ref.
2000	Nandi Award for Best Villain	Jayam Manadera	
2018	Santosham Film Awards – Alexander Special Jury Award	—N/a	
