= Kanoon Apna Apna =

- Poster
- Directed by: B. Gopal
- Written by: Kader Khan (Dialogue)
- Screenplay by: Sachin Bhowmick
- Story by: A. Pushpanand; Ganapathi Rao Kommanapalli
- Based on: Collector Gari Abbai by B. Gopal
- Produced by: A. S. R. Anjaneyulu
- Starring: Dilip Kumar; Nutan; Sanjay Dutt; Madhuri Dixit
- Cinematography: Gopal Reddy S.
- Edited by: V. R. Kotagiri
- Music by: Bappi Lahiri
- Release date: 27 October 1989
- Country: India
- Language: Hindi

Kanoon Apna Apna (transl. Each person sees the law differently) is a 1989 Indian Hindi-language action-drama film starring Dilip Kumar, Nutan, Sanjay Dutt, Madhuri Dixit in pivotal roles. The film was a remake of the Telugu film Collector Gari Abbai.

== Plot ==
The Collector of Anokhapur, Jagatpratap Singh, is a stickler for law and order. However, his son, Ravi, believes that sometimes illegal means may be adopted in order to assert control. This causes conflict between the two. Ravi then falls in love with Editor Ramprasad's daughter, Bharathi. Bhushannath Bhadbole and Kabza Kanhaiyalal are corrupt ministers. Their sons, Kailash and Prakash, respectively, rape and kill Jagatpratap's maid-servant and also kill Ravi's friend. They are acquitted because they gave fake alibis. Ravi decides to give these criminals the punishment they deserve. As Ravi knows this will cause a conflict with his father, he decides to leave home. He then becomes a police inspector. This does not heal the father-son bond, as he still has different ideas about the meaning of justice. After deliberating on the statement that "the law is for human beings but not for monsters", the father finally agrees to join his son in his fight against the corrupt ministers.

== Cast ==
- Dilip Kumar as Collector Jagatpratap Singh
- Nutan as Laxmi Singh
- Sanjay Dutt as Inspector Ravi Kumar Singh
- Madhuri Dixit as Bharati
- Kader Khan as Bhushannath Bhadbole / Dharmendra
- Anupam Kher as Kabza Kanhaiyalal
- Gulshan Grover as Kailash Bhadbole
- Tej Sapru as Prakash Kanhaiyalal
- Satyendra Kapoor as Editor Ram Prasad
- Mayur Verma as Satyen
- Raza Murad as Dr. Mathur
- Jayshree Gadkar as College Principal
- Shagufta Ali as Basanti
- Disco Shanti as Item Number
- Lavu Nageswara Rao as Police Officer
- Abhilasha

== Soundtrack ==
The soundtrack was written by Indeevar and composed by Bappi Lahiri.

Song	Singer
"Pehli Nazar Mein"	Asha Bhosle, S. P. Balasubrahmanyam
"Gayi Gayi"	Asha Bhosle, Mohammed Aziz
"Chini Mini"	Asha Bhosle, Amit Kumar
"A B C D E F G"	Alka Yagnik
