= Nidamanur, Prakasam district =

Nidamanuru
- Village
- Interactive map of Nidamanuru
- Location in Andhra Pradesh, India Nidamanuru (India)
- Coordinates: 15°39′17″N 80°4′4″E
- Country: India
- Region: South India
- State: Andhra Pradesh

Population (2014)
  - Total: 10,000

Languages
  - Official: Telugu
- Time zone: UTC+5:30 (IST)
- PIN: 523183
- Vehicle registration: AP-27

Nidamanur is a village in N G Padu Mandal, Prakasam district of Andhra Pradesh.
