= Narasimha Naidu =

2001 film by B. Gopal

- Movie poster
- Directed by: B. Gopal
- Written by: Story & Screenplay: Chinni Krishna; Dialogues: Paruchuri Brothers
- Produced by: M. V. Murali Krishna
- Starring: Nandamuri Balakrishna; Simran; Preeti Jhangiani; Asha Saini
- Cinematography: V. S. R. Swamy
- Edited by: Kotagiri Venkateswara Rao
- Music by: Mani Sharma
- Production company: Venkata Ramana Productions
- Release date: 11 January 2001
- Running time: 161 minutes
- Country: India
- Language: Telugu
- Budget: ₹6–9 crore (Note: Idlebrain.com estimates the film's budget to be ₹60 million. CNN-News18 estimates the film's budget to be ₹90 million.)
- Box office: ₹30 crore distributors' share

Narasimha Naidu is a 2001 Indian Telugu-language action drama film directed by B. Gopal and written by Chinni Krishna. The film stars Nandamuri Balakrishna in the titular role along with Simran, Preeti Jhangiani, Asha Saini and music composed by Mani Sharma.

Narasimha Naidu was released on 11 January 2001 alongside Venkatesh's Devi Putrudu and Chiranjeevi's Mrugaraju, where it received positive reviews from critics and became a huge commercial success at the box office by earning a distributor's share of ₹30 crore on a budget of ₹6-9 crore and was an industry hit at the time. Nandamuri Balakrishna won Nandi Award for Best Actor for his performance in the film. It was remade into Tamil as Ezhumalai (2002) starring Arjun with Simran reprising her role.

== Plot ==
The film begins with a feud between neighboring villages in Visakhapatnam district, where Raghupati Naidu and Appala Naidu are rivals. Since Raghupati Naidu is peace-loving, the malicious Appala Naidu tramples their town under his feet. He squats the fields of their Lakshmi Narasimha 's temple. Looking ahead, Raghupati Naidu builds an army for which he edicts to sacrifice a male child from a family and accords his younger son Narasimha Naidu. Years later, Anjali, the pampered daughter of a savage factionist Kuppuswamy Naidu, grows up at her maternal uncle's house. Once she inspires Narasimha Naidu's dancer, who manages a school, Anjali joins as his student and develops feelings for him. Though aware that he is a widower and still has a kid, Anjali stands firm and gets closer to the kid, which he reciprocates.

Meanwhile, Kuppuswamy Naidu fixes Anjali's alliance with his nephew, who is the son of Appala Naidu. His sister Nagamani asks to butcher Narasimha Naidu, the one who assassinated her husband as a dowry. Anjali later declares her love for Narasimha Naidu when the bridegroom moves to seize her. Narasimha Naidu & Anjali board the same train while the bridegroom's henchmen chase after them. At that point, a furious Narasimha Naidu reveals himself, causing the henchmen to escape out of fear. Later, Narasimha Naidu learns Anjali's identity and reveals his past.

After 15 years of formating an army: Narasimha Naidu grows up as a gallant who warns Appala Naidu to be on terms. On the eve of the celebrations, Appala Naidu onrushes when Narasimha Naidu slays him. Knowing it, Kuppuswamy Naidu pledges to destroy Narasimha Naidu and his family. Currently, Raghupati Naidu decides to search for a bride for Narasimha Naidu. He selects a generous Sravani, but she is sensitive to violence. Nevertheless, Raghupati Naidu conducts their marriage by concealing his son's occupation, but Sravani realizes the fact and bends to his goodness.

One day, Narasimha Naidu's three siblings arrive from abroad along with their families, who are complacent and negligent. However, Narasimha Naidu endears and adulates them a lot, but they always snide at him. Sravani fails to receive and retorts. Listening to this, Narasimha Naidu exiles her when she reaches her parents' house and gives birth to a boy. Later, Narasimha Naidu's brothers are about to return without viewing the newborn baby and refuse to accompany them. En route, they are onslaught by Kuppuswamy Naidu's men, but Narasimha Naidu secures his family, keeping his life at risk, and safely sends off them. They realize his virtue and plead pardon after soul-searching. Simultaneously, Kuppuswamy Naidu attempts to kill Narasimha Naidu's son, and he stabs Sravani. Before leaving her breath, she implores Narasimha Naidu to get rid of this climate, which Raghupati Naidu also tells him to do.

Present: Enraged, Kuppuswamy Naidu attacks Raghupati Naidu but gets shocked seeing Narasimha Naidu, who has returned to his hometown. Narasimha Naidu hands over Anjali to him. During this, the kid spells his first words, calling Anjali his mother. Later, Raghupati Naidu initiates Narasimha Naidu to bring Anjali as a mother to his child. Anjali's wedding arrangements are in progress when Narasimha Naidu uproars Kuppuswamy Naidu, fixing his match with Anjali, and challenges him to block him. He cracks down on the day of the marriage and perceives the presence of Anjali at the hospital, who has removed her uterus as a sacrifice not to have her progeny. At last, Narasimha Naidu wholeheartedly accepts and unites with Anjali.

== Cast ==
- Nandamuri Balakrishna as Narasimha Naidu; Sravani's widower; Anjali's husband
- Simran as Sravani; Narasimha Naidu's first wife
- Preeti Jhangiani as Anjali; Narasimha Naidu's 2nd wife
- Asha Saini as Sandhya, Sravani's sister
- K. Vishwanath as Raghupathi Naidu; Narasimha Naidu's father; Sravani and Anjali's father-in-law
- Mukesh Rishi as Kuppu Swamy Naidu; Anjali's father; Narasimha Naidu's rival turned father-in-law
- Jaya Prakash Reddy as Anjali's uncle
- Brahmanandam as Hanumad Shastry
- Tanikella Bharani as Papanashanam
- Mohan Raj as Appala Naidu
- Sivaji Raja as Bheemavaram
- Achyuth as Tirumala Naidu
- Telangana Shakuntala as Naga Mani
- Narra Venkateswara Rao
- Gundu Hanumantha Rao
- Chalapathi Rao
- Hema
- Rajitha
- Satya Prakash
- Rakhee
- Ramaraju as Narasimha Naidu's brother
- Vinod as Narasimha Naidu's brother
- Hemanth Ravan
- Prasanna Kumar
- Naveen
- Sridhar
- Mukku Raju
- Ramyasri
- Madhurisen
- Ooma Sarma
- Padma Jayanthi
- Radha Prashanthi
- Shobha Rani
- Sowmya Sri
- Vimala
- Master Ram Teja (Maanas Nagulapalli)
- Baby Upasana as Narasimha Naidu's niece
- Shivanandakumar as Veera Naidu

== Production ==
The film's writers Paruchuri Brothers announced the title Narasimha Naidu on 1 December 2000.

== Soundtrack ==
Narasimha Naidu

Soundtrack album by Mani Sharma
- Released: 20 December 2000
- Recorded: 2000
- Genre: Feature film soundtrack
- Length: 28:33
- Label: Supreme Music
- Producer: Mani Sharma

Mani Sharma chronology
Mrugaraju (2001)	Narasimha Naidu (2000)	Devi Putrudu (2001)

Mani Sharma composed the soundtrack of the film. Supreme Music Company purchased the musical rights of the film.

No.	Title	Lyrics	Singer(s)	Length
1.	"Ninna Kutesinaddhi"	Bhuvanachandra	Hariharan, Kavita Krishnamurthy	5:16
2.	"Abba Abba Andham"	Vennelakanti	Shankar Mahadevan, Sujatha	4:21
3.	"Chilakapacha Koka"	Bhuvanachandra	Mano, Radhika	5:08
4.	"Nadira Dinna"	Veturi	Sukhwinder Singh, Swarnalatha	3:55
5.	"Ko Ko Komali"	Sirivennela Sitarama Sastry	Udit Narayan, Sujatha	4:58
6.	"Lux Papa"	Bhuvanachandra	Harini, S. P. Balasubrahmanyam	4:38
Total length:				28:33

== Awards ==
Nandi Awards - 2001

- Nandi Award for Best Actor – Nandamuri Balakrishna

== Reception ==
Idlebrain wrote "First half of the film is very good with interval being the nerve wrecking point. But the second half fail to meet the expectations created in first half. The episode of Balayya being exploited by his brothers could have been trimmed. This may not be as good as Samarasimha Reddy. But it's definitely better than Goppinti Alludu". Sify wrote "It would have been engrossing if the director had not narrated the story in routine flashback style. Unlike their earlier film Samarsimhareddy, this film lacks any message". Telugu Cinema wrote "Balakrishna as Narasinha Naidu did good job. Director turned actor Vishwanth too played his role convincingly. Simran and Preeti too laudable. The best thing about this film is foot-tapping music by Manisharma. B.Gopal proved again that with Balayya he could do his best".
