= Chennakesava Reddy =

2002 Indian film by V. V. Vinayak

- Theatrical release poster
- Directed by: V. V. Vinayak
- Screenplay by: V. V. Vinayak
- Dialogues by: Paruchuri Brothers
- Story by: V. V. Vinayak
- Produced by: Bellamkonda Suresh
- Starring: Nandamuri Balakrishna; Tabu; Shriya Saran
- Cinematography: Ajayan Vincent
- Edited by: Gautham Raju
- Music by: Mani Sharma
- Production company: Sri Sai Ganesh Productions
- Release date: 25 September 2002
- Running time: 145 minutes
- Country: India
- Language: Telugu

Chennakesava Reddy is a 2002 Indian Telugu-language revenge action drama film, produced by Bellamkonda Suresh under the Sri Sai Ganesh Productions banner and directed by V. V. Vinayak. It stars Nandamuri Balakrishna, Tabu, Shriya Saran and music composed by Mani Sharma. The film was dubbed into Tamil as Aadikesavan in 2009. The film was a blockbuster at box office.

== Plot ==
The film opens in Rayalaseema, where followers of the legendary and powerful faction leader Chennakesava Reddy gather before his idol. They eagerly await his return after a 22-year absence. In his absence, the region has fallen under the tyrannical control of the ruthless Dhanunjaya Reddy and his three corrupt brothers: Minister Jai Reddy, Justice Ravi Reddy, and Krishna Reddy. Krishna Reddy is married to Chennakesava's sister, Janaki, whom he constantly abuses. Meanwhile, in Mumbai, DCP Bharath Reddy—who looks exactly like Chennakesava Reddy—is a fearless, uncompromising police officer. After a series of comedic misunderstandings and clashes with Preethi, a medical student and the police commissioner's daughter, the two fall in love.

In Rayalaseema, an upright Superintendent of Police, Ramaraju, tries to put an end to Dhanunjaya Reddy's reign of terror. During his investigation, Ramaraju learns about Chennakesava Reddy’s past glory and influence. However, Dhanunjaya uses his political power to have Ramaraju transferred to Tihar Jail as punishment. While stationed at Tihar, Ramaraju shockingly discovers that Chennakesava Reddy has been secretly imprisoned there under remand for 22 years. Using legal channels, Ramaraju successfully secures Chennakesava's acquittal. Upon his release, Chennakesava immediately assassinates Minister Jai Reddy before returning to a hero's welcome in his hometown.

Chennakesava rapidly reclaims his territory and strikes fear into his enemies. He reunites with his sister, Janaki, and tells her that he must eliminate her abusive husband; she fully supports his decision. Soon after, it is revealed that Bharath is actually Chennakesava’s estranged son. Bharath and his mother, Devi, travel to Rayalaseema to reunite with him. Preethi and her family also arrive, and the elders arrange Bharath and Preethi's marriage. Realizing that Bharath is an unstoppable force of law, the villains manipulate the system to have him stationed in Rayalaseema, hoping he will oppose his father and protect them.

Chennakesava continues his crusade and executes Justice Ravi Reddy. In retaliation, Krishna Reddy ambushes and stabs Chennakesava, prompting a furious Janaki to kill her own husband. When Bharath arrives at the scene to arrest his father, Janaki intervenes and reveals the family's tragic past.

Years ago, Chennakesava Reddy was a benevolent and deeply respected leader who arbitrated local disputes. He was locked in a bitter feud with the malicious Venkat Reddy—the father of Dhanunjaya and his brothers. When Chennakesava witnessed Venkat's son, Giri Reddy, murder an innocent person, Chennakesava executed Giri as punishment. Seeking vengeance, Venkat orchestrated a trap by marrying his son Krishna to Janaki. On the wedding day, Venkat and his sons slaughtered Chennakesava’s entire extended family. Chennakesava managed to kill Venkat before helping his pregnant wife, Devi, escape the region. Taking advantage of the chaos, Venkat's surviving sons fabricated criminal charges against Chennakesava, leading to his decades-long imprisonment.

In the present, Bharath finally understands his father's righteous path but remains torn by his duty as a police officer. When Chennakesava goes into hiding, Bharath fakes Devi's death to lure him out. The plan takes a tragic turn when Devi, believing her husband's honor must be protected at all costs, actually stabs herself. Bharath corners his father, but Chennakesava manages to escape after a high-stakes chase, only for Devi to die in his arms.

Grief-stricken during her funeral, Chennakesava allows himself to be arrested and jailed. Seizing the opportunity, Dhanunjaya Reddy prepares to enter politics. However, Chennakesava breaks out of prison, storms a massive public rally, and executes Dhanunjaya with the covert assistance of Bharath. With justice finally served, Chennakesava willingly returns to prison to serve his sentence, ordering Bharath to stay behind and take his place as the protector of Rayalaseema. The film ends with Bharath proudly carrying on his father's legacy.

== Cast ==
- Nandamuri Balakrishna in a dual role as
  - Chennakesava Reddy (father)
  - DCP Bharath Reddy (son)
- Tabu as Devi, Chennakesava's wife and Bharath's mother
- Shriya Saran as Preethi, Bharath's love interest
- Jaya Prakash Reddy as Venkat Reddy
- Anand Raj as Dhanunjaya Reddy
- Mohan Raj as Jai Reddy
- Brahmanandam as Seema Sastry
- Ali as Lagaan Khan
- Annapurna as Draupadi, Chennakesava Reddy's mother
- Devayani as Janaki, Chennakesava Reddy's sister
- Pruthvi as Krishna Reddy, Chennakesava Reddy's brother-in-law
- Devan as Judge Ravi Reddy
- L.B. Sriram as Hippi Lahari
- Venu Madhav as Prisoner
- Siva Krishna as S.P. Ramaraju
- Ahuti Prasad as Sivaji Reddy, Seeta's brother
- Chalapathi Rao as Sathi Reddy
- Vizag Prasad as Police Commissioner Prasad
- Raghu Babu as Giri Reddy, Venkat Reddy's son
- Nagineedu as Minister
- Ponnambalam
- M. S. Narayana as Suri Reddy
- Fish Venkat as Venkat

== Soundtrack ==
Chennakesava Reddy

Film score by Mani Sharma
- Released: 28 August 2002
- Genre: Soundtrack
- Length: 30:23
- Label: Supreme Music
- Producer: Mani Sharma

Mani Sharma chronology
Indra (2002)	Chennakesava Reddy (2002)	Bobby (2002)

Music was composed by Mani Sharma. Music was released on Supreme Music Company.

No.	Title	Lyrics	Singer(s)	Length
1.	"Don't Care"	Chandrabose	Shankar Mahadevan	4:39
2.	"Hai Hai"	Veturi	S. P. Balasubrahmanyam, Sunitha	5:29
3.	"Bakara Bakara"	Chandrabose	Udit Narayan, Chitra	5:19
4.	"Nee Koppulona"	Srinivas	S. P. Balasubrahmanyam, Kousalya	5:04
5.	"Em Pilla Kusalama"	Sirivennela Seetharama Sastry	S. P. Balasubrahmanyam, Sujatha	5:12
6.	"Telupu Telupu"	Chandrabose	S. P. Balasubrahmanyam, Chitra	4:39
Total length:				30:23

== Reception ==
The Hindu critic Gudipoodi Srihari in his review appreciated Balakrishna's portrayal of dual roles of father and son, in addition to Sharma's music score. However, he added that: "The father-son clash looks routine and dilutes the spirit of the movie." Sify rated 3/5 and criticised the film stating, "It is the same old Rayalaseema faction fight recreated with more sprinkling of blood and gore."
