= Aarthi Agarwal =

American-Indian actress (1984–2015)

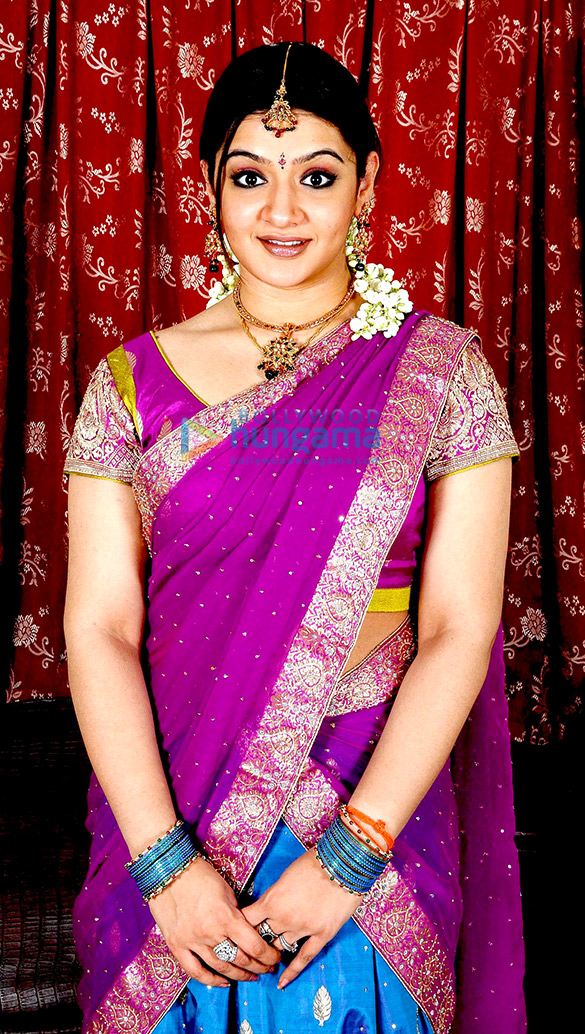
- Born: March 5, 1984; New Jersey, US
- Died: June 6, 2015 (aged 31); Atlantic City, New Jersey, US
- Occupations: Actress, model
- Years active: 2001–2015
- Spouse: Ujjwal Kumar (m. 2007; div. 2009)
- Relatives: Aditi Agarwal (sister)

Aarthi Agarwal (March 5, 1984 – June 6, 2015) was an American, actress of Indian origin who primarily worked in Telugu cinema.

== Early life and career ==
Agarwal was born on March 5, 1984, in New Jersey to Gujarati parents. Her younger sister Aditi Agarwal is also an actress in the Telugu film industry. At around 14 years of age, actor Suniel Shetty spotted her and invited her to dance on stage in Philadelphia, Pennsylvania. After the performance, he asked her father to encourage her to take up acting in Bollywood. At the age of 16 she made her film debut in Paagalpan (2001).

Agarwal made her Telugu film debut in Nuvvu Naaku Nachav (2001) with actor Venkatesh. She was one of the few non-Telugu speaking actresses to work with noted Indian film stars Chiranjeevi, Nandamuri Balakrishna, Nagarjuna, Venkatesh, Rajashekar, Prabhas, Mahesh Babu, Ravi Teja, Srikanth, Jr NTR, Uday Kiran, Tarun, and Venu.

She ventured into Tamil films also, through Winner (2003) and Bambara Kannaley (2005). In Winner, she was initially cast as the female lead. But due to her unavailability in the second shooting schedule, she was eventually replaced by Kiran Rathod, owing to her popularity after the Tamil film Gemini (2002). She took up popular Telugu remakes of Jyothika's blockbuster Tamil films like Dhool (Veede) and Priyamaana Thozhi (Vasantham)

In 2005, media reported that Agarwal had attempted suicide over the failure of a romantic relationship with a co-star. In 2006, following an accident at home, she was hospitalized with internal head injuries at Apollo Hospital, Jubilee Hills, Hyderabad and put on ventilator support.

In 2007, Agarwal married a software engineer; the couple divorced in 2009.

== Death ==
On June 6, 2015, Agarwal was pronounced dead on arrival at AtlantiCare Regional Medical Center in Atlantic City, New Jersey. Agarwal, who had undergone a liposuction surgery six weeks prior, had severe breathing problems before her death. Her manager stated the cause of her death was cardiac arrest. She had been living with her parents in Egg Harbor Township.

== Filmography ==
- All films are in Telugu, unless otherwise noted.

List of films and roles
Year	Film	Role	Notes
2001	Paagalpan	Roma Pinto	Hindi film
2001	Nuvvu Naaku Nachav	Nandini	
2002	Nuvvu Leka Nenu Lenu	Krishna Veni	
2002	Allari Ramudu	Mythili	
2002	Indra	Snehalatha Reddy	
2002	Nee Sneham	Amrutha	
2002	Bobby	Bhagyamathi	
2003	Palanati Brahmanaidu	Sruthi	
2003	Vasantam	Nandini	
2003	Winner	Dancer	Tamil film; special appearance in a song
2003	Veede	Mangathaayaru	
2004	Nenunnanu	Sruthi	
2004	Adavi Ramudu	Madhulatha	
2004	Koduku		Special appearance
2005	Sankranti	Padma	
2005	Soggadu	Swati	
2005	Narasimhudu	Herself	Special appearance
2005	Chatrapathi	Herself	Special appearance
2005	Bambara Kannaley	Pooja	Tamil film
2006	Andala Ramudu	Radha	
2008	Gorintaku	Nandini	
2008	Deepavali	Aarthi	
2009	Posani Gentleman	Neeraja	
2010	Taj Mahal	Maisamma	Special appearance in song
2010	Brahmalokam To Yamalokam Via Bhulokam	Rambha	
TBA	Ranam 2		Reused footage from unreleased film Mudra
2016	Aame Yevaru	Pravallika	Posthumous release
