= Veede =

- Directed by: Ravi Raja Pinisetty
- Written by: Dharani
- Screenplay by: Kona Venkat (dialogue)
- Story by: Dharani
- Based on: Dhool (Tamil)
- Produced by: Singanamala Ramesh Babu
- Starring: Ravi Teja; Arti Agarwal; Reema Sen; Sayaji Shinde
- Cinematography: R. Ramesh Babu
- Edited by: Marthand K. Venkatesh
- Music by: Chakri
- Production company: Kanakaratna Movies
- Distributed by: K S Ramarao films
- Release date: 31 October 2003
- Running time: 180 minutes
- Country: India
- Language: Telugu

Veede (transl. Him) is a 2003 Indian Telugu-language action film directed by Ravi Raja Pinisetty. This film stars Ravi Teja, Arti Agarwal, Reema Sen, and Sayaji Shinde. The film is a remake of Tamil movie Dhool (2003).

== Plot ==
Yedukondalu (Ravi Teja) is an uneducated, head strong youth in Bobbarlanka village. He and his village heads decide to close down the nearby factory by appealing to politicians as its letting out a lot of pollutants into the river which is the main source of food, water and livelihood for them. He and another girl Mangatayaru (Aarti Agarwal) are sent to Hyderabad to appeal to MLA of their constituency - Byragi Naidu (Sayaji Shinde). They stay at a friend's place, (Ali's house) and try to get their work done by the minister. In the process many hurdles come across them. Yedukondalu roughs up a few of the MLA's goons and is always at loggerheads with his henchmen. After all this, Byragi Naidu begins to show his true colors and plans to butcher Edu Kondalu as he is forming as an obstruction to his underground activities, unknowingly. Then, the protagonist of the story decides to teach the MLA a lesson, get his job done of closing down the factory. Swapna (Reema Sen) is a journalist who stays in Yedukondalu's locality and has a heavy crush on him. She also helps him in pinning down the minister. The remaining plot is how intelligently Yedukondalu outclasses the minister and earns good name. Also in the plot, the hero makes use of Shakeela's films to defame the minister and she herself makes an appearance in the film.

== Cast ==
- Ravi Teja as Yedukondalu
- Aarti Agarwal as Mangatayaru "Manga"
- Reema Sen as Swapna
- Sayaji Shinde as MLA Byragi Naidu
- Brahmanandam as Ramakrishna, Yedukondalu and Mangatayaru's friend
- Ali as Sannasi Naidu aka Sunny
- Manoj K. Jayan as Venkateshwara Rao
- Nalini as Swarnakka
- Pasupathy as Swarnakka's younger brother and Byragi Nayudu's henchman
- Shakeela as herself
- MS Narayana as Bhadram, Yedukondalu's friend
- Venu Madhav as Venu, Yedukondalu's friend
- Dharmavarapu Subramanyam as Subramanyam, Byragi Naidu's Friend
- Telangana Shakuntala as Shakuntala, Yedukondalu and Mangatayaru's, grandmother
- Archana
- Raja Ravindra
- Rajitha as Susheela, Byragi Naidu's wife
- Baby Sri Divya

== Production ==
The film's name was suggested by Puri Jagannadh. The film was shot in Mysore, Chikmagalur and Nekkad.

== Soundtrack ==
Veede

Soundtrack album by Chakri
- Released: 2003
- Recorded: 2003
- Genre: Feature film soundtrack

The music is composed by Chakri and released by Supreme. The song "Ammadi Yamma Yammare" was borrowed from the Tamil original. Lyrics by Bhaskarabhatla Ravikumar, Sahiti, and Suddala Ashokteja.

No.	Title	Lyrics	Singer(s)	Length
1.	"Adugadugo Vasthunadu"	Suddhala Ashok Teja	Telangana Shakuntala
2.	"Ammadi Yamma Yammare"	Sahithi	Ravi Verma
3.	"Andamaina Papa Peeru"	Bhaskarbatla	Shankar Mahadevan, Kousalya
4.	"Chanaknanchal"	Sahithi	Udit Narayan, Sunitha
5.	"Edurantu Lene Leni"	Bhaskarbatla	Chakri
6.	"Kinnerasani Vannelarani"	Sahithi	Hariharan, Kousalya	05:01

== Release ==
The Hindu opined that the film is "worth watching". Sify said that " Veede is a one-man show for Ravi Teja". Full Hyderabad gave the film a rating of seven-and-a-half out of ten. Idlebrain gave the film a rating of three-and-a-quarter out of five.
