= Savalyapuram =

Coordinates: 16°07′56″N 79°50′25″E

- village
- Interactive map of Savalyapuram
- Country: India
- State: Andhra Pradesh
- District: Palnadu

Languages
  - Official: Telugu
- Time zone: UTC+5:30 (IST)
- PIN: 522 646
- Telephone code: +91–8646
- Vehicle registration: AP

Savalyapuram is a village in Palnadu district of the Indian state of Andhra Pradesh.
