= Indra (2002 film) =

2002 Telugu film starring Chiranjeevi

- Theatrical release poster
- Directed by: B. Gopal
- Written by: Story: Chinni Krishna; Screenplay & Dialogues: Paruchuri Brothers
- Produced by: C. Aswani Dutt
- Starring: Chiranjeevi; Aarthi Agarwal; Sonali Bendre
- Cinematography: V. S. R. Swamy
- Edited by: Kotagiri Venkateswara Rao
- Music by: Mani Sharma
- Production company: Vyjayanthi Movies
- Release date: 24 July 2002
- Running time: 173 minutes
- Country: India
- Language: Telugu
- Budget: ₹10 crore
- Box office: est. ₹59 crore

Indra is a 2002 Indian Telugu-language action drama film directed by B. Gopal and produced by C. Aswani Dutt under Vyjayanthi Movies banner. The film stars Chiranjeevi in the title role, alongside Aarthi Agarwal, and Sonali Bendre in the lead roles. Mukesh Rishi, Sivaji, and Prakash Raj play the key roles. The music for the film was composed by Mani Sharma.

The film was released on 24 July 2002. Made on a budget of ₹10−13 crore, it grossed over ₹59 crore with a distributor's share of ₹32 crore, becoming the highest-grossing Telugu film at the time, the 2nd highest-grossing South-Indian film, behind Indian and the highest-grossing South Indian film in a single language, becoming the first to surpass ₹50 crore. It was also the second highest-grossing Indian film of 2002, after Devdas.

Indra received positive reviews and won several awards, including three Nandi Awards and two Filmfare Awards South. Chiranjeevi received both the Nandi Award for Best Actor and Filmfare Award for Best Actor – Telugu for his performance. The film was dubbed into Hindi as Indra: The Tiger and was remade in Indian Bengali as Dada (2005) and Bangladeshi Bengali as Goriber Dada (2006).

== Plot ==
In a village in Rayalaseema, two rival clans led by Bharathasimha Reddy and Veera Siva Reddy, are embroiled in a cycle of violence. A police inspector arranges a marriage between Bharathasimha Reddy's brother, Vijayasimha Reddy, and Siva Reddy's sister to broker peace. However, Siva Reddy's sister poisons Vijayasimha Reddy on their wedding night, leading to both their deaths. Following this betrayal, Siva Reddy and his men kill Bharathasimha Reddy. Siva Reddy is arrested and sentenced to 14 years in prison.

With the male leaders of Bharathasimha's family dead, his son, Indrasena "Indra" Reddy, steps up to lead the clan. In a powerful scene, Indra takes a sword and sits on the throne, symbolising his new role as the clan leader, much to the delight of his paternal grandmother and the rest of the clan.

In 2002, Indra is living in Varanasi under the alias Shankar Narayana, a truthful and honest taxi driver. During a singing competition at his niece's college, her friend Pallavi, the daughter of Uttar Pradesh's governor Chenna Kesava Reddy, falls in love with Shankar and pretends to be an orphan to live at his house. When Chenna Kesava Reddy discovers his daughter's whereabouts, he goes to Shankar's home but changes his mind upon recognizing him as Indrasena Reddy. Instead, he requests Shankar to marry Pallavi, but Shankar refuses due to his responsibilities towards his niece, Nandini.

Giri, an orphaned youth who has become Shankar's right-hand man, confesses his love for Nandini, and Shankar arranges their wedding. However, the wedding is disrupted by Snehalatha Reddy, who reveals that Giri is actually Veera Manohar Reddy, the son of Veera Shankar Reddy, Siva Reddy's elder son. She also addresses Shankar as Indrasena Reddy, shocking his adoptive family. After a confrontation, Valmiki, Indra's trusted associate, narrates Indra's past.

Indra, revered in his village, was dedicated to the welfare of the people. After Siva Reddy's release from prison, Indra warned him to stay away, but Siva Reddy instigated violence, leading Indra to kill him. Snehalatha, Siva Reddy's daughter, fell in love with Indra, but Veera Shankar Reddy sought revenge. Indra saved Veera Shankar Reddy's younger son from an accident, but Veera Shankar Reddy killed his own son to maintain his pride.

Indra confronted Veera Shankar Reddy, allowing the boy's mother to mourn before burying him and planting a "Tulasi" sapling over his grave, symbolizing the boy's soul. Indra warned Veera Shankar Reddy to protect the plant or face his wrath. Snehalatha then proposed marriage to Indra, but the village's drought led Indra to negotiate for the construction of a reservoir, which required land from Siva Reddy's family. Veera Shankar Reddy demanded Indra's entire property in return, to which Indra agreed. Snehalatha asked to marry Indra as her share of the land, and he accepted.

However, on their wedding day, Veera Shankar Reddy killed Indra's sisters and their husbands, orphaning Nandini and her brother Pradeep. Enraged, Indra killed Veera Shankar Reddy's three brothers and wounded him. Misled by her family, Snehalatha believed Indra was responsible for the violence and broke off the engagement. Indra then left the village for Varanasi to raise his niece and nephew.

In the present, Nandini attempts suicide after becoming pregnant with Manohar Reddy's child. Indra returns to the village, receiving a hero's welcome. He confronts Veera Shankar Reddy and demands that Manohar Reddy marry Nandini. Snehalatha learns the truth about her brothers' actions and tries to help, but is attacked. Indra saves her and decides to end the cycle of revenge without killing Veera Shankar Reddy. Manohar Reddy marries Nandini, but Indra remains focused on his duty to the people, rejecting marriage proposals from both Snehalatha and Pallavi. The film ends with Indra receiving widespread support from the villagers, solidifying his commitment to ending the violence in Rayalaseema.

== Cast ==
- Chiranjeevi as Indrasena "Indra" Reddy / Shankar Narayana
  - Teja Sajja as young Indrasena Reddy
- Aarthi Agarwal as Snehalatha Reddy
- Sonali Bendre as Pallavi Reddy
- Sivaji as Veera Manohara Reddy / Giri
  - Tanish as young Veera Manohar Reddy
- Kalpana as Indra's elder sister
- Vinaya Prasad as Indra's eldest sister
- Mukesh Rishi as Veera Shankar Reddy
- Delhi rajeswari as Veera Shankar Reddy Wife.
- Prakash Raj as Chenna Kesava Reddy
- Puneet Issar as Shoukath Ali Khan
- Raza Murad as Veera Siva Reddy
- Tanikella Bharani as Valmiki Reddy, Indrasena Reddy's assistant
- Ahuti Prasad as Krishna Reddy, Indrasena Reddy's brother-in-law
- Sunil as Balu Natha, Veera Shankar Reddy's brother-in-law
- Brahmanandam as Pandit
- Sameer as Vijaya Simha Reddy, Indrasena Reddy's uncle
- Dharmavarapu Subramanyam as Pandit's friend
- M. S. Narayana as Gangaram, car driver
- Pavala Syamala as Bamma
- Narra Venkateswara Rao as Superintendent of Police Damodar Reddy
- Allu Ramalingaiah as Subba Rayudu
- AVS as Bacchu Peda Pichayya
- G. V. Sudhakar Naidu as Veera Prathap Reddy
- Raja Ravindra as Veera Bhadra Reddy
- Lahari as Nandini Manohara Natha
- Rajitha
- S. P. Balasubrahmanyam as himself in a cameo appearance
- Rani in cameo appearance
- Sivakrishna as Bharatha Simha Reddy, Indrasena Reddy's father
- Kalpana as Veera Siva Natha's sister
- Telangana Shakuntala as Mrs Reddy; Indrasena's grandmother
- Unknown as Pradeep Reddy;
  - Aanand Vardhan as Indra's nephew (young)
- Unknown as Mamat;
- Yadagiri as Veera Shankar Reddy's henchmen

== Production ==
=== Development ===
Following the successes of Gang Leader (1991) and Gharana Mogudu (1992), Chiranjeevi experienced a period without delivering an industry hit, although he continued to deliver major blockbusters. During this time, fans and industry analysts eagerly awaited his return with a strong mass entertainer. Chiranjeevi, meanwhile, considered taking on a family-oriented story to reconnect with his audience.

Producer Aswani Dutt and director B. Gopal were approached by writer Chinni Krishna with a new story set in Rayalaseema, addressing the region's water crisis as a central theme intertwined with factional conflicts. While the script showed promise, there were concerns about audience reception to another faction-themed film, given B. Gopal's association with such narratives. B. Gopal was also hesitant to direct the project due to his earlier unsuccessful collaboration with Chiranjeevi on Mechanic Alludu (1993). However, writer Paruchuri Gopala Krishna eventually persuaded him to take on the project.

Chinni Krishna was tasked with further developing the story, which initially had the Krishna-Godavari river region as its backdrop. During discussions with Paruchuri Gopala Krishna, the setting was changed to Kasi (Varanasi) and the Ganga river region to expand the narrative's scope.

The film marked Chiranjeevi's third collaboration with Vyjayanthi Movies, following Jagadeka Veerudu Athiloka Sundari (1990) and Choodalani Vundi (1998). After two months of filming, Aswani Dutt suggested the title Indra, which Chiranjeevi approved.

=== Casting ===
Jyothika and Simran were initially considered for the lead female roles, but were replaced by Aarti Agarwal and Sonali Bendre. For the role played by Sivaji, actors such as Venkat and Raja were considered before Sivaji was finalised.

=== Filming ===
The film was completed in 120 working days with a budget of ₹7 crore, excluding Chiranjeevi's remuneration. Sets resembling Varanasi were recreated at Annapurna Studios, while a Rayalaseema village set was constructed at Ramoji Film City. Two duets were filmed in Switzerland. Portions of the film were shot in Varanasi and Lucknow in January 2002.

== Music ==
Indra

Soundtrack album by Mani Sharma
- Released: 2002
- Recorded: 2002
- Genre: Feature film soundtrack
- Length: 31:52
- Language: Telugu
- Label: Aditya Music
- Producer: Mani Sharma

Mani Sharma chronology
| Youth (2002) | Indra (2002) | Chennakesava Reddy (2002) |

The soundtrack of Indra was composed by Mani Sharma, with the song "Ayyo Ayyo Ayyayyo" composed by R. P. Patnaik due to Mani Sharma's unavailability. The album featured six songs, chosen from 11 recorded tracks.

The audio was released on the evening of 14 June 2002 at a set in the first floor of Annapurna Studios. The audio album of Indra was released 45 days before the film's theatrical release, instead of the usual 20–30 days, to ensure the music had more time to resonate with the audience.

Gemini TV covered this event and it was telecast as a 30-minute capsule on Gemini TV. Chiranjeevi selected a coupon from the lucky dip box and called the lucky fan to the stage. Chiranjeevi opened the audio box and handed over the first cassette to that fan. The audio hit the market on 17 June 2002.

Tracklist (Telugu)
| No. | Title | Lyrics | Singer(s) | Length |
|---|---|---|---|---|
| 1. | "Bham Bham Bole" | Sirivennela Sitaramasastri | Hariharan, Shankar Mahadevan | 6:08 |
| 2. | "Ammadu Appachi" | Veturi | S. P. Balasubrahmanyam & Kalpana | 4:44 |
| 3. | "Radhe Govinda" | Bhuvanachandra | K. S. Chithra, Udit Narayan | 4:50 |
| 4. | "Ghallu Ghallu" | Sirivennela Sitaramasastri | S. P. Balasubrahmanyam, Mallikarjun | 5:52 |
| 5. | "Dayi Dayi Damma" | Sirivennela Sitaramasastri | KK & Mahalakshmi Iyer | 5:20 |
| 6. | "Ayyo Ayyo Ayyayyo" (Composed by R. P. Patnaik) | Kulasekhar | Karthik & Usha | 4:58 |
| Total length: | | | | 31:52 |

Tracklist (Tamil)
| No. | Title | Lyrics | Singer(s) | Length |
|---|---|---|---|---|
| 1. | "Bom Bom Osai" | Muthulingam | Tippu | 6:08 |
| 2. | "Alva Thundu Penne" | Snehan | Tippu, Anuradha Sriram | 4:44 |
| 3. | "Radhe Gopala" | Ponniyin Selvan | Unnikrishnan, Sujatha | 4:50 |
| 4. | "Jhallu Jhallu" | Muthulingam | Ramu | 5:52 |
| 5. | "Aadi Aadi Vamma" | Ponniyin Selvan | Yugendran, Sri Vardhini | 5:20 |
| 6. | "Ayayaya" (Composed by R. P. Patnaik) | Snehan | Karthik, Shalini | 4:58 |
| Total length: | | | | 31:52 |

All lyrics are written by Dev Kohli.

Tracklist (Hindi)
| No. | Title | Singer(s) | Length |
|---|---|---|---|
| 1. | "Bam Bam Bole" | Tippu | 6:08 |
| 2. | "Main Tera Deewana" | | 4:44 |
| 3. | "Radhe Govinda Tu Mera Chanda" | Udit Narayan, Sadhana Sargam | 4:50 |
| 4. | "Jhoom Jhoom Ke Payal" | Suresh Wadkar | 5:52 |
| 5. | "Yeh Haseena Chehra" | Hariharan, Sadhana Sargam | 5:20 |
| 6. | "Kaisi Hai Barfili Thandi Yeh Hawa" (Composed by R. P. Patnaik) | | 4:58 |
| Total length: | | | 31:52 |

== Release ==
Indra was released on 24 July 2002, on 268 screens, including 223 in Andhra Pradesh, 30 in Karnataka, three in Orissa, and 15 in the United States.

The release generated significant excitement, with long queues forming from midnight on 23 July and large crowds gathering at theatres across the state. Reports of black ticket sales emerged in several locations, including complaints about police involvement in black marketing, particularly in Guntur.

On 23 July, the film's storywriter, Chinni Krishna, celebrated the release in his hometown, Tenali, by arranging a special premiere show at 9 pm. Fans from neighboring Karnataka cities, such as Kolar and Chikkaballapur, travelled to Madanapalle to watch the film on its release day.

Several incidents occurred during the film's release, including die-hard Chiranjeevi fans storming a theatre in Ballari for an early screening. Additionally, a fan attempted suicide over ticket issues but was stopped by other fans.

In September 2002, Indra faced widespread piracy as 70,000 pirated CDs originating from Bangalore flooded markets across Andhra Pradesh after the film crossed its 50-day mark, causing a significant drop in collections in areas like Ballari.

== Reception ==
=== Box office ===
Upon release, Indra became a major commercial success, setting several box office records for its opening day, week, and lifetime collections.

Indra grossed over ₹55−59 crore against a budget of ₹10 crore, making it the highest-grossing Telugu film at the time of its release. The film set a record by earning a distributor share of ₹32 crore.

It was the first Telugu film to gross over ₹50 crore, a record later surpassed by Pokiri (2006). It became the highest grossing Telugu film ever as well as the all-time highest-grossing South-Indian film in a single language, surpassing Padayappa (1999). It was the second highest-grossing Indian film of 2002, following Devdas.

Indra had a 50-day run in 152 centres, including nine in Karnataka and two in Orissa, and a 100-day run in 122 centres, with four in Karnataka and one in Orissa. The film also had a 175-day run in 32 centres, including a 247-day run at Satyam Theatre in Adoni.

The 175-day celebration event was held in Vijayawada, with Chief Minister N. Chandrababu Naidu as the chief guest.

=== Critical response ===
Jeevi of Idlebrain.com gave a rating of 4 1/2 out of 5 stating, "First half is a perfect blend of mass and class elements. It's extraordinary. The interval scene gives the right finishing touch to the first half." A critic from Sify wrote, "On the whole the film is refreshing and a good entertainer with Chiru at his best".

== Legacy ==
Indra is one of the biggest hits in Chiranjeevi's film career.

The film had an excellent run on Hindi television channels through the dubbed version Indra: The Tiger. Saudamini Jain of Hindustan Times wrote in 2015, "For a decade now, the Telugu blockbuster Indra dubbed in Hindi as Indra The Tiger seems to have become a permanent fixture on TV". TV and film writer Mushtaq Sheikh said of the film, "When I was heading Sahara One (in 2010-11) we had these perpetual, evergreen films: whenever you needed ratings, you could close your eyes and screen them. Indra was one of them." CEO of Applause Entertainment Sameer Nair noted, “We used to play Indra: The Tiger and our ratings were sorted for two weeks." Diptakirti Chaudhuri, in his book Bioscope: A Frivolous History of Bollywood in Ten Chapters, listed Indra as one of the most-watched dubbed films on Indian television.

== Awards ==
| Year | Award | Category | Nominee | Result | Ref. |
|---|---|---|---|---|---|
| 2002 | Filmfare Awards | Best Actor – Telugu | Chiranjeevi | Won | |
| 2002 | Filmfare Awards | Best Choreography | Raghava Lawrence | Won | |
| 2002 | Nandi Awards | Best Actor | Chiranjeevi | Won | |
| 2002 | Nandi Awards | Best Choreographer | Raghava Lawrence | Won | |
| 2002 | Nandi Awards | Best Male Dubbing Artist | P. Ravi Shankar | Won | |
| 2002 | CineMAA Awards | Best Actor – Telugu | Chiranjeevi | Won | |
| 2002 | CineMAA Awards | Best Actress – Telugu | Aarthi Agarwal | Won | |
