= Nandi Awards of 1983 =

Indian Telugu film and TV awards ceremony

Nandi Awards presented annually by Government of Andhra Pradesh. First awarded in 1964.

== 1983 Nandi Awards Winners List ==
Category	Winner	Film
Best Feature Film	Jandhyala	Ananda Bhairavi
Second Best Feature Film	T. Krishna	Neti Bharatam
Third Best Feature Film	K. Viswanath	Sagara Sangamam

- Best Screen Writers : Palagummi padmaraju, R.K.Dharmaraju (Bahudoorapu Batasari)
- Second best screenwriter : K.S.Chandramurty (Ananda Bhairavi
- Best actor : Kamal Haasan
- Best Support actor: P.L.Narayana
- Best Actress: Jayasudha
- Best Support Actress: K.Shakunthala
- Best Child Actor: Master Hari
- Best Cinematographer : S. Gopal Reddy
- Best Screen Play: T.Krishna
- Best Dialogue Writer: Dasari Narayana Rao
- Best Songs Writer: Sri Sri
- Best Editor: G.G.Krishnarao
- Best Male Playback singer : S.P.Balasubrahmanyam
- Best Female playback singer : S.Janaki
- Best Music director: Jandhyala
- Best art director: Thota tharani
- Best Film for National Integration : Vimukthi Kosam
- First Best Documentary Film: Pembarthi Loha Kala
- Second best documentary film: Swaram mee chethilo undi
- Third best documentary film: andaram okkate
