= Thiladaanam =

Thilaadanam
- Directed by: K. N. T. Sastry
- Written by: Rentala Nageswara Rao (dialogues)
- Screenplay by: K. N. T. Sastry
- Story by: Rentala Nageswara Rao
- Produced by: P. Parameswaran
- Starring: H. G. Dattatreya; Brahmaji; Tanikella Bharani; Jaya Seal
- Cinematography: Sunny Joseph
- Edited by: A. Sreekar Prasad
- Music by: L. Vaidyanathan
- Production company: National Film Development Corporation
- Release date: 2000
- Running time: 1 hr 29 min
- Country: India
- Language: Telugu

Thiladaanam (English title: The Rite... A Passion) is a 2000 Indian Telugu-language drama film, written and directed by film-critic K. N. T. Sastry in his debut directorial, based on a story by Rentala Nageswara Rao. The film features H. G. Dattatreya, Brahmaji, Tanikella Bharani, and Jaya Seal in pivotal roles.

Upon release, the film received positive reviews and won the Best First Film of a Director award at the 49th National Film Awards. The citation praised the film "for its juxtaposition of two diverse ideologies existing within the same family—the father's belief in his religion and traditions and his son's revolutionary ideology. The film strikes a very fine balance in inter-generational explorations." Thiladaanam is the only Indian film to be honoured with the New Currents Award at the 7th Busan International Film Festival. It was also featured in the Indian Panorama section at the 33rd International Film Festival of India, and in a Retrospective at the New York Indian Film Festival.

== Plot ==
Subbayya is an outcast Brahmin priest living in Hyderabad, who survives by performing tiladaanam (a Hindu ritual of giving sesame seeds as alms, which transfers the giver's sins to the receiver), the meanest form of Brahmin duty. He ekes out a living as a corpse-carrier, moving from funeral to funeral, studying and practicing the tradition of washing away the sins of the deceased. He is a staunch follower of traditional values and is content with his social position. In contrast, his son, Raghuram, is a Naxalite and is willing to resort to violence to bring about societal change. This ideological conflict creates tension between father and son, with greater dangers looming ahead for the family.

Raghuram makes a clandestine visit home during the birth of his child, but in search of him, the anti-Naxalite team ransacks Subbayya's house. Although Raghuram escapes the police firing, killing a cop in the process, he eventually surrenders to the authorities, hoping that his family will receive government compensation. Shocked by his son's surrender, Subbayya dies from the trauma, leaving his daughter-in-law, Padma, waiting in vain for the promised compensation.

== Cast ==
- H. G. Dattatreya as Subbayya
- Brahmaji as a naxal
- Tanikella Bharani
- A. V. S.
- Annapoorna
- Jaya Seal
- Prasad Babu
- Athili Lakshmi

== Awards ==
International Honours

- New Currents Award at the 7th Busan International Film Festival
- Indian Panorama section at the 33rd International Film Festival of India
- Retrospective New York Indian Film Festival
- One-of-a-kind Indo-German Film Festival

National Film Awards

- Best Debut Film of a Director - K. N. T. Sastry

Nandi Awards

- Best First Film of a Director - K. N. T. Sastry
- Best Makeup Artist - Shyam Jadcharla
