= Nandi Awards of 1986 =

Indian Telugu film and TV awards ceremony

Nandi Awards presented annually by Government of Andhra Pradesh. First awarded in 1964.

== 1986 Nandi Awards Winners List ==
Category	Winner	Film
Best Feature Film	K. Viswanath	Swathi Muthyam
Second Best Feature Film	T. Krishna	Repati Pourulu
Third Best Feature Film	Muthyala Subbaiah	Aruna Kiranam
