= Haqeeqat (1985 film) =

- Theatrical release poster
- Directed by: T. Rama Rao
- Written by: Dr. Rahi Masoom Reza (dialogues)
- Screenplay by: T. Rama Rao
- Story by: T. Krishna
- Based on: Neti Bharatam (1983)
- Produced by: Vijay Soorma; Rajeev Kumar
- Starring: Jeetendra; Jaya Prada
- Cinematography: B. S. Loknath
- Edited by: Swamy; Balu
- Music by: Bappi Lahiri
- Production company: Vidya Shree Films
- Release date: 6 April 1985
- Running time: 138 minutes
- Country: India
- Language: Hindi

Haqeeqat (transl. Reality) is a 1985 Hindi-language political action film, produced by Vijay Soorma and Rajeev Kumar under the Vidya Shree Films banner and directed by T. Rama Rao. It stars Jeetendra, Jaya Prada in the pivotal roles and music composed by Bappi Lahiri. The film is remake of the Telugu movie నేటి Bharatam (1983), starring Suman, Vijayashanti in the pivotal roles.

== Cast ==
- Jeetendra as Inspector Arjun
- Jaya Prada as Bharti
- Raj Babbar as Amar
- Swapna as Kusum
- Bindu as Laxmi
- Prem Chopra as Ajgar Pandey
- Sujit Kumar as SP Surajpal Singh
- Om Shivpuri as Dr. Mathur
- Bharat Kapoor as Ajgar's Advocate
- Asrani as Constable Mahipal Singh
- Nilu Phule as Kusum's Father
- Dulari as Amar's Mother
- Beena Banerjee as Sharda
- Chandrashekhar as Police Inspector
- Pinchoo Kapoor as Employment Exchange Officer
- Viju Khote as Hospital Ward Boy, Guest Role

== Soundtrack ==
Lyrics: Indeevar

Song	Singer
"Tune Pilaya Hai"	Kishore Kumar
"Suswagatam"	Lata Mangeshkar
"Main Bharatmata"	Asha Bhosle, Shabbir Kumar
"Ghan Ghan"	Shabbir Kumar
"Chalo Chalo Chachi, Jayenge Dawakhane"	Usha Mangeshkar, Anwar, Chandrani Mukherjee, Nitin Mukesh
"Suno Suno"	S. Janaki
