= Rukhsana Kausar =

Indian activist

Rukhsana Kausar KC
- Born: 1989 (age 36–37)
- Citizenship: Indian
- Known for: Killed a LeT terrorist and injured another at her residence in Rajouri district.
- Spouse: Kaber Husain
- Parent(s): Noor Hussain (Father), Rashida Begum (Mother)
- Relatives: Aijaz (Brother), Waqalat Hussain (Uncle), Kulzum Pari (Aunt)
- Awards: Kirti Chakra; Announced National Bravery Award, Cash award of 5Lakhs by J&K government. Cash award of Rs 10 lakh by All India Anti-Terrorist Front (AIATF) Chairman M S Bitta.

Rukhsana Kausar KC (born 1989) is a Gujjar woman from Upper Kalsi known for the 2009 shooting of a LeT terrorist at her home, in Nowshera, Rajouri district of Jammu and Kashmir (J&K), India. She was born to Noor Hussain and Rashida Begum. A Class 10 dropout, she has been awarded the India National Bravery Award, for the killing of a Laskar-E-Taiba terror cell leader, Abu Osama, at her residence, using an axe and AK47 rifle. She has a younger brother, Aijaz, who helped her chase the other terrorists involved in the home invasion and contact the police afterward.

She and her brother have received several major awards for their actions.

== Militant Incident ==
On a Sunday night at around 9:30 pm, 27 September 2009, three militants came to the house of Waqalat Hussain, Rukhsana's uncle. They had forced him to lead them to his elder brother Noor Hussain's adjoining house. When Noor Hussain did not open the door, the three allegedly broke open a window and entered the house. By then, he with his wife, Rashida Begum, had hidden Rukhsana beneath a cot. They demanded Rukhsana be handed over to them. When her parents and younger brother Aijaz tried to resist, the militants started hitting them with rifle butts. Rukhsana emerged from her hiding place with an axe and hit the LeT commander on his head. One of the militants opened fire, injuring Waqalat Hussain in his arm. Other family members joined Rukhsana in attacking the militants. Rukhsana picked up the commander's AK47 rifle, retrieved another from the other militant, and threw it to her brother. Rukhsana shot the commander, killing him, and she and her brother fired on the other militants, forcing them to flee. Rukshana and her brother then led their family to the Shahdra Shareif police post and handed over the weapons. En route, to ensure that the militants stayed away, her brother fired in the air at regular intervals until they reached the police post.

The militant was later identified as Abu Osama, a commander of Laskar-E-Taiba. According to Rukhsana's mother, he had earlier threatened Rukhsana to beware.

== Critical location ==
Main articles: Rajouri and Rajouri district.

Shahdra Sharief in Rajouri district, the place where Rukhsana's house is located, is 20 miles (32 km) away from the cease-fire line between the Indian and Pakistani forces. It is close to dense forests known to be a hiding place of the LeT militant group that is believed to have carried out the 2008 Mumbai attacks.

== Aftermath ==
After her shooting incident, Rukhsana Kausar stated:

"I don't want a job in Jammu, but in Delhi. The Centre has to give me a job in the capital ...we will be safer there. It's not that I want to leave my house at Rajouri district in J&K, but after that incident, I am sure the terrorists will target me and my family." –Rukhsana to reporters

To ensure the family's protection, a special police post had been set up at Noor Hussain's house. Rukhsana and Aijaz were also offered jobs as Special Police Officers. The offer was reportedly declined owing to the possibility of violent reprisal in J&K. Instead Rukhsana stated she wanted the center to protect her family and move them to Delhi.

=== Revenge attack ===
On 31 October 2009, unidentified gunmen threw two hand grenades and fired several rounds at Rukhsana's house at around 10:30 pm. The grenades, however, missed and exploded away from her house. Later, the militants again fired from a hilltop, retreating soon afterwards as night fell. As no family members were present at the time, there were no casualties. They had already been moved to a high-security police colony on 7 October 2009, where a government quarter has been allotted to them.

On Tuesday night, 10 November 2009, following a tip-off, the security forces recovered an improvised explosive device (IED) near Rukhsana's house. It was later defused by a bomb disposal squad.

== 2013 ==
By 2013, Rukhsana had taken a position as constable in her home town. She had two daughters. She still sought security from the government for her family. She had been awarded the following awards:

- National Bravery Award
- Sarvottam Jeevan Raksha Padak
- Sardar Patel Award
- Rani Jhansi Bravery Award
- Astha Award among others

== Abducted earlier ==
On 24 July 2009, Rukhsana and her aunt Kulzum Pari were reportedly abducted by local youth Aijaz Sameer and his accomplices. A medical report, however, confirmed that she had not been raped. Rukhsana alleged that the police tried to cover up her abduction and even offered her money to say before the magistrate that she was not abducted. The police closed the case after getting her statement recorded before a judicial magistrate. Rajour SSP Shafqat Watalli also admitted that the girl was indeed abducted. He said that the local police by no means could close the case, and even if it was closed, it will be reopened. He also reportedly said that there might be a link between her abduction and the militants' home invasion.

== Reactions ==
Rukhsana, who had never picked up a rifle before that incident, has been the talk of the town. Maulana Amir Mohammad Shamsi, head preacher of Alhuda Jamia Masjid, Rajouri congratulated her saying that it was jihad. Shahdra Sharief shrine administrator Inayat Hussain Baba said Rukhsana had set an example for others to emulate.

On Tuesday, 29 September 2009, Governor of J&K Narinder Nath Vohra said that he wanted to recommend Rukhsana for a gallantry award. The Governor also intended to invite her to be honoured at the Raj Bhavan.

President Pratibha Patil, Prime Minister Manmohan Singh and home minister P. Chidambaram, during their visit to J&K, praised Rukhsana for her act.

== Visiting Nariman House ==
On Thursday, 26 November 2009, Rukhsana visited the Nariman House and paid homage to those killed at the Jewish centre during the 26/11 terror attacks. She paid homage by lighting a candle in the prayer hall of the Nariman House.

== In popular culture ==
In 2010, Indian Film Director Geetha Krishna dedicated his film Koffi Bar to Rukhsana, hailing her as one of the bravest women India has seen lately.

== Felicitations ==
On Wednesday, 18 November 2009, the All India Anti-Terrorist Front (AIATF) chairman M S Bitta, at a function organised at the Town Hall on Ashram Road, conferred the Sardar Patel Award on Rukhsana and her brother Aijaz Ahmed for their courageous act. He also presented a cash award of Rs. 1 lakh to both as appreciation of their bravery.

Certain organisations of the Nahan town in Himachal Pradesh are planning to honour Rukhsana on 28 December 2009. Rukhsana will be accompanied by her parents and AIATF chief Manjinder Singh Bitta. It will be her first tour to this hilly state. Ashutosh Gupta, the chairman of the Aastha welfare Society said that Rukhsana would be given a cash award of rupees one lakhs. After the Nahan, Rukhsana would also be honored in the state capital on 29 December 2009.

== Awards ==
- The J&K government has given her a cash award of Rs 5000.
- On 7 October 2009, the center announced National Bravery Award for Rukhsana.
- On 4 November 2009, she was given the Rani Jhanshi bravery award during a felicitation function held at Durgapura in Jaipur.
- She may also receive a £4,000 reward if, as police believe, the dead terrorist is confirmed as Uzafa Shah, a wanted Pakistani LeT commander who had been active in the area for the past four years.
- Sardar Patel Award and Cash award of Rs 1 lakh by AIATF, Gujarat chapter.
- Cash award of Rs 1 lakh by Aastha Welfare Society, Nahan.
- On Friday 8 January 2010, the President of India announced the Sarvottam Jeevan Raksha Padak for Rukhsana.
- On the eve of Republic Day, on Monday, 25 January 2010, Rukhsana and her brother, Aijaz, were awarded the Kirti Chakra, the second highest gallantry award in peacetime, for their bravery act.

== See also ==
- Terrorism in Kashmir
- Terrorism in Jammu and Kashmir
