= Puthiya Theerpu =

1985 film directed by C. V. Rajendran

- Title card
- Directed by: C. V. Rajendran
- Screenplay by: Panchu Arunachalam
- Story by: T. Krishna
- Based on: Neti Bharatam (Telugu)(1983)
- Produced by: Chitra Lakshmanan; Chitra Ramu
- Starring: Vijayakanth; Ambika
- Cinematography: V. Prabhakar
- Edited by: Ramesh Reddy; D. Arasu
- Music by: Ilaiyaraaja
- Production company: Rom Arts
- Release date: 4 October 1985
- Running time: 104 minutes
- Country: India
- Language: Tamil

Puthiya Theerpu (transl. New Judgement) is a 1985 Indian Tamil-language action drama film, directed by C. V. Rajendran, and produced by Chitra Lakshmanan and Chitra Ramu. The film stars Vijayakanth and Ambika. It is a remake of the 1983 Telugu film Neti Bharatam. The film was released on 4 October 1985.

== Cast ==
- Vijayakanth as Inspector Raja
- Ambika as Radha
- M. N. Nambiar as Namachivayam
- Cho Ramaswamy
- Janagaraj as Constable
- Srikanth as Doctor
- Suryakanth
- V. Gopalakrishnan as Lawyer
- Rajasekhar as Bhaskar
- Chitra Lakshmanan
- Rajyalakshmi as Kasthuri
- Gandhimathi

== Soundtrack ==
Soundtrack was composed by Ilaiyaraaja.

| Song | Singers | Lyrics |
|---|---|---|
| Ethanai Ethanai Theerpu | K. S. Chithra, Malaysia Vasudevan | Vairamuthu |
| Raajamanam Sengkarumbu | K. S. Chithra, Malaysia Vasudevan | M. G. Vallabhan |
| Veeran Thaan | P. Susheela | Muthulingam |
| Vetri Murase | Malaysia Vasudevan | Vairamuthu |
