= Koffi Bar =

2011 Indian film by Geetha Krishna

Koffi Bar Nimidangal
- Official poster of Telugu version
- Directed by: Geetha Krishna
- Written by: Geetha Krishna
- Produced by: Geetha Krishna
- Starring: Shashank; Bianca Desai
- Cinematography: Murali; M. V. Raghu
- Music by: Geetha Krishna
- Production company: Blue Fox Cinema
- Distributed by: Lakshmi Ganapathi Films
- Release dates: April 29, 2011 (Telugu); January 4, 2013 (Tamil)
- Country: India
- Languages: Telugu; Tamil

Koffi Bar (Note: Made up alternate spelling of Coffee Bar.) in Telugu and Nimidangal (transl. Minutes) in Tamil, is a 2011 Indian thriller film directed by Geetha Krishna. The film stars Shashank and Bianca Desai with Atul Kulkarni and Suman in supporting roles.

== Cast ==
- Shashank as Ramakrishna
- Bianca Desai as Srijana
- Atul Kulkarni as a rich businessman
- Suman as a CBI officer
- Girish Karnad
- Baby Shivani
- Moushmi in an item number in "Jeena Marnahae"

== Production ==
The film was planned to be shot in Telugu, Kannada (both titled as Koffi Shop) and Tamil (as Nimidangal) and began production in 2009. Biana Desai, known for glamorous roles, played a role without makeup for the film. Newcomer Murali from New York was brought to cinematograph the film along with M. V. Raghu. The film was shot in Hyderabad, Bangalore, and Chennai. The film's plot begins in a coffee shop. Hindi actress Moushmi did an item number in the film. The film was shot for only three days in Bangalore. As a result, the Kannada version stopped production midway after the Karnataka Film Chamber Of Commerce found out that the film was dubbed from Telugu and that more than fifty percent of the film was not shot in Karnataka.

== Soundtrack ==
The director turned the music director for the first time. Lyrics by Vanamali who previously collaborated with Krishna for the Telugu dub of Time (1999).

== Release and reception ==
The film was scheduled to release on 4 March and later 11 March 2011. It was dedicated to Rukhsana Kausar.

Y. Sunitha Chowdhury of The Hindu opined that "Despite Geeta Krishna's dramatic flabbiness, the film has its moments". Deepa Garimella of Full Hyderabad wrote that "This is a film begging to be ignored. Pay attention".

== Home media ==
Sun TV bought the broadcasting rights for both the Telugu and Tamil versions.
