= Nandi Awards of 1982 =

Indian Telugu film and TV awards ceremony

Nandi Awards presented annually by Government of Andhra Pradesh. First awarded in 1964.

== 1982 Nandi Awards Winners List ==
Category	Winner	Film
Best Feature Film	Dasari Narayana Rao	Meghasandesam
Second Best Feature Film	Vejella Satyanarayana	Maro Malupu
Third Best Feature Film	U.Visweswara Rao	Keerthi Kantha Kanakam
