= Kokila (1990 film) =

1990 Indian Telugu-language film

- Directed by: Geetha Krishna
- Screenplay by: Geetha Krishna
- Story by: Geetha Krishna
- Dialogues by: L. B. Sriram
- Produced by: G. Maheswara Rao
- Starring: Naresh; Shobhana; Sarath Babu
- Cinematography: Saroj Padhy
- Edited by: Anil Malnad
- Music by: Ilaiyaraaja
- Production company: Kalyani Enterprises
- Distributed by: Kalyani Enterprises
- Release date: 27 April 1990
- Running time: 133 minutes
- Country: India
- Language: Telugu

Kokila (transl. The Nightingale) is a 1990 Indian Telugu language mystery thriller film written and directed by Geetha Krishna and produced by G. Maheswara Rao under the banner Kalyani Enterprises. The film stars Naresh, Shobhana and Sarath Babu in the lead roles, with music composed by Ilaiyaraaja. Cinematography was handled by Saroj Padhy, while editing was done by Anil Malnad.

Released on 27 April 1990 to positive reviews, Kokila revolves around the theme of paranormal activities after corneal transplantation and blends emotional drama with suspense elements. The film is notable for marking the debut of L. B. Sriram as a dialogue writer, who later went on to establish himself as a prominent writer and actor in Telugu cinema.

== Plot ==
Siddhartha (Naresh), a cheerful stand up comedian, falls in love with Kokila (Shobhana), a popular television singer. The couple marry and live happily along with Shyam, a young boy who stays with them. Their life is disrupted when Siddhartha meets with an accident and loses his eyesight.

Kokila approaches ophthalmologist Dr. Murali Mohan Rao (Ranganath), who informs her that an eye transplant is possible only through a legally donated pair of eyes and involves a high cost. Kokila later returns with the money, and Siddhartha undergoes the transplant. After the surgery, Siddhartha begins experiencing terrifying visions of a corridor and a gun aimed at him, leading to severe panic attacks. Psychiatrist Dr. Rao (C. S. Rao) is consulted, and the doctors are astonished by the possibility that the donor’s last visual memories are being retained through the transplanted eyes.

The donor is identified as Bhagawan Hrishikesh Swamiji (Ram Dev), a respected godman who was recently murdered. The case is investigated by ASP Shakti (Sivakrishna), who suspects that Siddhartha’s visions may hold clues. Conflicts arise between the police and doctors over Siddhartha’s safety and ethics.

Due to the complexity of the case, CBI officer Eeshwar (Sarath Babu) is brought in. Soon after his arrival, Eeshwar survives an assassination attempt. He places Siddhartha and Kokila under police protection in a safe house. Despite this, Kokila receives threatening calls demanding the removal of Siddhartha’s eyes. She also receives a mysterious parcel containing photographs, which she secretly hides.

Eeshwar and Shakti take Siddhartha to Hrishikesh Swamiji’s ashram and briefly remove his blindfold, triggering another panic episode. During a later ambush, Siddhartha is abducted but saved when Hrishikesh Swamiji’s pet dog attacks the assailants, leading Eeshwar to believe the dog recognizes Siddhartha because of the transplanted eyes.

The group travels to a hill station for Siddhartha’s recovery under naturopathic doctor Dr. Rishi (J. V. Ramana Murthi). During a sniper attack, Siddhartha regains his eyesight but keeps it secret on Eeshwar’s advice. Journalist Shilpa (Geetha), who is also Eeshwar’s lover, helps uncover an attempt to poison the group.

When Siddhartha intercepts a threatening phone call meant for Kokila, he mistakenly suspects her of infidelity. Confronted by Siddhartha and Eeshwar, Kokila confesses that she killed Hrishikesh Swamiji under coercion. She reveals that Anantha Swami (Nassar), a disciple of the Swamiji whose real identity is criminal Saeed Iqbal, blackmailed her by promising the donor’s eyes and threatening her life. Photographs confirm her presence at the crime scene.

Saeed Iqbal is arrested, but during interrogation he exposes a larger conspiracy involving Central Minister Phanibhushan Rao (Kota Srinivasa Rao) and Dr. Murali Mohan Rao, who are running an illegal organ trafficking and money laundering racket. Saeed reveals that he himself shot the Swamiji, while Kokila fainted after firing blindly. Saeed later escapes custody but is killed by his accomplices, who also murder ASP Shakti.

Siddhartha and Shyam are kidnapped, and Shyam is killed. Eeshwar confronts the criminals but is temporarily presumed dead. The case reaches court, where Kokila reveals the entire conspiracy. Overcome with guilt and rage, she shoots and kills Phanibhushan Rao and Dr. Murali Mohan Rao inside the courtroom. Eeshwar and Siddhartha arrive too late to stop her, and Kokila is arrested, bringing the case to an end.

== Cast ==
- Shobhana as Kokila
- Sarath Babu as CBI officer Eshwar
- Naresh as Siddhartha
- Geetha as Shilpa
- Ranganath as Dr. Murali Mohan Rao, Opthalmologist
- C. S. Rao as Dr. Rao, Psychiatrist
- Sivakrishna as ASP Shakti
- Kota Srinivasa Rao as Central Minister Phanibhushan Rao
- J. V. Ramana Murthi as Dr. Rishi, Naturopathic Doctor
- Nassar as Anantha Swami / Saeed Iqbal
- Jeeva as Phanibhushan Rao's henchman
- Mallikarjuna Rao as Jagdish, Eshwar's assistant
- Ram Dev as Rishikesha Swamiji
- Pavan Kumar
- Vidyasagar
- Viswanath Kasi
- Telephone Satyanarayana
- Bismeswara Rao
- Bhaskara Babu
- Ashok Kumar
- Dubbing Janaki
- Anitha
- Kalpana Rai
- Master Rajesh
- Baby Meenakshi
- Baby Swarnalatha
- Mahesh
- Babu Rao
- Seshagiri Rao
- Paleswara Rao
- Pattabhi
- Buchi Ramayyachoudary
- Dham
- Anantha Ram
- Nadeem
- Anakapalli Naidu
- Ramakrishna Panthulu

== Soundtrack ==
All lyrics are written by Veturi; all music is composed by Ilaiyaraaja.

No.	Title	Singer(s)	Length
1.	"Navodayam"	Chitra	4:40
2.	"Aakasum Meghalu"	Chitra	4:45
3.	"Thalluku"	Mano, Chitra	4:40
4.	"Ko Ko Kokila"	S. P. Balasubrahmanyam, Chitra	5:47
5.	"Changu Chakka"	S. P. Sailaja	4:42
