= Nandi Award for Best Documentary Film =

Indian film award

The Nandi Award for First Best Documentary Film was commissioned since 1968. This is a list of the films that have won the award over the years.

Year	Film	Producer
2013	Bharatha Keerthi Murthulu	N Gopala Krishna
2011	Avayava Daanam	-
2010	Advaitham	-
2009	Kartavyam	-
2007	Kalisundam Raa	Produced by Commissioner of Social Welfare Department
2005	Chance	Sunil Kumar Reddy
2004	Papam Psivallu'	Reddi Seetharama Rao
2001	Janani	Kodela
2000	Hyderabad Punarnirmanam	C. Rajamouli Gupta
1999	Surabhi	K. N. T. Sastry
1997	Margadarsi	T. Lakshmipathi
1996	Seethakka Salahalu	T. Lakshmipathi
1994	Akshara Vijayam	T. Lakshmipathi
1987	Nava Janardhanam
1986	Easwarudu Itchina Varam
1985	Asthaminchani Suryudu	K. Bhujanga Rao
1984	Ramappa Temple	Krishna Rao Kesav
1983	Pembarthi Lohakala	K. V. R. Reddy
1981	Puttadi Bomma Poornamma	T. Krishna
1969	Srisailam	B. R. Sathyan
1968	Pragathi Padhamlo Bhagyanagaram	Produced by Hyderabad Municipal Corporation

Nandi Award for the Second Best Documentary Film

Year	Film	Producer
2013	Saptha Vyasanalu	-
2011	Mana Badhyatha	-
2010	Freedom Park	-
2009	O Jogini Atmakatha	-
2008	Memu Manushulame	Produced by Commissioner of Social Wlfare Department
2007	Pragathi Patham	A. Durga Mahalakshmi
2005	Kamadhenuvu	N. Gopala Krishna
2004	Kondapalli Vaibhavam	T. Lakshmipathi
2001	Neeru Meeru	T. Lakshmipathi
2000	Rakshakudu	T. Lakshmipathi
1999	Ammakaniko Amma
1997	Pasipillala poshaka Aaharam	C. Narasimha reddy
1996	Bamma maata	P. Rambabu
1991	Aakruthi	Little India films
1988	Maa Ooru
1987	The City
1984	Kaadhantara; Ee Charitra Cheripeddham	Tangella Prabhakar; P. S. Darshan
1983	Swaram Mee Chetilo Vundhi	C. Sreedhar Reddy
1982	Katnam Katnam Katnam	Sreedhar Reddy
1981	Cheyutha	K. S. Ch. Bose
1977	Dhomala Pai Dhadi	Produced by Hyderabad Municipal Corporation
1971	Samsaram	C. D. Kishore

Nandi Award for the Third Best Documentary Film

Year	Film	Producer
1993	Hyderabad Akshara Jyothi	T. Lakshmipathi
1983	Andaram Okkate	A. Bharati
1981	Reflection	G. Hemalatha
