= Karthavyam (1990 film) =

- Film poster
- Directed by: A. Mohan Gandhi
- Screenplay by: A. Mohan Gandhi
- Dialogues by: Paruchuri Brothers
- Story by: Paruchuri Brothers
- Produced by: A. M. Rathnam
- Starring: Vijayashanti; Vinod Kumar; Nirmalamma; Charan Raj; Uday Prakash
- Cinematography: D. Prasad Babu
- Edited by: Gautham Raju
- Music by: Raj–Koti
- Production company: Surya Movies
- Release date: 29 June 1990
- Running time: 150 minutes
- Country: India
- Language: Telugu
- Budget: ₹90 lakh
- Box office: est. ₹7 crore

Karthavyam (transl. Duty) is a 1990 Indian Telugu-language political action film directed by Mohan Gandhi and produced by A. M. Rathnam. It stars Vijayashanti and Vinod Kumar in the lead roles. Written by Paruchuri Brothers and Mohan Gandhi, the film is loosely based on the real-life story of police officer Kiran Bedi.

Made on a budget of ₹90 lakh, the film was a commercial success, grossing over ₹7 crore. Vijayashanti won the National Film Award for Best Actress for her performance in this film. The film premiered at the 14th International Film Festival of India in the mainstream section. The film was subsequently dubbed into Tamil as Vyjayanthi IPS, which was also a huge success at the box office. The film was remade in Hindi as Tejasvini (1994) with Vijayashanti reprising her role, and later in Tamil as Bhavani (2011).

A spin-off Arjun S/O Vyjayanthi starring Vijayashanti who reprised her legendary role once again as Vijayanthi IPS and Nandamuri Kalyan Ram in lead roles released in 2025 and received mixed reviews from critics and audience.

== Plot ==
Vyjayanthi is an Assistant Superintendent of Police and a sincere cop who strives to confront a corrupt local leader Muddu Krishnayya and his son's atrocities; she is committed to making a difference and seeking justice.

== Cast ==
- Vijayashanti as ASP Vyjayanthi, an IPS officer
- Vinod Kumar as Suribabu
- Nirmalamma as Mahalakshmi
- Meena as Karuna
- Charan Raj as Kaasipathi
- Atluri Pundarikakshaiah as Muddu Krishnayya
- Uday Prakash as Chakravarthy, Muddu Krishnayya's son
- Sai Kumar as Murali, Srihari's son
- Nutan Prasad as ASP Ram Mohan Rao
- Sakshi Ranga Rao as Constable Ranganayakulu
- P. L. Narayana as Constable Gopal Swamy
- Paruchuri Venkateswara Rao as A. Srihari Rao, Public Prosecutor
- Narra Venkateswara Rao as Defense Lawyer
- Tatineni Rajeswari as Vyjayanthi's mother
- Babu Mohan as Babu Rao
- Kakarala as Karuna's father
- J. V. Ramana Murthi as Principal Ramakrishna
- Pavala Syamala
- P. J. Sarma

== Awards ==
- 1990 - National Film Award for Best Actress - Vijayashanti
- 1990 - Filmfare Award for Best Actress – Telugu - Vijayashanti
- 1990 - Filmfare Award for Best Film - Telugu - A. M. Rathnam
- 1990 - Nandi Award for Best Actress - Vijayashanti
- 1990 - Nandi Award for Best Story Writer - Paruchuri Brothers
