= Mrugathrushna =

Mruathrushna
- Directed by: P. Sambasiva Rao
- Written by: Vasireddy Sita Devi; Jandhyala (lyrics)
- Starring: Revathi; Sarath Babu; P. L. Narayana; Ravindra; Nirmala; Subha
- Cinematography: Madhu Ambat
- Edited by: N. Srinivas
- Music by: Jandhyala (lyrics)
- Release date: 1990
- Running time: 131 minutes
- Country: India
- Language: Telugu

Mrugathrushna is a 1990 Indian Telugu feature film directed by P. Sambasiva Rao, with Revathi in the lead role, The film is about an inspiring journey of a lower-class woman. The film was premiered at the International Film Festival of India.

== Plot ==
Sunanda is a working woman who lives in a hostel sharing a room with Sujatha. Sunanda hopes eventually to marry Ravindra but when her boss proposes marriage to her she remembers her past life of extreme poverty and accepts. She is not sure she has made the right decision and on the way to their marriage her fiancée, realising the true situation, releases her and advises her to marry Ravindra, pledging his support to both of them. It is too late however, for Ravindra and Sujatha are already on the way to being married.

== Cast ==
- Revathi as Sunanda
- Sarath Babu
- P. L. Narayana
- Ravindra as Ravindra
- Nirmala
- Subha
