= K. N. T. Sastry =

Indian film critic and director (1945–2018)

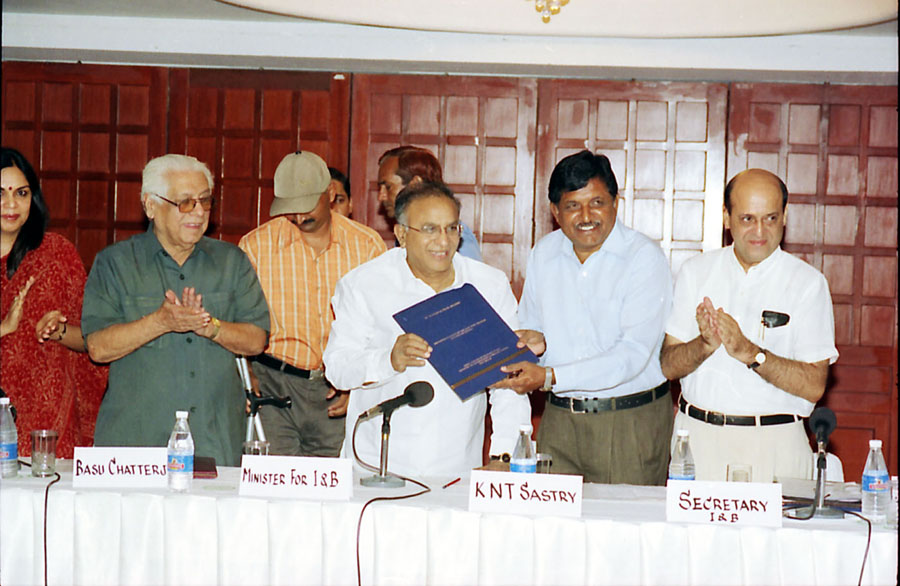
- K. N. T. Sastry in New Delhi on 14 August 2004
- Born: 5 September 1945
- Died: 13 September 2018 (aged 73)
- Occupations: Director; Writer; Film Critic

Kanaala Nanjunda Tirumala Sastry (5 September 1945 – 13 September 2018) was an Indian film critic, screenwriter, director, littérateur, and producer, known for his works predominantly in Telugu cinema. He has garnered six National Film Awards, three Nandi Awards and three International honors.

He served as chairman of critics Jury at National Film Awards. Sastry was a jury member of Vladivostok International Film Festival 2003; five time jury member for Indian Panorama-International Film Festival of India; jury member the Nandi Awards, Government of Andhra Pradesh, and Fipresci jury member at Kinotavr film festival and Busan International Film Festival.

Sastry's Thilaadanam received "New Currents Award" at the 7th Busan International Film Festival. He worked on many research projects with veteran director B. Narsing Rao. Sastry's English Documentary Harvesting Baby Girls won the Special Jury Award at International Documentary Film Festival Amsterdam.

== Noted publications ==
- Chittoor V. Nagaiah: A Monologue
- Nalo Nenu a Monologue of Bhanumathi Ramakrishna
- Alanti Chalanchitram First 25 Years of Telugu cinema

== Filmography ==
Year	Film	Director	Producer	Screenwriter	Notes
1987	Maa Ooru			Yes	National Film Award for Best Anthropological/Ethnographic Film; Media Wave Award at the Hungary International festival of visual arts Best Film International Documentary Film Festival Amsterdam
1988	Daasi			Yes	National Film Award for Best Feature Film in Telugu; Diploma of Merit award at Moscow Film Festival
1999	Surabhi	Yes		Yes	Documentary - Short Film; Nandi Award for Best Documentary Film; National Film Award for Best Anthropological/Ethnographic Film
2000	Thilaadanam	Yes		Yes	New York Indian Film Festival; New Currents Award - 7th Busan International Film Festival
2003	Harvesting Baby Girls	Yes	Yes	Yes	Special Jury Award International Documentary Film Festival Amsterdam
2006	Kamli	Yes		Yes	National Film Award for Best Feature Film in Telugu
2016	Shaanu	Yes		Yes	The Golden Elephant Festival

== Awards ==
National Film Awards

- Best Film Critic - 1989
- Best Book on Cinema (Publisher) - 1993
- Special Jury Award / Special Mention - Book on Cinema - 1995
- Best Ethnographic Film - 1999
- Best Debut Film of a Director - 2002
- Best Feature Film in Telugu - 2007

International Honours

- Special Jury Award, Harvesting Baby Girls, at International Documentary Film Festival Amsterdam
- New Currents Award at the 7th Busan International Film Festival in South Korea
- Fipresci Jury Member at Kinotavr film festival and Busan International Film Festival

Nandi Awards

- Best First Film of a Director - Thilaadanam (2001)
- First Best Documentary Film - Surabhi (1999)
- Best Book on Telugu Cinema - Alanati Chalana Chitram (1995)
