= Aasayam =

- Directed by: A. Mohan Gandhi
- Screenplay by: Paruchuri Brothers
- Dialogues by: Paruchuri Brothers
- Story by: Paruchuri Brothers
- Produced by: Vijayashanti; A. M. Rathnam
- Starring: Vijayashanti; Jagapati Babu
- Cinematography: D. Prasad Babu
- Edited by: Gautham Raju
- Music by: Raj–Koti
- Production company: Sri Surya Movies
- Release date: 5 March 1993
- Running time: 142 minutes
- Country: India
- Language: Telugu

Aasayam (transl. Aim) is a 1993 Telugu-language political film, produced by A. M. Rathnam under the Sri Surya Movies banner and directed by A. Mohan Gandhi. It is a lady oriented movie with Vijayashanti playing the lead role and Jagapathi Babu in another important role and music composed by Raj–Koti. The film won two Nandi Awards.

== Cast ==
- Vijayashanti as Sarojini
- Jagapati Babu as Suri Babu
- Srikanth as a student
- C. S. Rao as Chief Minister
- Vijayakumar as Collector Chakrapani
- Devan as Home Minister Reddappa
- Tanikella Bharani as M.L.A.
- Paruchuri Venkateswara Rao as Srihari Rao
- Charan Raj as Inspector Sagar
- Sudhakar as Manoj
- Babu Mohan as M. L. A. Yalamanda
- Narra Venkateswara Rao as Ananda Rao
- Vallabaneni Jaanardhan
- Kadambari Kiran as Shobhanadri
- Surya as Ramesh
- Vankayala Satyanarayana as Speaker
- Ironleg Sastri
- Vadivukkarasi as Kasthuri (Chakrapani's wife)
- Santhi as Shobha
- Dubbing Janaki
- Disco Shanti in item number
- Nirmalamma as Naga Ratnam
- Baby Sunayana as Sagar's daughter

== Production ==
Politician and activist Maneka Gandhi attended the film's launch and clapped the clapboard.

== Awards ==
Nandi Awards – 1993

- Best Story Writer – Paruchuri Brothers
- Best Supporting Actor – Paruchuri Venkateswara Rao
