= Vijay (1989 film) =

- Title card
- Directed by: B. Gopal
- Screenplay by: B. Gopal
- Story by: Paruchuri Brothers
- Produced by: Akkineni Venkat
- Starring: Nagarjuna; Vijayashanti
- Cinematography: S. Gopal Reddy
- Edited by: K. A. Marthand
- Music by: Chakravarthy
- Production company: Annapurna Studios
- Release date: 19 January 1989
- Country: India
- Language: Telugu

Vijay is a 1989 Indian Telugu-language action film, produced by Venkat Akkineni under the Annapurna Studios banner and directed by B. Gopal. It stars Nagarjuna, Vijayashanti and music composed by Chakravarthy.

== Cast ==
- Nagarjuna as Vijay
- Vijayashanti as Latha
- Mohan Babu as Puligolla Pasupathi
- Nutan Prasad as Puligolla Parameshwara Rao
- Jayasudha as Yamuna Devi
- Jaggayya
- Sarath Babu as Giridhar
- Allu Ramalingaiah
- Suthi Velu
- Narra Venkateswara Rao
- Chalapathi Rao as Kaka Rao
- Vijayaranga Raju
- P. L. Narayana
- Ramana Reddy
- Chidatala Appa Rao
- Chitti Babu
- Gowtham Raju
- Jenny as Defence Council
- Sandhya
- Tatineni Rajeswari
- Y. Vijaya
- Nirmalamma

== Soundtrack ==
Vijay

Film score by Chakravarthy
- Released: 1989
- Genre: Soundtrack
- Length: 17:22
- Label: AMC Audio
- Producer: Chakravarthy

Chakravarthy chronology
Attaku Yamudu Ammayiki Mogudu (1989)	Vijay (1989)	Gudachari 117 (1989)

The music was composed by Chakravarthy. Music was released on AMC Audio Company.

S. No.	Song title	Singers	lyrics	length
1	"Vaana Raatiri Aarubaita"	S. P. Balasubrahmanyam, Chitra	Jonnavithhula Ramalingeswara Rao	3:55
2	"Ayyayyo Chetilo Dabbulu"	Mano, P. Susheela, Madhavapeddi Ramesh	Veturi	3:39
3	"Kalyana Sundariki"	S. P. Balasubrahmanyam, S. Janaki	Veturi	4:21
4	"Yela Gela Gela"	S. P. Balasubrahmanyam, S. Janaki	Veturi	3:35
5	"Dangu Chikku Pillo"	S. P. Balasubrahmanyam	Jaladhi	2:52
