= Nandi Award for Best Supporting Actor =

Indian film award

The Nandi Award for Best Supporting Actor is an award presented at the Nandi Awards. It was instituted in 1981. This is a list of the award recipients and the films they have won for.

== Winners ==
Year	Actor	Role	Film	Ref.
2016	Mohanlal	Sathyam	Janatha Garage	
2015	Posani Krishna Murali	Narayan Murthy	Temper	
2014	Naga Chaitanya	Nagarjuna	Manam	
2013	Prakash Raj	Relangi Mavayya	Seethamma Vakitlo Sirimalle Chettu	
2012	Ajay	Siva	Ishq	
2011	Prakash Raj	Shankar Narayana	Dookudu	
2010	P. Sai Kumar		Prasthanam	
2009	Ramjagan		Mahatma	
2008	Allari Naresh	Gali Seenu	Gamyam	
2007	Jagapathi Babu	ACP Bose	Lakshyam	
2006	Prakash Raj		Bommarillu	
2005	Srihari	Sivaramakrishna	Nuvvostanante Nenoddantana	
2004	Shashank	Shashank	Sye	
2003	Murali Mohan		Vegu Chukkalu	
2002	Prakash Raj	Amzad Bhai	Khadgam	
2001	Murali Mohan		Preminchu	
2000	Kota Srinivasa Rao		Pruvthvi Narayana	
1999	K. Viswanath	Raghavayya	Kalisundam Raa	
1998	Jagapathi Babu		Anthapuram	
1997	Surya		Sindhooram	
1996	S. P. Balasubrahmanyam	Viswanath	Pavithra Bandham	
1995	D. Appa Rao		Cheemala Dandu	
1994	Brahmanandam		Anna	
1993	Paruchuri Venkateswara Rao		Aasayam	
1992	Nutan Prasad		Vasundhara	
1991	Vinod Kumar		Mamagaru	
1990	M. Prabhakar Reddy		Chinna Kodalu	
1989	Sarath Babu		Neerajanam	
1988	Sarath Babu		O Bharya Katha	
1987	Thathaji		Badi	
1986	P. L. Narayana		Repati Pourulu	
1985	Suthi Velu		Vande Mataram	
1984	Nutan Prasad		Sundari Subbarao	
1983	P. L. Narayana		Neti Bharatham	
1982	Gummadi		Maro Malupu	
1981	Sarath Babu		Seethakoka Chiluka	

== See also ==
- Nandi Awards
- Cinema of Andhra Pradesh
