= Gundagardi =

- Promotional Poster
- Directed by: V. Sai Prasad
- Story by: V. Sai Prasad
- Produced by: M.C. Bokadia
- Starring: Dharmendra; Aditya Pancholi; Vijayashanti; Raj Babbar
- Music by: Jatin–Lalit
- Production company: BMB Productions
- Release date: 6 June 1997
- Country: India
- Language: Hindi

Gundagardi (transl. Hooliganism or rowdyism) is a 1997 Indian Hindi-language action film directed by V. Sai Prasad and produced by M.C. Bokadia, starring Vijayashanti, Raj Babbar and Gulshan Grover with Dharmendra in a supporting role. The film was dubbed in Telugu as Gunda Darbar and in Tamil as Thalaivi.

== Plot ==
The two brothers Kalicharan and Narshima cause havoc all over the city. The police call in Karan Singh as the most effective policeman to fight against them. His sister was married to a journalist. He encounters a murder of the minister by Kalicharan and decides to print their photos in the newspaper. But before he can do that he is killed along with his wife. Dipa is an eyewitness to this murder. But he soon plans and makes Dipa the key suspect in an attempt-to-murder case of the home minister. Karan Singh, in the meanwhile, trains Dipa to fight back against the goons. She manages to get the files containing the proof. Kalicharan is arrested and taken to court. Narshima makes a number of attempts to free his brother. A severe struggle ensues and Narshima and Kalicharan get death sentences.

== Cast ==
- Dharmendra as Police Commissioner Karan Singh
- Raj Babbar as Kalicharan
- Aditya Pancholi as Raja
- Vijayashanti as Deepa
- Ayub Khan as Ajay
- Simran as Guddi
- Gulshan Grover as Narsimha
- Harish (in song Saila Saila)

== Soundtrack ==
#	Title	Singer(s)	Lyricist(s)
1	"Bheja Jo Pyar"	Kumar Sanu, Kavita Krishnamurthy	Kavita Kiran
2	"Sooraj Ka Ishq"	Kumar Sanu, Sadhana Sargam	Anwar Sagar
3	"Ek Do Teen"	Alka Yagnik, Jolly Mukherjee	Shyam Anuragi
4	"Aankhon Hi"	Abhijeet, Sadhana Sargam	Dev Kohli
5	"Bahar Baras"	Kumar Sanu, Alka Yagnik	Maya Govind
6	"Saila Saila"	Hariharan	Maya Govind
7	"Jaadu Bhari Teri"	Kumar Sanu	Shyam Raj
8	"Thumak Thumak"	Ila Arun, Shabbir Kumar	Rani Malik
