= Prathibhavanthudu =

1986 Telugu film by Prabhakara Reddy

- Directed by: Prabhakara Reddy
- Written by: Prabhakara Reddy
- Produced by: S. Ramachandra Rao
- Starring: Krishna Ghattamaneni; Bhanupriya
- Music by: Satyam
- Production company: SR Films
- Release date: 16 May 1986
- Country: India
- Language: Telugu

Prathibhavanthudu is a 1986 Indian Telugu-language film written and directed by Prabhakar Reddy and produced by S. Ramachandra Rao for SR Films, starring Krishna Ghattamaneni and Bhanupriya in the lead roles. The film has musical score by Satyam.

== Cast ==
- Krishna Ghattamaneni as Vijay
- Bhanupriya
- Gummadi
- Prasad Babu as Ramesh
- Sridhar as Suresh
- Annapurna as Shantha
- Shubha

== Soundtrack ==
Satyam scored and composed the film's soundtrack, while Athreya wrote the lyrics.

1. "Adi Nenanukunnana" -
2. "Amrutham Tagina" (Sad) -
3. "Amrutham Tagina" - M.M Keeravani
4. "Chuputho Banamese" -
5. "Chustava Chudarani" -
6. "O Yemmo Etta" -
