= Bandham (2018 TV series) =

- Genre: Drama; Family
- Written by: Dhivakar babu Dialogues; Rashid Basha
- Screenplay by: Rahul varma
- Directed by: Sravana Bhaskar Reddy (1-129); Srinivas (130-250); Polani Nagendra kumar (251- present)
- Starring: season 1 Bharadwaj; Anika Rao; Sindhura dharmasanam season 2 Niharika; Aishwarya Raj; Abhishek Yannam; Devaraj Reddy
- Country of origin: India
- Original language: Telugu
- No. of seasons: 2
- No. of episodes: 819

Production
- Producers: Thamatam Kumar Reddy; Ramireddy Ramanji Reddy
- Cinematography: Janardhan Rao; Bandlamudi venkatesh
- Editors: R. Vikram Reddy; Chandu; K Tejeswar Reddy; Gattu pavan Kumar Gowda (295-present); Akhanda
- Camera setup: Multi-camera
- Running time: 20-22 minutes
- Production companies: Sri Varasiddi Vinayaka films Dream2 Animations Pvt. Ltd

Original release
- Network: Gemini TV
- Release: 16 July 2018 – 21 August 2021

Bandham is an Indian Telugu language soap opera directed by Polani Nagendra kumar premiered on 16 July 2018 and ended on 21 August 2021 aired on Gemini TV every Monday to Saturday. The serial stars Bharadwaj, Sindhura, Anika Rao in season 1 and Niharika, Aishwarya Raj, Abhishek Yannam, Devaraj Reddy in season 2 as main protagonists.

== Cast ==
=== Season 2 ===
- Niharika as Vaishnavi
- Aishwarya Raj as Bhoomi
- Gowri Shankar / Abhishek Yannam as Akhil
- Devaraj Reddy as Rakesh
- Swaroopa as Parvathi (Vaishnavi's Grand mother)
- Lydia

=== Season 1 ===
- Bharadwaj as Balu
- Sindhura Dharmasanam as Devaki
- Anika Rao as Yashoda
- Sandhya peddada as Parvathi (Balu's mother, Vaishnavi and Bhoomi's grand mother)
- J L Srinivas as Ranganath (Balu's father, Vaishnavi and Bhoomi's grand father)
- Venu kshatriya as Hari
- Prasad Babu as Nagendra Prasad (Devaki's father)
- Sujatha Reddy / Madhavi as Bharathi (Devaki's mother)
- Baby Vasuki / Baby Sahasra as Bhoomi (Balu and Devaki's daughter)
- Baby Siri / Baby Greeshma as Vaishu (Balu and Yashoda's daughter)
- Nakshatra as Sanjana
- Sujatha as Jagadeeswari
- Naveen as Parthasaradhi
- Anchor Bhargav as Avinash
- Lavanya Reddy as Bhavani (Devaki's sister)
- Madhavi latha as Lakshmi (Yashoda's mother)
- Kranthi as Nagamani
- Ram Mohan as Satyam
- Sindhuja as Deepa
- Naveena
- Sravani
- Nata kumari
