= Kondaveeti Donga =

1990 film by A. Kodandarami Reddy

- Film poster
- Directed by: A. Kodandarami Reddy
- Written by: Paruchuri Brothers (story and dialogue)
- Screenplay by: Yandamuri Veerendranath
- Produced by: T. Trivikrama Rao
- Starring: Chiranjeevi; Vijayashanti; Sharada; Radha; Mohan Babu; Rao Gopal Rao; Amrish Puri
- Cinematography: V. S. R. Swamy
- Edited by: Kotagiri Venkateswara Rao
- Music by: Ilaiyaraaja
- Production company: Prasad Studios
- Distributed by: Vijayalakshmi Art Movies
- Release date: 9 March 1990
- Running time: 151 minutes
- Country: India
- Language: Telugu

Kondaveeti Donga (transl. The Thief of Kondaveedu) is a 1990 Indian Telugu-language vigilante action drama film directed by A. Kodandarami Reddy. The film is a remake of the 1989 Bengali film Asha O Bhalobasha, which itself is based on Shaktipada Rajguru's revisionist novel of the same name. The film stars Chiranjeevi, Vijayashanti, and Radha in lead roles.

It was released on 9 April 1990 and became notable for being presented in 70 mm format with 6-track stereophonic sound, a rarity at the time. The film received positive reviews upon release and emerged as a blockbuster at the box office. It was later dubbed into Tamil as Thangamalai Thirudan and into Malayalam as Kodanadu Kallan.

== Plot ==
Kondaveeti Raja, an orphan raised by the residents of the tribal village Kondaveedu, becomes an M.A., L.L.B., and I.A.S. officer with their support. Upon returning to Kondaveedu from Hyderabad, he finds the village plagued by corruption and exploitation. The local mafia and landlords—Sarabhoji, Narasimham, and Khaadra—oppress the villagers through political corruption, forgery, smuggling, drug trafficking, land grabbing, and excessive taxation on farmers.

Disillusioned with the ineffective legal system, Raja adopts the persona of a Robin Hood-like figure. Disguised, he conducts daring heists, stealing money and paddy worth crores from the landlords. He uses the stolen wealth to empower the villagers by funding irrigation projects, providing healthcare and education, and transforming the tribals into self-sustaining farmers. His efforts improve the living conditions of Kondaveedu, while his actions frustrate the corrupt officials and landlords exploiting the village.

== Cast ==
- Chiranjeevi as Kondaveeti Raja, an orphan raised by the tribals who becomes Kondaveeti Donga, a Robin Hood-like figure fighting against injustice.
- Vijayashanti as Sri Lekha, an undercover police officer tasked with capturing Kondaveeti Donga, who later falls in love with Raja.
- Radha as Sri Kanya, a home surgeon serving in Kondaveedu, who discovers Kondaveeti Donga's true identity.
- Rao Gopal Rao as Sarabhoji, a corrupt landlord
- Mohan Babu as Narasimham, a corrupt landlord
- Amrish Puri as Khaadra and Yugandhar
- Sarada as Sambhavi
- Kaikala Satyanarayana as Das
- Nagendra Babu as Seetababu
- Prasad Babu
- Brahmanandam
- Allu Rama Lingaiah
- Nirmalamma
- Sreedhar as Raja's father
- Kallu Chidambaram
- Chalapathi Rao
- Ranganath
- Manik Irani
- Srividya as Justice Sandya
- Divyavani
- Master Suresh

== Soundtrack ==
The soundtrack composed by Ilaiyaraaja was an instant chart buster. All songs remain popular to date. Except “Chamaku Cham” all lyrics were written by Veturi. The song "Subalekha" was remixed in Naayak (2013) while the song "Chamak Chamak" was remixed in Inttelligent (2018).

=== Telugu (original soundtrack) ===
All music is composed by Ilaiyaraaja.

| No. | Title | Lyrics | Artist(s) | Length |
|---|---|---|---|---|
| 1. | "Kola Kolamma" | Veturi | S. P. Balasubrahmanyam, S. Janaki | 4:24 |
| 2. | "Subhalekha Rasukunna" | Veturi | S. P. Balasubrahmanyam, K. S. Chitra | 4:32 |
| 3. | "Chamaku Chamaku" | Sirivennela Seetharama Sastry | S. P. Balasubrahmanyam, K. S. Chitra | 4:41 |
| 4. | "Tip Top" | Veturi | S. P. Balasubrahmanyam, S. Janaki | 4:27 |
| 5. | "Jeevithame" | Veturi | S. P. Balasubrahmanyam | 4:06 |
| 6. | "Sri Anjaneyam" | Veturi | S. P. Balasubrahmanyam, S. Janaki | 4:29 |
| 7. | "Devi Sambavi" | Veturi | S. P. Balasubrahmanyam, S. Janaki | 1:09 |

== Reception ==
Giddaluri Gopalrao of Zamin Ryot, writing his review on 23 March 1990, gave a positive review for the film. Gopalrao praised the screenplay by Yandamuri and Chiranjeevi's performance.

The film had collected a distributors share of ₹74 lakh on its opening weekend.
