= Vande Mataram (1985 film) =

1985 film by T. Krishna

- Theatrical release poster
- Directed by: T. Krishna
- Written by: M. V. S. Haranatha Rao (dialogues)
- Screenplay by: T. Krishna
- Story by: T. Krishna
- Produced by: Anil Babu; Y. Harikrishna (Presents)
- Starring: Vijayashanti; Rajasekhar
- Cinematography: R. Rama Rao
- Edited by: Choudula Subba Rao
- Music by: Chakravarthy
- Production company: Krishna Chitra
- Release date: 27 September 1985
- Running time: 173 min
- Country: India
- Language: Telugu

Vande Mataram (transl. Mother, I bow to thee) is a 1985 Indian Telugu-language film written and directed by T. Krishna, and produced by Krishna Chitra. It stars Vijayashanti and Rajasekhar, with music composed by Chakravarthy. The film is the debut of actor Rajasekhar in the Telugu film industry.

The popular song Vandemataram in the film, written by C. Narayana Reddy was first written much earlier, published in a magazine, made popular by singers of Praja Natya Mandali. The singer Srinivas who sang the song was later called Vandemataram Srinivas. The film won two Nandi Awards.

== Cast ==
- Vijayashanti as Shanthi
- Dr. Rajashekar as Satyam
- Rajendra Prasad as Dr.G. N. Kal /Nukaal
- Kota Srinivasa Rao
- Suthi Veerabhadra Rao
- Suthi Velu as Lakchanna
- Sakshi Ranga Rao as Brahmaiah
- P. L. Narayana as Manikyam
- Narra Venkateswara Rao as Eeswaraiah
- Saikumar
- Sai Chand as Maridaiah
- Benerjee
- Ramaraju
- Bhimeswara Rao as Bhushanam
- Chitti Babu as Papaiah
- Ramana Reddy
- Narsing Yadav
- Muthyala Subbaiah
- Pushpa Kumari
- Dubbing Janaki as Mahalakshmi
- Lakshmi Priya
- Shaheeda
- Bindu Madhavi
- Devi as Seetalu
- Vaani as Kamalamma
- Nirmalamma as Satyam's grandmother
- Jayamalini as item number
- Anuradha as item number

== Soundtrack ==
Vandemataram

Film score by Chakravarthy
- Released: 1985
- Genre: Soundtrack
- Length: 28:58
- Label: AVM Audio
- Producer: Chakravarthy

Chakravarthy chronology
America Alludu (1985)	Vandemataram (1985)	Ragile Gundelu (1985)

Music composed by Chakravarthy. Lyrics were written by C. Narayana Reddy, Dasam Gopalakrishna (Allatappa) and Adrushta Deepak (Naa Peru Palleturu). Music released on AVM Audio Company.

S.No	Song title	Singers	length
1	"Aakasama Neevekkada"	S. P. Balasubrahmanyam, S. Janaki	5:39
2	"Allatappa Aadannni Kadu"	S. P. Sailaja, P. Susheela	5:33
3	"Naa Peru Palletooru"	S. P. Sailaja, M. Ramesh	8:45
4	"Edaya Mee Daya"	S. P. Balasubrahmanyam, S. Janaki	4:17
5	"Vandemataram"	Srinivas	4:44

== Awards ==
Nandi Awards

- Third Best Feature Film - Bronze - Y. Anil Babu
- Best Supporting Actor - Suthivelu
