= Bhale Donga =

- Theatrical release poster
- Directed by: A. Kodandarami Reddy
- Screenplay by: A. Kodandarami Reddy
- Story by: G. Satyamurthy
- Produced by: K. Devi Vara Prasad
- Starring: Nandamuri Balakrishna; Vijayashanti; Sharada
- Cinematography: V. S. R. Swamy
- Edited by: Kotagiri Venkateswara Rao
- Music by: Chakravarthy
- Production company: Devi Films
- Release date: 10 February 1989
- Running time: 151 minutes
- Country: India
- Language: Telugu

Bhale Donga (transl. What a Thief!!!) is a 1989 Telugu-language action film produced by K. Devi Vara Prasad under the Devi Films banner, directed by A. Kodandarami Reddy. It stars Nandamuri Balakrishna, Vijayashanti and music composed by Chakravarthy. The film was also dubbed into Hindi under the title Qaidi no.1. The film was recorded as a Hit at the box office.

== Plot ==
The film begins with a swashbuckling thief, Surendra, who is also a master of disguise. He always targets Vidhatha, the city's dictator, and SP Indrani, a spiteful Police officer, tracks him down. Surendra contracts a multi-specialty hospital for work free of cost with all this money. Dr. Rekha, the younger sister of Indrani, is inspired by Surendra's good heart and starts loving him. After several other successful attempts, Surendra is caught by Rekha one day, and when she questions him, he reveals his past. His father, an honest person, had collected donations from the town's people to construct the hospital with his partner Vidhatha.

Vidhatha had double-crossed him and stolen the entire account, placing the blame on his father, which led to his suicide. That is why Surendra is taking revenge against Vidhatha. In another attempt, Surendra is trapped and arrested by Indrani; she tells him that he had been doing this for his welfare only because she had a personal fight with Vidhatha, whose actual name is Vijay, who was her ex-lover, who had killed her parents and escaped from imprisonment. Now Surendra and Indrani join. Whether they can take revenge against Vidhatha and whether Surendra can complete the hospital forms the rest of the story.

== Cast ==
- Nandamuri Balakrishna as Surendra
- Vijayashanti as Rekha
- Rao Gopal Rao as Viswanatham Master
- Sharada as SP Indrani
- Mohan Babu as Manmadha Rao
- Charan Raj as Vidhata / Vijay
- Ranganath as Surendra's father
- Annapurna as Purna
- Chalapathi Rao as Potharaju, Vidhata's henchman
- Brahmanandam as Surendra's henchmen
- Sri Lakshmi as Coolie
- Hema as Hema
- P. L. Narayana as Silpi Veerachari
- Sakshi Ranga Rao as Doctor
- Telephone Satyanarayana
- Hemasundar

== Soundtrack ==
Bhale Donga

Film score by Chakravarthy
- Released: 1989
- Genre: Soundtrack
- Length: 22:08
- Label: LEO Audio
- Producer: Chakravarthy

Chakravarthy chronology
Ramudu Bheemudu (1988)	Bhale Donga (1989)	Ontari Poratam (1989)

Music composed by Chakravarthy. Lyrics were written by Veturi. Music released on LEO Audio Company.

S. No	Song title	Singers	length
1	"Pedavini Choodu"	S. P. Balasubrahmanyam, S. Janaki	4:32
2	"Kanne Pilla"	S. P. Balasubrahmanyam, S. Janaki	4:42
3	"Mallelo Match Match"	S. P. Balasubrahmanyam, S. Janaki	4:10
4	"Yeam Muddu"	S. P. Balasubrahmanyam, S. Janaki	4:31
5	"Adigindhi Isthe"	S. P. Balasubrahmanyam, S. Janaki	4:13
