= Indrudu Chandrudu =

- Theatrical release poster
- Directed by: Suresh Krissna
- Written by: Story & Dialogues: Paruchuri Brothers; Screenplay: Kamal Haasan
- Produced by: D. Ramanaidu
- Starring: Kamal Haasan; Vijayashanti; Srividya; Charan Raj; Jayalalita
- Cinematography: P. S. Prakash
- Edited by: K. Thanikachalam
- Music by: Ilaiyaraaja
- Production company: Suresh Productions
- Release date: 24 November 1989
- Running time: 158 minutes
- Country: India
- Language: Telugu

Indrudu Chandrudu is a 1989 Indian Telugu-language black comedy film directed by Suresh Krissna and produced by D. Ramanaidu, starring Kamal Haasan in a dual role, alongside Vijayashanti and Charan Raj. It was released on 24 November 1989. The film is based on the 1988 American film Moon over Parador.

In the film, a corrupt mayor is disillusioned when he learns that his "loyal" assistant and his mistress have been conspiring against him for quite some time. When he tries to expose his assistant's criminal activities, the assistant impulsively murders the mayor. He then blackmails a look-alike of the mayor into impersonating the dead man. His convenient puppet ruler has an agenda of his own, and is regularly scheming against his new master.

== Plot ==
G. K. Rayudu is a corrupt Mayor. Along with his assistant Tripathi, he takes a bribe, sells a market to a rich businessman, and forces the poor people doing business in the land to move out, threatening physical harm. Although Rayudu is married to Janaki, he has a mistress who is his secretary. Rayudu knows that a journalist Sandhya is investigating. He and his henchmen go to her place to destroy the evidence. She reveals to Rayudu that his mistress and Tripathi are married and have been cheating him out of his money for a long time. He goes to Tripathi's house and finds a stash of diamonds and takes it. Rayudu gets a change of heart and returns to his house and spends sometime with his youngest kid, who is left at home as she's sick while the others are visiting a temple. Rayudu decides to expose his and Tripathi's illegal activities. Before he leaves, he gifts the diamonds to his little kid, who hides it inside one of her toys. Tripathi finds out, murders Rayudu in a fit of rage, and places the body in cold storage.

Panicking that soon people will realise that Rayudu is missing, Tripathi notices Rayudu's younger lookalike Chandram in a mental institution. Deducing that Chandram is faking his mental breakdown to beat a murder charge and avoid jail, they blackmail Chandram into playing Rayudu until a major deal is completed, and Tripathi gets a lot of money. Chandram is promised freedom if he is successful. Chandram learns Rayudu's speech and mannerisms, and with heavy prosthetics and makeup, he becomes a suitable double for the Mayor.

Sandhya is trying to expose Rayudu for his illegal activities, but she hasn't found any real evidence yet. As she comes close to exposing Chandram's identity mistakenly, Tripathi sends goons to kill her. Chandram, having heard this, removes his disguise, sneaks out, and saves Sandhya from the goons. When Sandhya gets suspicious about the resemblance between him and Rayudu, Chandram lies that he is Rayudu's son who doesn't like his father's illegal ways. Tripathi's search for his diamonds using Chandram proves futile.

Sandhya decides to charm Chandram to get real evidence of Rayudu's illegal activities, so she flirts with him, and they try to meet many times. This leads to hilarious situations in which Chandram has to sneak out without Tripathi's knowledge. Tripathi tries to kill Sandhya one more time. Chandram saves her again, but his cover is blown. Both are on the run from the corrupt police and Tripathi.

Chandram finally reveals the truth about his murder charge to the reporter. He used to be a singer and dancer. A contractor named Vallabha Rao (Gollapudi Maruthi Rao), who tells him that he will help him and his female dance partner become famous and invites them to a hotel room. While Vallabha Rao sends Chandram to receive someone, he brutally tries to rape the female dancer and murders her. He uses his influence to put the blame on Chandram. Chandram is found guilty, but during the trial, he fakes intellectual disability and is put in the mental institution. Sandhya and Chandram then fall for each other. Tired of running, they hatch a plan to stop Tripathi and Vallabha Rao, who also happens to be the assistant's partner.

Chandram goes back to the crowded market that he sold in the beginning of the film and proclaims that he will give the land back to the people and expose illegal activities he had committed with Tripathi in a big public gathering soon. Tripathi realises that if he killed Rayudu, he would become the first suspect. He searches for a way to get the upper hand. He traces down Chandram's mother (Dubbing Janaki), kidnaps her, and uses this as a leverage to blackmail Chandram into not doing anything silly at the public meeting.

The day before the meeting, since Rayudu's children wanted to spend time with their father, Chandram impersonates Rayudu and plays with the kids. He accidentally finds the diamonds and leaves clues so that the children could find it in the future.

On the day of the meeting, a huge crowd is built up to hear the speech and it is attended by prominent ministers. Chandram, impersonating Rayudu, is being held on a close watch by Tripathi. With the help of Sandhya and her father (P. L. Narayana), he finds the location where his mother is being held captive by the corrupt politician who had sent him to jail. He weasels into the car of a prominent minister who asks the assistant to use a different vehicle. Finally free from the assistant's view, Chandram uses the opportunity to leave and rescue his mother, and the corrupt politician is killed in the process. Chandram comes back to the minister's vehicle just in time as the vehicle reaches the press conference, so Tripathi does not suspect anything.

During the press conference, Chandram details all the illegal activities he had committed along with Tripathi and other politicians and businessmen with evidence. Just as he finishes his speech, he is shot by an unknown assailant. Chandram turns to Tripathi and blames him before he collapses and dies. The crowd of people becomes agitated and beats Tripathi. An ambulance comes and picks up Chandram's body.

In the ambulance, Chandram gets up seemingly unharmed. The ambulance is driven by Sandhya's father, who was the unknown assassin. The faux assassination was a distraction to let everyone think that Chandram/Mayor is dead. They then reveal the real body of Rayudu inside the ambulance. They drive the ambulance into a power grid after jumping out of the vehicle. The ambulance explodes with Rayudu's body inside. To everyone's concern, Rayudu was killed by Tripathi during the press conference. Chandram then walks away to start a new life with Sandhya.

== Cast ==
- Kamal Haasan in dual role as:
  - Mayor G. K. Rayudu
  - Chandram
- Vijayashanti as "Sayankalam" Durga, news reporter (Voice dubbed by Roja Ramani)
- Srividya as Janaki, Rayudu's wife
- Nagesh as Minister
- Charan Raj as Tripathi, Rayudu's assistant
- Jayalalita as Veena
- P. L. Narayana as Durga's farther
- Gollapudi Maruthi Rao as Contractor Vallabha Rao
- Dubbing Janaki as Chandru's mother
- Divya as Chandru's dance partner
- E. V. V. Satyanarayana as Police Inspector
- Charle as Mental Patient
- Kavithalaya Krishnan as Mental Patient
- Crazy Mohan as Mental Patient
- Pradeep Shakthi as Doctor
- Gautam Raju
- Kuyili as dancer in song "Nachina Food"

== Production ==
This was Suresh's second collaboration with Kamal after Sathyaa (1988). For the scene where G. K. Rayudu has a massage, cinematographer P. S. Prakash used mask shots since there were no technical resources at that time.

== Soundtrack ==
The soundtrack was composed by Ilaiyaraaja. S. P. Balasubrahmanyam rendered the song "Nachina Fuddu Vechani Beddu" in a deeper voice to match the character Rayudu's voice and had to undergo nodule surgery.

Telugu
No.	Title	Lyrics	Singer(s)	Length
1.	"College Agelo Teenage Mojulo"	Veturi	S. P. Balasubrahmanyam, P. Susheela	4:05
2.	"Dora Dora Donga Muddu"	Veturi	S. P. Balasubrahmanyam, S. Janaki	4:46
3.	"Laali Jo Laali Jo Ooruko Papayi"	Sirivennela Sitaramasastri	S. P. Balasubrahmanyam	4:47
4.	"Nachina Fuddu Vechani Beddu"	Sirivennela Sitaramasastri	S. P. Balasubrahmanyam	4:33
5.	"Sandhya Ragapu Sarigamalo"	Veturi	S. P. Balasubrahmanyam, S. Janaki	4:43
Total length:				22:54

All lyrics are written by Vaali.

Tamil
No.	Title	Lyrics	Singer(s)	Length
1.	"College Degreeyum"	Vaali	Mano, K. S. Chithra	4:05
2.	"Nooru Nooru Mutham"	Vaali	Mano, K. S. Chithra	4:46
3.	"Aariro Aariraro"	Vaali	Mano	4:47
4.	"Adichidu Kottam"	Vaali	Mano	4:33
5.	"Kadhal Ragamum"	Vaali	Mano, K. S. Chithra	4:43
Total length:				22:54

All lyrics are written by Indeevar.

Hindi
No.	Title	Lyrics	Singer(s)	Length
1.	"Chhora Chhori Dono Milk Ke"	Indeevar	Asha Bhosle, Amit Kumar
2.	"Dil Ke Saaz Mein"	Indeevar	Asha Bhosle, Babla Mehta
3.	"Gudiya Rani Ji, Laadli Papa Ki"	Indeevar	Babla Mehta
4.	"Tasty Food Ho, Rangeen Bed Ho"	Indeevar	Babla Mehta
Total length:				22:54

== Release and reception ==
Indrudu Chandrudu was released on 24 November 1989. The film became commercial success and completed a theatrical run of 100 days. It was also dubbed in Tamil as Indhiran Chandhiran, released on 14 January 1990 and Hindi as Mayor Sahab.

== Accolades ==
Award	Date of ceremony	Category	Recipient(s)	Ref.
Nandi Awards	c. 1989	Best Actor	Kamal Haasan	
Filmfare Awards South	12 August 1990	Best Actor – Telugu	Kamal Haasan	
