= Jathara =

- Theatrical release poster
- Directed by: Dhavala Satyam
- Written by: Dhavala Satyam
- Produced by: R.S. Rama Raju
- Starring: Chiranjeevi; Sreedhar; Nagabushanam; Jayalakshmi; Leelavathi; P L Narayana; Mada
- Edited by: Vasanth Kumar Raju
- Music by: G.K. Venkatesh
- Production company: Soumya Cine Arts
- Release date: 13 March 1980
- Country: India
- Language: Telugu

Jathara is a Telugu film starring Chiranjeevi.

== Cast ==
- Chiranjeevi as Rambabu
- Sreedhar as Shankaram
- Nagabhushanam as Bhushaiah
- Mada as Kamaraju
- P. L. Narayana as Kishtamurthy
- Leelavathi as Shankaram and Rambabu's mother
- Suvarna as Rangi
- Indrani as Ramani
- Prasad Babu as Rebellious Villager
- Hari babu as Soldier
- G.S.R. Murthy

== Soundtrack ==
The song Maghamasa Velalo was based on G.K.Venkatesh's own composition Nooru Kannu Saaladu from the 1976 movie Raja Nanna Raja.

All music is composed by G K Venkatesh.

Track list
No.	Title	Lyrics	Singer(s)	Length
1.	"Valapulu Pongi Husharu Cheste"	Arudra	S Janaki, S P Balasubrahmanyam
2.	"Konaseema Kodegitta"	Kagithala Rajeswara Rao	S Janaki
3.	"Maghamasa Velalo Oka Naati Sandhyalo"	Gopi	S.P. Sailaja
4.	"Ranju Ranju Rangasaani"	Kosaraju	S P Balasubrahmanyam
