= Sankeertana =

- Theatrical release poster
- Directed by: Geetha Krishna
- Written by: Tanikella Bharani (dialogues)
- Screenplay by: Geetha Krishna
- Story by: Geetha Krishna
- Produced by: Dr. M. Gangaiah
- Starring: Nagarjuna; Ramya Krishna
- Cinematography: P. S. Nivas
- Edited by: Anil Malnad
- Music by: Ilaiyaraaja
- Production company: Konark Movie Creations
- Release date: 20 March 1987
- Running time: 136 minutes
- Country: India
- Language: Telugu

Sankeertana is a 1987 Telugu-language film, produced by M. Gangaiah under the Konark Movie Creations banner and directed by Geetha Krishna. It stars Nagarjuna and Ramya Krishna, with music composed by Ilaiyaraaja. It was released on 20 March 1987. The film was dubbed in Tamil as En Paadal Unakkaga. The film was partially adapted in Tamil as Deiva Vaakku.

== Plot ==
Keerthana is an orphan who is being brought up by a villager whose wife doesn't like her at all. Keerthana is learning dance from the famous teacher of the village. In this process, she falls in love with Kaasi, who belongs to a very low caste. The villagers believe that Keerthana is the goddess who came to save them and their village and hence Keerthana had lost her personal life. But now she has dared to love Kaasi and now she wanted to marry him. But will the village people allow their goddess to become a wife and what are the cruel consequences Keerthana and Kaasi had to face?

== Cast ==
- Nagarjuna as Kaasi
- Ramya Krishna as Keerthana
- Girish Karnad as Parameswara Sastry
- J. V. Somayajulu as Vasudeva Sarma
- Sarath Babu as Sravan Babu
- Sai Kumar
- Rallapalli
- Sakshi Ranga Rao as Rama Sarma
- Narra Venkateswara Rao
- Mallikarjuna Rao
- KK Sarma as Chidambaram Pillai
- Dham as Kodipetlu
- Y. Vijaya as Mahalakshmi
- Tara
- Master Suresh as young Kaasi
- Sivaji Raja

== Soundtrack ==
Music composed by Ilaiyaraaja was released on ECHO Audio Company.

Telugu (original)
No.	Title	Lyrics	Singer(s)	Length
1.	"Manasuna Molichina Sarigamale"	Sirivennela Seetharama Sastry	S. P. Balasubrahmanyam, S. Janaki & Chorus	5:02
2.	"Devi Durga Devi"	C. Narayana Reddy	S. P. Balasubrahmanyam, Vani Jayaram	5:23
3.	"Vandha Roopayala Notu"	C. Narayana Reddy	S. P. Sailaja & Chorus	4:34
4.	"Divi Daarula (Poem)"	Sirivennela Seetharama Sastry	S. P. Balasubrahmanyam	1:33
5.	"Manase Paadenule"	C. Narayana Reddy	S. P. Balasubrahmanyam & Chorus	3:32
6.	"Thillana (Dhim Tharana)"	C. Narayana Reddy	S. P. Balasubrahmanyam, S. P. Sailaja	3:08
7.	"Vevelaa Varnaala"	Sirivennela Seetharama Sastry	S. P. Balasubrahmanyam & Chorus	2:56
8.	"Kaliki Menilo"	C. Narayana Reddy	S. P. Balasubrahmanyam, S. Janaki	4:19
9.	"Gaanam Aagipodhule"	C. Narayana Reddy	S. P. Balasubrahmanyam & Chorus	4:30
10.	"Yenaavadi Ye Theeramo"	Acharya Aatreya	K. J. Yesudas	4:27
11.	"Omkaara Vaakyam"	Sirivennela Seetharama Sastry	S. P. Balasubrahmanyam, S. Janaki	0:51
Total length:				38:45

Tamil (dubbed)
No.	Title	Singer(s)	Length
1.	"Vaanmele"	Mano, K. S. Chitra	3:32
2.	"Devi Durga Devi"	Mano, K. S. Chithra	4:21
3.	"Om Om"	Vani Jairam & S. P. Balasubrahmanyam	1:25
4.	"Evan Kangalil Kalandha"	Mano	1:46
5.	"Vaa Vaa Kanmai"	Mano, K. S. Chithra	5:10
6.	"Nooruruba"	K. S. Chitra	4:35
7.	"Manasepaadiyade"	Mano	5:44
8.	"Keerthana"	Mano	4:57
Total length:			31:30

== Accolades ==
- Nandi Award for Best First Film of a Director – Geetha Krishna
