= Kallu Kondoru Pennu =

2000 Malayalam action crime film

- Directed by: Shyamaprasad
- Written by: S. L. Puram Sadanandan; T. A. Razzaq; Sasidharan Arattuvazhi
- Produced by: G. Jayakumar
- Starring: Vijayshanti; Dileep; Ajay Pradeep; Suresh Gopi
- Narrated by: Mohanlal
- Cinematography: P. Sukumar; Ramachandra Babu; Salu George; Saroj S. Padi
- Edited by: B. Lenin; V. T. Vijayan
- Music by: Ilaiyaraaja
- Release date: 29 September 1998
- Country: India
- Language: Malayalam

Kallu Kondoru Pennu is a 1998 Indian Malayalam action crime drama film directed by Shyamaprasad (in his directorial debut). starring Dileep, Baby Ajay Pradeep and Vijayashanti. This story is about an unmarried nurse (Vijayashanthi) from Kuwait City who adopts a baby kid (Ajay Pradeep).

== Plot ==
Kallu Kondoru Pennu tells us the story of nurse Sita, who toils hard in the Gulf for the sake of her family consisting of two brothers and a sister. It is her family which is above everything for her and for this she even tries to forget the love that she has for Dr. Suresh, who works with her in the same hospital and who too loves her sincerely.

At home in Kerala, her elder brother Haridasan and his wife Pankajam along with their children, her sister Raji and her younger brother Venu all are leading a comfortable life, all with the money that she sends home. It is Sita herself who is consulted by all in all matters including the marriage of her sister, which is to take place with Mohanachandran, whose main demand as part of the dowry is a visa which could help him go to the Gulf and earn money though he has a good government job here.

It is when Sita starts for home in connection with her sister's marriage that war breaks out in the Gulf and for some days the whereabouts of Sita are unknown. A few days later, a photograph of Sita holding a child in her hands appears in the newspapers with the caption "A mother and child in a refugee camp". This sets tongues wagging and finally when Sita arrives, that too with a child in her arms, she finds that life has changed a lot for here.

== Cast ==
- Vijayshanti as Sita Kumari
- Ajay Pradeep as Baby Appu
- Dileep as Venu
- Suresh Gopi as Dr. Suresh (Extended Cameo Appearance)
- Chithra as Pankajam
- Maniyanpilla Raju as Mohanachandran
- Chandni Shaju as Raji
- Rajan P. Dev as Sreekandan
- Harisree Ashokan as Atom bomb Antappan
- M. S. Thripunithura as Anandakuttan Ammavan
- K. P. Ummer as Dr. Suresh's father
- Mammukkoya as Kabeer
- Reena as Dr. Suresh's sister
- Keerthana as Deepa
- Murali as Haridasan
- Vinayan as Journalist (Cameo Uncut Old Version )
- Ravindran C.P as Journalist
- Kalabhavan Narayankutty as Marriage Broker
- Manuraj as Bike rider, sexually abusing Person Sita
- Dileep Sankar as Anthappans Friend
- V. P. Ramachandran as Brother-in-law
- M.K Babu as Gym Trainer
- Babu Sebastian as Antappan's Friend
- Sathyanarayanan as Dr. Nooruddin
- Geethsadanandan as Ambika
- Neeraja as Munnu
- Anju as Chinnu
- Kutthattukulam Vasanthi as Women In Hospital
- Bindu Madhavi as Mrs. Nooruddin

'Voice appearance'

- Mohanlal as Narrator voice only Theatre Version

== Soundtrack ==
All songs were composed by Ilaiyaraaja and written by O. N. V. Kurup

1. "Aruthe (Diganthangal Thorum)" - KJ Yesudas
2. "Thithaaram Thayaaram (male)" - MG Sreekumar
3. "Kenu Mayangeeyo" - KS Chithra
4. "Manimaaran" - Mano
5. "Thithaaram Thayaaram (duet)" - KS Chithra, MG Sreekumar
6. "Kallu Kondoru" - N/A
7. "Guru Brahma (Slokam)" - KS Chithra
8. "Janichenna Paapam" - KJ Yesudas, Chorus
