= Sreedhar =

Indian Telugu film actor (1939–2007)

- Born: Sreedhar Surapaneni; 1939; Kummamuru, Krishna district, Andhra Pradesh, India
- Died: 11 July 2007 (aged 68)
- Occupation: Actor
- Years active: 1974–2005
- Children: 3

Sreedhar (Note: Also spelled Sridhar) (born Sreedhar Surapaneni; 1939–2007) was an Indian actor who worked in Telugu films. He started acting in small roles in early 1970s. He became popular with Mutyala Muggu in 1975 directed by Bapu. He played heroes, villains and supporting characters in over 150 films.

== Personal life ==
Sreedhar was born and brought up in Kummamuru, Krishna district, Andhra Pradesh. He had three daughters with wife. He died on 11 July 2007 in Hyderabad from a cardiac arrest.

== Filmography ==
List of Sreedhar film credits
Year	Title	Role	Notes
1970	Suguna Sundari Katha	Panchala Raju	Uncredited
1971	Rowdilaku Rowdilu		Guest role
1971	C I D Raju	Police Inspector	
1972	Sabhash Papanna		
1973	Minor Babu		
1973	Visali		
1974	Mangalya bhagyam	Bhasker	
1974	Alluri Seetarama Raju		
1974	Chakravakam	Diwakar	
1974	Devadasu		
1975	Mutyala Muggu		
1975	Yashoda Krishna	Vasudeva	
1975	Sri Ramanjaneya Yuddham	Bharata	
1976	Bhakta Kannappa		
1976	America Ammayi		
1976	Oka Ammayi Katha		
1976	Velugu Baatalu		
1976	Bangaru Manishi		
1976	Monagadu	Srinivasa Rao	
1977	Adavi Ramudu	Jaggu	
1977	Brathuke Oka Panduga		
1977	Taram Marindi		
1977	Palleseema		
1977	Manavadikosam	Sridhar	
1977	Seetha Geetha Datithe		
1978	Indradhanussu	'Kavi' Janardhana	
1978	Bommarillu		
1978	Sri Rama Pattabhishekam	Guhudu	
1978	Swarga Seema		
1978	Mallepoovu		
1978	Dongala Dopidi	Sundaram	
1978	Karunamayudu		
1978	Seetamalakshmi		
1978	Kaliyuga Ravanaasurudu		
1978	Akbar Salim Anarkali		
1978	Gorantha Deepam		
1979	Driver Ramudu	Inspector Raja Reddy	
1979	Seethe Ramudaithe	Dr. Krishna	
1979	Judagadu		
1979	Bottu Katuka		
1979	Angadi Bomma		
1979	Naa Illu Naa Vallu		
1980	Podarillu		
1980	Bangaru Bava	Madanmohan	
1980	Kodalu Vastunaru Jagratha	Vasu	
1980	Mayadari Krishnudu		
1980	Aadaddi Gadapa Daatithe		
1980	Samsarabandham		
1980	Moogaku Matosthe		
1980	Manchini Penchali		
1980	Sandhya		
1981	Jathara	Shankaram	
1981	Agni Poolu		
1981	Devudu Mavayya		
1982	Justice Chowdary	Inspector Raja	
1982	Eenadu		
1982	Aapadbandhavulu		
1982	Krishnavatharam		
1983	Kirayi Kotigadu	Rambabu	
1983	Santoshimata Vrata Mahatyam		
1983	Magallako Namaskaram		
1983	Andhra Kesari		
1984	Kanchu Kagada	Raju	
1985	Khooni	Sarath	
1985	Kongumudi	Suryam	
1985	Maharaju		
1986	Prathibhavanthudu	Suresh	
1986	Seetharama Kalyanam		
1987	Dongodochadu	Lakshmi Devi's husband	
1987	Punya Dampathulu		
1987	Kirai Dada	Koti	
1988	Chinnodu Peddodu		
1990	Neti Charitra	Principal	
1990	Prananiki Pranam	Jayanti Devi's husband	
1990	Mahajananiki Maradalu Pilla	Narayana Rao	
1990	Ayyappa Swamy Janma Rahasyam		
1990	Kondaveeti Donga		
1994	Govinda Govinda		
