= Krishnavataram =

1982 Telugu action drama by Bapu

- Poster
- Directed by: Bapu
- Written by: Mullapudi Venkata Ramana
- Produced by: Mullapudi Venkata Ramana
- Starring: Krishna Ghattamaneni; Sridevi; Vijayashanti
- Cinematography: Baba Azmi
- Music by: K. V. Mahadevan
- Production company: Chitra Kalpana Films
- Release date: 22 September 1982
- Country: India
- Language: Telugu

Krishnavataram (transl. The Krishna Incarnation) is a 1982 Indian Telugu-language action drama film directed by Bapu starring Krishna Ghattamaneni, Sridevi and Vijayashanti. Produced by Mullapudi Venkata Ramana, the film had musical score by K. V. Mahadevan.

== Cast ==
- Krishna as Kishtayya
- Sridevi as Gowri
- Vijayashanti as Shanti
- Ramana Murthy as Jagannatham
- Sreedhar
- P. R. Varalakshmi
- K. Vijaya
- Prasad Babu as Gopal
- Vallam Narasimha Rao
- Bhimaraju

=== Guest appearance ===
- Kantha Rao
- Allu Ramalingaiah
- Rallapalli

== Soundtrack ==
Krishnavataram

Soundtrack album
- Genre: Feature film soundtrack
- Language: Telugu
- Label: Saregama India Limited

The soundtrack album comprised 5 songs all of which were composed by K. V. Mahadevan.

1. "Intlo Eegala Motta" — S. P. Balasubrahmanyam, P. Susheela
2. "Konda Gogu Chettu" — S.P.B., P. Susheela
3. "Sinnari Navvu" — S.P.B., S. P. Sailaja
4. "Melukoraada Krishna" — S.P.B., P. Susheela, S. P. Shailaja
5. "Swagatham Guru" — S.P.B.
