= Chinarayudu =

- Theatrical release poster
- Directed by: B. Gopal
- Written by: Paruchuri Brothers(dialogues)
- Story by: R. Selvaraj
- Based on: Chinna Gounder
- Produced by: P. R. Prasad
- Starring: Venkatesh; Vijayashanti
- Cinematography: V. S. R. Swamy
- Edited by: Kotagiri Venkateswara Rao
- Music by: Ilaiyaraaja
- Production company: Sri Datta Sai Films
- Release date: 7 August 1992
- Running time: 141 minutes
- Country: India
- Language: Telugu

Chinarayudu is a 1992 Indian Telugu-language drama film directed by B. Gopal and produced by P. R. Prasad under Datta Sai Films. It stars Venkatesh and Vijayashanti playing the lead roles, with music composed by Ilaiyaraaja. The film was a remake of the Tamil film Chinna Gounder.

== Plot ==
Chinnarayudu is the arbitrator and the most respected person in a village and sees to it that all the people live happily. Whenever injustice comes to the fore, he appears to resolve it in an authentic manner. He resolves agriculture issues as people in the village grow crops and fish in small ponds. He lives with his mother Durgamma. Chinnarayudu's brother-in-law Pasupathi is his rival.

Gowri, a girl in the village, lives by rearing the goats. While Chinna Rayudu is walking through the village. Some children complained that Gowri had grabbed their spinning top, they asked him to take it back from her. He went to talk to her, but she bets a spinning top game spinning. The challenge was that the losers will lay down and the spinning top to spin around on their belly. He runs away by afraiding that she'll spin the top on his belly, and she jokes that you will come tomorrow to play the game.That day he learned to spin the top. Then he wins the next day's spinning top game by defeating Gowri. She returns the spinning tops to the children and tries to escape the punishment. But Rayudu and the children were surrounded. Laying her down, he leave his spinning top to spin around on her belly. She screams in embarrassment, and then the spinning top whirled into the navel and keeps spinning there, which tickled her so much. Her funny fights with Chinnarayudu and they both silently love each other. Gowri has a debt of a large amount to Pasupathi for educating her sister Ganga; she is not able to repay the money, so the issue goes to Chinnarayudu's judgment, then a situation arises; Gowri has to collect money from the villagers for repaying her debt and ultimately marries Chinnarayudu.

After some time, in an auction, Chinnarayudu loses to Pasupathi, bearing a grudge, Pasupathi puts poison in a fish lake and puts the blame on Chinnarayudu. Prakash Rao, is a person who was brought up and educated by Chinnarayudu, but he feels that he has been insulted him many times, so he prepares to give evidence against Chinnarayudu. Gowri learns of it, she pleads with him, but at last, she doesn't have any other alternative to stopping him, except to kill him with an axe. Gowri has been sent to remand and the case is under judgment.

Meanwhile, Ganga becomes pregnant; Chinnarayudu takes the blame on himself and for that, Durgamma sends him out of the house. In jail, Gowri attempts suicide. Chinnarayudu meets her in the hospital and reveals the truth: "the person who made Ganga pregnant is none other than Prakash Rao, no one will believe this, that's why he took the blame", then Gowri realizes it. At the same time, Chinnarayudu learns that Prakash Rao did not die since Gowri hit him with an axe and after that, Pasupathi killed him. Chinnarayudu proves this and makes Gowri realize it. Ganga gives birth to a baby, she also tells the truth to everyone and dies. Chinnarayudu catches Pasupathi and gets him to the panchayat (town council); he also realizes his mistake and surrenders himself to the police.

== Cast ==
- Venkatesh as Chinnarayudu
- Vijayashanti as Gowri
- Kota Srinivasa Rao as Chakali Appanna
- Babu Mohan as Appanna's assistant
- P. L. Narayana as Lawyer
- Mohan Raj as Pasupathi
- Vinod as Prakash Rao
- Narra Venkateswara Rao as Doctor
- Jeet Mohan Mitra as Lawyer
- Vijayalalitha as Kameswari
- Rajitha as Chinnarayudu's niece
- Haritha as Ganga
- Nirmalamma as Durgamma
- Ironleg Sastri

== Production ==
the film was shot in Gobichettipalayam.

== Soundtrack ==
Chinarayudu

Soundtrack album by Ilaiyaraaja
- Released: 1992
- Genre: Soundtrack
- Length: 30:27
- Label: Lahari Music
- Producer: Ilaiyaraaja

Ilaiyaraaja chronology
Chanti (1992)	Chinarayudu (1992)	Aswamedham (1992)

Music composed by Ilaiyaraaja. Lyrics were written by Bhuvanachandra. Music released on Lahari Music Company.

No.	Title	Singer(s)	Length
1.	"Bullipitta (Version l)"	S. Janaki, S. P. Balasubrahmanyam	4:52
2.	"Swathi Mutyamala"	K. S. Chithra, S. P. Balasubrahmanyam	5:02
3.	"Chitti Chitti"	S. P. Balasubrahmanyam	5:06
4.	"Kanti Chupu"	S. P. Balasubrahmanyam	4:22
5.	"Cheppalanundi Sundari"	S. P. Balasubrahmanyam	0:47
6.	"Nindu Aakasamantha (Female)"	K. S. Chithra	1:14
7.	"Bullipitta (Version ll)"	K. S. Chithra, S. P. Balasubrahmanyam	4:21
8.	"Nindu Aakasamantha (Male)"	S. P. Balasubrahmanyam	4:35
Total length:			30:27
