= Neti Bharatam =

- Movie poster
- Directed by: T. Krishna
- Written by: M. V. S. Haranatha Rao (Dialogues)
- Screenplay by: T. Krishna
- Produced by: P. Venkateswara Rao
- Starring: Suman; Vijayshanti; Nagabhushanam
- Music by: K. Chakravarthy
- Release date: 15 October 1983
- Country: India
- Language: Telugu

Neti Bharatam is a 1983 film written and directed by T. Krishna and produced by Eetharam Films. Suman and Vijayashanti played lead roles, with Nagabhushanam and Rajyalakshmi in assisting roles. It is a musical hit film promoting liberal ideals. Lyrics for the songs were written by revolutionary poet Srirangam Srinivasa Rao, Adrushta Deepak, and music scored by K. Chakravarthy. The movie is most famous for the song "Maanavatvam Parimalinche", which got the lyricist Adrushta Deepak noticed.

The film was remade in Kannada as Indina Bharatha (1983), Hindi as Haqeeqat (1985) and in Tamil as Puthiya Theerpu (1985). The film won six Nandi Awards.

== Cast ==
- Suman
- Vijayshanti
- Nagabhushanam
- P. L. Narayana
- Narra Venkateswara Rao
- Rallapalli
- Chalapathi Rao
- P. J. Sharma
- Rajeev
- Kalpana Rai
- Rajyalakshmi
- S. Varalakshmi

== Soundtrack ==
Music by K. Chakravarthy.

- "Ardharatri Swatantram Andhakaara Bandhuram" (Lyrics: Sri Sri)
- "Chitti Potti"
- "Dammu Thoti Daggu Thoti Chalijoramoste" (Lyrics: B. Krishna Murthy)
- "Manavatvam Parimalinche Manchi Manasuku Swagatam" (Lyrics: Adrushta Deepak)

== Awards ==
Filmfare Awards South

- Filmfare Best Film Award (Telugu) - P. Venkateswara Rao.

Nandi Awards

- Second Best Feature Film - Silver - P. Venkateswara Rao.
- Best Music Director - K. Chakravarthy.
- Best Supporting Actor - P. L. Narayana.
- Best Screenplay Writer - T. Krishna
- Best First Film of a Director - T. Krishna
- Best Lyricist - Sri Sri
