= Vijaya Shanthi =

Indian actress, film producer and politician

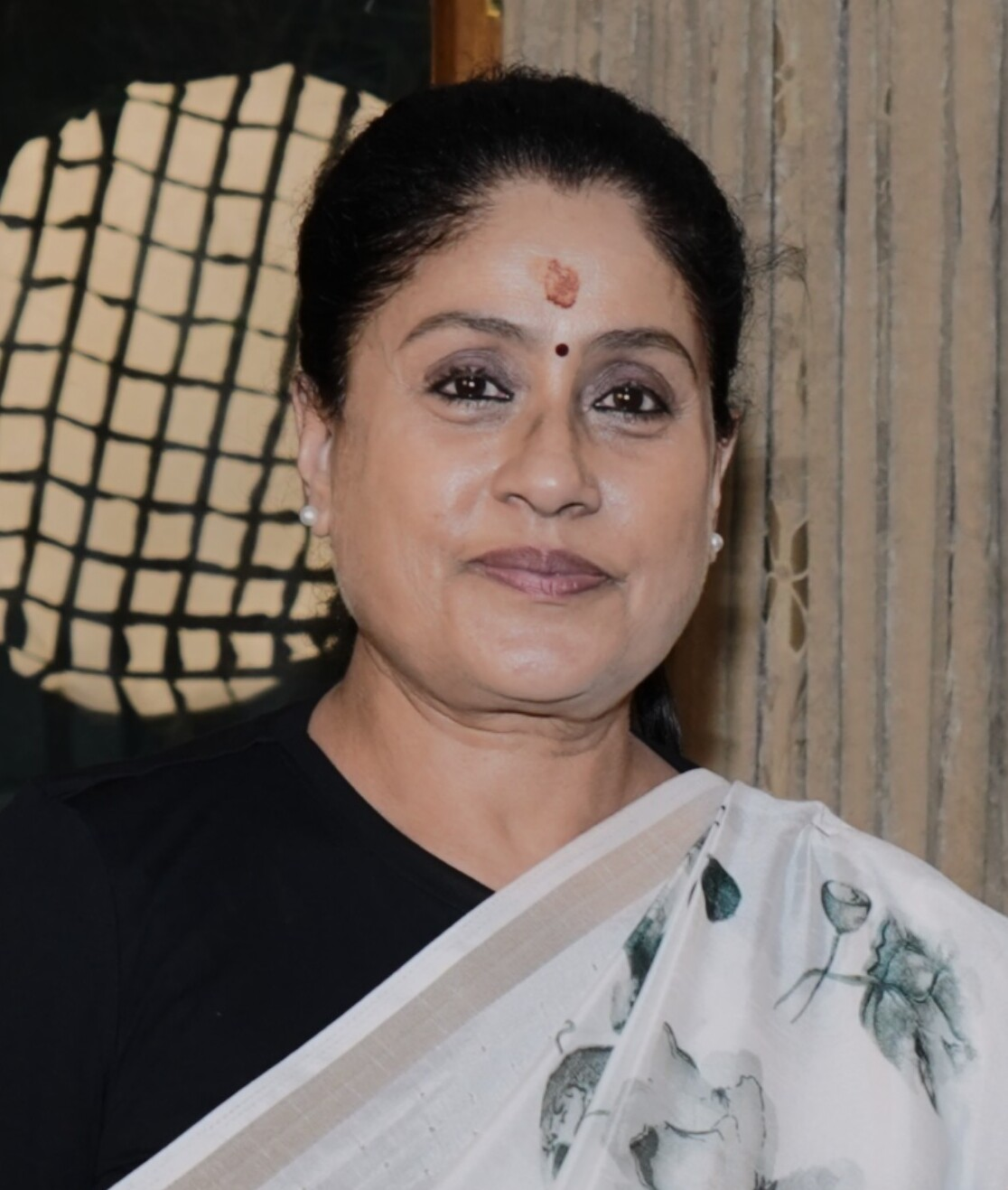
- Vijaya Shanthi at an event

Member of Legislative Council, Telangana
- Incumbent
- Assumed office 30 March 2025
- Constituency: Elected by MLAs

Member of Parliament, Lok Sabha
- In office 2009–2014
- Preceded by: A. Narendra
- Succeeded by: Kotha Prabhakar Reddy
- Constituency: Medak

Personal details
- Born: Satti Vijaya Shanthi; 24 June 1966 (age 60) Madras, Madras State, India
- Party: Indian National Congress (2014–2020; 2023–present)
- Other political affiliations: Talli Telangana Party (2005–2009); Bharat Rashtra Samithi (2009–2014); Bharatiya Janata Party (1998–2005; 2020–2023)
- Spouse: Moturi Venkata Srinivasa Prasad (m. 1988)
- Occupation: Actress, film producer, politician

Moturi Vijaya Shanthi (born 24 June 1966) is an Indian actress, film producer and politician. In a film career spanning 40 years, she has acted in 200 feature films in a variety of roles in various languages predominantly in Telugu films, in addition to Tamil, Hindi, Kannada, and Malayalam films. She is widely referred to as the "Lady Superstar", "Lady Amitabh" and "Action Queen of Telugu Cinema". Vijayashanti holds the record for the most "Industry Hits" in Telugu cinema for a heroine, with five films emerging as the top-grossers of their time—a feat unmatched by any actress in the industry's 100-year history. She won the National Film Award for Best Actress for her work as a female cop in Kartavyam for depicting both aggression and femininity with balance and restraint (1990). She is a recipient of several accolades, including four Andhra Pradesh state Nandi Awards for Best Actress, seven Filmfare Awards South together with a Lifetime Achievement Award in 2003, and the Kalaimamani Award from Tamil Nadu Government.

Having made her acting debut in the Tamil film Kallukkul Eeram (1980), she went on to star in successful films like Netrikkan (1981), Neti Bharatam (1983), Agni Parvatam (1985), Challenge (1984), Pratighatana (1985), Muddula Krishnayya (1986), Repati Pourulu (1986), Pasivadi Pranam (1987), Muvva Gopaludu (1987), Yamudiki Mogudu (1988), Athaku Yamudu Ammayiki Mogudu (1989), Janaki Ramudu (1988), Muddula Mavayya (1989), Kondaveeti Donga (1990), Karthavyam (1990), Indrudu Chandrudu (1989), Lorry Driver (1990), Sathruvu (1990), Gang Leader (1991), Mannan (1992), Rowdy Inspector (1992), Mondi Mogudu Penki Pellam (1992), Chinarayudu (1993) and Police Lockup (1993), Osey Ramulamma (1997). Vijaya Shanthi had established herself as one of the leading actresses of Telugu cinema. In 1987, she appeared in Swayam Krushi alongside Chiranjeevi, which was screened at the Moscow International Film Festival, and Padamati Sandhya Ragam with Hollywood actor Thomas Jane, which was screened at the Louisville International Film Festival.

She entered state politics in 1998. She served as the Member of Parliament in the 15th Lok Sabha, representing the Medak constituency from Telangana Rashtra Samithi. As of November 2023, she is a member of the Indian National Congress.

== Early life ==
Vijaya Shanthi was born on 24 June 1966 in Madras/Chennai to Satti Srinivasa Prasad, and his wife, Satti Varalakshmi, and her elder sister actress and producer Vijayalalitha.

She completed her 10th class at Holy Angels Anglo Indian Higher Secondary School, Chennai, before starting her film career.

== Film career ==
=== Early career (1980-1982) ===
Vijaya Shanthi began her acting career at the age of 14 in 1980, Tamil film Kallukkul Eeram, directed by Bharathiraja. In the same year, she debuted in Telugu cinema with the movie Kilaadi Krishnudu, opposite Krishna, directed by Vijaya Nirmala. She got a role in the Telugu film Satyam-Sivam (1981), the cast of which included N. T. Rama Rao and Akkineni Nageswara Rao.

=== Balance of glamour and women-centric roles (1983–1993) ===
Initially she played many character role like sister, daughter and then after a couple of inconsequential movies came Pellichoopulu (1983), which brought recognition to her as a star. This was a remake of K. Bhagyaraj's Tamil film Thooral Ninnu Pochchu. Her breakthrough movie was Neti Bharatam (1983), and from there she started acting in women-centric roles, teaming up with T. Krishna. He spotted her on the sets of his friend Madala Rangarao's Navodayam. He saw her perform and predicted that she would turn out to be a good actress. In 1985, Pratighatana, one of the biggest blockbusters of the year, won her accolades and a state Nandi Award for the first time. She delivered a powerful performance in the song "Ee Dhuryodhana Dusshasana", penned by legendary lyricist Veturi and powerfully sung by S. Janaki. In K. Viswanath's Swayam Krushi, where she acts as an illiterate woman who falls in love with a cobbler. Her dialogue "Atta Soodamakayya" is highly applauded along with her performance in Swayam Krushi.

In 1992 Mondi Mogudu Penki Pellam was a huge success. Vijaya Shanthi played a bold lady speaking Telangana slang and delivered the career-defining song "Laloo Darwaja Laskar". In 1994 it was remade into Hindi as Meri Biwi Ka Jawab Nahin. In the 1990s, Vijayashanti was the highest-paid heroine in India and her remuneration was equal to her co-stars Rajinikanth and Amitabh Bachchan. Her collaboration with Chiranjeevi (19 films) and Nandamuri Balakrishna (17 films) were huge hits at the box office. She starred alongside Rajinikanth as the antagonist in the film Mannan, and with Kamal Haasan as an investigative reporter in Indrudu Chandrudu. She acted in two movies with Suresh Gopi, Yuvathurki and Kallu Kondoru Pennu. She produced the film Nippu Ravva (1993), starring Balakrishna, under the banner Yuvarathna Arts.

=== Hindi cinema (1989–1997) ===
In 1989, she was introduced to Hindi cinema by K. Viswanath alongside Anil Kapoor in the film Eeshwar, a remake of his Telugu film Swathi Muthyam. Her second Hindi film was Muqaddar Ka Badshaah, a remake of the Telugu film Aswaddama. In the Hindi version, she acted with another National Award-winning actress - Shabana Azmi. Her other starrers are Apradhi, in which she is co-starring with Anil Kapoor and Tejaswini, a remake of Karthavyam, directed by N. Chandra. Another Bollywood movie of hers is Gundagardi (1997), starring Dharmendra in an action role. In 1996, she was paired opposite Amitabh Bachchan in Zamaanat, directed by S. Ramanathan, but the film was shelved.

=== National Award and woman-oriented roles (1990–2006) ===
In a carefully nurtured career, Vijayashanthi reached the status of a "HERO" at box office parlance. In the blockbuster movie Karthavyam (1990), her performance as a tough cop under the direction of Mohan Gandhi won her the National Film Award from the Government of India and an Andhra Pradesh State award for best actress. Actor Ravi Teja was introduced in the film as a side artist. The film was made with a budget of about 90 lakh rupees and grossed over 7 crores in southern territories alone. The film was screened at the 14th International Film Festival of India in the mainstream section. She was the third woman from Telugu cinema to win the award after Sharada and Archana.

The success of this movie saw her moving away from glamorous roles and limiting herself to woman-oriented roles. "There were people who questioned how can a Heroine attain the image of Hero & charge highest remuneration. But, I had overcome all the hurdles and answered critics with successful films," she answered.

Vijaya Shanthi didn't rely on stunt doubles for performing risky stunts in many films. There were times when she jumped from a height of 30 feet and she hardly cared about the injuries.

In 1990, Karthavyam was dubbed into Tamil as Vyjayanthi IPS and its success brought her fame in Tamil cinema. (It was also remade in Hindi as Tejaswini, with herself playing the lead role. This, too, did very well at the Hindi box office.) The film inspired the then 10-year old C. Indhumathi to take up the civil services exam; she cleared the UPSC exam and bagged 151st rank and placed in Madurai. Vyjayanthi IPS ran for 50 days in Vetri theater in Chennai. This record was broken by a dubbed version of Baahubali in August 2015.

A. M. Ratnam, Vijaya Shanthi's personal make-up man, turned out to be a money-making producer. As an executive producer for Vijaya Shanthi, he made the award-winning Karthavyam on the banner of Sri Surya Movies. On the same banner, she produced and acted in Aashayam released in 1993, which had a decent run. In Police Lockup she played a dual role, directed by Kodi Ramakrishna, for which she won another Filmfare Award for Best Actress – Telugu. Later she continued her career in action roles. In Osey Ramulamma (1997), she played a downtrodden woman who rose against her oppressors. Directed by Dasari Narayana Rao, this was the biggest blockbuster of the year, giving Vijaya Shanthi her fourth Nandi Award and sixth Filmfare Award for Best Actress – Telugu. This film gave her another name, called as "Ramulamma/Ramulakka" by the people. The music of this film, composed by Vandemataram Srinivas, also won the Nandi Award.

Later, she appeared in women oriented movies like Adavi Chukka and Rowdy Durbar, directed by Dasari Narayana Rao.

Vijayashanthi has also worked for many commercials like Chandana Bros., and Power Detergent soap. She was the first actress to be first featured in a saree commercial.

=== Comeback into films (2019–present) ===
Vijaya Shanthi returned to cinema after a sabbatical of 13 years, starring in the 2020 film Sarileru Neekevvaru where Mahesh Babu played the main protagonist.

Her last seen movie is Nayudamma, released in 2006. Anil Ravipudi shared a welcome picture on Twitter on 12 August 2019 announcing her return to films with a makeup mirror placed in front of her. He wrote "After 13 years.. It's make up time for Vijayashanthi garu.. Nothing has ever changed in all these 13 years. Same discipline, same attitude and same dynamism. Welcome on-board". She was paid four crores for her re-entry film Sarileru Neekevvaru. 2025 marks her second re-entry film Arjun Son of Vyjayanthi is scheduled to release on April 18, herself starring in a powerful cop role alongside Nandamuri Kalyan Ram.

== Political career (1998–present) ==
In 1998, Vijaya Shanthi joined the Bharatiya Janata Party and was soon made the secretary of BJP's Women's Wing (Bharateeya Mahila Morcha). In 1998, her first public meeting was held at Nellore, a big hit in support of BJP. During the 1999 general election she was named BJP's contestant from the Kadapa Lok Sabha seat against Sonia Gandhi of Congress(I). However, she withdrew from the race after Sonia Gandhi decided to contest from Bellary. In 1996, Vijaya Shanthi, who is pro-BJP, vowed her support to the All India Anna Dravida Munnetra Kazhagam (AIADMK), and was a star campaigner for then Chief Jayalalithaa. Vijayashanti is the star campaigner for BJP Lok Sabha Polls in Tamil Nadu along with Cricketer Srikkanth.

She started her own political party, Talli Telangana, in January 2005, which she merged into Bharat Rashtra Samithi (BRS) due to lack of strength and support. From 1999, her movie appearances decreased as she focused on her political career. By 2004, she had stopped signing up for new films. In the 2009 general election, she won as a Member of Parliament from the Medak constituency from BRS. In June 2009, she resigned from the post of secretary general of BRS, expressing solidarity with the resignation of Kalvakuntla Chandrashekar Rao.

In 2011, she submitted her resignation as an MP along with Kalvakuntla Chandrashekar Rao in agitation of Telangana movement. The resignation was later rejected by the speaker of the house, as it was not in the proper format. Later, she actively participated in politics for separate Telangana State (region), in which she played a key role.

Vijaya Shanthi joined the Indian National Congress party in February 2014 after a split with TRS chief KCR. She contested in the assembly elections from Medak in the 2014 general elections from Indian National Congress party and lost as MLA. After some inactive years, in 2018 AICC president Rahul Gandhi appointed Vijaya Shanthi as star campaigner and adviser to the election campaign committee of Telangana PCC.

Vijaya Shanthi in March 2019, started a controversy after she compared Narendra Modi to a terrorist and claimed he was "ruling like a dictator". She made these statements at a rally in Telangana's Shamshabad village in Ranga Reddy district. Vijaya Shanthi said, "He is appearing like a terrorist. Instead of loving his people, he is scaring them. And said this is not a characteristic of a prime minister.

She resigned from the Congress in November 2020 and rejoined the Bharatiya Janata Party on 6 December 2020 in the presence of Home Minister Amit Shah.

In November 2023, she left BJP and rejoined Congress on 17 November 2023, in the presence of Congress president, Mallikarjun Kharge.

She was unanimously Elected as Member of Telangana Legislative Council on 13 March 2025.

On April 7, 2025, Vijaya Shanti has taken oath as elected Member of Legislative Council (MLC) from Congress along with Addanki Dayakar and Shankar Nayak.

== Electoral History ==
=== Legislative Assembly Elections ===
Year	Constituency	Party	Votes	%	Opponent	Party	Votes	%	Result	Margin	%

=== Lok Sabha Elections ===
Year	Constituency	Party	Votes	%	Opponent	Party	Votes	%	Result	Margin	%

== Personal life ==
Vijaya Shanthi is married to Moturi Venkata Srinivasa Prasad in 1988. He does real estate business around Chennai and Hyderabad. He is a nephew to Daggubati Purandeswari.

== Awards and honours ==
Year	Award	Award category	Awarded work	Ref.
1990	National Film Awards	Best Actress	Kartavyam	
2002	Tamil Nadu State Awards	Kalaimamani Award	Art - Contribution to Tamil Cinema Industry	
1985	Filmfare Awards South	Best Actress – Telugu	Pratighatana	
1987	Filmfare Awards South	Best Actress – Telugu	Swayamkrushi	
1989	Filmfare Awards South	Best Actress – Telugu	Bharathanaari	
1990	Filmfare Awards South	Best Actress – Telugu	Kartavyam	
1993	Filmfare Awards South	Best Actress – Telugu	Police Lockup	
1997	Filmfare Awards South	Best Actress – Telugu	Osey Ramulamma	
2003	Filmfare Awards South	Lifetime Achievement Award (South)	Contribution to South Indian Film Industry	
1985	Nandi Awards	Nandi Award for Best Actress	Pratighatana	
1989	Nandi Awards	Nandi Award for Best Actress	Bharathanaari	
1990	Nandi Awards	Nandi Award for Best Actress	Kartavyam	
1997	Nandi Awards	Nandi Award for Best Actress	Osey Ramulamma	
1997	Cinema Express Awards	Best Telugu Actress	Osey Ramulamma	
2010	TSR-TV9 Awards	Silver Screen Empress Award	Contribution to Indian Cinema	

== Filmography ==
=== Telugu films ===
Year	Film	Role	Notes
1980	Khiladi Krishnudu		Debut in Telugu
1981	Satyam Shivam	Shanti	
1981	Pandanti Jeevitham		
1982	Pelleedu Pillalu	Santhi	
1982	Vamsha Gouravam	Sasi	
1982	Prathikaram		
1982	Krishnavataram		
1983	Sri Ranga Neethulu	Lakshmi	
1983	Rakasi Loya		
1983	Pelli Choopulu		
1983	Neti Bharatam		Nominated-Filmfare Award for Best Actress – Telugu
1983	Mukku Pudaka		
1983	Navodayam		
1983	Sangharshana	Radha	
1983	Amaayaka Chakra Varthy		
1983	Pelli Chesi Chupistam		
1983	Dharmaatmudu	Shanthi	
1984	Devanthakudu		
1984	Pandanti Kaapuraniki Pannendu Suthralu	Jaya	
1984	Sundari Subbarao		
1984	S. P. Bhayankar	Lakshmi	
1984	Mahanagaramlo Mayagadu		
1984	Challenge	Haarika	
1984	Abhimanyudu		
1984	Ee Charithra Inkennallu	Satyavathi	
1984	Jadagantalu		
1984	Raaraju		
1984	Dongallo Dora		
1984	Veerabhadhrudu		
1984	Adadhani Sawal		
1984	Kutumba Gouravam		
1984	Kurra Cheshtalu		
1984	Kathanayakudu		
1985	Vande Mataram		
1985	Pattabhishekam	Hema	
1985	Kottha Pelli Kuthuru		
1985	Bhandhi		
1985	Devalayam		
1985	Desamlo Dongalupaddaru		
1985	Agni Parvatam	Vijaya	
1985	Thirugubaatu		
1985	Chiranjeevi	Lalitha	
1985	Darja Donga		
1985	Ooriki Soggadu	Radha	
1985	Srivaru	Gayathri	
1985	Pratighatana	Jhansi	
1986	Muddula Krishnaiah	Vijaya	
1986	Apoorva Sahodarulu		
1986	Sakkanodu		
1986	Sravana Sandhya	Sravani	
1986	Naaga Devata	Lakshmi	
1986	Kondaveeti Raja	Rani	
1986	Chanakya Shapadham		
1986	Repati Pourulu	Saraswathi	
1986	Dhairyavanthudu	Lavanya	
1986	Brahmasthram		
1986	Samaajamlo Stree	Karuna	
1986	Aruna Kiranam	Aruna	
1986	Samsaaram Oka Sangeetam		
1986	Jeevana Poratam		
1986	Deshoddharakudu		
1987	Sahasa Samrat	Rani	
1987	Muvva Gopaludu	Nirmala	
1987	Pasivadi Pranam	Geetha	
1987	Dongagaru Swagatam		
1987	Swayam Krushi	Ganga	
1987	Trimurtulu		Cameo
1987	Muddayi		
1987	Bhanumati Gari Mogudu	Bhanumati	
1987	Kalyana Thambhulam		
1987	Bhargava Ramudu	Latha	
1987	Padamati Sandhya Ragam	Sandhya	Nominated-Filmfare Award for Best Actress – Telugu
1987	Sardar Krishnama Naidu		
1988	Janaki Ramudu	Janaki/Lakshmi	Nominated-Filmfare Award for Best Actress – Telugu
1988	Manchi Donga	Vijaya	
1988	Yuddha Bhoomi	Kumari	
1988	Yamudiki Mogudu	Gowri	
1988	Aswadhdhaama		
1988	Donga Pelli	Shanti	
1988	Inspector Pratap		
1989	Muddula Mavayya	Radha	
1989	Indrudu Chandrudu	Reporter Durga	
1989	Athaku Yamudu Ammayiki Mogudu	Sasi Rekha	
1989	Rudranetra	Pratima	
1989	Dorikite Dongalu	Shanti	
1989	Bharatha Naari	Bharathi	
1989	Gunda Raajyam		
1989	Koduku Diddina Kapuram	Sasi Rekha	
1989	Vijay	Latha	
1989	Bhale Donga	Rekha	
1990	Shatruvu	Vijaya	
1990	Naagaastram		
1990	Kondaveeti Donga	Srilekha	
1990	Palnaati Rudraiah		
1990	Kartavyam	Vyjayanthi IPS	
1990	Muddula Menalludu	Shanti	
1990	Lorry Driver	Jayamma	
1991	Surya IPS	Sirisha	
1991	Talli Tandrulu	Kavitha	
1991	Stuartpuram Police Station	Alakananda	
1991	Gang Leader	Kanyakumari	
1991	Jaitra Yatra	Aruna	
1992	Rowdy Inspector	Rani	Dubbed in Tamil as Auto Raani
1992	Chinarayudu	Gowri	
1992	Mondi Mogudu Penki Pellam	Ammulu / Chandrakala	
1993	Mechanic Alludu	Chitti	
1993	Police Lockup	Vijaya, Shanti	Dual roles
1993	Nippu Ravva		Also producer
1993	Aashayam	Sarojini	Also producer; dubbed in Tamil as Aasayam
1993	Kunthi Putrudu		
1994	Rowdy Mogudu		
1994	Doragaariki Donga Pellaam	Rani	
1994	Madam		
1994	Atha Kodallu		
1994	Maga Rayudu	Sudharani	
1994	Lady Boss		Dubbed in Tamil as Lady Boss
1995	Street Fighter	Ujjaini	
1997	Osey Ramulamma	Ramulamma	Dubbed in Tamil as Adimai Penn
1997	Rowdy Durbar	Yellamma, Durgi	
1998	Srivaarante Maa Vaare	Nagamani	
1999	Bharata Ratna	Vijaya / Bhavani	Also singer
2000	Sri Srimati Satyabhama	Satyabhama	
2000	Adavi Chukka	Chukkamma, Santhi	Also producer
2001	Vyjayanthi	Vyjayanthi	
2002	Saahasa Baludu Vichitra Kothi		
2002	Sambhavi IPS	Sambhavi	Dubbed in Kannada as Vijayashanthi
2002	Rifles		
2003	Sivani	Sivani	
2004	Indiramma	Indira	
2006	Naayudamma	Naayudamma, Jhansi	
2020	Sarileru Neekevvaru	Bharathi	
2025	Arjun Son Of Vyjayanthi	Vyjayanthi	

=== Tamil films ===
Year	Film	Role	Notes
1980	Kallukkul Eeram	Kaathi	Debut in Tamil
1981	Rajangam	Sathya	
1981	Netrikkann	Sangeetha	
1981	Nenjile Thunivirunthal		
1981	Sandhana Malargal		
1981	Pattam Parakkattum		
1982	Ilanjodigal	Geetha	
1982	Nizhal Thedum Nenjangal		
1982	Vedikkai Manidhargal		
1983	Neeru Pootha Neruppu		
1983	Villiyanur Matha		
1983	Thalaimagan		
1983	Kalyana Kanavugal		
1992	Mannan	Shanti Devi	
1997	Thadayam	Jyothi	Producer; dubbed into Telugu as Chattam
1999	Suryodayam	Indra	
1999	Rajasthan	Gayathri	
2002	Sri Bannari Amman	Amman	Dubbed in Telugu as Maha Chandi

=== Hindi films ===
Year	Film	Role	Notes
1989	Eeshwar	Lalitha	Debut Hindi film
1990	Muqaddar Ka Badshaah	Bharthi Rathod	
1992	Aparadhi	Paro	
1994	Tejasvini	ASP Tejasvini Joshi	Also producer
1997	Gundagardi	Deepa	

=== Kannada films ===
Year	Film	Role	Notes
1983	Keralida Hennu		
1983	Simha Gharjane	Lalitha	
2001	Vande Matharam	Gayatri	

=== Malayalam films ===
Year	Film	Role	Notes
1996	Yuvathurki		Dubbed in Telugu as Delhi Diary
1998	Kallu Kondoru Pennu	Sita	

Preceded by A. Narendra	Member of Parliament from Medak; 2009 – 2014	Succeeded by Kotha Prabhakar Reddy
