= Time (1999 film) =

- Poster
- Directed by: Geetha Krishna
- Screenplay by: Geetha Krishna
- Story by: Geetha Krishna
- Dialogues by: Gokula Krishnan Geetha Krishna
- Produced by: Vaddi Veerabadhra Rao
- Starring: Prabhu Deva; Simran; Radhika Chaudhari
- Cinematography: M. V. Panneerselvam
- Edited by: Suresh Urs
- Music by: Ilaiyaraaja
- Distributed by: Life Line Films
- Release date: 3 December 1999
- Country: India
- Language: Tamil

Time is a 1999 Indian Tamil-language romantic drama film written and directed by Geetha Krishna. The film stars Prabhu Deva, Simran and Radhika Chaudhari in the lead roles. The film was produced by Vaddi Veerabadhra Rao, with cinematography by M. V. Panneerselvam and editing by Suresh Urs. Chennai Online wrote "The locales are exotic, the frames beautiful and the costume colourful. But what the film lacks is cohesive narration". The soundtrack and background score were composed by Ilaiyaraaja. Time was released theatrically on 3 December 1999 to mixed reviews.

== Plot ==
Srinivasa Murthy is a cheerful and carefree young man who lives with his widowed mother. He spends most of his time with his close group of friends including Chittappa, Harikumar, Gopi, Johnny, Ajay, Krishna, and another close associate. Srinivasa Murthy strongly believes that time determines destiny and that patience and honesty will eventually be rewarded.

Thulasi is a gentle and traditional young woman who is the daughter of Govindarajan and Lakshmi. She has a younger brother. Though Thulasi develops feelings for Srinivasa Murthy, she hesitates to express her love due to her family’s conservative values and her father’s strict nature.

Priya, the daughter of a wealthy businessman, becomes infatuated with Srinivasa Murthy. Priya lives with her younger sister and is surrounded by household servants. Her affection for Srinivasa Murthy gradually turns obsessive when he does not reciprocate her feelings.

Dhilip, Priya’s possessive lover, becomes intensely jealous of Srinivasa Murthy. Dhilip is encouraged by his father Seetharaman, his mother, and his controlling grandmother, which fuels his aggressive behavior. Dhilip begins creating serious problems in Srinivasa Murthy’s life.

Several supporting characters influence the unfolding events. Natarajan and his wife often attempt to mediate family disputes. Appasamy provides comic relief while also offering philosophical reflections on fate and time. Srinivasa Murthy’s life also intersects with ordinary people such as a car driver, a shop owner, postmen, and Govindarajan’s friend, reinforcing the theme that time connects lives in unexpected ways.

As tensions escalate, Priya seeks the help of a local don in a guest appearance, further complicating matters. Despite mounting pressure and threats, Srinivasa Murthy remains firm in his values and refuses to compromise his integrity.

In the climax, the truth behind Priya’s manipulations and Dhilip’s hostility is revealed. Govindarajan recognizes Srinivasa Murthy’s sincerity and accepts him as a suitable partner for Thulasi. Priya finally comes to terms with reality and understands that love cannot be forced. The film concludes with Srinivasa Murthy and Thulasi united, reinforcing the central message that time ultimately rewards truth, patience, and genuine love.

== Cast ==
- Prabhu Deva as Srinivasa Murthy
- Simran as Thulasi
- Radhika Chaudhari as Priya
- Babloo Prithiveeraj as Dhilip
- Charle as Chittappa, Srinivasa Murthy's friend
- Manivannan as Appasamy
- Nassar as Govindarajan, Thulasi's father
- Moulee as Natarajan
- Devan as Seetharaman, Dhilip's father
- Bobby Poonia as David
- Pandu as Priya's father
- Vaiyapuri as Servant
- Thadi Balaji as Srinivasa Murthy's friend
- Ambika as Srinivasa Murthy's mother
- Kovai Sarala as Natarajan's wife
- Sabitha Anand as Dhilip's mother
- Chandra Mohan as Car driver
- J. V. Ramana Murthi as Shop owner
- Raviraj as Govindarajan's friend
- Kallu Chidambaram as Postman
- Sharmili as Priya's mother
- Radhabhai as Dhilip's grandmother
- Bhanusri as Servant
- Lekhasri
- Manga Reddy as Lakshmi, Thulasi's mother
- Dubbing Janaki as Chittappa's mother
- Baby Jennifer as Priya's sister
- Master Bharath Jayanth as Abhi, Thulasi's brother (erroneously credited as Bharathkumar)
- Sahadevan as Postman
- Mahadevan as Postman
- Harikumar as Srinivasa Murthy's friend
- Gopi as Srinivasa Murthy's friend
- Johnny as Srinivasa Murthy's friend
- Ajay as Srinivasa Murthy's friend
- Krishna as Srinivasa Murthy's friend
- Anandaraj as Local don (guest appearance)

== Production ==
The film marked the directorial debut of Geetha Krishna in Tamil, and began as a quadrilingual venture in Tamil, Hindi, Telugu and Malayalam. Prashanth was initially announced as the hero in the film as early as November 1997 when the film's launch took place. Prashanth started working for the film in Kodaikanal during October 1998 but later backed out, while Ajith Kumar also refused the film due to lack of time. After several delays, Prabhu Deva was subsequently selected to play the lead role and the film was shot only in Tamil. Two debutant actresses were announced to portray the lead female roles, Menaka Senail and Radhika Chaudhari, though the former was later replaced by Simran. Model Bobbu Poonai made his acting debut as the antagonist. Filming mainly took place in and around Annavaram, Vishakhapatnam and Srikakulam in Andhra Pradesh, while minority of scenes were shot in and around Alappuzha and Pathanamthitta in Kerala. Malaysian Tamil director Sandosh Kesavan worked as an assistant cameraman.

== Soundtrack ==
The songs were composed by Ilaiyaraaja and lyrics were written by Palani Bharathi. To compose the songs, Ilaiyaraaja and Geetha Krishna went on a recce to Maldives and had longlisted thirty songs for the film, before picking six. For the Telugu version, the lyrics were written by Veturi and Vanamali. The song "Kadhal Neethana" later used as a background score in the 2022 film Love Today.

Song	Singers	Length
"Kadhal Neethana"	Unni Krishnan, Sujatha	05:01
"Muthu Nilave"	Karthik Raja, Bhavatharini	05:50
"Naan Thanga Roja"	Swarnalatha, S. P. Balasubrahmanyam	05:10
"Ninachapadi"	Unni Menon, Devan, Malgudi Subha	05:42
"Niram Pirithu"	Sujatha	05:16
"Thavikkiren Thavikkiren"	Bhavatharini, Hariharan	05:11

== Critical reception ==
Malathi Rangarajan of The Hindu wrote, "Two aspects of Time stand out – Ilaiyaraja's re-recording and M. V. Paneer's camera work. As for the rest, there isn't much to be said". K. N. Vijiyan of New Straits Times wrote the film has shades of Kadhal Kottai (1996), but "the story gets a little muddled in the end". Chennai Online wrote "The locales are exotic, the frames beautiful and the costume colourful. But what the film lacks is cohesive narration".

Regarding the Telugu dubbed version, Grdiddaluru Gopalrao of Zamin Ryot wrote that this is not a typical love story and also praised the music and cinematography. Reviewing the same, Kiran of Telugucinema.com wrote, "The movie has a wafer thin story line. The first half is too slow. The story doesn't move anywhere. The second half is too confusing and complex. The ending is abrupt. Probably, Geetakrishna should go back to some film institute and learn direction".
