= Maro Malupu =

- Directed by: Vejella Satyanarayana
- Starring: Gummadi; Nutan Prasad; Sivakrishna; Geetha; Leelavathi
- Cinematography: R. K. Raju
- Edited by: Baburao
- Music by: G. K. Venkatesh
- Release date: 1982
- Country: India
- Language: Telugu

Maro Malupu is a 1982 Indian Telugu-language film directed by Vejella Satyanarayana. This Nandi Award-winning film is based on the Caste system in India and social conditions. The film won three Nandi Awards.

== Cast ==
- Gummadi
- Narasimha Raju
- J. V. Ramana Murthi
- Sivakrishna
- Geetha
- Leelavathi
- Sai Chand
- P. L. Narayana

== Songs ==
- "Erra Errani Thamashala"

== Awards ==
Nandi Awards

- Second Best Feature Film - Silver - Sagi Krishnam Raju.
- Best Supporting Actor - Gummadi
- Best First Film of a Director - Vejella Satyanarayana
