= Geetha Krishna =

Indian film director

- Born: India
- Occupation: Film director
- Years active: 1987–present
- Awards: Nandi Award for Best First Film of a Director; 1987 Sankeerthana

Geetha Krishna is an Indian film director, who has made Telugu and Tamil films. He made his debut with the Telugu film Sankeertana starring Nagarjuna, for which he won the Nandi Award for Best First Film of a Director. Since then, he has directed a series of Telugu and Tamil films.

== Career ==
Geetha Krishna's debut film Sankeertana was a musical love story, set against religious taboos featuring Nagarjuna and Ramya Krishnan. The film became a successful venture commercially and he won the Nandi Award for Best First Film of a Director. Next he made Kokila - a crime-mystery based on eye transplantation, a socially relevant theme in the late 1980s and the film also fared well critically. Geetha Krishna next made two further experimental films with Keechuraallu and Priyathama on the issue of schizophrenia. After a sabbatical, he returned in 1996 with Server Sundaramagaari Abbayi which dealt with heart transplantation as the main theme, where he also composed the film's music himself.

He went on to make a Tamil film in 1999, Time featuring Prabhu Deva and Simran. In the late 2000s, he began work on a bilingual venture known as Koffi Bar, with the Telugu version releasing in 2011 and the Tamil version, Nimidangal, two years later. In 2013, he revealed he was working on sixty five hour docudrama that maps the history of India starting from the Indus Valley civilization. Titled My Country India Time Capsule, Geetha Krishna researched the project extensively and expressed that the venture would involve top technicians and artistes.

== Filmography ==
Year	Film	Language	Notes
1987	Sankeertana	Telugu	Nandi Award for Best First Film of a Director
1990	Kokila	Telugu	
1991	Keechurallu	Telugu	
1992	Priyathama	Telugu	
1996	Server Sundaramgari Abbayi	Telugu	
1999	Time	Tamil	
2011	Koffi Bar	Telugu	
2013	Nimidangal	Tamil	
