= Nandi Award for Best First Film of a Director =

Indian film award

The Nandi Award for Best Debut Director winners was instituted in 1981. This is a list of the winners of the award over the years and the films they have won for.

Year	Director	Film	Ref
2016	Kalyan Krishna Kurasala	Soggade Chinni Nayana	
2015	Nag Ashwin	Yevade Subramanyam	
2014	Chandoo Mondeti	Karthikeya	
2013	Koratala Siva	Mirchi	
2012	Ayodhya Kumar	Minugurulu	
2011	Bhanu Prakash	Prayogam	
2010	Nandini Reddy	Ala Modalaindi	
2009	Suman Pathuri	Inkosaari	
2008	Sai Kiran Adivi	Vinayakudu	
2007	Ravi Tenali	Muhurtham	
2006	Bhaskar	Bommarillu	
2005	Surender Reddy	Athanokkade	
2004	Indraganti Mohan Krishna	Grahanam	
2003	Rasool Ellore	Okariki Okaru	
2002	V. V. Vinayak	Aadi	
2001	K. N. T. Sastry	Thiladanam	
2000	G. Ramprasad	Chiru Navvutho	
1999	Srinu Vaitla	Nee Kosam	
1998	A. Karunakaran	Tholi Prema	
1997	Veeru K	Aaro Pranam	
1996	Gangaraju Gunnam	Little Soldiers	
1995	Krishna Vamsi	Gulabi	
1994	No Award	No Award	
1993	N. Shiva Nageswara Rao	Money	
1992	Gunasekhar	Laati	
1991	K. Srirama Chandra Murthry	Manjeera Nadam	
1990	Alladi Sreedhar	Komaram Bheemu	
1989	Ram Gopal Varma	Siva	
1988	M. V. Raghu	Kallu	
1987	Geetha Krishna	Sankeerthana	
1986	B. Gopal	Prathidvani	
1984	Kranthi Kumar	Swathi	
1983	T. Krishna	Neti Bharatam	
1982	Vejella Satyanarayana	Maro Malupu	
1981	Yerramneni Chandramouli	Palle Pilichindi	
