= Repati Pourulu =

- Film poster
- Directed by: T. Krishna
- Written by: T. Krishna; M. V. S. Haranatha Rao (dialogues)
- Produced by: Pokuri Venkateswara Rao
- Starring: Vijayashanti; Dr. Rajasekhar
- Cinematography: R. Rama Rao
- Edited by: Gautam Raju
- Music by: K. Chakravarthy
- Production company: Etaram Films
- Release date: 5 September 1986
- Running time: 135 minutes
- Country: India
- Language: Telugu

Repati Pourulu (transl. Citizens of tomorrow) is a 1986 Indian Telugu-language action film written and directed by T. Krishna. The film stars Vijayashanti and Rajasekhar while Anuradha and Y. Vijaya play supporting roles. It has music composed by K. Chakravarthy. The film won two Nandi Awards and the Filmfare Award for Best Film – Telugu.

== Plot ==
Saraswati is a schoolteacher engaged to Ravi. Their lives are affected by political corruption and the influence wielded by the people behind it. Ravi becomes aware of the wrongdoing and attempts to expose those responsible. His attempt places him in danger, and he is murdered before he can bring the matter to light.

Following Ravi's death, Saraswati is sexually assaulted.

The crimes committed against the couple reveal the vulnerability of ordinary people in the face of power and intimidation. Saraswati's students are deeply affected by the injustice suffered by their teacher and her fiancé.

Refusing to remain silent, the students unite to seek justice. They set out to identify and confront the people responsible for Ravi's murder and Saraswati's assault. Their campaign against corruption and abuse of power forms the central conflict of the film, with the students emerging as representatives of a younger generation determined to challenge social injustice.

== Cast ==
- Vijayashanti
- Rajasekhar
- Anuradha
- Suthi Velu
- Rallapalli
- P. L. Narayana
- Kota Srinivasa Rao
- Narra Venkateswara Rao
- Y. Vijaya
- G. Ashok

== Soundtrack ==
K. Chakravarthy composed the score and soundtrack with lyrics by C. Narayana Reddy, Jaladi, and Vangapandu Prasada Rao.

Track listing
No.	Title	Length
1.	"Ayya Ne Chadivi Baagupadata"
2.	"Repati Pourulam"

== Accolades ==
Filmfare Awards South – 1986

- Filmfare Award for Best Film – Telugu – P. Venkateswara Rao.

Nandi Awards – 1986

- Second Best Feature Film – Silver – Ramoji Rao
- Best Supporting Actor – P. L. Narayana
