= Prasad Babu =

Indian actor (born 1950)

- Born: Prasad Babu; 29 March 1950 (age 76)
- Occupation: Actor
- Years active: 1976-present
- Children: 1

Prasad Babu is an Indian actor who acts predominantly in Telugu-language films and TV serials.

== Filmography ==
=== Telugu ===
- Anthuleni Katha (1976) as Thilak
- Mana Voori Pandavulu (1978)
- Dongala Veta (1978) as Anand
- Pottelu Punnamma (1978) as Gupta
- Punadhirallu (1979)
- Maa Voollo Mahasivudu (1979) as Gopal
- Yugandhar (1979) as Ramesh
- I Love You (1979) as Sathyam4
- Kaali (1980)
- Jathara (1980) as Rebellious Villager
- Aarani Mantalu (1980) as Inspector Madhu
- Jeevitha Ratham (1981) as Dasu
- Krishnavataram (1982)
- Bobbili Puli (1982)
- Nivuru Gappina Nippu (1982)
- Bangaru Koduku (1982)
- Nijam Chepithe Nerama (1983) as Subbudu
- Kanchu Kagada (1984) as Commander
- Dandayatra (1984)
- Kondaveeti Nagulu (1984) as Rudrayya
- Kongumudi (1985) as Sekhar's lecherous friend
- Nerasthudu (1985) as Kishtayya
- Ide Naa Samadhanam (1986) as Sivam
- Vijrumbhana (1986) as Police Officer
- Prathibhavanthudu (1986) as Ramesh
- Jebu Donga (1987) as Police Inspector
- Srinivasa Kalyanam (1987)
- Trinetrudu (1988)
- Rudraveena (1988)
- Bharya Bhartalu (1988) as Shankar
- Khaidi No. 786 (1988) as Jailor Durga Rao
- Yamudiki Mogudu (1988)
- Inspector Pratap (1988)
- Yuddha Bhoomi (1988)
- August 15 Raatri (1988)
- Anna Chellelu (1988) as Dr. Giri
- Aarthanadham (1989) as Ravindra Babu
- Atha Mechina Alludu (1989) as Rayudu's younger brother
- Vicky Daada (1989) as Amrutha Rao's elder son
- Kaliyuga Abhimanyudu (1990) as Suthaji
- Kondaveeti Donga (1990) as Forest Officer
- Jagadeka Veerudu Athiloka Sundari (1990) as Narada
- Raja Vikramarka (1990) as Thangavelu
- Dharma (1990)
- Kodama Simham (1990)
- Gang Leader (1991)
- Jagannatakam (1991)
- Police Encounter (1991)
- Super Express (1991) as Vincent
- Amma Rajinama (1991)
- Assembly Rowdy (1991)
- Allari Mogudu (1992)
- Asadhyulu (1992)
- Srimaan Brahmachari (1992)
- Mechanic Alludu (1993)
- Rowdy Mogudu (1993) as Inspector Prasad
- Police Alludu (1994) as Chinnanna
- Muddayi Muddugumma (1995) as Hotel Manager
- Ghatotkachudu (1995) as Duryodhana
- Khaidi Inspector (1995) as Circle Inspector
- Amma Durgamma (1996)
- Puttinti Gowravam (1996)
- Neti Gandhi (1999)
- Rajakumarudu (1999)
- Nuvvu Vastavani (2000)
- Ayodhya Ramayya (2000)
- Jayam Manadera (2000)
- Thiladanam (2000)
- Manasu Paddanu Kaani (2000)
- Murari (2001) as Seenayya, Murari's eldest brother and Gopi's husband
- Prematho Raa (2001) as Officer In-Charge at Airport
- Pandanti Samsaram (2001)
- Evadra Rowdy (2001) as Police Officer
- Apparao Nelatappadu (2001)
- Police Sisters (2002)
- Vachina Vaadu Suryudu (2002)
- Aadavari Matalaku Arthale Verule (2007)
- Okka Magaadu (2008)
- Pandurangadu (2008) as Siva Sarma
- Veedu Mamoolodu Kadu (2008)
- Dammu (2012)
- Hrudayam Ekkadunnadi (2014)

=== Tamil ===
- Kaali (1980)
- Suriya Paarvai (1999) as Prakash
- Unnal Mudiyum Thambi (1988)

== Television ==
- Ninne Pelladutha (Gemini TV)
- Jayam (ETV)
- Chinna Kodalu as Surendra Varma (Zee Telugu)
- Ramulamma as Raja (MAA TV)
- Bandham (Gemini TV)
- Prem nagar(ETV)
- Anu Ane Nenu (Gemini TV)
- Godavari (Jio Hotstar)
