= P. L. Narayana =

Indian actor

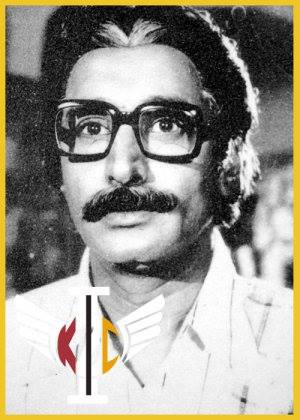
- Born: Lakshmi Narayana; 10 Sep 1935; Bapatla, British Raj
- Died: 3 November 1998 (aged 63)
- Years active: 1977–present
- Awards: 1 x National Film Awards, 5 x Nandi Awards

P. Lakshmi Narayana (10 September 1935 – 3 November 1998) was an Indian actor, dialogue writer, and playwright, known for his works predominantly in Telugu cinema and a few Tamil films. He has received one National Film Award and five state Nandi Awards.

== Awards ==
National Film Awards

- National Film Award for Best Supporting Actor - Yagnam (1991)

Nandi Awards

- Best Supporting Actor for his portrayal in Kukka.
- Best Supporting Actor for his portrayal in Neti Bharatam in 1983.
- Special Jury Award for his performance in Mayuri in 1985.
- Best Supporting Actor for his acting skills in Repati Pourulu in 1986.
- Best Dialogue Writer for his writing skills in Dandora in 1993.

== Selected filmography ==
=== Telugu films ===
Year	Film	Role
1977	Chilakamma Cheppindi	Madanagopal
1978	Maro Charitra	K. Venkateswara Rao
1978	Seetamalakshmi	
1979	I Love You	Parandhamayya
1979	Kukka Katuku Cheppu Debba	
1979	Chaaya	
1979	Mande Gundelu	
1979	Cheyyethi Jai Kottu	
1980	Kottapeta Rowdy	
1980	Jathara	Kishtamurthy
1980	Kukka	
1980	Konte Mogudu Penki Pellam	Kotaiah
1980	Badai Basavayya	Ganapathayya
1980	Alludu Pattina Bharatam	
1980	Gayyali Gangamma	
1980	Chandipriya	Gaali Subba Rao
1981	Erra Mallelu	
1981	Chattaniki Kallu Levu	
1981	Prema Natakam	Gopalam, Kumar's father
1981	Maro Kurukshetram	
1981	Jagamondi	
1981	Gadasari Atta Sogasari Kodalu	Nakkajittula Appa Rao
1981	Srirasthu Subhamasthu	
1982	Intlo Ramayya Veedilo Krishnayya	
1982	Illantha Sandadi	
1982	Naa Desam	
1982	Maro Malupu	
1982	Sitadevi	
1982	Manchu Pallaki	Vasu's colleague
1982	Tarangini	
1983	Aalaya Sikharam	P.L. Narasimham
1983	Idhi Kaadu Mugimpu	Scrap dealer
1983	Gudachari No.1	
1983	Triveni Sangamam	
1983	Simhapuri Simham	
1983	Ikanaina Marandi	
1983	Khaidi	Venkateswarlu
1983	Maro Maya Bazaar	
1983	Poratam	
1983	Neti Bharatam	
1984	Dandayaatra	
1984	Mayuri	Mayuri's Father
1984	Srivariki Premalekha	
1984	Swathi	
1984	Pralaya Simham	Seetharam
1984	Adigo Alladigo	
1984	Rama Rao Gopal Rao a.k.a. Rao Gopal Rao	'Forgery' Sambamurthy
1984	Nayakulaku Saval	Chief Minister
1985	Chattamtho Poratam	Dharmaiah
1985	Mayuri	
1985	Adavi Donga	
1985	Donga	
1985	Vajrayudham	
1985	Kanchu Kavacham	
1985	Devalayam	
1985	Sri Katna Leelalu	Narasayya
1985	Garjana	Shankaram
1985	Siksha	
1985	Pratighatana	
1985	Vande Mataram	
1985	Surya Chandra	
1986	Driver Babu	Raheem Chacha
1986	Nireekshana	
1986	Prathidwani	
1986	Vetagallu	Danayya
1986	Kaliyuga Pandavulu	
1986	Kondaveeti Raja	
1986	Rendu Rellu Aaru	
1986	Brahma Rudrulu	
1986	Ardharatri Swatantram	
1986	Repati Pourulu	
1986	Jayam Manade	Venkatanarayana
1987	Prajaswamyam	Srinivasa Rao
1987	Agni Putrudu	
1987	Rotation Chakravarthy	
1987	Lawyer Suhasini	
1987	Veera Viharam	
1987	Collector Gari Abbai	
1987	Bharatamlo Arjunudu	
1987	Aradhana	
1987	Ramu	
1987	Prema Samrat	Murthy
1987	Swayam Krushi	
1988	Rudraveena	Lawyer
1988	Ooregimpu	
1988	Tiragabadda Telugubidda	
1988	Nava Bharatham	
1988	Premayanam	
1988	Annapurnamma Gari Alludu	
1988	Rocky	
1988	Raktha Tilakam	
1988	Aadade Aadharam	
1988	Nyayaniki Sankellu	
1988	August 15 Raatri	
1988	Ramudu Bheemudu	
1989	Indrudu Chandrudu	
1989	Ashoka Chakravarthy	
1989	Bhooporatam	
1989	Neram Nadi Kadu	
1989	Prema	
1989	Bharatha Nari	
1989	Bhale Donga	Sculptor
1989	Vijay	
1990	Aayudham	
1990	Karthavyam	Constable Gopal Swamy
1990	Prema Khaidi	
1990	Mrugathrushna	
1991	Sathruvu	
1991	Parama Sivudu	
1991	Yerra Mandaram	
1992	Gharana Mogudu	Narayana
1992	Nani	
1992	Jagannatham & Sons	
1992	Valu Jada Tolu Beltu	
1992	Kalarathrilo Kannepilla	
1992	Seethapathi Chalo Tirupathi	
1992	Chinarayudu	
1993	Ankuram	
1993	Inspector Ashwini	
1993	Akka Chellelu	
1993	Jeevana Vedam	
1993	Yagnam	
1993	Illu Pelli	
1993	Abbayigaru	
1993	Prema Pusthakam	
1994	M. Dharmaraju M.A.	
1994	Srivari Priyuralu	
1995	Telugu Veera Levara	Freedom Fighter
1995	Stri	
1996	Amma Nagamma	
1996	Pittala Dora	
1996	Ooha	
1998	Rajahamsa	
1998	Subbaraju Gari Kutumbam	
1998	Ganesh	
1998	Sri Ramulayya	

=== Other language films ===
Year	Film	Role	Language
1987	Pushpaka Vimana	Beggar	Sound
1991	Thalapathi		Tamil
1995	Indira		Tamil
1997	Iruvar	Ramasamy	Tamil
