= T. Krishna =

Indian film director and screenwriter

- Portrait of T. Krishna
- Born: Tottempudi Krishna; 1 September 1950; Kakuturivaripalem, Andhra Pradesh, India
- Died: 21 October 1986 (aged 36); Madras, Tamil Nadu, India
- Occupations: Film director; screenwriter
- Spouse: Koteswarmma
- Children: 3; including Gopichand

Tottempudi Krishna (1 September 1950 – 21 October 1986) was an Indian film director and screenwriter who worked in Telugu cinema. Known for directing revolutionary films, his notable works include Pratighatana, Repati Pourulu, and Neti Bharatham, which have won the Filmfare Best Films Telugu. He won four Nandi Awards and was the founder of Eetaram Films.

His last film Repati Pourulu was released in 1986, after his death. His son Gopichand is a Telugu film actor.

== Early life ==
T. Krishna was born on 1 September 1950 in Kakuturivaripalem of present-day Prakasam district, Andhra Pradesh to Rathamma and Venkata Subbaiah. Krishna completed his B.A. from CSR Sarma College in Ongole.

== Career ==
He directed Neti Bharatam (1983) starred by Suman, Vijayashanti; Vande Maataram (1985) starred by Vijayashanti, Rajasekhar, Rajendra Prasad; Devaalayam (1985) starred by Late Sobhan Babu and many more.

His film Pratighatana (1985) was the story of a woman's (Vijayashanti) fight against corruption and criminalization of politics in India. This film was later remade in Hindi as Pratighaat starred by Sujata Mehta and Nana Patekar. His last film Repati Pourulu (1986) starred by Vijayashanti and Rajasekhar was released after his death. He was the co-founder of the banner Eetharam Films with his partner Babu Rao Pokuri.

== Personal life ==
Krishna married Koteswarmma and the couple had two sons and a daughter. One of his sons, Premchand, was an aspiring director but died in a car accident in 1995 while directing his first film. His second son Gopichand is also a notable Telugu film actor. Gopichand started his career playing the role of villain but in later films, played the hero. His daughter is a dentist.

Krishna died on 21 October 1986 due to cancer. He took treatment in the United States for two months before his death at the Apollo Hospital, Madras.

== Filmography ==
Director & Actor

Year	Film	Language	Notes
1983	Neti Bharatam	Telugu	
1985	Desam Lo Dongalu Paddaru	Telugu	
1985	Devalayam	Telugu	
1985	Vande Mataram	Telugu	
1985	Pratighatana	Telugu	
1986	Pakarathinu Pakaram	Malayalam	
1986	Ardharatri Swatantram	Telugu	Actor
1986	Repati Pourulu	Telugu	

Producer

1. Puttadi Bomma Poornamma (1981): Documentary film

== Awards ==
Nandi Awards

- Best Documentary Film – Puttadi Bomma Poornamma (1981)
- Best Screenplay Writer – Neti Bharatam (1983)
- Best First Film of a Director – Neti Bharatam (1983)
- Best Story Writer – Pratighatana (1986)
