= Mahesh Babu filmography =

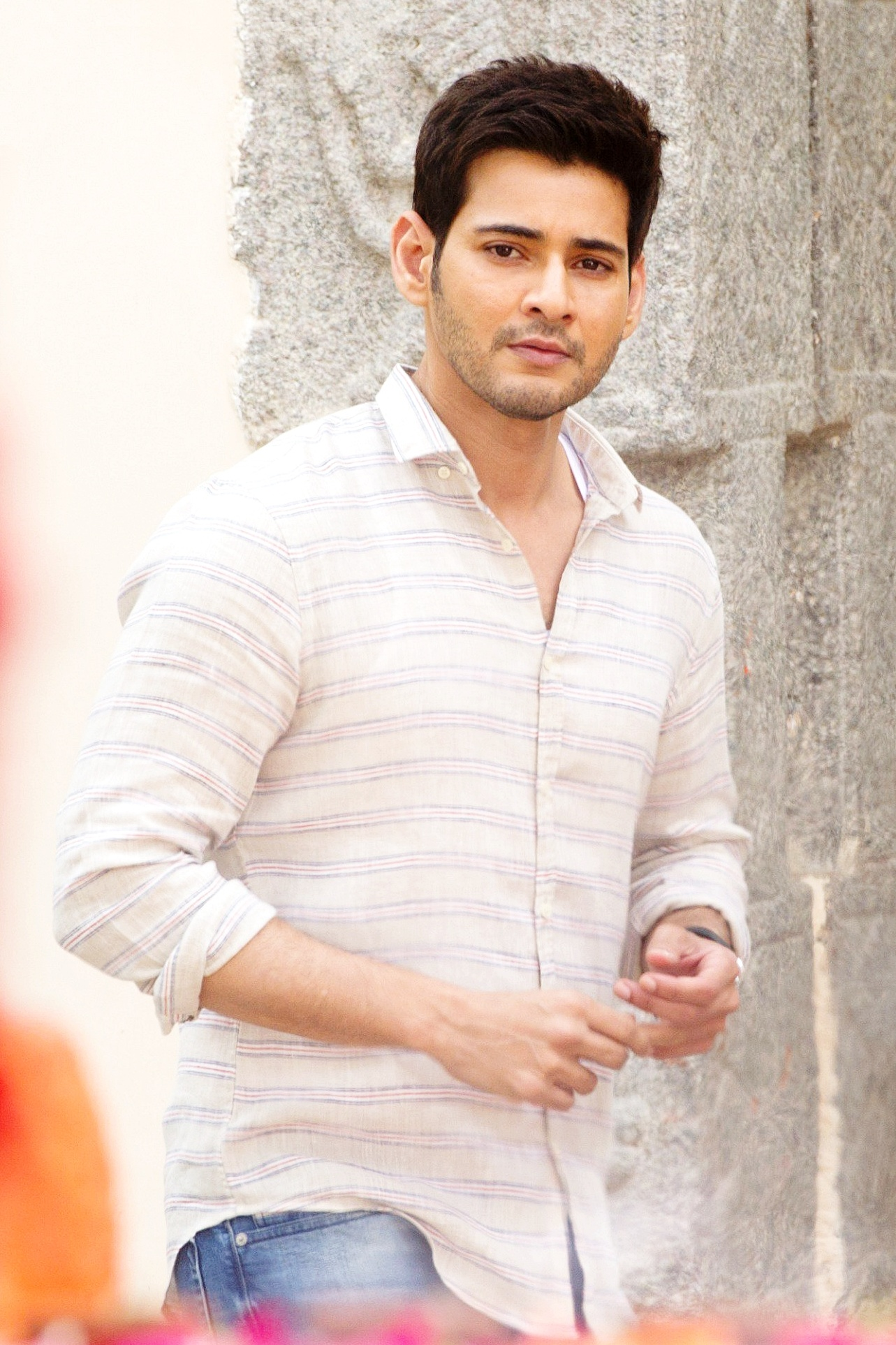
- Film: 37

Mahesh Babu is an Indian actor and producer known for his work in Telugu cinema. He first appeared in the 1979 film Needa when he was four years old. He continued to perform as a child actor in several films, most of which featured his father Krishna. Following his role as the titular protagonist in Balachandrudu (1990) while still a child, his career went on hiatus so he could concentrate on his education until taking on his first lead role as an adult in the 1999 film Rajakumarudu, for which he won the Nandi Award for Best Male Debut. Afterwards, his career stagnated until successes like Murari (2001), Okkadu (2003) and Athadu (2005) brought him fame. In 2006, he played a gangster in the Puri Jagannadh-directed action-thriller Pokiri. The film became the highest-grossing Telugu film of all time, and according to Vogue India, cemented Babu's reputation as a "superstar".

In the wake of the failures of Sainikudu (2006) and Athidhi (2007), Babu took a long-term break from cinema for personal reasons. His next project, the fantasy action film Khaleja, was released in 2010 after significant delays. In 2011, he starred in Dookudu, which became the first Telugu film to gross over ₹1 billion. Businessman (2012), his next film, was well received and became one of the year's highest grossing Telugu films at a time that was particularly harsh on other big-budget productions. The following year, Babu co-starred alongside Venkatesh in the critically and commercially acclaimed drama film Seethamma Vakitlo Sirimalle Chettu, which was considered the first Telugu multi-starrer in decades. He then featured in Sukumar's 2014 psychological thriller film 1: Nenokkadine. Although Babu's performance as a schizophrenic rock star was lauded by critics, the film itself received mixed reviews and failed to recover its budget. Aagadu, his next release that year, suffered a similar fate, despite the film's opening gross being his highest at the time.

His 2015 action-drama Srimanthudu was a commercial success and earned Babu his fifth Filmfare Award for Best Actor – Telugu as well as his eighth Nandi Award in any category, the most by any individual. The film was also his first as a producer. His subsequent film Brahmotsavam (2016) and his first bilingual film Spyder (2017) under-performed at the box office. The actor's next role was as an inexperienced chief minister in Koratala Siva's Bharat Ane Nenu (2018). The film was the year's second highest-grossing Telugu production and critics praised Babu's performance. His following two films, Vamshi Paidipally's action-drama Maharshi (2019) and Anil Ravipudi's action-comedy Sarileru Neekevvaru (2020), also made substantial profits despite receiving less favourable reception. Babu's 2022 film Sarkaru Vaari Paata also received a mixed response, however, his performance was appreciated by critics. In 2024, Babu reunited with Trivikram Srinivas for their third collaboration in the film Guntur Kaaram. In 2025, Babu began filming Varanasi, his maiden collaboration with director S. S. Rajamouli.

== Films ==
Key
†	Denotes films that have not yet been released

- All films in this list are in Telugu unless otherwise indicated.

List of Mahesh Babu film credits as actor
Year	Film	Role(s)	Notes	Ref.
1979	Needa	Unknown	Child artist	
1983	Poratam	Bujji	Child artist	
1987	Sankharavam	Raja	Child artist	
1988	Bazaar Rowdy	Mahesh Babu	Child artist	
1988	Mugguru Kodukulu	Surendra	Child artist	
1989	Gudachari 117	Chinna	Child artist	
1989	Koduku Diddina Kapuram	Vinod / Pramod (Note: Babu plays two roles in the film.)	Child artist	
1990	Anna Thammudu	Murali	Child artist	
1990	Balachandrudu	Balachandra	Child artist	
1999	Rajakumarudu	Raja	Debut in a lead role; credited as Mahesh	
2000	Yuvaraju	Srinivas		
2000	Vamsi	Vamsi		
2001	Murari	Murari		
2002	Takkari Donga	Raja		
2002	Bobby	Bobby		
2003	Okkadu	Ajay Varma		
2003	Nijam	G. Seetaram		
2004	Naani	Vijay "Viju" / Naani and Jai		
2004	Arjun	Arjun		
2005	Athadu	Nanda "Nandu" Gopal / Pardhu (Note: Babu played a single character with two or more names.)		
2006	Pokiri	Pandu / Krishna Manohar IPS		
2006	Sainikudu	Siddharth		
2007	Athidhi	Athidhi		
2010	Khaleja	Alluri Seetharama Raju		
2011	Dookudu	G. Ajay Kumar IPS / Ballary Babu		
2012	Businessman	Vijay Surya "Surya Bhai"	Also playback singer for "Theme Music (Bhaag Saale)"	
2013	Seethamma Vakitlo Sirimalle Chettu	Chinnodu		
2014	1: Nenokkadine	Gautham		
2014	Aagadu	CI G. Shankar / "Encounter" Shankar		
2015	Srimanthudu	Harsha Vardhan		
2016	Brahmotsavam	Ajay Chantibabu		
2017	Spyder	Shiva	Simultaneously shot in Tamil	
2018	Bharat Ane Nenu	Bharath Ram		
2019	Maharshi	K. Rishi Kumar	25th film	
2020	Sarileru Neekevvaru	Major Ajay Krishna		
2022	Sarkaru Vaari Paata	Mahesh "Mahi"		
2024	Guntur Kaaram	Bhogineni Veera Venkata Ramana		
2027	Varanasi †	Rudhra / Lord Rama	Filming	

== Other roles ==
=== As a producer ===
List of Mahesh Babu film credits as a producer
Year	Film	Notes	Ref.
2020	Sarileru Neekevvaru		
2022	Major	Telugu–Hindi bilingual film	
2026	Rao Bahadur	Presenter only	

=== As a voice actor ===
List of Mahesh Babu film credits in voice roles
Year	Film	Role(s)	Notes	Ref.
2008	Jalsa	Narrator		
2013	Baadshah	Narrator		
2016	Sri Sri	Narrator		
2018	Manasuku Nachindi	Narrator		
2022	Acharya	Narrator		
2024	Mufasa: The Lion King	Mufasa	Telugu version	

== See also ==
- List of awards and nominations received by Mahesh Babu
- G. Mahesh Babu Entertainment
