= List of awards and nominations received by Mahesh Babu =

Mahesh Babu awards and nominations
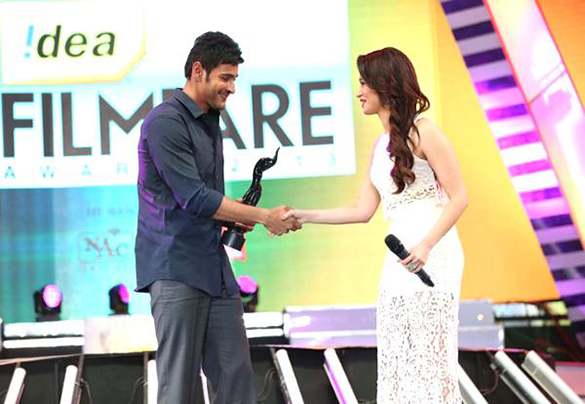
- Babu receiving the Filmfare Award for Best Actor from Tamannaah
Awards and nominations
Award	Wins	Nominations
Cinegoers' Association Awards	1	0
CineMAA Awards	3	0
Filmfare Awards South	5	4
Hyderabad Times Film Awards	0	1
IIFA Utsavam	1	0
Nandi Awards	9	0
Radio City Cine Awards	1	0
Santosham Film Awards	3	0
SIIMA	4	4
TSR– TV9 National Film Awards	1	0
Zee Cine Awards Telugu	1	2
Others	5	1

Totals (Note: Certain award groups do not simply award one winner. They acknowledge several different recipients, have runners-up, and have third place. Since this is a specific recognition and is different from losing an award, runner-up mentions are considered wins in this award tally. For simplification and to avoid errors, each award in this list has been presumed to have had a prior nomination.)
- Wins: 25
- Nominations: 35

Mahesh Babu is an Indian actor, producer, media personality, and philanthropist who works mainly in Telugu cinema. He has established as one of the popular celebrities in India and also one of the highest paid actors in India. Babu has appeared in more than 25 films, and won several accolades including nine Nandi Awards, five Filmfare Awards, four SIIMA awards, three CineMAA Awards, and one IIFA Utsavam Award. He has featured in Forbes India's Celebrity 100 list since 2012.

Babu won his first award (Nandi Award for Best Male Debut) in 2000 for his performance in Raja Kumarudu, and has gone on to win the most Nandi Awards out of any individual. His performance in films such as Okkadu, Dookudu and Srimanthudu fetched him further more awards including two CineMAA Awards, three Filmfare South Awards, two Nandi Awards and one Santosham Film Award. Mahesh has the second highest wins in the category Filmfare Award for Best Actor – Telugu, next to Chiranjeevi.

== Awards and nominations ==
Awards and nominations received by Mahesh Babu
Award	Year	Nominated work	Category	Result	Ref.
CineMAA Awards	2003	Okkadu	Best Actor – Male	Won	
CineMAA Awards	2011	Dookudu	Best Actor – Male	Won (Note: Tied with N. T. Rama Rao Jr. for Simhadri.)	
CineMAA Awards	2015	1: Nenokkadine	Best Actor – Male (Jury)	Won	
Filmfare Awards South	2002	Murari	Best Actor – Telugu	Nominated	
Filmfare Awards South	2004	Okkadu	Best Actor – Telugu	Won	
Filmfare Awards South	2004	Nijam	Best Actor – Telugu	Nominated	
Filmfare Awards South	2006	Athadu	Best Actor – Telugu	Nominated	
Filmfare Awards South	2007	Pokiri	Best Actor – Telugu	Won	
Filmfare Awards South	2011	Dookudu	Best Actor – Telugu	Won	
Filmfare Awards South	2012	Businessman	Best Actor – Telugu	Nominated	
Filmfare Awards South	2013	Seethamma Vakitlo Sirimalle Chettu	Best Actor – Telugu	Won	
Filmfare Awards South	2015	Srimanthudu	Best Actor – Telugu	Won	
Filmfare Awards South	2019	Bharat Ane Nenu	Best Actor – Telugu	Nominated	
Filmfare Awards South	2022	Sarileru Neekevvaru	Best Actor – Telugu	Nominated	
Filmfare Awards South	2024	Major	Best Film – Telugu	Nominated	
IIFA Utsavam	2016	Srimanthudu	Best Actor – Telugu	Won	
Nandi Awards	1999	Raja Kumarudu	Best Male Debut	Won	
Nandi Awards	2002	Murari	Special Jury Award	Won	
Nandi Awards	2003	Takkari Donga	Special Jury Award	Won	
Nandi Awards	2005	Arjun	Special Jury Award	Won	
Nandi Awards	2004	Nijam	Best Actor	Won	
Nandi Awards	2006	Athadu	Best Actor	Won	
Nandi Awards	2011	Dookudu	Best Actor	Won	
Nandi Awards	2015	Srimanthudu	Best Actor	Won	
Nandi Awards	2015	Srimanthudu	Best Popular Feature Film	Won	
Santosham Film Awards	2004	Okkadu	Best Young Performer	Won	
Santosham Film Awards	2007	Pokiri	Best Actor	Won	
Santosham Film Awards	2013	Businessman	Best Actor	Won	
Gaddar Telangana Film Awards	2015	Srimanthudu	Best Film (Third Prize)	Won	
Gaddar Telangana Film Awards	2023	Major	Best Film (Third Prize)	Won	
South Indian International Movie Awards	2012	Dookudu	Best Actor – Telugu	Won	
South Indian International Movie Awards	2013	Businessman	Best Actor – Telugu	Nominated	
South Indian International Movie Awards	2014	Seethamma Vakitlo Sirimalle Chettu	Best Actor – Telugu	Won	
South Indian International Movie Awards	2015	1: Nenokkadine	Best Actor – Telugu	Nominated	
South Indian International Movie Awards	2016	Srimanthudu	Best Actor – Telugu	Won	
South Indian International Movie Awards	2019	Bharat Ane Nenu	Best Actor – Telugu	Nominated	
South Indian International Movie Awards	2021	Maharshi	Best Actor – Telugu	Won	
South Indian International Movie Awards	2021	Sarileru Neekevvaru	Best Actor – Telugu	Nominated	
South Indian International Movie Awards	2023	Major	Best Film – Telugu	Nominated	
Zee Cine Awards Telugu	2020	—N/a	Twitter Star	Won	
Zee Cine Awards Telugu	2020	Maharshi	Favorite Actor	Nominated	
Zee Cine Awards Telugu	2020	Maharshi	Best Actor – Male	Nominated	

== See also ==
- Mahesh Babu filmography
