= Mahesh Babu =

Indian actor and film producer (b. 1975)

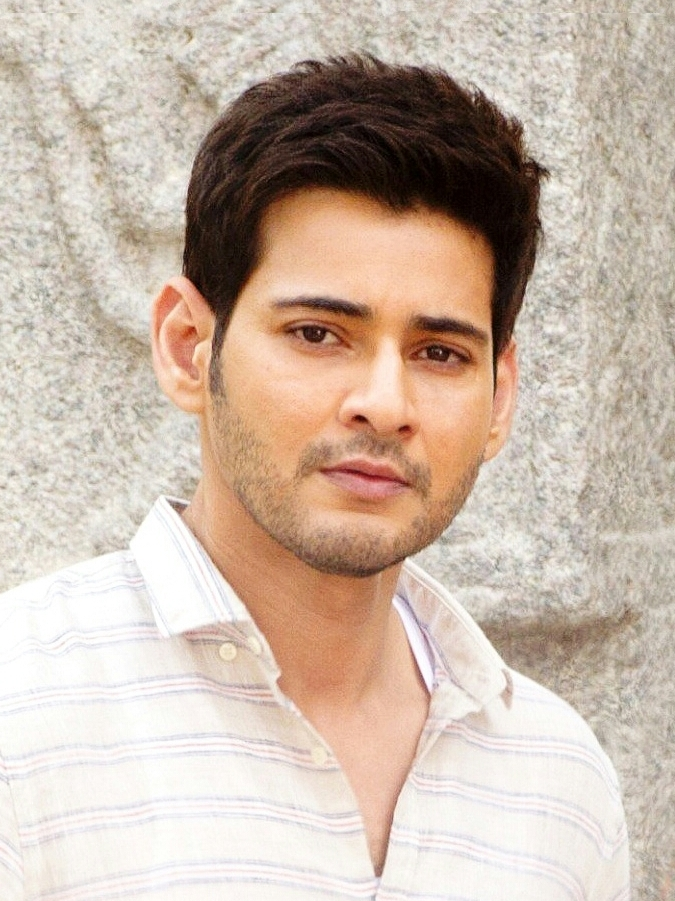
- Babu in 2017
- Born: Ghattamaneni Mahesh Babu; 9 August 1975 (age 51); Madras, Tamil Nadu, India
- Education: Loyola College (BCom)
- Occupations: Actor; film producer
- Years active: 1979–1990 (child artist); 1999–present
- Organization: GMB Entertainment
- Works: Full list
- Spouse: Namrata Shirodkar (m. 2005)
- Children: 2
- Father: Krishna
- Family: Ghattamaneni family
- Awards: Full list

Signature
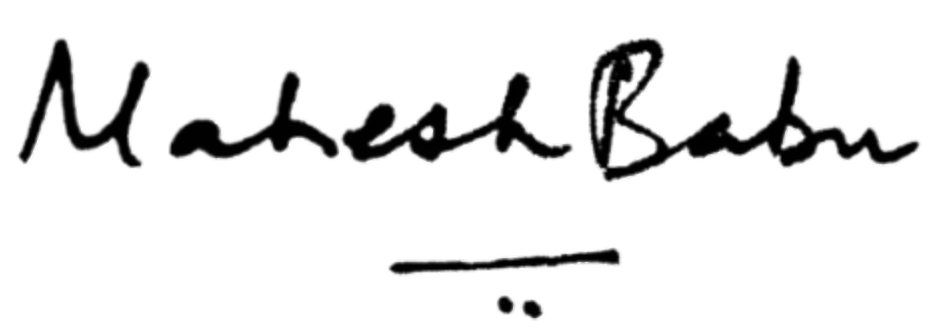

Ghattamaneni Mahesh Babu (born 9 August 1975) is an Indian actor, producer and philanthropist who works in Telugu cinema. He is one of the highest-paid actors in Indian cinema and has been featured in Forbes India's Celebrity 100 list from 2012 to 2025. Referred to in the media as the Superstar, he appeared in over 30 films and has been a recipient of several accolades including, nine Nandi Awards, five Filmfare Awards South and four SIIMA Awards.

The younger son of veteran actor Krishna, Babu made his debut as a child artist in a cameo role in a Telugu film called Needa (1979), at the age of four. He went on to act as a child artist in the films Sankharavam (1987), Bazaar Rowdy, Mugguru Kodukulu (both 1988) and Gudachari 117 (1989). He played a dual role in the film Koduku Diddina Kapuram (1989). Babu then appeared in Balachandrudu and Anna Thammudu (both 1990). He made his debut as a lead actor with Rajakumarudu (1999) which won him the Nandi Award for Best Male Debut.

Babu achieved his breakthrough with the supernatural drama Murari (2001) and the action film Okkadu (2003), winning his first Filmfare Award for Best Actor – Telugu for his performance in the latter. He went on to star in other commercially successful films such as Athadu (2005), Pokiri (2006), Dookudu (2011), Businessman (2012), Seethamma Vakitlo Sirimalle Chettu (2013), Srimanthudu (2015), Bharat Ane Nenu (2018), Maharshi (2019) and Sarileru Neekevvaru (2020), some of which rank among the highest-grossing Telugu films of all time.

Babu established Mahesh Babu Foundation, which focuses on supporting children in need by funding life-saving congenital heart surgeries. He owns the production house G. Mahesh Babu Entertainment. He is also associated with Rainbow Hospitals as their goodwill ambassador. He entered into the film exhibition business in partnership with Asian Group in 2018, with the inauguration of the seven-screen multiplex, AMB cinemas in Hyderabad, followed by a nine-screen multiplex in Bengaluru. He is married to actress Namrata Shirodkar.

== Early life and education ==
Ghattamaneni Mahesh Babu was born on 9 August 1975 in a Telugu family to actor Krishna and Indira in Madras, Tamil Nadu. He is the fourth of five siblings, after Ramesh Babu, Padmavathi, and Manjula, and before Priyadarsini. His family hails from Burripalem in Guntur district, Andhra Pradesh.

Babu spent his childhood mostly in Madras under the care of his maternal grandmother Durgamma and the rest of his family. He was educated at the St. Bede's Anglo Indian Higher Secondary School, Chennai. He went on to pursue a Bachelor of Commerce degree from the Loyola College, Chennai.

== Career ==
=== Early career and breakthrough (1979–2003) ===
At the age of four, Babu visited the sets of the Telugu film Needa (1979) where its director Dasari Narayana Rao shot a few sequences of his as a part of the narrative in the presence of the former's brother Ramesh. Needa marked his debut as a child actor. In 1983, he acted in Poratam (1983) upon being requested by its director Kodi Ramakrishna. He went on to act as a child artist in the films Sankharavam (1987), Bazaar Rowdy (1988), Mugguru Kodukulu (1988) and Gudachari 117 (1989). He played a dual role in the film Koduku Diddina Kapuram (1989). Babu then appeared in Bala Chandrudu (1990), and Anna Thammudu (1990).

In 1999, Babu made his debut as a lead actor with the romantic comedy Rajakumarudu, and people began referring to him with the title Prince. For his performance, he received the Nandi Award for Best Male Debut. He starred in two films the following year – Yuvaraju and Vamsi, where he was paired opposite Namrata Shirodkar. He also starred in Krishna Vamsi's Murari (2001) opposite Sonali Bendre, which he regarded as an important film in his career. For his role in Murari, he earned a Nandi Special Jury Award, in addition to his first nomination for the Filmfare Award for Best Actor – Telugu. A critic from Sify stated, "Both Mahesh and Sonali Bendre look charming and Mahesh is in his elements as light-hearted prankster."

In 2002, his performance in Takkari Donga landed him his second Nandi Special Jury Award. He had two film releases in 2003, the first one being Gunasekhar's Okkadu co-starring Bhumika Chawla. He won his first Filmfare Award for Best Actor – Telugu for his performance in the film. The other release was Nijam co-starring Rakshita. Babu received praise from critics for his performance in the film, with Vijayalaxmi of Rediff.com calling him the only reason to watch the film's second half which she termed "a routine tale of vendetta". He won his first Nandi Award for Best Actor for his performance in the film, in addition to his third nomination for the Filmfare Award for Best Actor – Telugu.

=== Mainstream film and commercial success (2004–2010) ===
In 2004, Manjula produced his next film, Naani, directed by S. J. Surya co-starring Amisha Patel. While its simultaneously shot Tamil version New featuring a different cast proved to be commercially successful, Naani flopped at the box office. He received his third Nandi Special Jury Award for his performance in his next film, Arjun, directed by Gunasekhar and produced by Ramesh. The film released on 18 August 2004 and was successful at the box-office. The film was screened at the International Film Festival of India in the mainstream section. This was Keerthi Reddy's final acting performance prior to her retirement from the film industry. He chose to act in Trivikram Srinivas's Athadu (2005), co-starring Trisha Krishnan, whose script had been approved back in 2002 before the production of Naani and Arjun had begun. It emerged as one of the highest-grossing films of the year. The film proved to be a major boost for Babu's career as he received his fourth nomination for the Filmfare Award for Best Actor – Telugu, in addition to fetching his second Nandi Award for Best Actor for his performance in the role of a hired assassin. Idlebrain.com gave it a rating of 3.25/5 and mentioned Babu is stylish and brilliant as professional killer.Cinegoer.net gave a review stating, "True the film gives an image of a Hollywood base for the drama. Even the taking, screenplay structure and execution of scenes, less talk and more action.

He then collaborated with Puri Jagannadh in 2006 for the film Pokiri opposite Ileana D'Cruz, which was jointly produced by Jagannadh and Manjula. He received high praise for his performance, with Y. Sunita Chowdary of The Hindu opining that "Mahesh's understated performance in Pokiri allows him effortlessly to reclaim the title of a star, overshadowing his questionable career choices of late". He won his second Filmfare Award for Best Actor – Telugu for his performance in the film. That same year, his next film, Sainikudu, was released. A critic from Rediff.com wrote that "Nonetheless, Sainikudu can be watched at least for its premise of letting the warrior in each individual surface, and the fact that it is done with the idea of motivating people to do something for their fellow humans".

The following year saw Babu acting in the film Athidhi, co-starring Amrita Rao, marking her Telugu debut. The film was produced by Babu's brother Ramesh Babu. UTV Motion Pictures acquired the film's distribution rights for ₹18.5 crore, which became its first Telugu film venture. Jeevi of Idlebrain.com praised the film's first half while criticising the last thirty minutes of the film. A critic from Rediff.com wrote that the film "is built up through a 'racy' screenplay which is gripping to an extent, but stretches to three long hours".

After Athidhi's release, Babu took a break from films for seven months; two months later, he signed Khaleja, but the break was unintentionally extended for two years due to several delays. During this time, Babu's grandmother and his wife Namrata's parents died. Krishna was worried about Babu's career as the film's shoot was delayed for so long. The film deals with illegal-mining in India, and related environmental damage. It marks Babu's return as an actor after a three-year hiatus in his second collaboration with Trivikram after Athadu. Upon release, Khaleja received positive reviews from critics but was a commercial failure in India. However, it managed to perform well at the overseas box office becoming the highest grossing Telugu film at that time. Rediff gave a 3 out of 5 rating and noted "The duo of Mahesh-Trivikram delivers a product that is watchable, entertaining with good humour, couple of well-orchestrated action sequences and songs and with a bit to take home as well. It's Mahesh's show all the way, much to the delight of his fans. Mahesh is the soul of the movie, be it his dialogue delivery, his action, his dances or emotions, he is effortless. The film is included in the list of "25 Greatest Telugu Films Of The Decade" by Film Companion.

=== Established actor and stardom (2011–2017) ===
In 2011, Babu collaborated with Srinu Vaitla for the film Dookudu opposite Samantha Ruth Prabhu. For his performance in the film, Babu won his third Filmfare Award for Best Actor – Telugu, his third Nandi Award for Best Actor, and his first SIIMA Award for Best Actor (Telugu). After the film's gross crossed the ₹100 crore mark making it the highest-grossing Telugu film of that year. The Income Tax Department officials conducted a raid on Babu's Jubilee Hills residence as he was rumoured of receiving a remuneration of more than ₹12 crore for his next projects.

He later played the role of a mafia kingpin with a hidden personal agenda in the film Businessman (2012), co-starring Kajal Aggarwal. Upon the film's release, he received praise from critics for his performance in the film, with Y. Sunita Chowdary of The Hindu writing, "The film has no frills, no vulgar wastage and the hero is practically in every frame; you hear only his voice, he looks good, sounds good, he also steals the comedian's job. Mahesh plays it straight". He received his seventh nomination for the Filmfare Award for Best Actor – Telugu and his second nomination for the SIIMA Award for Best Actor (Telugu) for his performance in the film. By then, Babu was reported to be the second highest-paid actor in South India after Rajinikanth.

Babu then began filming for Srikanth Addala's Seethamma Vakitlo Sirimalle Chettu (2013), whose script Babu had approved during the pre-production phase of Dookudu. Co-starring Daggubati Venkatesh along with Anjali and Samantha Ruth Prabhu, it became the first Telugu multistarrer film to be produced in the last twenty-five years. Released in January 2013, the film became one of the highest grossing Telugu films of the year and marked the completion of Babu's hat-trick of successful films. Sangeetha Devi Dundoo of The Hindu called the film a "delightful family drama with its celebration of family bonds, love and marriage laced with laughter", and Addala "wants to leave his audience with a thought, wants them to reflect on their relationships and overlook skirmishes that can sour family bonds". Dundoo cited Guhan's cinematography as one of the film's highlights, and praised its performances. He won his fourth Filmfare Award for Best Actor – Telugu and his second SIIMA Award for Best Actor (Telugu) for his performance in the film. He provided a voice-over for Srinu Vaitla's Baadshah the same year.

Babu had two releases in 2014, the first one being Sukumar's 1: Nenokkadine, an action thriller focusing on a celebrity suffering from hallucinations related to the murder of his parents and the discovery of a special variety of rice. Babu's performance received praise, with critics calling it one of his best performances. For his performance, he received his fourth nomination for the SIIMA Award for Best Actor (Telugu).

Babu collaborated with Koratala Siva for the action drama film Srimanthudu (2015) opposite Shruti Haasan. He co-produced the film under his newly formed banner G. Mahesh Babu Entertainment Pvt. Ltd, marking his first film production venture. He opted to do so to control the film's budget, accepting a share in profits in lieu of remuneration. Released on 7 August 2015, Srimanthudu opened to positive reviews from critics, and he won his fifth Filmfare Award for Best Actor – Telugu for the film. Sethumadhavan N. of Bangalore Mirror stated, Srimanthudu wouldn't have been as effective if it did not have Babu who is at his charming best, adding that he "underplays the emotional scenes, making them a treat to watch". Babu also adopted his native village, Burripalem. Babu won third SIIMA award for best actor for his performance in the film.

In 2016, he appeared in Brahmotsavam opposite Kajal Aggarwal, Samantha Ruth Prabhu and Pranitha Subhash. Originally produced as a bi-lingual, the film would've marked Babu's first straight-out Tamil film. While the film underperformed at the box office, the Deccan Chronicle stated that Babu was its saving grace.

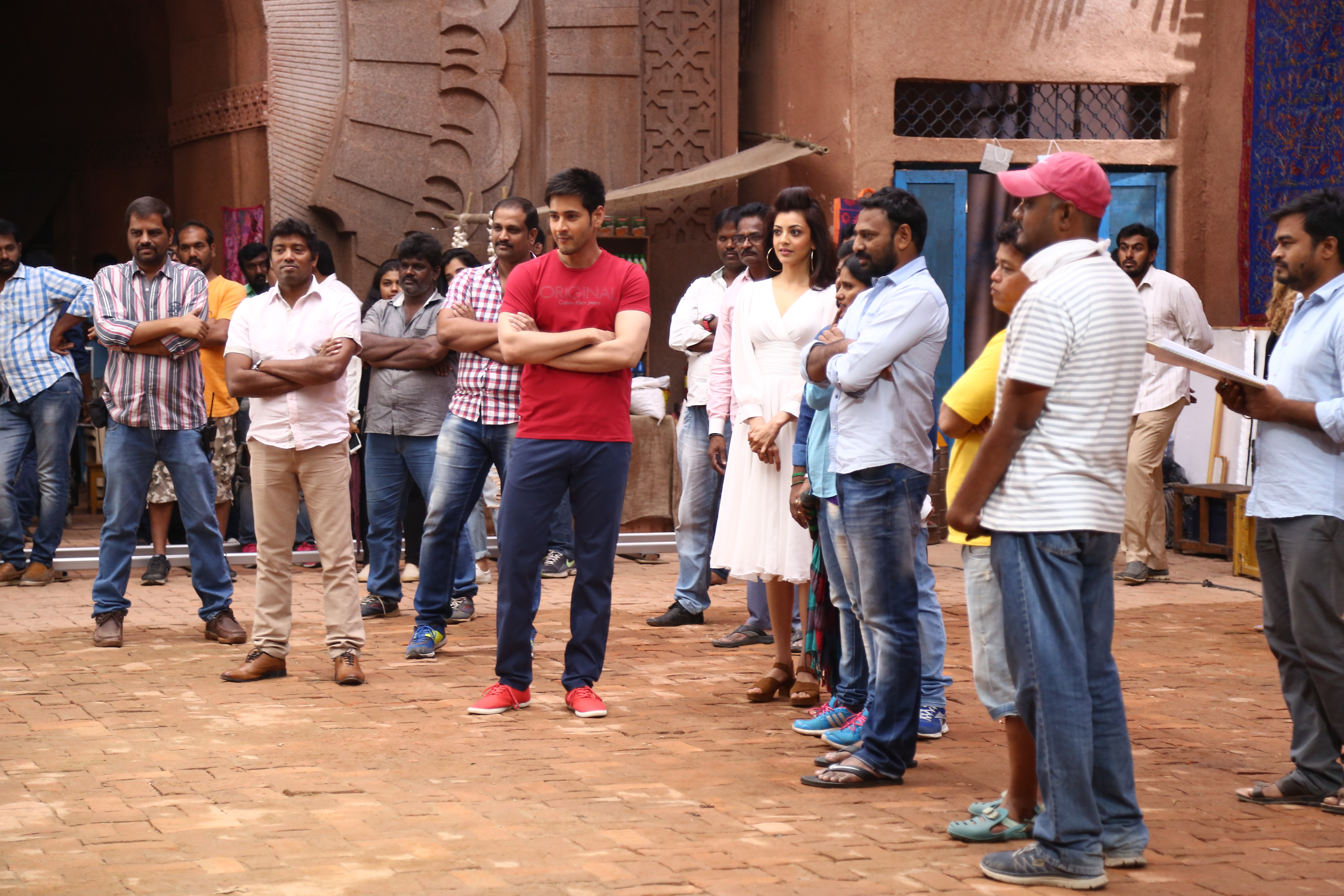
Mahesh babu on the set of Brahmotsavam

He later appeared in the Telugu-Tamil bilingual Spyder (2017), directed by A. R. Murugadoss, which finally marked his Tamil cinema debut and grossed over ₹118 crores at the box office. The film received mixed reviews, with praise for the cast performances, but criticism for its writing, screenplay and direction. Y. Sunita Chowdary of The Hindu stated that "Spyder starts off well but the director's imagination goes overboard only to turn a purpose ridden plot to a piece of travesty".

=== Continued success and career fluctuation (2018–present) ===
Babu's next film was the political action drama Bharat Ane Nenu in 2018 where he played the role of a chief minister opposite Kiara Advani. His performance in the film earned him his tenth nomination for the Filmfare Award for Best Actor – Telugu. His next film was Maharshi in 2019 opposite Pooja Hegde. Hemanth Kumar of Firstpost mentioned the film owes a lot to Babu's conviction to pull off his role and he makes you believe in his characterisation so much that it doesn't feel like fiction. Both the films were commercial success and ranks among the highest grossing Telugu films of their respective years. After the release of the film, the concept of weekend farming (also known as weekend agriculture) gained more attention. A new internet challenge. i.e. Agriculture Challenge was started, with several people do farming in the weekends. The Statesman reported that the film has created a social impact on the youth and raised awareness about the issues faced by farmers in the rural heartland. In February 2020, Rajiv Gandhi University of Knowledge Technologies organised the contest "Campus Farming". 250 students of the university participated in this contest.

Babu performed in the 2020 film Sarileru Neekevvaru opposite Rashmika Mandanna, earning him an eleventh nomination for the Filmfare Award for Best Actor – Telugu. The satellite rights of the film were sold to Gemini TV, which premiered it on 25 March 2020 for the first time on eve of Ugadi and in its first Television premier movie recorded a TRP of 23.4. Neeshita Nyayapati stated that Babu did a "good job of playing a man who will serve the country, crack jokes and protect". The film was a major commercial success, ranking as one of the highest grossing Telugu films of all time. It remains Babu's highest grossing release.

With no film in 2021, Babu's next film Sarkaru Vaari Paata, marking his maiden collaboration with director Parasuram, was released in 2022, opposite Keerthy Suresh. The film was released in May 2022 to mixed reviews from critics. Balakrishna Ganeshan of The News Minute wrote "It is great to see Mahesh Babu shedding his macho image and wooing a woman in the film. Mahesh is a delight to watch in these scenes. His comic timing and dialogue delivery are on point". Haricharan Pudipeddi of the Hindustan Times stated "Mahesh Babu offers something fresh in his latest film." A commercial success, it was one of the year's highest grossing films. Babu then produced Major under by G. Mahesh Babu Entertainment, a film based on the life of Major Sandeep Unnikrishnan who was martyred in action in the 2008 Mumbai attacks, in the same year.

With no release in 2023, Babu reunited with Trivikram Srinivas for their third collaboration in the film Guntur Kaaram, opposite Sreeleela, which was released in 2024. The movie was a financial failure and received mostly negative reviews, but Babu's performance was praised. Although his performance in the song "Kurchi Madathapetti" was widely appreciated.

Babu will next appear in S. S. Rajamouli's film Varanasi, which is scheduled for 2027 release. He also stars alongside Priyanka Chopra and Prithviraj Sukumaran in the film.

== Philanthropy ==
Babu established, "Mahesh Babu Foundation", to improve the lives of underprivileged children and communities. The foundation primarily focuses on supporting children in need by funding life-saving congenital heart surgeries. The foundation also co-runs the charitable trust and non-profit organisation "Heal A Child" in collaboration with Andhra Hospitals and Rainbow Hospitals. It also recognises the importance of education and provides scholarships to meritorious students from underprivileged backgrounds. Recognizing the need for holistic development, the Mahesh Babu Foundation adopted two villages, Burripalem in Andhra Pradesh and Siddhapuram in Telangana. In these villages, the foundation has undertaken various initiatives to improve the quality of life, including constructing schools, Anganwadi buildings, libraries, roads, and drainage systems. Additionally, they have established computer labs to equip villagers with crucial digital skills. The foundation also conducts regular medical checkups, distributes medicines to those in need, and has fully vaccinated the entire population of the adopted villages against COVID-19. Through health awareness programs, the foundation strives to empower villagers to make informed decisions about their well-being. Babu has also supported AIG Hospitals' "End Corona Campaign", which was aimed at creating awareness about the COVID-19 vaccine. It was one of the world's largest virtual awareness campaigns on the COVID-19 vaccine.

He was signed in 2013 as the goodwill ambassador of Heal-a-child Foundation, a non-profit organisation that offers financial support to the parents of terminally ill children to help with the cost of medical treatment. Babu gives 30% of his annual income to charities, and most of his philanthropic activities are unpublicised because he prefers them to be so. He joined Farhan Akhtar's Men Against Rape and Discrimination (MARD) campaign in August 2013 and lent his voice to the Telugu version of a poem written by Javed Akhtar. In October 2014, he donated ₹25 lakh to a relief fund run by the chief minister of Andhra Pradesh for reconstruction of areas destroyed during Cyclone Hudhud.

== In the media ==
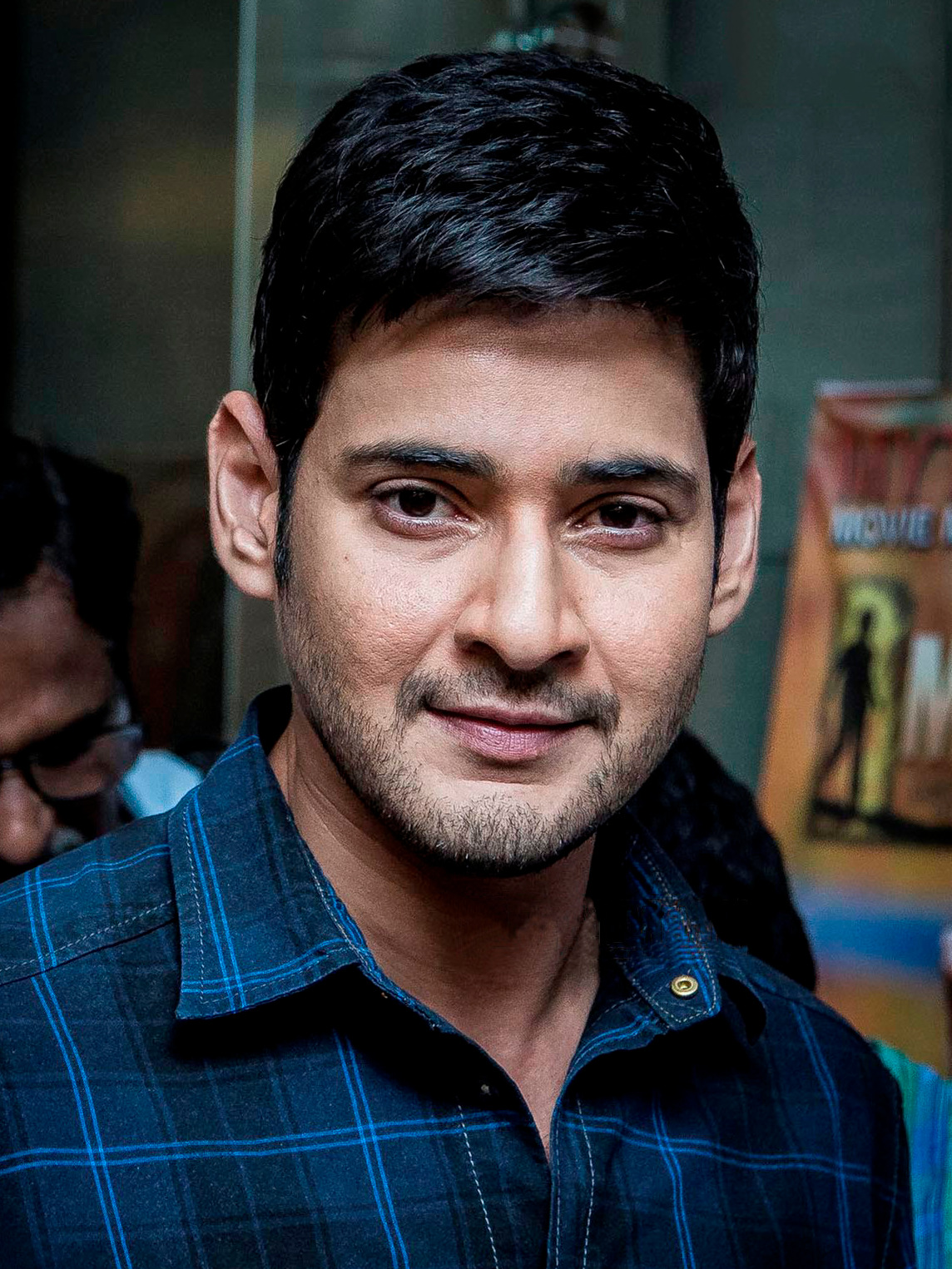
Mahesh Babu at the audio launch for Selvandhan (the Tamil dubbed version of Srimanthudu)

Babu is widely referred in the media as "Superstar", and "Prince Mahesh Babu". One of the highest paid South Indian actor, Babu stood in 31st place on Forbes India's Celebrity 100 list for the year 2012, with annual earnings of ₹42.25 crore. He slipped to 54th place on the same list for the year 2013, with his annual earnings dropping to ₹28.96 crore. In the following year, he climbed to the 30th position with an annual earning figure of ₹51 crore. In 2015, he placed 36th, the highest ranking Telugu celebrity, with an income of ₹51 crore. He was placed 37th, 33rd and 54th consecutively in the years leading up to 2019 with an annual earning of ₹35 crore.

Due to his popularity, Babu became the second most searched South Indian actor on Google, in 2022. In 2023, he became the sixth most searched South actor on the same list. Babu has appeared on Times Most Desirable Man list several times. He was ranked twelfth for the year 2010, fifth in 2011, and second in 2012. He climbed to the first position of the same list for the year 2013. He stood at sixth place on the same list for the year 2014, sixth in 2015, seventh in 2016, and sixth in 2017. In 2019, his wax statue was unveiled in Madame Tussauds Singapore. Hindustan Times reported that he was the first Telugu actor to get a wax statue at Madame Tussauds. He was also the first Indian actor whose wax statue was flown back for a day for unveiling at his hometown.

A research study conducted in 2023 by Indian Institute of Human Brands (IIHB) stated that Babu was the "most respected" in Telugu cinema. The study was based on several attributes covering image, personality and other human factors. Babu became the most tweeted-about South Indian actor in 2020. In 2021, he became the third most tweeted-about actor on the same list. Babu stood at the 11th place on Forbes India's most influential stars on Instagram in South cinema for the year 2021. As of August 2024, he is one of the most-followed Telugu actors on Instagram. Babu's has appeared in several Telugu films such as Ashta Chamma (2008), Kiraak (2014), and Superstar Kidnap (2015). Babu is a celebrity endorser for several brands such as Mountain Dew, Jos Alukkas, Emami Navaratna, PhonePe and Denver Perfume.

== Personal life ==
=== Marriage and family ===
Babu married his co-star Namrata Shirodkar on 10 February 2005 at Marriott Hotel, Mumbai during the shooting of Athadu (2005). They have a son, Gautam, and a daughter, Sitara. Gautam portrayed the younger version of Babu in 1: Nenokkadine (2014). Sitara voiced young Elsa in the Telugu dub of Frozen 2 (2019).

Mahesh is the fourth child in a family of five children. His elder brother Ramesh Babu was a film producer and was also an actor. Mahesh Babu's eldest sister Padmavathi is married to Galla Jayadev, an industrialist and Member of the Indian Parliament from the Telugu Desam Party. His elder sister Manjula is a film producer, director, and an actress. Priyadarshini, his younger sister, is married to Sudheer Babu, who later made his debut as an actor in Telugu cinema.

=== Legal issues ===
In September 2004, Babu and director Gunasekhar attended a rally organised by his fans at Warangal for the promotional activities of Arjun. He and his fans allegedly raided two video libraries and assaulted their owners who were circulating unauthorised CDs of the film. Cases under IPC section 448 (criminal trespass), section 427 (mischief) and section 366 (kidnap) were registered on him, who was the principal accused, and five others. Later, a delegation from the Telugu film industry, including his father Krishna, Chiranjeevi, Nagarjuna, Allu Aravind and D. Suresh Babu, approached the then chief minister Y. S. Rajasekhara Reddy to intervene in this case. Regarding the issue, Babu said that while cases were booked against him on "the basis of wrong information," not a single case had been booked against the person dealing in bootlegged CDs, which he found the "funniest" thing. Actor Pawan Kalyan openly supported Babu throughout the episode. Babu surrendered in the district court in September 2004 and appeared before the court again in April 2006. Babu and the others were exonerated after the final hearing in July 2006.

He was summoned by the Enforcement Directorate (ED) on 28 April 2025, for questioning regarding alleged money laundering by Sai Surya Developers and the Surana Group.

== Accolades ==
Babu is a recipient of nine Nandi Awards (the highest for any individual), five Filmfare South Awards, two Gaddar Telangana Film Awards, three CineMAA Awards, three Santosham Film Awards, four SIIMA Awards and one IIFA Utsavam Award.
