= Men Against Rape and Discrimination =

2013 Indian social campaign and organization

- Logo of Men Against Rape and Discrimination (MARD)
- Founded: March 2013
- Founder: Farhan Akhtar
- Type: Social campaign
- Location: India

Men Against Rape and Discrimination (MARD/M.A.R.D) is a 2013 social campaign launched by India film director and actor Farhan Akhtar. The word "MARD" ("Mard"; Hindi: मर्द, English: Man) has been used in the short form of the campaign name. The campaign aims to raise social awareness against rape and discrimination of women.

From its launch, the campaign became a topic of discussion in several social networking sites and has received positive feedback from actors like Shahrukh Khan, Priyanka Chopra, Arjun Rampal, and Hrithik Roshan.

== History ==
Akhtar conceived MARD after an incident in August 2012. Pallavi Purkayastha, a Mumbai lawyer, was brutally murdered by her watchman for fighting for her dignity because he tried to sexually assault her. Akhtar launched his campaign in March 2013.

=== Initiatives ===
If you are a man who respects women... her rights, her dignity, her independence, her mind, her body, her life... you are a #MARD.

— Farhan Akhtar at Twitter, 9:03 PM, 9 March 2013 (IST)

In March 2013, Akhtar performed at a college concert in Bangalore wearing a t-shirt with MARD's logo. He also attempted to popularize this campaign using social networking sites. The tweets posted by Akhtar were hugely popular. In an interview, Akhtar stated that he wanted to bring the campaign to education institutions, such as schools and colleges, "to drive home the message that women need to be respected."

Farhan Akhtar, who initiated the social campaign, was also seen promoting the cause at Indian Premiere League season six where he distributed 70,000 moustaches among the audience on 26 April 2013 at Eden Gardens, Kolkata during the Kolkata Knight Riders vs Kings XI Punjab match in support of the initiative. This initiative was supported by Adam Gilchrist, Gautam Gambhir, Shaan, and many others who sported the moustache in the stadium.

Actor Mahesh Babu and cricketer Sachin Tendulkar joined the initiative in June 2013. Both Mahesh Babu and Sachin Tendulkar lent their voice to record a poem, written by Farhan's father Javed Akhtar.

== Reactions ==
After its launch, the campaign became a trending topic on different social networking sites, including Twitter and Facebook. The initiative received positive feedback and support from many artists, including Shahrukh Khan, Priyanka Chopra, Mahesh Babu, Arjun Rampal, Hrithik Roshan, Shahid Kapoor, Vidya Balan and Mukesh Officials etc. Akhtar's tweets were actively re-tweeted by Priyanka Chopra, Arjun Rampal, Sonam Kapoor and Shabana Azmi.

== See also ==
- 2012 Delhi gang rape case
- Criminal Law (Amendment) Ordinance, 2013
