= Gopi (2006 Kannada film) =

2006 Indian film

- Directed by: G K Mudduraj
- Written by: B A Madhu (dialogue)
- Based on: Murari (Telugu)
- Produced by: Byre Gowda
- Starring: Murali; Gowri Munjal
- Cinematography: M R Seenu
- Edited by: Vinod Manohar
- Music by: Songs: Mani Sharma; Score: K. Kalyan
- Production company: Bhavya Cine Creations
- Release date: 22 February 2006
- Country: India
- Language: Kannada

Gopi is a 2006 Indian Kannada-language family drama film directed by G K Mudduraj and starring Murali and Gowri Munjal. The film is a remake of Murari (2001).

== Cast ==
- Murali as Gopi
- Gowri Munjal
- Loknath
- Ashok
- Doddanna
- Sathyajith
- Umashree
- Sumithra
- Tulasi
- Sarigama Viji
- Karibasavaiah
- Tennis Krishna

== Soundtrack ==
The songs were composed by Mani Sharma, who reused all tunes from the original film. The background score was done by K. Kalyan, who also wrote the lyrics. The audio rights were bagged by Anand Audio.

Track listing
No.	Title	Singer(s)	Length
1.	"Dum Dum Dholu"	Shankar Mahadevan	4:44
2.	"Mister Mister"	Manjula Gururaj, Vijay Aras	4:31
3.	"Mallige Mallige"	Badri Prasad, Vidya	6:13
4.	"Yenaithu Yenaithu"	Ramya	4:50
5.	"Rangena Halli"	Udit Narayan	5:02
6.	"Maleyu Idhe"	Shankar Mahadevan	4:47
Total length:			30:10

== Reception ==
R. G. Vijayasarathy of Rediff.com wrote that "Give it a miss if you're not an ardent Murali Dev fan". The film was reviewed by Deccan Herald.
