= Anna Thammudu (1990 film) =

Anna Thamudu
- Theatrical release poster
- Directed by: Krishna
- Written by: Tripuraneni Maharadhi (dialogues)
- Screenplay by: Krishna
- Story by: Sainath Thotapalli
- Produced by: Krishna
- Starring: Krishna; Mahesh Babu; Gautami
- Cinematography: Pushpala Gopi Krishna
- Edited by: Krishna
- Music by: Raj–Koti
- Production company: Padmalaya Studios
- Release date: 27 July 1990
- Running time: 126 minutes
- Country: India
- Language: Telugu

Anna Thammudu (transl. Elder brother and younger brother) is a 1990 Indian Telugu-language action drama film, produced and directed by Krishna under his Padmalaya Studios banner. The film stars Krishna alongside his son Mahesh Babu and Gautami, with music composed by Raj–Koti.

== Cast ==
- Krishna as Raja Krishna Prasad
- Mahesh Babu as Murali
- Gautami as Rani Padmini
- J. V. Somayajulu as Vasudeva Prasad
- Prabhakar Reddy as Yugandhar Rao
- Giri Babu as Seshagiri
- Vijayachander as Raja Mahendra Pratap
- Sarathi as Gantaiah
- Jeeva as Jeeva
- K. R. Vijaya as Rajeswari Devi
- Anjana as Sudha
- Kuyili as item number

== Soundtrack ==
Anna Thamudu

Film score by Raj–Koti
- Released: 1990
- Genre: Soundtrack
- Length: 29:50
- Label: His Master's Voice
- Producer: Raj–Koti

Raj–Koti chronology
| Koduku Didina Kapuram (1989) | Anna Thamudu (1990) | Vishnu (1990) |

Music composed by Raj–Koti. Music released on His Master's Voice.

| S. No. | Song title | Lyrics | Singers | length |
|---|---|---|---|---|
| 1 | "Maangu Bhalaa" | Veturi | Chitra | 5:00 |
| 2 | "Theerikeppudu" | Veturi | S. P. Balasubrahmanyam, P. Susheela | 5:11 |
| 3 | "Lucky Star" | Sirivennela Sitarama Sastry | Chitra | 5:31 |
| 4 | "Oosuponi" | Sirivennela Sitarama Sastry | Mano, P. Susheela | 4:53 |
| 5 | "Puttu Puttu Aa" | Veturi | Mano, P. Susheela, Chitra | 4:20 |
| 6 | "Kadupaara" | Sirivennela Sitarama Sastry | Mano, Chitra | 4:55 |
