= Murari (2001 film) =

2001 Telugu film by Krishna Vamsi

- Film poster
- Directed by: Krishna Vamsi
- Written by: Story & Screenplay: Krishna Vamsi; Dialogues: Sobhan
- Produced by: N Devi Prasad; Ramalingeswara Rao; Gopi Nandigam
- Starring: Mahesh Babu; Sonali Bendre; Lakshmi; Sukumari; Kaikala Satyanarayana; Gollapudi Maruthi Rao
- Cinematography: C. Ramprasad
- Edited by: Krishna Vamsi
- Music by: Mani Sharma
- Production company: Ram Prasad Arts
- Release date: 17 February 2001
- Running time: 170 minutes
- Country: India
- Language: Telugu
- Budget: ₹5 crore
- Box office: ₹13 crores distributors' share

Murari is a 2001 Indian Telugu-language supernatural romantic family drama film written and directed by Krishna Vamsi. It stars Mahesh Babu and Sonali Bendre in the lead roles, while Lakshmi, Sukumari, Satyanarayana and Gollapudi Maruthi Rao play supporting roles. The film features music composed by Mani Sharma and cinematography by Ram Prasad. It marks the Telugu debut of Sonali Bendre and action choreographer Peter Hein. Additionally, it serves as the final on-screen appearance of veteran actor Dhulipala.

The film follows Murari, a carefree young man from a zamindar family plagued by a generational curse from Goddess Durga since the mid-19th century. Every 48 years, the male heir succumbs to the curse in their early 30s despite numerous rituals to break it. Murari, the current heir, must confront and overcome the curse through his spiritual resolve.

Murari was released on 17 February 2001 to positive reviews and emerged as a commercial success, with a distributor's share of ₹13 crore. It was a comeback for Babu after the failures of his previous movies, Yuvaraju and Vamsi. The film won three Nandi Awards, including Second Best Feature Film. It was later remade in Kannada as Gopi (2006) and inspired the Tamil film Pudhiya Geethai (2003), starring Vijay. Murari was re released on the occasion of Mahesh Babu's 49th birthday on August 9, 2024 where it earned an additional ₹9 crore in its run.

== Plot ==
In the 19th century, a greedy alcoholic zamindar attempts to steal a panchaloha idol of the principal deity, Durga, from a temple during the inauspicious Amavasya phase. The zamindar, who hoped to repay his loans from the British, is killed along with the Britishers, and the goddess curses his family, resulting in the deaths of the male heirs every forty-eight years.

In 2001, Murari, the youngest child of the zamindar's family, is the next heir to face the curse. His mother has died, and his paternal grandmother Sabari, who lost her husband due to the curse forty-eight years ago, is concerned for Murari's safety. Murari is loved and respected by his family, which includes his father Sathipandu, his grandmother Sabari, and his elder brothers Seenayya, Baachi, and Soori, along with their wives and children. Murari is especially close to his eldest sister-in-law Gopi, whom he admires deeply.

Murari’s family is estranged from Gopi’s maternal family, headed by her uncle and foster father Chanti, due to issues caused by Chanti's alcoholic son, Rambabu, during Gopi's wedding. As a result, Gopi is allowed to visit her family alone, and the rest of the family avoids contact with them. Vasundhara "Vasu", Chanti's daughter, is an agricultural student who has come to the city to study. Murari believes that Gopi has refrained from having children to avoid the possibility of losing her affection for him.

Murari accompanies Gopi to her village to bring her happiness, and there, he flirts with Vasu and falls in love with her. After a confrontation with Rambabu, Murari returns home while Gopi stays behind to complete some rituals. Meanwhile, Murari’s family priest realises that Murari is the next intended victim of the curse but keeps this knowledge from Sabari. Vasu leaves for Hyderabad, missing Murari. Upon the insistence of Sathipandu, who is aware of Murari's feelings for Vasu, Murari follows her to Hyderabad. He confesses his love for her, and Vasu, unbeknownst to her family, agrees to stay with Murari and his family under the pretext of conducting research, as part of Sathipandu's plan. Over time, Murari successfully convinces his family to accept his relationship with Vasu.

When Murari informs Sabari about his wish to marry Vasu, Sabari is initially about to accept, but the family priest reveals the truth about the curse and warns her that Murari will die and Vasu would be widowed at a young age. Sabari, fearing the consequences, objects to the marriage without revealing the reason. Misinterpreting Sabari's last-minute decision to be an act of revenge for the family feud, Rambabu quickly arranges for Vasu to marry Bullabayi, a greedy man. In the meantime, Sabari has Murari perform several rituals to counter the curse. Chanti, arriving at the temple, informs everyone about Vasu's impending marriage.

Murari decides to rescue Vasu but is stopped by Sabari. The family accuses her of using Vasu to seek revenge on the other family due to their feud. At this point, the priest reveals the truth about the curse and Sabari's efforts to protect Murari. Shocked by the revelation, the family supports Murari's decision to save Vasu. Murari sets out to rescue Vasu, who escapes with the help of her mother and other women. As Murari attempts to save Vasu from Bullabayi, he is stabbed by him. Despite his injury, Murari continues his journey to the temple, carrying an unconscious Vasu, to complete the necessary Abhishekam ritual.

Soori learns of Murari’s injury and arranges for medical treatment, without informing the family. Rambabu later attacks Murari, but during the struggle, the idol of Durga undergoes Rakthabhishekam, an offering of blood, as Murari carries the idol. Vasu regains consciousness and informs Gopi that Murari was stabbed. Murari completes the ritual and faints, but his condition worsens.

In a desperate attempt to save Murari, Sabari sacrifices herself by drowning in the river, offering herself as a sacrifice to satisfy the goddess. As a result, the curse is lifted, and Murari recovers. In the aftermath, Murari and Vasu marry, seeking blessings from the goddess and from Sabari's portrait.

== Cast ==
- Mahesh Babu as Murari
- Sonali Bendre as Vasundhara "Vasu", Murari's love interest later turned into wife (Voice-over by S. P. Sailaja)
- Lakshmi as Gopala "Gopi" Krishna Maheswari, Murari's eldest sister-in-law and adoptive mother
- Sukumari as Sabari, Murari's paternal grandmother
- Kaikala Satyanarayana as Sathipandu, Murari's father
- Gollapudi Maruthi Rao as Chanti, Vasu's father and Gopi's foster father
- Annapurna as Chanti's wife and Vasu's mother
- Sudha as Ammulu, Gopi and Vasu's cousin
- Prasad Babu as Seenayya, Murari's eldest brother and Gopi's husband
- Sivaji Raja as Soori, Murari's third eldest brother
- Anitha Chowdary as Soori's wife and Murari's third eldest sister-in-law
- Chinna as Baachi, Murari's second eldest brother
- Hema as Baachi's wife and Murari's second eldest sister-in-law
- Raghu Babu as Rambabu, Vasu's brother and Gopi's foster brother
- Gundu Sudarshan as Gundu, Murari's friend
- Ravi Babu as Bullabbayi, Vasu's cousin
- Lakshmipati as Vaali, Bullabbayi's sidekick
- Dhulipala as a sage
- Prakash Raj as a zamindar, Murari's ancestor who tried to steal the idol of Durga
- M. S. Narayana as the zamindar's clerk who tried to stop him
- Naga Babu as Murari's ancestor
- Achyuth as Sabari's husband and Murari's paternal grandfather
- Alphonsa (special appearance in the song "Dum Dum Dum")

== Production ==
=== Development ===
When Krishna Vamsi visited a temple in a village, he learned a famous resident there whose three sons died under suspicious circumstances at regular intervals four years ago. When he spoke to the local people, they said that the man killed a worker from lower cadre by hiring some goons and the wife of that murdered person came to this person's house and cursed that all his three sons would be dying within six months. After listening to them, he was intrigued by all these incidents. As a part of his research, he visited temples and observed the architecture, sculptures and also read books like Autobiography of a Yogi.

He said in an interview, "I met highly qualified people like Sirivennela Sitaramasastri to enhance my knowledge in various things. I also studied the visions of our ancestors, who during their time have designed things like missiles, television, aircrafts [sic] etc." He added, "We always have an answer for any questions that start with 'what', 'how' and 'when'. But we do not have any reason or answer for questions starting with 'why'. I had this kind of backdrop in my mind and wanted to make a film. When a film in the combination of Mahesh Babu and Krishna Vamsi was announced, I though I should make all those mystic questions get a representation in this film." He wanted to incorporate Telugu culture and tradition with a festive mood and thus used a joint-family backdrop.

Influenced by Hrishikesh Mukherjee's 1971 film Anand, Krishna Vamsi wanted to kill Mahesh Babu's character in this film as he felt that except Anand, no other film introduced a hero who would be dying very soon. During the story discussions, when he said the same to his team, none accepted. He aimed to go in reverse trend and form the film's screenplay as story writers used to create a problem and then introduced the hero to solve it in Telugu cinema. After meeting Mahesh Babu, Krishna Vamsi decided to use the story of Krishna for the family part. He clarified that it was not a true adaptation of Lord Krishna's life but he got inspired by the characterizations in Krishna's story.

According to Krishna Vamsi, the near-death situations Murari faces in the film are inspired from the attacks of rakshasas on Krishna and the fatal attack in the climax was inspired from Lord Krishna's death in the hands of a Yadava hunter. Sri Sita Ramachandra Swamy temple at Ammapally near Shamshabad was selected for filming key scenes related to the curse part of the story and the temple gained prominence after the film's release. A strong belief in the film industry emerged that a film with scenes shot at the temple will do well at the box-office.

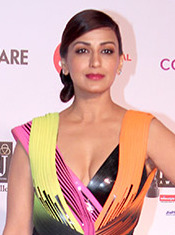
Sonali Bendre made her debut in Telugu cinema.

=== Casting ===
Mahesh Babu acknowledged that this film was a crucial one in his career and noted in 2012 that the character of Murari was his favourite role. Sonali Bendre made her debut in Telugu with this film and it was her first collaboration with Krishna Vamsi. She has learned to speak Telugu for the film. Lakshmi, Kaikala Satyanarayana, Prasad Babu, Gollapudi Maruthi Rao, Deekshitulu and Raghu Babu were a part of the film's principal cast. Ravi Babu played a negative role in the film. Actress Sukumari was selected to play the character of Sabari, Mahesh Babu's grandmother in the film which was one of her widely remembered roles in Telugu cinema. Veteran film actor and religious guru Dhulipala Seetarama Sastry made a cameo appearance which was his last film. Prakash Raj played a cameo as the evil zamindar who was the first victim of the curse while Deekshitulu played the role of the temple's priest named Seshayya.

The film also marks the debut of action choreographer Peter Hein in Telugu cinema.

=== Filming ===
The film was extensively shot in Ramachandrapuram, Andhra Pradesh. It was shot for nearly 50 days in the region. The temple scenes featured in the opening shots were filmed at the Ammapalli Sri Sita Rama Chandra Swamy which is nearby Hyderabad.

=== Characters ===
Regarding Mahesh's character in the film, Krishna Vamsi said, "During that time, I met Mahesh Babu a couple of times. He has a 'mugdha manohara mohana roopam' meaning that Mahesh has very beautiful look which can mesmerize anyone. I was impressed to such an extent that I wanted to add 'Krishna tatvam' to that film, as 'mugdha manohara mohana roopam' is the first quality of Lord Krishna. Just like the way Krishna had herd of cows, hero in this film had an animal (elephant). I wanted to create the atmosphere of Brundavanam. That's the reason why Mahesh is shown to be moving along with and surrounded by girls/women and kids."

Sonali Bendre's characterization in the first half was based on Satyabhama and her characterization in the second half was based on Rukmini. Because of that, Krishna Vamsi incorporated a scene similar to Rukmini Kalyanam (Lord Krishna takes Rukmini away from her place and marries her without the knowledge of her people) in the second half where Murari's character saves Vasundhara from her evil brother and takes away her from her village to marry her.

Lakshmi's character was based on Yasoda while Prasad Babu and Kaikala Satyanarayana's roles were partially inspired from Balarama's character. According to Krishna Vamsi, the other Yadavas in the film were the brothers and family members of hero while Ravi Babu's character was a mix of characterizations of Sisupala, Karna and Duryodhana. Two separated joint families like that of Pandavas and Kauravas were created though they are on good terms unlike the way portrayed in Lord Krishna's story.

== Music ==
Murari

Soundtrack album Murari by Mani Sharma
- Released: 2001; 2013
- Genre: Feature film soundtrack
- Length: 36:05
- Language: Telugu
- Labels: Supreme Audio (2001); Aditya Music (2013)
- Producer: Mani Sharma

Mani Sharma chronology
| Devi Putrudu (2001) | Murari (2001) | Kushi (2001) |

The songs and background score were composed by Mani Sharma. The album consisted of seven tracks. The soundtrack featured singers S. P. Balasubrahmanyam, K. S. Chitra, Jikki, Shankar Mahadevan, Udit Narayan, S. P. B. Charan, Sunitha, Anuradha Sriram and Harini. The lyrics were written by Veturi, Sirivennela Sitarama Sastry, Chandrabose, and Suddala Ashok Teja.

Except for "Alanati Ramachandrudu", Mani Sharma retained all tunes in the Kannada remake Gopi (2006).

Track Listing
| No. | Title | Lyrics | Singer(s) | Length |
|---|---|---|---|---|
| 1. | "Alanati Ramachandrudu" | Sirivennela Seetharama Sastry | Jikki, Sunitha, Sandhya | 5:21 |
| 2. | "Bhama Bhama" | Sirivennela Seetharama Sastry | S. P. Balasubrahmanyam, Anuradha Sriram | 4:30 |
| 3. | "Cheppamma Cheppamma" | Sirivennela Seetharama Sastry | K. S. Chithra | 4:49 |
| 4. | "Ekkada Ekkada" | Sirivennela Seetharama Sastry | S. P. Charan, Harini | 6:12 |
| 5. | "Andaanikey" | Chandrabose | Shankar Mahadevan | 5:24 |
| 6. | "Bangaru Kalla" | Suddala Ashok Teja | Udit Narayan | 5:01 |
| 7. | "Dum Dum Dum" | Veturi | Shankar Mahadevan | 4:45 |
| Total length: | | | | 36:02 |

== Release ==
Murari was released in theatres on 17 February 2001. The satellite television rights of the film were acquired by Gemini TV. Subsequently it was later made available on digital streaming platform Sun NXT. It was re-released on 9 August 2024, coinciding with Mahesh Babu's birthday.

=== Re-Release ===
It was re-released with a remastered 4K quality on the occasion of Mahesh Babu’s 49th birthday, on 9 August 2024. It went on to collect ₹5.4 crores on the first day and ₹9.12 crores in the final run, making it the highest-grosser in Telugu cinema among re-releases, till it was surpassed by the re-release of Khaleja on 30 May 2025.

== Reception ==
=== Critical reception ===
The film received positive reviews. Jeevi of Idlebrain.com rated the film 3.5/5 stating, "The credit for the success or failure of this film should go to Krishna Vamsi. This film is bound get a little bit of dissent from the viewers of C class areas. But, this film is classic masterpiece for the class audience and highly recommended for the Mahesh and Krishnavamsi fans. This film will be a good fare for the people if they watch this film with no expectations. Just watch this film to experience Krishna Vamsi paint the silver screen with his classic strokes."

A critic from Sify wrote that "Director Krishna Vamsi won the appreciation of all sections of viewers with blockbuster Ninne Pelladutha while his other films catered to specific sections.With Murari he again reminds you of Nine..since it revolves around two lovable big families and boy and girl of these two families fall in love and a past misunderstanding between the two families forms a hitch between the lovers. In this Vamsi goes bit far and fuses in a mystery revolving around a goddess who has eliminated the three generations for trying to usurp her wealth and fourth generation Mahesh is destined to die. Both Mahesh and Sonali Bendre look charming and Mahesh is in his elements as light-hearted prankster".

A critic from fullhyd.com rated the film 8/10 stating "Murari starts off on a good note with the desecration of the temple by Prakash Raj for money, and builds up an interesting story as to how three members of their family cursed by Devi Maa give up their lives. But the story soon loses its steam as we know for sure the sacrificial lamb. Murari is a typical Hum Aapke Hain Kaun kind of film with all the fun and laughter and the goodness among the people. It is good family movie with best cinematography and best performance by artists."

== Accolades ==
| Award (Note: Awards, festivals and organizations are in alphabetical order.) | Date of ceremony (Note: Date is linked to the article about the awards held that year, wherever possible.) | Category | Recipient(s) | Result | Ref. |
|---|---|---|---|---|---|
| Filmfare Awards South | 20 April 2002 | Best Film – Telugu | Gopi Nandigam and Ramalingeswara Rao | Nominated | |
| Filmfare Awards South | 20 April 2002 | Best Director – Telugu | Krishna Vamsi | Nominated | |
| Filmfare Awards South | 20 April 2002 | Best Actor – Telugu | Mahesh Babu | Nominated | |
| Filmfare Awards South | 20 April 2002 | Best Actress – Telugu | Sonali Bendre | Nominated | |
| Filmfare Awards South | 20 April 2002 | Best Music Director – Telugu | Mani Sharma | Nominated | |
| Nandi Awards | 2001 | Second Best Feature Film–Silver | Producers: Gopi Nandigam and Ramalingeswara Rao; Director: Krishna Vamsi; Actors: Mahesh Babu, Sonali Bendre | Won | |
| Nandi Awards | 2001 | Best Character Actress | Lakshmi | Won | |
| Nandi Awards | 2001 | Special Jury Award | Mahesh Babu | Won | |
