= Sankharavam (1987 film) =

Indian action film

- Theatrical release poster
- Directed by: Krishna
- Written by: Paruchuri Brothers (story / dialogues)
- Screenplay by: Krishna
- Produced by: U. Suryanarayana Babu; Krishna (presents)
- Starring: Krishna; Bhanupriya; Rajani; Mahesh Babu
- Cinematography: Pushpala Gopikrishna
- Edited by: Krishna
- Music by: Bappi Lahari; Raj–Koti (background score)
- Production company: Padmavathi Films
- Release date: 16 July 1987
- Running time: 122 mins
- Country: India
- Language: Telugu

Sankharavam is a 1987 Indian Telugu-language action film directed by Krishna. It stars Krishna, Bhanupriya, Rajani, and Mahesh Babu. The film was produced by U. Suryanarayana Babu under the Padmavathi Films banner. Songs were composed by Bappi Lahiri, while Raj–Koti composed the background score.

== Cast ==
- Krishna as Vijay & Vikram (dual role)
- Bhanupriya as Jyothi
- Rajani as Inspector Sobharani
- Mahesh Babu as Raja
- Charan Raj as Pruthvipathi
- Giri Babu as Uday
- Ranganath as S.P. Kulakarni
- Thyagaraju as D.I.G.
- Vinod as Z
- Mikkilineni as Meesala Pedda Venkataramaiah
- P. J. Sarma as Church Father
- Mada as Ponnu Swamy
- Annapurna as Mahalakshmi
- Maheeja as Damarakalakshmi
- Sandhya as Rekha
- Master V.K.Naveen
- Baby Priya as Priya

== Music ==
Sankharavam

Film score by Bappi Lahari
- Released: 1987
- Genre: Soundtrack
- Length: 24:53
- Label: LEO Audio
- Producer: Bappi Lahari

Songs were composed by Bappi Lahiri. Lyrics are written by Veturi. Music released on LEO Audio Company.

S. No.	Song title	Singers	Length
1	"Katekote Teche Ante"	Raj Seetaram, P. Susheela	4:45
2	"Sambho Siva Sambho"	Raj Seetaram, P. Susheela	5:01
3	"Bandhama Anubandhama"	Raj Seetaram, P. Susheela	6:23
4	"Ahoo Ahoo"	Raj Seetaram, P. Susheela	4:02
5	"Nava Bharatha"	Raj Seetaram	4:42
