= Siddhapuram, Nalgonda district =

Siddhapuram
- Village
- Location in Telangana, India
- Coordinates: 17°26′13″N 79°08′20″E
- Country: India
- State: Telangana

Languages
  - Official: Telugu
- Time zone: UTC+5:30 (IST)

Siddhapuram is a village in Yadadri Bhuvanagiri district in Telangana, India. It falls under Atmakur mandal. There is a popular temple called as Sri Sita Ramanjaneya Swamy Temple in the village.
