= Gudachari 117 =

- Theatrical release poster
- Directed by: Kodi Ramakrishna
- Written by: Satyanand (dialogues)
- Screenplay by: Kodi Ramakrishna
- Story by: SVKM Unit
- Produced by: C. H. Gandhi; D. Murali
- Starring: Krishna; Bhanupriya; Mahesh Babu
- Cinematography: K. S. Hari
- Edited by: Suresh Tata
- Music by: Chakravarthy
- Production company: Sree Vijay Kalyan Movies
- Release date: 21 April 1989
- Running time: 132 mins
- Country: India
- Language: Telugu

Gudachari 117 (transl. Agent 117) is a 1989 Indian Telugu-language spy film directed by Kodi Ramakrishna. It stars Krishna, Bhanupriya, Mahesh Babu with music composed by Chakravarthy. The film was produced by C. H. Gandhi and D. Murali under the Sree Vijay Kalyan Movies banner. It was a commercial success, and had a 100-day theatrical run at the box office.

== Plot ==
The film begins with 4 scientists who come up with a plan to create a powerful satellite, however, they are kidnapped by a terrorist organization. The rest of the story revolves around the protection of scientists and restoring the satellite by Chandrakanth, Secret Agent 117.

== Cast ==
- Krishna as Chandrakanth, Secret Agent 117
- Bhanupriya as Jhansi & Rekha (dual role)
- Mahesh Babu as Chinna
- Murali Mohan as D.I.G. Bhargav
- Gollapudi Maruthi Rao as Gajakarnam
- Giri Babu as Gookarnam
- Ahuti Prasad as Vinod
- Chalasani Krishna Rao as Supremo
- C. S. Rao as Pilot
- Chakrapani as Co-Pilot
- Bhimeswara Rao as Scientist Sarma
- Baby Raasi as Baby

== Soundtrack ==
Gudachari 117

Film score by Chakravarthy
- Released: 1989
- Genre: Soundtrack
- Length: 23:36
- Label: AMC Audio
- Producer: Chakravarthy

Chakravarthy chronology
Vijay (1989)	Gudachari 117 (1989)	Attaku Yamudu Ammayiki Mogudu (1989)

Music composed by Chakravarthy. Lyrics were written by Veturi. The music released on AMC Audio Company.

S. No.	Song title	Singers	length
1	"Jantharki Rajani"	S. P. Balasubrahmanyam	3:44
2	"Thelladoralu"	S. P. Sailaja	4:01
3	"Poothotala Puvvueruku"	S. P. Balasubrahmanyam, S. Janaki, S.P. Sailaja	4:15
4	"Vasotha Bang Bang"	S. P. Sailaja	4:03
5	"Devudu Chaatuna"	S. P. Balasubrahmanyam, S. P. Shailaja	3:16
6	"Naginilaga Nannalukove"	S. P. Balasubrahmanyam, S. Janaki	4:17
