= Poratam =

- Theatrical release poster
- Directed by: Kodi Ramakrishna
- Written by: Paruchuri Brothers (dialogues)
- Screenplay by: S. Ramachandra Rao
- Story by: Kodi Ramakrishna
- Produced by: S. Ramachandra Rao
- Starring: Krishna; Jaya Sudha; Master Mahesh Babu
- Cinematography: Pushpala Gopi Krishna
- Edited by: Kotagiri Gopal Rao
- Music by: Chakravarthy
- Production company: SR Films
- Release date: 9 December 1983
- Running time: 138 mins
- Country: India
- Language: Telugu

Poratam (transl. Battle) is a 1983 Telugu-language action drama film directed by Kodi Ramakrishna. It stars Krishna, Jayasudha and Mahesh Babu, with music composed by Chakravarthy. It is produced by S. Ramachandra Rao under the SR Films banner.

== Plot ==
A young man seeks to end a family feud and bring justice to his paternal aunt who had served prison time on false charges of murder.

== Cast ==
- Krishna as Krishna Murthy
- Jaya Sudha as Sudha
- Master Mahesh Babu as Bujji
- Rao Gopal Rao as Nagabhushana Rao
- Gollapudi Maruthi Rao as Garupmantha Rao
- Jaggayya as Lawyer Chandra Shekar
- Kanta Rao as Ranganayakulu
- Siva Krishna as Murari
- Rajendra Prasad as Tailor Appa Rao
- P. L. Narayana as Varma
- Raj Varma as Chandram
- Dr. Siva Prasad as Gurunatham
- Sharada as Rajani Devi / Rajamma
- Anjali Devi as Parvathi
- Poornima as Nalini
- Srilakshmi as Gajalakshmi

== Music ==
Poratam

Film score by Chakravarthy
- Released: 1983
- Genre: Soundtrack
- Length: 25:16
- Label: AVM Audio
- Producer: Chakravarthy

Chakravarthy chronology
| Praja Rajyam (1983) | Poratam (1983) | Iddaru Dongalu (1984) |

Music was composed by Chakravarthy. Audio soundtrack was released on AVM Audio Company label.

| S. No. | Song title | Lyrics | Singers | length |
|---|---|---|---|---|
| 1 | "Idi Aadimanavudi" | Rajashri | S. P. Balasubrahmanyam | 4:32 |
| 2 | "Arey Ranga Ranga" | Veturi | S. P. Balasubrahmanyam, P. Susheela | 4:04 |
| 3 | "Ey Devullu" | Acharya Aatreya | S. P. Balasubrahmanyam | 3:59 |
| 4 | "Pakkaku Vasthava" | Veturi | S. P. Balasubrahmanyam, P. Susheela | 4:01 |
| 5 | "Inti Kaada Cheppaledu" | Veturi | P. Susheela | 4:16 |
| 6 | "Ey Devullu" (Sad) | Acharya Aatreya | S. P. Balasubrahmanyam, S. P. Sailaja | 4:24 |
