= Koduku Diddina Kapuram =

- Movie Poster
- Directed by: Krishna
- Written by: Paruchuri Brothers (dialogues)
- Screenplay by: Krishna
- Story by: Bhishetty Lakshmana Rao
- Produced by: Krishna
- Starring: Krishna; Vijayashanti; Mahesh Babu
- Cinematography: Pushpala Gopi Krishna
- Edited by: Krishna
- Music by: Raj–Koti
- Production company: Padmalaya Studios
- Release date: 21 September 1989
- Running time: 126 mins
- Country: India
- Language: Telugu

Koduku Diddina Kapuram (transl. Family Set Right by Son) is a 1989 Telugu-language action drama film, produced and directed by Krishna under his Padmalaya Studios banner. It stars Krishna, Vijayashanti, Mahesh Babu and music composed by Raj–Koti. Mahesh Babu played a dual role for the first time as a child artist in this film. It is likely an unofficial adaptation of The Parent Trap (1961 film).

== Cast ==
- Krishna as Chakravarthy
- Vijayashanti as Sasirekha
- Mahesh Babu as Vinod & Pramod (dual role)
- Mohan Babu as Chakardhar
- Gummadi as Pattabhi Rama Rao
- Prabhakar Reddy as Gopala Krishnaiah Master
- Giri Babu as Kondaiah
- Pradeep Shakti as David
- Thyagaraju as Srikakuleswara Rao
- Sarathi as Changaiah
- Aswini as Geetha
- Sathyapriya as Parvathi
- Jayamalini as Parimalam
- Kuyili as item number
- Master Satish

== Soundtrack ==
Koduku Diddina Kapuram

Film score by Raj–Koti
- Released: 1989
- Genre: Soundtrack
- Length: 28:09
- Label: LEO Audio
- Producer: Raj–Koti

Raj–Koti chronology
Two Town Rowdy (1989)	Koduku Diddina Kapuram (1989)	Anna Thammudu (1990)

Music composed by Raj–Koti. Lyrics were written by Veturi. Music released on LEO Audio Company.

S. No.	Song title	Singers	length
1	"Om Nama Natarajuke"	Chitra	5:00
2	"Jhaam Chaka Chaka"	S. P. Balasubrahmanyam, P. Susheela	4:14
3	"Bahu Paraak O Maharani"	Mano, P. Susheela	4:21
4	"Hey Maama"	S. Janaki	5:28
5	"Aalu Ledhu"	Mano	4:32
6	"Siva Siva"	S. Janaki	4:34
