= Khaleja =

2010 Telugu film by Trivikram Srinivas

- Theatrical release poster
- Directed by: Trivikram Srinivas
- Written by: Trivikram Srinivas
- Produced by: Singanamala Ramesh Babu; C. Kalyan; S. Satya Rama Murthy
- Starring: Mahesh Babu; Anushka Shetty; Prakash Raj
- Cinematography: Yash Bhatt; Sunil Patel
- Edited by: A. Sreekar Prasad
- Music by: Mani Sharma
- Production company: Kanakaratna Movies
- Distributed by: Geetha Arts
- Release date: 7 October 2010
- Running time: 164 minutes
- Country: India
- Language: Telugu
- Budget: ₹38 crore
- Box office: ₹18.08 crores distributors' share

Khaleja (Note: Also known as Mahesh Khaleja) (transl. Courage) is a 2010 Indian Telugu-language fantasy action comedy film written and directed by Trivikram Srinivas. It stars Mahesh Babu and Anushka Shetty, alongside Prakash Raj, Rao Ramesh, Shafi, Sunil, Ali, and Subbaraju in supporting roles. The music was composed by Mani Sharma. The film follows Raju, a taxi driver who is unexpectedly hailed as the prophesied divine saviour of a village suffering from a mysterious disease and must come to terms with his newfound status to protect the villagers.

The film marks Mahesh Babu's return to cinema after a three-year hiatus and his second collaboration with Trivikram after Athadu (2005). Released on 7 October 2010, Khaleja received mixed reviews and was a box office failure. However, it won two Filmfare Awards South for Best Male Playback Singer and Best Lyricist.

Over time, the film was critically re-evaluated and gained a cult following. It is now considered to be one of the best films in Mahesh Babu’s filmography. It was also included in Film Companion's list of the "25 Greatest Telugu Films of the Decade."

== Plot ==
A remote village in Pali is struck by an unknown plague, prompting the village head to prophesy a saviour and dispatch his assistant, Siddha, to find him. Meanwhile, in Hyderabad, cab driver Raju witnesses two of his passengers violently being murdered, leaving his taxi heavily damaged. Raju travels to Rajasthan to deliver insurance money to a victim's family and collect a part of it for repairs on the behest of his supervisor. En route, he rescues Subhashini "Subbu", an acquaintance who ran away from a trip with her ill-intentioned fiancé, and befriends Babji, a journalist who joins him on the trip, and Tom Cruise, a doctor who gives them a lift.

Commiserating with the victim's family, Raju refuses to take money from them and sets out to return home with Subbu. However, at the bus stop, Raju is ambushed and critically wounded by goons working for GK, a powerful industrialist and father of Subbu's fiancé. Fending off the goons led by GK's enforcer Govardhan, he arrives to Siddha, who finds the injured Raju under conditions matching the prophecy, saves his life, and brings him to Pali.

Upon recovering, Raju is shocked upon learning that the villagers worship him as a divine saviour, though he initially rejects the title and flees to Hyderabad with Subbu. When Siddha reaches his doorstep, Raju accepts to help him after a few mind-opening incidents. By kidnapping the medical doctor of a college and it's dean who organised a medical camp in Pali, Raju learns that GK coerced them into getting away with the medical camp. With their information, he abducts Govardhan, and learns about a factory polluting the water resources in Pali. By accidentally confronting the assistant of geologist Paranji, Raju uncovers GK's conspiracy. GK discovered that Pali is rich in Iridium deposits through Paranji, as he funded his project. When GK told him to withhold this from the government, Paranji defied him, so he had him and a villager named Dilawar Singh (who assisted Paranji in finding the source of Iridium) killed. The insurance money was a ruse to kill Raju, since he witnessed their murders (as Paranji and Dilawar Singh were his passengers). To illegally mine the land, GK deliberately poisoned Pali's water supply to drive out the residents, cut off their medical aid, and arranged his son's marriage to Subbu to secure her father's sugarcane farms for Iridium packaging.

Upon learning that Raju uncovered the truth, GK executes Govardhan and Paranji's assistant and orders a total massacre of the village. GK confronts the village head, who steadfastly prophesies that GK will die by Raju and that the village's population will remain at exactly 534. When Raju arrives, GK murders Siddha to mock the prophecy, enraging Raju, who amputates GK's hand. In the ensuing battle, Raju decimates GK's forces and pursues GK, taunting him brutally. When he wishes to have GK killed, a knife tied previously by the village head on a tree falls and stabs GK in the neck, killing him and ending the village's calamity. As Raju watches in disbelief, the village head brings a newborn baby delivered at the exact moment of Siddha's death, stabilizing the population at 534 and fulfilling the prophecy.

== Cast ==
- Mahesh Babu as Alluri Seetharama Raju
- Anushka Shetty as Subhashini (Subbu) (voice dubbed by Sowmya Sharma)
- Prakash Raj as GK
- Sunil as Babji
- Brahmanandam as Lawyer Miriyam
- Ali as Tom Cruise
- Amit Tiwari as GK's son
- Supriya Karnik as GK's wife
- Archana as GK's assistant and a scientist
- Shafi as Siddha, Tantrik's assistant
- Subbaraju as Govardhan
- Kota Srinivasa Rao as Raju's grandfather
- Tanikella Bharani as Durga Prasad, Subhashini's father
- Rao Ramesh as Tantrik, village head
- Raghu Babu as Dr. Sundaram
- Aman Dhaliwal as John
- Ananth Babu as Ananth
- Dharmavarapu Subramanyam as Taxi owner
- Gundu Sudarshan
- Sriranjani as Subbu's mother
- Baby Annie as village girl
- Micky Makhija as Dr. Paranji
- Chaitanya as Village girl's father

== Music ==
The soundtrack was composed by Mani Sharma. The music was released on 27 September 2010. The starcast of the film, including Mahesh Babu, actress Anushka, music director Mani Sharma and director Trivikram Srinivas released the audio at Radio Mirchi FM radio station in the Hyderabad. Mahesh Babu's wife Namrata Shirodkar was also present. The album contains six songs and the lyrics are written by Ramajogayya Sastry and Sirivennela Sitaramasastri.

Khaleja

Soundtrack album by Mani Sharma
- Released: 27 September 2010
- Recorded: 2010
- Genre: Soundtrack
- Length: 29:16
- Label: Sony Music
- Producer: Mani Sharma

Mani Sharma chronology
Kalyanram Kathi (2010)	Khaleja (2010)	Vastadu Naa Raju (2010)

No.	Title	Lyrics	Singer(s)	Length
1.	"Sada Siva"	Ramajogayya Sastry	Ramesh Vinayagam, Karunya, Hema chandra	4:57
2.	"Bhoom Shakana"	Ramajogayya Sastry	Ranjith, Sravana Bhargavi	4:26
3.	"Piliche"	Sirivennela Sitaramasastri	Vedala Hemachandra, Shweta Mohan	4:27
4.	"Makathika"	Ramajogayya Sastry	Karthik, Saindhavi	3:55
5.	"Sunday Monday"	Ramajogayya Sastry	Vedala Hemachandra, Malavika	4:21
6.	"Taxi"	Ramajogayya Sastry	Ranjith	4:49
Total length:				29:16

== Reception ==
=== Critical reception ===
Sify rated 3 out of 5 explained, "No doubt, Mahesh is the cynosure of the movie, shouldering the entire responsibility." MSN rated 3 out of 5 and described the film as "just an above average venture", commenting, "Mahesh Khaleja is worth a watch for Mahesh's strong screen presence and charisma. Mahesh carries off his role with elan and looks superb too. Anushka looks pretty but doesn't share a good on-screen chemistry with Mahesh. The first half of the film is dull. It does pick up pace in the second half but the narration is inconsistent and tedious. The climax is little better. Rediff gave a 3 out of 5 rating and noted, "The duo of Mahesh-Trivikram delivers a product that is watchable, entertaining with good humour, couple of well-orchestrated action sequences and songs and with a bit to take home as well. It's Mahesh's show all the way, much to the delight of his fans. Mahesh is the soul of the movie, be it his dialogue delivery, his action, his dances or emotions, he is effortless.

CNN-IBN gave a mixed review stating, "The movie is all about Mahesh Babu and he occupies almost every frame in the movie. Back after a gap of 3 years, Mahesh looks great with stylish costumes. The movie deals with a serious theme but director Trivikram Srinivas mixes it with a lot of unnecessary situational comedy which dilutes the intensity of the movie."

=== Box office ===
Khaleja collected an distributor's share of approximately ₹4.18 crore on its opening day in Andhra Pradesh and a share of around ₹8.75 crore by the end of its extended opening weekend. The film suffered big drops after its weekend and ended its opening week with a total distributor's share of a mere ₹11.2 crore in Andhra Pradesh. Competition from Brindavanam, and Robo, the Telugu dubbed version of Enthiran, further added to its decay at the box office. By the end of its theatrical run, Khaleja yielded a distributor's share of approximately ₹18.08 crore and was declared as a commercial disappointment, due to its higher budget, as well as because of the expectations surrounding the film prior to its release. Many have since attributed its failure to reasons such as extreme hype leading up to its release as well as a misleading marketing campaign, with general audience expecting a "mass entertainer" instead of a comedy with a devotional angle.

== Awards ==
Filmfare Awards South

Won

- Best Lyricist – Telugu: Ramajogayya Sastry – "Sada Siva"
- Best Male Playback Singer – Telugu: Ramesh Vinayagam & N. C. Karunya – "Sada Siva"

Nominated

- Best Supporting Actor – Telugu – Shafi

== Release ==
Khaleja was released on 7 October 2010.

Home media

Khaleja is available on Sun NXT and Amazon Prime Video.

== Re-release ==
Khaleja was re-released in theaters on 30 May 2025, coinciding with the birthday celebrations of Babu's father, legendary actor Krishna, whose birth anniversary falls on 31 May. Due to overwhelming demand from fans, the film achieved a unique milestone by hosting premiere shows on 29 May 2025, marking the first time a re-release film in Telugu cinema had such an event. The film grossed an impressive ₹13 crore at the box office during this special re-release.
