= Rajakumarudu =

- Poster
- Directed by: K. Raghavendra Rao
- Written by: Paruchuri Brothers (Dialogues)
- Screenplay by: Satyanand
- Produced by: C. Aswani Dutt
- Starring: Mahesh Babu; Preity Zinta
- Cinematography: Ajayan Vincent
- Edited by: Kotagiri Venkateswara Rao
- Music by: Mani Sharma
- Production company: Vyjayanthi Movies
- Release date: 30 July 1999
- Running time: 162 minutes
- Country: India
- Language: Telugu

Rajakumarudu (translated in promotional material as The Prince) is a 1999 Indian Telugu-language romantic comedy film directed by K. Raghavendra Rao. It stars Mahesh Babu in his debut and Preity Zinta. The film was produced by C. Aswani Dutt under the Vyjayanthi Movies banner. Krishna made a guest appearance. The music was composed by Mani Sharma. The film was released on 30 July 1999.

Rajakumarudu was the debut film for Babu in a lead role after previous roles as a child actor. The film received positive reviews and was commercially successful. It won two Nandi Awards.

== Plot ==
Raj Kumar goes on a holiday to Khandala and stays with his uncle Dhananjay. He comes across Rani and falls for her. However, he ends up teasing her, and she begins to despise him. She is determined to avoid him, but he won't leave her alone. Spotting him in a cowboy costume and taking his pics, she starts to like his imaginary counterpart, not knowing who he is. But Raj Kumar destroys her camera negatives after learning she took his photos, disappointing her. The next time, when Rani takes his photo and gets a scarf from him, but fails to find him at last, she gets sad, albeit falling into the hands of some thugs. Raj Kumar saves Rani from those thugs, although she is disappointed again because her camera is broken. Raj Kumar, who later dons cowboy apparel, saves Rani from a rapist, and she learns about his reality after she looks at his face. They spend some time together; she begins to like him and eventually loves him.

Unfortunately, his uncle has made other plans for him. He reveals the past of the hero's parents and his family. He mentions the challenge that he made with his in-laws to get the hero married to his daughter. Complying with this, Raj Kumar informs Rani that their relationship needs to end.

When he reaches his uncle's village, he is overjoyed to see that his daughter is none other than Rani.

The rest of the movie revolves around the plot that is woven by him and his uncle to gain the heroine's hand and reunite the uncle with his family.

== Cast ==
- Mahesh Babu as Raja (credited as Mahesh)
- Preity Zinta as Rani
- Prakash Raj as Dhanunjay
- Sumalatha as Rajyalakshmi
- Srihari as Narsimharayudu
- Prasad Babu as Rajyalakshmi's brother
- Sivaji Raja as Rajyalakshmi's brother
- Brahmanandam as Hyderabad Police Sub-Inspector Wagle
- Asrani as Mumbai Police Inspector
- M. S. Narayana as Police Constable
- AVS as Rajyalakshmi's brother
- Jaya Prakash Reddy as Sarvarayudu
- Raghunatha Reddy as Rajyalakshmi's brother
- Gundu Hanumantha Rao as Coconut seller
- Ananth as Bystander during stick fight
- Venu Madhav as Raja's collegemate
- Shanoor Sana as Rajyalakshmi's sister-in-law
- Rajitha as Rajyalakshmi's sister-in-law
- Sajja Teja as Vengalla Rayudu
- Kaushal Manda as Raja's collegemate
- Khayyum as Raja's collegemate
- Krishna as Krishnamurthy (guest appearance; uncredited)
- Shailaja Priya as Rani's friend
- Jeetu Verma as a rapist
- Delhi Rajeshwari as Sarvarayudu's wife

== Soundtrack ==
Rajakumarudu

Soundtrack album by Mani Sharma
- Released: 1999
- Recorded: 1999
- Genre: Soundtrack
- Length: 30:33
- Labels: Supreme Music (Telugu); Aditya Music (Telugu); Saregama (Hindi)
- Producer: Mani Sharma

Mani Sharma chronology
| Iddaru Mitrulu (1999) | Rajakumarudu (1999) | Seenu (1999) |

Music was composed by Mani Sharma.

Original Tracklist (Telugu)
| No. | Title | Lyrics | Singer(s) | Length |
|---|---|---|---|---|
| 1. | "Godari Gattupaina" | Chandrabose | Udit Narayan, Kavita Krishnamurthy | 5:05 |
| 2. | "Enduke Praayamu" | Veturi | S. P. Balasubrahmanyam, Chitra | 5:07 |
| 3. | "Rama Sakkanodamma" | Suddala Ashok Teja | Sukhwinder Singh, Chitra | 5:41 |
| 4. | "Indurudo Chandurudo" | Veturi | S. P. Balasubrahmanyam, Chitra | 4:34 |
| 5. | "Eppudeppudu" | Veturi | S. P. Balasubrahmanyam, Sujatha | 4:50 |
| 6. | "Bollywood Balaraju" | Veturi | Shankar Mahadevan | 5:15 |
| Total length: | | | | 30:33 |

All lyrics are written by Ravinder Rawal and Dev Kohli.

Hindi Tracklist (Prince No. 1)
| No. | Title | Singer(s) | Length |
|---|---|---|---|
| 1. | "Ganga Ke Ek Kinare" | Udit Narayan, Kavita Krishnamurthy | 5:05 |
| 2. | "Sharmane Lagi" | Kumar Sanu, Anuradha Paudwal | 5:07 |
| 3. | "Munda Pataka" | Sukhwinder Singh, Jaspinder Narula | 5:41 |
| 4. | "Ab Tu Meri" | Vinod Rathod, Krishna Kumar, Poornima | 4:34 |
| 5. | "Pyar Kar Shuru" | Sonu Nigam, Sunidhi Chauhan | 4:50 |
| 6. | "Aashiq Hai Naam Dosto" | Sonu Nigam | 5:15 |
| Total length: | | | 30:33 |

Tamil Tracklist
| No. | Title | Length |
|---|---|---|
| 1. | "Karkandu Kannam" | 5:05 |
| 2. | "Nenjile Poo Poothathu" | 5:07 |
| 3. | "Rammanoda" | 5:41 |
| 4. | "Anthiriyil" | 4:34 |
| 5. | "Yeppa Ippadi" | 4:50 |
| 6. | "Pattukul" | 5:15 |
| Total length: | | 30:33 |

== Release and reception ==
Rajakumarudu released with 78 prints in 116 screens. Jeevi of Idlebrain.com wrote that "There are some excellent scenes in the second half that will make us realize how good is Mahesh at comedy. He is got perfect timing. He will the force to reckon with in the future". Griddaluru Gopalrao of Zamin Ryot wrote that "All old stuff. There is not a single interesting new thing thing so it turns out to be an ordinary film" and added that "the dialogues of Paruchuri brothers were hilarious".

== Box-office ==
The film had a 50-day run in 80 centres and a 100-day run in 44 centres. It was dubbed in Hindi as Prince No. 1 and in Tamil as Kaadhal Vennila. The film was again dubbed and released theatrically in Tamil during January 2017 as Ivan Oru Thunichalkaran.

== Awards ==
Nandi Awards

- Best Home - Viewing Feature film in 1999.
- Best Art Director - Srinivasa Raju
