= Takkari Donga =

- Poster
- Directed by: Jayanth C. Paranjee
- Screenplay by: Jayanth C. Paranjee
- Story by: Satyanand
- Dialogues by: Satyanand
- Produced by: Jayanth C. Paranjee
- Starring: Mahesh Babu; Lisa Ray; Bipasha Basu
- Cinematography: Jayanan Vincent
- Edited by: Marthand K. Venkatesh
- Music by: Mani Sharma
- Production company: Jayanth Fulcrum Cinergies
- Release date: 12 January 2002
- Running time: 146 minutes
- Country: India
- Language: Telugu

Takkari Donga (transl. The sly thief) is a 2002 Indian Telugu-language Western film directed and produced by Jayanth C. Paranjee. The film stars Mahesh Babu, Lisa Ray, Bipasha Basu, and Rahul Dev in pivotal roles. The film follows a fearless outlaw who offers to safeguard the daughter of his accomplice in return for a map to a secret diamond mine. However, his quest is compromised after a bandit gets wind of the secret map.

The film was mostly shot in the United States. Upon release, Takkari Donga received mixed reviews and was a box-office bomb. It won five state Nandi Awards including Best Audiographer, Best Cinematographer, and Best Fight Master.

== Plot ==
The film starts with the slain bandit Shaka killing his own elder brother for information related to diamond valley, who is also known to rancher Veeru Dada. In the encounter, Veeru jumps off into a river from a cliff. After 18 years in Gajner, Rajasthan, we have Veeru with an amputated leg, giving info to Raja, a mischievous, and tough outlaw who loots banks in style. Raja gives Veeru a share of 50% for all his tip-offs. Raja becomes more daring as the price tag on his head increases by thousands. There is another mischievous thief, Panasa. She and her uncle follow Raja so she can dupe him and escape with all the looted money. As things go on a frolicking way between Panasa and Raja, Shaka is searching for Veeru. Veeru realizes Shaka will kill him soon.

Hence, Veeru offers a large diamond to Raja and asks him to take his daughter Bhuvana to his brother Dharma's place via a dangerous route. Enroute, there are some romantic encounters, and they fall in love. Raja sees a house that emotionally disturbs him. When Bhuvana asks about it he reveals that it is his childhood house and his father and sister were killed by an unknown masked person and he became a thief on the journey of finding him. When Bhuvana asks how will he identify the killer, he tells her there is a scar on the killer's hand by which he can identify him.

Later, when they go to Dharma's place, Dharma is killed. Raja goes to a nearby shop to arrange a funeral for Dharma. But it is Shaka who is disguised as the shop owner. When Shaka arrives he sees a map in Bhuvana's hand. He forcibly tries to take it and in excitement he said that for that map he killed his brother, Bhuvana's father, Dharma and that map is the way to diamond valley. Meanwhile, a fight ensues in which the map is burnt. Then Shaka ties Raja to a tree and forcibly takes Bhuvana as only she knows the route to that hidden diamond treasury.

Meanwhile, Raja releases himself and went to Shaka. A fight takes place. Later, Shaka reveals he knows who killed Raja's father and he will give details about him only when Raja helps him cross the dangerous terrain to reach diamond valley with hidden treasure. Raja agrees. With the help of Raja, Shaka finds the path to the hidden treasure. While Shaka is taking the diamonds, Raja notices the scar on Shaka's hand by which he realizes it is Shaka who killed his father and sister. Raja kills Shaka and reunites with Bhuvana.

== Cast ==
- Mahesh Babu as Raja
- Lisa Ray as Bhuvana
- Bipasha Basu as Panasa
- Kolla Ashok Kumar as Veeru Dada
- Rahul Dev as Shaka
- Tanikella Bharani as Doobey (Panasa's uncle)
- Surya
- Ravi Chalapati
- Rajasimha as Bartender
- Krishna (special appearance)

== Production ==
The film was launched on 8 October 2000 at Ramanaidu Studios. Principal photography began on 3 January 2001. Major portions were filmed in the Colorado Plateau region of the United States, including Monument Valley and Arches National Park. The climax fight sequence was shot in Chalakudy, Kerala.

The film was initially titled Magadheera (Someone Special), with Veera (The Warrior) also considered. Before finalising the title, the website Idlebrain.com held a contest inviting suggestions for the film’s title. However, director Jayant C. Paranji was not satisfied with the suggestions. The film's title was revealed to be Takkari Donga inspired from Krishna starrer Takkari Donga Chakkani Chukka.

== Music ==
The soundtrack was composed by Mani Sharma and the lyrics were written by Bhuvana Chandra, Vennelakanti, Chandra Bose and Kula Sekhar.

- Theme - Instrumental
- "Nalugurikee" - Shankar Mahadevan, Lyrics by Chandrabose
- "Aleba Aleba" - K. K, Kalpana, Lyrics by Bhuvana Chandra
- "Hey Mama" - Tippu, Kalpana, Lyrics by Vennalakanti
- "Bagundammo" - SPB Charan, Usha, Lyrics by Kula Sekhar
- "Chukkallu Chandhrudee" - S. P. Balasubrahmanyam, Prasanna, Lyrics by Bhuvana Chandra

== Reception ==
A critic from Deccan Chronicle wrote, "A smooth, technically brilliant movie after a considerable time in Telugu, Takkari Donga is entertaining and, in spite of its stereotypical pitfalls, is certainly a refreshing break from the deluge of routine love stories". A critic from The Hindu said, "Though it is not new for the Telugu film makers to make cowboy films, this film scores in technical quality, with cinematographer Jayanan Vincent leading in his department. The visual is set against a kind of dusty hue throughout its run, reflecting the wild West". A critic from The Times of India stated, "If you don't mind half a dozen songs slackening the pace of the film Takkari Donga is a complete entertainer".

Jeevi of Idlebrain.com wrote, "Takkari Donga is a sweet and sensible film". Andhra Today wrote, "Jayanth as producer and director takes the audience through a thrilling journey as in the great westerns. His impressive style, choice of locations, setting and action sequences will amaze the Tollywood audience. The meticulousness and dexterity of both the director and the cameraman are evident in almost every frame of the movie. While the variety is interesting and will mesmerize the audience temporarily the movie suffers from a very weak storyline and may not hold the audience in a spell".

== Dubbed versions ==
The film was dubbed and released in Hindi as Choron Ka Chor by Goldmines Telefilms and in Tamil as Vetri Veeran.

== Awards ==
Nandi Awards

- Best Audiographer - P. Madhusudhan Reddy
- Special Jury Award - Mahesh Babu
- Best Fight Master - Vijayan
- Best Cinematographer - Jayanan Vincent
- Best Child Actor - Koushik Babu
