= Businessman (film) =

2012 film directed by Puri Jagannadh

- Theatrical release poster
- Directed by: Puri Jagannadh
- Written by: Puri Jagannadh; Concept by: Ram Gopal Varma
- Produced by: R. R. Venkat
- Starring: Mahesh Babu; Kajal Aggarwal; Prakash Raj
- Cinematography: Shyam K. Naidu
- Edited by: M. S. Rajashekhar Reddy (S. R. Shekhar)
- Music by: S. Thaman
- Production company: R. R. Makers
- Release date: 13 January 2012
- Running time: 131 minutes
- Country: India
- Language: Telugu
- Budget: ₹40 crore
- Box office: est.₹72 crore

Businessman is a 2012 Indian Telugu-language action crime film directed and written by Puri Jagannadh and produced by R. R. Venkat under the banner R. R. Movie Makers. It is based from a concept by Ram Gopal Varma and stars an ensemble cast featuring Mahesh Babu, Kajal Aggarwal, Prakash Raj, Nassar, Sayaji Shinde, Raza Murad, Subbaraju and Brahmaji. In the film, Vijay Surya arrives at Mumbai with aspirations to rule the city due to his grudge against the corrupt system in the country, but begins to face violent challenges from the cops and his enemies.

S. Thaman composed the music, while Shyam K. Naidu and M. S. Rajashekhar Reddy (S. R. Shekhar) handled the cinematography and editing. The film was made with a budget of ₹40 crore and was launched formally on 15 August 2011 in Hyderabad. Principal photography began on 2 September 2011 and was shot in Hyderabad, Mumbai and Goa. A few song sequences were shot in Bangkok. Filming ended on 10 December 2011 in 74 working days, making as one of the shortest periods in which a Telugu film has been shot.

Businessman was released during Sankranthi on 14 January 2012. The film grossed over ₹72 crore in its original release, becoming one of the highest-grossing Telugu films of 2012.

== Plot ==
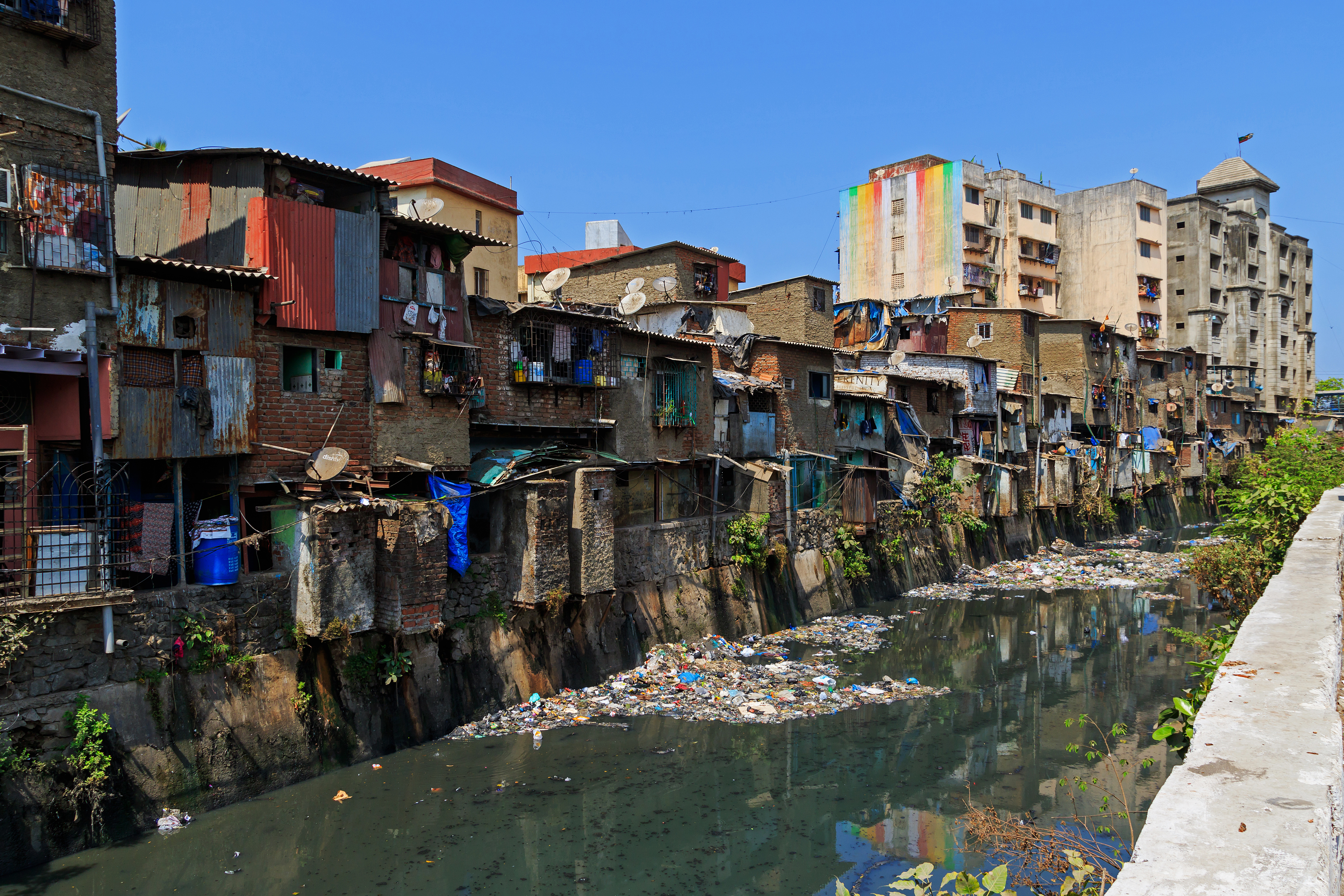
The Dharavi slum in Mumbai

When Mumbai Police Commissioner Ajay Bhardwaj has declared the end of the mafia in the city, a brutal man named Vijay Surya arrives with the intention of conquering Mumbai. Staying at Dharavi with his friend, Surya recruits a group of gangsters and wins the support of a local politician named Lalu after getting a witness killed in jail by his henchman Shakeel. Surya further helps the Dharavi locals clear their debts by making his henchmen rob the original copies of the loan documents kept at the local branch of Bank of Maharashtra and destroy the bank records. While the locals hail him as their savior, Surya becomes feared for extortion.

In order to safeguard himself from Ajay, Surya traps his daughter Chitra Bhardwaj and pretends to fall for her. At the same time, Lalu requests Surya to make him the next mayor of Mumbai by threatening his opponent Arun Gokhale, who is endorsed by central minister and PM aspirant Ghanapuleti Jaidev. After being narrowly killed by Surya's men, Gokhale seeks Jaidev's help, and he sends his assassins; Surya, having been tipped by his right-hand Nazir, tricks the assassins into believing that he is a guide sent to help them where he plants bombs in their food that explodes, resulting in a shootout. While escaping, Surya sees Chitra, who has now learned of his true nature. When arrested, Surya accepts that he trapped her, but now he truly loves her. However, Ajay is forced to free Surya after his henchmen kidnap Chitra. Surya promises to give up crime in order to live with Chitra, but his proposal is turned down. So, he decides to legalize the mafia which cannot be touched by the police.

Surya started a company named Surya Exports & Imports as a front for his vigilante acts. In order to set up branch offices all over the country, Surya recruits local gangsters for staff and begins to forcibly extract a 2% tax on every contract made in the respective areas. Eventually, Surya becomes a billionaire, and during the inauguration of his "Business Bank", reveals his thirst for power to Ajay, further citing the decline in crime rate after recruiting the gangsters, and expressing his desire to help the needy. Surya further helps Lalu become the mayor of Mumbai by orchestrating fake IT raids on the properties of Jaidev and his accomplices, resulting in Gokhale's defeat; Surya later kidnaps Gokhale and returns him to Ajay, thereby exposing Jaidev's scams. Surya meets LoP Guru Govind Patel through Lalu and offers him ₹35,000 crore for election campaigning along with the promise to make him the next PM of India.Learning that Jaidev is planning to get Gokhale, Chitra and Ajay killed, Surya saves Chitra but fails to save Ajay, who tells him to kill Jaidev in his final moments, and Gokhale, who is poisoned to death. Surya then reveals to Chitra his past.

Past: Surya was an American-born Indian whose philanthropist parents were cheated and killed by Jaidev. As a child, Surya tried to enlist the help of the police but found none, and he ended up stabbing and shooting Jaidev publicly; at jail, he decided to reform the corrupt system and control India.

Present: At the election, Surya spends crores of rupees per constituency in the nation, with Lalu installing candidates at his behest; Surya also exposes Jaidev's illegal affair, making him unable to contest in the elections. Enraged, Jaidev kidnaps Chitra and Surya arrives to rescue her. Jaidev thrashes him and reveals that he gained public sympathy due to Surya's attack as a child and managed to become an MP. However, Surya gets into a fight with Jaidev's henchmen and leaves them all dead, except one who holds Chitra at knifepoint. Jaidev agrees to free Chitra if Surya dies. Surya shoots himself before shooting both Jaidev and the henchman to death. Chitra accepts her love for Surya, and Guru Govind Patel wins the elections. While recovering in the hospital, Surya delivers a message to the public, telling them not to trust anyone and that God has thrown them into a warzone, and tells the people to pursue anything according to their interest.

== Cast ==
- Mahesh Babu as Vijay Surya a.k.a. "Surya Bhai"
  - Akash Puri as Young Surya
- Kajal Aggarwal as Chitra Bhardwaj
- Prakash Raj as Jaidev Ghanapuleti
- Nassar as Ajay Bhardwaj IPS (Commissioner), Chitra's father
- Sayaji Shinde as Laalu Saab
- Raza Murad as Guru Govind Patel
- Subbaraju as Jaidev's assistant
- Brahmaji as Bujji, Surya's friend
- Dharmavarapu Subramanyam as Laalu's secretary
- Bharath Reddy as Inspector Bharath
- Sanjay Swaroop as Surya's father
- Ayesha Shiva as Ayesha, Chitra's friend
- Mahesh Balraj as Nazeer
- Rajeev Mehta as Arun Ghokle
- Bandla Ganesh as Puliraju
- Shweta Bhardwaj in the item number "Bad Boys"
- Puri Jagannadh as a taxi driver (cameo)
- Japan Kumar (special appearance in the song "Pilla Ciao")

== Production ==
=== Development ===
Ram Gopal Varma signed Suriya for a multilingual action film titled The Businessman in May 2010, to be directed by Puri Jagannadh simultaneously in Telugu, Tamil and Hindi. The film's protagonist was supposed to be a South Indian coming to Mumbai and setting up a crime business using tact and intelligence to emerge as one of the biggest gangsters. The film's production was expected to begin in October 2010 once Suriya completed his part in 7 Aum Arivu (2011) and was scheduled for release in the summer of 2011.

The film was revived later by R. R. Venkat later in January 2011 with a tagline "Guns do not need agreements". He signed Mahesh Babu as the protagonist who worked with Jagannadh in the past for Pokiri (2006). Jagannadh completed the final draft of the film's script on 25 July 2011 during his stay at Bangkok, adding that he was inspired by Ram Gopal Varma. He stated that the pending pre-production work would begin in Hyderabad after a week. The film had its formal launch on 15 August 2011 with a small pooja ceremony conducted at Hyderabad. Shyam K. Naidu and S. Thaman were confirmed as the film's cinematographer and music director respectively.

=== Casting ===
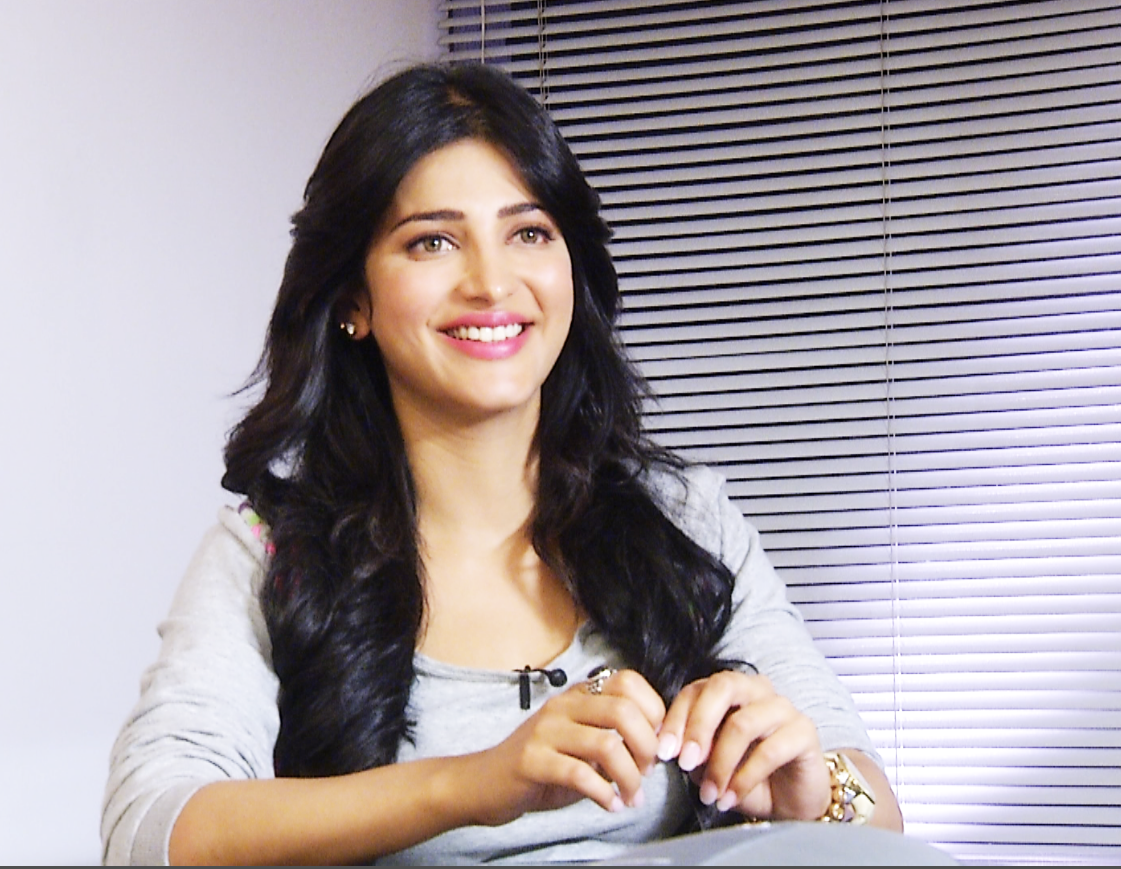
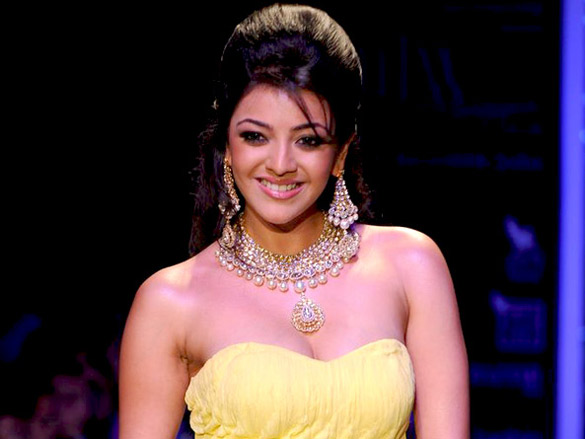
Shruti Haasan (top) was initially considered for the female lead role, but Kajal Aggarwal (bottom) ended up being engaged for the role.

Babu received the film's script while dubbing for Dookudu (2011), but due to that commitment, it took 10 days to finish reading the script. He said in an interview that he could maintain the consistency in the character only because of the fewer working days. Jagannadh did not cast Brahmanandam and Ali because of Babu's specific characterisation; he added that Babu's voice had changed when compared to his performance in Pokiri. Babu also convinced Jagannadh to give up smoking, since he himself was trying to give up after being a chain smoker.

Shruti Haasan was initially considered for the female lead role after her performance in her Telugu film debut, Anaganaga O Dheerudu (2011). However, Kajal Aggarwal was signed as the female lead later in May 2011, marking her first collaboration with both Babu and Jagannadh respectively. She was paid ₹1 crore for this film. Jagannadh confirmed reports stating Babu and Aggarwal sharing a kiss in the film, adding that he retained them after Babu's wife Namrata Shirodkar approved it. It was reportedly the first onscreen kiss for Babu. Aggarwal explained that it was not supposed to be sensual, but was meant to portray the conflict between two characters, and added that it was shot "aesthetically" by Jagannadh.

Actress Shweta Bhardwaj was friends with Jagannadh, and he approached her for this song during the film's shoot at Mumbai, saying that the song suited her and her personality as a dancer. She also tried to understand the meaning of the lyrics while dancing. Bhardwaj was afraid of dancing, suspecting a possible sprain, and found the costumes uneasy, but had to continue upon the choreographer's insistence. Canadian-born Indian actress Ayesha Shiva was signed to play Aggarwal's friend in the film.

=== Filming ===
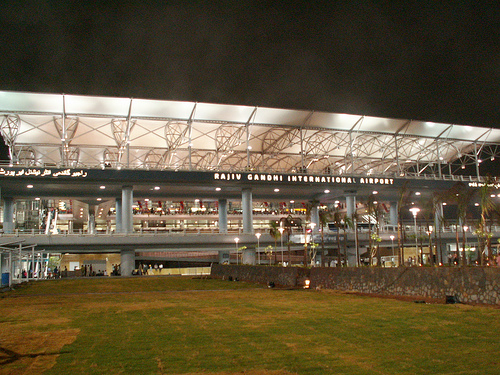
Rajiv Gandhi International Airport, where principal photography began.

Jagannadh told Venkat that he needed 75 working days to complete the film's shoot. He planned to start with Babu in the first week of September 2011 and established this schedule before finishing in the first week of January 2012. Filming began on 2 September 2011 at Rajiv Gandhi International Airport in Hyderabad.

The song "We Want Bad Boys" was shot in late October 2011. After filming two songs in the districts of Krabi and Pattaya in Bangkok, the film's unit returned to Hyderabad on 2 December 2011 for completing patch work. The film's shooting was wrapped up on 10 December 2011 in 74 working days as expected.

=== Post production ===
The film's dubbing activities began on 15 December 2011 at Shabdalaya Studios in Hyderabad. The DTS mixing works were in progress in early January 2012. The Central Board of Film Certification passed the film with an 'A' certificate; board members found few of the film's dialogues offensive and potentially upsetting to the people of Mumbai. Despite being set in Mumbai, the film features dialogue in Telugu, a language that is not native to the city for the convenience of the viewers. A disclaimer at the beginning of the film is given regarding the same.

== Music ==
The soundtrack consists of six songs composed by S. Thaman and written by Bhaskarabhatla Ravi Kumar. Aditya Music acquired the audio rights. The original version of the soundtrack was released on 21 December 2011, along with the dubbed Tamil and Malayalam versions at Shilpakala Vedika in Hyderabad. Na. Muthukumar and Kailas Rishi wrote the lyrics for the dubbed Tamil and Malayalam versions of the songs respectively. The soundtrack sold nearly 200,000 compact discs on the first day of its release itself.

== Marketing ==
The first-look poster featuring a still of Mahesh sitting in a chair and deeply thinking was revealed on 11 November 2011 (11.11.11), receiving a positive response. The theatrical trailer was attached to the prints of Panjaa (2011) to be screened in theatres from 9 December 2011.

As a part of the film's promotion, Aditya Music offered a range of ringtone packs. Contests were introduced where the winners won posters autographed by Babu, the film's tickets, and soundtrack discs apart from others.

== Release ==
=== Theatrical ===
The film was initially planned for a worldwide release on 11 January 2012. Hari Venkateswara Pictures acquired the film's overseas distribution rights and after requests by non-Telugu Babu fans, it was the first Telugu film to release with subtitles in overseas cinemas. The release was postponed by two days to 13 January 2012 due to post production delays. 2,000 screens across the world were booked for the film's initial release.

It was released to 92 screens across Hyderabad, breaking the previous record set by Oosaravelli (2011) which was released to 70 screens. Prasads IMAX screened 33 shows on the release day. The film's Tamil dubbed version, also titled Businessman, was released on 7 December 2012 to 200 screens across Tamil Nadu.

=== Home media ===
Jagannadh acquired the satellite rights of the film during his negotiations with the film's producers for ₹5 crore. He wanted to rotate the film screening on various channels, at appropriate times, in a bid to gain more widespread viewership and recoup his investment. The film's television broadcast rights were later sold to Gemini TV. The film's DVD and Blu-ray discs were produced by Universal Home Entertainment and were released in May 2012.

=== Legal issues and criticism ===
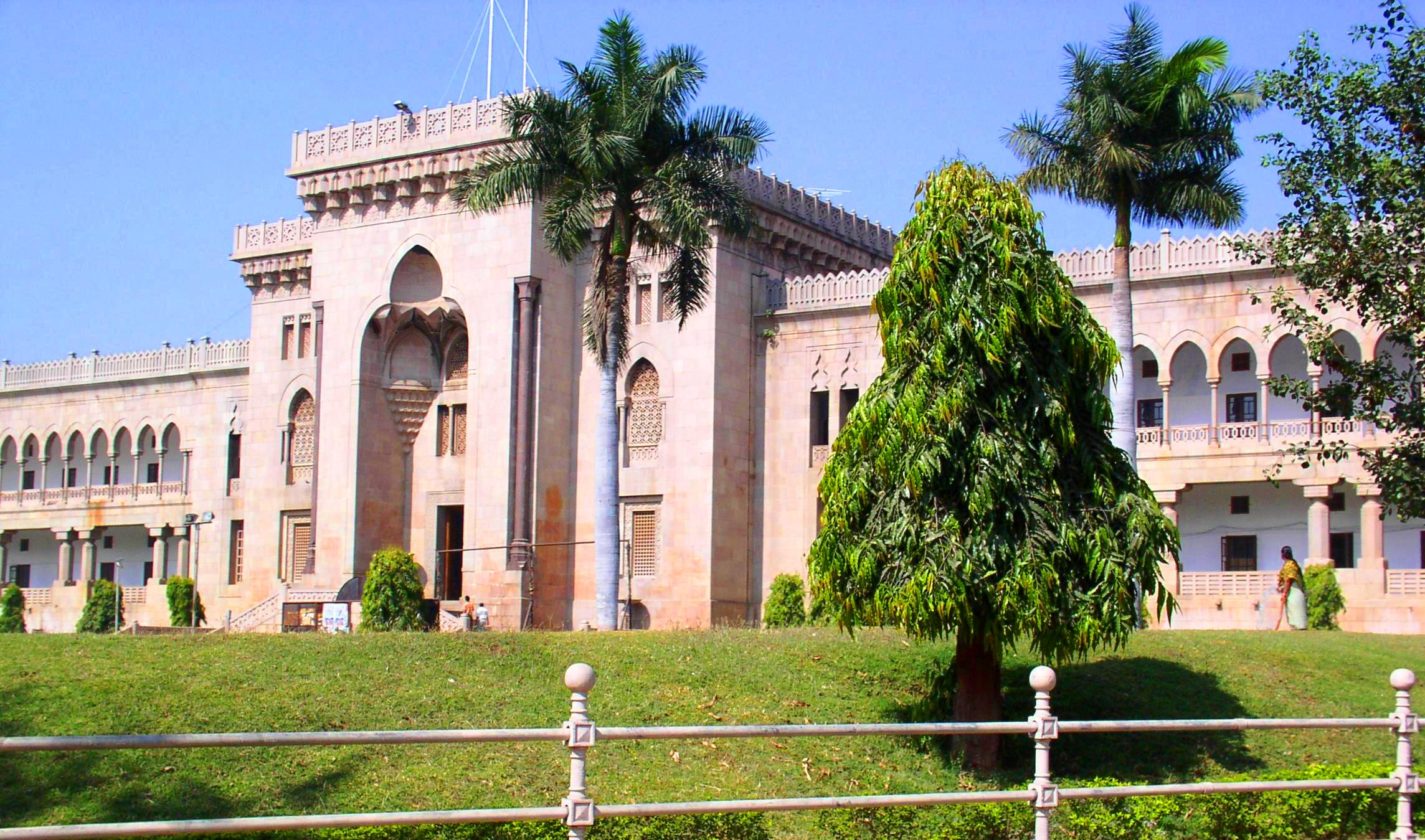
Osmania Arts College, where Akhil Bharatiya Vidyarthi Parishad activists burnt the film's reels on 25 January 2012 in protest of a few of the film's dialogues and the lyrics of the song We want Bad Boys

S. Thaman was criticised for copying the tunes of the Italian partisan song "Bella ciao" for the song "Pilla Chao" and "He Lives in You", a song written and performed by Lebo M and his South African Choir for the album Rhythm of the Pride Lands (1995), for the song "Chandamama". "Pilla Chao" was one of the more successful songs on the soundtrack and many music lovers left angry comments about the plagiarism on the song's YouTube video.

The makers violated the rules of The Cinematograph Act, 1952, and the Central Board of Film Certification regarding the re-working of its title from The Businessman to Businessman after the board cleared the film with the former title. The Andhra Pradesh Film Chamber of Commerce cleared the registration of the film title as The Businessman on 1 January 2011 through a letter and was renewed up to 22 April 2012. The set of posters sent to the board for certification purposes carried the full title. The film was publicised without the definite article, which was also missing from the posters. Also, the 'A' certification was omitted.

After release, the film was criticised for the usage of curse-words by the protagonist and a few intimate sequences between the lead pair. The muting of a few dialogues and blurring of a few visuals by the board were criticised by viewers. Bajrang Dal lodged a complaint with Municipal police on 14 January 2012 stating that the lyrics of the song "We love Bad Boys" contained vulgar words and conveyed an unacceptable meaning for which they demanded action against Jagannadh. The police confirmed this and stated they would seek legal opinions for taking further action.

Akhil Bharatiya Vidyarthi Parishad activists entered the Aradhana Theatre at Tarnaka near Osmania University, and stopped a screening on 25 January 2012 at 11:30 AM. They stole the film's reels and ripped off the film's hoardings and flexies at the theatre, protesting a few dialogues which allegedly demeaned Rama and were anti-patriotic. They burnt the film's reels in front of Osmania Arts College in protest of the lyrics of the song "We want Bad Boys" alleging that the song was filled with abusive words. They also demanded a public apology by Babu and Jagannadh. Journalist Rohit Vats in his article Real and reel: How Telugu cinema celebrates stalking mentioned the sequences in Businessman quoting, "The conversation between Mahesh Babu and Kajal Aggarwal in Businessman was termed vulgar but later it was accepted in the name of sarcasm. Basically, it was perceived as harmless teasing".

== Reception ==
The film grossed over ₹90 crore in its lifetime at the global box office.

=== Re-release ===
Businessman was re-released on August 9, 2023, on the occasion of Mahesh Babu's birthday and was successful.

=== Critical response ===
Suresh Krishnamoorthy of The Hindu called Businessman a "wholesome package" and a "pure entertainer", quoting "Puri Jagannath has proved that he's still the director with the Midas touch with his latest release, Businessman". Y. Sunita Chowdary, also from The Hindu, wrote "The Businessman has a mix of action, image, dialogue and montage but what makes it entertaining is that all the above quantities are inextricably bound and linked together at every level with an admirably tight script." She added that Jagannadh did not make any structural, technical or content errors, although the story was a regular one. Suresh Kavirayani of The Times of India gave the film 3.5 out of 5 stars and called the film an "unpretentious entertainer that manages to strike the right balance", which according to him, had enough in it to keep the viewers interested till the end despite not being a spectacular production.

Indo-Asian News Service (IANS) gave the film 3 out of 5 stars and called Businessman a film for Babu's fans and highlighted Babu's performance and Jagannadh's dialogues as the film's strong points. Another reviewer from IANS called the film "senseless yet entertaining" and stated "Mahesh's dashing performance as a mafia kingpin with a hidden personal agenda is commendable and deserves high appreciation. Businessman may be perverse and appeal only to the masses, yet is a winner for unexplainable reasons." Radhika Rajamani of Rediff.com gave the film 2.5 out of 5 stars and opined that Businessman was an entertaining film if watched uncritically. She added, "There's no doubt that Puri Jagan has played to the gallery and kept the masses and Mahesh's image in mind while conceiving this film. Its just Mahesh all the way."

Sify felt that the film was strictly for Babu's fans but praised Jagannadh's work saying that the "story sounds far fetched, demanding logic. The screenplay is a saving grace, which works like magic, making the audiences forget the monotony in between." The reviewer highlighted Mahesh's performance, the dialogues, and the songs as the film's stronger elements. Ramchander of Oneindia Entertainment called Businessman a serious film with limited appeal, which might be enjoyed by Babu's fans but which would be an average for others. B. V. S. Prakash of Deccan Chronicle gave the film 3 out of 5 stars and stated "Businessman is a typical Mahesh Babu film all the way, evoking laughs with comic one-liners and subtle expressions. However, his efforts could go in vain thanks to a contrived and highly exaggerated plot."

=== Accolades ===
Ceremony	Category	Nominee	Result	Ref(s)
TSR - TV9 National Film Awards 2012	Best Director	Puri Jagannadh	Won	
2nd South Indian International Movie Awards	SIIMA Award for Best Director (Telugu)	Puri Jagannadh	Nominated	
2nd South Indian International Movie Awards	SIIMA Award for Best Cinematographer (Telugu)	Shyam K. Naidu	Nominated	
2nd South Indian International Movie Awards	SIIMA Award for Best Actor (Telugu)	Mahesh Babu	Nominated	
2nd South Indian International Movie Awards	SIIMA Award for Best Actress (Telugu)	Kajal Aggarwal	Nominated	
2nd South Indian International Movie Awards	SIIMA Award for Best Supporting Actor (Telugu)	Nassar	Nominated	
2nd South Indian International Movie Awards	SIIMA Award for Best Music Director (Telugu)	S. Thaman	Nominated	
2nd South Indian International Movie Awards	SIIMA Award for Best Lyricist (Telugu)	Bhaskarabhatla for "Sir Osthara"	Won	
2nd South Indian International Movie Awards	SIIMA Award for Best Male Playback Singer (Telugu)	S. Thaman for "Sir Osthara"	Won	
2nd South Indian International Movie Awards	Best Female Playback Singer	Suchitra for "Sir Osthara"	Nominated	
2nd South Indian International Movie Awards	Best Fight Choreographer	FEFSI Vijayan	Nominated	
60th Filmfare Awards South	Best Film – Telugu	R. R. Venkat	Nominated	
60th Filmfare Awards South	Best Director – Telugu	Puri Jagannadh	Nominated	
60th Filmfare Awards South	Best Actor – Telugu	Mahesh Babu	Nominated	
60th Filmfare Awards South	Best Music Director – Telugu	S. Thaman	Nominated	
60th Filmfare Awards South	Best Playback Female Singer – Telugu	Suchitra for "Sir Osthara"	Won	
Santosham Film Awards 2013	Best Actor	Mahesh Babu	Won	
Santosham Film Awards 2013	Best Lyricist	Bhaskarabhatla	Won	
Santosham Film Awards 2013	Radio City Listeners Choice	Suchitra for "Sir Osthara"	Won	

== Cancelled remake ==
After Babu refused to perform in the Hindi remake of this film, Jagannadh approached Ranbir Kapoor in late January 2012 and arranged a special screening for him.

== Future ==
Jagannadh expressed interest in making a sequel of the film after the response to the original on its first day and planned to begin work on the same from late 2012. Mahesh Babu too confirmed the same in late January 2012 during the scripting stage of the sequel titled Businessman 2. It was planned as a bilingual film to be shot in Telugu and Hindi simultaneously. Ram Gopal Varma also expressed interest after listening to the script and felt that the sequel would do much better business than the original.
