= List of Telugu films of 2022 =

This is a list of Telugu-language films produced in Telugu cinema in India that were released in 2022.

== Box office collection ==
The list of highest-grossing Telugu films released in 2022, by worldwide box office gross revenue, are as follows:

*	Denotes films still running in cinemas worldwide

#	Implies that the film is multilingual and the gross collection figure includes the worldwide collection of the other simultaneously filmed version.

Highest worldwide gross of 2022
Rank	Title	Production company	Worldwide gross	Ref.
1	RRR	DVV Entertainment	₹1,387.26 crore (US$140 million)	
2	Sarkaru Vaari Paata	Mythri Movie Makers; 14 Reels Plus; G. Mahesh Babu Entertainment	₹180−200 crore (US$−21 million)	
3	Radhe Shyam	UV Creations; T-Series Films	₹170−214 crore (US$−22 million)	
4	Bheemla Nayak	Sithara Entertainments	₹160−192.37 crore (US$−20 million)	
5	F3: Fun and Frustration	Sri Venkateswara Creations	₹134 crore (US$14 million)	
6	Karthikeya 2	Abhishek Agarwal Arts; People Media Factory	₹121.50 crore (US$13 million)	
7	Dhamaka	People Media Factory; Abhishek Agarwal Arts	₹110 crore (US$11 million)	
8	Godfather	Konidela Production Company	₹108.7 crore (US$11 million)	
9	Sita Ramam	Vyjayanthi Movies; Swapna Cinema	₹94 crore (US$9.8 million)	(Note: Hindustan Times Telugu reported that the worldwide collection as ₹115 crore. But News 18 and Zee News stated it as ₹91.4 crore. While News 18 Telugu mentioned it as ₹98.1 crore.)
10	Acharya	Konidela Production Company; Matinee Entertainment	₹76 crore (US$7.9 million)	

== January–March ==
Opening		Title	Director	Cast	Production House	Ref.
J A N	1	Aasha Encounter	Anand Chandra	Srikanth Iyengar; Sonia Akula; Praveen Raj	Anuraag Kancharla Productions	
J A N	1	Induvadana	M. Srinivas Raju	Varun Sandesh; Farnaz Shetty; Raghu Babu; Dhanraj; Praveen Raj	Sri Balaji Pictures	
J A N	7	1945 (Note: Simultaneously shot in Tamil language.)	Sathyasiva	Rana Daggubati; Regina Cassandra; Sathyaraj; Nassar	K Productions	
J A N	7	Atithi Devo Bhava	Polimera Nageshawar	Aadi; Nuveksha	Srinivasa Cine Creations	
J A N	14	Bangarraju	Kalyan Krishna	Nagarjuna; Naga Chaitanya; Ramya Krishna; Kriti Shetty	Zee Studios; Annapurna Studios	
J A N	14	Rowdy Boys	Harsha Konuganti	Ashish Reddy; Anupama Parameswaran	Sri Venkateswara Creations; Aditya Music	
J A N	14	Super Machi	Puli Vaasu	Kalyan Dev; Rachita Ram	Rizwan Entertainment	
J A N	14	The American Dream	Dr. Vighnesh Koushik	Prince Cecil; Neha Krishna; Subhalekha Sudhakar		
J A N	15	Hero	Sriram Adittya	Ashok Galla; Nidhhi Agerwal; Jagapathi Babu	Amara Raja Entertainment and Media	
J A N	18	Uniki	Rajkumar Bobby	Chitra Shukla; Ashish Gandhi	Evergreen Entertainments	
J A N	28	Good Luck Sakhi	Nagesh Kukunoor	Keerthy Suresh; Aadhi Pinisetty; Jagapathi Babu; Rahul Ramakrishna	Worth A Shot Motion Arts; Sri Venkateswara Creations	
F E B	11	Khiladi	Ramesh Varma	Ravi Teja; Arjun Sarja; Unni Mukundan; Meenakshi Chaudhary; Dimple Hayathi; Nikitin Dheer	Pen India Limited; A Studios LLP	
F E B	11	Sehari	Gnanasagar Dwaraka	Harsh Kanumilli; Simran Choudhary; Abhinav Gomatam; Praneeth Reddy Kallem; Akshithaa; Sneha Velidindi; Koti	Virgo Pictures	
F E B	11	Bhamakalapam	Abhimanyu	Priyamani; Saranya Pradeep	SVCC Digital	
F E B	11	Malli Modalaindhi	TG Keerthi Kumar	Sumanth; Naina Ganguly; Varshini Sounderajan; Pavani Reddy; Suhasini Maniratnam	ED Entertainments	
F E B	12	DJ Tillu	Vimal Krishna	Siddhu Jonnalagadda; Neha Shetty	Sithara Entertainment	
F E B	18	Son of India	Diamond Ratnababu	Mohan Babu; Srikanth; Tanikella Bharani; Ali; Raghu Babu; Raja Ravindra	Lakshmi Prasanna Pictures; 24 Frames Factory	
F E B	18	Virgin Story	Pradip B. Atluri	Vikram Sahadev; Sowmika Pandiyan; Rishika Khanna	Ramalakshmi Cine Creations	
F E B	25	Bheemla Nayak	Saagar K Chandra	Pawan Kalyan; Rana Daggubati; Nithya Menen; Samyuktha Menon; Samuthirakani; Murali Sharma; Raghu Babu	Sithara Entertainments	
M A R	4	Sebastian PC 524	Balaji Sayyapureddy	Kiran Abbavaram; Komalee Prasad; Nuveksha	Jovitha Cinemas	
M A R	4	Aadavallu Meeku Johaarlu	Tirumala Kishore	Sharwanand; Rashmika Mandanna; Kushboo; Radhika Sarathkumar; Urvashi	Sri Lakshmi Venkateswara Cinemas	
M A R	11	Radhe Shyam (Note: Simultaneously shot in Hindi language.)	Radha Krishna Kumar	Prabhas; Pooja Hegde; Krishnam Raju; Sachin Khedekar; Priyadarshi Pulikonda; Murali Sharma; Bhagyashree; Sathyan; Kunaal Roy Kapur	UV Creations; T-Series	
M A R	18	Stand Up Rahul	Santo	Raj Tarun; Varsha Bollamma; Murali Sharma; Indraja; Vennela Kishore	Dream Town Productions; Highfive Pictures	
M A R	25	RRR	S. S. Rajamouli	N. T. Rama Rao Jr.; Ram Charan; Ajay Devgn; Alia Bhatt; Shriya Saran; Samuthirakani; Ray Stevenson; Alison Doody; Olivia Morris	DVV Entertainment	

== April–June ==
Opening		Title	Director	Cast	Production House	Ref.
A P R	1	Mishan Impossible	Swaroop RSJ	Taapsee Pannu; Harsh Roshan; Bhanu Prakshan; Jayateertha Molugu; Suhas Pagolu; Viva Harsha; Manikanta Varanasi; Jayateertha; Harsha Vardhan; Madhusudhan Rao; Satyam Rajesh; Ravindra Vijay	Matinee Entertainment	
A P R	8	Ghani	Kiran Korrapati	Varun Tej; Jagapathi Babu; Saiee Manjrekar; Upendra; Suniel Shetty; Naveen Chandra; Nadhiya; Naresh; Tanikella Bharani	Renaissance Pictures; Allu Bobby Company	
A P R	15	Bloody Mary	Chandoo Mondeti	Nivetha Pethuraj; Brahmaji; Ajay; Kireeti Damaraju	People Media Factory; Aha	
A P R	19	Zinga	Jaichanakar Chigurula	Sanjeev Devan; Sripriya; Sriram; Kasu Naveen Kumar	Renaissance Pictures; Dream Big Studios	
A P R	22	Bommala Koluvu	Swaroop RSJ	Hrishikesh; Priyanka Sharma; Malavika Satheesan; Subbu Vedula; Shivam Malhotra	Pruthvi Creations; Kickass Storytellers	
A P R	29	Acharya	Koratala Siva	Chiranjeevi; Ram Charan; Pooja Hegde; Sonu Sood	Konidela Production Company	
M A Y	6	Jayamma Panchayathi	Vijay Kumar Kalivarapu	Suma Kanakala	Vennela Creations	
M A Y	6	Bhala Thandanana	Chaitanya Dantluri	Sree Vishnu; Catherine Tresa; Ramachandra Raju; Posani Krishna Murali; Ravi Varma	Vaaraahi Chalana Chitram	
M A Y	6	Ashoka Vanamlo Arjuna Kalyanam	Vidya Sagar Chinta	Vishwak Sen; Rukshar Dhillon; Ritika Nayak; Goparaju Ramana	SVCC Digital	
M A Y	12	Sarkaru Vaari Paata	Parasuram	Mahesh Babu; Keerthy Suresh; Samuthirakani; Vennela Kishore; Nadhiya; Sowmya Menon; Subbaraju; Ajay; Brahmaji; Tanikella Bharani; Posani Krishna Murali; Mahesh Manjrekar; Ravi Prakash; Satyam Rajesh	Mythri Movie Makers; 14 Reels Plus; G. Mahesh Babu Entertainment	
M A Y	20	Shekar	Jeevitha	Rajasekhar; Athmiya Rajan; Muskaan Khubchandhani; Shivani Rajashekar; Kishore	Pegasus Cinecorp Taurus Cinecorp Sudhakar Impex IPL Tripura Creations	
M A Y	27	F3: Fun and Frustration	Anil Ravipudi	Venkatesh; Varun Tej; Tamannaah; Mehreen Pirzada; Anjali; Rajendra Prasad; Sunil; Sonal Chauhan; Rao Ramesh; Sangeetha; Ali; Tulasi; Satya; Pragathi; Annapurnamma; Y. Vijaya; Vennela Kishore; Raghu Babu; Srikanth Iyengar; Racha Ravi	Sri Venkateswara Creations	
J U N	3	Major	Sashi Kiran Tikka	Adivi Sesh; Sobhita Dhulipala; Saiee Manjrekar; Prakash Raj; Revathi; Murali Sharma	Sony Pictures; G. Mahesh Babu Entertainment; A+S Movies	
J U N	10	Ante Sundaraniki	Vivek Athreya	Nani; Nazriya Nazim; Harsha Vardhan; Suhas Pagolu; Rahul Ramakrishna; Naresh; Srikanth Iyengar; Rohini; Prudhvi Raj	Mythri Movie Makers	
J U N	10	Kinnerasani	Ramana Teja	Kalyaan Dhev; Ann Sheetal; Ravindra Vijay	SRT Entertainments, Shubham Entertainments	
J U N	10	Suraapanam	Sampath Kumar	Sampath Kumar; Pragya Nayan; Ajay Ghosh; Fish Venkat	Akhil Bhavya Creations	
J U N	17	Virata Parvam	Venu Udugula	Sai Pallavi; Rana Daggubati; Priyamani; Nandita Das; Naveen Chandra; Zarina Wahab; Easwari Rao; Sai Chand; Nivetha Pethuraj	Sri Lakshmi Venkateswara Cinemas; Suresh Productions	
J U N	17	Godse	Gopi Ganesh Pattabhi	Satyadev; Aishwarya Lekshmi; Brahmaji; Tanikella Bharani; Nagendra Babu; Prudhvi Raj; Noel Sean; Priyadarshi Pulikonda; Chaitanya Krishna	CK Screens	
J U N	23	Konda	Ram Gopal Varma	Thrigun; Irra Mor; Tulasi; L. B. Sriram	Shresta Patel Movies	
J U N	24	Sammathame	Gopinath Reddy	Kiran Abbavaram; Chandini Chowdary	UG Productions	
J U N	24	Chor Bazaar	B Jeeevan Reddy	Akash Puri; Gehana Sippy; Sunil; Posani Krishna Murali; Subbaraju	IV Productions	
J U N	24	Sadha Nannu Nadipe	Lanka Pratheek Prem Karan	Lanka Pratheek Prem Karan; Vaishnavi Patwardhan; Nagendra Babu; Nassar	Rahul Prem Movie Makers	
J U N	24	7 Days 6 Nights	M. S. Raju	Sumanth Ashwin; Meher Chahal; Rohan; Krithika Shetty	Wild Honey Production	
J U N	24	Gangster Gangaraju	Eeshaan Suryaah	Laksh Chadalavada; Vedieka Dutt; Vennela Kishore; Charandeep; Srikanth Iyengar	Sri Tirumala Tirupati Venkateswara Films	
J U N	24	Pellikuturu Party	Aparna Malladi	Prince Cecil; Aneesha Dama; Bhavana Vazhapandal; Sai Ketan Rao; Jaiyetri Makana; Kirrak Seetha; Annapurna (actress)	Pruthvi Creations	
J U N	30	Chittam Maharani	Akula Kasi Viswanath	Yazurved Gurram; Rachana Inder	Little Thoughts Cinemas	

== July–September ==
Opening		Title	Director	Cast	Production House	Ref.
J U L Y	1	Pakka Commercial	Maruthi	Gopichand; Raashi Khanna; Sathyaraj; Anasuya Bharadwaj; Rao Ramesh; Saptagiri	UV Creations; GA2 Pictures	
J U L Y	1	10th Class Diaries	Anji	Sriram; Avika Gor; Siva Balaji; Archana Shastry	SR Movie Makers; Anvitha Avani Kreation; Ajay Mysore Productions	
J U L Y	1	Shikaru	Hari Kolagani	Sai Dhanshika; Tej Kurapati; Abhinav Medisetty; Dheeraj Aathreya; Chammak Chandra	Sri Sai Lakshmi Creations	
J U L Y	8	October–December	Ritesh Rana	Lavanya Tripathi; Vennela Kishore	Mythri Movie Makers; Clap Entertainment	
J U L Y	14	The Warriorr	N. Lingusamy	Ram Pothineni; Aadhi Pinisetty; Krithi Shetty; Akshara Gowda; Nadhiya; Bharathiraja; Chirag Jani; Redin Kingsley	Srinivasa Silver Screen	
J U L Y	22	Thank You	Vikram Kumar	Naga Chaitanya; Raashi Khanna; Avika Gor; Malavika Nair; Sai Sushanth Reddy	Sri Venkateswara Creations	
J U L Y	29	Ramarao on Duty	Sarath Mandava	Ravi Teja; Divyansha Kaushik; Rajisha Vijayan; Venu Thottempudi; Nassar; Naresh; Pavitra Lokesh; John Vijay; Chaitanya Krishna; Tanikella Bharani; Rahul Ramakrishna; Madhusudhan Rao	Sri Lakshmi Venkateshwara Cinemas; RT Team Works	
A U G	5	Bimbisara	Mallidi Vashist	Nandamuri Kalyan Ram; Catherine Tresa; Samyuktha Menon; Warina Hussain; Vennela Kishore; Brahmaji; Srinivas Reddy	N. T. R. Arts	
A U G	5	Sita Ramam	Hanu Raghavapudi	Dulquer Salmaan; Mrunal Thakur; Rashmika Mandanna; Sumanth	Vyjayanthi Movies; Swapna Cinema	
A U G	12	Macherla Niyojakavargam	M.S. Raja Shekhar Reddy	Nithiin; Krithi Shetty; Catherine Tresa; Samuthirakani; Rajendra Prasad; Vennela Kishore; Indraja	Shresht Movies; Aditya Movies & Entertainments	
A U G	13	Karthikeya 2	Chandoo Mondeti	Nikhil Siddharth; Anupama Parameswaran; Anupam Kher; Srinivas Reddy	Abhishek Agarwal Arts; People Media Factory	
A U G	19	Tees Maar Khan	Kalyanji Gogana	Aadi Sai Kumar; Payal Rajput; Sunil; Poorna; Kabir Duhan Singh; Thakur Anoop Singh	Vision Cinemaas	
A U G	19	Highway	K. V. Guhan	Anand Deverakonda; Manasa Radhakrishna; Abhishek Banerjee; Saiyami Kher; John Vijay; Satya	Sree Iswarya Lakshmi Movies; Northstar Entertainment	
A U G	19	Wanted Pandugod	Sreedhar Seepana	Sunil; Sudigali Sudheer; Deepika Pilli; Srinivasa Reddy; Vennela Kishore; Saptagiri; Tanikella Bharani; Brahmanandam; Prudhviraj; Raghu Babu	United K Productions	
A U G	25	Liger	Puri Jagannadh	Vijay Deverakonda; Ananya Pandey; Mike Tyson; Ramya Krishnan; Ronit Roy; Ali; Makarand Deshpande; Getup Srinu	Dharma Productions; Puri Connects	
A U G	26	Odela Railway Station	Ashok Teja	Hebah Patel; Pujita Ponnada; Vasishta N. Simha; Sai Ronak; Gagan Vihari; Naga Mahesh	Sri Sathya Sai Arts	
S E P	2	Ranga Ranga Vaibhavanga	Gireesaaya	Panja Vaisshnav Tej; Ketika Sharma; Naveen Chandra; Ali; Subbaraju; Prabhu; Naresh	Sri Venkateswara Cine Chitra	
S E P	2	First Day First Show	Vamshidhar Goud	Srikanth Reddy; Sanchita; Ali; Tanikella Bharani; Vennela Kishore	Srija Entertainments Poornodaya Movie Creations; Mitravinda movies	
S E P	9	Oke Oka Jeevitham	Shree Karthick	Sharwanand; Amala Akkineni; Ritu Varma; Vennela Kishore; Priyadarshi Pulikonda; Nassar; Ali; Ravi Raghavendra; Yog Japee; Madhunandan	Dream Warrior Pictures	
S E P	9	Kotha Kothaga	Hanumaan Vasamsetty	Ajay Aman; Virti Vaghani	Funfilled Entertainments	
S E P	16	Aa Ammayi Gurinchi Meeku Cheppali	Mohana Krishna Indraganti	Sudheer Babu; Krithi Shetty; Vamsi Raghava Yenumula; Srinivas Avasarala; Vennela Kishore; Rahul Ramakrishna; Kunal Kaushik; Satish Saripalli	Benchmark Studios; Mythri Movie Makers	
S E P	16	Nenu Meeku Baaga Kavalsinavaadini	Sridhar Gadhe	Kiran Abbavaram; Sanjana Anand; Sonu Thakur; Siddharth Menon; S. V. Krishna Reddy; Baba Bhaskar; Sameer; Sangeetha	Kodi Divyaa Entertainments	
S E P	16	Saakini Daakini	Sudheer Varma	Nivetha Thomas; Regina Cassandra	Suresh Productions; Guru Films; Kross Pictures	
S E P	23	Krishna Vrinda Vihari	Anish R. Krishna	Naga Shaurya; Shirley Setia; Radhika Sarathkumar; Rahul Ramakrishna; Vennela Kishore; Satya; Brahmaji	Ira Creations	
S E P	23	Alluri	Pradeep Varma	Sree Vishnu; Kayadu Lohar; Tanikella Bharani; Suman; Raja Ravindra; Prudhvi Raj; Ravi Varma; Madhusudhan Rao Reddy	Lucky Media	
S E P	23	Dongalunnaru Jaagratha	Satish Tripura	Sri Simha; Samuthirakani; Preethi Asrani	Suresh Productions; Guru Films; Manzar Studios	

== October–December ==
Opening		Title	Director	Cast	Production House	Ref.
O C T	5	The Ghost	Praveen Sattaru	Nagarjuna Akkineni; Sonal Chauhan; Gul Panag; Anikha Surendran; Manish Chaudhari; Ravi Varma; Srikanth Iyengar	Sree Venkateswara Cinemas LLP; NorthStar Entertainment	
O C T	5	Godfather	Mohan Raja	Chiranjeevi; Salman Khan; Nayanthara; Satyadev	Konidela Production Company; Super Good Films	
O C T	5	Swathi Muthyam	Lakshman K Krishna	Bellamkonda Ganesh; Varsha Bollamma	Sithara Entertainments	
O C T	14	Boyfriend for Hire	Santosh Kambhampati	Viswant Duddumpudi; Malavika Satheesan; Harsha Vardhan; Madhunandan; Sudharshan	Swastika Cinema; Prime Show Entertainment	
O C T	14	Crazy Fellow		Aadi Saikumar; Digangana Suryavanshi; Mirnaa Menon; Anish Kuruvilla; Vinodhini Vaidyanathan; Saptagiri; Priya Hegde	Sri Sathya Sai Arts	
O C T	19	Ammu	Charukesh Sekar	Aishwarya Lekshmi; Naveen Chandra; Bobby Simha; Raja Ravindra; Parvathi T.; Appaji Ambarisha Darbha	Stone Bench Films	
O C T	21	Ginna	Suryaah	Vishnu Manchu; Payal Rajput; Sunny Leone; Sunil; Vennela Kishore	AVA Entertainment; 24 Frames Factory	
O C T	21	Ori Devuda	Ashwath Marimuthu	Vishwak Sen; Mithila Palkar; Venkatesh Daggubati; Asha Bhat; Rahul Ramakrishna	Sri Venkateswara Creations; PVP Cinema	
O C T	28	Anukoni Prayanam	Venkatesh Pediredla	Rajendra Prasad; Narasimha Raju; Prema; Tulasi; Ravi Babu; Subhalekha Sudhakar; Prabhas Sreenu	Apple Creations	
N O V	4	Like, Share & Subscribe	Merlapaka Gandhi	Santosh Sobhan; Faria Abdullah; Sudharshan; Brahmaji; Aadukalam Naren	Aamuktha Creations; Niharika Entertainment	
N O V	4	Urvasivo Rakshasivo	Rakesh Sashii	Allu Sirish; Anu Emmanuel; Sunil; Aamani; Vennela Kishore; Kedar Shankar	GA2 Pictures; Sri Tirumala Production	
N O V	5	Pratibimbalu	K. S. Prakash Rao; Singeetam Srinivasa Rao	Akkineni Nageswara Rao; Jayasudha; Tulasi	Vishnu Priya Cine Combines	
N O V	11	Yashoda	Hari–Harish	Samantha; Unni Mukundan; Varalaxmi Sarathkumar; Rao Ramesh; Murali Sharma; Sampath Raj; Shatru; Divya Sripada; Kalpika Ganesh	Sridevi Movies	
N O V	18	Masooda	Sai Kiran	Sangeetha; Thiruveer; Kavya Kalyan Ram; Subhalekha Sudhakar; Bandhavi Sridhar	Swadharm Entertainment	
N O V	25	Itlu Maredumilli Prajaneekam	AR Mohan	Allari Naresh; Anandhi; Vennela Kishore; Praveen; Sampath Raj	Zee Studios; Hasya Movies	
D E C	2	HIT: The Second Case	Sailesh Kolanu	Adivi Sesh; Meenakshi Chaudhary; Suhas Pagolu; Rao Ramesh; Posani Krishna Murali; Tanikella Bharani; Komalee Prasad; Bhanu Chander	Wall Poster Cinema	
D E C	9	Mukhachitram	Sandeep Raj	Vikas Vasishta; Priya Vadlamani; Chaitanya Rao Madadi; Ayesha Khan; Sunil; Vishwak Sen; P. Ravi Shankar	Pocket Money Pictures	
D E C	9	Panchathantram	Harsha Pulipaka	Brahmanandam; Swathi Reddy; Samuthirakani; Shivatmika Rajashekar; Rahul Vijay	Ticket Factory; S Originals	
D E C	9	Dangerous	Ram Gopal Varma	Naina Ganguly; Apsara Rani; Rajpal Yadav	Artsee Media	
D E C	16	Shasana Sabha				
D E C	23	18 Pages	Palnati Surya Pratap	Nikhil Siddhartha; Anupama Parameswaran	GA2 Pictures; Sukumar Writings	
D E C	23	Dhamaka	Trinadha Rao Nakkina	Ravi Teja; Sree Leela; Jayaram; Sachin Khedekar; Tanikella Bharani; Rao Ramesh; Chirag Jani; Ali; Praveen; Hyper Aadi; Pavitra Lokesh; Tulasi; Rajshree Nair	People Media Factory; Abhishek Agarwal Arts	
D E C	30	Top Gear	Shashikanth	Aadi SaiKumar; Riya Suman; Brahmaji; Mime Gopi	M/s. Sri Dhanalakshmi Productions	
D E C	30	Raajahyogam	Ram Ganapathi	Sai Ronak; Ankita Saha; Bismi Naas; Ajay Ghosh	Sri Navabala Creations; Vaishnavi Nataraj Productions	
D E C	30	Lucky Lakshman	AR Abhi	Syed Sohel; Mokksha; Devi Prasad; Raja Ravindra; Sameer Hasan	Dattatreya Media	
D E C	30	S5 No Exit	Sunny Komalapati	Taraka Ratna; P. Sai Kumar; Ali; Sunil; Prince Cecil	Saaga Entertainments	
D E C	30	Nuvve Naa Pranam	Srikrishna Malisetti	Kiran Raj; Priya Hedge	Varun Krishna Films	
D E C	31	Korameenu	Sripathy Karri	Anand Ravi; Anveesha; Kishori Dhatrak	Full Bottle Entertainment	

=== Film Festival Events ===
- Zee Cine Awards Telugu 2022 - Zee Telugu
- Star Maa Pariwar Awards 2022 - Star Maa

== See also ==
- List of Telugu films of 2021
- Lists of Telugu-language films
- List of Telugu films of 2023
