= Sunitha Tati =

Indian film producer

- Born: Vijayawada, Andhra Pradesh, India
- Occupation: Film Producer

Sunitha Tati is an Indian film producer who produces Telugu films under Guru Films. Her notable productions include Achcham Yenbadhu Madamaiyada (2016) and Oh! Baby (2019).

== Early life ==
Tati was born and brought up in Vijayawada, Andhra Pradesh, India. She completed her bachelor's degree in business management from George Mason University and went on to do her PG course in filmmaking from New York University.

== Career ==
Before starting in the film industry, Tati worked in TV9 as well as Radio Mirchi. She worked under D. Suresh Babu of Ramanaidu Studios and worked as an assistant director of various films including Malliswari, Jayam Manadera and Nagesh Kukunoor’s Hyderabad Blues.

In 2016, she worked with Gautham Vasudev Menon as a producer for Achcham Yenbadhu Madamaiyada and also its Telugu version Sahasam Swasaga Sagipo. In 2019, she produced B. V. Nandini Reddy-directed Oh! Baby, starring Samantha Akkineni and Lakshmi, along with People’s Media Productions and Suresh Productions.

Her upcoming film, Saakini Daakini is directed by Sudheer Varma. Starring Regina Cassandra and Nivetha Thomas, the film is a remake of the Korean film Midnight Runners. As of August 2021, she is also working on the comedy film Dongalunnaru Jaagratha in a collaboration with Suresh Productions. Written and directed by Satish Tripura, the film stars Sri Simha and Samuthirakani.

== Other work ==
Apart from movies, Tati is an active Rotarian. She also serves as a trustee and founding member of the Support Cancer Awareness Foundation, an NGO based in Hyderabad.

A strong believer in Ayurveda, she co-created a book series called Ayurveda Chronicles, with a California-based author.

== Filmography ==
=== Film ===
Year	Title	Language	Notes
2011	Shor in the City	Hindi	As executive producer
2015	Bangaru Kodipetta	Telugu	
2014	Tamilselvanum Thaniyar Anjalum	Tamil	
2016	Courier Boy Kalyan	Telugu	
2016	Achcham Enbadhu Madamaiyada	Tamil	
2016	Sahasam Swasaga Sagipo	Telugu	As co-producer
2019	Oh! Baby	Telugu	
2020	Maa Vintha Gaadha Vinuma	Telugu	Also played the role of Vinitha's mother
2022	Saakini Daakini	Telugu	
2022	Dongalunnaru Jaagratha	Telugu	
TBA	Kadhal 2 Kalyanam	Tamil	Unreleased

=== Television ===
Year	Title	Network
2015–2018	America Ammayi	Zee Telugu
2017	OK Jaanu	MAA TV
2025	Touch Me Not	JioHotstar

== Awards and nominations ==
Year	Ceremony	Category	Work	Result
2015	4th South Indian International Movie Awards	Best Debutant Producer	Bangaru Kodipetta	Nominated
