= D. Suresh Babu =

Indian film producer (born 1958)

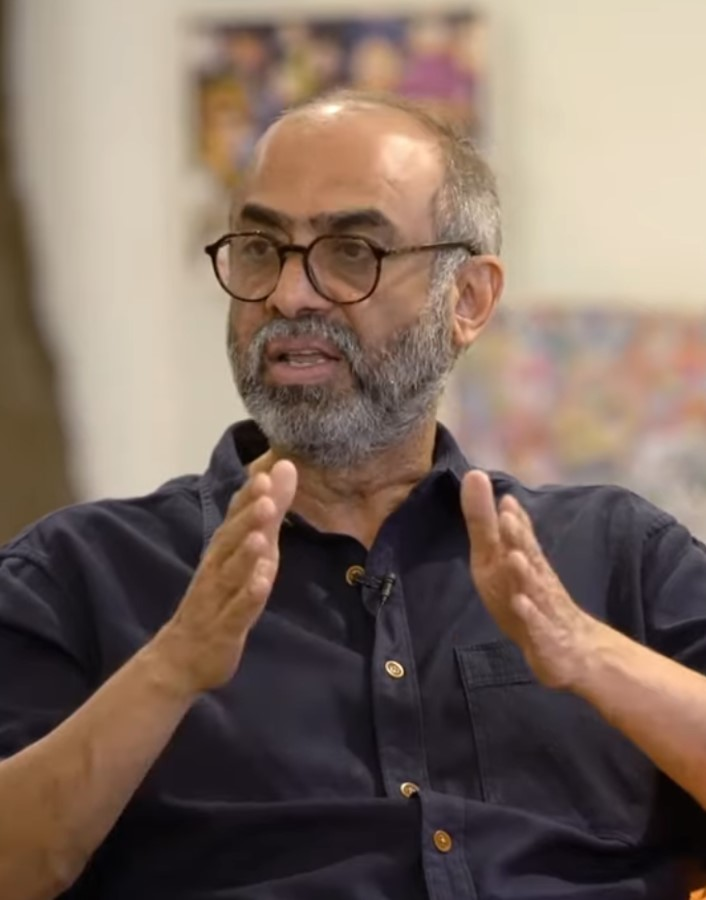
- Suresh Babu in December 2019
- Born: Daggubati Suresh Babu; 24 December 1958 (age 67); Hyderabad, Telangana, India
- Education: University of Michigan, College of Engineering, Guindy
- Occupation: Film producer
- Years active: 1990-present
- Spouse: Lakshmi
- Children: 3, including Rana Daggubati
- Parent: D. Ramanaidu
- Relatives: See Daggubati-Akkineni Family
- Awards: National Film Awards (1); Nandi Awards (4)
- Website: sureshproductions.com

Daggubati Suresh Babu (born 24 December 1958) is an Indian film producer, studio owner and film distributor who serves as the managing director of Suresh Productions. He is the elder brother of popular telugu actor Venkatesh and father of another popular actor Rana Daggubati. In 2012, he received the Andhra Pradesh state Nagireddy–Chakrapani National Award for his contribution to popular cinema.

He has produced several Telugu-language films under Suresh Productions banner including Bobbili Raja, Coolie No.1, Preminchukundam Raa, Ganesh, Kalisundam Raa, Jayam Manade Raa, Nuvvu leka nenu lenu, Malliswari, Tulasi, Drushyam and Gopala Gopala.

== Early life ==
He is the son of the producer D. Ramanaidu and elder brother of popular actor Venkatesh. He did his schooling from Don Bosco school in Madras. He completed his PUC from Loyola College, a gold medalist from College of Engineering, Guindy and graduated from University of Michigan in 1981 with a degree in mechanical engineering.

He is married to Lakshmi and they have three children, Rana Daggubati, Malavika Daggubati and Abhiram Daggubati.

== Career ==
He started his career with the film Devatha in 1982, though he started putting his name as producer from Bobbili Raja onwards.

== Filmography ==
=== As a producer ===
List of films produced
Year	Title	Director	Notes
1990	Bobbili Raja	B Gopal	
1991	Coolie No.1	K.Raghavendra Rao	
1994	Super Police	K. Murali Mohan Rao	
1997	Preminchukundam Raa	Jayanth C. Paranjee	
1998	Ganesh	Tirupathi Swamy	Won the Nandi Award for Best Feature Film (Bronze)
2000	Kalisundam Raa	UdayShankar	Won the National Film Award for Best Feature Film in Telugu; Won the Nandi Award for Best Feature Film for (Gold); Remade in Hindi as Kuch Tum Kaho Kuch Hum Kahein
2000	Jayam Manade Raa	N.Shankar	
2002	Nuvvu leka nenu lenu	Kashi Viswanath	
2003	Neeku Nenu Naaku Nuvvu	K.C Rajsekar	Won the Nandi Award for Akkineni Award for Best Home-viewing Feature Film
2004	Malliswari	K. Vijaya Bhaskar	Won the Nandi Award for Akkineni Award for Best Home-viewing Feature Film
2005	Soggadu	Ravi Babu	
2007	Tulasi	Boyapati Srinu	
2008	Baladur	UdayShankar	
2013	Masala	K. Vijaya Bhaskar	Remake of Bol Bachchan; Co-produced with Ravi Kishore
2014	Bhimavaram Bullodu	UdayShankar	
2014	Drushyam	Sripriya	Remake of Drishyam; Co-produced with Rajkumar Theatres Pvt Ltd and Wide Angle Creations
2015	Gopala Gopala	Kishore Kumar Pardasany	Remake Of Oh My God; Co-produced with North Star Entertainments Pvt. Ltd.
2015	Avunu 2	Ravi Babu	Sequel to Avunu; Co-produced with Flying Frogs
2017	Nene Raju Nene Mantri	Teja	Co-produced with Blue Planet Entertainments
2018	Ee Nagaraniki Emaindhi	Tharun Bhascker	
2019	Oh! Baby	B. V. Nandini Reddy	
2019	Venky Mama	K. S. Ravindra	
2021	Narappa	Srikanth Addala	
2021	Drushyam 2	Jeethu Joseph	Co-produced with Aashirvad Cinemas and RajKumar Theatres Pvt. Ltd.
2022	Saakini Daakini	Sudheer Varma	Co-produced with Guru Films and Kross Pictures
2022	Dongalunnaru Jaagratha	Satish Tripura	Co-produced with Guru Films
2022	Prince	Anudeep KV	Co-produced with Sree Venkateswara Cinemas LLP
2022	Rajahmundry Rose Milk	Naani Bandreddi	Co-produced with Introupe Films
2026	Cheekatilo	Sharan Koppisetty	

=== As a presenter ===
List of films presented
Year	Title	Director	Ref.
2008	Ashta Chamma	Mohan Krishna Indraganti	
2010	Namo Venkatesa	Srinu Vytla	
2011	Golconda High School	Mohan Krishna Indraganti	
2012	Eega	S. S. Rajamouli	
2013	Prema Ishq Kaadhal	Pavan sadineni	
2013	Uyyala Jampala	Virinchi Varma	
2015	Hora Hori	Teja	
2015	Thanu Nenu	Ram Mohan.P	
2016	Pelli Choopulu	Tharun Bhascker Dhaassyam	
2016	Pittagoda	Anudeep K. V.	
2017	Mental Madhilo	Vivek Athreya	
2022	Virata Parvam	Venu Udugula	

== Awards and nominations ==
List of awards and nominations
Year	Ceremony	Category	Nominee	Result	Ref.
1999	National Film Awards	Best Feature Film Telugu	Kalisundam Raa	Won	
2012	Filmfare Awards South	Filmfare Award for Best Film – Telugu	Eega	Won	
1998	Nandi Awards	Nandi Award for Best Feature Film (Bronze)	Ganesh	Won	
1999	Nandi Awards	Nandi Award for Best Feature Film (Gold)	Kalisundam Raa	Won	
2003	Nandi Awards	Best Home-viewing Feature Film	Neeku Nenu Naaku Nuvvu	Won	
2004	Nandi Awards	Best Home-viewing Feature Film	Malliswari	Won	
2012	Nagireddy-Chakrapani National Award	Various films		Won	
2015	TSR – TV9 National Film Awards	Best Film	Drushyam	Won	

== Other works ==
- He served as the president of the Telugu Film Chamber of Commerce for the year 2011–12.
- He has been unanimously elected the president of Telugu Film Chamber of Commerce (TFCC) from 2015 to 2017. He is the first president of the body after AP Film Chamber of Commerce was renamed Telugu Film Chamber of Commerce.
- He is also associated with Hyderabad Angels as vice president.
