= Oh! Baby (2019 film) =

2019 Indian film by B. V. Nandini Reddy

- Theatrical release poster
- Directed by: B. V. Nandini Reddy
- Screenplay by: B. V. Nandini Reddy
- Based on: Miss Granny by: Shin Dong-ik; Hong Yun-jeong; Dong Hee-seon
- Produced by: D. Suresh Babu; Sunitha Tati; T. G. Vishwa Prasad
- Starring: Samantha Ruth Prabhu; Lakshmi
- Cinematography: Richard Prasad
- Edited by: Junaid Siddiqui
- Music by: Mickey J. Meyer
- Production companies: Suresh Productions; People Media Factory; Guru Films; Kross Pictures
- Release date: 5 July 2019
- Running time: 161 minutes
- Country: India
- Language: Telugu
- Budget: ₹16–20 crore
- Box office: est. ₹33.9–40 crore

Oh! Baby is a 2019 Indian Telugu-language fantasy comedy film directed by B. V. Nandini Reddy. The film stars Samantha Ruth Prabhu and Lakshmi. A remake of the 2014 South Korean film Miss Granny directed by Hwang Dong-hyuk, the plot follows a woman in her 70s (Lakshmi) who magically finds herself turned into her own physical 24-year-old self (Samantha) after having her picture taken at a mysterious photo studio. Naga Shaurya, Rajendra Prasad, Rao Ramesh, and Teja Sajja play supporting roles. The music was composed by Mickey J. Meyer.

Principal photography of the film began in December 2018. The film released theatrically on 5 July 2019 and received positive reviews, with praise for Samantha's performance. It was a commercial success. A Hindi remake is in development by Sajid Nadiadwala titled Jabudani.

== Plot ==
Lecturer Shekhar / Nani explains the behavior of old people and talks about his mother Baby. She works in a canteen of her own in the same college which is co-owned by her childhood friend Pasupuleti Kanakaraj / Chanti. At a young age, she dreams of becoming a great singer, which does not come true. Right now, she aspires her grandson Ramakrishna “Rocky” to fulfill her goal. However, her relationship with her daughter-in-law Madhavi does not run on good terms. Things get worse when Madhavi gets a heart attack and does not want to live with Baby. Even the doctors suggest the same.

Vikram and Swathi begin spending a lot of time together, and she too starts taking an interest in him.

By this time Nani also realizes that she is his mother. But after reaching the hospital she finds Rocky requires AB-type blood which Baby donates, even after the refusal of Chanti and Nani, by stating that she is first and foremost Nani's mother and would always be there for him and his children and transforms back into an old lady.

After she returns, her family also realizes her value and she in turn is also more friendly with them as they can be seen enjoying a performance by Rocky (after his recovery). In the end, God transforms Chanti into a young man, who comes to pick up Baby.

== Cast ==
- Lakshmi as 70-year-old Savitri alias "Baby"
  - Samantha Ruth Prabhu as young Savithri alias Swathi (Voice dubbed by Chinmayi)
- Rajendra Prasad as Pasupuleti Kanakaraju aka "Chanti", Baby's childhood friend
  - Naga Chaitanya as young Chanti (cameo appearance)
- Naga Shourya as Vikram, Swathi's boyfriend
- Rao Ramesh as Lecturer Shekhar alias "Nani", Baby's son
- Teja Sajja as Ramakrishna “Rocky”, Baby’s grandson and Shekar's son
- Pragathi as Madhavi, Baby’s daughter-in-law and Shekar's wife;Rocky's mother
- Aneesha Dama as Divya, Baby's granddaughter and Shekar's daughter
- Urvashi as Sulochana, Chanti's cousin
- Sunaina as Anasuya, Chanti's daughter who had a Tom and Jerry relationship with Baby
- Aishwarya as Vikram's mother
- Snigdha as Jahnavi, Vikram's assistant
- Raja Ravindra as Inspector Sarma, an officer appointed to investigate Baby's missing
- Mirchi Hemanth as Anji, Rocky's friend and band member
- Shreyas Wannere as Asif, Rocky's friend and band member
- Dhanraj as an eve teaser

Cameo appearances

- Jagapathi Babu as God who gives another life to Baby
- Adivi Sesh as Savitri's husband and Shekar's father
- Suma Kanakala as Suma, a TV anchor who gives life advice to Baby on TV
- B. V. Nandini Reddy as a doctor

== Production ==
During November 2018, pre-production of an untitled film commenced with costume selection. Initially titled as "O Baby" with the tagline "Yentha Sakkagunnave" with Samantha in the lead role, the full title was revealed to be O Baby! Yentha Sakkagunnave in December 2018, being bankrolled by Sunitha Tati, People's Media Factory and Suresh Productions. The film's title was taken from one of her songs "Yentha Sakkagunnave", which describes the beauty of Samantha in the film, Rangasthalam.

Apart from Samantha, Rao Ramesh, Snigdha, Naga Shourya, Lakshmi and Rajendra Prasad appear in supporting roles. Principal photography began in December 2018. The film was wrapped in mid May 2019.

== Soundtrack ==
Oh! Baby

Soundtrack album by Mickey J. Meyer
- Released: 30 June 2019
- Recorded: 2018–2019
- Genre: Feature film soundtrack
- Length: "19:31"
- Language: Telugu
- Label: Aditya Music
- Producer: Mickey J. Meyer

Mickey J. Meyer chronology
| Srinivasa Kalyanam (2018) | Oh! Baby (2019) | Gaddalakonda Ganesh (2019) |

Music composed by Mickey J. Meyer and released on Aditya Music company.

Track listing
| No. | Title | Lyrics | Singer(s) | Length |
|---|---|---|---|---|
| 1. | "Oh! Baby" | Lakshmi Bhupala | Anurag Kulkarni | 4:04 |
| 2. | "Naalo Maimarapu" | Bhaskarabhatla | Mohana Bhogaraju | 3:48 |
| 3. | "Anaganaganaga" | Lakshmi Bhupala | Sreerama Chandra | 3:07 |
| 4. | "Aakasham lona" | Lakshmi Bhupala | Nutana Mohan | 3:49 |
| 5. | "Maha Adbhutham" | Bhaskarabhatla | Nutana Mohan | 3:21 |
| 6. | "Changubhala" | Bhaskarabhatla | Nutana Mohan | 4:29 |
| Total length: | | | | 19:31 |

== Marketing and release ==
The first look of film presenting Samantha Akkineni was released on 21 May 2019. The teaser of the film released on 25 May. The official theatrical trailer of the film was released on 20 June by Suresh Productions.

The movie was planned to be released on 5 July 2019, along with its dubbed version in Tamil language; it was released in India at this time, and in Kuwait and the United States on July 4, a day earlier. Official streaming partner is Netflix.

== Reception ==
=== Critical reception ===
The Times of India gave 3.5 out of 5 stars stating "Save for moments in the latter part of the film which are a tad bit melodramatic, Oh! Baby is an enjoyable ride. It's a film that has its heart in the right place and has a lot of great moments to take away from. Nandini Reddy has successfully adapted Korean classic Miss Granny, and has made it her own, and Tollywood is richer for it". The Indian Express gave 3 out of 5 stars stating "Samantha Akkineni thrives in the role that reflects the possibilities of youth, the burden of old age, and the society’s indifference to the desires and complaints of old people. Written by director BV Nandini Reddy and Lakshmi Bhupala, the film convincingly captures the circle of life". The News Minute gave 4 out of 5 stars stating "Adopting the body language of a 70-year-old is difficult, but Samantha gives it a reverent, comic touch in this Nandini Reddy directorial".

Deccan Chronicle gave 3.5 out of 5 stars stating "Oh! Baby is a fun film with an emotional touch that is neatly narrated by director Nandini Reddy. The film takes Samantha up a notch, and proves that she can carry a film by herself. They are supported by Rajendra Prasad and Lakshmi". Firstpost gave 4 out of 5 stars stating "Oh! Baby is a treasure box. Open it, dig into it, and cherish everything that it has to offer you. There’s a lot more to this film than just laughs. It’s like sunshine on a gloomy day. It’s a heart-warming film that you won't forget anytime soon". India Today gave 3 out of 5 stars stating "Oh! Baby, directed by Nandini Reddy, is everything nice and fine. It makes you understand the struggles your grandmother had to undergo and appreciate the life you have now. Watch it for Samantha and Rajendra Prasad's career-best performances".

Sangeetha Devi Dundoo of The Hindu wrote "Oh! Baby is a fun ode to the complexities that make up our elders. It’s an acknowledgement of their rough rides as much as it is about learning to count your blessings". Sify gave 3 out of 5 stars stating "Official remake of Korean drama Miss Granny, Samantha starrer Oh Baby is watchable for Samantha's energetic performance. Schmaltzy ending and flabby runtime almost kill the film but it finally works to an extent thanks to Samantha. This is for those who like candy-floss sentiment dramas".

== Accolades ==
List of accolades
| Date of ceremony | Award | Category | Recipient(s) and nominee(s) | Result | Ref. |
|---|---|---|---|---|---|
| 28 March 2020 | Critics Choice Film Awards | Best Actor – Male | Rajendra Prasad | Nominated | |
| 28 March 2020 | Critics Choice Film Awards | Best Actor – Female | Samantha | Won | |
| 28 March 2020 | Critics Choice Film Awards | Best Actor – Female | Lakshmi | Nominated | |
| 28 March 2020 | Critics Choice Film Awards | Best Writing | B. V. Nandini Reddy | Nominated | |
| 28 March 2020 | Critics Choice Film Awards | Best Director | B. V. Nandini Reddy | Nominated | |
| 18 September 2021 | 9th South Indian International Movie Awards | Best Director | B. V. Nandini Reddy | Nominated | |
| 18 September 2021 | 9th South Indian International Movie Awards | Best Actress | Samantha | Won | |
| 18 September 2021 | 9th South Indian International Movie Awards | Best Supporting Actor | Rajendra Prasad | Nominated | |
| 18 September 2021 | 9th South Indian International Movie Awards | Best Supporting Actress | Lakshmi | Won | |
| 2020 | Zee Cine Awards Telugu | Best Actor in a Leading Role – Female | Samantha | Won | |
| 2020 | Zee Cine Awards Telugu | Favourite Heroine | Samantha | Nominated | |

== See also ==
- Mack & Rita, 2022 Hollywood film with similar premise
