= Suresh Productions =

Indian film production company

- Type: Private
- Industry: Entertainment
- Founded: 1964
- Founder: D. Ramanaidu
- Headquarters: Hyderabad, Telangana, India
- Area served: India
- Key people: D. Suresh Babu; Venkatesh; Rana Daggubati
- Products: Films
- Services: Film production, Film distribution
- Owner: D. Suresh Babu
- Parent: Ramanaidu Studios
- Subsidiaries: Suresh Movies Film Distributors; Ramanaidu Film School
- Website: Suresh Productions

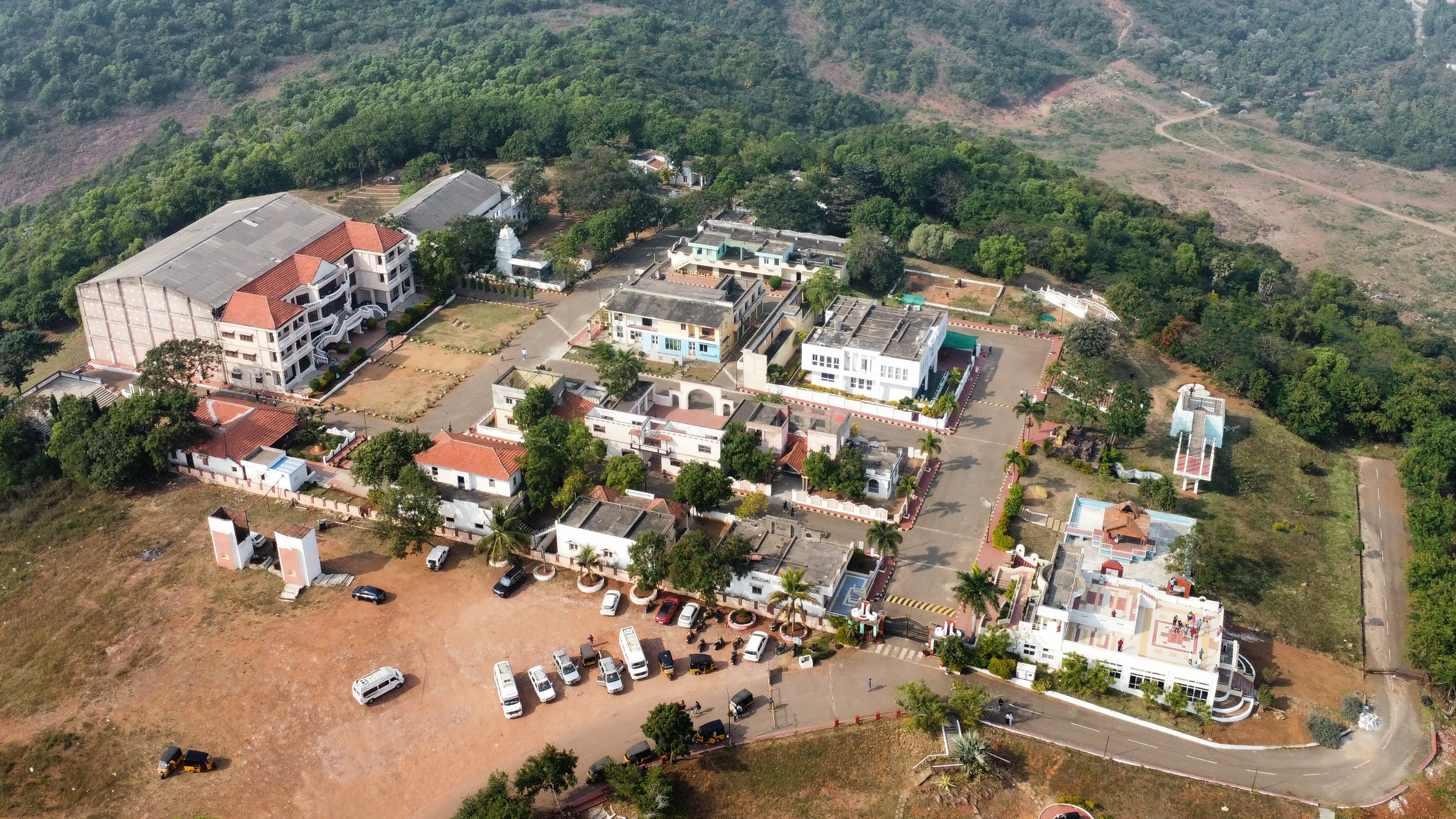
Aerial view of Ramanaidu studios, Visakhapatnam

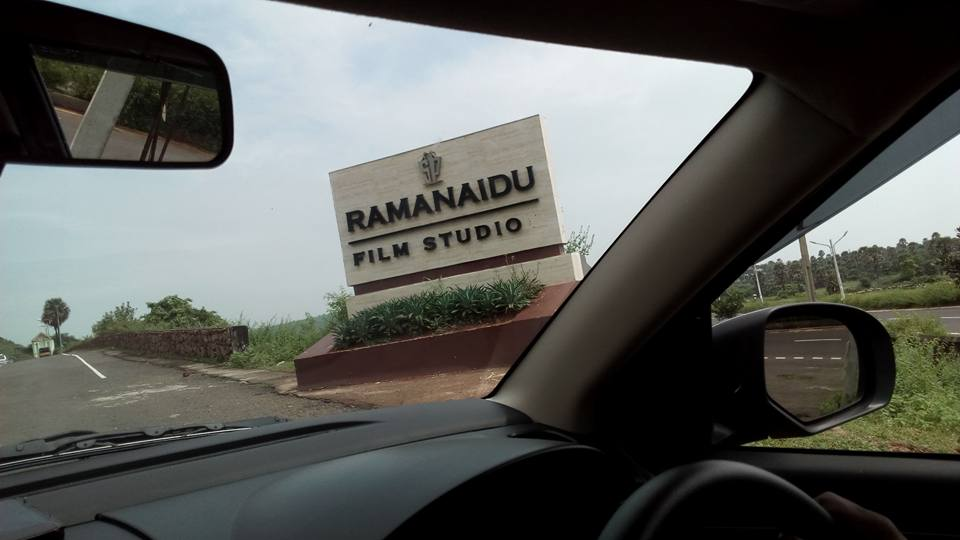
Rama Naidu Studios entrance

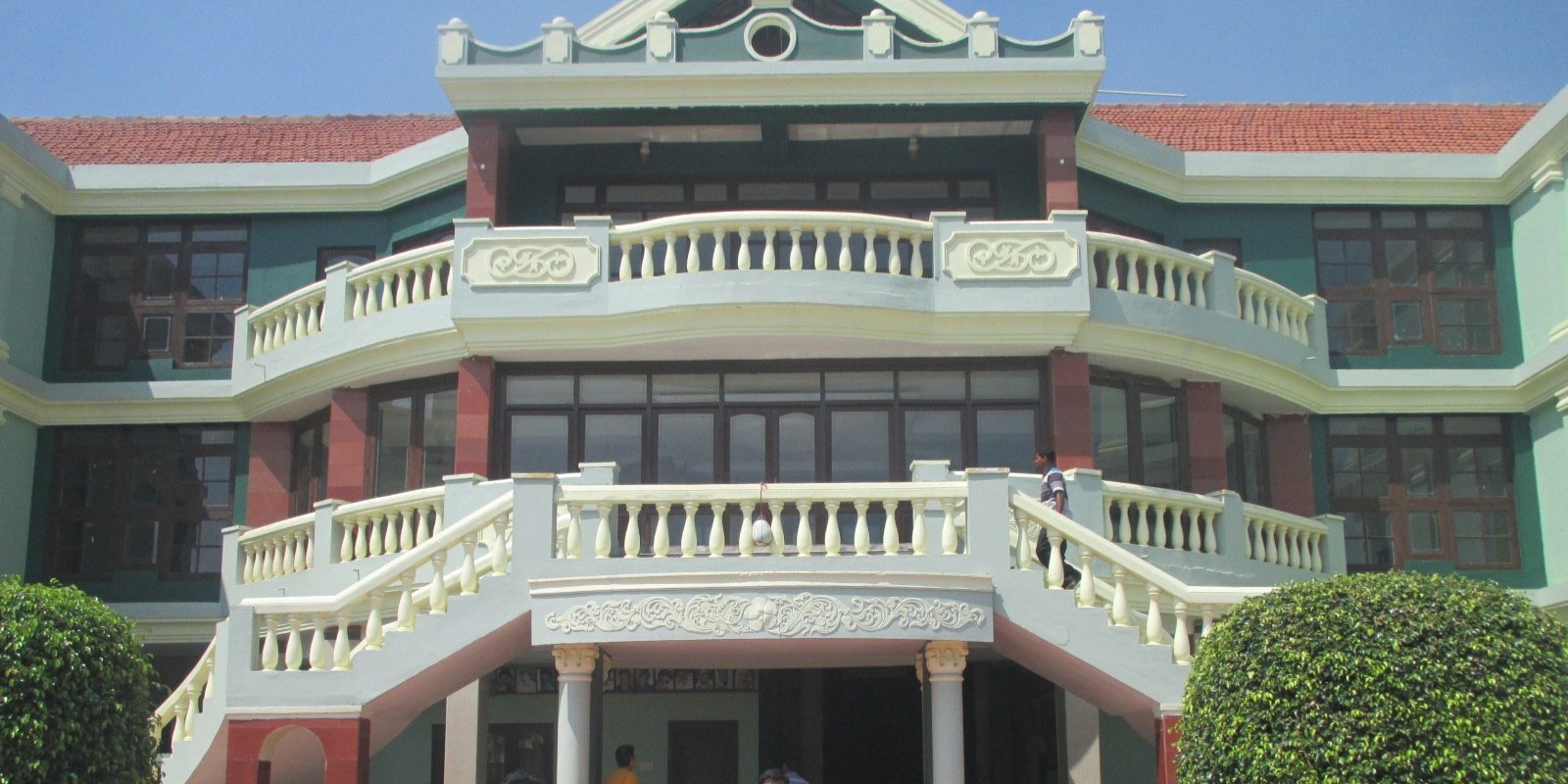
A setup of house

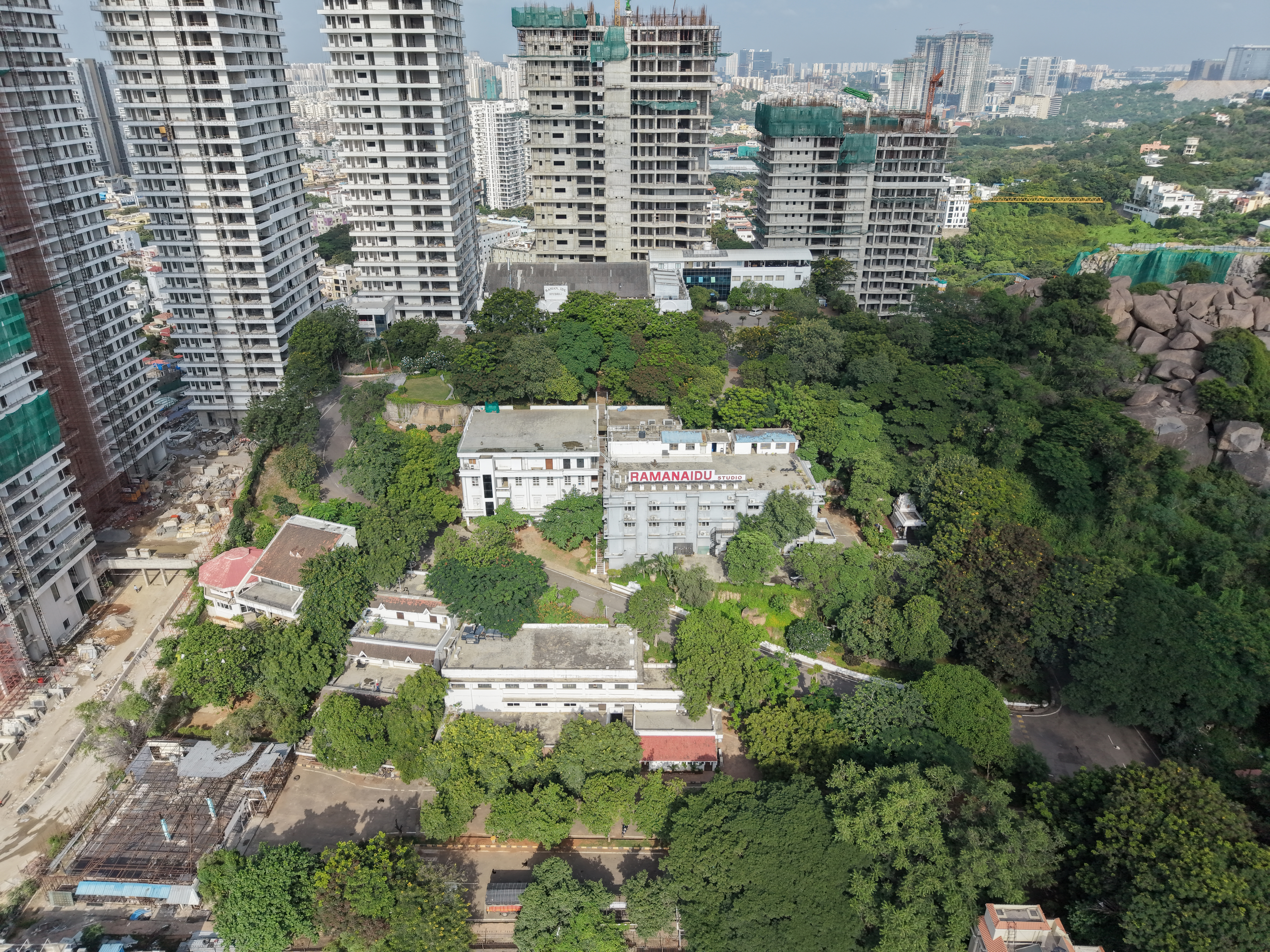
Ramanaidu studios at Film Nagar, Hyderabad

Suresh Productions (also known as Suresh Movies, Vijaya Suresh Combines) is an Indian film production and distribution company known for its works in Telugu cinema. It is established in 1964 by D. Ramanaidu. It is one of India's largest film production companies with over 50 years of experience. The production house is located in Ramanaidu Studios, Hyderabad.

Suresh Productions has produced more than 150 films in 13 Indian languages, majority of them in the Telugu language. The first film produced by the company was Ramudu Bheemudu with N. T. Rama Rao in 1964. Suresh Productions launched the careers of directors such as B. Gopal, Jayanth C. Paranjee, Muppalaneni Shiva, Tirupathi Swamy, and Uday Shankar and four music directors.

== Filmography ==
Year	Movie name	Language	Director	Notes
1964	Ramudu Bheemudu	Telugu	Tapi Chanakya	
1965	Pratignapalana	Telugu	C. S. Rao	
1966	Sri Krishna Tulabharam	Telugu	Kamalakara Kameswara Rao	
1967	Stree Janma	Telugu	K.S. Prakash Rao	
1968	Papa Kosam	Telugu	GVR Seshagiri Rao	
1969	Sipayi Chinnayya	Telugu	GVR Seshagiri Rao	
1969	Bommalu Cheppina Katha	Telugu	G. Viswanatham	
1970	Drohi	Telugu	K. Bapayya	
1971	Prema Nagar	Telugu	K. S. Prakash Rao	
1972	Vasantha Maligai	Tamil	K. S. Prakash Rao	Remake of Prema Nagar
1973	Jeevana Tarangalu	Telugu	T. Rama Rao	
1974	Prem Nagar	Hindi	K. S. Prakash Rao	Remake of Prema Nagar
1974	Chakravakam	Telugu	V. Madhusudhana Rao	
1975	Soggadu	Telugu	K. Bapayya	
1975	Ammaila Sapatham	Telugu	GVR Seshagiri Rao	
1976	Secretary	Telugu	K. S. Prakash Rao	
1977	Moratodu	Telugu	CK. Nagesh	
1977	Savasagallu	Telugu	B. Subba Rao	
1977	Dildaar	Hindi	K. Bapayya	Remake of Soggadu
1978	Chilipi Krishnudu	Telugu	B. Subba Rao	
1978	Dil Aur Deewaar	Hindi	K. Bapayya	Remake of Jeevana Tarangalu
1979	Oka Challani Ratri	Telugu	K. Vasu	
1979	Mande Gundelu	Telugu	K. Bapayya	
1980	Kaksha	Telugu	V. C. Guhanathan	
1980	Bandish	Hindi	K. Bapayya	Remake of Chilipikrishnudu
1981	Prema Mandiram	Telugu	Dasari Narayana Rao	
1981	Agni Poolu	Telugu	K. Bapayya	Based on novel of same name
1982	Thanikattu Raja	Tamil	V. C. Guhanathan	
1982	Devatha	Telugu	K. Raghavendra Rao	
1983	Mundadugu	Telugu	K. Bapayya	
1983	Sangharshana	Telugu	K. Murali Mohan Rao	
1984	Tohfa	Hindi	K. Raghavendra Rao	Remake of Devatha
1984	Maqsad	Hindi	K. Bapayya	Remake of Mundadugu
1984	Kathanayakudu	Telugu	K. Murali Mohan Rao	
1985	Mangalya Balam	Telugu	B. Subba Rao	
1985	Deiva Piravi	Tamil	R. Krishnamoorthy	Remake of Devatha
1985	Sri Katna Leealu	Telugu	Paruchuri Brothers	
1986	Pratidwani	Telugu	B. Gopal	
1986	Dilwaala	Hindi	K. Murali Mohan Rao	Remake of Kathanayakudu
1986	Kaliyuga Pandavulu	Telugu	K. Raghavendra Rao	
1986	Insaaf Ki Awaaz	Hindi	B. Gopal	Remake of Pratidhwani
1987	Ramu	Telugu	Y. Nageswara Rao	
1987	Aha Naa Pellanta	Telugu	Jandhyala	
1987	Gurubrahma	Telugu	B. Subba Rao	
1987	Michael Raj	Tamil	V. C. Guhanathan	
1988	Kai Naattu	Tamil	V. C. Guhanathan	
1988	Chinababu	Telugu	A. Mohan Gandhi	
1988	Brahma Putrudu	Telugu	Dasari Narayana Rao	Remake of Michael Raj
1989	Prema	Telugu	Suresh Krishna	
1989	Indrudu Chandrudu	Telugu	Suresh Krishna	
1989	Rakhwala	Hindi	K. Murali Mohan Rao	Remake of Michael Raj
1990	Bobbili Raja	Telugu	B. Gopal	
1990	Jeevan Ek Sanghursh	Hindi	Rahul Rawail	
1991	Sarpayagam	Telugu	Paruchuri Brothers	
1991	Coolie No. 1	Telugu	K. Ragavendra Rao	
1991	Prema Khaidi	Telugu	E V V Satyanarayana	
1991	Prem Qaidi	Hindi	K. Murali Mohan Rao	Remake of Telugu film Prema Khaidi
1991	Thavarumane Udugore	Kannada	Om Sai Prakash	Remake of Puttinti Pattu Cheera
1992	Prema Vijeta	Telugu	K. Sada Siva Rao	
1992	Surigaadu	Telugu	Dasari Narayana Rao	
1993	Santaan	Hindi	Dasari Narayana Rao	Remake of Surigaadu
1993	Paruvu Pratishta	Telugu	V. C. Guhanathan	
1993	Andhra Vaibhavam	Telugu	MR. Rajaji	
1993	Anari	Hindi	K. Murali Mohan Rao	Remake of Chinna Thambi
1994	Super Police	Telugu	K. Murali Mohan Rao	
1994	Thodi Kodallu	Telugu	B. Subba Rao	
1995	Taqdeerwala	Hindi	K. Murali Mohan Rao	Remake of Yamaleela
1995	Taj Mahal	Telugu	Muppalaneni Shiva	
1995	Konadapalli Rattayya	Telugu	Dasari Narayana Rao	
1996	Tata Manavadu	Telugu	K. Sada Siva Rao	
1996	Naidu Gari Kutumbam	Telugu	B. Subba Rao	
1996	Oho Naa Pellanta	Telugu	Jandhyala	
1996	Dharma Chakram	Telugu	Suresh Krishna	
1997	Super Heroes	Telugu	AVS	
1997	Preminchukundam Raa	Telugu	Jayanth C. Paranjee	
1998	Ganesh	Telugu	Thirupathisamy	
1998	Sivayya	Telugu	Suresh Varma	
1999	Preyasi Rave	Telugu	Chandra Mahesh	
1999	Peddamanushulu	Telugu	B. Subba Rao	
1999	Asukh	Bengali	Rituparno Ghosh	
1999	Sudhu Ekbar Bolo	Bengali	Prabhat Roy	Remake of Pellichesikundam
1999	Hum Aapke Dil Mein Rehte Hain	Hindi	Satish Kaushik	Remake of Pavithra Bandham
2000	Kalisundam Raa	Telugu	Udayasankar	
2000	Jayam Manade Raa	Telugu	N.Shankar	
2000	Aaghaaz	Hindi	Yogesh Ishwar	Remake of Sivayya
2001	Preminchu	Telugu	B. Subba Rao	
2001	Dharma Debata	Oriya	Vijay Bhaskar	Remake of Naidu Gari Kutumbam
2001	Maduve Aagona Baa	Kannada	V.S Reddy	Remake of Pelli Chesikundam
2002	Nuvvu Leka Nenu Lenu	Telugu	Kasi Viswanath	
2002	Nee Premakai	Telugu	Muppalaneni Shiva	
2002	Hai	Telugu	E V V Satyanarayana	
2002	Kuch Tum Kaho Kuch Hum Kahein	Hindi	Ravi Sharma Shankar	Remake of Kalisundam Raa
2003	Hari Villu	Telugu	B. Narsing Rao	
2003	Neeku Nenu Naaku Nuvvu	Telugu	Rajasekhar	
2003	Vijayam	Telugu	Singeetam Srinivasa Rao	
2004	Malliswari	Telugu	K. Vijaya Bhaskar	
2005	Nireekshana	Telugu	Sita Ram Parsad	
2005	Soggadu	Telugu	Ravi Babu	
2006	Sri Krishna 2006	Telugu	Vijayendra Prasad	
2006	Ashwaroodan	Malayalam	Jayaraj	
2006	Hamari Beti	Hindi	A.K. Bir	
2007	Madhumasam	Telugu	Chandra Siddhartha	
2007	Tulasi	Telugu	Boyapati Srinu	
2008	Baladur	Telugu	Udayasankar	
2008	Kousalya Supraja Rama	Telugu	Surya Prasad	
2008	Maaziaai	Marathi	Kanchan Nayak	
2009	Bendu Apparao R.M.P	Telugu	E. V. V. Satyanarayana	
2010	Aalasyam Amrutam	Telugu	Chandra Mahesh	
2010	Motabha	Gujarati	Aviraj	
2010	Shiva	Bhojpuri	Gosangi Subba Rao	
2011	Mugguru	Telugu	V. N. Aditya	
2013	Singh vs Kaur	Punjabi	Navaniat Singh	
2013	Nenem…Chinna Pillana?	Telugu	P. Sunil Kumar Reddy	
2013	Masala	Telugu	K. Vijaya Bhaskar	Remake of Bol Bachchan
2014	Bhimavaram Bullodu	Telugu	Udayasankar	
2014	Drushyam	Telugu	Sripriya	Remake of Drishyam; Co-produced with Rajkumar Theatres Pvt Ltd and Wide Angle Creations
2015	Gopala Gopala	Telugu	Kishore Kumar Pardasani	Remake of Oh My God
2015	Avunu 2	Telugu	Ravi Babu	
2017	Nene Raju Nene Mantri	Telugu	Teja	
2018	Ee Nagaraniki Emaindhi	Telugu	Tharun Bhascker	
2019	Oh! Baby	Telugu	B. V. Nandini Reddy	Remake of Miss Granny; Co-produced with People's Media Factory; Guru Films; Kross Pictures
2019	Venky Mama	Telugu	K. S. Ravindra	
2021	Narappa	Telugu	Srikanth Addala	Remake of Asuran; Co-produced with V Creations
2021	Drushyam 2	Telugu	Jeethu Joseph	Remake of Drishyam 2 Co-produced with Aashirvad Cinemas and RajKumar Theatres Pvt. Ltd.
2022	Saakini Daakini	Telugu	Sudheer Varma	Telugu remake of the South Korean film Midnight Runners (2017)
2022	Dongalunnaru Jaagratha	Telugu	Satish Tripura	Co-produced with Guru Films
2022	Prince	Tamil	K. V. Anudeep	Co-produced with Sree Venkateswara Cinemas LLP; Shanthi Talkies
2022	Rajahmundry Rose Milk	Telugu	Naani Bandreddi	Co-produced with Introupe Films
2026	Cheekatilo	Telugu	Sharan Koppisetty	

== Awards ==
Ceremony	Year	Category	Nominee	Result
National Film Awards	1999	Best Feature Film Bengali	Asukh	Won
National Film Awards	1999	Best Feature Film Telugu	Kalisundam Raa	Won
Nandi Awards	1998	Nandi Award for Best Feature Film (Bronze)	Ganesh	Won
Nandi Awards	1999	Nandi Award for Best Feature Film (Gold)	Kalisundam Raa	Won
Nandi Awards	2001	Nandi Award for Best Feature Film (Gold)	Preminchu	Won
Nandi Awards	2003	Best Home-viewing Feature Film	Neeku Nenu Naaku Nuvvu	Won
Nandi Awards	2004	Best Home-viewing Feature Film	Malliswari	Won
Filmfare Awards South	1973	Filmfare Award for Best Film – Telugu	Jeevana Tarangalu	Won
Filmfare Awards South	1976	Filmfare Award for Best Film – Telugu	Soggadu	Won
TSR – TV9 National Film Awards	2015	Best Film	Drushyam	Won
