= Touch Me Not (TV series) =

2025 Indian television series

- Promotional release poster
- Genre: Mystery; Thriller
- Based on: He Is Psychometric by Jin Ah Yang
- Screenplay by: Chaarvi Murari
- Directed by: Ramana Teja
- Starring: Navdeep; Dheekshith Shetty
- Music by: Mahati Swara Sagar
- Country of origin: India
- Original language: Telugu
- No. of episodes: 6

Production
- Producers: Sunitha Tati; Yuvraj Karthikeyan; Vamsi Bandaru; Rohith Pisapati
- Cinematography: Gokul Bharathi
- Editor: Anwar Ali
- Camera setup: Multi-camera
- Running time: 20–37 minutes
- Production company: Guru Films

Original release
- Network: JioHotstar
- Release: 4 April 2025

Touch Me Not is an incomplete Indian Telugu-language mystery thriller television series directed by Ramana Teja and written by Chaarvi Murari with dialogues by Venkatesh Nimmalapudi, based on the tvN series He Is Psychometric. Produced by Sunitha Tati under Guru Films, it stars Navdeep and Dheekshith Shetty. The series premiered on JioHotstar on 4 April 2025.

== Cast ==
- Navdeep as Raghav
- Dheekshith Shetty as Rishi
- Babloo Prithiveeraj
- Komalee Prasad as Meghana
- Sanchitha Poonacha
- Harsha Vardhan

== Production ==
The series was announced on Guru Films. It is the remake of South Korean drama He Is Psychometric (2019). The trailer of the series was released on 19 March 2025.

== Release ==
The series was made available to stream on JioHotstar on 4 April 2025.

== Reception ==
Eenadu critic appreciated the performances while criticizing the execution. Nelki Naresh Kumar from Hindustan Times seem unimpressed with the dialogue.
