= Bobbili Raja =

1990 film by B. Gopal

- Theatrical release poster
- Directed by: B. Gopal
- Written by: Paruchuri Brothers
- Screenplay by: B. Gopal
- Produced by: D. Suresh
- Starring: Venkatesh; Divya Bharati; Vanisri
- Cinematography: K. Ravindra Babu
- Edited by: K. A. Martand
- Music by: Ilaiyaraaja
- Production company: Suresh Productions
- Release date: 14 September 1990
- Running time: 147 minutes
- Country: India
- Language: Telugu

Bobbili Raja ( lit. 'Raja from Bobbili' or 'The King of Bobbili') is a 1990 Indian Telugu-language romantic action film co-written and directed by B. Gopal. Produced by D. Suresh under his banner Suresh Productions, it stars Venkatesh and Divya Bharti (in her Telugu debut) while Vanisri, Kota Srinivasa Rao, Satyanarayana and Sumithra appear in supporting roles. Ilaiyaraaja composed the film's music.

It was dubbed and released by Suresh Productions in Hindi as Rampur Ka Raja in 1993.

== Plot ==
The film begins with election campaigning in the village of Bobbili. Sundarayya and Rajeswari Devi are strong opponents in elections. Rajeswari and her elder brother Ahobala Rao use various tactics to win the elections. Still, their younger brother Suryam supports Sundarayya and also loves his daughter Rajyalakshmi, who becomes pregnant with Suryam's child. Everybody dishonors her, and Ahobala wants to take advantage of the situation in the election campaign. When Suryam decides to reveal the truth to everyone, Ahobala tries to stop him. In that quarrel, Suryam accidentally dies. Ahobala plays a game and blames Sundarayya and Rajyalakshmi for his death. Both are arrested but escape from jail and reach a forest.

After 25 years, Rajyalakshmi's son Raja has always lived in the jungle with his mother and grandfather. Rani is Rajeswari's daughter, and she is the minister of forests who has been brought up amidst wealth. Once, Rani visits the forest along with her friends for a tour. Raja guides them into the forest, and both of them have silly fights with each other along the way. One day, both are lost in the deep forest. After several adventures, they fall for each other.

Meanwhile, Rajeswari reaches the forest in search of Rani. During the search, she finds that Raja is Sundarayya's grandson. She catches Sundarayya and Rajyalakshmi and interrogates them. Rajyalakshmi and Rajeswari challenge each other that she will get her son married to Rani, but Rajeswari says it will never happen. Finally, Rajeswari finds Rani and takes her back. Once Rani learns that Raja is her maternal uncle's son, she escapes from home with her father Appa Rao's help and returns to the forest where Rajeswari follows her. Rajyalakshmi hands Rani over to her mother and tells her son to get Rani back honorably, and he will prove his mother is innocent.

Raja enters into Bobbili after listening to his mother's past and decides to teach Rajeswari a lesson. Raja starts the game with Rajeswari by making a threat to her ministry, but she double-crosses him by arresting Rajyalakshmi in the old murder case. Raja tries for bail, but when the policeman misbehaves with him, Raja fights with them and is arrested. Raja reveals the truth in court, and in his words, the government reacts to Rajyalakshmi and removes her from the ministry. Meanwhile, Ahobala also cheats on Rajeswari and forcefully makes Rani's marriage arrangements with his son Amurtha Rao. The incident opens Rajeswari's eyes, and she apologizes to Raja and Rajyalakshmi. Finally, Ahobala admits his mistake, and Raja and Rani get married.

== Cast ==
The cast is listed below:

- Venkatesh as Raja
- Divya Bharati as Rani
- Gummadi as Sundarayya
- Vanisree as Minister Rajeswari Devi
- Kota Srinivasa Rao as Ahobala Rao
- Satyanarayana as Appa Rao
- Brahmanandam as Forest Officer
- Sumitra as Rajyalakshmi
- Sivaji Raja as Amurtha Rao
- Vidya Sagar as Suryam
- Babu Mohan as Bajanappa
- Pradeep Shakthi as Inspector
- Jaya Prakash Reddy as Tribal
- Bhimeswara Rao as Judge
- Chidatala Appa Rao as Forest Guard
- Heera as Servant Rathalu

== Soundtrack ==
Bobbili Raja

Film score by Ilaiyaraaja
- Released: 1990
- Genre: Soundtrack
- Length: 25:26
- Label: Echo Music
- Producer: Ilaiyaraaja

Ilaiyaraaja chronology
Kondaveeti Donga (1990)	Bobbili Raja (1990)	Jagadeka Veerudu Atiloka Sundari (1990)

Music composed by Ilaiyaraaja. Lyrics are written by Sirivennela Sitarama Sastry. Music released on ECHO Music Company.

No.	Title	Singer(s)	Length
1.	"Ayyo Ayyo"	S. P. Balu, S. Janaki	4:47
2.	"Kanya Kumari"	S. P. Balu, S. Janaki	5:33
3.	"Chemma Chekka"	S. P. Balu, Chitra	5:04
4.	"Odante Vinade"	S. P. Balu, S. Janaki	4:59
5.	"Balapam Patti"	S. P. Balu, Chitra	4:49
Total length:			25:26

== Release ==
The film upon release was a major commercial success, and was declared an 'All Time Blockbuster'. Having a 175-day run in 3 centres, it is considered Venkatesh's first silver-jubilee hit movie. It was later dubbed and released in Tamil as Valiban in June 1992 and in Hindi as Rampur Ka Raja in 1993.

== Awards ==
- Winner of Filmfare Award for Best Music Director – Telugu - Ilaiyaraaja
