= Jung Ye-ji =

South Korean actress

- Born: South Korea
- Other name: Jeong Ye-ji
- Education: Dongguk University (Master's Program in Art Education)
- Occupations: Actress; model
- Years active: 2012–present

Korean name
- Hangul: 정예지
- Hanja: 鄭叡智
- RR: Jeong Yeji
- MR: Chŏng Yeji

Jung Ye-ji (Korean: 정예지) is a South Korean actress and model. She is best known for supporting roles in various dramas. She has appeared in the school series Who Are You: School 2015 as Ye-ji and the movie Midnight Runners with a supporting role as a young police officer Dan-yeong.

== Filmography ==
=== Film ===
Year	Title	Role	Language	Notes	Ref.
2017	Midnight Runners	Dan-yeong, Police Force Student	Korean	Supporting role	
2020	The Swordsman	Lee-sook	Korean	Supporting role	

=== Television ===
Year	Title	Role	Ref.
2012	Still You	Jang Hyun-hee	
2015	Who Are You: School 2015	Ye-ji	
2016	The Good Wife	Seo-ji	
2016	Fantastic	Jo-mi	
2017	Reverse	Ye-ji	
