= Ganesh (1998 film) =

1998 Indian action drama film

- Theatrical release poster
- Directed by: Thirupathisamy
- Written by: Story & Screenplay: Thirupathisamy; Dialogues: Paruchuri Brothers
- Produced by: D.Suresh Babu; D. Rama Naidu (presents)
- Starring: Venkatesh; Rambha; Madhu Bala; Revathi
- Cinematography: K. Ravindra Babu
- Edited by: Marthand K. Venkatesh
- Music by: Mani Sharma
- Production company: Suresh Productions
- Release date: 19 June 1998
- Running time: 166 minutes
- Country: India
- Language: Telugu

Ganesh is a 1998 Indian Telugu-language action-drama film produced by D. Suresh Babu under the Suresh Productions banner, directed by Thirupathisamy. It stars Venkatesh, Rambha and Madhu Bala, with music composed by Mani Sharma.

The film received five Nandi Awards, including the Nandi Award for Best Actor. Venkatesh also won the Filmfare Best Actor Award (Telugu). The film was a blockbuster at the box office.

== Plot ==
Ganesh is a journalist whose family and life are affected by corrupt politicians. He is planning how to take revenge and change the system.

== Cast ==
- Venkatesh as Ganesh
- Rambha as Priya (Voice dubbed by Roja Ramani)
- Madhu Bala as Divya (Voice dubbed by Saritha)
- Revathi as Ganesh young age mother(Guest appearance)
- Keerthana as Ganga, Ganesh's sister (Voice dubbed by Shilpa)
- D. Ramanaidu as Justice D. R. Naidu
- Kota Srinivasa Rao as Health Minister Samba Sivudu
- Chandra Mohan as Rama Chandrayah
- Jaya Prakash Reddy as DIG
- Ahuti Prasad as Dean Prasad
- Chalapathi Rao as Dr. Raj Gopal
- Padmanabham as Prisoner
- Brahmanandam as Sub-Jailor Kondal Rao
- Ali as Health Minister's PA
- Babu Mohan as Prisoner
- Venu Madhav as Prisoner
- Gundu Hanumantha Rao as Prisoner
- K. Ashok Kumar as Health Minister's Henchmen
- Banerjee as Health Secretary Banerjee
- Raghunatha Reddy as Doctor
- Jeeva as Veeraju
- Narsing Yadav as Prisoner
- Ree Sidhardha as Mastan
- Bandla Ganesh as Prisoner
- Prudhviraj as Dr. Anand
- Ashok Kumar as Private Secretary Ashok
- Subbaraya Sharma as Doctor
- P. L. Narayana as Ward Boy
- Rajababu as Marvadi
- Narayana Rao as Health Secretary Guru Murthy
- Eeswar Rao as Rangamma's husband
- C. V. L. Narasimha Rao as Subba Rao
- Narasimha Raju as Doctor
- Gokina Rama Rao as Superintendent
- Saradhi as R.M.O
- Mada as Doctor
- Gadiraju Subba Rao as Prison
- Rama Prabha as Priya's paternal grandmother
- Telangana Shakuntala
- Sana as Priya's sister
- Ragini
- Karmendar Kaur as item number
- Pinky as Namartha
- Master Harsha Vardhan
- Master Vamsi

== Soundtrack ==
Ganesh

Soundtrack album by Mani Sharma
- Released: 1998
- Recorded: 1998
- Genre: Soundtrack
- Length: 24:10
- Label: Aditya Music
- Producer: Mani Sharma

Mani Sharma chronology
Bavagaru Bagunnara? (1998)	Ganesh (1998)	Choodalani Vundi (1998)

Music composed by Mani Sharma. Music released on ADITYA Music Company.

Track-List
No.	Title	Lyrics	Singer(s)	Length
1.	"Aadabarse"	Bhuvanachandra	Mano	5:19
2.	"Hindilona Chumma"	Chandrabose	Sujatha Mohan, Mano	4:21
3.	"Raja Hamsavo"	Veturi	Sujatha Mohan, Hariharan	4:49
4.	"Siri Siri Muvvalu"	Sirivennela	S. P. Balasubrahmanyam	4:22
5.	"Ayorama"	Chandrabose	Udit Narayan	5:16
Total length:				24:10

== Reception ==
Andhra Today wrote "The message-oriented movie, instead of making a loud and clear appeal that right to life is same to all and medical practitioners and others should be humane and considerate, stoops to the commercial level like any other run- of- the-mill movie". Screen wrote "This is a Venkatesh film all the way, and he carries the film on his shoulders with a splendid performance as an upright journalist who takes on an evil health minister".

== Awards ==
Nandi Awards - 1998

- Third Best Feature Film - Bronze - D. Suresh Babu
- Best Actor - Venkatesh
- Best Villain - Kota Srinivasa Rao
- Best Dialogue Writer - Paruchuri Brothers
- Best Makeup Artist - Raghava

Filmfare Awards South

- Best Actor – Telugu - Venkatesh - won
