= Bangaru Kodipetta =

- Bangaru_Kodipetta First Look
- Directed by: Raj Pippalla
- Story by: Raj Pippalla
- Produced by: Sunitha Tati
- Starring: Navdeep; Swathi Reddy
- Cinematography: Sahir Raza
- Edited by: Chandrasekhar GV
- Music by: Mahesh Shankar
- Production company: Guru Films
- Release date: 7 March 2014
- Country: India
- Language: Telugu

Bangaru Kodipetta (transl. Golden Hen) is a 2014 Telugu language romantic comedy film directed by Raj Pippalla and produced by Sunitha Tati under Guru Films and starring Navdeep and Swathi Reddy. The title of this film is based on a song from Gharana Mogudu (1992).

== Cast ==
- Navdeep as Vamsi
- Swathi Reddy as Bhanumati Pinisetti
- Harsha Vardhan
- Santosh Sobhan as Venu
- Ram as Yerra Babu
- Laxman as Dora Babu
- Sanchalana as Sruthi

== Production ==
Navdeep and Swati are main lead in this film with popular action choreographers Ram - Laxman in vital roles. The first look of the film was revealed on 24 July 2012. On 13 November 2012 sources reported that the shooting of the film was completed.

== Soundtrack ==
The movie's audio was released by Samantha on 3 July 2013. The soundtrack of Bangaru Kodipetta was composed by Mahesh Shankar.

Bangaru Kodipetta

Soundtrack album by Mahesh Shankar
- Released: 2013
- Recorded: 3 July 2013
- Genre: Soundtrack
- Label: Aditya Music
- Producer: Mahesh Shankar

Mahesh Shankar chronology
Poga (2012)	Bangaru Kodipetta (2013)	D for Dopidi (2013)

Track list
No.	Title	Singers	Length
1.	"Bulli Bulli Pitta"	Rita Thyagarajan, Suchith Suresan
2.	"Yemo Nemo"	Suchith Suresan
3.	"Allo Nerello"	Amruthavarshini
4.	"Thadhasthu"	Mahesh Shankar and Megha Girish
5.	"O Lachcha"	Usha Uthup
6.	"BKP Mashup Gogulu Pooche"	Usha Uthup, Amruthavarshini, Mahesh Shankar, Megha Girish, Rita Thyagarajan, Suchith Suresan

== Release ==
The film was given U/A Certificate by CBFC in India. The film's makers announced that its release date of 27 February 2014 was postponed to 7 March. Later it was dubbed into Tamil titled as Love Pannunga Life Nalla Irukkum.

== Awards and nominations ==
Year	Ceremony	Category	Nominee	Result
2015	4th South Indian International Movie Awards	Best Debutant Producer	Sunitha Tati	Nominated
