= Juliet Lover of Idiot =

2017 Telugu mystery film by Ajay Vodhirala

- Theatrical release poster
- Directed by: Ajay Vodhirala
- Produced by: Kothapalli R Raghu Babu; KB Chowdary
- Starring: Naveen Chandra; Nivetha Thomas
- Cinematography: Arthur A. Wilson
- Edited by: S. B. Uddhav
- Music by: Ratheesh Vega
- Production company: Anurag Productions
- Release date: 15 December 2017
- Country: India
- Language: Telugu

Juliet Lover of Idiot is a 2017 Telugu romantic comedy mystery film directed by Ajay Vodhirala, starring Naveen Chandra and Niveda Thomas in the lead roles. It is produced by Kothapalli R Raghu Babu and Kannika under Anurag Productions. Music is scored by Ratheesh Vega.

== Cast ==
- Naveen Chandra as Vara
- Nivetha Thomas as Julie
- Abhimanyu Singh as Khan
- Ali as Gun Laden
- Rohini as Vara's mother
- Nizhagal Ravi as Vara's father
- Supreeth as a customer at Vara's bar
- Thagubothu Ramesh as Moneylender
- Fish Venkat
- Ester Noronha as Herself, Special appearance in "I don't know "song

== Music ==
The songs and background music was scored by Ratheesh Vega under Mango Music. The audio was released on 29 October 2017.

No.	Title	Lyrics	Singer(s)	Length
1.	"Ila Chudara Nanna"	Ramajogayya Sastry, Anantha Sriram	Supriya Lohith	4:34
2.	"Naalo Ninnu Nenu"	Anantha Sriram	Najim Arshad
3.	"I Don't Know"	Karunakar	Sayanora Philip
4.	"Neekai Vechey"	Karunakar	Anitha Karthikeyan	3:28
5.	"Eiffel Tower Pai Salsaale"	Ramajogayya Sastry	Yazin Nizar
6.	"Adugulu Vethike"	Sarwa Rao	Rahul Nambiar
Total length:				23:53

== Reception ==
A critic from The Times of India gave the film a rating of one-and-a-half out of five stars and noted that "Despite having a stupendous cast, ‘Juliet Lover of Idiot’ seems to have missed the mark". A critic from The Hindu opined that the film was "inconsistent and incoherent".
