= Coolie No. 1 (1991 film) =

1991 Indian film by K. Raghavendra Rao

Coolie No.1
- Poster
- Directed by: K. Raghavendra Rao
- Written by: Paruchuri Brothers
- Screenplay by: K. Raghavendra Rao
- Produced by: D. Suresh Babu
- Starring: Venkatesh; Tabu
- Cinematography: S. Gopal Reddy
- Edited by: K. A. Martand
- Music by: Ilaiyaraaja
- Production company: Suresh Productions
- Release date: 12 July 1991
- Running time: 148 mins
- Country: India
- Language: Telugu

Coolie No. 1 is a 1991 Indian Telugu-language romantic action film produced by D. Suresh Babu under the Suresh Productions banner and directed by K. Raghavendra Rao. It starred Venkatesh and Tabu, the latter making her first movie as an actress. Rao Gopal Rao, Sharada, Kota Srinivasa Rao, Paruchuri Venkateswara Rao, Mohan Babu, and Brahmanandam play supporting roles. The music was composed by Ilaiyaraaja with cinematography by S. Gopal Reddy and editing by K. A. Martand. The film was dubbed into Tamil under the same title and in Hindi as Coolie Raja.

== Plot ==
Ranjani is the arrogant daughter of Koteswara Rao, a multimillionaire in Singapore. While travelling to Hyderabad on the train, she stops the train for her fallen lipstick, which leads to the death of Parvathamma. Raju is the Coolie at Secunderabad Railway Station. He and Ranjani always clash with each other. Rajani calls her father from Singapore, and both of them implicate Raju in a rape case and send him to jail.

However, Raju is successful in escaping from jail. Due to Raju's threat, Koteswara Rao and Ranjani return to Singapore. Raju also arrives there with the help of Ranjani's mother Gruhalakshmi. Raju changes himself as Bharat and showcases himself as a big shot before Ranjani and makes her fall in love with him. Everyone agrees to their wedding, but Buchi Babu, Koteswara Rao's business partner, and his son Gopal (Mohan Babu), who wants to marry Ranjani, find out that Bharat is none other than Raju. After the wedding, Raju reveals the truth. Everyone is shocked, and the stunned Ranjani throws away the holy Mangala sutra from her neck.

Everyone goes back to India, where Raju arranges their wedding reception. To rid his daughter of Raju, Koteswara Rao contacts local goon named Ranga Rao to stop the reception. He creates a big communal riot in Raju's colony, which leads to the deaths of many innocent people. In frustration and anger, Raju makes Ranjani pregnant after sedating her with her mother's help. She makes all possible attempts to terminate her pregnancy but fails. Finally, she decides to throw away the baby after giving birth.

Meanwhile, Ranga Rao, Buchi Babu, and Gopal try to kill Koteswara Rao for his property, but Raju protects him, which makes him realise his misdeeds. Ranjani gives birth to the baby boy, and abandons the newborn. Raju decides to leave her, and takes his son with him. In anger, Gruhalakshmi reveals that Ranjani is not their own daughter, but the daughter of a railway coolie, and Parvathamma who died due to her negligence was her own mother. Ranjani admits her mistake just as Ranga Rao, Buchi Babu, and Gopal all beat Raju very badly, kidnap the baby, and blackmail Ranjani for her entire property. Ranjani runs towards Raju and apologises to him by falling at his feet. Finally, Raju protects the baby and eliminates all the baddies. The movie ends with Raju and Ranjani's remarriage.

== Cast ==
- Venkatesh as Raju / Bharat
- Tabu as Ranjani
- Rao Gopal Rao as Koteswara Rao
- Sarada as Gruhalakshmi
- Kota Srinivasa Rao as Ranga Rao
- Paruchuri Venkateswara Rao as Buchi Babu
- Mohan Babu as Gopal
- Brahmanandam as Nagoji
- Babu Mohan as S. I.
- Dubbing Janaki as Parvathamma
- Nirmalamma as Sarojamma
- Rallapalli as Lawyer Sripathi
- Gautam Raju as Coolie
- Jenny as Passenger
- Bangalore Padma as Coolie
- Rajitha as Lalitha
- Mada as T. C. (Ticket Collector)
- Telangana Shakuntala as Doctor (Uncredited Role)

== Soundtrack ==
Music was composed by Ilaiyaraaja and lyrics written by Sirivennela Seetharama Sastry. Music released on LEO Audio company. The song "Kotha Kothaga" is based on "Pudhiya Poovithu", composed by Ilaiyaraaja for the Tamil film Thendrale Ennai Thodu (1985). The single "Attention Everybody" is reprised by Raja Kumari, in a tribute to Venkatesh by actor Rana Daggubati's South Bay channel in 2020. The songs particularly "Dandalayya" and "Kalaya Nijama" became popular. The first song is regularly played during Ganesh Chaturthi.

Track list
No.	Title	Singer(s)	Length
1.	"Kotha Kothaga"	S. P. Balasubrahmanyam, K. S. Chithra	4:38
2.	"Kila Kila"	S. P. Balasubrahmanyam, K. S. Chithra	4:44
3.	"Abbani Yentha Dabbani"	S. P. Balasubrahmanyam, Ilaiyaraaja	4:07
4.	"Attention Everybody"	S. P. Balasubrahmanyam	4:46
5.	"Kalaya Nijama"	Ilaiyaraaja, P. Susheela	4:57
6.	"Dandalaya"	S. P. Balasubrahmanyam	4:59
Total length:			28:11
