= Nuvvu Leka Nenu Lenu =

- DVD cover
- Directed by: Y. Kasi Viswanath
- Written by: Y. Kasi Viswanath
- Produced by: Daggubati Suresh Babu
- Starring: Tarun; Aarthi Agarwal; Laya; Sarath Babu; Chandra Mohan
- Cinematography: Sekhar V. Joseph
- Edited by: Marthand K. Venkatesh; Madhav
- Music by: R. P. Patnaik
- Production company: Suresh Productions
- Release date: 14 January 2002
- Running time: 150 minutes
- Country: India
- Language: Telugu
- Box office: ₹15 crore distributors' share

Nuvvu Leka Nenu Lenu (English: Without You, I Am Not There) is a 2002 Indian Telugu-language romantic comedy film, starring Tarun, Aarti Agarwal, Laya, Sarath Babu, Chandra Mohan, and Radha Kumari. This film was released on 14 January 2002 with positive reviews and became a blockbuster.

== Plot ==
Radha Krishna (Tarun) and Krishna Veni (Aarthi Agarwal) grow up together as childhood friends. Their parents are close companions and business partners. Over time, their childhood bond deepens into love.

When their parents' business faces challenges, a kind-hearted elder (K. Viswanath) steps in to offer help. In return, he requests that Krishna Veni marry his grandson. To honor the elder's support, Radha Krishna decides to sacrifice his love. Krishna Veni, though unwilling, reluctantly agrees to the arrangement. Meanwhile, Radha Krishna gets engaged to another girl, and jealousy creeps over Krishna Veni, who is once again reminded that her marriage is happening against her will. Nevertheless, she tries to get closer to Radha Krishna, but fails, when she finds out that he has no problem that he is engaged to someone else. Heartbroken, she gives up and goes away.

In the end, however, the elders recognize the depth of the couple's love and their selflessness, bringing the two lovers together for a joyful and heartwarming conclusion.

== Cast ==
- Tarun as Radha Krishna
- Aarthi Agarwal as Krishna Veni (Voice Dubbed by Savitha Reddy)
- Laya as Neerja (Voice Dubbed by Shilpa)
- Kiran Rathod as Anjali (Voice Dubbed by Sunitha)
- Brahmanandam as Shastri
- Sunil as Karri Seenu
- Paruchuri Venkateswara Rao as Kodi Peddaiah, Neerja's grandfather
- Chandra Mohan as Siva Prasad, Krishna's father
- Sarath Babu as Panduranga Rao, Radha's father
- Radha Kumari as Radha's grandmother
- Ahuti Prasad as Ram Mohan, Neerja's uncle
- K. Viswanath as Ramachandraiah
- MS Narayana as Doctor
- Gundu Hanumantha Rao as Hanumantha Shastri
- Pragathi as Lalita, Krishna's mother
- Ragini as Suguna, Neerja's mother
- Sudha as Janaki, Radha's mother
- Chittajalu Lakshmipati as Lakshmipati
- Raghunatha Reddy
- Subbaraya Sharma as Manager Murthy
- Kadambari Kiran as Bus conductor
- Chitram Srinu as Guava seller

== Soundtrack ==
All music is composed by R. P. Patnaik

No.	Title	Lyrics	Singer(s)	Length
1.	"Edo Edo"	Y. Kasi Viswanath	Usha
2.	"Ela Ela"	Chandrabose	Usha
3.	"Nindu Godari Kada"	Kulasekhar	R. P. Patnaik, Kousalya
4.	"Nuvvante Naakistam"	Veturi	R. P. Patnaik
5.	"Chinni Chinni"	Veturi	S. P. Balasubrahmanyam
6.	"Chi Chi Chi"	Veturi	R. P. Patnaik, Lenina, Usha

== Reception ==
A critic from Idlebrain.com wrote that "This is a feel-good and pleasant film with a story that is time tested and in tune with the current trend of youth films". A critic from Sify wrote that "To sum it up NLNL is a weak and undernourished love story". A critic from The Hindu wrote that "An interesting and pleasant love story, handled well by debutant director Y. Kasi Viswanath. It is a carefully crafted film, keeping in view the present craze for youth-oriented subjects". Telugu Cinema wrote "Despite being the fact that the film is a retelling of some recent hits, the film succeeds in entertaining audience. The first time director played it safe this way".
