= Guru Films =

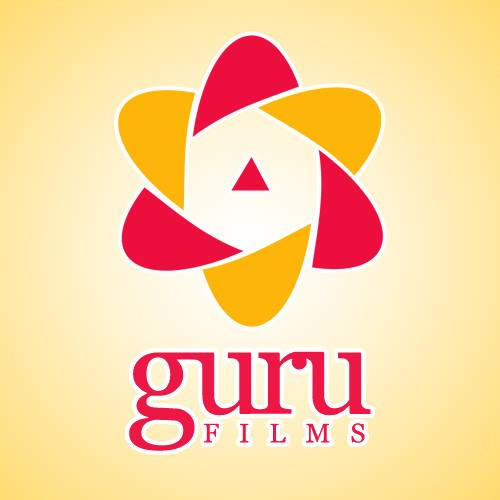
- Company type: Private
- Industry: Entertainment
- Headquarters: Hyderabad, Telangana, India
- Products: Films
- Owner: Sunitha Tati
- Website: Guru Films

Guru Films is a media company in film and television production, animation, publishing and digital media. The company is based out of Hyderabad.

In 2009-2010, Guru Films line produced for a Mumbai production house and the Hindi film, ‘Shor In The City’.

Apart from movies in Hindi, Telugu and Tamil, the production house has also produced TV shows for Zee Telugu and Star Maa channels.

In 2019, Guru Films along with Suresh Productions, Kross Pictures, and People's Media Factory produced Oh! Baby, starring Samantha Akkineni in the title role.

Collaborating again with Suresh Productions and Kross Pictures, in 2021, Guru Films released the Telugu remake of Midnight Runners titled Saakini Daakini with Regina Cassandra and Nivetha Thomas in the title roles in this action-comedy and Dongalunnaru Jaagratha, a survival crime thriller starring Simha Koduri, and Samuthirakani.

In 2022, Guru Films is working on an international project Chennai Story with director Philip John and the project so far has tied up ‘Blinded By The Light’ Star Viveik Kalra

== Film production ==
| Year | Film | Language | Actors | Director | Notes |
|---|---|---|---|---|---|
| 2014 | Bangaru Kodipetta | Telugu | Navdeep, Swathi Reddy | Raj Pippalla | |
| 2015 | Tamilselvanum Thaniyar Anjalum | Tamil | Jai, Yami Gautam | Premsai | |
| 2015 | Courier Boy Kalyan | Telugu | Nithiin, Yami Gautam | Premsai | |
| 2016 | Sahasam Swasaga Sagipo | Telugu | Akkineni Naga Chaitanya, Manjima Mohan | Gautham Vasudev Menon | |
| 2016 | Achcham Yenbadhu Madamaiyada | Tamil | Simbu, Manjima Mohan | Gautham Vasudev Menon | |
| 2019 | Oh! Baby | Telugu | Samantha Akkineni, Naga Shaurya | B. V. Nandini Reddy | |
| 2022 | Saakini Daakini | Telugu | Regina Cassandra, Nivetha Thomas | Sudheer Varma | |
| 2022 | Dongalunnaru Jaagratha | Telugu | Sri Simha | Satish Tripura | |
| 2023 | Chennai Story | English, Tamil | Viveik Kalra, Nimmi Harasgama | Philip John | |

== Television production ==
| Title | Network | Notes |
|---|---|---|
| America Ammayi | Zee Telugu | Completed |
| Ok Jaanu | Star Maa | Completed |
| Social | Viu | First bilingual digital series |
| Touch Me Not | JioHotstar | |
