= Neeku Nenu Naaku Nuvvu =

- DVD cover
- Directed by: Raja Sekhar
- Written by: Paruchuri Brothers
- Produced by: D. Suresh Babu
- Starring: Krishnam Raju; Uday Kiran; Shriya Saran
- Cinematography: N.K. Ekambaram
- Edited by: Marthand K. Venkatesh
- Music by: R. P. Patnaik
- Production company: Suresh Productions
- Release date: 15 August 2003
- Country: India
- Language: Telugu

Neeku Nenu Naaku Nuvvu (transl. Me for you and you for me) is a 2003 Indian Telugu-language romantic comedy film starring Krishnam Raju, Uday Kiran and Shriya Saran, directed by Raja Sekhar. It is produced by D. Suresh Babu on Suresh Productions banner.

== Plot ==
Raghavayya, a rich industrialist has a daughter (Meena Kumari). Raghavayya helps Prasad who was the son of Raghavayya's deceased employee by funding his studies. Prasad falls in love with Raghavayya's daughter and elopes with her to London and settles there. They have a daughter called Seetu alias Seeta Lakshmi.

Raghavayya adopts a boy from an orphanage and names him Anand. Raghavayya has excessive hatred towards love marriages because of his daughter's elopement. In the meantime, Raghavayya's daughter dies due to illness. After a few years, Prasad and Seetu return to Hyderabad where she meets Anand who is very loyal to his adopted father. Seetu and Anand fall in love.

What happens when Raghavayya learns that his loyal and truthful son is in love with the daughter of those who hurt him forms the crux of the story.

== Cast ==
- Uday Kiran as Anand
- Shriya Saran as Seeta Lakshmi / Seetu
- Suman as Prasad
- Krishnam Raju as Raghavayya
- Meena Kumari as Raghavayya's daughter
- Sujatha as Raghavayya's wife
- Paruchuri Venkateswara Rao as Venkatachalam, Raghavayya's friend
- Chandra Mohan as Chandram
- Brahmanandam as Pandit
- Ravi Babu as College student
- Krishna Mohan
- Kakarala
- Jyoti as Thief

== Music ==
The music was composed by R. P. Patnaik and released under the Aditya Music label.

No.	Title	Singer(s)	Length
1.	"Naa Chirunamaa"	Rajesh Krishnan, K. S. Chithra
2.	"Premakanna Goppadinka"	Shankar Mahadevan, K. S. Chithra
3.	"Gummaare Gummaare"	KK, Usha
4.	"Telugu Bhasha"	S. P. B. Charan
5.	"Pellade Teeralannaru"	S. P. Balasubrahmanyam, K. S. Chithra
6.	"Nenu Neekevarani"	Karthik, Usha
7.	"Goal Goal"	Uday Kiran, Usha

== Reception ==
Jeevi of Idlebrain.com wrote that "The touch of D Suresh Babu is missing in the taking of this film. However, he should be commended for making a clean film". A critic from The Hindu called the film "A moving high-voltage, sentimental drama that caters to family audiences in general". A critic from Sify wrote that "To sum it up NLNL is a weak and undernourished love story".

== Awards ==
51st Filmfare Awards South

- Best Supporting Actor – Krishnam Raju – Nominated

Nandi Awards

- Akkineni Award for Best Home-viewing Feature Film – D. Suresh Babu
