= Nandi Award for Akkineni Award for Best Home-viewing Feature Film =

Indian film award

The Akkineni Award for Best Home-Viewing Feature Film was commissioned in 1991. This is a list of the films that have won the award over the years.

== Winners list ==
Year	Film	Producer
2016	Sathamanam Bhavati	Dil Raju
2015	Malli Malli Idi Rani Roju	K. A. Vallabha
2014	Tommy	Chegondi Hari Rama Jogaiah
2013	Seethamma Vakitlo Sirimalle Chettu	Dil Raju
2012	Ishq	N. Sudhakar Reddy
2011	100% Love	Bunny Vasu
2010	Andari Bandhuvaya	Chandra Siddhartha
2009	Konchem Ishtam Konchem Kashtam	Nallamalupu Bujji
2008	Ashta Chamma	Ram Mohan
2007	Chandamama	C. Kalyan
2006	Sri Ramadasu	Konda Krishnam Raju
2005	Nuvvostanante Nenoddantana	M. S. Raju
2004	Malliswari	Daggubati Suresh Babu
2003	Neeku Nenu Naaku Nuvvu	Daggubati Suresh Babu
2002	Vasu	K. S. Rama Rao
2001	Nuvvu Naaku Nachav	Sravanthi Ravi Kishore
2000	Sakutumba Saparivaara Sametam	M. Mohana Gandhi
1999	Rajakumarudu	C. Aswini Dutt
1998	Subbaraju Gari Kutumbam	K. C. Sekhar Babu
1997	Maa Nannaku Pelli	Arjuna Raju,
1996	Ninne Pelladata	Nagarjuna
1995	Pelli Sandadi	Allu Aravind
1994	Madam	M. Chittibabu; Ramprasad
1993	Mayalodu	K. Atchi Reddy
1992	Dabbu Bhale Jabbu	Allu Ramalingaiah
1991	Swathi Kiranam	V. Madhusudhana Rao
