= Saakini Daakini =

- Theatrical release poster
- Directed by: Sudheer Varma
- Screenplay by: Akshay Poolla
- Based on: Midnight Runners by Joo-Hwan Kim
- Produced by: D. Suresh Babu; Sunitha Tati
- Starring: Regena Cassandrra; Nivetha Thomas
- Cinematography: Richard Prasad
- Edited by: Viplav Nyshadam
- Music by: Mikey McCleary
- Production companies: Suresh Productions; Guru Films; Kross Pictures
- Release date: 16 September 2022
- Running time: 118 minutes
- Country: India
- Language: Telugu

Saakini Daakini is a 2022 Indian Telugu-language action comedy film directed by Sudheer Varma and produced by Suresh Productions, Guru Films, and Kross Pictures. An official remake of the 2017 South Korean film Midnight Runners, it stars Regena Cassandrra and Nivetha Thomas. The film has music composed by Mikey McCleary.

Principal photography took place from March 2021 to August 2021, entirely in Hyderabad. Saakini Daakini was released theatrically on 16 September 2022.

== Plot ==
Shalini and Damini, two police trainees for Sub-Inspector posts after passing Telangana State Level Public Recruitment Board from differing backgrounds, become fierce rivals after their induction into the academy and their placement in the same room. Their conflict eventually escalates into a full-blown brawl that nearly leads to their suspension. However, after Shalini helps an injured Damini during a forest run challenge when no one else does, their conduct is commended and they become best friends.

One day, they witness a kidnapping of a girl on their way back from the club at midnight. The local police station's missing persons department, however, is busy with the kidnapping of a son of a businessman at the time and is unable to investigate the case. Knowing that they are in the critical hours after a kidnapping, they embark on their amateur investigation.

When Shalini and Damini catch up with the kidnappers, it appears that the gang is running an unfertilized egg harvesting ring and there are many more girls locked up at their hideout. Shalini and Damini tries to save them but are instead beaten and locked up. After escaping their captors, they return the next day to an empty hideout and a cold trail. As they are not acting police officers, their professor tells them not to pursue the case any further. Unable to wait for the bureaucracy to resolve the case, they once again embark on their own investigation.

They undergo heavy physical training and manage to track the kidnappers down, with the help of CCTV footage, to a fertility clinic. Armored up with weapons, the duo venture in to liberate the girls by themselves, this time much more prepared. They successfully take down all the kidnappers and their boss and save all girls. However, due to some among the disciplinary committee believing that they had done the right thing morally, they are instead held back a year in their studies and start training from beginning.

== Cast ==
- Nivetha Thomas as SI Shalini,"Saakini" Police Trainee
- Regena Cassandrra as SI Damini,"Daakini" Police Trainee
- Bhanu Chander as Pratap IPS, Police Academy head
- Prudhvi Raj as CI Raghu, Police Academy Instructor
- Raghu Babu as SIBrahma Rao, Control room incharge
- Kabir Duhan Singh as Human Trafficking Head
- Amit Tiwari as Rafiq
- Chammak Chandra as Police Academy trainer
- Ravi Varma as Fertility Doctor
- Bhadram as Govindam
- Auto Ramprasad as Chutney Chandu
- Lahari Shari as Weapons Incharge
- Sudharshan as SI Sudharshan, colleague of Shalini, who has Kleptomania disorder.
- RJ Hemanth as Flirt
- Ram Prasad as Tiffin Centre Man

== Production ==
In January 2020, producer Suresh Babu acquired the remake rights of the South Korean film Midnight Runners in a collaboration with the Seoul-based Kross Pictures. Director Sudheer Varma was signed to helm the remake in the same month. Actress Regina Cassandra and Nivetha Thomas were signed to play lead roles in August 2020. The film has music composed by Mikey McCleary.

The film commenced its principal photography in March 2021 but was halted due to the COVID-19 pandemic. Final schedule resumed in July that year with shoot wrapping up in August 2021. The film's title was confirmed as Saakini Daakini in November 2021.

The film is Varma's first remake as a director. While the original film featured two male protagonists, Varma swapped their genders to females and tweak the script accordingly. The film was shot entirely in Hyderabad.

== Release ==
=== Theatrical ===
Saakini Daakini was released theatrically on 16 September 2022.

=== Home media ===
Earlier in December 2021, the makers contemplated a direct-to-streaming release on Netflix due to the pandemic. The movie was made available to stream on Netflix from September 30, 2022, in Telugu, Tamil and Malayalam.

== Reception ==
Balakrishna Ganeshan of The News Minute rated the film 2.5 out of 5 stars and wrote, "It feels like there is no progress in the story and that the plot is moving in the same circle. The comedy in scenes involving Prithviraj and others in the first half, which keeps the film light-hearted, completely misses its mark in the second half". The Times of India rated the film 2.5 out of 5 stars, stating, "Despite its entertaining first half, the film ends up over ambitious in the second half crumbling under its own weight. But this show of girl power by Regina and Nivetha is a welcome change". Sakshi Post rated the film 2 out of 5 stars and commented, "Watch Saakini Daakini at your own risk. If you love Korean movies, check out the original version instead!". Sangeetha Devi Dundoo of The Hindu stated, "Nivetha Thomas and Regina Cassandra make this action entertainer about two girls who punch above their weight, a fun watch."
