= Dongalunnaru Jaagratha =

- Theatrical release poster
- Directed by: Sathish Tripura
- Based on: 4x4 by Mariano Cohn; Gastón Duprat
- Produced by: D. Suresh Babu; Sunitha Tati
- Starring: Simha Koduri; Samuthirakani; Preethi Asrani
- Cinematography: Yeshwanth C.
- Edited by: Garry BH
- Music by: Kaala Bhairava
- Production companies: Suresh Productions; Guru Films
- Release date: 23 September 2022
- Country: India
- Language: Telugu

Dongalunnaru Jaagratha (transl. Beware of Thieves) is a 2022 Indian Telugu-language survival crime thriller film directed by Sathish Tripura and, produced by Suresh Productions and Guru Films. It features Simha Koduri, Samuthirakani and Preethi Asrani in primary roles. It is a remake of the Argentine film 4x4 (2019).

== Plot ==
Raju is a small time thief who hides his identity from his wife, Neeraja. One day, he goes to a car theft and gets stuck in the car. He tries all ways to get out of the car but fails. How will he get out of the car? Who trapped him in the car? What is his motive? These questions form the plot.

== Cast ==
- Simha Koduri as Raju
- Samuthirakani as Chakravarthi (voice dubbed by Subhalekha Sudhakar)
- Preethi Asrani as Neeraja
- Srikanth Iyengar as cop

== Reception ==
A critic from The Times of India wrote that "Dongalunnaru Jagratha is an interesting attempt in the genre of survival mystery" and added that the film was "thought-provoking".
