= Jayam Manadera =

- Theatrical release poster
- Directed by: N. Shankar
- Screenplay by: Paruchuri Brothers
- Story by: N. Shankar
- Produced by: D. Suresh Babu
- Starring: Venkatesh; Soundarya; Bhanupriya
- Cinematography: K. Ravindra Babu
- Edited by: Marthand K. Venkatesh; K. Madhav
- Music by: Vandemataram Srinivas
- Production company: Suresh Productions
- Release date: 7 October 2000
- Running time: 152 minutes
- Country: India
- Language: Telugu

Jayam Manadera (transl. Victory is Ours) is a 2000 Indian Telugu-language action drama film directed by N. Shankar and produced by D. Suresh Babu under the Suresh Productions banner. It stars Venkatesh, Bhanupriya and Soundarya, with music composed by Vandemataram Srinivas. The film was successful at the box office. The film won two Nandi Awards and one Filmfare Award. The film was also remade in Tamil as Manikanda and in Bengali Bangladesh as Dhongsho.

== Plot ==
Abhiram is a fun-loving man who stays with his parents in London. Eight people win the Thums Up contest which gives them an opportunity to tour Europe. Uma is one of the contest winners. Abhiram likes Uma and acts as their tour companion during their stay in Europe. A shy Uma could not express her love towards him, so she leaves a message in his answering machine. But Abhiram could not listen to the message at the right time. Hence, Uma presumes that Abhiram does not love her and returns to India with her companions. But Abhiram hears the message after Uma left, and calls her. But it's too late for him, as Uma's father arranges his daughter's marriage with Jasjit, the brother of the main villain.

Meanwhile, Jasjit and his gang of goons are searching for a persona named Mahadeva Naidu. When Subramanyam's father sees the photograph of Abhiram, he feels frightened and approaches Narasimha Naidu. Narasimha wants to eliminate Mahadeva Naidu. When Abhiram discovers that Uma may be forcibly married to another man, he goes to her village to elope with her. Just when he reaches the railway station, a gang that is after his life chases him and Uma, but the couple evade the goons and flee. They are saved by Bhavani (Jhansi) in the nick of time. She takes him to a hideout where a group of people are hiding.

They explain to him about his past. He is the son of Mahadeva Naidu (also Venkatesh), who was the savior of the Dalits and downtrodden people of Karamchedu. He liberated the Dalits in that area and he was killed by the villains, who are none other than his relatives. Rudrama Naidu (son) and Jhansi (daughter) are taken away by Mahadeva Naidu's lieutenants so that they can be saved. Mahadeva Naidu swears that his son Rudrama Naidu would come back to destroy the villains and save the poor people. Rudrama Naidu, who was raised as Abhiraam, learns about his past and the rest of the film is about his revenge.

== Cast ==
- Venkatesh in a dual role as
  - Mahadeva Naidu (father)
  - Rudrama Naidu aka Abhiram (son)
- Soundarya as Uma
- Bhanupriya as Bhuvaneswari
- Jaya Prakash Reddy as Narasimha Naidu
- Atul Kulkarni as Basavayah
- Jhansi as Bhavani
- Brahmanandam as Krupakaram
- Ali as Latif
- Tanikella Bharani as Mallesh Yadav
- M. S. Narayana as Lingam
- AVS as Sonthi Paramahamsa
- L. B. Sriram as Mattaiah
- Ahuti Prasad as Gangadharam Naidu
- Prasad Babu as Subramanyam
- Meena Kumari as Maheswari
- Kolla Ashok Kumar as Vyakuntha Naidu
- Banerjee as Kesava Naidu
- Ravi Babu as Ravindra Naidu
- Surya as Purushothama Naidu
- Raja Ravindra as Damodara Naidu
- Ashok Kumar as Priest
- Rama Prabha as Uma's Bamma
- Venniradai Nirmala as Parvathi
- Hema as Chandramma
- Priya as Uma's friend
- Narsingh Yadav as Police Officer
- Siva Parvathi as Narasimha Naidu's mother
- Indu Anand as Narasima Naidu's wife
- Ramyasri as Kesava Naidu's wife
- Gadiraju Subba Rao as Villager
- Satya Prakash as Janardhan Naidu
- Navabharat Balaji as Suridu
- Harika as Rangamma
- Bangalore Padma
- Sumalata
- Shobha
- Sunitha
- Srija
- Sweety

== Production ==
The film began production under the name Rudrama Naidu. The film was shot in Europe for 25 days while two songs were shot in United States and the filming was also held at Vedavati river of Anantapur and Godavari. Soft drink company Thumbs Up served as the film's brand ambassador.

== Soundtrack ==
Jayam Manadera

Film score by Vandemataram Srinivas
- Released: 2000
- Genre: Soundtrack
- Length: 34:01
- Label: Aditya Music
- Producer: Vandemataram Srinivas

Vandemataram Srinivas chronology
Swayamvaram (1999)	Jayam Manadera (2000)	Kante Koothurne Kanu (2000)

Video Songs Jukebox
- Jayam Manadera – Jukebox on YouTube

Music composed by Vandemataram Srinivas. Music released on Aditya Music Company. Kumar Sanu and Jaspinder Narula made their singing debuts in Telugu with this film.

No.	Title	Lyrics	Singer(s)	Length
1.	"Don't Miss"	Chandrabose	Shankar Mahadevan	4:59
2.	"Meriseti Jaabili"	Sirivennela Sitarama Sastry	Kumar Sanu, Swarnalatha	5:32
3.	"Happy Ga Jolly Ga"	Veturi Sundararama Murthy	Sonu Nigam, Gopika Poornima	4:32
4.	"Hindustan Lo"	Chandrabose	Udit Narayan, Jaspinder Narula	4:59
5.	"Pelliki Baja"	Chandrabose	S. P. Balasubrahmanyam, Kavita Krishnamurthy	4:44
6.	"O Chupuke"	Chandrabose	S. P. Balasubrahmanyam, Anuradha Sriram	4:58
7.	"Chinni Chinni"	Kalekuri Prasad	Vandemataram Srinivas	4:45
Total length:				34:01

== Release and reception ==
The film released with 114 prints in 149 centres.

Jeevi of Idlebrain wrote "First half of the film is ok. But the second half of the film is boring and as we reach the climax, elevating elements are peak. One of the outstanding movies Venky has chosen at this point of his career".

Indiainfo wrote "Venkatesh strikes again. Last year his film Kalisundam..raa not only became super hit but fetched him awards including Nandi also. This time on the occasion of Vijaya dasami venky offers a new film Jayam Manade Raa . Like all of his recent films Jayam Manade Raa is a film with different style. Good screenplay and foot tapping music made Jayam Manade Raa worth watching".

=== Box office ===
The film collected a distributors' share of Rs. 12 crore in its lifetime theatrical run, and a distributors' share of Rs. 3.04 crore in its opening week.

== Awards ==
Filmfare Awards South

- Best Actor - Telugu - Venkatesh (2000).

Nandi Awards - 2000

- Best Villain - Jaya Prakash Reddy
- Best Supporting Actress - Jhansi
