= Jayamma Panchayathi =

- Theatrical release poster
- Directed by: Vijay Kumar Kalivarapu
- Written by: Vijay Kumar Kalivarapu
- Produced by: Balaga Prakash
- Starring: Suma Kanakala
- Cinematography: Anush Kumar
- Edited by: Ravi Teja Girijala
- Music by: M. M. Keeravani
- Production company: Vennela Creations
- Release date: 6 May 2022
- Country: India
- Language: Telugu

Jayamma Panchayathi (transl. Jayamma's council) is a 2022 Indian Telugu-language drama film written and directed by debutant Vijay Kumar Kalivarapu. The film stars Suma Kanakala. It features music composed by M. M. Keeravani.

Jayamma Panchayathi was theatrically released on 6 May 2022.

== Plot ==
Jayamma is a hard-working righteous person. Everyone in the village respects her a lot. Jayamma and her family consider the entire village as their own and never back down whenever people needed financial support during any functions or events. People of the village hence respect them and obey Jayamma and her strict principles. In the same village, there is a priest who resides in the hillside Shiva temple. He is very lazy by nature and has habits like drinking and gambling due to which villagers do not go to his temple except Mondays. He falls in love with a temple priest's daughter and she also reciprocates his love.

In the same village, a boy named Yesu Babu likes Jayamma's elder daughter Pushpa and tries to woo her by gifting her silver anklets. Pushpa also likes Yesu and likes spending time with him. Things get complicated when Jayamma's husband gets heart pain and the doctor tells her that he needs heart surgery immediately and it will cost ₹400,000 for the treatment. Jayamma expects the return gifts from all the villagers for the first event in her family, invites everyone in the village and relatives and expects to treat her husband with the gift money. However, tables turn down when she receives only ₹77,000 from villagers which shocks her. Determined to get gift money from everyone she starts going to each everyone's house and starts collecting gift money. She reaches out to each one individually and also seeks the village council to get her justice and ensure everyone gives her the gift money. Days go by and finally, only a few villagers remain to give her money.

The first person rejects to give money to Jayamma who is the elder brother of her husband and due to family disputes, he keeps no tie with the Jayamma family and rejects to help Jayamma. The second person is the villager whose kid had fallen sick and the villagers believe it is the work of a black magic guy who is mute and uneducated and always roams in the forest learning black magic tricks. Since his kid is fallen sick and serious he refuses to gift money to Jayamma and asks the council to throw the black magic guy in the village. But later it is revealed that the black magic guy is an ayurvedic practitioner and the kid who fell sick is his best friend to make the kid well he is roaming in the forest to find the medicine. Due to his medicine, the kid gets well soon and the villagers apologise to Jayamma and give her money. The priest said he will give money to Jayamma once he is married but at that moment it is revealed that the girl he loves belongs to a lower caste and the village head throws the family out of the village. Later they realize their mistake and allow the priest to marry his lover.

The boy who roams around Pushpa is thrown out of the house as he used up the money buying anklets so Pushpa hides the boy in their attic. Later both of them are caught by Jayamma and run into the forest and are captured by naxals. Jayamma rescues them and warns the boy to stay away from her daughter. The father of the boy thanks her and helps her with money. Jayamma's brother-in-law passes away with the same disease as his brother, her sister-in-law ends the enmity between the families by helping Jayamma.

Thus, Jayamma saves her husband. Two years later Jayamama husband again falls sick due to a delay in operation and needs another surgery and villagers come to know that Jayamma is organizing functions for her younger daughter. The villagers run away in a nightmare.

== Cast ==
- Suma Kanakala as Jayamma
- Devi Prasad as Gauri Naidu
- Dinesh Kumar Kadambala
- Shalini Kondepudi
- Joy
- Nikitha
- Ganesh Yadav
- Bhuvan Saluru
- Gedela Trinadh
- Amma Ramakrishna
- Mayanandh Thakur
- Reddi Maheswara Rao
- D Hema

== Production and release ==
Jayamma Panchayathi features television presenter Suma Kanakala in the lead role. The film marks the directorial debut of Vijay Kumar Kalivarapu and is produced by Balaga Prakash of Vennela Creations. Music is composed by M. M. Keeravani. The film's title was unveiled in November 2021.

In April 2022, the film's release date was announced as 6 May 2022.

== Soundtrack ==
Music by M. M. Keeravani.

== Reception ==
Writing for The Hindu, Y. Sunita Chowdhary wrote that "Debut director Dinesh Kalivarapu has his heart in the right place; his writing skills come to the fore in every scene and expression of the artistes". The Times of India critic Thadhagath Pathi opined that "Films like Jayamma Panchayathi are rare in Tollywood and it's on the audience to not let such stories bite the dust. If you're up for a feel good film, this one's for you". ABP Desam gave a positive review for the film, with a particular praise to performances, direction and score.

A reviewer from Eenadu appreciated Kanakala's performance, the rural setting and humour while criticizing the lack of emotional depth. In another critical review, Srivathsan Nadadhur of OTT Play called it a directionless rural drama, saying Kanakala was the "only saving grace."
