= Kross Pictures =

South Korean multinational film and television production company

Kross Pictures, Inc.
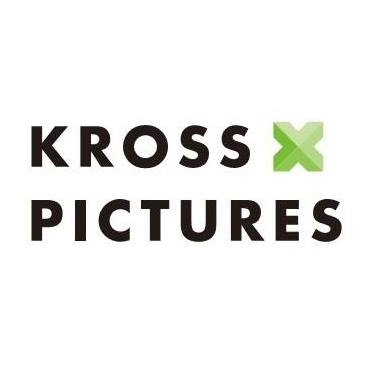
- Native name: 크로스픽쳐스 주식회사
- Type: Film Production Company
- Industry: Media
- Founded: 2003; 23 years ago
- Founder: Hyunwoo Thomas Kim
- Headquarters: Seoul, South Korea
- Area served: South Korea, India, United States, Japan, Vietnam, China
- Key people: Hyunwoo Thomas Kim (Co-founder, President & CEO)
- Services: Film/TV series Production; Film Distribution; Content Licensing; Webtoon Platform Service
- Website: http://krosspictures.com

Kross Pictures, Inc. is a South Korean multinational film and television production company with offices in Seoul, Los Angeles, and Mumbai. The company was co-founded and is currently led by Hyunwoo Thomas Kim.

The company's core business areas include film production and distribution, web novel and webtoon production, book publishing, and webtoon platform services.

== History ==
Founded in 2003 in Los Angeles, Kross Pictures is a cross-border film and television production company. The company primarily focuses on identifying and acquiring established intellectual property to produce localized films and television series for various markets.

Its first Chinese-language production, The Devotion of Suspect X, opened at the top of the Chinese box office and achieved a total gross of approximately CN¥410 million.

The company's second Indian feature film, Oh! Baby, was released on 5 July 2019, and reached the top position at the box office in the Telugu-speaking region.

On 7 December 2019, Kross Pictures launched Kross Komics, described as the first digital comics platform in India, through its subsidiary Kross Komics, Inc.

On 14 August 2020, KakaoPage (now Kakao Entertainment) announced the acquisition of 49 per cent of Kross Pictures' shares for ₩5.9 billion.

Kross Pictures has won two copyright infringement cases, including one against the producers of the 2017 Kannada film Pushpaka Vimana, which was deemed an unauthorised remake of the 2013 Korean film Miracle in Cell No. 7. The company also won a case against the producers of the 2019 Tamil film Kolaigaran, an unauthorised adaptation of the Japanese novel The Devotion of Suspect X.

In October 2021, Kakao Entertainment acquired the remaining 51 per cent of Kross Pictures' shares. In December 2021, it acquired 99 per cent of Kross Komics' shares through Kross Pictures, making both companies wholly owned subsidiaries.

== Filmography ==
=== Films produced ===
Year	Film	Country	Director	Cast	Notes
2014	God's Eye View	South Korea	Lee Jang-ho	Oh Kwang-rok	
2016	Te3n	India	Ribhu Dasgupta	Amitabh Bachchan, Vidya Balan, Nawazuddin Siddiqui	Hindi remake of Montage
2017	The Devotion of Suspect X	China	Alec Su	Wang Kai, Zhang Luyi, Ruby Lin	Based on the novel of same name
2018	100 Days of Sunshine	Vietnam	Phoenix Vu	Jun Pham, Kha Ngan, B Tran	Remake of Never Ending Story
2019	Oh! Baby	India	B. V. Nandini Reddy	Samantha Akkineni, Lakshmi	Telugu remake of Miss Granny
2021	Netrikann	India	Milind Rau	Nayanthara, Ajmal Ameer	Tamil remake of Blind
2022	Saakini Daakini	India	Sudheer Varma	Regina Cassandra, Niveda Thomas	Telugu remake of Midnight Runners
2023	Blind	India	Shome Makhija	Sonam Kapoor, Purab Kohli, Vinay Pathak	Hindi remake of Blind
2023	Jaane Jaan	India	Sujoy Ghosh	Kareena Kapoor, Vijay Varma, Jaideep Ahlawat	Based on the novel The Devotion of Suspect X
2023	Knuckle Girl	Japan	Chang	Ayaka Miyoshi, Hideaki Itō, Yōsuke Kubozuka	Based on the Korean webtoon of same name Knuckle Girl

==== Upcoming films ====
As of the latest available information, the company is involved in the production of several projects at various stages of development.

- Hindi-language Indian remake of the Korean film Miracle in Cell No. 7.
- Hindi-language Indian remake of the Korean film A Hard Day.
- Hindi-language Indian remake of the Korean film Midnight Runners.
- Hindi-language Indian remake of the Korean film Miss Granny.
- U.S. adaptation of the Japanese mystery novel The Devotion of Suspect X.
- Indian adaptation of the 2021 Korean film Sinkhole.

=== TV series produced ===
Year	TV Series	Country	Cast	Notes
2012	Dr. Jin	South Korea	Song Seung-heon, Park Min-young	Based on the manga Jin by Motoka Murakami; Co-produced by Victory Contents
2016	Cheese In The Trap	South Korea	Park Hae-jin, Kim Go-eun, Seo Kang-joon	Based on the webtoon of the same title by Soonkki; Co-produced by Eight Works
2016	The Sound of Your Heart	South Korea	Lee Kwang-soo, Jung So-min	Based on the webtoon of the same title by Jo Seok; Co-produced by The Sound of Your Heart SPC
2017–18	Untouchable	China	Xing Zhaolin, Zhang Yuxi	
2018	The Sound of Your Heart: Reboot	South Korea	Sung Hoon, Shim Hye-jin, Kwon Yu-ri	Based on the webtoon of the same title by Jo Seok
2022	Business Proposal	South Korea	Ahn Hyo-seop, Kim Se-jeong, Kim Min-kyu, Seol In-ah	Based on the webtoon of the same title by HaeHwa; Co-produced by Kakao Entertainment and Studio S
2022	Again My Life	South Korea	Lee Joon-gi, Lee Geung-young, Kim Ji-eun	Based on the web novel by Lee Hae-nal; Co-produced by Samhwa Networks
2022	Roppongi Class	Japan	Ryoma Takeuchi, Yurina Hirate, Yuko Araki, Kagawa Teruyuki	Based on the Korean webtoon Itaewon Class by Kwang Jin and the Korean drama of the same title Co-produced by Kakao Entertainment, SLL and TV Asahi
2025	Ms. Incognito	South Korea	Jeon Yeo-been, Jingyoung, Jang Yoon-ju, Joo Hyun-young	Released in ENA.
2026	See You at Work Tomorrow!	South Korea	Seo In-guk, Park Ji-hyun, Kang Mi-na	Released in tvN. Based on the webtoon Back to Work! by McQueen Studio & Co-produced by Studio Dragon
2026	Love Always	India	Jayasudha, V. Jayaprakash, Gouri G. Kishan, Ramzan Muhammed	Tamil series currently in post production. Based on the Korean webtoon "We are so over or... Not" Will be launched in JioStar.

==== Upcoming Series ====
- 10 Dates: India series currently in development. Based on a Korean series "Business Proposal".
- Ms. Incognito: India series currently in development. Based on a Korean series "Ms. Incognito".
- Unscripted shows:
  - Bloody game: India & Japan adaptation in development. Based on a Korean unscripted show "Bloody Game" franchise.
  - Heart Signal: India adaptation in development. Based on a Korean unscripted dating reality show "Heart Signal".
  - Love After Divorce: India adaptation in development. Based on a Korean unscripted reality show "Love After Divorce".
  - Back to the Ground: India adaptation in development. Based on a Korean unscripted show "Back to the Ground".
