= Midnight Runners =

2017 South Korean action comedy film

- Theatrical release poster
- Hangul: 청년경찰
- Hanja: 靑年警察
- RR: Cheongnyeongyeongchal
- MR: Ch'ŏngnyŏn'gyŏngch'al
- Directed by: Jason Kim
- Written by: Jason Kim
- Produced by: Kim Jae-joong
- Starring: Park Seo-joon; Kang Ha-neul; Sung Dong-il; Park Ha-sun
- Edited by: Kim Chang-ju
- Production company: Movie Rock
- Distributed by: Lotte Entertainment
- Release date: 9 August 2017
- Running time: 109 minutes
- Country: South Korea
- Language: Korean
- Budget: US$7 million
- Box office: US$39.7 million

Midnight Runners (Korean: 청년경찰; RR: Cheongnyeongyeongchal; lit. 'Young Cop') is a 2017 South Korean action comedy film directed by Jason Kim and produced by Kim Jae-joong under Movie Rock. The film stars Park Seo-joon and Kang Ha-neul, with Sung Dong-il and Park Ha-sun in supporting roles.

Midnight Runners was released on 9 August 2017. An Indian remake titled Saakini Daakini was released on 16 September 2022.

== Plot ==
Ki-joon and Hee-yeol are best friends and students at the Korean National Police University. One night while out drinking in Gangnam, they witness the kidnapping of a young girl and consequently report it to the Gangnam police station. However, the station's Missing Persons Unit prioritizes a high-profile kidnapping of a business mogul's grandson over the case. Knowing they are in the critical hours after a kidnapping, the duo take matters into their own hands.

Through their amateur investigation, Ki-joon and Hee-yeol catch up with the kidnappers, who are running an unfertilized egg harvesting ring, and learn that many more girls are locked up in their hideout. Ki-joon and Hee-yeol try to save them, but are beaten and locked up. After escaping their captors, the duo later return to an empty hideout and a cold trail. As they are only students, their professor Yang Sung-il warns them against pursuing the case or risk facing expulsion.

Unable to wait, they once again embark on their own investigation. With the help of CCTV footage, they track the van to a fertility clinic. They undergo heavy physical training and "borrow" armor equipment from the University. Ki-joon and Hee-yeol go to the fertility clinic, where they subdue all the enforcers, including their boss Yang-choon. They call the police to arrest the kidnappers despite knowing they will get expelled for their actions.

Due to some of the disciplinary committee members in university believing that they had done the right thing morally, Ki-joon and Hee-yeol are instead held back a year in their studies and sentenced to 500 hours of community service, leaving the two satisfied with the outcome. While completing their community service, Yun-Jung visits Ki-joon and Hee-yeol and thanks them for rescuing her.

== Cast ==
- Park Seo-joon as Park Ki-joon, a light-hearted risk taker who acts first and thinks later
- Kang Ha-neul as Kang Hee-yeol, the total opposite of Ki-joon and more of a thinker than a doer
- Sung Dong-il as Professor Yang Sung-il
- Park Ha-sun as Lee Joo-hee / Medusa
- Go Jun as Yang-choon
- Bae Yoo-ram as Jae-ho
- Lee Ho-jung as Lee Yoon-jung
- Lee Kyu-sung as Police academy student
- Lee Jun-hyuk as Professor Ha
- Seo Jeong-yeon as Ki-joon's mother
- Choi Hong-il as Hee-yeol's father
- Lee Eun-saem as Eun-sam
- Byeon Woo-seok as Club entertainer
- Jung Ye-ji as Dan-yeong, Police force student
- Ryu Kyung-soo as Police academy conscripted policeman
- Lee Se-hee as Club woman Se-hee

== Production ==
Midnight Runners marks Park Seo-joon's first time playing a lead role in a film.

Midnight Runners was sold to six countries at the Hong Kong International Film & TV Market. The rights to the film have been purchased by companies including Japan's The Klockworx, Taiwan's Long Shong, Hong Kong's Deltamac HK, the Philippines' Viva Comm and Singapore's Purple Plan.

Filming began on 21 November 2016 in Yongin, South Korea and ended on 23 February 2017.

== Release and reception ==
=== Local ===
The film was released on 9 August 2017. It was screened across South Korea in 1,058 theatres. The film placed second at the box office on the opening day and earned US$1.97 million with a total of 308,303 ticket sales.

During the first five days of its release, the film attracted 1.9 million viewers and earned a total of US$13.6 million.

Within the first eight days after its release, the movie garnered 2.73 million admissions, earning a total of US$18.9 million, which exceeded the production budget of US$6.13 million.

By 20 August, less than two weeks after the movie was released, Midnight Runners had been watched by a total of 3,906,566 people. By 21 August, within 13 days after its premiere, the movie surpassed 4 million ticket sales. As of 24 August, the film has grossed US$30 million with a total of 4.3 million ticket sales. The total number of admissions increased to 4.83 million by 27 August 19 days after the movie was released, and the film earned a gross income of US$34.04 million. As of 14 September, five weeks after its release, the film reached 5.61 million admissions mark with US$39 million gross, making it the 7th highest-grossing South Korean film in 2017.

=== International ===
Midnight Runners was screened in 12 countries. After the initial release in local cinemas, the film was released in Indonesia on 23 August, followed by North America on 25 August, Australia on 31 August then proceeded to be screened in New Zealand, Hong Kong, Britain, Singapore, Malaysia, Japan, Taiwan, Vietnam, and the Philippines.

=== Remake ===
The official Indian remake in Telugu language is titled Saakini Daakini, and was produced by Guru Films and Suresh Productions. It stars Regina Cassandra and Nivetha Thomas in the lead roles, and was directed by Sudheer Varma, where the film was released on 16 September 2022. In the Indian remake, the protagonists are female, while in the original film the protagonists are male.

== Awards and nominations ==
Year	Award	Category	Recipient	Result	Ref.
2017	26th Buil Film Awards	Best New Actor	Park Seo-joon	Nominated	
2017	37th Korean Association of Film Critics Awards	Best New Actor	Park Seo-joon	Won	
2017	37th Korean Association of Film Critics Awards	Top 10 Films	Midnight Runners	Won	
2017	54th Grand Bell Awards	Best New Actor	Park Seo-joon	Won	
2017	54th Grand Bell Awards	Best New Director	Jason Kim	Nominated	
2017	1st The Seoul Awards	Best New Actor	Park Seo-joon	Nominated	
2017	6th Korea Film Actors Association Awards	Popular Star Award	Park Seo-joon	Won	
2018	9th Korea Film Reporters Association Film Awards (KOFRA)	Best New Actor	Park Seo-joon	Won	
2018	23rd Chunsa Film Art Awards	Best New Actor	Park Seo-joon	Nominated	
