= Nivetha Thomas =

Indian actress (born 1994)

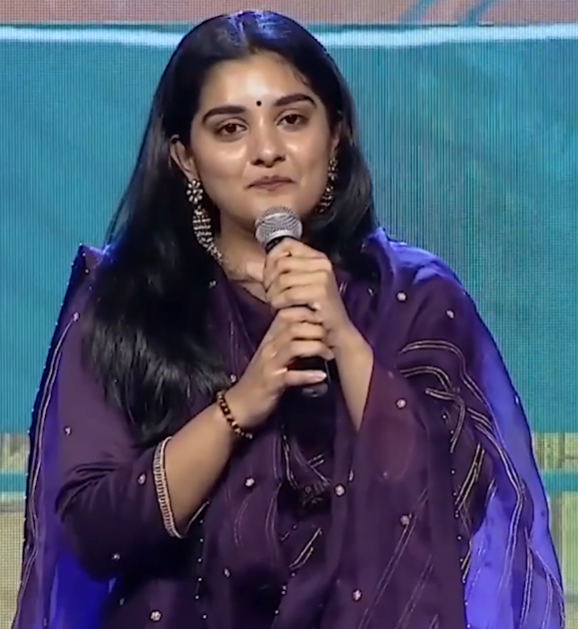
- Nivetha in 2022
- Born: 2 November 1995 (age 31); Chennai, Tamil Nadu, India
- Education: B.Arch. (SRM)
- Alma mater: SRM Institute of Science and Technology
- Occupation: Actress
- Years active: 2008–present

Nivetha Thomas (born 2 November 1995) is an Indian actress who appears in Telugu, Malayalam and Tamil language films. She made her film debut as a child artist in the 2008 Malayalam film Veruthe Oru Bharya. Nivetha is an recipient of a Filmfare Award, one Kerala State Film Award and a Telangana Gaddar Film Award.

Nivetha made her Telugu film debut with Gentleman (2016) and won the SIIMA Award for Best Female Debut - Telugu. Nivetha went on to star in successful films like Chaappa Kurishu (2011), Romans (2013), Jilla (2014), Papanasam (2015), Ninnu Kori (2017), Jai Lava Kusa (2017), 118 (2019), Brochevarevarura (2019), V (2020), Vakeel Saab (2021) and Saakini Daakini (2022), 35 Chinna Katha Kaadu (2024).

== Early life and education ==
Nivetha was born on 2 November 1995 in Madras (now Chennai), India. She is a native of Edoor village of Iritty taluk, Kerala.

She was schooled at Holy Angels and Montfort Matriculation School, Chennai and pursued Bachelor of Architecture from SRM University. She can speak six languages — Malayalam, Tamil, French, Hindi, Telugu, and English.

== Career ==
=== Child artist and early work (2000–2015) ===
Nivetha started her career as a child actress, acting in the popular Sun TV serial My Dear Bootham. After that, she made her film debut in 2008 playing Jayaram's daughter in Veruthe Oru Bharya, where her performance was well appreciated and won her the Kerala State Film Award for Best Child Artist. She then signed a few Tamil and Malayalam films in which she mostly played supporting roles. Among her Malayalam projects were Chaappa Kurish and Thattathin Marayathu, the latter of which according to Sify was going to be "the biggest box-office hit in the history of Malayalam cinema". The 2011 Tamil film Poraali directed by Samuthirakani, featured her as Tamizhselvi, a petrol bunk employee.

In 2013, Nivetha acted in Romans which was very successful and named a "blockbuster" by Sify.com. In the Tamil contemporary fantasy comedy Naveena Saraswathi Sabatham she played the female lead role of Jaishree, an aspiring singer. In Jilla, she played the role of Mahalakshmi, who is very attached to her father (Mohanlal) and two brothers, played by Vijay and Mahath. About her role, she stated that it was not "just another sister role" but that of "a strong willed girl who influences her brother in a positive way".

In 2015, Nivetha played Selvi, Kamal Haasan's eldest daughter who accidentally murders her blackmailer in the Tamil remake of Drishyam, titled Papanasam. The film emerged a commercial success at the box office. Anupama Subramanian Deccan Chronicle noted, "Nivetha as the elder daughter gives a splendid act and helps create the mood and atmosphere of the flick."

=== Critical acclaim and commercial success (2016–present) ===
Nivetha's career marked a turning point in 2016 with her expansion to Telugu films. She appeared in Gentleman opposite Nani, where she played Catherine, a VFX designer. The film was a box office success. Mridula Ramadugu noted, "Nivetha stands out. She is natural, quick and is a refreshing break from the usual portrayal of female leads in regular dramas." Purnima Sriram stated, "Nivetha owns the show. Her eyes were enough to emote. She owned every frame." It became her breakthrough and her performance earned her the SIIMA Award for Best Female Debut – Telugu and nomination for Filmfare Award for Best Actress – Telugu.

Following this, her first release in 2017 was Ninnu Kori opposite Nani and Aadhi Pinisetty. She played Pallavi who is torn between her husband and former lover. The film earned her second Filmfare Best Actress – Telugu nomination. The film was a commercial success and Suresh Kavirayani noted, "Nivetha steals the show with her stunning performance and right emotions." In her next release Jai Lava Kusa, she played Simran opposite Jr. NTR. The film emerged a success and one of the highest grossing Telugu film of the year. Sify stated that her character lacked "appealing factor". In her last release of the year, she appeared in Juliet Lover of Idiot opposite Naveen Chandra, which was a box office failure. In October 2018, she signed Swaasa, opposite Nikhil Siddharth, which remains unreleased.

In her first release of 2019, Nivetha played Aadhya, a teacher who was murdered opposite Nandamuri Kalyan Ram in 118. Sangeetha Devi Dundoo noted, "Nivetha live up to her credentials of being able performer and shine in the material given to her." The film emerged a box office success. In her next film Brochevarevarura opposite Sree Vishnu, she played Mithra an average student who aspires to become a classical dancer. The film became one of the year's highest grossing release. Krishna Sripada of The News Minute stated, "Nivetha should be singled out for her extremely articulate acting almost overshadowing everyone else in every frame."

In her first film of 2020, Nivetha appeared in Darbar (2020) as Rajinikanth's daughter Valli. The film emerged as the highest grossing Tamil film of the year. Karthik Kumar stated, "Nivetha gets decent screen presence and her scenes with Rajinikanth are fun and full of life.'" She next appeared in V as Apoorva, an aspiring crime novelist opposite Sudheer Babu. It was released on Amazon Prime Video. Haricharan Pudipeddi stated that she is "wasted" in a role with no purpose.

In 2021, Nivetha appeared in Vakeel Saab, the Telugu remake of Hindi film Pink, co-starring Pawan Kalyan. She played Pallavi, a software engineer and victim of molestation. The film became the second highest grossing Telugu film of the year.

Nivetha also starred in Sudheer Varma-directed Saakini Daakini, the Telugu remake of the Korean film Midnight Runners, along with Regina Cassandra.

== Media image ==
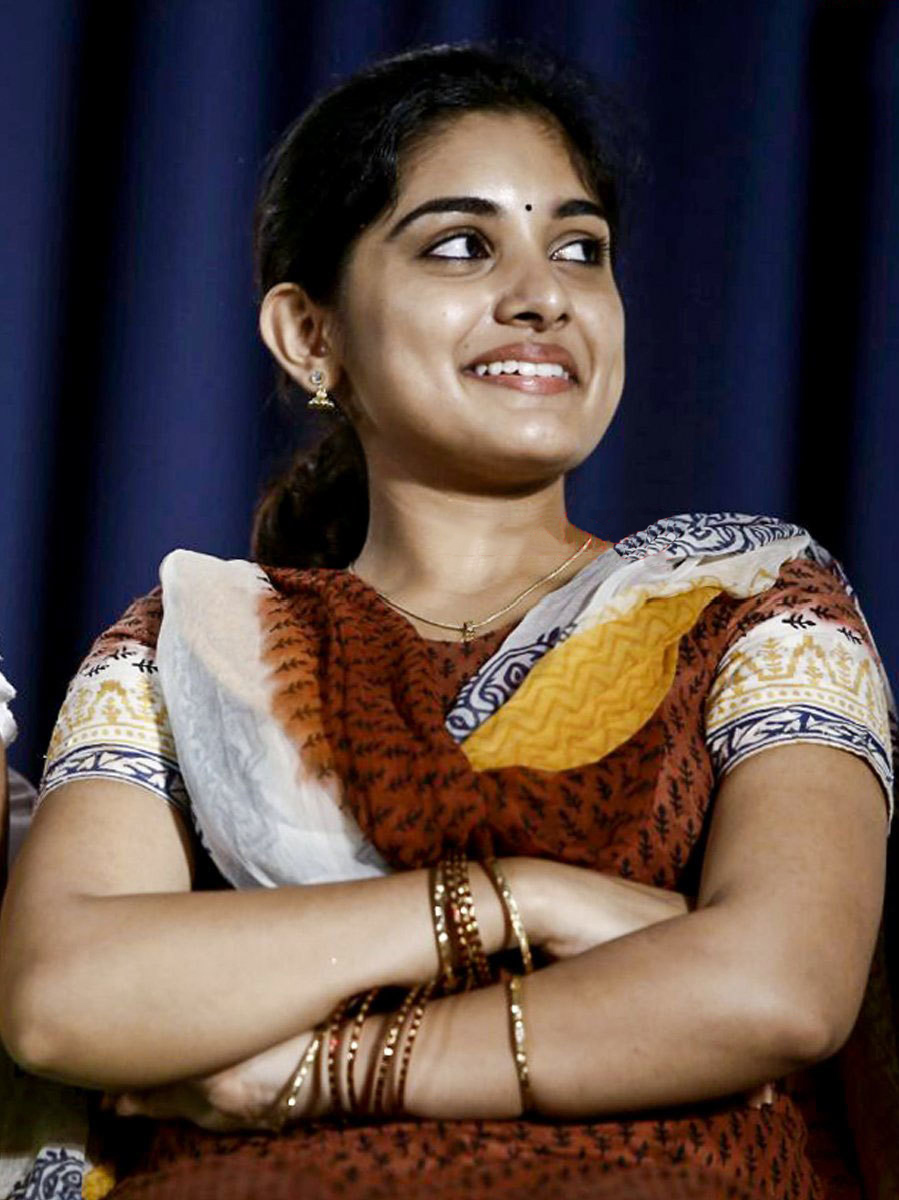
Nivetha at an event in 2015

In Hyderabad Times Most Desirable Women list, she was placed 18th in 2017. In 2024, The Hollywood Reporter India place her in its "Top 10 Telugu Performers" list. Actors Nani and Rana Daggubati have named Nivetha among Telugu cinema's "brightest talent".

== Filmography ==
=== Film ===
Key
†	Denotes films that have not yet been released

Year	Title	Role	Language(s)	Notes	Ref.
2008	Veruthe Oru Bharya	Anjana Sugunan	Malayalam	Child artist	
2008	Kuruvi	Vetrivel's sister	Tamil	Child artist	
2009	Madhya Venal	Manuja/Manikutty	Malayalam		
2011	Pranayam	Young Grace	Malayalam		
2011	Chaappa Kurish	Nafiza	Malayalam		
2011	Poraali	Tamizhselvi	Tamil		
2012	Thattathin Marayathu	Fatima	Malayalam		
2013	Romans	Eleena	Malayalam		
2013	Naveena Saraswathi Sabatham	Jeyasri	Tamil		
2014	Jilla	Mahalakshmi	Tamil		
2014	Money Ratnam	Pia Mammen	Malayalam		
2015	Papanasam	Selvi Suyambulingam	Tamil		
2016	Gentleman	Catherine	Telugu		
2017	Ninnu Kori	Pallavi	Telugu		
2017	Jai Lava Kusa	Simran	Telugu		
2017	Juliet Lover of Idiot	Julie	Telugu		
2019	118	Aadhya	Telugu		
2019	Brochevarevarura	Mithra	Telugu		
2020	Darbar	Vallikkannu “Valli”	Tamil		
2020	V	Apoorva Ramanujan	Telugu		
2021	Vakeel Saab	Vemula Pallavi	Telugu		
2022	Saakini Daakini	SI Shalini	Telugu		
2023	Enthada Saji	Sajimol Thomas	Malayalam		
2024	35 Chinna Katha Kaadu	Bala Saraswati	Telugu		
2026	Srimathi (2026)	Madhusree	Telugu		

=== Television ===
Year	Title	Role	Network	Language	Notes
2000	Raja Rajeswari			Tamil	
2004–2007	My Dear Bootham	Gowri	Sun TV	Tamil	
2004–2006	Shivamayam	Ponni	Sun TV	Tamil	
2007–2008	Arase	Young Kaveri	Sun TV	Tamil	
2005–2006	Raja Rajeswari	Nallama	Sun TV	Tamil	
2008	Thenmozhiyal	Maheswari	Kalaignar TV	Tamil	
2017	Bigg Boss 1	Herself	Star Maa	Telugu	Guest appearance

== Awards and nominations ==
Year	Award	Category	Film	Result	Ref.
2008	Kerala State Film Awards	Best Child Artist	Veruthe Oru Bharya	Won	
2017	South Indian International Movie Awards	Best Female Debut – Telugu	Gentleman	Won	
2017	TSR– TV9 National Film Awards	Best Debut Actress	Gentleman	Won	
2017	Filmfare Awards South	Best Actress – Telugu	Gentleman	Nominated	
2017	Zee Telugu Golden Awards	Entertainer of The Year – Female	Ninnu Kori & Jai Lava Kusa	Nominated	
2018	Zee Telugu Apsara Awards	Performer of the Year	Jai Lava Kusa	Won	
2018	Filmfare Awards South	Best Actress – Telugu	Ninnu Kori	Nominated	
2022	South Indian International Movie Awards	Best Supporting Actress – Telugu	Vakeel Saab	Nominated	
2025	Telangana Gaddar Film Awards	Best Actress	35 Chinna Katha Kaadu	Won	
2025	South Indian International Movie Awards	Best Actress – Telugu	35 Chinna Katha Kaadu	Nominated	
2026	Filmfare Awards South	Best Actress – Telugu	35 Chinna Katha Kaadu	Won	
