= Brahmotsavam (film) =

2016 Indian film by Srikanth Addala

- Theatrical release poster
- Directed by: Srikanth Addala
- Written by: Srikanth Addala
- Produced by: Prasad V. Potluri; Param V. Potluri; Kavin Anne
- Starring: Mahesh Babu; Samantha Ruth Prabhu; Kajal Aggarwal; Revathi
- Cinematography: R. Rathnavelu
- Edited by: Kotagiri Venkateswara Rao
- Music by: Mickey J. Meyer (Songs); Gopi Sundar (Background Score)
- Production companies: PVP cinema G. Mahesh Babu Entertainment
- Release date: 20 May 2016
- Running time: 154 minutes
- Country: India
- Language: Telugu
- Budget: ₹75 crore
- Box office: est. ₹63.70 crore

Brahmotsavam (transl. Festival of Brahma) is a 2016 Indian Telugu-language family melodrama film written and directed by Srikanth Addala. The film was co-produced by Prasad V. Potluri under the banner PVP cinema in association with G. Mahesh Babu Entertainment. It stars Mahesh Babu, Kajal Aggarwal, Sathyaraj, Rao Ramesh, Samantha Ruth Prabhu and Pranitha Subhash. Gopi Sundar scored the film while Mickey J. Meyer composed the film's soundtrack album. R. Rathnavelu and Kotagiri Venkateswara Rao handled the film's cinematography and editing respectively.

Addala worked on the film's script for more than a year, announced on collaborating for a new project with Babu in October 2014. Babu signed this project before the completion of his previous film Srimanthudu (2015). The film was launched on 31 May 2015, whereas principal photography commenced in August 2015. Major portions of the film were shot at the Ramoji Film City in Hyderabad, with filming also took place in Ooty, Chennai and Varanasi, before the shooting process being wrapped in March 2016. Released on 20 May 2016, the film received negative reviews from critics and was a box office bomb, grossing only ₹63.70 crore amidst a budget of ₹75 crore.

== Plot ==
Chantibabu is a successful entrepreneur in the paint industry and a respected figure within his family and the wider community. He lives in Vijayawada with his wife, Mahalakshmi, and their son, who is also called Babu. Babu is a charming and friendly bachelor who runs his father's company. Chantibabu's younger daughter lives in London with her husband. Mahalakshmi's four stepbrothers also work with Chantibabu in the family business. Although they live in different houses, the families celebrate every occasion together.

However, Peddabbai, the eldest of Mahalakshmi's stepbrothers, is envious of his brother-in-law's fame because their father lent Chantibabu ₹400 to start his business. Everyone credits Chantibabu. Peddabbai keeps himself separate from the crowd and the celebrations. His wife, Rajyalakshmi, suggests they marry their daughter to Babu to ease his suffering. Peddabbai struggles to find a way to broach the subject with his brother-in-law. However, Chantibabu learns of his intentions and decides to speak with Babu himself.

Meanwhile, Kasi Annapurna, a free-spirited NRI from Australia, arrives in India. Her father, a friend of Chantibabu's, drops her off at his house. Babu and Kasi develop feelings for each other, but they have different ideas about living with family. Kasi prefers independence and wants to experience more in life. While touring Ooty, Kasi opens up to Babu, and they agree to end their relationship. Before saying goodbye, they kiss. Peddabbai then leaves Ooty. Worried, Chantibabu calls everyone home to settle things down. Peddabbai angrily confronts Chantibabu, demanding that he leave him and his family alone. Saddened by this, Chantibabu dies.

On her way to Brahmotsavam, Babu's sister's friend from London pays the family a visit. Babu tries to rebuild his relationship with Peddabbai, but without success. He then leaves with her on a road trip. During the trip, he meets distant relatives from seven generations ago and shares experiences with them. Over time, Babu and his sister's friend grow closer. They meet Peddabbai, who has become very successful. Pranitha is about to marry a minister's son. Although Peddabbai does this willingly to show off, he secretly wants Babu to marry his daughter. He asks Pranitha to leave Babu for his daughter's sake. Respecting his wishes, Pranitha leaves for Brahmotsavam, tearfully kissing Babu goodbye. Meanwhile, Peddabbai and Ramachandra Prasad decide to pursue the alliance with the minister's son. Despite it being a grand wedding, neither Babu nor Mahalakshmi are invited.

In an attempt to save face, they decide to go anyway. Peddabbai insults them. After a series of confrontations, Babu finds out that Chantibabu has left all his property in his name. He said, "Peddabbai was there for me through good times and bad, and he deserves it." Peddabbai then knelt down in front of Babu, apologising and crying. Things returned to normal, and the whole family went to Brahmotsavam, where they spoke to Babu's love interest about his wedding to her. Brahma (Samantha) and Otsavam (Mahesh Babu) became Brahmotsavam.

== Cast ==
- Mahesh Babu as Ajay/Babu
- Samantha Ruth Prabhu as Brahma NRI from London and friend of Bujji.
- Kajal Aggarwal as Kashi Annapurna, NRI From Australia, Babu's love interest
- Revathi as Mahalakshmi, Babu's mother
- Sathyaraj as Chantibabu, Babu's father
- Pranitha Subhash as Pranitha, Babu's cousin
- Prakash Raj as Ramachandra Prasad, Peddabbai's Brother in law
- Rao Ramesh as Peddabbai, Mahalakshmi's brother
- Jayasudha as Rajyalakshmi, Peddabbai's wife
- Pavani Gangireddy as Bujji, Babu's younger sister
- Subhalekha Sudhakar as Kasi's father
- Sriranjani as Kasi's mother
- Saranya Ponvannan as Babu's distant relative
- Easwari Rao as Bhoolakshmi, Naresh's wife
- Nassar as Babu's distant relative
- Naresh as Mahalakshmi's brother
- Brahmanandam as Bangaraju, Mahalakshmi's brother
- Raghu Babu as Siddhappa Naidu, Peddabbai's friend
- Sayaji Shinde as Rao Ramesh's brother
- Krishna Bhagavaan as Mahalakshmi's brother
- Rohini Hattangadi as Mahalakshmi's stepmother
- Mukesh Rishi as Babu's distant relative
- Tulasi as Varalakshmi, Siddhapa Naidu's wife
- Avantika Vandanapu as Babu's cousin
- Tanikella Bharani as Chantibabu's friend
- Posani Krishna Murali as Village Head
- Jaya Prakash Reddy as Businessman
- Paruchuri Venkateswara Rao as Venkatachalam, Businessman's friend
- Chandra Mohan as Chandram, Ajay's father
- Vennela Kishore as Lakkavarapu "Lilly" Lingaraju
- Rajitha as Krishna Bhagavan's wife
- Chandini Chowdary as Ananda Valli
- Srikanth Addala in a cameo appearance (with Samantha in Kashi portion)

== Production ==
=== Development ===
A source close to director Srikanth Addala told IANS in mid October 2014 that Addala would collaborate with Mahesh Babu for a film. Babu was impressed with Addala's new script and accepted to work with him after completing his existing commitments. Addala worked on the film's script for more than a year. The filming was expected to begin in May 2015 once Babu completes the shoot of Srimanthudu (2015). The film was tentatively titled as Brahmotsavam and Addala said in late December 2014 that it would be a family drama adding that he would begin the casting process soon.

Prasad V. Potluri accepted to bankroll the film under the banner PVP Cinema and wanted Babu to sign a three-film deal once he returns from his holiday in Dubai; this film being the first of the three and the remaining two in 2016. On 8 January 2015, Addala told IANS that the film is almost confirmed and added that it is too early to share any more information. Babu chose to act in this film disregard to the box office performance of Addala's previous film Mukunda (2014) and the film was expected to be a romantic entertainer. Mickey J. Meyer was signed in on to compose the film's music.

R. Rathnavelu was confirmed as the film's director of photography in early May 2015. A special logo of the film's title featuring both Venkateswara's feet and a poorna kumbham in addition was released on 30 May 2015, a day before the official launch ceremony. The poster confirmed A. Sreekar Prasad and Thota Tharani as the film's editor and art director respectively. An official statement from the makers confirmed that the film would be a bilingual shot simultaneously in Telugu and Tamil with the same title, marking Babu's first direct Tamil film. After opining that the script has the potential to commercially succeed in both the languages without making much changes, Babu accepted the proposal of a Telugu-Tamil bilingual. However, the plan was later on dropped.

=== Casting ===
The makers tried to approach Rajinikanth for a brief yet key role as per the film's script. They approached Rakul Preet Singh to play the female lead and she evinced interest to be a part of the film after the first round of discussions. The film's team announced a casting call on 4 March 2015 for male and female characters; the requirements being an age group of 15 – 50 years and four photographs — two full size and close up photographs each. A source from the film's unit reported Samantha Ruth Prabhu as one of the three female leads of the film in a statement to IANS on 15 April 2015, adding that Taapsee Pannu and Pranitha Subhash were called for a look test on the next day for the other two female lead roles.

Of the three female lead roles, the first two reportedly would have full-length roles while the third would pale in comparison. Sources close to the film's unit later added that parallel, wide open discussions were on regarding the female lead selection where a section of the technicians believe that fresh faces should be cast opposite Babu while a few opted for the inclusion of established female leads. A 30-day audition was held at Hyderabad from mid-April 2015. Babu, however, insisted that he would work with the actresses whose pairing with him received positive response from his fans. Rakul Preet Singh's manager confirmed her inclusion as one of the three female leads days later to the media. Though she denied signing the film during the promotions of Pandaga Chesko (2014), an official statement confirmed her and Pranitha as the female leads.

Jayasudha, Rao Ramesh and Tanikella Bharani were confirmed as a part of the film's supporting cast during the official launch ceremony. The makers chose Sathyaraj to play Babu's father in the film. The film's unit told IANS that his presence in a major role would appeal to Tamil audience as the film was promoted as a Telugu-Tamil bilingual. Mannara was rumoured to be approached by the makers for the second female lead role. The film's executive producer Rajiv later revealed that Mannara was never approached for any character in the film. Rajiv added that her manager approached the makers for a role after the rumour began spreading and they rejected the proposal as no character suited her.

Samantha replaced Rakul Preet Singh in mid June 2015 after the latter failed to adjust her call sheet due to scheduling conflicts. Brahmaji's inclusion in the film's cast was confirmed in late June 2015. Kajal Aggarwal told IANS on 28 June 2015 that she has been signed as one of the film's female leads. At the same time, a press release confirmed the inclusion of Revathi and Naresh in the film's supporting cast. The former of the two was reported to play Babu's mother in the film. Also, Pranitha's character was reported to be a cameo appearance. Tulasi joined the film's supporting cast in early July 2015, and was chosen to play Aggarwal's mother in the film. Chandini Chowdary was signed to make a cameo appearance in late September 2015.

Pavani Gangireddy was signed to play Babu's sister in the film, which she called a "more than the typical token hero's sister". In December 2015, Aggarwal revealed that she would be seen as a non-resident Indian in the film, adding that Brahmotsavam "is largely based on characters and not on leads" and that in the ensemble cast, each character is crucial in the film. At the same time, PVP Cinema announced another casting call for real life families who are interested in participating in the film's shoot. Saranya Ponvannan's inclusion in the film's cast was confirmed in mid-February 2016. In mid-March 2016, Pranitha revealed that she would play a traditional Telugu girl-next-door character from a very protective family, very bubbly and taking only the good from any situation in life. The character would sport simple kurtis and patiala pants. She further revealed that it will be the typical bava-maradalu (cousins) connection found in a Telugu household.

=== Filming ===
Principal photography commenced on 31 May 2015. Babu allotted ninety days of call sheet without any lengthy breaks for the film which was expected to be wrapped up by December 2015. The filming was delayed as Babu was busy promoting Srimanthudu and was expected to resume from late August 2015. The regular filming commenced on 16 September 2015 with a song shot in a set erected by Tharani and a crew of 513 members at Ramoji Film City. Babu along with 21 other artists participated in the song's shoot. Raju Sundaram choreographed the song on which ₹35 million was spent. During the film's shoot Shah Rukh Khan, Varun Dhawan and Kriti Sanon, who were shooting for Dilwale (2015) in Hyderabad, met Babu on the sets. The first schedule was wrapped up on 30 September 2015. The second schedule commenced on 5 October 2015 at Ramoji Film City in another set.

After taking a two-week break, Babu joined the film's sets in Hyderabad in early November 2015. The makers wanted to complete most of the film's shoot in the fresh schedule commenced, as many actors and actresses were involved. Filming continued at Ramoji Film City and Sathyaraj joined the film's sets in mid November 2015. Few scenes on Babu and Aggarwal were filmed at Chilkur before wrapping up the schedule. A fresh schedule commenced from 28 November 2015 again at Ramoji Film City. Upon its completion, filming continued at Ooty from 12 December 2015. After filming scenes on Babu, Sathyaraj and Pranitha, a song was filmed on the principal cast in a set erected by Tharani. The schedule was wrapped up by the end of December 2015.

Apart from the Ambattur industrial estate, the film was shot in and round Chennai from 11 to 15 January 2016. By then, 60% of the film shooting was wrapped up. The next schedule commenced from 19 January 2016 at Hyderabad. Brahmotsavam was later filmed in Varanasi from 1 March 2016, to 13 March 2016 before shifting to New Delhi and Udaipur for further shoot. The completion of the schedule meant wrapping up the principal photography, except for a song and few patchwork scenes which were planned to be filmed in Hyderabad. The North India schedule was wrapped up on 14 March 2016.

== Themes ==
The film was considered to be a film glorifying Babu's onscreen image as a lovable boy and a responsible son. During the film's official launch ceremony, Addala spoke about the film's theme by stating, "There would be beauty and happiness if some people are together. If there is a family with many members and if they celebrate every moment like a Utsavam, it is a Brahmotsavam", adding that the film's story would be on the lines of his previous directorial Seethamma Vakitlo Sirimalle Chettu (2013) which starred Babu and Samantha along with Daggubati Venkatesh and Anjali.

A source from the film's unit revealed that Brahmotsavam is all about family values and celebrating traditions. The bonding between the protagonist and his father along with the backdrop of his mother's family are the centerpiece of the film. The three female leads play an important role in the manner in which the protagonist realises the value of family when they go out on a journey exploring the family lineage and their place in the larger scheme of family links.

== Music ==
The film's soundtrack consisted of seven songs composed by Addala's regular collaborator Mickey J. Meyer and lyrics written by Sirivennela Seetharama Sastry, Krishna Chaitanya and Addala. Gopi Sundar composed the film score. The soundtrack was released at a launch event held on 14 April 2016 at JRC Convention Centre in Hyderabad. The music received mostly positive response.

== Release ==
During the film's pre-production stage, the makers planned to release Brahmotsavam on 21 October 2015, coinciding with the Dusshera festival, and also clashing Ram Charan' Bruce Lee: The Fighter, and Nandamuri Balakrishna's 99th film Dictator. However on early May, the makers planned for a release on Sankranthi (14 January 2016), since Babu was busy on the promotions of his film Srimanthudu. On 1 December 2015, the makers announced that the film will be scheduled for a release on the occasion of Ugadi (8 April 2016). But in January 2016, a new release date of 29 April 2016 was announced. In April 2016, the makers planned to push the release date on 6 May, and then to 13 May, until the makers finalised a release on 20 May 2016. In May 2016, the makers officially confirmed its scheduled release date.

The film received a U certificate from the Censor Board, without any cuts. On the opening day of its release, the makers planned to 5 shows across Telangana, and in majority of the theatres in Andhra Pradesh. The film was released in more than 250 screens in the United States, with a special premiere on 19 May 2015. Before the film's release, Babu had planned for a simultaneous release in Tamil, with the same title, and was speculated that Babu will dub for the Tamil version. However, there was no dubbed Tamil version for the film, which was being released on 20 May 2016. In July 2018, Bhadrakali Pictures bought the distribution rights of the film's Tamil dubbed version titled Anirudh, which was released in late 2018.

=== Distribution ===
The theatrical rights of Nizam region were sold to Abhishek Pictures for ₹16.20 crore (US$1.7 million). NVP Cinemas bought the rights of the film in Ceded for ₹9 crore (US$960,000). The Vizag rights were sold to SR Cinemas for ₹6 crore (US$640,000). Om Sri Manikanta Films and Aditya Films bought the rights for Godavari East and West for Rs. 4.80 crore ₹4.80 crore (US$510,000) and ₹4.20 crore (US$450,000). S Creations bought the Krishna rights ₹9 crore (US$960,000). Guntur rights were sold to SV Creations for ₹5.50 crore (US$590,000). Nellore distribution rights were bought by Bhaskar Reddy for ₹2.50 crore (US$270,000).

The entire theatrical rights in the Andhra Pradesh and Telangana region were sold for ₹51.50 crore (US$5.5 million). G7 Entertainers bought the distribution rights in Karnataka for ₹7 crore (US$750,000). Tamil Nadu theatrical rights were sold to SPI Cinemas for ₹1 crore (US$110,000). In other parts of India, the film made a business of ₹0.70 crore (US$75,000), before its release. Overseas rights were sold to Classis Entertainment for ₹13.20 crore (US$1.4 million).

The total pre-release business of the film stood up to ₹90.40 crore (US$9.7 million), with worldwide theatrical rights of ₹73.40 crore (US$7.8 million), inclusive of satellite and digital rights.

=== Marketing ===
The first look and teaser of the film was released on 1 January 2016, coinciding with the New Year's Day. Another teaser of the film was unveiled on the occasion of Ugadi, 8 April 2016, and received positive response. On 10 April 2016, the makers unveiled the motion poster and the audio release poster of the film. The film's theatrical trailer was released on 14 April 2016, and received positive response from audiences.

=== Home media ===
The television rights of the film were sold to Zee Telugu for a record sum of ₹17 crore (US$1.8 million), after the actor's previous film Srimanthudu registered the third-highest TRP rating for a Telugu film, influenced the price of the satellite rights. The television premiere of the film took place on 9 October 2016, and received a TRP rating of 7.52, during its first premiere.

== Reception ==
=== Critical reception ===
Y. Sunita Chowdary of The Hindu gave it a 2.5 out of 5 and stated "Brahmotsavam is a confident, grand and sublime title for a noble plot that has been given a superficial treatment. Any joy that comes from the hero or this story is only ephemeral." Critic Pranita Jonnalageda, writing for The Times of India gave 3 out of 5 stars stating "A montage of beautiful visuals (Rathnavelu's brilliance), lots of happy people, and frequent song and dance routines may be the perfect ingredients for a ‘brahmotsavam’, but the end result needn't necessarily be a good film." Suresh Kavirayani of Deccan Chronicle gave the same rating, saying "Brahmotsavam is extremely good on paper, but the execution is not interesting." Sify gave 2.75 out of 5 stating "Brahmotsavam has a grand theme but the director failed to narrate the movie in a convincing way as it is laced with tedious sequences and unending songs. Mahesh Babu's performance, rich production values and camera work works in this movie that has many issues." 123Telugu gave a positive review stating that "Brahmotsavam is a film which has some decent moments going its way. This is not your regular dance and fight movie and has simple emotions. Mahesh Babu's performance, family emotions and huge star cast are basic assets. If you ignore the predictable nature of the storyline and some boring moments during the second half, this is one film which can be easily watched with your family this summer."

India Today gave 2.5 out of 5 stars saying that "if Srikanth had chosen to stick with the genre 'family drama', the fate of Brahmotsavam would have been fine. But he chose to treat a feel-good road trip which has resulted in an absolutely chaotic screenplay". Behindwoods gave 2.5 out of 5 calling it a "hackneyed family drama that rides on the shoulders of Mahesh Babu!" Indiaglitz gave 3 out of 5 stating "A film that drives home the message that relationships must be celebrated." Writing for News18, Karthik Keramalu gave 2.5 out of 5 stating that "The nib of Sreekanth's ‘Brahmotsavam’ states that we're all a family. The problem is not that the nib is broken; the nib goes all over the place and it doesn't know where to stop and how to draw a picture that doesn't mumble black and white philosophies." Sreedhar Pillai, editor-in-chief for Firstpost stated "Brahmotsavam lacks a cohesive story and the way the film unfolds puts you into a deep slumber."

=== Box office ===
==== India ====
Brahmotsavam collected more than ₹17 crore (US$1.8 million) at the worldwide box office on the opening day of its release, with nearly ₹12.60 crore (US$1.3 million) crore from AP/Telangana box office. On the second day, the film's collection dropped due to mixed word-of-mouth, collecting ₹3.15 crore (US$340,000). Brahmotsavam grossed ₹42.63 crore in its first weekend worldwide with a share of ₹28.75 crore. The film collected nearly ₹9.10 crore on its weekdays and collected a total gross of ₹51.7 crore on its first week run worldwide and returned nearly 50% of its global share of ₹33.73 crore.

However the film's collection dropped down on the following days, with the film collecting nearly ₹9.74 crore on its 2nd weekend taking, the total collection to ₹61.44 crore worldwide on its 10 days with a share of ₹38.52 crore. By the end of its second week, Brahmotsavam had collected approximately ₹63.70 crore worldwide.

==== Overseas ====
The film was released on over 200 screens in the United States, during its special premiere on 19 May, where it collected $560,274. According to trade analyst Taran Adarsh, Brahmotsavam had collected $1,053,521 (₹7.12 crore), in the opening weekend, becoming Babu's fifth film to surpass the $1 million mark at the U.S. box office. The film collected more than $1,092,075 (₹7.31 crore), at the end of the first week, surpassing the lifetime collection of Sardaar Gabbar Singh (2016), at the US Box office, where it collected $1,070,130 (Rs. 7.12 crore). The film collected an estimated US$1.15 million after ten days, becoming the Babu's fourth highest-grossing film in US.
