= Mukunda (soundtrack) =

- Album cover

Soundtrack album by Mickey J. Meyer
- Released: 3 December 2014
- Recorded: 2014
- Studios: RMP, Hyderabad; Moksha Studios, Hyderabad; Rama Krishna Studios, Hyderabad; Inspire Studios, Hyderabad; Vault Mastering Studios, New York City
- Genre: Feature film soundtrack
- Length: 26:12
- Language: Telugu
- Label: Aditya Music
- Producer: Mickey J. Meyer

Mickey J. Meyer chronology
Chakkiligintha (2014)	Mukunda (2014)	Kerintha (2015)
External audio
- Official Audio Jukebox on YouTube

Mukunda is the soundtrack album composed by Mickey J. Meyer for the 2014 Telugu-language drama film of the same name starring Varun Tej, and Pooja Hegde in lead roles, directed by Srikanth Addala. The film marks Meyer's third collaboration with Srikanth after Kotha Bangaru Lokam (2008) and Seethamma Vakitlo Sirimalle Chettu (2013). The film featured seven tracks with lyrics written by Sirivennela Seetharama Sastry. The soundtrack album was released by Aditya Music on 3 December 2014. The release coincided with a promotional event held at the Shilpakala Vedika, Hyderabad.

The soundtrack received positive reviews from the critics, who were appreciative of the lyrics and Meyer's instrumentation in tune with the film's setting. Upon the release, the song "Gopikamma" topped the charts and increased the buzz for the film.

== Production ==
In February 2014, Mickey J. Meyer was selected to compose the film's soundtrack and background music. This marked his continuous third association with Srikanth Addala after Kotha Bangaru Lokam (2008) and Seethamma Vakitlo Sirimalle Chettu (2013). Sirivennela Seetharama Sastry penned the lyrics of all the songs. Audio rights were acquired by Aditya Music in mid August 2014.

== Composition ==
The first track "Chesededo" had the lyrics written by Sastry and was sung by Rahul Nambiar and L. V. Revanth. The second song "Daredumdadum" was sung by Anjana Sowmya and Mickey J. Meyer himself. Hegde praised the flute piece of the song. The next song "Chaala Bagundi" was recorded by Haricharan. K. S. Chithra lend her voice to the song "Gopikamma". The track "Arere Chandrakala" was sung by Karthik and Sai Shivani. Shweta Pandit gave her voice for the sixth song "Nandalaala". The theme track "Mukunda Theme" song was performed by Meyer himself.

== Marketing and release ==
The soundtrack was expected to be launched in September 2014 initially. The release was postponed to November 2014 and then to early December 2014. In late-November, the release date was later finalized as 3 December 2014. The makers released "Chesededo" song's teaser on 2 December 2014.

The film's songs were leaked online before its official release. The audio launch event was held on 3 December 2014 at Shilpakala Vedika, Hyderabad. K. Raghavendra Rao, Chiranjeevi, Allu Arjun, Sai Dharam Tej, Allu Aravind, Naga Babu, Padmaja, Varun Tej, Pooja Hegde, Srikanth Addala, Mickey J. Meyer and film's cast and crew were also present at the event. All the tracks were performed by Meyer and respective singers of the tracks.

== Music videos ==
Music videos were choreographed by Raju Sundaram. Varun Tej said "dance was a quite a challenge for me, but I think I have managed well". "Gopikamma" video song featuring Hegde was shot at ancient temple at Samarlakota, Andhra Pradesh. She said "we've shot in Bhimavaram, Kakinada and Amalapuram to name a few. Also I love the food served there and those beautiful girls in the village". Music video of "Daredumdadum", featuring Tej and Hegde was shot in early-September 2014, in Switzerland. While shooting the song in Switzerland, the entire unit got stuck in hailstorm. Although no one was injured.

== Track listing ==
All tracks are written by Sirivennela Seetharama Sastry.

Telugu
No.	Title	Singer(s)	Length
1.	"Chesededo"	Rahul Nambiar, L. V. Revanth	04:24
2.	"Daredumdadum"	Mickey J Meyer, Anjana Sowmya	03:55
3.	"Chaala Bagundi"	Haricharan	04:45
4.	"Gopikamma"	K. S. Chithra	04:21
5.	"Arere Chandrakala"	Karthik, Sai Shivani	03:26
6.	"Nandalaala"	Shweta Pandit	04:09
Total length:			26:12

All tracks are written by Viveka.

Tamil
No.	Title	Length
1.	"Veshum Pona"	04:24
2.	"Daredumdadum"	03:55
3.	"Yennil Vandhaale"	04:45
4.	"Gopivanedhey"	04:21
5.	"Arere Raakshasiye"	03:26
6.	"Nandalaala"	04:09
7.	"Mukunda Theme"
Total length:		26:12

Malayalam
No.	Title	Length
1.	"Karmam Cheyyum"	04:24
2.	"Daredumdadum"	03:55
3.	"Maayaaman Pole"	04:45
4.	"Gopike Nin"	04:21
5.	"Arere Chandrakala"	03:26
6.	"Nandalaala"	04:09
7.	"Mukunda Theme"
Total length:		26:12

All tracks are written by Raqueeb Alam.

Hindi
No.	Title	Length
1.	"Kehte He Kuch Bhi"	04:24
2.	"Daredumdadum"	03:55
3.	"Chaahaba Jisko"	04:45
4.	"Gopiyaan Ke"	04:21
5.	"Arere Chandrakala"	03:26
6.	"Nandalaala"	04:09
Total length:		26:12

== Reception ==
The soundtrack album received positive reviews from critics, praising Meyer's composition, and Sastry's lyrics.

Reviewing the soundtrack album, The Times of India stated that the soundtrack has some peppy and melodious tunes, calling "Dumdaredum" and "Chala Bagundi" as the best songs of the album. IndiaGlitz wrote "Mickey J Meyer's imprint is write over the album. It's a mix of melody and youthfulness. Sirivennela writes all the songs to a profound effect. Getting choicest of singers on board, Mickey delivers a music lover's album." Avad M of 123Telugu selected "Nandalaala" and "Chaala Bagundi" as the picks of the album and wrote "Mickey J Meyer once again proves that he is a class apart and provides a chart topping romantic album which is quite soothing and melodious". Reviewing the soundtrack, Karthik of Milliblog wrote "Chaala baagundi, with its brilliant vocal plus guitar interplay, is the soundtrack's best, with Haricharan proving his value again! Mickey on top of his game, again!". Jeevi of Idlebrain wrote "Background music by Micky J Meyer is nice. Songs carry his signature. A couple of duets (one foreign song and a set song) act as speedbreaker for narration." Suresh Kavirayani of Deccan Chronicle noted "Micky J. Mayer provided soothing music and a couple of songs have turned up very nicely."

== Impact ==
"Gopikamma" topping the charts had significantly helped the pre-release hype and buzz. K. S. Chithra won her 11th Nandi Award for Best Female Playback Singer for the song "Gopikamma", surpassing the S. Janaki's record.

== Accolades ==
Award	Year	Category	Recipient(s)	Result
Nandi Awards	2014	Best Female Playback Singer	K. S. Chithra (for "Gopikamma"	Won
CineMAA Awards	2014	Best Female Playback Singer Telugu	K. S. Chithra (for "Gopikamma"	Won
Santosham Film Awards	2014	Best Female Playback Singer Telugu	K. S. Chithra (for "Gopikamma"	Won
CineMAA Awards	2015	Best Female Playback Singer Telugu	K. S. Chithra (for "Gopikamma"	Won
South Indian International Movie Awards	2015	Best Female Playback Singer – Telugu	K. S. Chithra (for "Gopikamma"	Nominated
South Indian International Movie Awards	2015	Best Music Director – Telugu	Mickey J. Meyer	Nominated
South Indian International Movie Awards	2015	Best Lyricist – Telugu	Sirivennela Seetharama Sastry (for "Nandalala")	Nominated
