= SIIMA Award for Best Actor in a Negative Role – Telugu =

Telugu film award

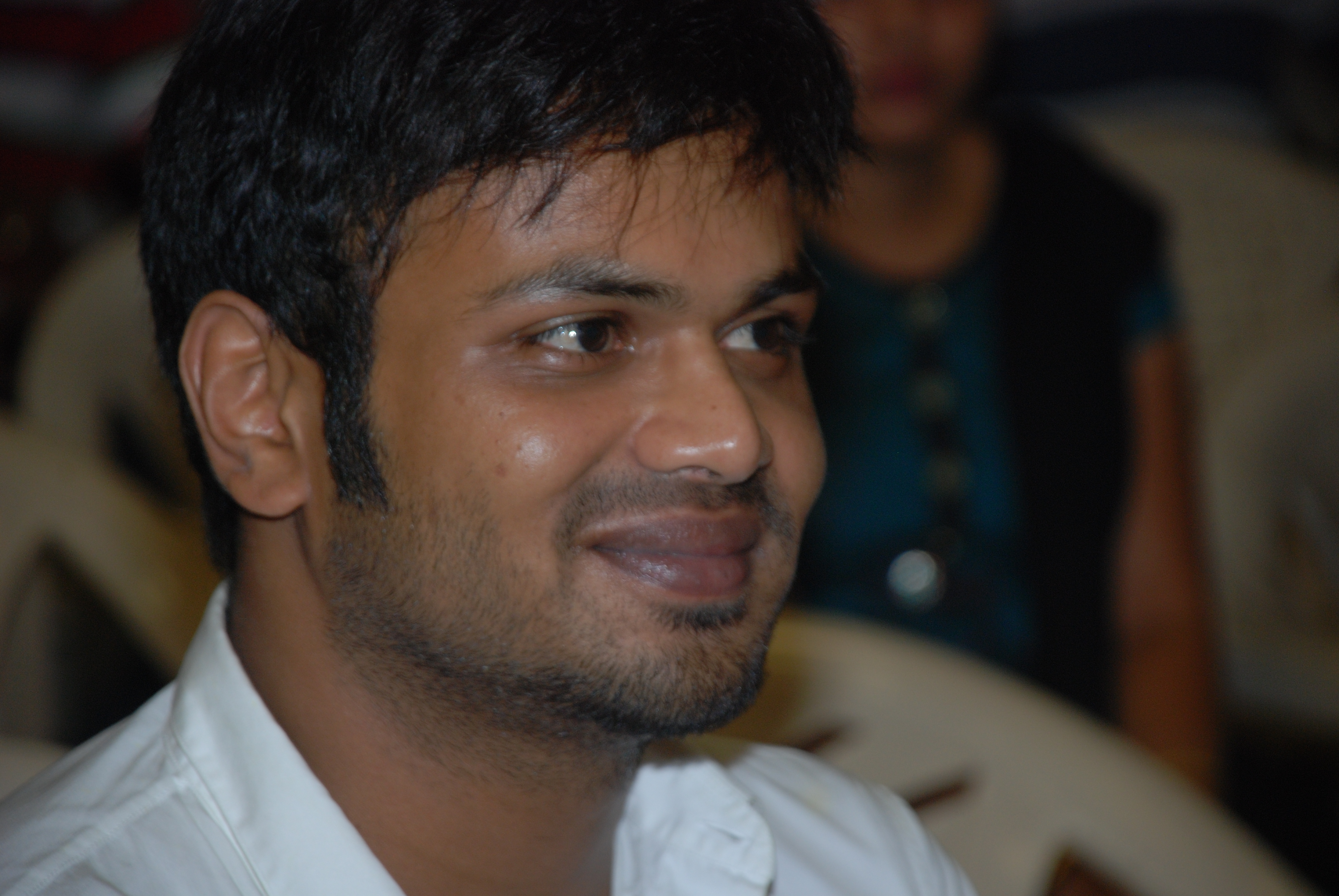
- The 2026 recipient: Manchu Manoj
- Awarded for: Best Performance by an Actor in an Antagonist/Negative Role in Telugu cinema
- Country: India
- Presented by: Vibri Media Group
- First award: 21 June 2012 (for films released in 2011)
- Most recent winner: Manchu Manoj, Mirai (2025)

Highlights
- Most wins: Jagapathi Babu and Rana Daggubati (2)
- Most nominations: Jagapathi Babu and Prakash Raj (4)

SIIMA Award for Best Actor in a Negative Role – Telugu is presented by Vibri media group as part of its annual South Indian International Movie Awards, for the best acting done by an actor in an antagonist / negative role in Telugu films. The award was first given in 2012 for films released in 2011.

== Superlatives ==
Categories	Recipient	Record
Most wins	Jagapathi Babu	2
Most wins	Rana Daggubati	2
Most nominations	Jagapathi Babu	4
Most nominations	Prakash Raj	4
Most nominations without a win	Prakash Raj	4
Oldest winner	Kamal Haasan	Age 70 (13th SIIMA)
Youngest winner	Kartikeya Gummakonda	Age 28 (9th SIIMA)
Oldest nominee	Kamal Haasan	Age 70 (13th SIIMA)
Youngest nominee	Kartikeya Gummakonda	Age 28 (9th SIIMA)

== Winners ==
Year	Actor	Film	Ref
2011	Lakshmi Manchu	Anaganaga O Dheerudu	
2012	Sudeepa	Eega	
2013	Sampath Raj	Mirchi	
2014	Jagapathi Babu	Legend	
2015	Rana Daggubati	Baahubali: The Beginning	
2016	Jagapathi Babu	Nannaku Prematho	
2017	Rana Daggubati	Baahubali 2: The Conclusion	
2018	Sarathkumar	Naa Peru Surya	
2019	Kartikeya Gummakonda	Nani's Gang Leader	
2020	Samuthirakani	Ala Vaikunthapurramuloo	
2021	Srikanth	Akhanda	
2022	Suhas	HIT: The Second Case	
2023	Duniya Vijay	Veera Simha Reddy	
2024	Kamal Haasan	Kalki 2898 AD	
2025	Manchu Manoj	Mirai	

== Nominations ==
- 2011: Lakshmi Manchu – Anaganaga O Dheerudu
  - Abhimanyu Singh – Bejawada
  - Kelly Dorji – Badrinath
  - Pradeep Rawat – Mangala
  - Sonu Sood – Kandireega
- 2012: Sudeepa – Eega
  - Abhimanyu Singh – Gabbar Singh
  - Nassar – Dhammu
  - Prakash Raj – Businessman
  - Sonu Sood – Julai
- 2013: Sampath Raj – Mirchi
  - Ashutosh Rana – Tadakha
  - P. Ravi Shankar – Ramayya Vasthavayya
  - Pradeep Rawat – Naayak
  - Shawar Ali – Iddarammayilatho
- 2014: Jagapati Babu – Legend
  - Madhusudhan Rao – Autonagar Surya
  - P. Sai Kumar – Yevadu
  - Ravi Kishan – Race Gurram
  - Rao Ramesh – Mukunda
- 2015: Rana Daggubati – Baahubali: The Beginning
  - Mithun Chakraborty – Gopala Gopala
  - Prakash Raj – Temper
  - Ravi Kishan – Kick 2
  - Sampath Raj – Srimanthudu
- 2016: Jagapathi Babu – Nannaku Prematho
  - Aadhi Pinisetty – Sarrainodu
  - Arvind Swamy – Dhruva
  - Kabir Duhan Singh – Supreme
  - Sharad Kelkar – Sardaar Gabbar Singh
- 2017: Rana Daggubati – Baahubali 2: The Conclusion
  - Arjun Sarja – Lie
  - Rao Ramesh – Duvvada Jagannadham
  - Tarun Arora – Khaidi No. 150
  - Vijay Varma – Middle Class Abbayi
- 2018: Sarathkumar – Naa Peru Surya
  - Jagapathi Babu – Rangasthalam
  - Jayaram – Bhaagamathie
  - Kunal Kapoor – Devadas
  - R. Madhavan – Savyasachi
- 2019: Kartikeya Gummakonda – Nani's Gang Leader
  - Jagapathi Babu – Maharshi
  - Regena Cassandrra – Evaru
  - Sonu Sood – Sita
  - Vivek Oberoi – Vinaya Vidheya Rama
- 2020: Samuthirakani – Ala Vaikunthapurramuloo
  - Jisshu Sengupta – Bheeshma
  - Nani – V
  - Prakash Raj – Sarileru Neekevvaru
  - Sunil – Colour Photo
- 2021: Srikanth – Akhanda
  - Samuthirakani – Krack
  - Siddharth – Maha Samudram
  - Sunil – Pushpa: The Rise
  - Vijay Sethupathi – Uppena
- 2022: Suhas – HIT: The Second Case
  - Jayaram – Dhamaka
  - Samuthirakani – Sarkaru Vaari Paata
  - Satyadev – Godfather
  - Unni Mukundan – Yashoda
- 2023: Duniya Vijay – Veera Simha Reddy
  - Arjun Rampal – Bhagavanth Kesari
  - Arvind Swamy – Custody
  - Prakash Raj – Waltair Veerayya
  - Shine Tom Chacko – Dasara
- 2024: Kamal Haasan – Kalki 2898 AD
  - Ajay – Pottel
  - Fahadh Faasil – Pushpa 2: The Rule
  - S. J. Suryah – Saripodhaa Sanivaaram
  - Vinay Rai – Hanu-Man
- 2025: Manchu Manoj – Mirai
  - Bobby Deol – Daaku Maharaaj
  - Dheekshith Shetty – The Girlfriend
  - Emraan Hashmi – They Call Him OG
  - Sivaji – Court: State vs a Nobody
