= Rao Ramesh =

Indian actor (born 1968)

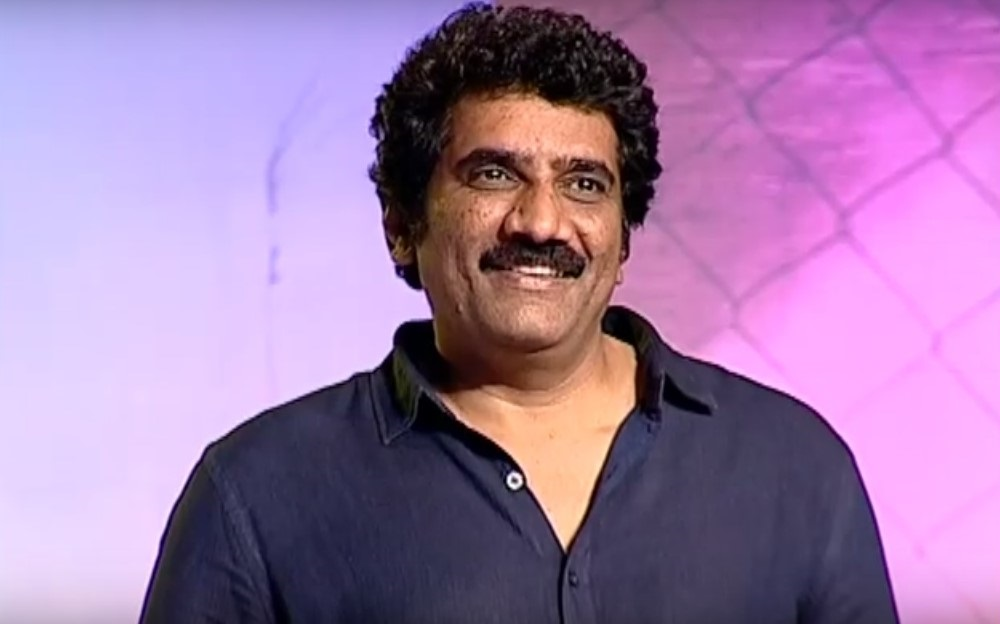
- Rao Ramesh at the success meet of Mukunda in December 2014
- Born: 25 May 1968 (age 58); Srikakulam, Andhra Pradesh, India
- Occupation: Actor
- Years active: 2000–present
- Parent: Rao Gopal Rao (father)

Rao Ramesh (born 25 May 1968) is an Indian actor who works primarily in Telugu cinema, theatre, and television apart from some Tamil films. He is the son of veteran actor Rao Gopal Rao. Rao Ramesh initially appeared in Seema Simham (2002) and Okkadunnadu (2007), before getting a breakthrough role in Krish's Gamyam (2008), portraying a reformed naxalite for which he received critical acclaim for his portrayal and the film went on to become one of the highest grossing Telugu films of the year.

His subsequent films, Kotha Bangaru Lokam (2008), Avakai Biryani (2008) and S. S. Rajamouli's Magadheera (2009) were box office hits, and his role in the latter as a hunchbacked old Tantric won him further acclaim. Throughout the early 2010s, Rao Ramesh became a popular supporting actor and described that by 2015, he was in the "best phase of his career".

== Early life ==
Rao Ramesh was born on 25 May 1968 to actor Rao Gopal Rao. He was brought up in Chennai. His initial schooling was from Sri Ramakrishna Mission School in T. Nagar and later completed a degree in Communications before getting into Still-photography. He later joined K. S. Prakasa Rao, a cinematographer and father of K. Raghavendra Rao, as an assistant before going to Bangalore to learn industrial photography.

== Early career ==
Rao Ramesh began acting in a television series directed by Ghantasala Ratna Kumar, but the production was shelved amidst schedules. He subsequently moved back to Chennai and started acting in soap operas such as Pavithra Bandham and Kalavari Kodalu, and shot for over 1000 episodes in the space of four and half years.

== Filmography ==
=== Telugu ===
Year	Title	Role	Notes
2002	Seema Simham	Hema's brother	
2007	Okkadunnadu	Man searching for Bombay Blood Group	
2008	Gamyam	Naxalite	
2008	Kotha Bangaru Lokam	Lecturer	
2008	Avakai Biryani	Masterji	
2008	Dongala Bandi		
2009	Fitting Master	Varun	
2009	Kick	Naina's uncle	
2009	Magadheera	Ghora	
2009	Villagelo Vinayakudu	Colonel Lakshmipati	
2010	Inkosaari	Revanth	
2010	Leader	Mavayya	
2010	Aakasa Ramanna	Ali	
2010	Varudu	Umesh Gupta	
2010	Maryada Ramanna	Broker	
2010	Shambo Shiva Shambo	Karna's friend	
2010	Sye Aata		
2010	Khaleja	Tantrik	
2011	Mirapakay	College principal	
2011	Seema Tapakai	Narsimha	
2011	Chattam	Prakash	
2011	Badrinath		
2011	Amayakudu	Krishna's uncle	
2011	Aakasame Haddu	College Principal	
2011	Pilla Zamindar	Military Rajanna	
2011	Solo	Gautham's foster uncle	
2011	Friends Book	Police Inspector	
2012	Gabbar Singh	Minister Pradeep Kumar	
2012	All the Best	Babji	
2012	Julai	ACP Raja Manikyam	
2012	Srimannarayana	Marthand Rao	
2012	Bus Stop		
2013	Seethamma Vakitlo Sirimalle Chettu	Geetha’s father	
2013	3G Love	Shanti's father	
2013	Shadow	Sivaji	
2013	Sukumarudu	SVR	
2013	Iddarammayilatho	Central Minister	
2013	Balupu	A. R. Naidu	
2013	Mallela Theeram Lo Sirimalle Puvvu	Lakshmi's father	
2013	Om 3D	Byrreddy	
2013	Anthaka Mundu Aa Tarvatha	Anil's father	
2013	Prema Oka Maikam	Vamshi	
2013	Attarintiki Daredi	Shekhar	TSR – TV9 National Film Award for Best Supporting Actor
2013	Doosukeltha	Sarweshwar	
2013	Ramayya Vasthavayya	CBI Officer Avinash	
2013	Kaalicharan		
2014	Kshatriya		
2014	Legend	Jaidev's uncle	
2014	Kotha Janta	Ramesh	
2014	Poga		
2014	Amrutham Chandamamalo	Chandu	
2014	Oohalu Gusagusalade	Venky's uncle	
2014	Geethanjali	Ramesh Rao	
2014	Race Gurram	Sekhar Chandra	
2014	Nee Jathaga Nenundali	Sravan	
2014	Karthikeya	Prudhvi Raj	
2014	Rabhasa	Raghava	
2014	Aagadu	Police Commissioner Ramachandra Rao	
2014	Rowdy Fellow	Asuragana Durga Prasad	
2014	Jump Jilani	Jewellery owner	
2014	Lakshmi Raave Maa Intiki	Sarvesh Anand Rao	
2014	Saheba Subramanyam	Police officer	
2014	Govindudu Andarivadele	Rajendra	
2014	Mana Kurralle		
2014	Mukunda	Municipal Chairman	Nominated–SIIMA Award for Best Actor in a Negative Role – Telugu
2015	Bandipotu	Seshagiri	
2015	Rey		
2015	S/O Satyamurthy	Pallavi's father	
2015	Dohchay	Chandu's father	
2015	Pandaga Chesko	Mr. Rai	
2015	Cinema Choopistha Mava	Somnath Chatterjee	
2015	Bruce Lee: The Fighter	Rama Chandra Rao	
2015	Mirchi Lanti Kurradu		
2015	Size Zero	Sweety's father	
2015	Sher	Raghuram	
2015	Bengal Tiger	Home Minister Nagappa	
2015	Tripura	Psychology professor	
2015	Shankaraabharanam	Badrinath Thakur	
2015	Where Is Vidya Balan	Dr. Harsha	
2016	Abbayitho Ammayi	Prardhana's father	
2016	Speedunnodu	Ramachandrappa	
2016	Sardaar Gabbar Singh	Ramesh Talwar	
2016	Brahmotsavam	Peddabbai	
2016	Srirastu Subhamastu	Jagannatham	
2016	A Aa	Pallam Venkanna	Nominated–Filmfare Award for Best Supporting Actor – Telugu
2016	Om Sai Ram		
2016	Hyper	Minister Rajappa	
2016	Jaguar	Dr. Ramachandran	
2016	Naanna Nenu Naa Boyfriends	Raghava Rao	
2017	Nenu Local	Bride's father	
2017	Om Namo Venkatesaya	Govindarajulu	
2017	Gunturodu	Krishna Rao	
2017	Katamarayudu	Narsappa	
2017	Keshava	Krishna Murthy	
2017	Duvvada Jagannadham	Royyala Naidu	Nominated–SIIMA Award for Best Actor in a Negative Role – Telugu
2017	Yuddham Sharanam	Murali Krishna	
2017	Raju Gari Gadhi 2	Parandhamaiah	
2018	EGO	Soundarajan	
2018	Agnyaathavaasi	Varma	
2018	Chalte Chalte	Santosh's father	
2018	Howrah Bridge	Rao Ramesh	
2018	Hyderabad Love Story	Gopal Rao	
2018	Ammammagarillu	P. K. Babu Rao	
2018	Chal Mohan Ranga	Ramesh	
2018	Bharat Ane Nenu	Head Constable Ramachandra	
2018	Naa Peru Surya	Surya's godfather	
2018	Raju Gadu	Anji	
2018	RX100	Vishwanadham	
2018	Saakshyam	Tagore	
2018	Devadas	Dr. Bharadwaj	
2018	Aravinda Sametha Veera Raghava	Krishna Reddy	
2018	Savyasachi	Dr. Rajan	
2018	24 Kisses	Murthy	
2019	Manmadhudu 2	Attharu Pushparaju	
2019	Operation Gold Fish	S.K. Sharma	
2019	Prashnista	Raghupathi	
2019	Mr. Majnu	Siva Prasad	
2019	Majili	Rama Chandra Rao	
2019	Yatra	K. V. P. Ramachandra Rao	
2019	Chitralahari	Lawyer Purushottam	
2019	Jersey	Lawyer	
2019	Maharshi	Chandrasekhar	
2019	1st Rank Raju	School Principal	
2019	Oh! Baby	Nani / Shekar	
2019	Oorantha Anukuntunnaru	Shivanaidu	
2019	90ML	Kshunaakar Rao	
2019	Venky Mama	MLA Pasupathi	
2019	Prati Roju Pandage	Anand Rao	
2020	Sarileru Neekevvaru	Raghava	
2020	Solo Brathuke So Better	Virat's uncle	
2021	A1 Express	Sports Minister Rao Ramesh	
2021	Sreekaram	Kesavulu	
2021	Narappa	Lawyer Varadarajulu	
2021	Tuck Jagadish	Devudu Babu	
2021	Seetimaarr	Kadiyam Brother	
2021	Maha Samudram	Gooni Babji	
2021	Akhanda	Raju	
2021	Pelli SandaD	Vashishta's father	
2021	Pushpa: The Rise	Bhoomireddy Siddappa Naidu	
2022	Bangarraju	Ramesh	
2022	Khiladi	Raja Shekhar	
2022	Bheemla Nayak	Nagaraju	
2022	Pakka Commercial	Vivek	
2022	Swathi Muthyam	Bala's father	
2022	Leharaayi	Meghana’s father	
2022	HIT: The Second Case	DGP Nageswara Rao IPS	
2022	Yashoda	Central Minister Giridhar	
2022	Dhamaka	Ramesh Reddy	Nominated–SIIMA Award for Best Supporting Actor – Telugu
2023	Das Ka Dhamki	Sanjay's uncle	
2023	Ravanasura	Home minister Mudi Reddy	
2023	Anni Manchi Sakunamule	Diwakar	
2023	Peddha Kapu 1	Satya Rangaiah	
2023	Extra Ordinary Man	Somasekhar	
2024	Guntur Kaaram	Pakka Rajagopal "Gopal" Narayana	
2024	Geethanjali Malli Vachindi	Ramesh Rao	
2024	Maruthi Nagar Subramanyam	Subramanyam	
2024	Pushpa 2: The Rule	Bhoomireddy Siddappa Naidu	
2024	Bachchala Malli	Kaveri's father	
2024	Naa Saami Ranga	Varadaraju	
2025	Mazaka	Venkata Ramana	
2025	HIT: The Third Case	DGP Nageswara Rao IPS	
2025	Sri Sri Sri Raja Vaaru	Krishnamurthy	
2025	Junior	Gopal	
2025	Andhra King Taluka	Simhadri	
2025	The Girlfriend	Bhooma’s father	
2026	Anaganaga Oka Raju	Pedapalem Bhupathi Raju	
2026	S Saraswathi	Chief Justice Uma Maheswar	
2026	Ustaad Bhagat Singh	Forest Officer Singaiah	
2026	Peddi	Subhadra Raju	
2026	Aadarsha Kutumbam House No: 47	DSP Bruhaspati	

=== Tamil ===
Tamil film performances
Year	Title	Role	Notes
2009	Kadhalna Summa Illai	Naxalite	
2010	Easan	Neethirajan	
2015	Inji Iduppazhagi	Sweety's father	
2016	Saagasam	Commissioner Rajamanikam	
2021	Jai Bhim	Attorney General Ram Mohan	
2022	Naai Sekar Returns	Max aka Meganathan	
2023	Chandramukhi 2	Guruji	
2024	Vettaiyan	DGP D. Shrinivas	
2024	Brother	Sivagurunathan IAS	
2025	Kiss	Marcus	

=== Kannada ===
Kannada film performances
Year	Title	Role	Notes
2016	Jaguar	Dr. Ramachandran	
2022	K.G.F: Chapter 2	Kanneganti Raghavan	
2025	Junior	Gopal	

=== Television ===
Year	Title	Role	Network	Language	Notes
2000–2003	Pavithra Bandam		Gemini TV	Telugu	
2003–2005	Jayam		ETV	Telugu	
2005	Nilavai Pudippom	Chidambaram	Raj TV	Tamil	
2006	Chellamadi Nee Enakku	Siva's father	Sun TV	Tamil	
2011	Kalavari Kodallu		Zee Telugu	Telugu	
