= Narappa =

2021 film directed by Srikanth Addala

- Official release poster
- Directed by: Srikanth Addala
- Screenplay by: Vetrimaaran
- Story by: Vetrimaaran
- Dialogues by: Srikanth Addala
- Based on: Asuran by Vetrimaaran Vekkai by Poomani
- Produced by: D. Suresh Babu; Kalaipuli S. Thanu
- Starring: Venkatesh; Priyamani; Karthik Rathnam; Vasishta N. Simha
- Cinematography: Shyam K. Naidu
- Edited by: Marthand K. Venkatesh
- Music by: Mani Sharma
- Production companies: Suresh Productions; V Creations
- Distributed by: Amazon Prime Video
- Release date: 20 July 2021
- Running time: 153 minutes
- Country: India
- Language: Telugu

Narappa (transl. Guardian of the people) is a 2021 Indian Telugu-language period action drama film written and directed by Srikanth Addala. It is remake of Vetrimaaran's Tamil-language film Asuran (2019) which is itself based on the novel Vekkai by Poomani. The film is produced by D. Suresh Babu and Kalaipuli S. Thanu under their respective banners Suresh Productions and V Creations. The film stars Venkatesh, Priyamani, Karthik Rathnam, and Vasishta N. Simha, while Nassar, Rao Ramesh, Rajeev Kanakala, Brahmaji, Ammu Abhirami, Aadukalam Naren and Karthik Rathnam plays the other important supporting roles.

Mani Sharma composed the film's music while cinematography and editing are performed by Shyam K. Naidu and Marthand K. Venkatesh respectively. Principal photography of the film started in January 2020 and was shot in Andhra Pradesh, Tamil Nadu and Telangana. Narappa premiered on 20 July 2021 on Amazon Prime Video.

== Plot ==
In the 1980s Anantapur district, a man and a boy are trekking across a river, carrying homemade bombs. In another part of the village, a woman, a man, and a young girl are also hiding from the police.

The narrator reveals in a flashback that the man is Narappa and the boy is his son Seenappa. The woman, man, and child are Narappa's wife, Sundaramma, her brother Basavaiah and daughter Bujjamma. They also had an older son called Munikanna. They are a family of farmers living in Ramasagaram. Narappa has a close relationship with his older son but is distant, almost abusive with Seenappa. Narappa is from a family of farmers.

Panduswamy is a landlord from Vadakoor (lit. northern village), who plans a cement factory with his youngest son Doraswamy and they need Narappa's 3 acres of land, to which the family is against selling, especially Munikanna. One day Sundaramma is attacked by Panduswamy's son Rangababu, to which Munikanna retaliates by severely injuring him and gets imprisoned. Consequently, Narappa pleads with Panduswamy to get Munikanna released, and he asks Narappa to prostrate before every male resident of the landlord's village as atonement, to reinforce the caste pride of Panduswamy. Once released, Munikanna comes to know of this event and in rage, Munikanna beats Panduswamy with a slipper. As revenge, Panduswamy orders his henchmen, led by a hunter Gampanna to kill Munikanna. They behead Munikanna and his nude headless body is dumped in the village. Sundaramma is heartbroken, and after a year, Seenappa is compelled to kill Panduswamy in revenge. Narappa witnesses the attack, and flees with his family. He takes Seenappa along with him and asks Basavaiah to flee with Sundaramma and daughter Bujjamma.

The film returns to the present. Gampanna is ordered by Doraswamy & Rangababu to find Narappa and Seenappa. He tracks them down, and almost kills Seenappa. Narappa defeats them all and when they recover, Narappa explains why he spared their lives.

Twenty years earlier, Narappa is the native of a different village and he is a village-famous moonshine brewer and trusted servant to Shankaraiah, a privileged caste landlord. One day, Narappa convinces Sankaraiah to employ Seenu, an unemployed youth belonging to Shankaraiah's caste, as a clerk. Narappa's brother Munnappa and Varadarajulu, a lawyer, are attempting to regain their poor farming community's land from privileged caste landlords who had seized it illegally. Narappa's family repeatedly fails to find a bride for him as he is a brewer. Frustrated Narappa's elder sister's daughter Kannamma, proposes to her uncle which he and the family accepts. Seenu slowly gains Shankaraiah's trust and becomes his mill accountant. Seenu's attitude towards Narappa changes as his caste pride kicks in. Once Seenu insults Narappa when he asks him to give Rs. 1 as loan under his account, from Sankaraiah's money, which was a usual practice. Narappa beats Seenu inside the mill, Sankaraiah intervenes and pacifies Narappa, and Seenu plans revenge. Meanwhile, Narappa gifts a pair of sandals to Kannamma. In tha area and time, sandals were considered as a luxury which only privileged caste people could use. The oppressed caste people used to walk barefoot. Noticing Kannamma wearing sandals, Seenu hits her and forces her to walk through the village with the sandals on her head. Narappa retaliates by hitting him with sandals in the middle of the village and ties him up but is reprimanded by Shankaraiah, whose real colours are revealed when he specifically states Seenu getting beaten up by Narappa is not the same as Narappa's caste girl being beaten up by Seenu. Humiliated and enraged Narapppa quits brewing and joins his brother in his movement. One night, before a meeting is conducted by Munnappa and Narappa, the news arrives that Adv. Varadarajulu is arrested, and Narappa is sent to get the documents authorizing the meeting. When he returns, Munappa has been killed by Seenu and Narappa's entire family, including Kannamma, and most of their caste village, has been burned alive in their huts along with Kannamma. Enraged, Narappa brutally kills Shankaraiah, Seenu, and their men.

After that, Narappa leaves the village and months later is found by Basavaiah, who taught him farming. He's also introduced to Sundaramma, who is not getting marriage proposals. Then, he narrates his story, and Sundaramma admires what he did for his family and expresses her willingness to marry Narappa. Narappa surrenders to the court with the help of Adv. Varadarajulu and is given a short-term penalty considering his crime was not premeditated and happened in the midst of a communal clash with mutual casualties. After serving his sentence, he marries Sundaramma. Seenappa is amazed at his father's past and starts to admire him. Narappa meets with his wife and daughter and reaches Varadarajulu for help who advises them to turn up to court the next day.

Doraswamy and Rangababu plan an ambush near the court premises and Narappa and Seenappa who realise this at the last moment, flee from the court premises without surrendering. Later villagers in Narappa & Basavaiah's village and villagers in Vadakkoor, arrange a peace meeting wherein Panduswamy promises to let go of Seenappa and Narappa if Narappa agrees to sell his land to Panduswamy. Narappa reluctantly sells his land to protect Seenappa from Panduswamy's family. However, Seenappa is abducted and tortured by Doraswamy & Rangababu, in direct violation of the agreement. At this point, the infuriated Narappa kills them and many of their henchmen. He and Seenappa sustain serious injuries. As Narappa and Seenappa are cornered and about to be killed, Basavaiah and their villagers arrive armed and defuse the situation.

In the end, it is revealed that the two villages agreed that the conflict should end to prevent a deadly village clash. Narappa's family has gathered in the court, and he has agreed to go to jail instead of Seenappa. He tells his son to study well and get a job, and that, unlike land and money, the privileged caste landlords can't seize their education. The film ends with Narappa smiling at his family as he enters the court.

== Cast ==
- Venkatesh as Narappa Reddy
- Priyamani as Sundaramma
- Karthik Rathnam as Munikanna Reddy, Narappa and Sundaramma's Elder Son, Seenappa's Elder Brother
- Vasishta N. Simha as Seenappa Reddy, Narappa and Sundaramma's Younger Son, Munikanna's Younger Brother
  - Rakhi as Young Seenappa
- Nassar as Shavkar Shankaraiah
- Rao Ramesh as Lawyer Varadarajulu
- Rajeev Kanakala as Basavaiah
- Ammu Abhirami as Kannamma, Narappa's Niece
- Rathika Rose as Narappa's Niece
- Brahmaji as Munappa, Narappa's Elder Brother
- Jhansi as Narrappa's sister
- Aadukalam Naren as Panduswamy
- Rakesh Velivela as Katappa
- Rajsekhar Aningi as Veeraiah
- Prabhakar as Gampanna
- Ramaraju as Inspector Thippiswamy
- Sritej as Rangababu
- Raj Deepak Shetty as Doraswamy
- Arundathi Aravind as Subbadasu
- Kadambari Kiran as Constable
- Racha Ravi as cobbler

== Production ==
=== Development and casting ===
In November 2019, Srikanth Addala confirmed that he would be directing Telugu remake of Asuran with Venkatesh playing the titular role. Title was revealed as Narappa in January 2020. The film marks the second collaboration of Venkatesh and Srikanth Addala after working in the 2013 family drama film Seethamma Vakitlo Sirimalle Chettu. Venkatesh plays the role of Narappa, belonging to an oppressed caste from Anantapuram, Andhra Pradesh. Similar to Asuran, Venkatesh plays a man of his mid-40s. Priyamani was cast as Sundaramma and Karthik Rathnam as Munikanna, playing Narappa's wife and elder son respectively.

=== Filming ===
Principal photography of the film began on 22 January 2020 at Paalturu village near Uravakonda in Anantapur district. First schedule was to be shot in Rayalaseema region for authenticity. The film team then moved to Tamil Nadu to film few action scenes, and completed it in the March 2020, before the COVID-19 lockdown in India. These scenes were shot under the supervision of action director Peter Hein at Kurumalai, Theri Kaadu (Teri dune complex), Tirunelveli and other areas of Tamil Nadu. Filming has been suspended in March 2020 due to COVID-19 pandemic. It was reported that the film's shooting will be resumed in October 2020. Later, it was confirmed that the filming will be resumed on 9 November 2020 in Hyderabad, with Venkatesh being part of the filming for five days. By the time, the film has completed 80% of the shooting. By the end of January 2021, the shooting was wrapped up. Venkatesh completed his part of dubbing in May 2021, during the second-wave lockdown.

== Themes and influences ==
Sangeetha Devi Dundoo felt that Narappa is a story of revenge and the leading man's transformation is reminiscent of Rajinikanth in Baashha (1995). The film explores various social issues in India, including caste discrimination and primarily shows the theme of "rich vs poor". The core plot of the film is influenced by the real-life Kilvenmani massacre that occurred in 1968 in Kizhavenmani village, Tamil Nadu.

== Music ==
Narappa

Soundtrack album by Mani Sharma
- Released: July 30, 2021
- Recorded: 2020–2021
- Studios: Mahati Recording Studio, Hyderabad
- Genre: Feature film soundtrack
- Length: 18:49
- Language: Telugu
- Label: Suresh Productions Music
- Producer: Mani Sharma

Mani Sharma chronology
Red (2021)	Narappa (2021)	Acharya
External audio
- Audio Jukebox on YouTube

Singles from Narappa
- 1. "Chalaaki Chinnammi" Released: 11 July 2021; 2. "Ooo Narappa" Released: 16 July 2021; 3. "Rage of Narappa" Released: 23 July 2021

After working as the film scorer in the film Seethamma Vakitlo Sirimalle Chettu (2013), this is the second time Mani Sharma, collaborating with Srikanth, and first time as the composer of soundtrack album. First single "Chalaaki Chinnammi" was released on 11 July 2021 through Suresh Productions Music label. The second single "Ooo Narappa" was released on 16 July 2021. Third single "Rage of Narappa" was released on 23 July 2021. The soundtrack album (jukebox) was released on 30 July 2021.

All music is composed by Mani Sharma.

Original Soundtrack
No.	Title	Lyrics	Singer(s)	Length
1.	"Chalaaki Chinnammi"	Ananta Sriram	Aditya Iyengar, Nutana Mohan	3:27
2.	"Ooo Narappa"	Ananta Sriram	Dhanunjay, Varam	3:41
3.	"Rage of Narappa" (Narakara Theme)	Ananta Sriram	L. V. Revanth, Sai Charan, Sri Krishna	4:01
4.	"Thalli Pegu"	Sirivennela Seetharama Sastry	Saindhavi	3:48
5.	"Ooru Natta"	Sirivennela Seetharama Sastry	Anurag Kulkarni	1:43
Total length:				18:49

== Release ==
The film was scheduled to release on 14 May 2021 but was postponed due to the second wave of the COVID-19 pandemic in India. On 29 June 2021, it was announced that film received U/A certification from Central Board of Film Certification. In July 2021, it was announced that the film would have its digital premiere on Amazon Prime Video on 20 July 2021, forgoing its theatrical release. About the film's release on Amazon Prime Video, producer Suresh Babu commented that "The film's core message is very powerful. It does not shy away from the truths. I am certain that it will impact in ways that no one would expect. I am incredibly happy that we are able to showcase our film to audiences across 240 countries and territories".

== Reception ==
On the review aggregator website Rotten Tomatoes, 100% of 6 critics' reviews are positive, with an average rating of 6.5/10.

Neeshita Nyayapati of The Times of India gave a rating of 3.5 out of 5 and wrote that "In this adaptation of Poomani’s acclaimed novel Vekkai, Srikanth Addala gets out of the comfort zone of his usually bright and happy family dramas." Writing for Cinema Express, Ram Venkat Srikar commented that "In all, Narappa is as faithful a remake can get; it is, perhaps, too immaculate for its own good. When the original is a film like Asuran, there is no way a remake can go wrong, and fittingly, Narappa, despite its shortcomings, is a welcome change in Telugu cinema."

Baradwaj Rangan of Film Companion stated that "The screenwriting in the film is cyclical: what happens in one generation finds an echo in the next. Narappa isn’t quite as good as Asuran but — on its own terms — it’s pretty good."

In contrast, Janani K of India Today cited that "Director Srikanth Addala’s Narappa is a faithful remake of Dhanush’s Asuran. However, it lacks the freshness and soul of Asuran." Praising the performances done by all the actors and work by the director, Shubham Kulkarni of Koimoi stated: "Did We Really Need A Scene-To-Scene Copy Of Asuran?" and added that "The remake is good but not equal to the brilliance the Dhanush starrer stood on." Sasidhar Adivi of Deccan Chronicle wrote, "Narappa works in parts as a dark and gripping drama. The storyline is old and predictable, but the performances and emotional trail make it a decent watch."
