= Peddha Kapu 1 =

- Directed by: Srikanth Addala
- Written by: Srikanth Addala
- Produced by: Miryala Ravinder Reddy; Miryala Sathyanarayana Reddy
- Starring: Virat Karrna; Pragathi Srivatsava
- Cinematography: Chota K. Naidu
- Edited by: Marthand K. Venkatesh
- Music by: Mickey J. Meyer
- Production company: Dwaraka Creations
- Release date: 29 September 2023
- Running time: 147 minutes
- Country: India
- Language: Telugu

Peddha Kapu 1 (transl. Big Caste) is a 2023 Indian Telugu-language action film written and directed by Srikanth Addala and produced by Miryala Ravinder Reddy and Miryala Sathyanarayana Reddy, under Dwaraka Creations. It features Virat Karrna, and Pragathi Srivatsava in the lead roles, with Rao Ramesh and Tanikella Bharani in supporting roles. The film received mixed to negative reviews from and critics and was a box office bomb.

== Plot ==
The film starts with Peddha Kapu a young man who fights against the injustices and atrocities committed by Bhaiyanna. He tries to stop him but to no avail. He then falls in love with Lakshmi the daughter of Satya Rangaiah, a kind hearted village president. One day Bhaiyanna gets ruthlessly murdered by an unknown person and the blame falls on Peddha Kapu. Who killed Bhaiyanna and how will Peddha Kapu find the killer forms the story. It is then revealed that Linga had killed Bhaiyanna as he had killed his parents when he was young over a land dispute. Peddha Kapu forgives him and makes him a police officer

== Cast ==
- Virat Karrna as Peddha Kapu
- Pragathi Shrivastav as Lakshmi
- Rao Ramesh as Satya Rangaiah
- Tanikella Bharani
- Nagendra Babu as TDP-in-charge
- Vikas Muppala as Linga
- Brigida Saga as Lakshmi
- Rajeev Kanakala
- Anasuya Bharadwaj as Akkamma
- Easwari Rao
- Aadukalam Naren as Bhaiyanna
- Srikanth Addala as Satya Rangaiah's son

== Reception ==
Sangeetha Devi Dundoo's review of Peddha Kapu 1 for The Hindu gives it 1/5 stars. Director Srikanth Addala's 'Peddha Kapu 1' attempts to depict the rise of a common man amidst class, caste, and power struggles but falls flat. While there are moments that show promise, the film ultimately becomes tedious and voyeuristic in its portrayal of violence, losing sight of character development. The excessive brutality and repulsive sexual violence detract from the potential of the story, leaving viewers disengaged. Despite some notable performances, the film's shortcomings make it a difficult watch, especially considering its intention to explore important social issues..

A critic from Telangana Today, in their review wrote that "Peddha Kapu 1 is definitely worth being on the list of the best political action drama movies in Telugu. There was Prasthanam once, there was Rangasthalam later, and today it is Peddha Kapu 1 that one shouldn’t miss watching in theatres despite looking at it as a small film".
