= Jaya Janaki Nayaka =

2017 Indian film by Boyapati Srinu

- Movie Poster
- Directed by: Boyapati Srinu
- Written by: Story & Screenplay: Boyapati Srinu; Dialogues: M. Rathnam
- Produced by: Miryala Ravinder Reddy
- Starring: Bellamkonda Sreenivas; Rakul Preet Singh; Pragya Jaiswal; Jagapathi Babu; R. Sarathkumar; Vani Viswanath
- Cinematography: Rishi Punjabi
- Edited by: Kotagiri Venkateswara Rao
- Music by: Devi Sri Prasad
- Production company: Dwaraka Creations
- Release date: 11 August 2017
- Running time: 149 minutes
- Country: India
- Language: Telugu

Jaya Janaki Nayaka (Hindi: जय जानकी नायक) is a 2017 Indian Telugu-language romantic action drama film directed by Boyapati Srinu and produced by Miryala Ravinder Reddy, under Dwaraka Creations. The film stars Bellamkonda Sreenivas and Rakul Preet Singh, alongside Pragya Jaiswal, Jagapathi Babu, Tarun Arora, Sarath Kumar, Nandu, Suman, Jayaprakash and Vani Viswanath. The music was composed by Devi Sri Prasad, while cinematography and editing were handled by Rishi Punjabi and Kotagiri Venkateswara Rao. It is the first movie in history to make 1B+ views on YouTube in single upload.

== Plot ==
Sweety, a college student, crosses paths with Gagan when he bravely defends her friend from harassment by Vikram Verma, the son of powerful Central Minister Jegannath Verma. This incident triggers a series of events that lead Sweety to Gagan's unconventional but close-knit family. Gagan lives with his father, Chakravarthy, and brother, Pruthvi. Their carefree lifestyle, involving alcohol, street food, and vigilantism, takes a turn when Sweety becomes a part of their lives. Sweety's influence inspires positive changes in their lifestyle, and even Chakravarthy embraces the transformation. As the story unfolds, Sweety learns about Pruthvi's love struggles and successfully reconciles the situation. Witnessing the happiness Sweety brings, Chakravarthy acknowledges her positive impact and urges Gagan to stand by her always.

Parallelly, a corporate tycoon, Ashwith Narayana Varma, driven by prestige, orchestrates a tragic incident involving his daughter's forbidden romance. The narrative introduces Arjun Pawar, a formidable liquor baron, and his brothers, who pose a threat to Narayana's business plans. Sweety and Gagan's love blossoms, but their happiness is short-lived when Sweety's father, JP, disapproves of Gagan due to his lifestyle and Chakravarthy's reputation. Gagan's attempt to win JP's approval ends in a violent confrontation, forcing Sweety to prioritize her father's safety over their relationship.

Heartbroken, Gagan faces a life-threatening accident, prompting Chakravarthy to send him away to Vizag for safety. Gagan encounters Falguni, his father's cousin, whose carefree lifestyle contrasts with Sweety's. Fate leads Gagan to a beach party, where he intervenes in an attack on Narayana's family by Arjun's brother. Gagan defeats Arjun's henchmen and saves Sweety's life, but he is shot and left for dead. With Narayana's help, Gagan survives and learns of the forced marriage plan between Sweety and Narayana's son, Veerendra. However, the wedding takes a tragic turn when Veerendra is killed by Arjun's men, leading to Sweety's captivity.

Facing a moral dilemma, JP is coerced into letting Sweety go, as she is left widowed and without family ties. Gagan, determined to protect Sweety, discovers a secret deal between Narayana's sister and Arjun. As Narayana's family performs a ritual at the Hamsala Devi river, they are ambushed by Arjun's men.

In a ferocious fight, Gagan, Chakravarthy, and Pruthvi rescue Sweety, eliminating the threat. Narayana's prestige suffers, and the story takes a darker turn as he allies with Arjun with the help of Central Minister to eliminate Gagan once and for all. In a party, Chakravarthy and Pruthvi are gravely injured, Sweety is kidnapped again, Gagan finds about Sweety's kidnap, Gagan fights off with Arjun and Narayana's men and Gagan emerges victorious.

Gagan confronts Narayana, revealing the cost of his alliance with Arjun, leading to Narayana's tragic demise.and kills Arjun. Gagan and Sweety reunite amidst the chaos, marking the end of their tumultuous journey.

== Cast ==
- Bellamkonda Sreenivas as Gagan Chakravarthy, Sweety's love interest
- Rakul Preet Singh as Sweety/ Janaki, Gagan's love interest and JP's daughter(voice dubbed by haritha)
- Pragya Jaiswal as Falguni (second lead)
- Jagapathi Babu as Aswith Narayana Varma
- Sarath Kumar as Chakravarthy, Gagan's father
- Suman as Central Minister Jegannadh Verma
- Tarun Arora as Arjun Pawar
- Nandu as Pruthvi Chakravarthy, Gagan's brother
- Jayaprakash as JP, Sweety's father
- Shashank as Veerendra Varma, Narayana's son
- Sravan as Arjun's brother
- Vani Viswanath as Narayana's sister
- Sithara as Narayana's wife
- Chalapathi Rao as Satyam
- G. V. Sudhakar Naidu as Inspector
- Dhanya Balakrishna as Sweety's friend
- Ester Noronha as Manasa, Prudhvi's wife
- Sivannarayana Naripeddi as Sivannarayana, Prudhvi's father-in-law
- Rupa Lakshmi
- Bharani as Narayana's brother
- Prabhu as Lecturer
- Amulya as Amulya
- Srikanth kavuturi as Gagan's friend
- Chitti
- Catherine Tresa in item number "A For Apple"

== Soundtrack ==
Jaya Janaki Nayaka

Soundtrack album by Devi Sri Prasad
- Released: 4 July 2016
- Recorded: 2016
- Genre: Soundtrack
- Length: 27:08
- Label: Junglee Music
- Producer: Devi Sri Prasad

Devi Sri Prasad chronology
DJ (2016)	Jaya Janaki Nayaka (2016)	Jai Lava Kusa (2016)

The music was composed by Devi Sri Prasad. Music released on Junglee Music.

Original (Telugu)
No.	Title	Lyrics	Singer(s)	Length
1.	"Andhamaina Seethakoka Chiluka"	Ramajogayya Sastry	Sooraj Santhosh	1:43
2.	"Let's Party All Night"	Sri Mani	Prudhvi Chandra, M. M. Manasi	4:11
3.	"Rangu Rangu Kallajodu"	Sri Mani	Hema Chandra, Sravana Bhargavi	4:27
4.	"Nuvvele Nuvvele"	Chandra Bose	Swetha Mohan	4:29
5.	"Just Chill Boss"	Sri Mani	M. M. Manasi, Deepak	4:11
6.	"Veede Veede"	Sri Mani	Kailash Kher	4:20
7.	"A for Apple"	Sri Mani	Mamta Sharma, Sagar	3:47
Total length:				27:08

Hindi Track-List
No.	Title	Length
4.	"Aaja Re Aaja Re"	01:21
7.	"A For Apple"	03:47
Total length:		05:08

== Production ==
=== Development ===
Bellamkonda Suresh selected director Boyapati Srinu to direct his son Bellamkonda Sreenivas' third film. It was confirmed by the director later when the script work was in its final stages. The film was officially launched at Annapurna Studios in Hyderabad on 27 August 2014. Devi Sri Prasad was declared as the music director, Arthur A. Wilson was declared as the cinematographer, A. S. Prakash was declared as the art director while the story and dialogues were written by M. Rathnam. The film was said to be on the lines of Boyapati Srinu's debut film Bhadra and the script work was complete by then. Nallamalupu Bujji was reported to replace Bellamkonda Suresh as the film's producer due to the latter's financial crisis. However, Sreenivas confirmed that his father would produce the film and it has been delayed due to story discussions but not due to financial problems.

=== Casting ===
Early reports said that Shruti Haasan would be selected as the female lead of the film. However, in a press meet, Bellamkonda Suresh said that the female lead is yet to be finalized and discussions are going on. Tamannaah was selected as the female lead who said that her role was well written, unique and something she never did in her earlier films. On the day of launch, Boyapati Srinu said that another heroine will act in a guest role. Reports in mid-October 2014 suggested that Tamannaah may opt out of the film as she has to accommodate dates for Baahubali and for a Tamil film. In early November 2014, it was known that Sreenivas is working on his body language and would sport a new look for the film.

Due to the halt in the project, the search for the female lady began in January 2016 and it was reported that makers are keen on signing Shruti Haasan or Rakul Preet Singh. On 17 January 2016 it was confirmed that Rakul Preet Singh was signed in as a female lead on paying her an amount of ₹1.50 crore (US$160,000). Pragya Jaiswal was cast as the second female lead.

=== Filming ===
The makers planned to start the regular shooting in early November 2014. In early November 2016, the filming was announced to start in December 2016 once Sreenivas undergoes the transformation envisioned by Boyapati Srinu.

The principal photography began in mid-November 2016.

After a much delay of two years the shooting commenced in November 2016.

== Release ==
It was released on 11 August 2017.

The film was also dubbed into Hindi as Jaya Janaki Nayaka - Khoonkhar and premiered on Zee Cinema on 7 July 2018 and later dubbed in Malayalam as Njan Gagan and premiered on Flowers TV. The movie was also released on YouTube by the channel Pen Movies, which has reached 1 billion views as of 2026 and has become the most watched Indian movie on YouTube.

=== Home media ===
Star Maa acquired the rights of Jaya Janaki Nayaka. This movie first aired in TV on 26 November 2017.
