= Madhire Ravinder Reddy =

Indian producer

Madhire Ravinder Reddy is an Indian businessman and film producer working primarily in Telugu cinema. He is the founder of Dwaraka Creations, a major film production house in the Telugu film industry. He is known for his collaborations with Boyapati Srinu.

Ravinder Reddy started his film career producing the 2016 romantic thriller Sahasam Swasaga Sagipo (2016), followed by Jaya Janaki Nayaka (2017), the major cult blockbuster Akhanda (2021), and Peddha Kapu 1 (2023). His latest production is Hotel Beautifool.

== Hotel Beautifool ==
Hotel Beautifool is based on the popular Hindi play Baat Baat mein Bigdey haalaat, written and directed by Sameer Iqbal Patel. Patel was planning to make it into a film when Mohammed Aslam Shaikh and Madhire Ravinder Reddy saw the play and decided to join with Patel in making it into a Hindi feature film. The film stars Rejith Menon, Johny Lever, Brijendra Kala, Jia Sharma, Shaanti, Sagarika Chettri, Vishavpreet Kaur, Alisha Farrer, Imam Siddique and Sandeep Ghosh.

The first shoot started at Mumbai's future studio on 20 July 2014 and completed on 29 July. The second shoot ran from 27 September 2014 in Morjim, Goa.
