= Sahasam Swasaga Sagipo =

2016 film by Gautham Menon

- Theatrical release poster
- Directed by: Gautham Vasudev Menon
- Written by: Story and Screenplay: Gautham Vasudev Menon; Dialogues: Kona Venkat
- Produced by: Miryala Ravinder Reddy
- Starring: Naga Chaitanya; Manjima Mohan; Baba Sehgal
- Cinematography: Dan Macarthur; Dani Raymond; Theni Eswar
- Edited by: Anthony Gonsalvez
- Music by: A. R. Rahman
- Production companies: Dwaraka Creations; Ondraga Entertainment
- Release date: 11 November 2016
- Country: India
- Language: Telugu
- Budget: ₹25 crore

Sahasam Swasaga Sagipo (transl. Live life adventurously) is a 2016 Indian Telugu-language romantic action thriller film written and directed by Gautham Vasudev Menon. It was produced by Miryala Ravinder Reddy, under Dwaraka Creations. The film stars Naga Chaitanya and Manjima Mohan.

The plot follows a happy-go-lucky young man who is in love. However, in an unexpected turn of events, he and his dear ones are embroiled in a high-risk situation, which demands that he rise to the occasion and stand his ground against the odds. A Tamil version titled Achcham Yenbadhu Madamaiyada was simultaneously shot, with a different cast. The film features music composed by A. R. Rahman. This film's title is based on a song from Okkadu (2003).

The film was released on 11 November 2016, two days after demonetisation, to mixed reviews from critics.

== Plot ==
The reel opens with the snapshots of Rajinikanth Muralidhar (Naga Chaitanya) in a small brawl with a mob which later reveals that he had been quarrelling with the men for talking bad about his sister Maithrei.

Rajinikanth, who is hesitant to reveal his name (as he is the namesake of the legendary actor), is an MBA student and bike enthusiast, accompanied by his close friends Mahesh, Shyam, Srikanth and auto driver Selvam. One evening Rajinikanth goes to a person who is torturing his sister to love him back, and a fight happens between them when Mahesh spends time with his girlfriend Divya in their area. Somehow all things falls, and a few days passed by, and Rajinikanth says that he is now confident to handle any situation that comes in his life, and he is ready to face them.

Rajinikanth is now grown up a little, and he has 2 love stories that revolved around him in the past, one is Sukanya, and another is Mallika, and now he considers his new Thunderbird bike as his first love ever. At this moment, he comes to meet Leela (Manjima Mohan), a friend of his sister Maithrei who stays in Rajinikanth's house to complete their course, and Rajinikanth falls in love with her, they both speak for a long time in their house day and night, and Rajinikanth narrates his love story with Leela with his friends daily.

Now Rajinikanth plans for a bike long trip to Kannyakumari along with his friend Mahesh, but eventually, he is accompanied by Leela instead of Mahesh, they go to Kannyakumari via Chennai, Salem and Trivandrum. On the trip, they go to a rural village and stay for a night where they are taking care of by a kind-hearted villager (Madurai Mohan). The next day they reach Kannyakumari and see the Sunrise, here Leela falls for Rajinikanth, and after the trip, Rajinikanth agrees to drop Leela to her home in Kolhapur. On the way to Maharastra in a busy highway, they meet with a terrible accident he injures and breaks his shoulder at the same day Leela's parents are attacked in Maharashtra.

They feel something was wrong, and that wasn't an accident. The same day, Leela's parents were injured, and her Father doesn't seem to get alive again. They come to know that it was a plan to kill Leela, now Rajinikanth comes to the hospital, and his friend Mahesh accompanies him, now enters a violent action space in Rajinikanth's life, and he decides to save Leela and her family.

However, things take a turn for the worse as they encounter something unexpected. The second half is a well furnished, racy, clearly dispenses the fearless-ness to destroy the corrupt Politician, Police Officer Kamat (Baba Sehgal) and a gangster Hiren (Daniel Balaji). Kamat is the one who does unwanted things to kill Raman and his wife. Also, Mahesh is killed in this process. Kamat now tries to trace out Rajinikanth even in Mahesh's funeral, and finally, he reaches Rajinikanth's house where he is revealed that he is Rajnikanth Muralidhar IPS, who attains his posting as the Deputy Commissioner of Police in the same Kolhapur, where Leela's parents were killed. Finally, he assassinates Kamat and goes on a trip to Kanyakumari again with Leela with a beautiful proposal.

== Cast ==
- Naga Chaitanya as DCP Rajinikanth Muralidhar IPS
- Manjima Mohan as Leela (Voice dubbed by Chinmayi)
- Rakendu Mouli as Mahesh
- Baba Sehgal as Inspector Kamath
- Daniel Balaji as Hiren
- Anjali Rao as Maithrei
- Mathew Varghese as Muralidhar, Rajinikanth's father
- Sujata Panju as Rajinkanth's Mother
- Krrish as Atul
- Prasad Athalye as Dr. Yashwant Tripude
- Priya Rajkumar as Anamika
- Nagineedu as Sathyamoorthy
- Vasanthaa as Leela's mother
- Rishabh as Thambey
- Chalakudy Sunil as Maharashtra cop
- Vishwanath P U as Nathuram Dubey
- K K Menon as Somnath Naik
- Samragni as young Anamika
- R Shyam as Shyam
- Santosh Krishna as Srikanth
- R. S. Karthik as Auto Selvam
- R. N. R. Manohar as Mahesh's father
- Dollyann Santhosh as Sukanya
- Anandhi as Mallika
- Saran Bhaskar as Maithrei's stalker
- Shamhavy Gurumoorthy as Rajinkanth's younger sister
- Madurai Mohan as Villager
- Jaydev Subramaniam as Hospital receptionist
- Samson T Wilson as Hospital gangster
- Elyas Khan as Hospital gangster
- Chandrasekharan B as Doctor
- Sunitha Ojha as Nurse
- Bullet Babu as Ambulance driver
- S Sayath as a Taxi driver
- Khaleel L as Maharashtra cop
- Anil Bala as Maharashtra cop
- Birlaa Bose as Chennai cop
- Prayas Mann as Maharashtra cop
- Sathish Krishnan a cameo appearance in "Shokilla" song
- Gautham Vasudev Menon in a cameo appearance as Police Officer

== Soundtrack ==
Sahasam Swasaga Sagipo

Soundtrack album by A. R. Rahman
- Released: 17 June 2016
- Genre: Feature film soundtrack
- Language: Telugu
- Label: Aditya Music
- Producer: A. R. Rahman

A. R. Rahman chronology
24 (2016)	Sahasam Swasaga Sagipo (2016)	Pelé: Birth of a Legend (2016)
External audio
- Official Audio Jukebox on YouTube

The soundtrack album consists of five songs composed by A. R. Rahman. His original compositions for the Tamil version were retained without any change in the Telugu version. The Telugu lyrics are penned by Ananta Sriram, Rakendu Mouli, Krishna Chaitanya, and Sreejo.

Track list
No.	Title	Writer(s)	Singer(s)	Length
1.	"Shokilla"	Rakendu Mouli	Aditya Rao, ADK, Sri Raskol, Rakendu Mouli	4:38
2.	"Kannulla Munde"	Krishna Chaitanya	Haricharan, Chinmayi	3:38
3.	"Chakori"	Ananta Sriram	Sathya Prakash, Shashaa Tirupati	5:38
4.	"Taanu Nenu"	Ananta Sriram	Vijay Prakash	4:13
5.	"Vellipomaakey"	Sreejo	Sid Sriram, Dinesh Kanagaratnam	4:26
Total length:				21:56

== Release ==
The movie was released on 11 November 2016.

== Reception ==
=== Box office ===
Sahasam Swasaga Sagipo collected a total gross of ₹3.90 Crores and a share of ₹2.04 Crores worldwide on the first day of its release, its business was affected by Govt's ban on notes with the denomination of Rs 500 and Rs 1,000.

In the first weekend movie collected a total gross of ₹10 Crores and share of ₹5.15 Crores worldwide, and at US box office movie collected a total gross of $235,048.

=== Critical reception ===
The Times of India gave 3.5 out of 5 stars stating, "If you can survive an unusual narrative for a plot that will unfold only at the climax, Saahasam… could be a good pick. The story in itself is good, and the direction, cinematography and music add a great deal to it. It’s a movie you should watch for the feels". Sangeetha Devi Dundoo of The Hindu 3.5 out of 5 stars stating "Sahasam Swasaga Sagipo is worth a watch for some terrific moments". Suhas Yellapantula of The New Indian Express 3 out of 5 stars stating "A love story-turned-suspense thriller has a bit of everything in it.".

Suresh Kavirayani of Deccan Chronicle 3 out of 5 stars stating "A perfect mixture of romance and action. Gautam showcases his skills once again with a mix of romance and action. From then on wards, the movie is a typical Gautam Menon thriller.". IndiaGlitz 3 out of 5 stars stating "A shoot-out drama and a love story, 'SSS' comes with a narration that makes for a good watch. It may not be gripping in the same degree throughout, but the believable stunts, characterizations, and the technical departments ensure you are not bored.".

== Accolades ==
Filmfare Awards South

- Nominated - Best Music Director – Telugu - A. R. Rahman
- Nominated - Best Lyricist – Telugu - Anantha Sreeram – "Thaanu Nenu"
- Nominated - Best Male Playback Singer – Telugu - Vijay Prakash – "Thanu Nenu"

SIIMA Awards

- Nominated - Best Male Playback Singer (Telugu) - Sid Sriram – "Vellipomakey"

== Legacy ==
The song "Vellipomakey" inspired a film of the same name starring Vishwak Sen.
