= Akhanda =

2021 Indian film by Boyapati Srinu

- Theatrical release poster
- Directed by: Boyapati Srinu
- Written by: Story & Screenplay: Boyapati Srinu; Dialogues: M. Rathnam
- Produced by: Miryala Ravinder Reddy
- Starring: Nandamuri Balakrishna; Pragya Jaiswal; Jagapathi Babu; Srikanth
- Cinematography: C. Ramprasad
- Edited by: Kotagiri Venkateshwara Rao; Tammiraju
- Music by: Thaman S
- Production company: Dwaraka Creations
- Release date: 2 December 2021
- Running time: 169 minutes
- Country: India
- Language: Telugu
- Budget: ₹60–70 crore (Note: While The Hans India estimates the budget as 60 crore, The News Minute and Sakshi Post report it as 70 crore.)
- Box office: est.₹150 crore

Akhanda (transl. Undivided) is a 2021 Indian Telugu-language fantasy action drama film co-written and directed by Boyapati Srinu. It was produced by Miryala Ravinder Reddy, under Dwaraka Creations. It stars Nandamuri Balakrishna in a dual role alongside Pragya Jaiswal, Jagapathi Babu and Srikanth. The film featured original score and soundtrack was composed by Thaman S. In the film, twin brothers Akhanda and Murali Krishna are separated at birth. They grow up to lead completely separate lives, Murali as a local hero, and Akhanda as a secluded Shiva devotee. But when the lives of Murali and his family are in danger, his long-lost brother finally returns.

Released on 2 December 2021, Akhanda opened to mixed reviews from the critics and positive response from audience. The film became a success, grossing over ₹150 crore worldwide, emerging as the third highest-grossing Telugu film of the year and the highest-grossing film in Balakrishna's career then. Akhanda was featured at the 53rd International Film Festival of India in the Indian Panorama mainstream section.

Akhanda won the Telangana state Gaddar Award for Second Best Feature Film. A sequel, titled Akhanda 2, was released on 12 December 2025.

== Plot ==
In a dense, impenetrable forest, the Indian Army hunts a feared brigand named Gajendra Sahu. During a violent encounter, Gajendra is gravely injured but is rescued by the head of a spiritual organization called Maha Rudra Peetam. The chieftain preaches that God exists in nature and that it must be protected at all times. However, people blindly worship the chieftain more than the truth he represents. Angered by this hypocrisy, Gajendra kills the chieftain and his followers and begins exploiting nature for personal gain. Before dying, the chieftain warns him never to challenge fate, the Creator, and the universe.

At the same time in Anantapur, a couple, Ramachandraiah and Dharani, are blessed with twin sons, one of whom is stillborn. An Aghora appears and reveals that one child represents nature, while the other is a destructive force born of Shiva's wrath. He takes the stillborn child to Kashi, where the child miraculously comes back to life in a temple and is raised by Aghoras.

Years later, Murali Krishna, the surviving twin, becomes a powerful and respected arbitrator who works to eliminate factionalism and bring prosperity to the region. Saranya Bachupally, a newly appointed District Collector, clashes with Murali at first but soon falls in love with him after understanding his ideals. Meanwhile, Varadarajulu, a ruthless gangster, runs illegal uranium mining operations in a protected forest, exploiting workers under inhumane conditions. Gajendra Sahu supports Varadarajulu's operations. Saranya orders Principal Secretary Padmavati to conduct a secret investigation into these illegal activities.

Murali and Saranya marry and have a baby girl. Soon, children in the region start falling mysteriously ill, and doctors fail to find the cause. Padmavati uncovers the truth about Varadarajulu's uranium mining and warns Murali that the entire region will become a graveyard if it is not stopped. Murali confronts Varadarajulu, but his associate, Central Minister Bharat Reddy, intervenes. Gajendra plants a bomb at the hospital, killing several people, including Bharat Reddy. Murali is falsely implicated and arrested by NIA officer Krishnamacharya Perumal.

When Murali's own daughter falls sick, Saranya rushes her to a hospital. On the way, Varadarajulu's men attack her. While escaping, she enters an ancient cave temple where she encounters Akhanda Rudra Sikandar Aghora, Murali Krishna's elder brother, who possesses supernatural powers and is on a mission to restore sacred temples. Akhanda saves Saranya, revives the baby, and protects them. Gajendra, realizing Akhanda's divine power, begins to fear him.

Varadarajulu's brother, DSP Ranjan, captures Saranya and Murali's family, but Akhanda intervenes, kills the corrupt officers, and warns Gajendra by throwing Ranjan's dead body at him. Dharani, the twins’ mother, learns the truth about her sons and tries to reunite with Akhanda, but he declares that he has dedicated his life to God. Though detached, Akhanda develops a deep affection for Murali's child.

Akhanda later discovers that Padmavati has been brutally tortured and raped by Varadarajulu for exposing the mining scam. Enraged, Akhanda attacks the mining site, defeats Varadarajulu's forces, and frees the enslaved workers. Krishnamacharya also learns of Murali's innocence and clears his name. Desperate, Gajendra seeks help from a tantric named Prachanda to kill Akhanda.

They cast a deadly curse on Murali's child. To counter it, Akhanda begins a sacred Maha Mrityunjaya Homam, as advised by Kedari Aghori Baba. While performing the ritual, Akhanda is attacked by Gajendra and Prachanda, but he endures the pain and completes it with Murali's help. Empowered by Lord Shiva, Akhanda destroys both Gajendra and Prachanda. After restoring balance, he leaves, promising Murali's child that he will return whenever they need him again.

== Cast ==
- Nandamuri Balakrishna in a dual role as
  - Akhanda Rudra Sikandar Aghora
  - Bala Murali Krishna
- Pragya Jaiswal as Saranya Bachupally IAS, Murali's wife
- Jagapathi Babu as Aghora Baba
- Srikanth as Anthapuram Varadarajulu, the owner of the copper mining
- Nithin Mehta as Gajendra Sahu
- Poorna as Padmavathi IAS, Principal Secretary
- Avinash as Ramachandriah; Akhanda and Murali's father
- Viji Chandrasekhar as Dharani, Akhanda and Murali's mother
- Sharath Lohitashwa as Krishnamacharya Perumal, an NIA officer
- Suresh Chandra Menon as Jagajith Chauhan, a businessman
- Subbaraju as Central Minister A. Bharath Reddy
- Prabhakar as DSP Ranjan, Varadarajulu's younger brother
- Sravan as Varadarajulu's youngest brother
- Ayyappa P. Sharma as Prachanda, an evil Tantrik
- Naga Mahesh as Rajappa
- Chammak Chandra as Murali's fan
- Baby Deshna Javaji as Janani, Saranya and Murali's daughter

== Production ==
=== Development ===
The film marks the third collaboration between Balakrishna and Boyapati Srinu after Simha (2010) and Legend (2014). It was formally launched at a private event held at Hyderabad in December 2019. The film was tentatively titled as BB3 and NBK106. In April 2021, the film's official title was unveiled as Akhanda.

=== Cast and crew ===
Sayyeshaa was cast for the film for an undisclosed role in November 2020. Later, she left the project due to an unknown reason. It was also reported that Anjali will be part of the film. In March 2021, it was also reported that the action director duo Ram-Laxman has left the film after working for few action scenes. They were later replaced by Stunt Silva. Speaking to the media, in December 2021, Siva told that "I allocated 80 days for 'Akhanda'. Of them, up to 65 days went into mounting action sequences. The rest of the days went into discussing with the director how to elevate the scenes. Ever since the director narrated the story, I started thinking about how to make the fights novel". Initially Prayaga Martin was cast for the lead actress role. Few scenes were also shot featuring her, but was later replaced by Pragya Jaiswal. Pragya was cast in November 2020 after which she joined the production in December 2020. She was part of a 33-day first schedule shot at Hyderabad, Tamil Nadu and Goa. In an interview with The Times of India, she said that "I had to join the film sets as soon as I was roped in, so my prep time was very little. It took me a while to transform myself into the character, and that happened on the sets of 'Akhanda'. I had taken a few references from the real-life lady cops and noted every detail related to their dressing, mannerisms, and small-big details". Stylist and costume designer Raamz has been roped for designing costumes in the film. Speaking to Neeshita Nyayapati about designing costumes for Balakrishna's dual characters, he told that "Given Balakrishna's larger-than-life persona, I wanted to create looks that would remain memorable for years to come. Boyapati Srinu's (the film's director) Akhanda Movie is a Devotional Action Movie which will impress the audience. We also designed his tattoos and the Shiva Lingam locket that he uses in fight scenes".

=== Filming ===
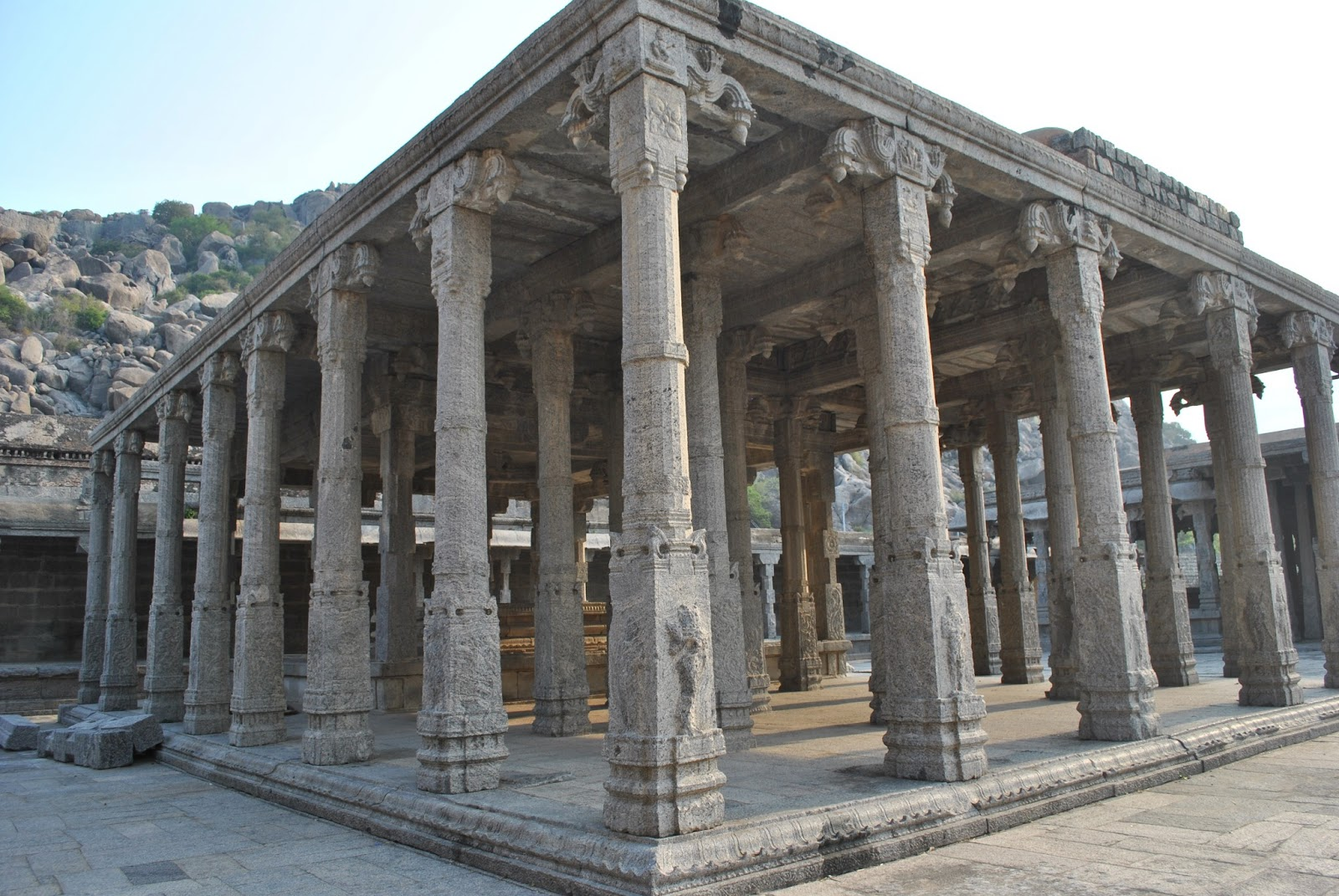
Gingee Venkataramana Temple, where climax scenes were shot

Principal photography of the film began in March 2020. After the filming was halted due to COVID-19 pandemic in India, final schedule of the film was resumed in July 2021 at Hyderabad. Few scenes of the film were shot at Gandhi Institute of Technology and Management, Hyderabad Campus. Filming of climax scenes of the film began in end-July 2021 at Tamil Nadu. Most of the action scenes were features Balakrishna and Srikanth. These action scenes were choreographed by Shiva. It was reported that the scenes were shot at Gingee Venkataramana Temple in Viluppuram district of Tamil Nadu. As part of the final schedule, the team next headed to Goa in September 2021 to shoot songs of the film. Filming was wrapped up in October 2021.

== Music ==
The film score and soundtrack album of the film is composed by Thaman S. The first single from the soundtrack, "Adigaa Adigaa" was released on 18 September 2021. The second single "Akhanda Title Song" was released on 8 November 2021. The last single of the album "Jai Balayya" was released on 27 November 2021, during the pre-release event of the film held at Hyderabad. The music rights were acquired by Lahari Music.

== Release ==
=== Theatrical ===
The film was initially planned to be released on 28 May 2021. But due to the COVID-19 pandemic in India, the film was delayed to 2 December 2021. The Tamil dubbed version of the film was released on 28 January 2022. The film was also dubbed in Hindi under the same title and released on 20 January 2023.

=== Home media ===
Digital distribution rights of the film were acquired by JioHotstar for ₹15 crore. Satellite rights of the film were purchased by Star Maa. The film was premiered on Hotstar on 21 January 2022 and became the most watched regional film on OTT platforms. The movie had its television premiere on Star Maa on 10 April 2022. The satellite rights of the Hindi dub were sold to Zee Cinema.

== Reception ==
=== Critical response ===
A reviewer from The Hans India rated 3 out of 5 stars, and called it Balakrishna's "one man show", adding "Living up to the expectations, Akhanda also showers a mass treat on the fans. The film is impressive in the way it was made." However, the reviewer was critical of predictable plot and screenplay.

Writing for The Times of India, Neeshita Nyayapati wrote, "While the basic premise of Akhanda is interesting, especially the way Boyapati sets it up by weaving a historical story with mass moments in a way only he can, he soon loses the plot (literally) and gets carried away with giving Akhanda and Murali mass moments that are sure to elicit whistles but don't do anything for the story." In her review for The Hindu, Sangeetha Devi Dundoo also echoes the same. "The film gets tiresome post intermission and the incessantly high voltage background score doesn't help either," she added.

The Indian Express critic Manoj Kumar R said that the film was "an assault on the senses". Kumar was critical of Boyapati's usage of spirituality to provide a moral justification for the character to slaughter people with impunity while trying to appear as pro-progress and pro-rational. In another negative review, Ram Venkat Srikar of Cinema Express, wrote: "Akhanda is a quintessential Boyapati Sreenu outing where logic dies a brutal death even before the title appears and the audience die a slow death for the next 167 minutes."

=== Box office ===
Akhanda collected ₹20.8 crore in the Telugu states on its opening day. Whereas, it has collected a total of ₹29.60 crore worldwide on its opening day. The film collected ₹44 crore, by the second day of its release. At the United States box office, it collected of more than $500,000 within two days of its release. By the third day of the film's release, it had collected ₹56.90 crore worldwide. After four days, the film collected ₹66.7 crores.

By the end of first week, the film grossed ₹79.9 crore worldwide. The film crossed the ₹95.9 crore worldwide gross in 11 days. By the end of its run, the film grossed ₹133.20 crores. In theatres, the film completed 50 days in 103 centres.

== Accolades ==
Award (Note: Awards, festivals and organizations are in alphabetical order.)	Date of ceremony (Note: Date is linked to the article about the awards held that year, wherever possible.)	Category	Recipient(s)	Result	Ref.
Filmfare Awards South	9 October 2022	Best Film – Telugu	Madhire Ravinder Reddy	Nominated	
South Indian International Movie Awards	10 September 2022	SIIMA Award for Best Actor in a Negative Role – Telugu	Srikanth	Won	
South Indian International Movie Awards	10 September 2022	SIIMA Award for Best Cinematographer – Telugu	Ram Prasad	Won	

== Sequel ==
On 12 October 2024, a sequel titled Akhanda 2: Thaandavam, went on floors with a pooja ceremony. Later, a teaser was released on 10 June 2025. It was originally supposed to release on 25 September 2025, during the Dussehra (Vijayadashami) festival holidays. The film released on 12 December 2025.
