= Srikanth Addala =

Indian film director and screenwriter

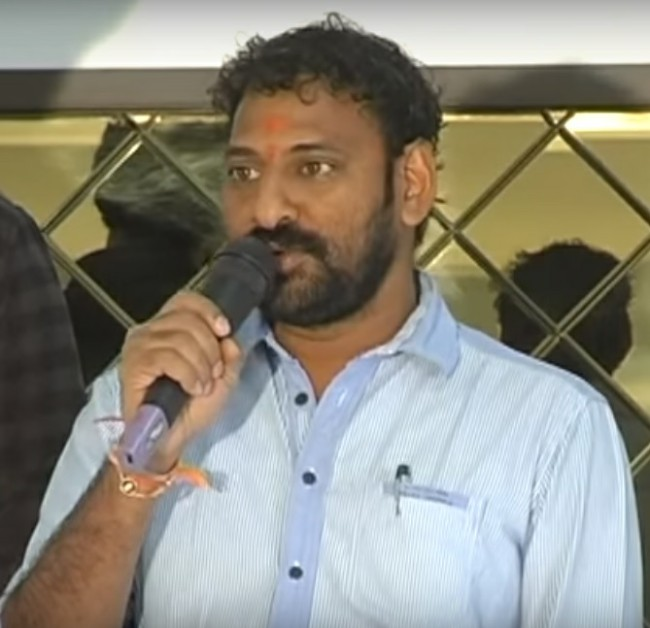
- Addala in December 2014
- Occupations: Director; screenwriter
- Years active: 2004–present

Srikanth Addala is an Indian film director and screenwriter who works in Telugu cinema. After working as an assistant director for several films, he made his directorial debut in 2008 with Kotha Bangaru Lokam. He went on to write and direct films such as Seethamma Vakitlo Sirimalle Chettu (2013), Mukunda (2014), Brahmotsavam (2016), and Narappa (2021).

== Career ==
Addala began his career in the film industry as an assistant director. While working for the film Arya (2004), he was associated with producer Dil Raju. Raju was impressed with Addala and gave him an advance of ₹9000 to come up with a story. After working as an assistant for the film Bommarillu (2006), he worked for six months and came up with the script for Kotha Bangaru Lokam. The film, featuring Varun Sandesh and Shweta Prasad, was released in 2008. The film was commercially successful and won multiple Nandi Awards and Filmfare Awards in various categories. After nearly two years, Addala began working on Seethamma Vakitlo Sirimalle Chettu with Venkatesh and Mahesh Babu. Produced by Raju, the film was released on 11 January 2013 to positive reviews. He later directed films like Mukunda, Brahmotsavam (2016), and Narappa (2021).

== Filmography ==
=== As writer and director ===
Year	Film	Notes
2008	Kotha Bangaru Lokam	
2013	Seethamma Vakitlo Sirimalle Chettu	
2014	Mukunda	
2016	Brahmotsavam	
2021	Narappa	Remake of Asuran
2023	Peddha Kapu 1	

=== As lyricist ===
Title	Album	Year	Singer(s)	Notes
"Kalasaalalo"	Kotha Bangaru Lokam	2008	Krishna Chaitanya, Aditya, Siddhartha, Kranthi, Sasikiran, Aditya	
"Aata Paatalaadu"	Brahmotsavam	2016	Karthik	

As actor

- Arya (2004)
- Bommarillu (2006) as a shopping mall staff member
- Peddha Kapu 1(2023)
