= Mukunda =

- Film poster
- Directed by: Srikanth Addala
- Written by: Srikanth Addala
- Produced by: Tagore Madhu; Nallamalapu Srinivas (Bujji)
- Starring: Varun Tej; Pooja Hegde
- Cinematography: S. Manikandan
- Edited by: Marthand K. Venkatesh
- Music by: Mickey J. Meyer
- Production company: Leo Productions
- Release date: 24 December 2014
- Running time: 142 minutes
- Country: India
- Language: Telugu

Mukunda is a 2014 Indian Telugu-language drama film written and directed by Srikanth Addala. The film was produced by Tagore Madhu and Nallamalapu Srinivas (Bujji), under Leo Productions. It stars debutant Varun Tej and Pooja Hegde in the lead roles with Prakash Raj, Ravi Babu Rao Ramesh, Navdeep, Sameer Hasan, Murali Mohan, Nadhiya, Sudeepa Pinky, Nagendra Babu, and Nassar in supporting roles. Mickey J. Meyer composed the film's soundtrack and background score. Marthand K. Venkatesh edited the film.

Production began on 27 February 2014 in Hyderabad. Principal photography commenced on 24 March 2014 in Cochin and was completed on 16 December 2014 in Hyderabad. The film was initially titled Gollabhama. Apart from Hyderabad, the film was predominantly shot in Andhra Pradesh at places like Rajahmundry, Bhimavaram, and Bhadrachalam as well as in Cochin and Alleppey in Kerala and at Kanyakumari, Pollachi in Tamil Nadu.

Mukunda released worldwide on 24 December 2014, on the eve of Christmas. The film received positive reviews from critics praising the cast performances (particularly Varun Tej and Pooja Hegde), dialogues, songs and background score besides criticizing the screenplay, editing and slow pace of the film. The film was success at the box office.

Later the film was dubbed into Hindi as Dushman No.1 and it was also dubbed in Tamil and Malayalam in the same title.

== Plot ==
Mukunda is a college-going student who goes to any extent for his friends. One day, his best friend falls in love with the daughter of brother of a powerful municipal chairman. Things take an ugly turn when Mukunda enters the scene and decides to go against the chairman and his power. The rest of the story is about how he wins and inspires others and how he falls in love with Municipal Chairman's daughter.

== Cast ==
- Varun Tej Konidela as Mukunda, Gopika’s love interest
- Pooja Hegde as Gopika, Mukunda’s love interest
- Prakash Raj as Jaya Prakash
- Rao Ramesh as Municipal Chairman
- Sameer As Minister, Gopika’s uncle
- Nassar as DSP Mohan Krishna
- Paruchuri Venkateswara Rao as Venkatachalam, Mukunda's father
- Giri Babu as Rama Chandra Murthy, Gopika's father
- Suhasini Maniratnamas Snehalatha, Mukunda's mother
- Sumithra as Lakshmi, Gopika's mother
- Ritu Varma as Vaishnavi, Gopika's sister
- Subbaraju as Subbu, Gopika’s brother
- Abhimanyu Singh as Ranga
- Ali as Veeraraju
- Raghu Babu as Chairman's assistant
- Praveen as Sathish, Mukunda's friend
- Satyadev as one of chairman's gang
- Krishna Teja as Mukunda's friend
- Deepti Sirdesai
- Sekhar Kammula (cameo appearance) as Mukunda's uncle

== Production ==
=== Development ===
C. Aswini Dutt approached Puri Jagannadh to prepare a script and direct the debut film of Naga Babu's son Varun Tej. The project failed to materialize and subsequently, Puri Jagannadh produced and directed that script which was titled Heart Attack starring Nithin and Adah Sharma. Srikanth Addala was confirmed to direct the film in late January 2014. The film was announced to be shot in the locales of Kerala and East Godavari. The film was formally launched at Hyderabad on 27 February 2014. The film was confirmed to be produced by Nallamalapu Srinivas and Tagore Madhu jointly on Leo Productions banner. Mickey J. Meyer was announced as the film's music director while S. Manikandan was announced as the Director of photography. The film's opening ceremony was aired live on MAA TV which was the first time ever for a Telugu film. Pooja Hegde confirmed the film's title as Gollabhama in early June 2014. The film's title was changed in early August 2014 with Mukunda Murari being the possible title. However, on Krishnashtami, the makers renamed the film as Mukunda.

=== Casting ===
"I was blown away by Srikanth Addala's narration and he has great clarity about what he wants. That sort of makes our job easy on the sets. I'm glad that I have got a chance to play a different character compared to my role in my debut film and my role is one of the key elements in the film."

— Pooja Hegde, regarding her character in the film.

Prior to this film, Varun Tej underwent training in acting skills under the supervision of Satyanand who trained Varun's uncle Pawan Kalyan. Either of Akshara Haasan and Parineeti Chopra was rumored as the film's female lead. Pooja Hegde was finalized as the film's female lead later. Prakash Raj, Brahmanandam, Rao Ramesh and Nassar were confirmed to appear in crucial roles during the film's launch. Varun Tej was reported to be seen as a volleyball player in the film in late March 2014. Allu Arjun was reported to make a cameo appearance in the film in mid June 2014. The film's unit confirmed those reports as rumors later. Sekhar Kammula was reported to make a cameo appearance in the film.

=== Filming ===
Principal photography was supposed to start from 15 March 2014 in Kerala. The filming began on 24 March 2014 at Cochin. The film was reported to be shot in the locales of Alappuzha. Varun Tej suffered a fracture during the filming of an action sequence at Alleppey and shooting resumed after his recovery. On its completion, the next schedule began in Konaseema. The film was shot in places like Rajahmundry, Bhimavaram, Samalkota and adjoining areas for four weeks. The film was also shot in areas like Pollachi, Kanyakumari and Yanam in early June 2014. The schedule ended almost after 33 days on 4 July and the team returned to Hyderabad. A new schedule began at Hyderabad on 29 July on whose completion, the filming continued in Amalapuram from 5 August.

By then, the film entered dubbing phase. Varun Tej began dubbing for his role in late August 2014 and by then, filming neared completion except for few songs. At Amalapuram, a crucial scene featuring Varun Tej, Rao Ramesh and Pooja Hegde was shot where Varun Tej was seen taking part in a municipal election campaign visiting several houses in the locality to create awareness among the people. After shooting the film there for 10 days, a song was shot on the lead pair in Switzerland. The schedule ended on 16 September 2014. In mid November 2014, Srikanth Addala said that the remaining part of the film would be shot in Hyderabad and a big set is being planned for a song. The last song was shot in a special set erected at Nanakramguda in mid December 2014. Pooja Hegde confirmed that the filming came to an end on 16 December 2014.

== Music ==
Mickey J Meyer was selected to compose the film's soundtrack and background music continuing his association with Srikanth Addala after Kotha Bangaru Lokam (2008) and Seethamma Vakitlo Sirimalle Chettu (2012). The soundtrack features 6 songs and a Theme music whose lyrics were penned by Sirivennela Sitaramasastri. Aditya Music acquired the soundtrack rights in mid August 2014 for an undisclosed high price.

The soundtrack was expected to be launched in September 2014 initially. The release was postponed to November 2014. The release date was later finalized as 3 December 2014. Shilpakala Vedika was announced as the venue on 2 December and also, a song teaser was unveiled as a part of promotion. Chiranjeevi attended the audio launch along with Allu Arjun as the chief guests and unveiled the soundtrack.

== Release ==
=== Theatrical ===
The film's overseas theatrical distribution rights were acquired by Asian Movies and CineGalaxy, Inc. The film was initially scheduled for a Sankranthi release, in mid January 2015. However, the film's release was advanced to 25 December 2014 as a Christmas release to avoid clash with Gopala Gopala. The film was awarded an U/A certificate by Central Board of Film Certification on 19 December 2014 and the release date was locked as 24 December 2014. The film released in 75 theaters across United States and premiere shows were held on 23 December 2014. The film however clashed with Chinnadana Nee Kosam which released in equal number of theaters across the world.

=== Marketing ===
The film's first look posters featuring Varun Tej were unveiled on 21 August 2014. The first look teaser was unveiled by Varun Tej on 2 September 2014. A video teaser of the song Chesededo featuring Varun Tej was unveiled a month later on 2 December 2014. A new trailer was unveiled on 6 December 2014.

=== Home media ===
The film's satellite rights were acquired by Zee Network. The original Telugu-language version of the film was premiered on television on 19 April 2015 on Zee Telugu. ZEE5 and Amazon Prime Video acquired the digital rights for streaming the film.

Apart from Telugu, the film had dubbed versions in Hindi (titled Dushman No.1), Tamil, and Malayalam.

== Reception ==
=== Critical response ===
The film received positive reviews from critics praising the cast performances (particularly Varun Tej and Pooja Hegde), dialogues, songs and background score besides criticizing the screenplay, editing and slow pace of the film. Y. Sunitha Chowdary of The Hindu wrote "Since most of the story centres on the debate and dialogue, rather than an expected logical ending, it is likely that many regular cine goers will go home dissatisfied. But for those who appreciate truth, facts of life and intelligent conversations, this is a film smartly interspersed with action and village politics for today’s youth".

Hemanth Kumar of The Times of India rated the film 3 out of 5 and wrote "Every once in a while there comes a film, which stands apart from the rest in terms of the subject it explores and the tone of narrative, although the nuances might not be blatant. You know it's different because it tries to break free from the template of an action comedy, a genre that has become synonymous with Telugu cinema these days. Mukunda is exactly that kind of film and much more. It's a film which is so aware of the milieu that it's exploring that you get sucked into the narrative to have a ringside look at the complex characters that inhabit the canvas the story unfolds on." Suresh Kavirayani of Deccan Chronicle rated the film 3 out of 5 and stated "Finally it’s not a regular commercial film, a typical Srikanth Addala kind of film, without the double meaning dialogues and vulgarity".

=== Box office ===
Mukunda grossed over ₹4 crore on its opening day from Telugu regions alone. The film was a success at the box office.

== Accolades ==
Award	Year	Category	Recipient(s)	Result
Nandi Awards	2014	Best Female Playback Singer	K. S. Chithra (for "Gopikamma"	Won
CineMAA Awards	2014	Best Female Playback Singer Telugu	K. S. Chithra (for "Gopikamma"	Won
Santosham Film Awards	2014	Best Female Playback Singer Telugu	K. S. Chithra (for "Gopikamma"	Won
Santosham Film Awards	2014	Best Actress	Pooja Hegde	Nominated
CineMAA Awards	2015	Best Female Playback Singer Telugu	K. S. Chithra (for "Gopikamma"	Won
South Indian International Movie Awards	2015	Best Female Playback Singer – Telugu	K. S. Chithra (for "Gopikamma"	Nominated
South Indian International Movie Awards	2015	Best Music Director – Telugu	Mickey J. Meyer	Nominated
South Indian International Movie Awards	2015	Best Lyricist – Telugu	Sirivennela Seetharama Sastry (for "Nandalala")	Nominated
TSR– TV9 National Film Awards	2015	Best Actress	Pooja Hegde	Nominated
