= Seethamma Vakitlo Sirimalle Chettu =

2013 film by Srikanth Addala

- Theatrical release poster
- Directed by: Srikanth Addala
- Written by: Srikanth Addala
- Dialogues by: Ganesh Patro
- Produced by: Dil Raju
- Starring: Venkatesh; Mahesh Babu; Anjali; Samantha
- Cinematography: K. V. Guhan
- Edited by: Marthand K. Venkatesh
- Music by: Songs: Mickey J. Meyer; Background Score: Mani Sharma
- Production company: Sri Venkateswara Creations
- Distributed by: Sri Venkateswara Creations; 14 Reels Entertainment
- Release date: 11 January 2013
- Running time: 159 minutes
- Country: India
- Language: Telugu
- Budget: ₹50 crore

Seethamma Vakitlo Sirimalle Chettu (Note: Alternatively spelt Sitamma Vakitlo Sirimalle Chettu.) (transl. The jasmine vine in Seethamma's courtyard), also known by the initialism SVSC, is a 2013 Indian Telugu-language comedy drama film written and directed by Srikanth Addala. It was produced by Dil Raju's Sri Venkateswara Creations, and stars Venkatesh, Mahesh Babu, Anjali and Samantha, while Prakash Raj, Jayasudha, Rao Ramesh, Kota Srinivasa Rao, Abhinaya and Rohini Hattangadi play supporting roles.

In addition to directing the film, Addala worked on the script for three years after the release of his directorial debut, Kotha Bangaru Lokam (2008). He wrote the screenplay and the story with Ganesh Patro writing the dialogues. Mickey J. Meyer and Mani Sharma composed the soundtrack and background score, respectively. Marthand K. Venkatesh edited the film and K. V. Guhan was its cinematographer. Production began on 6 October 2011 in Hyderabad; principal photography began on 18 January 2012 in Visakhapatnam, and finished on 24 December. In addition to Hyderabad, scenes were filmed in coastal Andhra Pradesh, Tamil Nadu and Kerala.

Seethamma Vakitlo Sirimalle Chettu was released worldwide on 11 January 2013 to acclaim. The film was commercially successful, earning a distributor share of ₹51 crore on a budget of ₹40 crore, and was the second-highest-grossing Telugu film of the year (after Attarintiki Daredi ). It received seven nominations at the 61st Filmfare Awards South and eleven nominations at the 3rd South Indian International Movie Awards, winning two awards at each: Best Actor Male — Telugu (Mahesh Babu) and Best Playback Singer Female — Telugu (K. S. Chithra). The film won four Nandi Awards, including the Award for Best Home-viewing Feature Film.

== Plot ==
A benevolent middle-aged man, fondly referred to as Relangi Mavayya (transl. Uncle from Relangi), resides in his hometown with his wife, children (2 sons and a daughter), elderly mother and orphaned niece Seetha, whom they fostered. Reticent,"Peddodu" (transl. the elder one) resigns from his uncle Brahmananda Rao's company, upset over being chastised, while "Chinnodu" (transl. the younger one) is sharp-witted and flirtatious. Friends and kin presume that Seetha, being Peddodu's cross cousin, would marry him. Despite being cognizant of her own feelings for him, Seetha is disappointed with the fact that he never addresses her by her name. Ramachandra Prasad, Seetha's paternal uncle, a wealthy individual, despises the financial stature of Relangi Mavayya's family; his daughter Geetha and Chinnodu meet at the wedding of the former's elder sister, and develop feelings for each other.

A distant relative, Kondal Rao and his son Gooduraju envy Relangi Mavayya and his sons' image among everyone. Geetha's elder sister and her in-laws run into Relangi Mavayya and his daughter Chinni in a train and deem her potential to be the wife of a relative, prompting the alliance to be eventually finalized. Ramachandra Prasad humiliates Peddodu during the wedding ceremony, intensifying the tensions between them. Peddodu and Chinnodu go to Hyderabad with the intent to find employment. Geetha, who has been in the city with her family, summons Chinnodu to a restaurant, concealing her family's presence. Ramachandra Prasad belittles him and his family once again, causing Chinnodu to insult him in front of his family and threatening to beat him up if he insults his family again and furiously walk out. Geetha attempts to cheer Chinnodu up, but they stumble upon Peddodu, who is unhappy about their affair and goes home. Geetha's relationship with Chinnodu is thus strained.

Ramachandra Prasad finds a suitor for her but his mother resists and commands him to get Seetha married in the first place. Ramachandra Prasad discourages Relangi Mavayya's interest in getting Seetha married to Peddodu and finds a marriage proposal for her. Nevertheless, the alliance is spoiled. Relangi Mavayya falls prey to a road accident while rescuing a young boy and sustains minor wounds; Brahmananda Rao, the young boy's uncle, apologizes and offers a job to Chinnodu. Elsewhere, Peddodu and Chinnodu's rift widens, owing to unfinished conversations. Relangi Mavayya and his family attend the annual "Kalyanam (transl. Marriage) of Rama and Sita in Bhadrachalam, which is coincidentally attended by Geetha and her family. A short circuit causes chaos; Peddodu and Chinnodu rescue Geetha's family and other devotees. Praising the brothers, their father reminds them of their love for each other and details the importance of adjusting, brotherhood and family. This transforms their attitude, prompting their reconciliation. Having eavesdropped on their conversation, Ramachandra Prasad reforms. Peddodu addresses Seetha by her name, hinting his love for her and they marry as Geetha's father performs the rituals on Seetha's father's behalf. Chinnodu and Geetha too harmonize. Later, Chinnodu and Peddodu buy bangles for their grandmother, implying that they have found employment.

== Cast ==
- Prakash Raj as Relangi Mavayya, Peddodu and Chinnodu & Chinni's father & Rao Ramesh’s brother-in-law
- Jayasudha as Saavitri, Relangi Mavayya's wife, Peddodu and Chinnodu's mother
- Venkatesh as Peddodu, Relangi Mavayya's elder son
- Mahesh Babu as Chinnodu, Relangi Mavayya's younger son
- Anjali as Seetha, Peddodu's love interest / cousin
- Samantha as Geetha, Chinnodu's love interest
- Abhinaya as Chinni, Relangi’s daughter
- Rao Ramesh as Ramachandra Prasad, Seetha’s paternal uncle
- Kota Srinivasa Rao as P. Brahmananda Rao
- Rohini Hattangadi as Seetha's maternal grandmother
- Rama Prabha as Seetha and Geetha's paternal grandmother
- Ahuti Prasad as Geetha's father
- Tanikella Bharani as Kondala Rao
- Ravi Babu as Goodu Raju, Kondala Rao's son
- Murali Mohan as Local MLA, Relangi Mavayya's friend
- Rajitha as Geetha's aunt
- Dhanya Balakrishna as a girl who proposes to Chinnodu
- Kalpika Ganesh as Geetha's elder sister
- Tejaswi Madivada as Geetha's younger sister
- Venu Madhav as Omkar, Census Officer
- Praveen as Peddodu's friend
- Srinivasa Reddy as Peddodu's friend
- Satyadev as Chinnodu's friend
- Raja Ravindra as Police Officer
- Prabhas Sreenu as Goodu Raju's friend
- Prudhvi Raj
- Gemini Suresh as Peddodu's coworker
- Vajja Venkata Giridhar as Wedding guest at Peddodu and Seetha's wedding
- Vennela Rama Rao as Chinnodu's friend
- Suryakantham (photo) as Relangi Mavayya's grandmother
- SV Ranga Rao (photo) as Relangi Mavayya's grandfather
- Srikanth Addala in a cameo appearance in the song "Musire Mabbula"
- Syed Sohel as Wedding guest at Peddodu and Seetha's wedding (uncredited role)
- Brahmanandam (deleted scenes)

== Production ==
=== Development ===
After the release of his directorial debut, Kotha Bangaru Lokam (2008), Srikanth Addala worked for three years on Seethamma Vakitlo Sirimalle Chettu's script. After Vedam's release, in June 2010 Dil Raju began planning a film directed by Addala and featuring Venkatesh and Pawan Kalyan as the male leads. Scripting began, and the film's title was announced in September. When the project stalled, Addala approached Mahesh Babu with its script in June 2011.

Babu agreed to act in the film after Addala met him to read the script during pre-production for Dookudu (2011). He and Venkatesh cited the script's emotional depth and realistic approach as the reason they signed for the film. Addala approached Ganesh Patro in Chennai to write the film's dialogue. Patro used the dialect spoken in the Godavari region of Andhra Pradesh, edited by Addala. It was his final project as a dialogue writer before his death in January 2015. K. V. Guhan, who worked on the previous Babu films Athadu (2005) and Dookudu, was signed as Seethamma Vakitlo Sirimalle Chettu's cinematographer.

Mickey J. Meyer, who worked with Addala on the director's debut, composed the film's soundtrack and Mani Sharma composed its score. Sharma had composed the score for Raju's 2011 production, Oh My Friend, whose soundtrack was composed by Rahul Raj. Although production began in Hyderabad on the eve of Vijayadasami (6 October 2011) with a launch ceremony, Venkatesh and Babu did not attend due to previous film commitments. "Simple but beautiful" was announced as the film's advertising slogan in June 2012.

=== Casting ===
Seethamma Vakitlo Sirimalle Chettu is considered the first Telugu star-studded film in the last two or three decades. After listening to Addala's narration, Venkatesh felt that they could work more on the film's script and the director agreed. The actor agreed to the film because he considered it a safe bet which would appeal to a family audience. Raju was interested in casting Babu as the lead for two reasons: the film, revolving around two brothers, required two popular actors as the leads and the producer again wanted to work with the actor after Murari (2001), Takkari Donga (2002), Okkadu (2003) and Athadu. Guhan told The Hindu that Venkatesh's and Babu's unnamed characters would simply be called Peddodu and Chinnodu, respectively. The film is considered to be the first multi-starrer of Telugu cinema in recent decades.

Samantha Ruth Prabhu was signed to play Babu's love interest in the film, and Raju asked her to allow 40 days for shooting. After Trisha, Bhumika Chawla and Anushka Shetty were considered for the other female lead, Amala Paul was signed in mid-December 2011. After a photo shoot and the beginning of principal photography, Paul left the project in late January 2012 and Raju replaced her with Anjali.

Prakash Raj was cast in a principal role as the brothers' father. When he failed to join the film unit in Kutralam, it was rumoured that he had walked out of the film due to differences with Raju but Raju denied the reports. Jayasudha and Rohini Hattangadi were signed for supporting roles, and Hattangadi said that she would play the brothers' grandmother. Rao Ramesh played Samantha's father in the film.

Miss Dabur Gulabari 2011 second runner-up Tejaswi Madivada was signed for a supporting role in her acting debut, and Abhinaya was cast as Babu's sister in the film. Rama Prabha, Tanikella Bharani, Kota Srinivasa Rao, Brahmanandam and Ahuti Prasad later joined the film's supporting cast. Traditional and formal costumes were supplied by the clothing chain Kalamandir.

=== Filming ===
"For the SVSC set, the director and I spent a few days in East and West Godavari districts and saw the houses... the front and back yards, where they plant flowers etc. We planted big coconut trees which we took from Kadiyam village near Rajahmundry."

— A. S. Prakash in an interview with Deccan Chronicle in October 2015.

Principal photography began on 18 January 2012 in Visakhapatnam, where several of Venkatesh's scenes were filmed near the Andhra University campus and on the Ramakrishna Mission Beach. The next shooting schedule began in Kutralam, Tamil Nadu, on 6 February 2012 and filming continued in Hyderabad during March. In Sanathnagar a crowd disrupted shooting, and the film's crew chose an undisclosed location to resume. Samantha joined the film unit on 28 March. After shooting was disrupted three times in Hyderabad by crowds, Babu suggested that Raju move production to Chennai (where several wedding scenes were filmed at a coconut plantation). Rain increased production costs.

Part of the song "Yem Cheddaam" was shot at the Sabarmati Riverfront in mid-April, the riverfront's first appearance in a Telugu film. In addition to the riverfront, scenes were filmed over a fifteen-day schedule in shopping malls and gardens around Ahmedabad. Addala chose the city for its developing infrastructure, friendly people and climatic similarity to Hyderabad. On 31 May 2012, Raju told the media that 35 percent of Seethamma Vakitlo Sirimalle Chettu's filming was completed and the next shooting schedule would begin at Ramoji Film City. A house set worth ₹10 million was built at the studio under the supervision of A. S. Prakash. Venkatesh and Anjali began a four-day shooting schedule at Ahobilam on 4 July. After several key scenes were filmed in Relangi, near Tanuku, a new schedule began in Bhadrachalam on 16 July.

Filming was delayed when Samantha became ill, resuming on 19 August after her recovery. By mid-September, the producers had filmed for nearly 80 working days. Wedding and other crucial scenes were filmed in Chennai. By then the shooting of five songs was completed, with work on two more songs and detail work pending. Raju planned two shooting schedules: one from 28 September to 12 October, and the other from 15 November to the end of the month. Filming continued on 2 October 2012 at Ramanaidu Studios. The film's climactic scenes were shot in mid-November 2012 on a custom-built Bhadrachalam Temple set at Ramoji Film City, and the dialogue was wrapped up on 17 November.

A song featuring Babu and Samantha was shot in Magarpatta, Pune, in early December, and scenes following Chinni's wedding were filmed in Dwaraka Tirumala. Another song featuring Venkatesh and Anjali was shot in Kerala under the supervision of Prem Rakshith; its completion marked the end of principal photography on 24 December.

=== Post-production ===
On 6 October 2012, a pooja commemorated the beginning of the film's dubbing. Post-production was planned simultaneously for a December 2012 release. On 23 October, Samantha began dubbing her role in the film. This was the first time she dubbed for herself in a Telugu film; her roles had previously been dubbed by the singer Chinmayi. Babu began dubbing his role on 10 December; Venkatesh had completed most of his dubbing work by then, with only a few reels remaining.

In mid-December, Samantha said that she had dubbed 40 percent of her role and the producers would decide if her voice would be retained; Chinmayi and Dubbing Janaki were later chosen to dub for Prabhu and Hattangadi. Babu finished dubbing his role by early January 2013, and post-production ended on 3 January. The first copy of the film was sent to the Central Board of Film Certification on 7 January, and it was cleared by the Board the following day.

== Themes ==
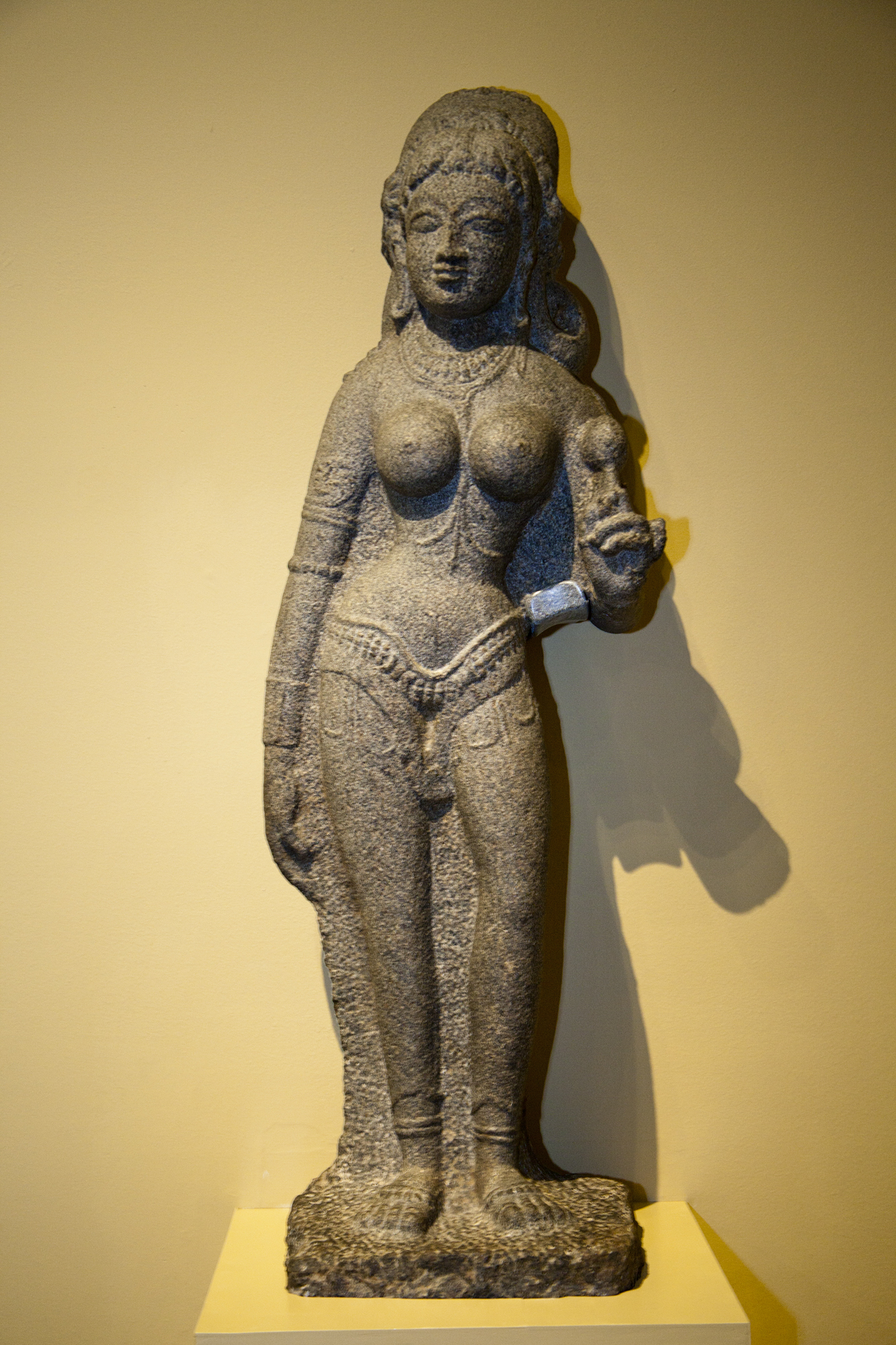
In the film's title, Seethamma stands for Sita (left), Vakitlo for India (right) and Sirimalle Chettu for the Indian family.

Raju said in early October 2011 that Seethamma Vakitlo Sirimalle Chettu would be a family drama; its title focuses on the family system in India, a part of the Indian ideology of one world family. According to Addala, "Seethamma" stands for the goddess Sita, "Vakitlo" for India and "Sirimalle Chettu" for the Indian family. The mentality of a person who does not smile at a fellow human but preaches the need for change in society and improvement in human relations was the basis of the film's script. The director tells the story of two brothers of different ages who are not expressive, showing them safeguarding their identities but having a deep love and respect for each other.

Addala travelled to Yanam and other places in East Godavari district to study the mentality and behaviour of the local people. He noticed that about 80 percent of the families had good fathers, and their sons (who were struggling to find jobs and establish themselves) reconciled easily after small disagreements. Addala decided to convey in the film that life would be easier if small problems can be corrected. Most of the characters, except Seetha, are drawn from real life; Babu's character represents youth, and Venkatesh and Prakash Raj's characters exemplify an elder brother and a middle-class father.

The movie draws similarities to the 1962 movie Gundamma Katha, such as the appearance of late actors Suryakantham and SV Ranga Rao, parent figures in both movies, as well as the idea of two brothers marrying two "almost" sisters (parallel cousins and steps-sisters). Seetha and Lakshmi are both humble orphans, while Saroja and Geetha are more spoiled and live with their parent who conflicts with the main family. Peddhodu and Chinnodu reflect the same mature and immature dynamic as Anji and Raja, as well as ending up with their respective heroine. The movies also share an intro, through which a group of pictures of a certain group of characters is shown on a background before the credits.

== Soundtrack ==
Seethamma Vakitlo Sirimalle Chettu's soundtrack was composed by Mickey J Meyer, with lyrics by Ananta Sriram and Sirivennela Seetharama Sastry. Aditya Music acquired its marketing rights in early June 2012, and the soundtrack was released at an event at Ramanaidu Studios in Nanakramguda, Hyderabad, on 30 May 2012. A critical and commercial success, it was certified triple platinum at a 19 January 2013 ceremony at Shilpakala Vedika in Hyderabad.

== Release ==
=== Theatrical ===
In late April 2012 the producers planned a worldwide release on 28 September, three weeks before the release of Cameraman Gangatho Rambabu. Seethamma Vakitlo Sirimalle Chettu's release was expected to be postponed because of a filming delay after Samantha had an adverse drug reaction. Raju later announced that the film would be released on 21 December for Christmas, but due to production delays its release was postponed to 11 January 2013 for the three-day Sankranthi holiday. At Babu's suggestion a statewide premiere was planned a day before the general theatrical release, with the producers hoping to earn ₹10 million from the premiere.

Seethamma Vakitlo Sirimalle Chettu was released on 101 screens (considered a record) in the United States and on eight screens in Canada. The film was released in New York, New Jersey, the San Francisco Bay Area and Los Angeles. Seethamma Vakitlo Sirimalle Chettu was the first South Indian film to be released in Manhattan, premiering on 10 January 2013 at the Times Square AMC Empire 25 theatre. The film opened worldwide on 1,500 screens. In Hyderabad and Secunderabad, it was released on 85 screens and the cities' eight multiplexes scheduled 100 shows per day; tickets for the first week sold out in one day. Raju scheduled screenings for women only on 14, 15 and 16 January.

A Tamil remake proved cost-prohibitive, leading to an announcement of the Tamil-dubbed version Anandam Anandame in early October 2013. Viji Creations acquired the dubbing rights and P. Rajarajan wrote the dialogue for the dubbed version. It was also later dubbed and released in Tamil again under the title Nenjamellam Pala Vannam which was released in 2018.

=== Re-release ===
Seethamma Vakitlo Sirimalle Chettu was re-released in theaters worldwide on 7 March 2025. The Re-release achieved a strong worldwide opening, grossing over ₹3 crore on its first day. The film solidified its position among top re-release grossers with a total of ₹6.60 crore and received a strong nostalgic response from audiences.

=== Marketing ===
The film's first-look teaser was released on 31 May 2012. Within a day of its release the teaser attracted 227,319 views on YouTube, and 9,416 members shared it on Facebook. First-look posters saying "Happy birthday to my brother Mahesh Babu", signed by Venkatesh, were released on 8 August. Publicist B. A. Raju announced that another teaser would be released on 12 December, the day before Venkatesh's birthday, since the producers of Businessman (2012) had released a first-look poster featuring Babu on 11 November 2011. The film's theatrical trailer was released on 13 December. Red Label and Mega Mart entered into a co-branding partnership for the film.

=== Pre-release revenue ===
Seethamma Vakitlo Sirimalle Chettu's television broadcast rights were sold for ₹85 million to an undisclosed channel in early June 2012. Theatrical distribution rights for Krishna district were sold for ₹27.5 million in late October 2012. Vintage Creations and Srinikethan Films acquired the theatrical distribution rights for East Godavari and Nellore districts for ₹28.3 million and ₹18.5 million, respectively. 14 Reels Entertainment, in association with FICUS, acquired the film's overseas theatrical distribution rights in late November 2012.

=== Home media ===
Seethamma Vakitlo Sirimalle Chettu's Indian VCD, DVD and Blu-ray discs were marketed by Aditya Videos. Overseas DVD and Blu-ray discs were released in June 2013 by Bhavani Videos, and global television broadcast rights were acquired by MAA TV. After its global television premiere, Seethamma Vakitlo Sirimalle Chettu registered a TRP rating of 20.00, the second highest rating ever for a Telugu film after Magadheera (2009) which registered 22.00. It retained that spot until the global television premiere of Baahubali: The Beginning (2015) and Srimanthudu (2015). They registered the TRP ratings of 21.84 and 21.24 respectively, pushing Seethamma Vakitlo Sirimalle Chettu to the fourth spot. The film's premiere took place on MAA TV on 9 June 2013, and now the film is available for streaming on Prime Video, Disney+Hotstar, aha, and ETV Win and for rent on Apple TV and Google TV. The film is also available for free on YouTube channels of Aditya Videos and Sri Venkateswara Creations. In 2025 Zee Telugu acquired satellite rights from Star MAA and premiered on 16 March 2025

== Reception ==
=== Critical reception ===
Seethamma Vakitlo Sirimalle Chettu received critical acclaim. Sangeetha Devi Dundoo of The Hindu called the film a "delightful family drama with its celebration of family bonds, love and marriage laced with laughter", and Addala "wants to leave his audience with a thought, wants them to reflect on their relationships and overlook skirmishes that can sour family bonds". Dundoo cited Guhan's cinematography as one of the film's highlights, and praised its performances. Mahalakshmi Prabhakaran of Daily News and Analysis called the film a "heartwarming watch that has its emotions and underlying message in the right place". Calling Guhan's cinematography and its music wonderful, Prabhakaran also praised the film's cast.

According to IANS, "It is very unlikely to point out a single dull moment in this crowd-pleasing, tear-jerking healthy family entertainer that presents a story akin to every household". The reviewer added that the film "may or may not inspire one and all, but it will definitely send everybody back home with a smile".

Karthik Pasupulate of The Times of India gave Seethamma Vakitlo Sirimalle Chettu 3.5 out of five stars, calling it a "good old fashioned family drama sans the usual masala" and adding that it is "pleasant, well intended, and has some tender moments as well, but does it pack enough entertainment value". Pasupulate praised the performances, calling them understated like the rest of the film. Sify gave the film 3.25 out of five stars: "Seethamma Vaakitlo Sirimalle Chettu definitely makes you moist-eyed as you walk out from the theatre but it runs on a flimsy story. It is a film that reinforces the great Indian family values and is also a manipulative film like most Sooraj Barjatya's films." The reviewer praised the film's climax, adding that Babu's performance, the score, cinematography and its later scenes overshadowed its flaws.

Radhika Rajamani of Rediff gave the film three out of five stars: "While it cruises along smoothly, delving into relationships within the family, without too many conflicts or twists and turns, one feels an emotional disconnect sometimes because society has changed so much from what is portrayed on screen". She added, "The storyline is realistic, in that it is all about the happenings in a middle class home, but it's more about situations and doesn't develop as a story. So if you want to see a non-violent, family values kind of film, this one is for you. It's just that it seems a little out of date." B. V. S. Prakash of Deccan Chronicle gave the film 2.5 out of five stars, calling it a "dampener" and its scenes repetitive and tedious. Prakash praised the performances, however, especially those of Venkatesh and Babu.

=== Box office ===
Seethamma Vakitlo Sirimalle Chettu earned ₹9.81 crore on its first day at the AP-Nizam box office—according to trade analyst Trinath, probably the best-ever opening for a star-studded Telugu film. Taran Adarsh called the film's opening "mindblowing" as it earned US$205,347 (₹1.13 crore) at 62 locations on its Thursday previews in the United States. It earned $338,228 on Friday, bringing its two-day total to $552,041—the most successful opening for a Telugu film in the U.S. Seethamma Vakitlo Sirimalle Chettu netted ₹25.01 crore in four days at the global box office, the most successful opening in Babu and Venkatesh's careers. The film grossed $1,262,100 (₹6.87 crore) from reported screens in its first four-day weekend in the United States, affecting other films (such as Naayak and Matru Ki Bijlee Ka Mandola) and surpassing the US lifetime earnings of Gabbar Singh (2012). The film's earnings declined 25 percent on its fifth day, and its five-day total nett was ₹28.66 crore. Earning about ₹35 crore in its first week, Seethamma Vakitlo Sirimalle Chettu broke box-office records in several parts of the world. The film's earnings declined 50 percent over its second weekend, with a ten-day global box-office nett of ₹45 crore. In its second U.S. weekend the film earned $203,160 (₹1.09 crore), bringing its ten-day U.S. total to $1,548,709 (₹8.31 crore) and setting a record for a Telugu film in that country.

By the end of its second week, Seethamma Vakitlo Sirimalle Chettu netted ₹51 crore at the global box office. In the film's third weekend it was affected by Vishwaroopam, earning about ₹0.193 crore from 20 screens in the United States. It completed its 50-day run on 3 March in 25 theatres. Seethamma Vakitlo Sirimalle Chettu netted ₹38.75 crore at the AP/Nizam box office during its run, earning a distributor share of ₹51 crore at the global box office and declared a commercial success. It was the second-highest-grossing Telugu film of the year, after Attarintiki Daredi.

== Accolades ==
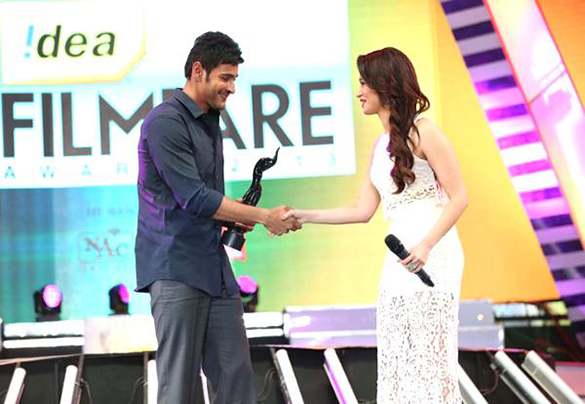
Babu receiving the Best Actor — Telugu award at the 61st Filmfare Awards South from actress Tamannaah

Seethamma Vakitlo Sirimalle Chettu was one of twenty Telugu film entries for the 61st National Film Awards. The film received seven nominations at the 61st Filmfare Awards South, including Best Telugu film, Best Director — Telugu and Best Actor — Telugu. It won two awards: Best Actor — Telugu (Babu) and Best Female Playback Singer — Telugu (K. S. Chithra for "Seethamma Vakitlo Sirimalle Chettu").

The film received eleven nominations at the 3rd South Indian International Movie Awards, where Venkatesh and Babu were nominated for Best Actor — Telugu and Anjali and Jayasudha were nominated for Best Supporting Actor Female — Telugu. It won three awards, again for Best Actor — Telugu (Babu) and Best Female Playback Singer — Telugu (Chithra for "Seethamma Vakitlo Sirimalle Chettu") besides Anantha Sreeram, who earned the award for Best Lyricist — Telugu for the same song. Babu also received the "Best Actor for the Year 2013" award at the 2015 TSR – TV9 National Film Awards.

Awards	Category	Nominee	Result
61st Filmfare Awards South	Best Film — Telugu	Dil Raju	Nominated
61st Filmfare Awards South	Best Director — Telugu	Srikanth Addala	Nominated
61st Filmfare Awards South	Best Actor — Telugu	Mahesh Babu	Won
61st Filmfare Awards South	Best Music Director — Telugu	Mickey J Meyer	Nominated
61st Filmfare Awards South	Best Supporting Actor — Telugu	Prakash Raj	Nominated
61st Filmfare Awards South	Best Supporting Actress — Telugu	Anjali	Nominated
61st Filmfare Awards South	Best Female Playback Singer — Telugu	K. S. Chithra (for song "Seethamma Vakitlo Sirimalle Chettu")	Won
3rd South Indian International Movie Awards	SIIMA Award for Best Film (Telugu)	Dil Raju	Nominated
3rd South Indian International Movie Awards	SIIMA Award for Best Director (Telugu)	Srikanth Addala	Nominated
3rd South Indian International Movie Awards	SIIMA Award for Best Actor (Telugu)	Mahesh Babu	Won
3rd South Indian International Movie Awards	SIIMA Award for Best Actor (Telugu)	Daggubati Venkatesh	Nominated
3rd South Indian International Movie Awards	SIIMA Award for Best Supporting Actor (Telugu)	Prakash Raj	Nominated
3rd South Indian International Movie Awards	SIIMA Award for Best Supporting Actress (Telugu)	Anjali	Nominated
3rd South Indian International Movie Awards	SIIMA Award for Best Supporting Actress (Telugu)	Jayasudha	Nominated
3rd South Indian International Movie Awards	SIIMA Award for Best Cinematographer (Telugu)	K. V. Guhan	Nominated
3rd South Indian International Movie Awards	SIIMA Award for Best Music Director (Telugu)	Mickey J. Meyer	Nominated
3rd South Indian International Movie Awards	SIIMA Award for Best Female Playback Singer (Telugu)	K. S. Chithra (for song "Seethamma Vakitlo Sirimalle Chettu")	Won
3rd South Indian International Movie Awards	SIIMA Award for Best Lyricist (Telugu)	Anantha Sreeram (for song "Seethamma Vakitlo Sirimalle Chettu")	Won
TSR – TV9 National Film Awards	Best Actor for the year 2013	Mahesh Babu	Won
Mirchi Music Awards	Best Female Playback Singer	K. S. Chithra (for song "Seethamma Vakitlo Sirimalle Chettu")	Won
Santosham Film Awards	Best Female Playback Singer	K. S. Chithra (for song "Seethamma Vakitlo Sirimalle Chettu")	Won
2013 Nandi Awards	Best Home-viewing Feature Film (Gold)	Dil Raju	Won
2013 Nandi Awards	Best Lyricist	Sirivennela Seetharama Sastry	Won
2013 Nandi Awards	Best Supporting Actor	Prakash Raj	Won
2013 Nandi Awards	Special Jury Award	Anjali	Won
