= Rakhwala (1989 film) =

1989 Hindi film directed by K. Muralimohana Rao

- Poster
- Directed by: K. Murali Mohana Rao
- Written by: N. S. Bedi; Kamlesh Pandey (dialogue)
- Story by: V. C. Guhanathan
- Based on: Michael Raj
- Produced by: D. Rama Naidu
- Starring: Anil Kapoor; Farha Naaz; Suresh Oberoi; Shakti Kapoor
- Edited by: K. A. Martand
- Music by: Anand–Milind
- Release date: 5 May 1989
- Country: India
- Language: Hindi

Rakhwala (transl. Protector) is a 1989 Indian Hindi-language film starring Anil Kapoor, Farha Naaz and Suresh Oberoi. The film was produced by D. Rama Naidu and directed by K. Murali Mohana Rao. Rakhwala is a remake of the 1987 Tamil film Michael Raj, which was also produced by D. Ramanaidu produced both versions as well as the Telugu remake.

== Cast ==
- Anil Kapoor as Vikram Bose
- Farha Naaz as Ramtaki
- Suresh Oberoi as Ranjeet
- Shabana Azmi as Journalist Kiran
- Tanuja as Janaki Bose, Vikram's Mother
- Prem Chopra as Jhingania Bose, Vikram's Father
- Shakti Kapoor as Inspector Dharam Raj
- Asrani as Sub Inspector Jamail Singh
- Annu Kapoor as Constable Atmaram
- Beena Banerjee as Ranjeet's wife
- Sharat Saxena as Savouries Store Owner
- Ketki Dave as Constable Geeta
- Ajit Vachani as Mr. Chinoy
- Master Rinku as Young Vikram
- Baby Shalini as Mini
- A K Hangal as Kiran Father
- Neelam Mehra as Menaka, Jhinghania Assistant
- Renu Joshi as Ranjeet Mother

== Soundtrack ==
Lyrics: Sameer

Song	Singer
"Aag Lag Rahi Hai, Tum Bujhao"	Mohammed Aziz, Anuradha Paudwal
"Jab Jab Teri Nazar Se Milti Hai Meri Nazar"	Mohammed Aziz, Sadhana Sargam
"Main Tera Rakhwala"	S. P. Balasubrahmanyam
"O My Love"	Amit Kumar, S. Janaki
"Bombay Meri Hai"	Amit Kumar
"Poochh Rahi Hai"	Alka Yagnik
