= Maqsad =

1984 Indian film by K. Bapaiah

- Theatrical release poster
- Directed by: K. Bapaiah
- Written by: Kader Khan
- Screenplay by: Paruchuri Brothers
- Story by: Paruchuri Brothers
- Based on: Mundadugu by Paruchuri Brothers
- Produced by: D. Rama Naidu
- Starring: Jeetendra; Rajesh Khanna; Jaya Prada; Sridevi
- Cinematography: A. Venkat
- Edited by: K. A. Marthand
- Music by: Bappi Lahiri
- Production company: Suresh Productions
- Release date: 4 May 1984
- Running time: 167 minutes
- Country: India
- Language: Hindi

Maqsad (transl. The Motive) is a 1984 Indian Hindi-language action film directed by K. Bapaiah and produced by D. Rama Naidu under the Suresh Productions banner. The film stars Jeetendra, Rajesh Khanna, Jaya Prada, Sridevi, and Waheeda Rehman. The music was composed by Bappi Lahiri. Shatrughan Sinha makes a guest appearance. Prem Chopra, Ranjeet, Shakti Kapoor, Kader Khan, Amjad Khan, and Shreeram Lagoo are featured in supporting roles.

Maqsad is remake of the 1983 Telugu film Mundadugu. It was the second highest-grossing film of 1984.

== Plot ==
Rajeshwar is the only son of Dharamraj, who is an industrialist, and partners with Naglingam Reddy, Nagendra, and Dhanraj. Rajeshwar then meets a girl from a poor family, Bharati, who happens to be his school teacher's daughter and falls in love with her.

Bharati's father is Vishnupratap, a schoolteacher, who is unhappy, for he is unable to earn enough money to feed his family and provide them with basic amenities. He and other teachers work in the school managed by Dharamraj. The fund management headed by Dhanraj has been for years without giving any hike in fees to teachers making them work. When Rajeshwar learns of this, he confronts the partners for their lies.

Bharati has a neighbor, Tilak, who is unemployed, and lives with his mother, Sharda, who works as a maidservant in Dhanraj's house. Later he is hired as a manager in Dharamraj industries and obstructs the three partners' criminal activities.

Rajeshwar is impressed by Tilak's sincerity. Meanwhile, Tilak falls in love with the Dhanraj's daughter, Rani. Dharamraj accidentally meets Sharda and realizes that Tilak is his long-lost nephew. Dharamraj tells Rajeshwar the history of his family and how Tilak is related to him. Then Dharamraj is killed, and the evidence points towards Tilak and he has to gather evidence to prove his innocence.

== Cast ==
- Jeetendra as Tilak
- Rajesh Khanna as Rajeshwar
- Jaya Prada as Rani
- Sridevi as Bharati
- Waheeda Rehman as Sharda
- Prem Chopra as Dhanraj
- Ranjeet as Naagendra
- Shakti Kapoor as Naagpal
- Kader Khan as Naaglingam
- Amjad Khan as Bicchu Reddy
- Om Shivpuri as Dharamraj
- Shreeram Lagoo as Master Vishnu Pratap
- Asrani as Bhagwandas
- Iftekhar as Doctor
- Shatrughan Sinha as Satyajeet, Rajeshwar's father, Sharda's husband and Dharamraj's diseased brother (Guest appearance)

== Soundtrack ==
Lyrics: Indeevar

Song	Singer
"O Devi, O Baby"	Kishore Kumar
"Gussa Chhod, Dil Na Tod"	Kishore Kumar
"Aa Jao, Naagraja Tum Aa Jao"	Kishore Kumar
"Haay Haay Haay, Garmi Hai, Kahan Hai, Saanson Mein"	Kishore Kumar, S. Janaki
"Pyar Tumne Kiya Na Ho To Humse Shuruaat Karo"	Kishore Kumar, Asha Bhosle
"Laachari Ko, Majboori Ko"	Asha Bhosle
"Laachari Ko, Majboori Ko" (Short)	Asha Bhosle
