= Taqdeerwala =

- Poster
- Directed by: K. Murali Mohana Rao
- Written by: Kader Khan (dialogues)
- Screenplay by: K. Murali Mohana Rao
- Story by: S.V. Krishna Reddy
- Based on: Yamaleela (1994)
- Produced by: D. Rama Naidu
- Starring: Venkatesh; Raveena Tandon; Asrani; Kader Khan; Anupam Kher; Shakti Kapoor
- Cinematography: K. Ravindra Babu
- Edited by: K.A. Martand
- Music by: Anand–Milind
- Production company: Suresh Productions
- Release date: 12 May 1995
- Running time: 162 minutes
- Country: India
- Language: Hindi
- Budget: ₹2.75 crore (equivalent to ₹16 crore or US$1.9 million in 2023)
- Box office: ₹5.76 crore (equivalent to ₹34 crore or US$4.1 million in 2023)

Taqdeerwala (transl. The Fortunate Man) is a 1995 Indian Hindi-language fantasy action comedy film produced by D. Rama Naidu under the Suresh Productions banner, directed by K. Murali Mohana Rao. It stars Venkatesh and Raveena Tandon, with music composed by Anand–Milind. It is a remake of the 1994 Telugu film Yamaleela.

Despite being a failure, the film was a cult hit after being telecasted on television.

== Plot ==
Suraj is a mischievous man and his mother is disappointed with his behavior. Suraj learns of his mother's past, and that his father is a Zamindar and owner of a palace called Swarna Palace, who died because of debts and they lost their entire property. Suraj swears on his mother to again buy their palace in any circumstances and make his mother happy. Lilly is a petty thief, a greedy woman and Suraj falls in love with her at first sight, but she rejects him. Chhota Ravan, a rowdy opponent to Lilly, often teases Suraj and he falls sick.

Meanwhile, in hell, Yamraj (God of death) and Chitragupt misplace a book called Bhavishyavaani, which shows the future of man. The book somehow falls on the roof of Suraj's house, he benefits by reading predictions of the future in the book and becomes rich and Chhota Ravan is surprised how Suraj became rich in a short time. Lord Brahma warns Yamraj and Chitragupt that within one month they should find the book, otherwise they lose their supernatural powers. On earth, Suraj again buys their palace and takes his mother to it and he asks his mother if she wants anything else. She asks him to get married, so Suraj again opens the book to see whether his marriage will happen with Lilly or not. He then reads that his mother will die that night at 10 PM. To fulfill his mother's last wish, Suraj plays a marriage drama with Lilly, but accidentally his mother does not die and Lilly reveals all this drama which leads to his mother's anger and she stops talking to him until he really brings back Lilly as her daughter-in-law.

Meanwhile, Yamraj and Chitragupt reach Earth in search of the book. As they reach earth, they face many problems as everyone thinks of them as some drama company artists. Suraj saves them once and realizes that they are the real Yamraaj and Chitragupt and his mother didn't die because they do not have the book. To protect his mother, Suraj traps Yamraj with the help of a girl Lata. After some time, Yamraj learns the truth and also understands that the book is with Suraj. Yamraj asks him to give back the book, but he refuses. From that day, they try for the book in many ways but fail. One day Chhota Ravan beats Suraj very badly for the secret behind his success, but he doesn't reveal it. Yamraj saves him by calling Bruce Lee's soul into Suraj's body and asks him why all this. He says for his mother's sake, then Yamraj understands his devotion towards her. Yamraj wants to meet her, Suraj invites them to his house without knowing their real faces and accidentally Yamraj blesses Suraj's mother for complete life.

Meanwhile, Chhota Ravan wants to know the secret of Suraj's success, and he asks Lilly to go and find out the secret. Lilly plays a love drama with Suraj and asks him the secret, but he refuses to reveal it, she finally says he has to choose her or his mother, then without any hesitation, he chooses his mother and throws her out, and then she understands his affection towards his mother and his love towards her. Finally, Chhota Ravan kidnaps Suraj's mother and blackmails him for the book. Yamraj takes advantage of the situation and Suraj gives the book to Chhota Ravan. Yamraj destroys Chhota Ravan and collects the book. Finally, Yamraj comes to take Suraj's mother's life, but she has a complete life because of his blessings.

== Cast ==
- Venkatesh as Suraj
- Raveena Tandon as Lilly
- Kader Khan as Yamraj
- Asrani as Chitragupt
- Shakti Kapoor as Chhota Ravan
- Anupam Kher as Inspector Ranjit Singh
- Laxmikant Berde as Pandu
- D. Ramanaidu as Suraj's father
- Reema Lagoo as Suraj's mother
- Satyen Kappu as Gopal Kaka
- Tiku Talsania as Marwadi Seth
- Dinesh Hingoo as Editor
- Rakesh Pandey as Brahma
- Tisca Chopra as Lataa
- Amrut Patel
- Shashi Kiran
- Ghan Shyam
- Ashok Kumar as Dev Duth
- Chitti Babu
- Jenny as Constable
- Raja Shree
- Monika
- Neelima
- Malleswari
- Kalpila
- Lavanya

== Production ==
Five songs were shot in Mauritius with a crew of only nine people who used two baby lights and reflectors much to the dismay of Raveena Tandon.

== Soundtrack ==
Taqdeerwala

Film score by Anand–Milind
- Released: 1995
- Genre: Soundtrack
- Length: 38:33
- Label: Tips Audio with Tips Jhankar
- Producer: Anand–Milind

Anand–Milind chronology
Taaqat (1995)	Taqdeerwala (1995)	'Vapasi Saajan Ki' (1995)

Music was composed by Anand–Milind. Lyrics were written by Sameer. Music was released on TIPS Audio Company.

No.	Title	Singer(s)	Length
1.	"Aey Chhori Tu Tapori"	Kumar Sanu, Alka Yagnik	5:12
2.	"Char Bhaje Bagon Mein"	Udit Narayan, Sadhana Sargam	5:30
3.	"Aankhon Ka Kajal"	Udit Narayan, Alka Yagnik	4:44
4.	"Mera Dil Deewana"	Abhijeet Bhattacharya, Alka Yagnik	5:01
5.	"Dil Chura Ke Najaja"	Abhijeet Bhattacharya, Alka Yagnik	5:03
6.	"Phool Jaisi Muskaan"	Kumar Sanu, Sadhana Sargam	5:19
7.	"Sugswagtam Abhinandanam"	S. P. Balasubrahmanyam, Sadhana Sargam	4:42
8.	"Annarth Ho Anisth Ho"	S. P. Balasubrahmanyam	3:02
Total length:			38:33
