= Kodama Simham =

1990 Indian Telugu-language film

- Poster
- Directed by: K. Murali Mohana Rao
- Screenplay by: Paruchuri Brothers
- Story by: Ramaa Films Unit; Dhattha Brothers; Maraa
- Dialogues by: Satyanand
- Produced by: Kaikala Nageswara Rao
- Starring: Chiranjeevi; Sonam; Mohan Babu; Radha; Pran; Kannada Prabhakar
- Cinematography: K. S. Hari
- Edited by: Nageswara Rao; Satyanarayana
- Music by: Raj–Koti
- Production company: Ramaa Films
- Distributed by: Geetha Arts
- Release date: 9 August 1990
- Running time: 143 minutes
- Country: India
- Language: Telugu
- Budget: ₹4 crore

Kodama Simham (transl. The majestic lion) is a 1990 Indian Telugu-language revisionist adventure film directed by K. Murali Mohana Rao and produced by Kaikala Nageswara Rao. The film stars Chiranjeevi in the lead role, with Radha, Sonam, Mohan Babu, Pran, and Kaikala Satyanarayana in supporting roles. The music was composed by Raj–Koti.

Known for its grand scale and innovative approach, Kodama Simham was an ambitious production, made on a budget of ₹4 crore. The film received positive reviews for Chiranjeevi's performance, production values, music, and direction, becoming a commercial success. It ran for over 100 days in nearly 20 centres. The film was later dubbed into Hindi as Main Hoon Khiladiyon Ka Khiladi and into English as Hunters of the Indian Treasure.

== Plot ==
During British rule in India, criminal activities such as extortion, robbery, rape, and murder are rampant. Bharath, a rough-and-tough rancher with a heart of gold, lives in a boomtown filled with gun-slinging cowboys, outlaws, saloons, jailhouses, and liquor-fueled shootouts. When Bharath disrupts the gambling and prostitution operations of the corrupt mayor, the mayor's henchmen retaliate by fatally attacking Bharath's parents. As his father lies dying, he reveals that Bharath's real parents are still alive and advises him to seek them out.

Bharath's search leads him to his mother, who is imprisoned for a crime she did not commit. She explains that his father was falsely accused of stealing precious royal treasures and selling them to the British. Bharath eventually finds his father, who has been living as the leader of a group of tribal guerrilla fighters opposing the local government, the mayor, and the maharajas.

Bharath learns that the mayor, along with local zamindars and hooligans like Sudigali, had attempted to steal the treasure and the Kohinoor diamond while they were in the care of Bharath's father, who was serving as the maharajas' treasurer. His father, in an effort to protect the treasure, had hidden it and gone into hiding. Determined to clear his family's name, Bharath retrieves the treasure, restoring his family's honour.

== Cast ==
- Chiranjeevi as Bharath
- Radha as Bijili
- Sonam
- Mohan Babu as Sudigali
- Satyanarayana as Dharma Dev
- Pran as Mayor Ranjith
- Tiger Prabhakar as Gajapati
- Sudhakar as
- Vani Viswanath as bartender
- Ranganath as King
- Allu Ramalingaiah as bar owner
- Bramhanandam as constable
- Gollapudi Maruti Rao as Bharath's father
- Chalapathi Rao as Jailor
- Y. Vijaya as Prostitution Lady

== Production ==
=== Development ===
Kodama Simham was produced by Kaikala Nageswara Rao, under the presentation of his brother Kaikala Satyanarayana. Nageswara Rao decided to produce a cowboy film with Chiranjeevi in the lead role. Although Chiranjeevi was enthusiastic about the project, he cautioned that cowboy films would require a higher budget than typical productions. Undeterred, Nageswara Rao committed to the project and began searching for a director.

Nageswara Rao approached K. Murali Mohana Rao, a former classmate, to direct the film. After their collaboration on Sangharshana (1983), Chiranjeevi and K. Murali Mohana Rao reunited for Kodama Simham. The production team, comprising Nageswara Rao, Vijayendra Prasad, Siva Shakti Datta, and the Paruchuri Brothers, crafted a story that blended traditional cowboy themes with Indian cultural elements, resulting in a unique narrative tailored for Telugu cinema.

=== Casting ===
Chiranjeevi's casting as the cowboy protagonist was highly anticipated by his fans, who were eager to see him in a new avatar. Initially, Nadhiya was considered for one of the female leads, but due to her unavailability after her marriage, Hindi actress Sonam was cast instead. Radha and Vani Viswanath also played key roles in the film, completing the ensemble cast.

=== Filming ===
The production of Kodama Simham was ambitious, with filming taking place across five states, including locations in Madras, Ooty, Talakona, Mysore, Bangalore, Kochi, and Rajasthan. Elaborate sets were erected at Vauhini Studios in Madras to accommodate the film's cowboy theme and a special set was built in Chengalpattu, 64 kilometers from Madras, where a week of shooting was conducted. The extensive travel and elaborate sets underscored the large scale of the production, with the total budget reaching ₹4 crore—a significant investment at the time.

== Music ==
The music is composed by Raj–Koti. All songs are penned by Veturi.

| No. | Title | Singer(s) | Length |
|---|---|---|---|
| 1. | "Japam Japam" | S. P. Balasubrahmanyam, K. S. Chithra |
| 2. | "Chakkiliginthala Raagam" | S. P. Balasubrahmanyam, K. S. Chithra |
| 3. | "Gum Guma" | Mano, K. S. Chithra |
| 4. | "Allatappa Gongoorammo" | S. P. Balasubrahmanyam, K. S. Chithra |
| 5. | "Pillo Jaabillo" | Mano, K. S. Chithra |

== Reception ==
Kodama Simham was released three months after Chiranjeevi's blockbuster Jagadeka Veerudu Athiloka Sundari (1990), generating high anticipation. The film performed well at the box office and was praised for its production value and innovative approach.

Chiranjeevi's portrayal of the cowboy, which blended traditional Hollywood style with an appeal for Telugu audiences, was praised for bringing a fresh appeal to the genre. His distinct dance style also stood out. Mohan Babu was noted for his comedic role as the villain Sudigali, with his scenes alongside Chiranjeevi adding to the film's entertainment.

Griddaluri Gopalrao of Zamin Ryot gave a positive review, praising both Chiranjeevi's performance and the direction of the film.

== Legacy ==
In Magadheera (2009), for the scene where Kaala Bhairava (Ram Charan) falls into the sand and was rescued by his horse, Rajamouli took inspiration from this film where Bharath (Chiranjeevi) similarly falls into the sand and is rescued by his horse. However, Rajamouli expressed dissatisfaction with the scene from that film and modified it to include a portion where Bhairava expresses gratification to his horse.
