= Super Police =

- Theatrical poster
- Directed by: K. Murali Mohana Rao
- Written by: V. C. Guhanathan
- Produced by: D. Suresh
- Starring: Venkatesh; Nagma; Soundarya
- Music by: A. R. Rahman
- Production company: Suresh Productions
- Release date: 23 June 1994
- Running time: 150 minutes
- Country: India
- Language: Telugu

Super Police is a 1994 Indian Telugu-language action film produced by D. Suresh under the Suresh Productions banner, directed by K. Murali Mohana Rao. The film stars Venkatesh, Nagma and Soundarya, with music composed by A. R. Rahman. The film was dubbed and released in Tamil with the same name. It was also dubbed into Hindi as Khel Khiladi Ka, which released in 1997.

== Plot ==
Vijay is an honest police inspector. His past love Bharathi, a journalist, died in a road accident. From that day, he became a drunkard. Vijay comes as a renter to the house of a journalist Renuka, who had been divorced from her abusive husband SP Prakash because of his immoral character and lives with her three children. Vijay comes closer to Renuka's family and develops an attachment to her children.

Abbanna is a big shot in society. He's an actor but soon becomes a director for the Telugu film industry. However, he employs much violence in his movies, which angers the producer, effecting his dismissal. He decides to become an MLA to gain support and help others so everyone thinks he is a great man, but he is actually a big smuggler and gangster and also has underground contacts with terrorists. The Home Minister and Prakash are also their henchmen. Roja, a petty thief falls in love with Vijay.

Vijay always gives a tough fight to Abbanna and his gang and also makes his daughter's marriage with her lover without his permission, due to which Abbanna develops an enmity against Vijay. Meanwhile, Vijay gathers proof against Abbanna and his gang with Renuka's help, so Abbanna and his gang plan to kill Vijay. Abbanna puts a bomb in Vijay's house, but unfortunately, Renuka dies in the bomb blast. In anger for that, Vijay shows his violence against Abbanna and gang while they are doing a ceremonial ritual. That leads to his suspension. At the same time, Prakash throws out his three children from their house, and Vijay adopts them. Suddenly, Abbanna and gang attack Vijay, beat him very badly, and he is hospitalized. Roja takes care of Vijay and children, and he too starts loving her.

After the speedy recovery, Vijay spots a handicapped person Ebrahim, who shoots Abbanna in an attempt to kill him. When Abbanna's men encounter Ebrahim, Vijay stonewalls him. Vijay inquires Ebrahim regarding his animosity towards Abbanna, then Ebrahim reveals the past. Two years back, he was a watchman in Abbanna's factory. One day, he observes Abbanna's secret operations with terrorists and informs the police and press. Meanwhile, Abbanna kills Ebrahim's family and makes him handicapped; incidentally, Bharathi arrives there and covers the entire episode on video. They chase and kill her and created it as an accident, then Vijay understands that Bharathi didn't die in an accident and he also learns she has secretly hidden the video cassette. Vijay succeeds in acquiring the cassette. Abbanna learns of this, so he kidnaps the children and blackmails Vijay for the video cassette. Finally, Vijay protects the children, snaps all the baddies, hands over them to police, is rehired, and marries Roja.

== Cast ==
- Venkatesh as Inspector Vijay
- Nagma as Roja (Voice Dubbed by Roja Ramani )
- Soundarya as Bharathi (Voice Dubbed by Shilpa)
- Kota Srinivasa Rao as Abbanna
- Jayasudha as Journalist Renuka
- Brahmanandam as Citizen
- Ali as Constable
- AVS as Constable
- Ahuti Prasad as S.P. Prakash
- Chalapathi Rao as Home Minister
- Rallapalli as Pothuraju
- Jenny as Prisoner
- D. Ramanaidu as himself
- Kazan Khan as Terrorist Khan
- Siva Krishna as Ebrahim
- Devadas Kanakala as I.G. Prakash Rao
- Kota Shankar Rao as Thief
- Ashok Kumar as Constable
- Vidya Sagar as Intelligence Officer Rajendra Varma
- Ananth as Priest
- Annuja as Sandhya
- Master Baladitya as Sunny
- Master Avinash as Bunny
- Baby Nikitha as Nanny

== Soundtrack ==
Super Police

Soundtrack album by A. R. Rahman
- Released: 1994
- Recorded: Panchathan Record Inn
- Genre: Film soundtrack
- Length: 25:50
- Label: Suresh Productions
- Producer: V. C. Guhanathan

A. R. Rahman chronology
Vandicholai Chinraasu (1994)	Super Police (1994)	Duet (1994)

The soundtrack was composed by A. R. Rahman and was released on Magna Sound Music Company. This was Rahman's first straight Telugu film and is among only three straight Telugu films he ever did that are not remakes or bilinguals. The song "Babu Love Cheyyara" was later reused by Rahman as "Yaaro Sunlo Zara" in Rangeela (1995).

Telugu version (Super Police)
No.	Title	Lyrics	Singer(s)	Length
1.	"Super Police"	Veturi	Suresh Peters, Anupama, Swarnalatha	5:40
2.	"Baboo Love Cheyyara"	Veturi	S. P. Balasubrahmanyam, K. S. Chithra	5:07
3.	"Telu Kuttina Thenalilo"	Veturi	Mano, Sujatha, Suresh Peters (Humming)	4:48
4.	"Pakka Gentleman Ni"	Veturi	S. P. Balasubrahmanyam, S. Janaki	5:31
5.	"Mukkambe Mukkambe"	Veturi, Sahiti	Mano, K. S. Chithra	4:27
Total length:				25:50

Tamil version (Super Police)

All lyrics written by Vairamuthu, all music composed by A. R. Rahman.

Song	Artist(s)	Length
"Sundara En Sundara"	Swarnalatha, Anupama, Suresh Peters	5:40
"Maamo Love"	S. P. Balasubrahmanyam, K. S. Chithra	5:07
"Chinnakuttiyo Chingariyo"	Mano, Sujatha, Suresh Peters (Humming)	4:48
"Pakka Gentleman"	S. P. Balasubrahmanyam, S. Janaki	5:31
"Muthamma Muthamma"	Mano, K. S. Chithra	4:27

Hindi (Khel Khiladi Ka)

All lyrics written by Mehboob and P. K. Mishra, all music composed by A. R. Rahman.

Song	Artist(s)	Length
"Khel Hai Yeh"	Shweta Shetty, Suresh Peters, Swarnalatha	5:40
"Babu Lo Chal Gaya"	S. P. Balasubrahmanyam, Kavita Krishnamurthy, A. R. Rahman	5:07
"Dil Se Dil Zara Mila Hi Lo"	Udit Narayan, Alka Yagnik, Suresh Peters (Humming)	4:48
"Pakka Dilbar Jaani"	Hariharan, Asha Bhonsle	5:31
"Chumma De Chumma De"	S. P. Balasubrahmanyam, K. S. Chithra	4:27
