= Dilwaala =

- Promotional Poster
- Directed by: K. Murali Mohana Rao
- Written by: Paruchuri Brothers; Kader Khan
- Produced by: D. Rama Naidu; T. Subbarami Reddy
- Starring: Mithun Chakraborty; Meenakshi Sheshadri; Smita Patil
- Cinematography: S. Gopala Reddy
- Music by: Bappi Lahiri
- Production company: Suresh Productions
- Release date: 7 February 1986
- Running time: 135 minutes
- Country: India
- Language: Hindi

Dilwaala is a 1986 Indian Hindi-language film directed by K. Murali Mohana Rao, starring Mithun Chakraborty, Meenakshi Sheshadri, Smita Patil in lead roles. The film was a remake of Telugu film Kathanayakudu (1984).the film was a successful

== Plot ==
Ravi and his sister Judge Sumitra Devi never see eye to eye. MLA Raj Shekhar's son Raghu marries the poor Kamla at his father's behest. But not liking her, Raghu tortures and later kills Kamla. The father does his best to ensure his son does not pay for his crimes. The drama unfolds in court in the presence of Judge Sumitra Devi and amid the role played by Ravi.

== Soundtrack ==
Lyrics: Indeevar

Song	Singer
"Duniya Dushman Bane"	Kishore Kumar
"Saath Saath Rehna Mere Saari Zindagi"	Kishore Kumar, Asha Bhosle
"Chor Ko Pakdo, Zor Se Pakdo, Dekho Bhaag Chala"	Kishore Kumar, Asha Bhosle
"Tonight Pyar Karo, Tonight Pass Aao"	Nazia Hassan, Zohaib Hassan
"Abbai Abbai, Ammai Ammai"	Bappi Lahiri, S. Janaki

== Cast ==
- Mithun Chakraborty as Ravi Kumar
- Meenakshi Sheshadri as Padma
- Smita Patil as Sumitra, Ravi's elder sister
- Suresh Oberoi Madanlal Sharma, Sapna's father and Sumitra's husband
- Sarika as Sapna, Madanlal and Sumitra's daughter
- Arun Govil as Mohan Kumar, Ravi, Shanti and Sumitra's brother
- Asrani as Sub Inspector Sohan, Shanti's husband, Ravi's brother-in-law
- Aruna Irani as Shanti, Mohan, Ravi and Sumitra's sister
- Supriya Pathak as Kamla, Raghu's wife
- Gulshan Grover as Raghu, MLA's son
- Pran as MP Raj Shekhar, Raghu's father
- Kader Khan as MLA Sewakram Seetapuri, Padma's father
- Shakti Kapoor King Kong
- Goga Kapoor Randhir, as King Kong's brother in law
- Viju Khote as Grocer Damodar
- Dulari Chachi Sarla
- Shreeram Lagoo as Ganesh Vithal Kolhapure, Kamla's father
- Murad as Judge Khanna
- Raza Murad as Public Prosecutor Heeralal
- Paintal as Security Guard Narayan
- Renu Joshi as Mrs. Savitri Seetapuri, Padma's mother
- Bandini Mishra as Champa
