= Anari (1993 film) =

Indian romantic drama film by K. Murali Mohana Rao

- Movie Poster
- Directed by: K. Murali Mohana Rao
- Written by: Kamlesh Panday (dialogues)
- Screenplay by: K. Murali Mohana Rao
- Story by: P. Vasu
- Based on: Chinna Thambi (1991)
- Produced by: D. Rama Naidu
- Starring: Venkatesh; Karisma Kapoor
- Cinematography: K. Ravindra Babu
- Edited by: K.A. Martand
- Music by: Anand–Milind
- Production company: Suresh Productions
- Release date: 26 March 1993
- Running time: 171 mins
- Country: India
- Language: Hindi
- Box office: ₹3 crore (equivalent to ₹22 crore or US$2.3 million in 2023)

Anari (ISO: Anāṛī), (transl. Naive) is a 1993 Indian Hindi-language romantic drama film, produced by D. Rama Naidu under the Suresh Productions banner and directed by K. Murali Mohana Rao. The film stars Venkatesh (in his Hindi film debut) alongside Karisma Kapoor. The film emerged as a huge commercial success, and one of the highest-grossing films of the year.

It is a remake of the 1991 film Tamil film Chinna Thambi, which was first remade into Telugu as Chanti (1992), with Venkatesh reprising his role from the Telugu version.

Filmfare listed this film as being Karisma Kapoor's best film of the year 1993.

== Plot ==
Raj Nandini Singh (Karisma Kapoor) is born into a powerful zamindar family and raised by her three elder brothers after their parents' death. An astrologer predicts that she will choose her own husband, which leads her brothers to confine her upbringing and strictly control her interactions with men.

Rama (Venkatesh Daggubati), the son of a deceased village singer, grows up in modest circumstances with his widowed mother, Savitri (Raakhee Gulzar). After a confrontation with Nandini's bodyguards, he is hired by her brothers to serve as her personal attendant. Over time, Nandini persuades Rama to secretly show her the village. When she falls ill afterward, Rama is blamed and beaten by her brothers. The incident brings Nandini and Rama closer, and she develops feelings for him.

At a public event, Rama prevents an attempt on Nandini's life but is accused of inappropriate conduct due to a misunderstanding. Although the situation is clarified, he resigns because of the brothers' hostility. Nandini later convinces him to tie a mangalsutra around her neck, believing that marriage will secure his protection. Rama agrees without fully understanding the implications of the act.

As Nandini's brothers arrange another marriage for her, she insists that she is already married to Rama. Initially unaware of the validity of their union, Rama eventually accepts the situation. When the brothers discover the truth, conflict arises between the families. The confrontation escalates, but Rama ultimately rescues Nandini during a moment of crisis. The film ends with her recovery and reconciliation between the characters.

== Cast ==
- Venkatesh as Rama, a naïve and kind-hearted villager who is hired as Raj Nandini's bodyguard and later becomes central to the conflict between her and her brothers
- Karisma Kapoor as Raj Nandini Singh, the sheltered sister of three powerful zamindar brothers who struggles against their strict control over her life
- Raakhee Gulzar as Savitri, Rama's widowed mother
- Suresh Oberoi as Vikram Singh (Bhai Raja), Nandini's eldest brother
- Adi Irani as Mahendra Singh (Manjhle Raja), Nandini's second brother
- Gulshan Grover as Surendra Singh (Chhote Raja), Nandini's youngest brother
- Beena Banerjee as Manjula Singh, Vikram Singh's wife
- Sudha Rani as Sudha, Mahendra Singh's wife
- Johnny Lever as Bablu
- Laxmikant Berde as Raghu
- Subbiraj as Raj Jyotish, the family astrologer
- Raju Shrestha as a villager
- Priya Arun as Bijli
- Shubha Khote in a supporting role
- Dinesh Hingoo in a supporting role

== Soundtrack ==
Anari

Film score by Anand–Milind
- Released: 1993
- Genre: Soundtrack
- Length: 48:18
- Label: Tips Audio
- Producer: Anand–Milind

Anand–Milind chronology
| Sanam (1993) | Anari (1993) | Baarish (1993) |

Music composed by Anand–Milind. Lyrics written by Sameer. Music released on TIPS Audio Company.all the songs are popular

| No. | Title | Singer(s) | Length |
|---|---|---|---|
| 1. | "Phoolon Sa Chehra Tera" | Udit Narayan | 6:49 |
| 2. | "Kya Mausam Aaya Hai" | Udit Narayan, Sadhana Sargam | 6:21 |
| 3. | "Bum Akad Bum Ke" | Udit Narayan | 5:14 |
| 4. | "Choti Si Pyarisi Nanhisi" (Male) | Udit Narayan | 4:35 |
| 5. | "Jaane Jaan Jaane Jaan" (Female) | Sadhana Sargam | 5:03 |
| 6. | "Rona Chaahe Rona Paye" | Udit Narayan | 5:34 |
| 7. | "Choti Si Pyarisi Nanhisi" (Female) | Alka Yagnik | 4:43 |
| 8. | "Jaane Jaan Jaane Jaan" (Male) | Udit Narayan | 4:56 |
| 9. | "Pyar Mein Dil De Diya" | Kumar Sanu, Alka Yagnik | 5:49 |
| Total length: | | | 48:18 |
