= K. Murali Mohana Rao =

Indian film director

- Born: Andhra Pradesh, India
- Occupations: Film director; screenwriter; producer
- Years active: 1983–2009

K. Murali Mohana Rao is an Indian film director, and producer known for his works in Telugu, and Hindi language films. Rao made his feature film debut with the 1983 Telugu language action film Sangharshana, starring Chiranjeevi and Vijayashanti. In 1984 he scripted and directed the drama film Kathanayakudu, upon its success, he remade it in Hindi as Dilwaala (1986).

He is known for works such as the western action film Kodama Simham (1990) which was simultaneously dubbed into English as Hunters Of The Indian Treasure and Hindi as Main Hoon Khiladiyon Ka Khiladi. The film received positive reviews and turned out to be a hit.

1991 musical hit film Prem Qaidi was a remake of the 1990 Telugu film Prema Khaidi and marked the feature film debut of actress Karishma Kapoor, 1993 romantic drama film Anari a bollywood remake of the 1991 Tamil film Chinna Thambi was also successful.

In 1994, he directed the Telugu film Super Police with Venkatesh in the lead. The film featured music by A. R. Rahman and was also the first Telugu film to feature an original soundtrack by the maestro. The film did not fare well at the box-office. His next, the fantasy action comedy filmTaqdeerwala (1995) was a remake of the 1994 Telugu film Yamaleela. In 2002 he directed Kya Yehi Pyaar Hai, a remake of the 1997 Tamil film Love Today which was a hit at the box office.

== Selected filmography ==
- Sangharshana (1983)
- Kathanayakudu (1984)
- Dilwaala (1986)
- Brahma Rudrulu (1986)
- Adavi Raaja (1986)
- Trimurtulu (1987)
- Ramudu Bheemudu (1988)
- Bharya Bartulu (1988)
- Rakhwala (1989)
- Dost (1989)
- Kodama Simham (1990)
- Prem Qaidi (1991)
- Anari (1993)
- Super Police (1994)
- Taqdeerwala (1995)
- Vijeta (1996)
- Bandhan (1998)
- Kahin Pyaar Na Ho Jaaye (2000)
- Kya Yehi Pyaar Hai (2002)
- Daddy Cool: Join the Fun (2009)
