= Brahma Rudrulu =

1986 film directed by K. Murali Mohan Rao

- Theatrical release poster
- Directed by: K. Murali Mohana Rao
- Written by: Paruchuri Brothers (story / dialogues)
- Screenplay by: K. Murali Mohan Rao
- Produced by: C. Aswini Dutt
- Starring: Akkineni Nageswara Rao; Venkatesh; Lakshmi; Rajani; Ranjini
- Cinematography: M. V. Raghu
- Edited by: Kotagiri Venkateswara Rao
- Music by: Chakravarthy
- Production company: Vyjayanthi Movies
- Release date: 14 November 1986
- Running time: 137 minutes
- Country: India
- Language: Telugu

Brahma Rudrulu is a 1986 Indian Telugu-language action film, produced by C. Aswini Dutt under Vyjayanthi Movies and directed by K. Murali Mohana Rao. It stars Akkineni Nageswara Rao, Venkatesh, Lakshmi, Rajani, Ranjini and music composed by Chakravarthy. The film was flop at the box office.

== Cast ==
- Akkineni Nageswara Rao as Justice Jagadish Chandra Prasad
- Venkatesh as Satya Prasad
- Lakshmi as Sujatha
- Rajani as Ganga
- Ranjani as Jyothi
- Paruchuri Gopala Krishna as Balagam Brahmaji
- Nutan Prasad as Chelamayah
- Prabhakar Reddy as Marideswara Rao
- Ranganath as Balaram
- Rallapalli as Ganga's Brother
- Benerjee as Balagam Raju
- Surya as Jagadesh Chandra Prasad's son-in-law
- Ramji as Ravi
- Raj Varma as Kotigadu
- Sumitra as Kanaka Durga
- Samyuktha as Nirmala
- Rajitha as Jagadish Chandra Prasad's daughter
- Mandakini as item number
- Gautham Raju as Jockey Shinde

== Crew ==
- Art: Bhaskar Raju
- Choreography: Raghu
- Fights: Super Subbarayan
- Story - Dialogues: Paruchuri Brothers
- Lyrics: Veturi
- Playback: S. P. Balasubrahmanyam, S. Janaki, P. Susheela
- Music: Chakravarthy
- Editing: Kotagiri Venkateswara Rao
- Cinematography: M. V. Raghu
- Producer: Ashwini Dutt
- Screenplay - Director: K. Murali Mohan Rao
- Banner: Vyjayanthi Movies
- Release Date: 14 November 1986

== Soundtrack ==
Brahma Rudrulu

Film score by Chakravarthy
- Released: 1986
- Genre: Soundtrack
- Length: 25:38
- Label: LEO Audio
- Producer: Chakravarthy

Chakravarthy chronology
Kaliyuga Pandavulu (1986)	Brahma Rudrulu (1986)	Captain Nagarjun (1986)

Music composed by Chakravarthy. Lyrics were written by Veturi. Music released on LEO Audio Company.

S. No.	Song title	Singers	length
1	"Bugga Gilluko"	S. P. Balasubrahmanyam, S. Janaki	4:30
2	"Koka Jaaripothe"	S. P. Balasubrahmanyam, P. Susheela	4:07
3	"O Jabili"	S. P. Balasubrahmanyam, P. Susheela	4:32
4	"Emma Emma"	S. P. Balasubrahmanyam, P. Susheela	4:13
5	"Taayilaalo Taayilaalo"	S. P. Balasubrahmanyam, P. Susheela	4:28
6	"O Nyaya Devatha"	S. P. Balasubrahmanyam	3:48
