= Bharatamlo Bala Chandrudu =

- Theatrical release poster
- Directed by: Kodi Ramakrishna
- Written by: Ganesh Patro (dialogues)
- Screenplay by: Kodi Ramakrishna
- Story by: Vietnam Veedu Sundaram
- Produced by: D. Kishore; Murali Mohan (presents)
- Starring: Nandamuri Balakrishna; Bhanupriya
- Cinematography: K. S. Hari
- Edited by: Suresh Tata
- Music by: Chakravarthy
- Production company: Jayabheri Art Productions
- Release date: 24 June 1988
- Running time: 140 minutes
- Country: India
- Language: Telugu

Bharatamlo Bala Chandrudu is a 1988 Telugu-language action film produced by D. Kishore under the Jayabheri Art Productions banner, presented by Murali Mohan and directed by Kodi Ramakrishna. It stars Nandamuri Balakrishna, Bhanupriya and music composed by Chakravarthy.

== Cast ==
- Nandamuri Balakrishna as Balachandra
- Bhanupriya as Bhanu
- Rao Gopal Rao as Govardhanam
- Suresh Oberoi as Prabhakar
- Murali Mohan as Inspector Ranjeeth Kumar
- Giri Babu as D.I.G. Gundu Rao
- Ranganath as DFO Chandra Shekar
- Jaya Sudha as Vijaya
- Rajyalakshmi as Sujatha
- Poornima as Venkatalakshmi
- Y. Vijaya

== Soundtrack ==
Bharatamlo Bala Chandrudu

Film score by Chakravarthy
- Released: 1988
- Genre: Soundtrack
- Length: 25:14
- Label: Cauvery Audio
- Producer: Chakravarthy

Chakravarthy chronology
Tiragabadda Telugubidda (1988)	Bharatamlo Bala Chandrudu (1988)	Ramudu Bheemudu (1988)

Music composed by Chakravarthy. Music released on Cauvery Audio Company.

S. No.	Song title	lyrics	Singers	length
1	"Porusham Naapallavi"	C. Narayana Reddy	S. P. Balasubrahmanyam	4:11
2	"Chilakamma Chettekki"	Veturi	S. P. Balasubrahmanyam, S. Janaki	4:06
3	"Ding Dong"	Veturi	S. P. Balasubrahmanyam, S. Janaki	4:20
4	"Jingidi Jingidi Siggullo"	Jonnavithhula	S. P. Balasubrahmanyam, S. Janaki	4:25
5	"Tangumani Mogindi Ganata"	Veturi	S. P. Balasubrahmanyam, P. Susheela	4:08
6	"Ye Laali Paadali"	Veturi	S. P. Balasubrahmanyam, P. Susheela	4:04

== Other ==
- VCDs and DVDs on — ADITYA Videos, Hyderabad
