= Trimurtulu =

- Theatrical release poster
- Directed by: K. Murali Mohana Rao
- Written by: Paruchuri Brothers
- Based on: Naseeb
- Produced by: T. Subbarami Reddy
- Starring: Venkatesh; Arjun; Rajendra Prasad; Shobana; Khushbu; Aswini
- Music by: Bappi Lahiri
- Production company: Maheswari Parameswari Productions
- Release date: 24 June 1987
- Running time: 145 minutes
- Country: India
- Language: Telugu

Trimurtulu is a 1987 Indian Telugu-language masala film, produced by T. Subbarami Reddy and directed by K. Murali Mohana Rao. The film stars Venkatesh, Arjun, Rajendra Prasad, Shobana, Khushbu and Aswini, with music composed by Bappi Lahiri. It is a remake of the Hindi film Naseeb (1981). The film was released on 24 June 1987, and performed average at the box office.

== Cast ==
- Venkatesh as Raja
- Arjun as Siva
- Rajendra Prasad as Sandeep
- Shobana as Latha
- Khushbu as Julie
- Aswini as Rani
- Rao Gopal Rao as Damodaram
- Satyanarayana as Ram Murthy
- Nutan Prasad as Kotaiah
- Bhimeswara Rao as Bhadraiah
- Anupam Kher as Don
- Allu Ramalingaiah as Drunkard
- Sudhakar as Ashok
- Nagesh as Ad Film Hero
- Balaji as Suresh
- Suthi Veerabhadra Rao as Principal
- Suthi Velu as Achary
- Peketi Sivaram as Ad Film Director
- Mada as Ad Film Director
- Chitti Babu as Robin
- Bob Christo as Fighter
- Ramji as John
- Thyagaraju as Agent KK
- K. K. Sarma as Masthan
- Dham as Hotel Server
- Sumitra as Mary
- Anitha as Malati
- Mamatha as Lecturer
- K. Vijaya as Shanti
- Master Satish as Young Raja
- Master Suresh as Young Siva

Cameo apparence Oke Maata Oke Baata

- Krishna
- Shoban Babu
- Chiranjeevi
- Nagarjuna
- Nandamuri Balakrishna
- Chandra Mohan
- Krishnam Raju
- Murali Mohan
- Gollapudi Maruthi Rao
- Padmanabham
- Kodi Ramakrishna
- Paruchuri Gopalakrishna
- Paruchuri Venkateswara Rao
- Vijaya Nirmala
- Vijayashanti
- Radhika
- Sharada
- Radha
- Sumalatha
- Jayamalini

== Soundtrack ==
Music was composed by Bappi Lahiri, and released via Lahari Music.

S. No.	Song title	Singers	Lyrics	length
1	"Oke Maata Oke Baata"	S. P. Balasubrahmanyam	Veturi	5:28
2	"Ayyayyo Ayyayyayyo"	S. P. Balasubrahmanyam, P. Susheela	Veturi	4:48
3	"Mangchaav Mangchaav"	S. P. Balasubrahmanyam, S. Janaki	Veturi	4:07
4	"SeethaaKaalam"	S. P. Balasubrahmanyam, P. Susheela	Veturi	3:45
5	"Ee Jeevitham"	S. P. Balasubrahmanyam, Mano, P. Susheela	Acharya Aatreya	5:11
6	"Bye Bye Bye"	S. P. Balasubrahmanyam, Mano, S. Janaki, P. Susheela, S. P. Sailaja	Veturi	7:00
