= Ramudu Bheemudu (1988 film) =

1988 Indian film by K. Murali Mohana Rao

- Theatrical release poster
- Directed by: K. Murali Mohana Rao
- Written by: Paruchuri Brothers (dialogues)
- Screenplay by: K. Murali Mohana Rao
- Story by: V. C. Guhanathan
- Produced by: C.H.V.V. Satyanarayana
- Starring: Nandamuri Balakrishna; Radha; Suhasini
- Cinematography: Nandamuri Mohana Krishna
- Edited by: Kotagiri Venkateswara Rao
- Music by: Chakravarthy
- Production company: Satyam Cine Enterprises
- Release date: 17 November 1988
- Running time: 141 minutes
- Country: India
- Language: Telugu

Ramudu Bheemudu is a 1988 Telugu-language drama film, produced by CHVV Satyanarayana under the Satyam Cine Enterprises banner and directed by K. Murali Mohana Rao. Starring Nandamuri Balakrishna, Radha, Suhasini and music composed by Chakravarthy.

== Plot ==
The film begins with Bhimudu, a night watch at Hindupur, who everyone admires and resides with his grandmother, Yashodamma, and sister, Kavita. He stands for righteousness and pillars his best friend Sagar, the MLA of the constitution. Plus, it counteracts the enormities of barbaric Tata Rao, an opposition leader, and his son Papa Rao. Besides, Ramudu, a callow identical to Bhimudu, spends his life jolly and is the only heir of business tycoon Rajashekaram. Suyodhana Rao is a sly and brutish brother of Ramudu's mother, Parvati, who is waiting for a spot to usurp his wealth by knitting his daughter Surpanaka with Ramudu. Tata Rao and Suyodhana Rao are partners in traffic in arms unbeknownst to Ramudu and Bhimudu. Swati, a benevolent secretary of Rajashekaram, lives with her father, Satyam, and Aunt Savitri. Ramudu falls for her at first sight itself. Therefore, he proceeded to the office with the pretext of meeting her. After a while, she, too, darlings and transforms him a lot, which envies Suyodhana Rao. Bhimudu constantly clashes with a plucky Manga, and they crush.

The government announces lands for those in need, which Tata Rao acts together to squat. With the aid of Bhimudu, Sagar successfully allocated the lands to the original. Begrudged Tata Rao intrigues and mingles Sagar when Bhimudu enrages, and the rift arises. At the same time, Bhimudu learns Kavita and Sagar's younger Raju are turtle doves, which he defies. So, they silently wedlock when Bhimudu quits her. Also, Suyodhana Rao acknowledges Ramudu's love affair and endangers Swati. At this point, Ramudu affirms to espouse Swati when Suyodhana Rao schemes by stating that Ramudu conceives Surpanaka. Swati also misconstrues him, exits the town, and reaches Sagar. Now, Rajashekaram forcibly attempts to nuptial Ramudu. As a result, he absconds and lands at Hindupur to find Swati's whereabouts. Simultaneously, Tata Rao ploys to murder Bhimudu, but unfortunately, they affront Ramudu. Anyhow, Bhimudu guards him, and both encounter each other. Soon after, Yashodhamma declares that the progeny of a single father spins rearwards.

Once, pregnant Savitri non-else Swathi's aunt gazes at the illegal acts of Suyodhana Rao, their manager in those days. Satyam, Rajashekaram's trustworthy driver, secures and shelters her. Promptly, Suyodhana Rao falsifies their elopement to Rajashekaram and instantly arranges his alliance with Parvati. Satyam and Savitri rushed to bar it, but Suyodhana Rao's stroke made them to admit in a hospital. Whereat, Savitri delivers Bhimudu, and Yashodamma is a nurse. Shortly, Suyodhana Rao gives one more hit, and they all split. As of today, Ramudu and Bhimudu join in cracking down on Suyodhana Rao. In the interim, Tata Rao backstabs Sagar, who admits fault and reconciles with Bhimudu. Before long, Bhimudu detects Savitri via Yashodamma, and Swati comprehends Ramudu's virtue.

At this point, Ramudu and Bhimudu swap when Bhimudu exposes Surpanaka's bogus charge with the aid of Manga. He confirms the actual killer as Papa Rao and splices them. Nowadays, Ramudu has turned into a bold training of Swati. Next, the Suyodhana Rao and Tata Rao cabal assassinated Sagar to incriminate Bhimudu, which imprisons Ramudu. Subsequently, Suyodhana Rao discovers the selfsameness of Ramudu and Bhimudu and the existence of Savitri when he informs us about what is happening to the original Bhimudu. During the judicial proceedings, he arrives to protect his sibling when the two confuse everything. Ergo, the brutal onslaughts abduct the entire family. Here, Bhimudu brings out the devilish shade of Suyodhana Rao and proves his mother's innocence. At last, Ramudu and Bhimudu become baddies when Parvati dies, entrusting Ramudu to Savitri. Finally, the movie ends on a happy note with the marriage of Ramudu to Swati and Bhimudu to Manga.

== Cast ==
- Nandamuri Balakrishna as Ramudu & Bheemudu (dual role)
- Radha as Manga
- Suhasini as Swathi
- Rao Gopal Rao as Suyodhana Rao
- Satyanarayana as Tata Rao
- Jaggayya as Raja Shekaram
- Sudhakar as Papa Rao
- Jaya Bhaskar as MLA Sagar
- Raj Varma
- Ramji as Raju
- Ram Jagan as Anji
- Sakshi Ranga Rao as Govindaiah
- Raavi Kondala Rao
- Vankayala Satyanayana as Satyam
- Bhimeswara Rao
- Chalapathi Rao as Pothuraju
- Chidatala Appa Rao as Chanti
- Chitti Babu as Chitti
- Annapurna as Savitri
- Srividya as Parvathi
- Malashri as Surpanaka
- Varalakshmi as Kavitha
- Nirmalamma as Yashodamma
- KK Sarma
- Potti Prasad
- Dham
- Ali
- Modhukuri Satyam

== Soundtrack ==
Ramudu Bheemudu

Film score by Chakravarthy
- Released: 1988
- Genre: Soundtrack
- Length: 25:43
- Label: Cauvery Audio
- Producer: Chakravarthy

Chakravarthy chronology
Bharatamlo Bala Chandrudu (1988)	Ramudu Bheemudu (1988)	Bhale Donga (1989)

Music was composed by Chakravarthy, and lyrics were written by Veturi. Music was released by Cauvery Audio Company.

S. No.	Song title	Singers	length
1	"Theerani Daham"	S. P. Balasubrahmanyam, S. Janaki	5:25
2	"Your Are A Bad Boy"	S. P. Balasubrahmanyam, S. Janaki	4:16
3	"Shindidi Lala"	S. P. Balasubrahmanyam, S. Janaki	4:22
4	"Thakadhimi Thakathai"	S. P. Balasubrahmanyam, S. Janaki	3:50
5	"Thakadhimi Thakathai"	S. P. Balasubrahmanyam, S. Janaki	3:39
6	"Bhale Bhal Bampar"	S. P. Balasubrahmanyam, P. Susheela	4:11
