= Kathanayakudu (1984 film) =

- Theatrical release poster
- Directed by: K. Murali Mohana Rao
- Screenplay by: K. Murali Mohana Rao
- Story by: Paruchuri Brothers
- Produced by: D. Ramanaidu
- Starring: Nandamuri Balakrishna; Vijayashanti
- Cinematography: S. Gopal Reddy
- Edited by: K. A. Marthand
- Music by: Chakravarthy
- Production company: Suresh Productions
- Release date: 14 December 1984
- Running time: 153 minutes
- Country: India
- Language: Telugu

Kathanayakudu (lit. Protagonist) is a 1984 Indian Telugu-language drama film produced D. Ramanaidu on Suresh Productions banner and directed by K. Murali Mohana Rao. Starring Nandamuri Balakrishna, Vijayashanti and music composed by Chakravarthy. The film was remade in Hindi as Dilwaala (1986)

== Cast ==
- Nandamuri Balakrishna as Ravi
- Vijayashanti as Padma
- Gollapudi Maruthi Rao as M.P.Chandra Sekhar Rao
- Sharada as Justice Rajeswari Devi
- Allu Ramalingaiyah as M.L.A. Kunti Kanakaiah
- Chandra Mohan as Mohan
- Nutan Prasad as S.I.
- Paruchuri Gopala Krishna as King Kong
- P. L. Narayana as Eedukondalu
- Devadasu Kanakala as Seshu
- KK Sarma as Watchman Narayana
- Chalapathi Rao as King Kong's brother-in-law
- Bhima Raju as Rowdy
- Balaji as Raghu
- Swapna as Saroja
- Shyamala Gowri as Kotamma
- Rajyalakshmi as Saraswathi
- Radha Kumari as Sujana
- Rama Prabha as Mahalakshmi
- Sujitha as Mahalakshmi's son(Child Artist)
- Nirmalamma as Bamma

== Soundtrack ==
Kathanayakudu

Film score by Chakravarthy
- Released: 1984
- Genre: Soundtrack
- Length: 19:43
- Label: AVM Audio
- Producer: Chakravarthy

Chakravarthy chronology
Bobbili Brahmanna (1984)	Kathanayakudu (1984)	Goonda (1984)

Music composed by Chakravarthy. Lyrics were written by Veturi. Music released on AVM Audio Company.

S.No	Song title	Singers	length
1	"Kokadabula Kokammo"	S. P. Balasubrahmanyam	4:14
2	"Prema Ekkada"	S. P. Balasubrahmanyam, P. Susheela	4:15
3	"Modhalettana Pooja"	S. P. Balasubrahmanyam, S. Janaki	2:46
4	"Dhora Muddu Pettanela"	S. P. Balasubrahmanyam, P. Susheela	4:13
5	"Idhemi Dhigulo Voyammo"	S. P. Balasubrahmanyam, P. Susheela	4:15
