= Naa Desam =

- Theatrical release poster
- Directed by: K. Bapayya
- Written by: Paruchuri Brothers(dialogues)
- Screenplay by: K. Bapayya
- Story by: Dindayal Sharma
- Based on: Laawaris (1981)
- Produced by: K. Devi Vara Prasad; S. Venkataratnam
- Starring: N. T. Rama Rao; Jayasudha
- Cinematography: S. Venkataratnam
- Edited by: Kotagiri Venkateswara Rao
- Music by: Chakravarthy
- Production company: Pallavi Devi Productions
- Release date: 27 October 1982
- Running time: 133 mins
- Country: India
- Language: Telugu

Naa Desam (transl. My Country) is a 1982 Indian Telugu-language film, directed by K. Bapayya and produced by K. Devi Vara Prasad and S. Venkataratnam. It stars N. T. Rama Rao and Jayasudha, with music composed by Chakravarthy. The film is a remake of the Hindi film Laawaris (1981).

== Plot ==
Left in the care of an alcoholic Kailasam (Prabhakar Reddy), a young orphan named Bharath wrestles with life at his young age. Years later, now a young man (N. T. Rama Rao), Bharath works for Prathap Rao (Satyanarayana) and is in love with Mohini (Jayasudha), who will not have anything to do with him due to his lack of ancestry. Bharath is determined to find out who his parents are, and the only one who can help him is the elusive, alcoholic and incoherent Kailasam.

== Cast ==
- N. T. Rama Rao as Bharath
- Jayasudha as Mohini
- Satyanarayana as Prathap Rao
- Jaggayya as Ananda Rao
- Giribabu as Kumar
- Prabhakar Reddy as Kailasam
- Allu Ramalingaiah as Kannaiah
- Padmanabham as Dr. Sarath
- Siva Krishna as Govindu
- P. L. Narayana as Basavaiah
- P. J. Sarma as Baba
- Suthi Velu as Minister Bullabbai
- Chalapathi Rao as Gandaiah
- Jamuna as Lakshmi
- Kanchana as Saraswati Devi
- Rajyalakshmi as Gauri
- Rohini as Sudha
- Silk Smitha as item number
- Radha Kumari as Mohini's grandmother
- Krishnaveni as Papa
- Kakinada Shymala as Ananda Rao's wife
- Master Harish as Young Bharath
- Baby Meena as Young Mohini

== Production ==
Principal photography began 22 July 1982 at Ramakrishna Studios, Hyderabad. The song sequences were filmed at Ooty within the span of five days. The shooting of the entire film was completed in 19 days, which was a record. Rama Rao was paid ₹ 24 lakh for the film, which was a huge remuneration at the time. This film has a few scenes where Rama Rao did not dub in his own voice which had become hoarse due to addressing a large number of political gatherings; instead Paruchuri Gopalakrishna dubbed for Rama Rao in those scenes.

== Soundtrack ==
The soundtrack was composed by Chakravarthy, with lyrics by Veturi. It consists of six songs, all of which were written within two days.

S. No.	Song title	Singers	length
1	"Nenokka Nethru Dhepam"	S. P. Balasubrahmanyam	4:15
2	"Chalapalilo"	S. P. Balasubrahmanyam, P. Susheela	4:47
3	"Ee Chempa"	S. P. Balasubrahmanyam, P. Susheela	4:21
4	"Premaku Perantamu"	S. P. Balasubrahmanyam, P. Susheela	4:31
5	"Rojulanni Maare"	S. P. Balasubrahmanyam	4:02
6	"Uvnadura Devudu"	Nandamuri Raja	4:24
