= Paruchuri brothers =

Indian screenwriting duo

Paruchuri Brothers
- Born: Paruchuri Venkateswara Rao; Paruchuri Gopala Krishna
- Occupations: Writer; Actor; Director; Professor
- Years active: 1978 – Present
- Parent(s): Paruchuri Raghavaiah, Paruchuri Hymavathamma

Paruchuri Venkateswara Rao (born 21 June 1944) and Paruchuri Gopala Krishna (born 25 September 1947), collectively referred to as the Paruchuri Brothers, are a screenwriting duo whose work is predominant as story writers, dialogue writers, actors, directors, poets, playwrights, and novelists in the Indian Telugu film industry.

They have written the stories and dialogues for over 358 films; to name a few E Charithra Ye Siratho, Naa Desam, Khaidi, Eenadu, Mundadugu, Bobbili Brahmanna, Prajaswamyam, Karthavyam, Varsham, Sarpayagam, Major Chandrakanth Samarasimha Reddy, Narasimha Naidu, Okkadu, Indra, Tagore, Manasantha Nuvve, Nee Sneham, Nuvvostanante Nenoddantana, Shankardada MBBS, Drushyam, Khaidi No. 150, Rudrama Devi and Sye Raa Narasimha Reddy.

== Filmography ==
=== As directors (1984 – Present) ===
In 1984, both the brothers decided to direct films and their first film as directors under Srinadh movies was Kai Raja Kai. Later they directed total of 9 films.

Year	Title	Language	Notes
1984	Kai Raja Kai	Telugu	
1985	Sri Katna Leelalu	Telugu	
1985	Bhale Thammudu	Telugu	
1987	Repati Swarajyam	Telugu	
1987	Prajaswamyam	Telugu	
1988	Maa Telugu Talli	Telugu	
1991	Sarpayagam	Telugu	
1994	Maro Quit India	Telugu	
1997	Singanna	Telugu	

=== As writers ===
Year	Film	Credits	Notes
2019 (2 Movies)	Sye Raa Narasimha Reddy	Story	
2019 (2 Movies)	Sita	Screenplay and script Coordination	
2018 (3 Movies)	Rangu	Dialogues	
2018 (3 Movies)	Ayushman Bhava	Screenplay	
2018 (3 Movies)	Gayathri	Story Development	
2017 (6 Movies)	Sapthagiri LLB	Dialogues	
2017 (6 Movies)	Oxygen	Dialogues	
2017 (6 Movies)	Kathalo Rajakumari	Script Coordination	
2017 (6 Movies)	Nene Raju Nene Mantri	Script Coordination	
2017 (6 Movies)	Jayadev	Screenplay, Dialogues	
2017 (6 Movies)	Khaidi No. 150	Script Co-ordinators	
2016 (2 Movies)	Siddhartha	Dialogues	
2016 (2 Movies)	Bramostavam	Script Co-ordinators	
2015 (2 Movie)	Rudhramadevi	Dialogues	
2015 (2 Movie)	Dynamite	Dialogues	
2014 (3 Movies)	Govindudu Andarivadele	Dialogues	
2014 (3 Movies)	Drushyam	Dialogues	
2014 (3 Movies)	Nenu Naa Friends	Dialogues	
2013 (1 Movie)	Akasamlo Sagam	Dialogues	
2012 (6 Movies)	Genius	Dialogues	
2012 (6 Movies)	Shirdi Sai	Dialogues	
2012 (6 Movies)	Tuneega Tuneega	Dialogues	
2012 (6 Movies)	Racha	Dialogues	
2012 (6 Movies)	Mr. Nookayya	Dialogues	
2012 (6 Movies)	Nandeeswarudu	Dialogues	
2011 (4 Movies)	Kshetram	Dialogues	
2011 (4 Movies)	Mr. Rascal	Dialogues	
2011 (4 Movies)	Nagaram Nidrapotunna Vela	Dialogues	
2011 (4 Movies)	Veera	Dialogues	
2010 (5 Movies)	Nagavalli	Dialogues	
2010 (5 Movies)	Manasara...	Dialogues	
2010 (5 Movies)	Aalasyam Amrutam	Dialogues	
2010 (5 Movies)	Collector Gari Bharya	Dialogues	
2010 (5 Movies)	Maa Annayya Bangaram	Dialogues	
2009 (5 Movies)	Mahatma	Dialogues	
2009 (5 Movies)	Junction	Dialogues	
2009 (5 Movies)	Neramu Siksha	Dialogues	
2009 (5 Movies)	Adhineta	Story, Dialogues	
2009 (5 Movies)	Maska	Dialogues	
2008 (4 Movies)	Rainbow	Dialogues	
2008 (4 Movies)	Baladoor	Dialogues	
2008 (4 Movies)	Gorintaku	Dialogues	
2008 (4 Movies)	Vaana	Dialogues	
2007 (8 Movies)	Anasuya	Screenplay	
2007 (8 Movies)	Godava	Dialogues	
2007 (8 Movies)	Tulasi	Dialogues	
2007 (8 Movies)	Vijayadasami	Dialogues	
2007 (8 Movies)	Shankar Dada Zindabad	Dialogues	
2007 (8 Movies)	Aata	Dialogues	
2007 (8 Movies)	Lakshmi Kalyanam	Dialogues	
2007 (8 Movies)	Evadaithe Nakenti	Dialogues	
2006 (5 Movies)	Sainikudu	Dialogues	
2006 (5 Movies)	Stalin	Dialogues	
2006 (5 Movies)	Astram	Dialogues	
2006 (5 Movies)	Pokiri	Script Coordination	
2006 (5 Movies)	Pournami	Dialogues	
2005 (8 Movies)	Allari Pidugu	Story, Screenplay, Dialogues	
2005 (8 Movies)	Andarivaadu	Dialogues	
2005 (8 Movies)	Political Rowdy	Dialogues	
2005 (8 Movies)	Narasimhudu	Dialogues	
2005 (8 Movies)	Subhash Chandra Bose	Dialogues	
2005 (8 Movies)	Soggadu	Screenplay	
2005 (8 Movies)	Sankranthi	Dialogues	
2005 (8 Movies)	Nuvvostanante Nenoddantana	Dialogues	
2004 (10 Movies)	Mass	Dialogues	
2004 (10 Movies)	Sakhiya	Dialogues	
2004 (10 Movies)	Suryam	Dialogues	
2004 (10 Movies)	Shankar Dada MBBS	Dialogues	
2004 (10 Movies)	Arjun	Dialogues	
2004 (10 Movies)	Naa Autograph	Dialogues	
2004 (10 Movies)	Adavi Ramudu	Dialogues	
2004 (10 Movies)	Nenunnanu	Story development, Dialogues	
2004 (10 Movies)	Lakshmi Narasimha	Story development, Dialogues	
2004 (10 Movies)	Varsham	Dialogues	
2003 (14 Movies)	Tiger Harischandra Prasad	Screenplay, Dialogues	
2003 (14 Movies)	Toli Choopulone	Dialogues	
2003 (14 Movies)	Vishnu	Dialogues	
2003 (14 Movies)	Tagore	Dialogues	
2003 (14 Movies)	Neeku Nenu Naaku Nuvvu	Dialogues	
2003 (14 Movies)	Ammulu	Screenplay	
2003 (14 Movies)	Palanati Brahmanaidu	Screenplay, Dialogues	
2003 (14 Movies)	Sambhavi IPS	Story, Dialogues	
2003 (14 Movies)	Taarak	Dialogues	
2003 (14 Movies)	Indiramma	Story, Dialogues	
2003 (14 Movies)	Okkadu	Dialogues	
2003 (14 Movies)	Naaga	Dialogues	
2002 (10 Movies)	Eeshwar	Dialogues	
2002 (10 Movies)	Siva Rama Raju	Dialogues	
2002 (10 Movies)	Nee Sneham	Dialogues	
2002 (10 Movies)	Chennakesava Reddy	Dialogues	
2002 (10 Movies)	Indra	Dialogues	
2002 (10 Movies)	Allari Ramudu	Story, Dialogues	
2002 (10 Movies)	Sreeram	Dialogues	
2002 (10 Movies)	Aadi	Dialogues	
2002 (10 Movies)	Nuvvu Leka Nenu Lenu	Dialogues	
2002 (10 Movies)	Seema Simham	Dialogues	
2001 (7 Movies)	Raa	Dialogues	
2001 (7 Movies)	Manasantha Nuvve	Dialogues, Screenplay	
2001 (7 Movies)	Adhipathi	Dialogues	
2001 (7 Movies)	Akasa Veedhilo	Dialogues	
2001 (7 Movies)	Simharasi	Dialogues	
2001 (7 Movies)	Pandanti Samsaram	Story, Dialogues	
2001 (7 Movies)	Narasimha Naidu	Dialogues	
2000 (11 Movies)	Durga	Dialogues	
2000 (11 Movies)	Jayam Manadera	Dialogues	
2000 (11 Movies)	Vamsi	Dialogues	
2000 (11 Movies)	Azad	Dialogues	
2000 (11 Movies)	Rayalaseema Ramanna Chowdary	Dialogues	
2000 (11 Movies)	Madhuri	Dialogues	
2000 (11 Movies)	Pelli Sambandham	Story of a Remake	
2000 (11 Movies)	Manasupaddanu Kaani	Dialogues	
2000 (11 Movies)	Kalisundam Raa	Dialogues	
2000 (11 Movies)	Vamshoddharakudu	Story, Dialogues	
2000 (11 Movies)	Postman	Screenplay, Dialogues	
1999 (6 Movies)	Raja Kumarudu	Dialogues	
1999 (6 Movies)	Sultan	Story development, Dialogues	
1999 (6 Movies)	Yamajathakudu	Story, Dialogues	
1999 (6 Movies)	Samarasimha Reddy	Dialogues	
1999 (6 Movies)	Peddamanushulu	Dialogues	
1999 (6 Movies)	Sneham Kosam	Dialogues	
1998 (7 Movies)	Premante Idera	Dialogues	
1998 (7 Movies)	Sri Ramulayya	Dialogues	
1998 (7 Movies)	Eswar Allah	Dialogues	
1998 (7 Movies)	Ganesh	Dialogues	
1998 (7 Movies)	Yuvarathna Rana	Dialogues	
1998 (7 Movies)	Bavagaru Bagunnara?	Screenplay, Dialogues	
1998 (7 Movies)	Khaidi Garu	Dialogues	
1997 (7 Movies)	Sainikudu	Dialogues	
1997 (7 Movies)	Collector Garu	Dialogues	
1997 (7 Movies)	Singanna	Story, Screenplay, Dialogues	
1997 (7 Movies)	Preminchukundam Raa	Dialogues	
1997 (7 Movies)	Bobbili Dora	Story, Dialogues	
1997 (7 Movies)	Peddannayya	Story, Dialogues	
1997 (7 Movies)	Adavilo Anna	Story, Screenplay, Dialogues	
1996 (6 Movies)	Rendu Kutumbala Katha	Dialogues	
1996 (6 Movies)	Tata Manavadu	Story, Dialogues	
1996 (6 Movies)	Nayudugari Kutumbam	Dialogues	
1996 (6 Movies)	Puttinti Gouravam	Dialogues	
1996 (6 Movies)	Sahasa Veerudu Sagara Kanya	Story, Dialogues	
1996 (6 Movies)	Vamshanikokkadu	Story, Dialogues	
1995 (7 Movies)	Shiva	Story	Kannada film
1995 (7 Movies)	Telugu Veera Levara	Story, Dialogues	
1995 (7 Movies)	Dorababu	Story, Dialogues	
1995 (7 Movies)	Real Hero	Story, Dialogues	
1995 (7 Movies)	Street Fighter	Story, Dialogues	
1995 (7 Movies)	Sankalpam	Dialogues	
1995 (7 Movies)	Pokiri Raja	Dialogues	
1994 (9 Movies)	Aavesam	Dialogues	
1994 (9 Movies)	Bobbili Simham	Dialogues	
1994 (9 Movies)	Yes Nenante Nene	Dialogues	
1994 (9 Movies)	Gangmaster	Dialogues	
1994 (9 Movies)	Doragariki Dongapellam	Dialogues	
1994 (9 Movies)	S.P. Parasuram	Dialogues	
1994 (9 Movies)	Jailor Gaari Abbayi	Story, Screenplay, Dialogues	
1994 (9 Movies)	Maro Quit India	Story, Screenplay, Dialogues	
1994 (9 Movies)	Todikodallu	Story, Dialogues	
1993 (11 Movies)	Kunti Putrudu	Dialogues	
1993 (11 Movies)	Rowdy Mogudu	Screenplay, Dialogues	
1993 (11 Movies)	Nippu Ravva	Story, Dialogues, Screenplay	
1993 (11 Movies)	Mogudugaru	Story, Dialogues, Screenplay	
1993 (11 Movies)	Kondapalli Raja	Dialogues	
1993 (11 Movies)	Inspector Jhansi	Story, Dialogues, Screenplay	
1993 (11 Movies)	Ratha Sarathi	Dialogues	
1993 (11 Movies)	Major Chandrakanth	Story, Dialogues	
1993 (11 Movies)	Aashayam	Story, Screenplay, Dialogues	
1993 (11 Movies)	Chittemma Mogudu	Screenplay, Dialogues	
1993 (11 Movies)	Mutha Mestri	Screenplay, Dialogues	
1992 (14 Movies)	Sundarakanda	Dialogues	
1992 (14 Movies)	Collector Gari Alludu	Dialogues	
1992 (14 Movies)	Prema Vijetha	Dialogues	
1992 (14 Movies)	Chinarayudu	Dialogues	
1992 (14 Movies)	Mother India	Story, Dialogues, Screenplay	
1992 (14 Movies)	Peddarikam	Dialogues	
1992 (14 Movies)	Brahma	Dialogues	
1992 (14 Movies)	Rowdy Inspector	Dialogues	
1992 (14 Movies)	Gharana Mogudu	Dialogues	
1992 (14 Movies)	Moratodu Naa Mogudu	Dialogues	
1992 (14 Movies)	Champion	Story, Dialogues	
1992 (14 Movies)	Dharma Kshetram	Story, Dialogues	
1992 (14 Movies)	Rakthatharpanam	Dialogues	
1992 (14 Movies)	Pranadata	Story, Dialogues	
1991 (15 Movies)	Prayatnam	Dialogues	
1991 (15 Movies)	Sarpayagam	Story, Dialogues, Screenplay	
1991 (15 Movies)	Aagraham	Dialogues	
1991 (15 Movies)	Rowdy Gaari Pellam	Story, Dialogues	
1991 (15 Movies)	Surya IPS	Story, Dialogues	
1991 (15 Movies)	Prema Panjaram	Dialogues, Screenplay	
1991 (15 Movies)	Jagannatakam	Story, Dialogues	
1991 (15 Movies)	Coolie No. 1	Story, Dialogues	
1991 (15 Movies)	Gang Leader	Dialogues	
1991 (15 Movies)	Assembly Rowdy	Screenplay, Dialogues	
1991 (15 Movies)	People's Encounter	Dialogues	
1991 (15 Movies)	Talli Tandrulu	Story, Dialogues	
1991 (15 Movies)	Kadapa Reddemma	Story, Dialogues, Screenplay	
1991 (15 Movies)	Prema Khaidi	Story, Dialogues	
1991 (15 Movies)	Stuartpuram Police Station	Screenplay	
1990 (14 Movies)	Majboor	Story, Screenplay	Hindi film
1990 (14 Movies)	Lorry Driver	Dialogues	
1990 (14 Movies)	Doshi Nirdoshi	Story, Dialogues, Screenplay	
1990 (14 Movies)	Doctor Bhavani	Dialogues	
1990 (14 Movies)	Vishnu	Dialogues	
1990 (14 Movies)	Bobbili Raja	Story, Dialogues	
1990 (14 Movies)	Kodama Simham	Screenplay	
1990 (14 Movies)	Aadadi	Story, Dialogues	
1990 (14 Movies)	Kartavyam	Story, Dialogues	
1990 (14 Movies)	Ayudham	Story, Dialogues	
1990 (14 Movies)	Aggiramudu	Dialogues	
1990 (14 Movies)	Balachandrudu	Dialogues	
1990 (14 Movies)	Kondaveeti Donga	Story, Dialogues	
1990 (14 Movies)	Judgment	Dialogues	
1989 (12 Movies)	Indrudu Chandrudu	Story, Dialogues	
1989 (12 Movies)	Koduku Diddina Kapuram	Dialogues	
1989 (12 Movies)	Black Tiger	Script helping	
1989 (12 Movies)	Dhruva Nakshatram	Story, Dialogues	
1989 (12 Movies)	Ashoka Chakravarthy	Dialogues	
1989 (12 Movies)	Mouna Poratam	Dialogues, Screenplay	
1989 (12 Movies)	Raktha Kanneru	Story, Dialogues, Screenplay	
1989 (12 Movies)	Pardhudu	Dialogues	
1989 (12 Movies)	State Rowdy	Story, Dialogues	
1989 (12 Movies)	Vicky Daada	Screenplay	
1989 (12 Movies)	Manchi Kutumbam	Dialogues	
1989 (12 Movies)	Vijay	Story, Dialogues	
1988 (12 Movies)	Ramudu Bheemudu	Dialogues	
1988 (12 Movies)	Mugguru Kodukulu	Dialogues	
1988 (12 Movies)	Agni Keratam	Dialogues	
1988 (12 Movies)	Maa Telugu Talli	Story, Dialogues, Screenplay	
1988 (12 Movies)	Aswaddhama	Story, Dialogues	
1988 (12 Movies)	Rowdy No 1	Dialogues	
1988 (12 Movies)	Chattamtho Chadarangam	Dialogues	
1988 (12 Movies)	Tiragabadda Telugubidda	Story, Dialogues	
1988 (12 Movies)	Chinababu	Story, Dialogues	
1988 (12 Movies)	Donga Ramudu	Dialogues	
1988 (12 Movies)	Raktha Tilakam	Dialogues	
1988 (12 Movies)	Kaliyuga Karnudu	Dialogues	
1987 (19 Movies)	Prajaswamyam	Story, Dialogues, Screenplay	
1987 (19 Movies)	Nyayaniki Sankellu	Dialogues	
1987 (19 Movies)	Bhanumati Gari Mogudu	Dialogues, Kadhasamvidhanam	
1987 (19 Movies)	Maa Oori Magaadu	Story, Dialogues	
1987 (19 Movies)	Samrat	Dialogues	
1987 (19 Movies)	Dammit Katha Addam Thirigindi	Story, Dialogues	
1987 (19 Movies)	Agni Putrudu	Story, Dialogues	
1987 (19 Movies)	Sankharavam	Story, Dialogues	
1987 (19 Movies)	Muddayi	Dialogues	
1987 (19 Movies)	Trimurtulu	Dialogues	
1987 (19 Movies)	Makutamleni Maharaju	Story, Dialogues	
1987 (19 Movies)	Sardar Krishnamanaidu	Story, Dialogues	
1987 (19 Movies)	Bharatamlo Arjunudu	Dialogues	
1987 (19 Movies)	Repati Swarajyam	Screenplay, Dialogues	
1987 (19 Movies)	President Gari Abbai	Story, Dialogues	
1987 (19 Movies)	Karthika Pournami	Story, Dialogues	
1987 (19 Movies)	Lawyer Bharathidevi	Story, Dialogues	
1987 (19 Movies)	Bhargava Ramudu	Story co-ordination, Dialogues	
1987 (19 Movies)	Thandri Kodukula Challenge	Dialogues	
1986 (15 Movies)	Guru Brahma	Dialogues	
1986 (15 Movies)	Chanakya Sapadham	Story, Dialogues	
1986 (15 Movies)	Jailu Pakshi	Dialogues	
1986 (15 Movies)	Brahma Rudrulu	Story, Dialogues	
1986 (15 Movies)	Kaliyuga Krishnudu	Dialogues	
1986 (15 Movies)	Aadapaduchu	Story, Dialogues, Lyrics	
1986 (15 Movies)	Kaliyuga Pandavulu	Story, Dialogues	
1986 (15 Movies)	Ravana Brahma	Story, Dialogues	
1986 (15 Movies)	Anasuyamma Gari Alludu	Story, Dialogues	
1986 (15 Movies)	Kaidi Rudrayya	Story, Dialogues	
1986 (15 Movies)	Veta	Dialogues	
1986 (15 Movies)	Pratidhvani	Story, Dialogues	
1986 (15 Movies)	Kondaveeti Raja	Story, Dialogues	
1986 (15 Movies)	Jayam Manade	Story, Dialogues	
1986 (15 Movies)	Bhale Mithrulu	Dialogues	
1985 (11 Movies)	Pattabhishekam	Story, Dialogues	
1985 (11 Movies)	Adavi Donga	Story, Dialogues	
1985 (11 Movies)	Vajrayudham	Story, Dialogues	
1985 (11 Movies)	Palnati Simham	Story, Dialogues	
1985 (11 Movies)	Bhale Thammudu	Story, Dialogues, Screenplay	
1985 (11 Movies)	Terror	Dialogues	
1985 (11 Movies)	Donga	Dialogues	
1985 (11 Movies)	Maha Sangramam	Story, Dialogues	
1985 (11 Movies)	Sri Katna Leelalu	Story, Dialogues, Screenplay	
1985 (11 Movies)	Chattamtho Poratam	Story, Dialogues	
1985 (11 Movies)	Agni Parvatham	Story, Dialogues	
1984 (15 Movies)	Rowdy	Story, Dialogues	
1984 (15 Movies)	Kathanayakudu	Story, Dialogues	
1984 (15 Movies)	Palnati Puli	Dialogues	
1984 (15 Movies)	Gharana Rowdy	Story, Dialogues	
1984 (15 Movies)	Nagu	Dialogues	
1984 (15 Movies)	Intiguttu	Dialogues	
1984 (15 Movies)	Uddandudu	Story, Dialogues	
1984 (15 Movies)	Raraju	Dialogues	
1984 (15 Movies)	Dandayatra	Story, Dialogues	
1984 (15 Movies)	Kai Raja Kai	Story, Dialogues, Lyrics	
1984 (15 Movies)	Bobbili Brahmanna	Story, Dialogues	
1984 (15 Movies)	Rojulu Marayi	Story, Dialogues	
1984 (15 Movies)	Babulu Gadi Debba	Dialogues	
1984 (15 Movies)	Tandava Krishnudu	Dialogues	
1984 (15 Movies)	Sardar	Dialogues	
1983 (20 Movies)	Sangharshana	Dialogues	
1983 (20 Movies)	Poratam	Dialogues	
1983 (20 Movies)	Khaidi	Story, Dialogues	
1983 (20 Movies)	Kala Yamudu	Dialogues	
1983 (20 Movies)	Praja Rajyam	Story, Dialogues	
1983 (20 Movies)	Rakasi Loya	Dialogues	
1983 (20 Movies)	Ee Pillaku Pellavuthunda?	Story, Dialogues	
1983 (20 Movies)	Roshagadu	Dialogues	
1983 (20 Movies)	Durgadevi	Dialogues	
1983 (20 Movies)	Mayagadu	Dialogues	
1983 (20 Movies)	Aapadbandhavulu	Dialogues	
1983 (20 Movies)	Siripuram Monagadu	Dialogues	
1983 (20 Movies)	Chandasasanudu	Story, Dialogues	
1983 (20 Movies)	Mugguru Monagallu	Dialogues	
1983 (20 Movies)	Chattaniki Veyikallu	Dialogues	
1983 (20 Movies)	Ee Desamlo Okaroju	Dialogues	
1983 (20 Movies)	Simham Navvindi	Dialogues	
1983 (20 Movies)	Mundadugu	Story, Dialogues	
1983 (20 Movies)	Idi Kaadu Mugimpu	Lyrics, Dialogues	
1983 (20 Movies)	Bezawada Bebbuli	Story, Dialogues	
1982 (8 Movies)	Eenadu	Dialogues	
1982 (8 Movies)	Saval	Dialogues	
1982 (8 Movies)	Illali Korikalu	Dialogues	
1982 (8 Movies)	Naa Desam	Dialogues	
1982 (8 Movies)	E Charitra Ye Siratho	Story, Dialogues	
1982 (8 Movies)	Pellilla Perayya	Dialogues	
1982 (8 Movies)	Maro Malupu	Lyrics, Dialogues	
1982 (8 Movies)	Anuragadevata	Dialogues	
1981 (2 Movies)	Maro Kurukshetram	Dialogues	
1981 (2 Movies)	Bhogabhagyalu	Lyrics	
1980 (4 Movies)	Manavude Mahaneeyudu	Dialogues, Lyrics	
1980 (4 Movies)	Samadhi Kadutunnam Chandalivvandi	Story, Dialogues	
1980 (4 Movies)	Badayi Basavaiah	Story, Dialogues	
1980 (4 Movies)	Samsara Bandham	Dialogues	
1979 (3 Movies)	Seethe Ramudaithe	Dialogues	
1979 (3 Movies)	Chaya	Dialogues	
1979 (3 Movies)	Kaliyuga Mahabharatam	Story, Dialogues	
1978 (1 Movie)	Chalicheemalu	Dialogues	

== Awards, honors and recognitions ==
Nandi Awards

1. Second Best Story Writer - Pratidhwani (1986)
2. Best Story Writer - Karthavyam (1990)
3. Best Story Writer - Aasayam (1993)
4. Best Supporting Actor for Paruchuri Venkateswara Rao - Aasayam (1993)
5. Best Dialogue Writer - Nayudugari Kutumbam (1996)
6. Best Dialogue Writer - Ganesh (1998)

=== Other Awards Best Dialogue Writers ===
1. 1982 Eenadu Sitara Award, Hyderabad
2. 1988 Prajaswamyam, Rasamayi, Tenali
3. 1990 Karthavyam, Kala Sagar Award, Madras
4. 1991 People's Encounter, Kala Sagar, Madras
5. 1992 Sundarakanda, Lalita Kala Sagar, Chittoor
6. 1992 Peddarikam, Lyrics Award, Madras
7. 1993 Kunthi Puthrudu, Vamsi Berkley Award, Hyderabad
8. 1993 Major Chandrakanth, Kalasagar, Madras
9. 1996 Nayudugari Kutumbam, A.P. State Nandi Award
10. 1998 Ganesh, A.P. State Nandi Award
11. 1998 Ganesh, A.P. Cinegoers Award
12. 1998 Bavagaru Bagunnara, Vamsi Berkley Award
13. 1999 Samarasimha Reddy, AFJA Award
14. 1999 Samarasimha Reddy, Yuvakala Vahini Award
15. 1999 Samarasimha Reddy, A.P. Cinegoers Award
16. 2000 Azad, A.P. Cinegoers Award
17. 2001 Narasimha Naidu, Vamsi Directors Specials
18. 2002 Indra, A.P. Cinegoers Award
19. 2003 Tagore, A.P. Cinegoers Award
20. 2003 Tagore, Santosham Award
21. 2003 Tagore, Maa T.V. Award
22. 2003 Tagore, Bharatha Muni Award
23. 2004 Varsham, Santhosham Award
24. 2004 Sankardada MBBS, MAA T.V. Award
25. 2005 Suryam, Vamsi Berkley Award
26. 2006 Stalin, Santhosham Award
27. Best Story Writer in 1990 for Karthavyam, Kalasagar, Madras
28. Best Story Writer in 1993 for Aasayam, Cinegoers association, Hyderabad
29. Best Screenplay Writer in 1990 for Kodama Simham, Vamsi Berkley Awards

=== Best Film Directors ===
1. Third Best Film Director in 1987 for Prajaswamyam, A.P. State Nandi Award

=== Special Jury Award ===
1. Paruchuri Brothers were awarded with Special Jury Award for the year 2016, A.P. State Nandi Award

=== TV Awards ===
1. Best Playlet writer award in A.P. State Nandi Drama Competition for the playlet "Sambhavami Pade Pade" in 2009
2. Best Villain in comedy role for Sasirekha Parinayam movie in 2010, Gemini TV Film Awards
3. Best Social Program Presenter award received for "Prajavedika" in 2011, Padmamohana TV awards
4. Best Talk Show award for "Praja Vedika" in 2012, Gemini TV Awards
5. Best Anchor award for "Praja Vedika" in 2012, Yuvakala Vahini
6. Best Director award for Tele film "Sati Savitri" in 2014, Aradhana srikari ETV (Telecasted in 2013)
7. Second Best Tele Film "Sathi Savithri", Copper Nandi and Commendation certificate to the director award for 2013 given in 2017 by AP State Government.

=== Honors and Felicitations ===
1. Celebrate award in 2007 at "Telugu Chalana Chitra Vajrotsavam" (Diamond Jubilee)
2. "Sensational Star Writers of the Decade" Award by Super Hit Magazine in 2010
3. "Tv9 TSR Lalitha Kala Parishat" Best Story Dialogue Writers Award in 2010
4. "Vishala Bharati Gaurav Satkar" award by Delhi Telugu Academy in 2007 for Script Writing
5. "NTR Smaraka Purskara" Award for Contribution towards cinema in 2011, Hyderabad
6. For completion of 200 films with the title "200 Not Out" in 1992 at Ravindra Bharathi, Hyderabad
7. For completing "Silver Jubilee" in film writing successfully by "Singapore Telugu Association", Singapore in 2002
8. For completing 25 years in film writing successfully by "TANA (Telugu Association of North America)" at San Jose, USA in 2003
9. For completing 25 years in film writing successfully by "ETA (European Telugu Association)" at Birmingham, UK in 2003
10. Aatreya Award title by "Abhinandhana Cultural Association"
11. Visista Sodharulu title by "Padma Mohana" in 2004
12. Gangi Reddy Memorial International Spiritual Award, Vishakapatnam in 2009
13. "Viswa Vikhyata Rachana Sarwabhoumulu" title (Birudu) by "T. Subba Rami Reddy Lalitha Kala Parishath" on the occasion of completing 333 films in 33 years for 3 Generations in 2011
14. 100 years of SIFCC (South India Film Centenary Celebrations) film festival at Chennai in 2013
15. Dr. Allu Ramalingaiah National Award at Vijayawada in 2014
16. Dasari Smarakam Writer Award by Santotsham at 15th Santosham Film Awards in 2017
17. Life Time Achievement Award by Kakatiya Kala Sevasamithi, Hyderabad in 2017
18. TAAI Award In recognition of services to Telugu Language by Telugu Association of Australia, Melbourne in 2017
19. Life Time Achievement Award by Telugu Association Inc, Sydney in 2017
