= Dammit Katha Addam Thirigindi =

1987 Indian Telugu comedy film by K. Vasu

Damit Katha Adam Thirigindi
- Directed by: K. Vasu
- Written by: Paruchuri Brothers (story / dialogues)
- Screenplay by: K. Vasu
- Produced by: Jyothi Kumar; Annamreddy Krishna Kumar; Rajendra Prasad (Presents)
- Starring: Rajendra Prasad; Chandra Mohan; Naresh; Jeevitha Rajashekar
- Music by: Sivaji Raja
- Production company: Sri Kanaka Mahalakshmi Creations
- Release date: 11 September 1987
- Country: India
- Language: Telugu

Damit Katha Adam Thirigindi (transl. Damn it story has been reversed) is a 1987 Telugu-language comedy film, produced by Jyothi Kumar under the Sri Kanaka Mahalakshmi Creations banner, presented by Rajendra Prasad and directed by K. Vasu. It stars Rajendra Prasad, Chandra Mohan, Naresh, Jeevitha Rajashekar (in her major Telugu debut) and music composed by Sivaji Raja. The film's plot is based on Tamil film Bale Pandiya.

== Cast ==
- Rajendra Prasad as Gagapathi and Chakravarthy (dual role)
- Chandra Mohan as Chandram, Chalapathi and Parvathisam
- Naresh as Raja
- Jeevitha Rajashekar as Rani
- Prabha as Lalithamba
- Sudha as Vasanthi
- Suthi Veerabhadra Rao as Parvathisam's father-in-law
- KK Sarma as Constable Simhachalam

== Soundtrack ==
Dammit Katha Addam Thirigindi

Film score by Sivaji Raja
- Released: 1987
- Genre: Soundtrack
- Length: 17:06
- Label: AVM Audio
- Producer: Sivaji Raja

Music composed by Sivaji Raja. The music was released on AVM Audio Company.

List of Damit Katha Adam Thirigindi soundtrack music compositions
S. No.	Song Title	Lyrics	Singers	Length
1	"Koyila Kosindivela"	Veturi	S. P. Balasubrahmanyam, P. Susheela	4:24
2	"Evadura Monagadu"	Gopi	S. P. Balasubrahmanyam	4:05
3	"Tholivalape"	Gopi	S. P. Balasubrahmanyam, Vani Jayaram	4:19
4	"Sruthi Cheyi"	Jonnavithhula	Madhavpeddi Ramesh, P. Susheela, Vani Jayaram	4:18
