= Mundadugu =

- Theatrical release poster
- Directed by: K. Bapaiah
- Written by: Paruchuri Brothers
- Produced by: D. Rama Naidu
- Starring: Krishna; Shobhan Babu; Sridevi; Jaya Prada
- Cinematography: A. Venkat
- Edited by: K. A. Marthand
- Music by: K. Chakravarthy
- Production company: Suresh Productions
- Release date: 25 February 1983
- Country: India
- Language: Telugu

Mundadugu (transl. 'A step forward') is a 1983 Indian Telugu-language drama film directed by K. Bapaiah. Produced by D. Rama Naidu under the Suresh Productions banner. The film stars Krishna, Sobhan Babu, Sridevi, and Jaya Prada.

In 1984, it was remade in Hindi as Maqsad.

== Plot ==
Gummadi and Sivakrishna are brothers. Sivakrishna is a socialist and wants to dedicate the property to the poor, whereas Gummadi is a very selfish man. Their differences lead to the death of Sivakrishna as planned by Raogopal Rao, Allu and Chalapati Rao. Chakravarthi (Sobhan Babu) is the son of Gummadi and Tilak (Krishna) the son of Sivakrishna. Tilak joins Gummadi's company as a worker. Rani (Jaya Prada) is the niece of Gummadi and she falls in love with Tilak. Chakravarthi loves Bharti (Sridevi), daughter of a teacher in their company. The villains have issues with Tilak. The resulting conflict between Chakravarthi and Tilak finally leads to the revelation of their relationship and a happy ending.

== Cast ==
- Krishna as Balagangadhara Tilak
- Shobhan Babu as Chakravarthi
- Sridevi as Bharati
- Jaya Prada as Rani
- Kaikala Satyanarayana as Kamaraju
- Rao Gopal Rao as Phanibhushan Rao
- Allu Ramalingaiah as Bhujangam
- Sivakrishna as father of Balagangadhar Tilak
- Giribabu as Lingamurthy
- Chalapathi Rao as Nagendra
- Rajendra Prasad as Mohan
- Gummadi as Dharma Rao
- Nutan Prasad as Dasu
- Suryakantham as wife of Bhujangam
- Annapoorna as Sharada
- M. Prabhakar Reddy as Vishnumurthy
- Raavi Kondala Rao as Sarma
- Sakshi Ranga Rao
- Radha Kumari as mother of Rani
- Narra Venkateswara Rao as Inspector

== Soundtrack ==
All lyrics are written by Veturi; all music is composed by K. Chakravarthy.

No.	Title	Lyrics	Singer(s)	Length
1.	"Chilakaluripeta Kada Chilako"	Veturi	S. P. Balasubrahmanyam	4:30
2.	"Naakoka Srimathi Kavali"	Veturi	S. P. Balasubrahmanyam	4:31
3.	"Pora O Kantri Mama"	Veturi	S. P. Balasubramanyam, P.Susheela
4.	"Premaku Nenu Pedanu Kanu"	Veturi	P. Susheela
5.	"Veyi Padagala Meeda"	Veturi	S. P. Balasubrahmanyam	4:24
6.	"Ye Talli Kannado Ninnu"	Veturi	P.Susheela

== Box office ==
The film ran for more than 50 days in all the released centers. It also ran for more than 100 days and celebrated Silver Jubilee.
