= Sangharshana =

- Theatrical Poster
- Directed by: K. Murali Mohana Rao
- Written by: Paruchuri Brothers (Dialogues)
- Story by: V. C. Guhanathan
- Produced by: D. Ramanaidu
- Starring: Chiranjeevi; Vijayashanti; Nalini
- Music by: Chakravarthy
- Production company: Suresh Productions
- Distributed by: Suresh Productions
- Release date: 29 December 1983
- Country: India
- Language: Telugu

Sangharshana (transl. "Conflict") is a 1983 Indian Telugu-language action film directed by K. Murali Mohana Rao. The film stars Chiranjeevi, Vijayashanti and Nalini with Kaikala Satyanarayana, Rao Gopala Rao and Gummadi in other vital roles. It is the only Chiranjeevi film financed by D. Rama Naidu. Chakravarthy scored the film's soundtrack. The film was a Superhit at the box office.

== Plot ==
Dilip (Chiranjeevi) is educated in the United States and returns to India after a long time. His father Janardhan rao runs a factory and wants his son to take over his business. Meanwhile, Dilip meets Rekha and they both fall in love with each other. One day, Dilip realizes that his father is a smuggler, who runs his dark business under the mask of his factory. He senses the danger and refuses to take over his father's position and joins the same factory as a labour. He rises to union leader's position and revolts against his father.

== Cast ==
- Chiranjeevi as Dilip
- Vijayashanti as Radha
- Kaikala Satyanarayana as Sathyaraj
- Prabhakar Reddy as Dilip's father
- Gummadi as Krishnamurthy
- Rao Gopala Rao as Site Manager
- Allu Ramalingaiah as Varahamurthy
- Nalini as Rekha
- Sivakrishna as Shivam
- Annapurna
- Nirmalamma
