= D. Ramanaidu =

Indian film producer (1936–2015)

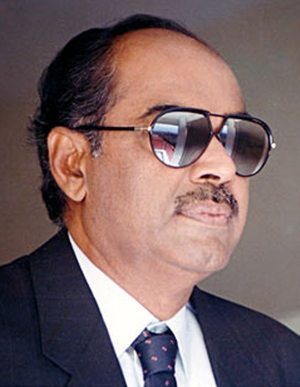
- Born: Daggubati Ramanaidu; 6 June 1936; Karamchedu, Madras Presidency, British India (now in Andhra Pradesh, India)
- Died: 18 February 2015 (aged 78); Hyderabad, Telangana, India
- Occupations: Film producer; politician
- Political party: Telugu Desam Party
- Spouse: Rajeshwari
- Children: 3 including D. Suresh Babu, Venkatesh
- Relatives: See Daggubati–Akkineni family
- Awards: Padma Bhushan (2012); Dadasaheb Phalke Award (2009)

Member of Parliament, Lok Sabha
- In office 6 October 1999 – 16 May 2004
- Preceded by: N. Janardhana Reddy
- Succeeded by: Daggubati Purandeswari
- Constituency: Bapatla

Daggubati Ramanaidu (6 June 1936 – 18 February 2015) was an Indian film producer known for his work in Telugu cinema. He founded Suresh Productions in 1964 which became of one of the largest film production companies in India. He was one of the most influential movie moguls in Indian cinema. He was placed in the Guinness Book of World Records for the most films produced by an individual, with more than 150 films in all official Indian languages. He also served as a Member of Parliament for the Bapatla constituency in Andhra Pradesh in the 13th Lok Sabha from 1999 to 2004.

In 2012, Ramanaidu was conferred with the third-highest civilian award of India, the Padma Bhushan, in recognition for his contribution to Indian cinema. In 2009, he was conferred with the Dada Saheb Phalke Award, the highest award for films in Indian cinema. He has also received the Raghupathi Venkaiah Award, and the Filmfare Lifetime Achievement Award – South for his work in Telugu cinema. Ramanaidu contributed a substantial part of his earnings to numerous philanthropic purposes under the "Ramanaidu Charitable Trust" that was founded in 1991.

== Early life ==
Daggubati Ramanaidu was born on 6 June 1936 in a Telugu Kamma family in Karamchedu, a village in Prakasam district in the present day Andhra Pradesh. He completed his schooling in the village and had his college education in Chirala and later graduated from Presidency College, Chennai.

He started his career as a rice-mill owner and later got into the transport business. During this time, his father joined with a relative and co-produced the Telugu film Nammina Bantu (1958), starring Akkineni Nageswara Rao and Savitri. He performed the dupe of Nageswara Rao in the film. Nageswara Rao advised him to go to Madras (now Chennai) and work with film-makers. He closed down his rice mill as he was not happy with it, and moved to Madras in 1962. He intended to start a brick business, but later switched to real estate. His frequent visits to the "Andhra Club" got him acquainted with the Telugu film fraternities.

== Film career ==
In 1963, Ramanaidu partnered with his friends Tagirisa Hanumantha Rao, Yarlagadda Lakshmaiah Chowdary and co-produced the commercially unsuccessful Anuragam (1963). Following that, he established his own production house Suresh Productions, and produced Ramudu Bheemudu (1964). Until the early 1970s, he kept to Telugu cinema and made films such as Pratigna Palana (1965), Sri Krishna Tulabharam (1966), Shree Janma (1967), Paapa Kosam (1968) and Sepoy Chinnaiah (1969). Ramudu Bheemudu remained his only box office success during this period. While in Madras, he partnered with B. Nagi Reddy's sons and formed a company called "Vijaya Suresh Combines" and made some films under that house.

In 1971, he produced Prem Nagar, starring Akkineni Nageswara Rao and Vanisri. The film went on to become a "blockbuster" and its success prompted Tamil and Hindi remakes entitled Vasantha Maligai (1972) and Prem Nagar (1974), respectively. Both versions were produced by him and became equally successful. Namma Kuzhaindagal, Tirumangalyam, Madhurageetham, Kuzhanthaikkaga and Deivapiravi are some of his Tamil productions that were made during the 1970s and 80s.

As all the studios were based in Madras at that date, he started "Ramanaidu Studios" in Hyderabad with the help of the state government in 1983. While frequently making films in Telugu and Tamil, he branched out into the Kannada, Hindi, Malayalam, Marathi, Bengali, Oriya film, Gujarati, Bhojpuri, Assamese and Punjabi industries. His Hindi films include Dildaar, Tohfa, Anari, Hum Aapke Dil Mein Rehte Hain and Aaghaaz.

As of 2015, he had made more than 130 films in 13 Indian languages. The feat earned him a place in the Guinness Book of World Records in 2008. Ramanaidu also acted in a few films, mostly his own productions. He played a full-length role for the first time in the 2007 Telugu film Hope. The film, which dealt with teenage suicides arising out of educational stress among students, won the award for Best Film on Other Social Issues at the 54th National Film Awards.

== Family and personal life ==
Ramanaidu got married in 1958 and had three children, two sons and a daughter. His elder son D. Suresh Babu is a producer and his younger son Venkatesh is an actor in Telugu cinema. He had eight grandchildren, two of whom – Rana and Naga Chaitanya – are actors in Telugu cinema.

Ramanaidu was a member of the Telugu Desam Party and represented Baptala constituency of Guntur district in the 13th Lok Sabha from 1999 to 2004. He lost the 2004 election for the same seat in the 14th Lok Sabha.

== Awards and honors ==
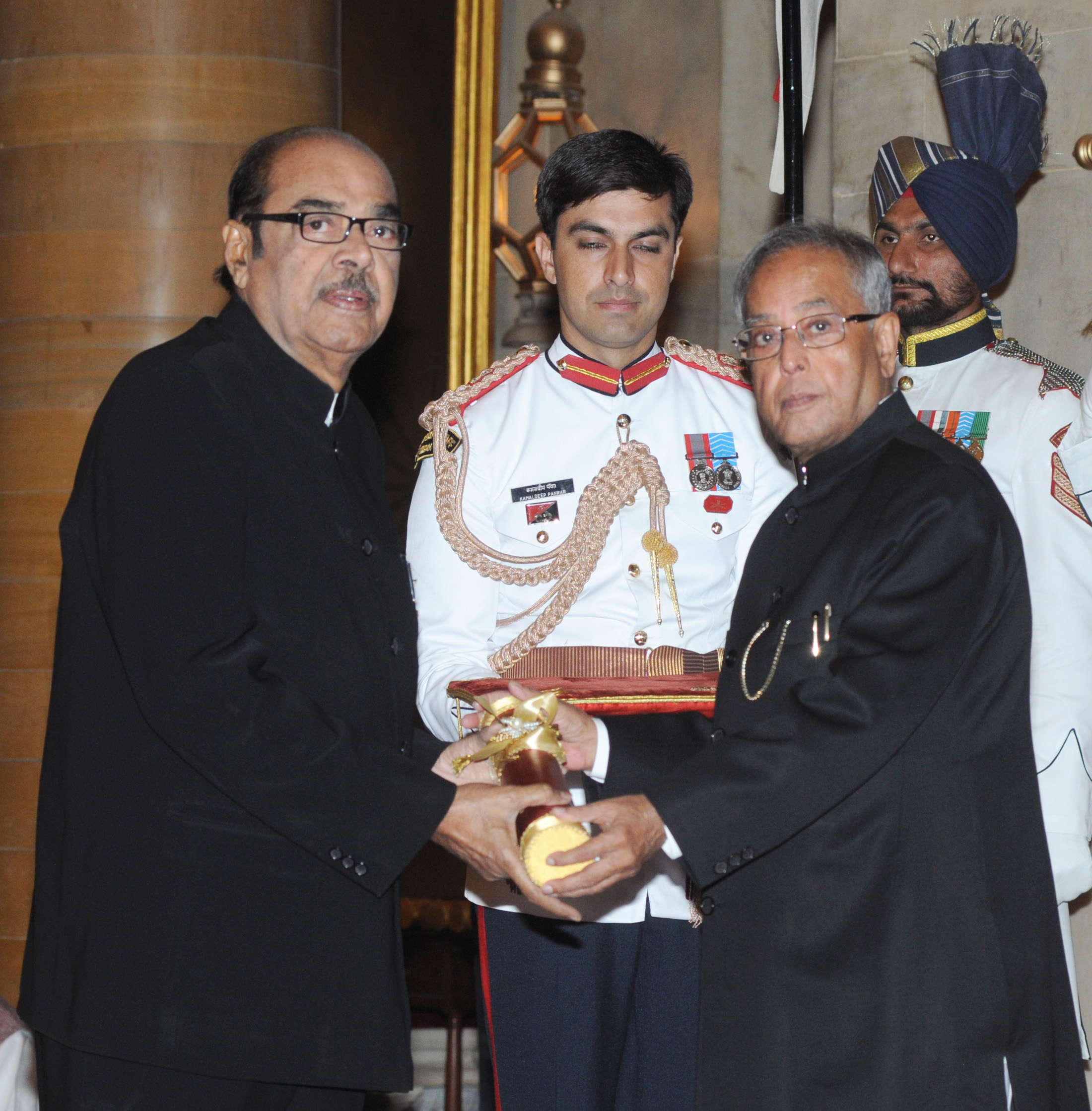
President Pranab Mukherjee presenting the Padma Bhushan Award to Ramanaidu, at an Investiture Ceremony, at Rashtrapati Bhavan, in New Delhi on 5 April 2013

Civilian Honors

- Padma Bhushan - 2012

National Film Awards

- National Film Award for Best Feature Film in Bengali – Asukh (1999)
- National Film Award for Best Film on Other Social Issues - Hope (2006)
- Dadasaheb Phalke Award - 2009

Nandi Awards

- Nandi Award for Best Feature Film - Andhra Vaibhavam
- Nandi Award for Best Feature Film - Preminchu (2001)
- Raghupathi Venkaiah Award - 2006

Tamil Nadu State Film Awards

- Tamil Nadu State Film Award for Best Film (Third prize) – Namma Kuzhanthaigal (1970)
- Tamil Nadu State Film Award for Best Film (Second prize) – Madhurageetham (1977)

Filmfare Awards South

- Filmfare Award for Best Telugu Film – Jeevana Tarangalu (1973)
- Filmfare Award for Best Telugu Film – Soggadu (1976)
- Filmfare Lifetime Achievement Award – South (2000)

Other Honors

- Honorary doctorate from Sri Venkateswara University, Tirupati

== Death ==
In January 2014, it was reported that Ramanaidu had been diagnosed with prostate cancer. He died on 18 February 2015, at the age of 78, in Hyderabad, Telangana. All of the big Telugu contemporaries like Chiranjeevi, Balakrishna, Nagarjuna, Rajasekhar, Ravi Teja, K. Raghavendra Rao, Mahesh Babu, Pawan Kalyan, Ram Charan, Allu Arjun, and NTR Jr. paid their last respects to him.

== Partial filmography ==
=== Telugu ===
- Ramudu Bheemudu
- Pratiganapalana
- Prema Nagar
- Jeevana Tarangalu
- Chakravakam
- Soggadu
- Agni Poolu
- Devata
- Mundadugu
- Sangharshana
- Kathanayakudu
- Kaliyuga Pandavulu
- Ramu
- Aha Naa Pellanta
- Chinababu
- Brahma Puthrudu
- Prema
- Indrudu Chandrudu
- Bobbili Raja
- Coolie No. 1
- Super Police
- Dharma Chakram
- Oho Naa Pellanta
- Preminchukundam Raa
- Ganesh
- Preyasi Rave
- Kalisundam Raa
- Jayam Manadera
- Preminchu
- Nee Premakai
- Nuvvu Leka Nenu Lenu
- Hari Villu
- Vijayam
- Neeku Nenu Naaku Nuvvu
- Malliswari
- Soggadu
- Nireekshana
- Sri Krishna 2006
- Hope
- Madhumasam
- Tulasi
- Kousalya Supraja Rama
- Baladoor
- Bendu Apparao R.M.P
- Aalasyam Amrutam
- Mugguru
- Masala
- Nenem…Chinna Pillana?
- Bhimavaram Bullodu
- Drushyam
- Gopala Gopala

=== Tamil ===
- Vasantha Maligai
- Thanikattu Raja
- Kuzhanthaikkaga
- Deivapiravi

=== Hindi ===
- Prem Nagar
- Dildaar
- Bandish
- Tohfa
- Maqsad
- Insaaf Ki Awaaz
- Dilwaala
- Anari
- Hum Aapke Dil Mein Rehte Hain
