= Kaliyuga Pandavulu =

- Poster
- Directed by: K. Raghavendra Rao
- Screenplay by: K. Raghavendra Rao
- Story by: Paruchuri brothers
- Produced by: D. Ramanaidu
- Starring: Venkatesh; Khushbu
- Cinematography: K. S. Prakash Rao
- Edited by: K. A. Marthand
- Music by: Chakravarthy
- Production company: Suresh Productions
- Release date: 14 August 1986
- Running time: 151 minutes
- Country: India
- Language: Telugu

Kaliyuga Pandavulu (transl. Pandavas of Kaliyuga) is a 1986 Indian Telugu-language masala film produced by D. Ramanaidu under Suresh Productions, and directed by K. Raghavendra Rao. It stars Ramanaidu's son Venkatesh and Khushbu (making their cinematic debut), with music composed by Chakravarthy. The film was a box office hit, and was remade in Kannada in 1989 as Poli Huduga. Venkatesh won the Nandi Special Jury Award for his Debut acting.

== Plot ==
Vijay, son of Chakrapani, a multimillionaire, has a lot of arrogance and pride, he plays a lot of mischief in college with his three friends. Bharathi, a middle-class girl studies in the same college. Even though Vijay teases Bharathi many times, even then she protects his life once, which changes his entire lifestyle and he falls in love with her. He wants to marry Bharathi, but his father doesn't agree, he traps Bharathi and proves her as a prostitute in the court with the help of a gang: MLA Eekambaram, Dr. Vaayunandan Rao, S. I. Aagreya Murthy, Lawyer Jalandhar, Bhudevi along with Bharathi's brother-in-law Bhairava Murthy who wants to marry her, on that reason Bharathi's father Jaganatham commits suicide and Bharathi goes away. Vijay quarrels with his father, leaves the house, and searches for Bharathi, he learns that Bharathi is with her elder sister Krishnaveni and they are under the protection of Retired Army Officer Bhishmanarayan and he also discovers that Krishnaveni is also cheated by Dr. Vaayunandan Rao and sent to jail by MLA Eekambaram and gang only.

Bhishmanarayan inspires Vijay, with his inspiration Vijay and his three friends, along with Bharathi form a revolutionary team in the name of Kaliyuga Pandavulu and fight against all anti-social elements and illegal activities in the society. Finally, Vijay catches all the real criminals and presents them in an open court, Chakrapani also realizes and admits his mistake. Vijay proves that Bharathi is innocent and they all continue their mission Kaliyuga Pandavulu.

== Cast ==
- Venkatesh as Vijay
- Khushbu as Bharathi (Voice Dubbed by Roja Ramani)
- Surya as Bhatha
- Chitti Babu as Bhaskar
- Saritha as Krishnaveni
- Aswini as Meku
- Rao Gopal Rao as Chakrapani
- Nutan Prasad as MLA Eekambaram
- Ranganath as Bhishmanarayan
- Rallapalli as Chakrapani's brother-in-law
- Shakti Kapoor as Karamchand
- Radha Ravi as Bhairava Murthy
- Rajeev as Dr.Vaayunandan Rao
- Narra Venkateswara Rao as Lawyer Jalandhar
- Chalapathi Rao as S. I. Aagreya Murthy
- J. V. Somayajulu as Judge
- P. J. Sarma as I.G.
- P. L. Narayana as Jaganatham
- Mikkilineni as D.I.G.
- K.K.Sarma as Compounder Narayana
- Chidatala Appa Rao as Hotel Manager
- Mada Venkateswara Rao
- Jayanthi as Rajeswari
- Rama Prabha as Chakrapani's sister
- Kalpana Rai
- Y. Vijaya as Bhudevi

== Soundtrack ==
Music composed by Chakravarthy. Lyrics written by Veturi.

S.No	Song title	Singers	length
1	"Oka Papaku"	S. P. Balasubrahmanyam, P. Susheela	3:59
2	"Ha Ha Ha Agava"	S. P. Balasubrahmanyam, S. Janaki	4:07
3	"Nenu Puttina Roju"	S. P. Balasubrahmanyam, S. Janaki	4:01
4	"Endhuko Ollu"	S. P. Balasubrahmanyam, S. Janaki	4:04
5	"Buggaa Buggaa Cheppaali"	S. P. Balasubrahmanyam, S. Janaki	3:19
6	"Ee Kourava Ee Dhanava"	S. P. Balasubrahmanyam, S. Janaki	3:59
