= Samantha Ruth Prabhu filmography =

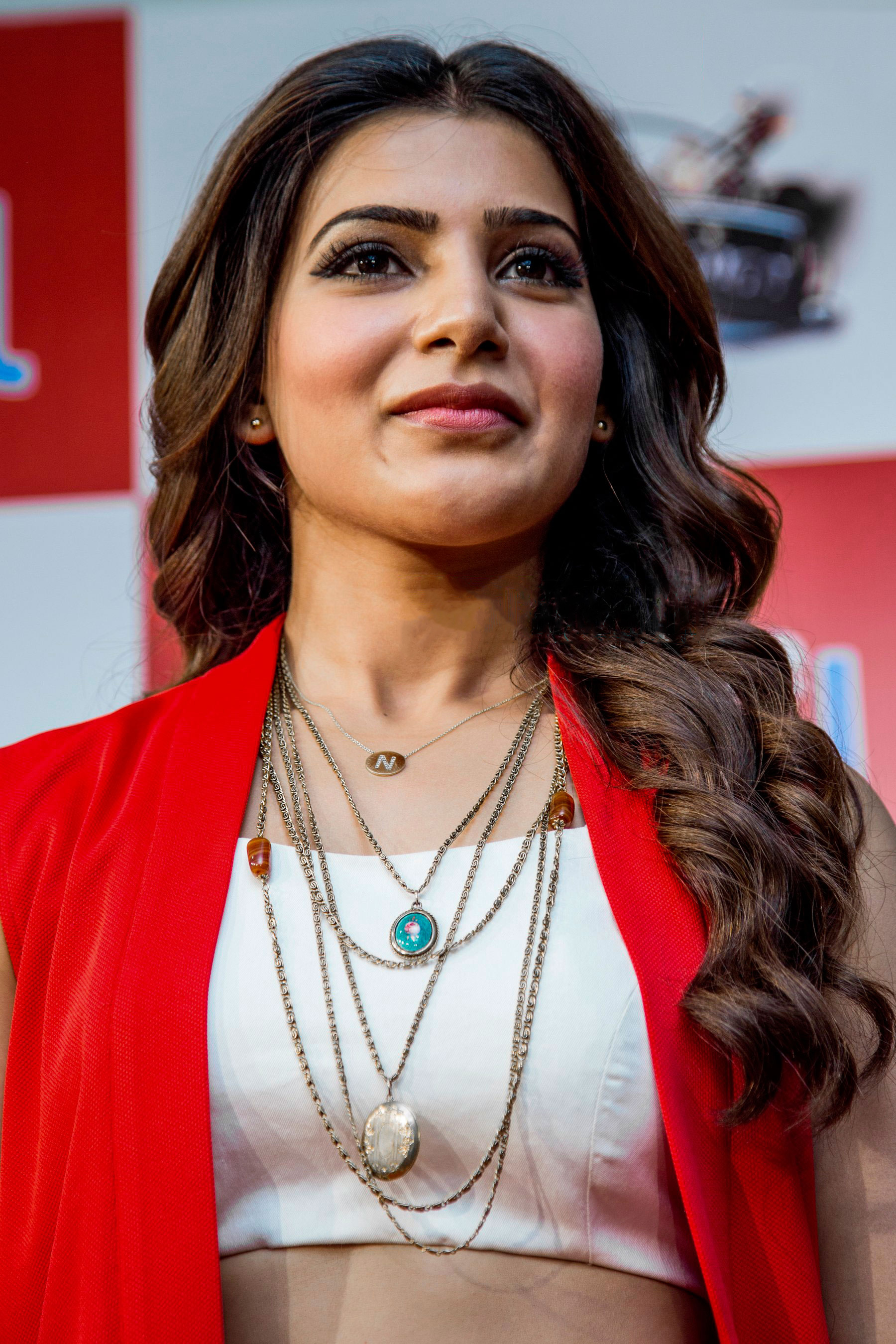
- Samantha in 2015
- Film: 50
- Web series: 2
- Television show: 3
- Music videos: 1

Samantha Ruth Prabhu is an Indian actress who works predominantly in Telugu and Tamil films. One of the highest paid and popular actresses of South India, she made her acting debut in 2010 as a small role in Gautham Vasudev Menon's Tamil romance film Vinnaithaandi Varuvaayaa, which was simultaneously made in Telugu as Ye Maaya Chesave in which she played a Lead Role . (Note: Samantha appeared in a role in Ye Maaya Chesave's simultaneously-filmed Tamil version Vinnaithaandi Varuvaayaa.) The former film earned her the Filmfare Award for Best Female Debut – South and a Nandi Award. In 2012, Samantha featured in live action Telugu-Tamil bilingual project Eega (Naan Ee). The film received positive reviews in both Telugu and Tamil languages and it was one of the highest-grossing Telugu films of the year, earning ₹1.15 billion globally. Her performance as a micro artist who runs a NGO and takes revenge for the murder of her lover earned her the Filmfare Award for Best Telugu Actress. In the same year, she appeared in the trilingual romantic drama Neethaane En Ponvasantham (2012). The film earned her praise from critics, and Samantha won her first Filmfare Award for Best Tamil Actress. 2012 became her most prolific award-winning year and she secured further recognition for Best Actress at the Vijay Awards, Santosham Film Awards and the CineMAA Awards. Popular playback singer and dubbing artist Chinmayi Sripada has been the voice of Samantha in most of her Telugu language films right from her debut in Ye Maaya Chesave. She has also dubbed for Samantha in a few of her Tamil and Hindi language films.

Between 2013 and 2015, Samantha mostly appeared in leading female roles in hero-centric Tamil as well as Telugu films, such as the Tamil-language action-drama Anjaan (2014), social action Kaththi (2014), and action-drama 10 Endrathukulla (2014). This film, along with Theri, and 24 (both 2016), and Mersal (2017) earned her nominations for the Filmfare Award for Best Tamil Actress. Other film appearances include the comedy family drama Seethamma Vakitlo Sirimalle Chettu (2013), action drama Attarintiki Daredi (2013), fantasy-drama Manam (2014), and action comedy Rabhasa (2014). Her work in the Telugu film A Aa (2016) won her a fourth Filmfare Award. Samantha starred in the second season of the Amazon Prime Video series The Family Man in 2021.

== Films ==
Key
| † | Denotes films that have not yet been released |

Samantha Ruth Prabhu's film credits
| Year | Title | Role(s) | Language(s) | Notes | Ref. |
|---|---|---|---|---|---|
| 2010 | Vinnaithaandi Varuvaayaa | Nandini | Tamil | Debut | |
| 2010 | Ye Maaya Chesave | Jessie Thekekuthu | Telugu | Debut as Lead | |
| 2010 | Baana Kaathadi | Priya | Tamil | | |
| 2010 | Moscowin Kavery | Kaveri Thangavelu | Tamil | | |
| 2010 | Brindavanam | Indu | Telugu | | |
| 2011 | Dookudu | Prashanthi | Telugu | | |
| 2011 | Nadunisi Naaygal | Asylum patient | Tamil | Cameo appearance | |
| 2012 | Ekk Deewana Tha | Samantha | Hindi | Cameo appearance | |
| 2012 | Eega | Bindu | Telugu | Bilingual film | |
| 2012 | Naan Ee | Bindu | Tamil | Bilingual film | |
| 2012 | Neethaane En Ponvasantham | Nithya Vasudevan | Tamil | | |
| 2012 | Yeto Vellipoyindhi Manasu | Nithya Yelavarthi | Telugu | | |
| 2013 | Seethamma Vakitlo Sirimalle Chettu | Geetha | Telugu | | |
| 2013 | Jabardasth | Shreya | Telugu | | |
| 2013 | Theeya Velai Seiyyanum Kumaru | Herself | Tamil | Cameo | |
| 2013 | Attarintiki Daredi | Sashi | Telugu | | |
| 2013 | Ramayya Vasthavayya | Akarsha | Telugu | | |
| 2014 | Manam | Krishnaveni and Priya (Note: Samantha played two characters.) | Telugu | | |
| 2014 | Autonagar Surya | Sirisha | Telugu | | |
| 2014 | Alludu Seenu | Anjali | Telugu | | |
| 2014 | Rabhasa | Indu | Telugu | | |
| 2014 | Anjaan | Jeeva | Tamil | | |
| 2014 | Kaththi | Ankitha | Tamil | | |
| 2015 | S/O Satyamurthy | Sameera / Subbalakshmi | Telugu | | |
| 2015 | 10 Endrathukulla | Shakila and Gadgi Moi | Tamil | | |
| 2015 | Thanga Magan | Yamuna Thamizh | Tamil | | |
| 2016 | Bangalore Naatkal | Grace Francis | Tamil | Cameo | |
| 2016 | Theri | Mithra Vijaykumar | Tamil | | |
| 2016 | 24 | Sathyabhama "Sathya" | Tamil | | |
| 2016 | Brahmotsavam | Brahma | Telugu | | |
| 2016 | A Aa | Anasuya Ramalingam | Telugu | | |
| 2016 | Janatha Garage | Bujji | Telugu | | |
| 2017 | Raju Gari Gadhi 2 | Amrutha | Telugu | | |
| 2017 | Mersal | Tara | Tamil | | |
| 2018 | Rangasthalam | Rama Lakshmi | Telugu | | |
| 2018 | Mahanati | Madhuravani | Telugu | | |
| 2018 | Irumbu Thirai | Dr. Rathi Devi | Tamil | | |
| 2018 | Seemaraja | Sudhanthira Selvi (Silambu Selvi) | Tamil | | |
| 2018 | U Turn | Rachana | Tamil; Telugu | Bilingual film | |
| 2019 | Super Deluxe | Vaembu | Tamil | | |
| 2019 | Majili | Sravani | Telugu | | |
| 2019 | Oh! Baby | Savithri / B. Swathi "Baby" | Telugu | | |
| 2019 | Manmadhudu 2 | Architecture student | Telugu | Cameo | |
| 2020 | Jaanu | Janaki Devi "Jaanu" | Telugu | | |
| 2021 | Pushpa: The Rise | Dancer | Telugu | Special appearance in the song "Oo Antava Oo Oo Antava" | |
| 2022 | Kaathuvaakula Rendu Kaadhal | Khatija Begum | Tamil | | |
| 2022 | Yashoda | Yashoda | Telugu | | |
| 2023 | Shaakuntalam | Shakuntala | Telugu | | |
| 2023 | Kushi | Aradhya Rao | Telugu | | |
| 2025 | Subham | Maya Matasri | Telugu | Cameo appearance; Also producer | |
| 2026 | Maa Inti Bangaaram | Swarna / Jhansi | Telugu | Also producer | |

== Television ==
Key
| † | Denotes television productions that have not yet been released |

List of Samantha Ruth Prabhu television credits
| Year | Title | Role | Platform | Language | Notes | Ref. |
|---|---|---|---|---|---|---|
| 2020 | Bigg Boss Season 4 | Host | Star Maa | Telugu | Dusshera special episode | |
| 2020–2021 | Sam Jam | Host | Aha | Telugu | Talk show | |
| 2021 | The Family Man: Season 2 | Rajalekshmi "Raji" Sekharan | Amazon Prime Video | Hindi | Season 2 | |
| 2024 | Citadel: Honey Bunny | Hanimandakini "Honey" Raj | Amazon Prime Video | Hindi | | |
| 2026– present | Celebrity MasterChef Tamil | Host | Sony Vizha | Tamil | | |
| TBA | Rakt Brahmand: The Bloody Kingdom † | TBA | Netflix | Hindi | Filming | |

== Music videos ==
List of Samantha Ruth Prabhu music video credits
| Year | Title | Composer | Language | Ref. |
|---|---|---|---|---|
| 2010 | "Semmozhiyaana Thamizh Mozhiyaam" | A. R. Rahman | Tamil | |

== See also ==
- List of awards and nominations received by Samantha Ruth Prabhu
