= List of awards and nominations received by Samantha Ruth Prabhu =

Samantha Ruth Prabhu awards and nominations
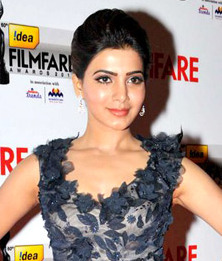
- Samantha at 60th Filmfare Awards South, 2013
Awards and nominations
Award	Wins	Nominations
CineMAA Awards	3	3
TSR-TV9 National Film Awards	2	3
Vikatan Awards	1	2
Filmfare Awards South	4	15
Nandi Awards	2	2
Santosham Film Awards	3	3
South Indian International Movie Awards	6	14
IIFA Utsavam	1	2
Vijay Awards	1	4
Zee Cine Awards Telugu	2	2
Zee Cine Awards Tamil	1	3
Critics' Choice Film Awards	1	2
New York Cinematography Awards	1	1
Indian Film Festival of Melbourne Awards	1	1
Promax Awards	1	1
Filmfare OTT Awards	1	1
Tamil Nadu State Film Awards	1	1
Other Awards	8	8

Totals (Note: Certain award groups do not simply award one winner. They acknowledge several different recipients, have runners-up, and have third place. Since this is a specific recognition and is different from losing an award, runner-up mentions are considered wins in this award tally. For simplification and to avoid errors, each award in this list has been presumed to have had a prior nomination.)
- Wins: 40
- Nominations: 68

Samantha Ruth Prabhu is an Indian actress who primarily works in the South Indian film industry, where she has established herself as a leading actress. She is recipient several awards, including four Filmfare Awards, a Filmfare OTT Award, two Nandi Awards, a Vijay Award, six South Indian International Movie Awards, and three CineMAA Awards.

Samantha made her acting debut in 2010 with a leading role in the Telugu film Ye Maaya Chesave, for which she won the Filmfare Award for Best Female Debut – South and a Nandi Special Jury Award, in addition to her first Filmfare Award for Best Actress – Telugu nomination. Samantha subsequently earned wide recognition with her role as a NIFT student in the romantic drama, Baana Kaathadi (2010). She then went on to feature in big-budget Telugu-language action comedy film, Dookudu (2012) opposite Mahesh Babu. The film's success made Samantha one of the most sought heroines in Telugu cinema. For her performance as the love interest of a police officer in the film, she received her second nomination for the Filmfare Award for Best Actress – Telugu. She also subsequently made guest appearances in the psychological thriller film, Nadunisi Naaygal (2011) and Ekk Deewana Tha (2012). Samantha next featured in S. S. Rajamouli's live-action Telugu-Tamil bilingual project Eega (2012), portraying a micro artist who runs an NGO and takes revenge for the murder of her lover. The film became a major commercial success earning her the Filmfare Award for Best Actress – Telugu. She also won Best Actress awards at other ceremonies, including CineMAA Awards, Santosham Film Awards and SIIMA Awards. Samantha played the leading female role of Nithya in the trilingual romantic drama film Neethane En Ponvasantham (2012), for which she won Best Actress at the Vijay Awards and the Ananda Vikatan Awards, in addition to a nomination in the same category at the SIIMA Awards.

In 2013, Samantha starred in the comedy-drama film, Attarintiki Daredi, which emerged as the highest-grossing Telugu film upon release. Her performance saw her win Best Actress awards at the SIIMA Awards and the Santosham Film Awards. Portraying Anasuya Ramalingam, a naive girl trying to escape from the controlling behavior of her mother, her performance in the romantic comedy, A Aa, fetched her second Filmfare Award for Best Actress – Telugu, in addition to Best Actress awards at the IIFA Utsavam Awards, the Santosham Film Awards, and a nomination in the same category at the SIIMA Awards.

In 2021, for her performance in the Amazon Prime Video web series, The Family Man (Season 2), Samantha won widespread critical acclaim and accolades, including the Filmfare OTT Award for Best Actress in a Drama Series and the Indian Film Festival of Melbourne Award for Best Performance (Female) in a Web Series.

== State Honours ==
=== Champions of Change ===
Champions of Change is an Indian National Award for promoting Gandhian values like Community Service, Social Development, Healthcare, Education, and National Unity, selected by constitutional jury members headed by K. G. Balakrishnan Former Chief Justice of India and Former Chairman NHRC. It is given annually in four categories and usually presented by the President, Vice president, Prime Minister of India or a leading figure. These awards are sponsored by the Government of India and are also conducted at the state level.

Year	Honour	Category	Ref.
2022	Champions of Change Telangana - 2021 for her work in the area of social welfare through Pratyusha Support	Outstanding Contribution to the Development and Welfare of Women and Children	

== Ananda Vikatan Awards ==
Ananda Vikatan Cinema Awards is an annual awards ceremony for people in the Tamil film industry.

Samantha has received one award from two nominations.

Year	Work	Category	Result	Ref.
2013	Neethaane En Ponvasantham	Best Actress	Won	
2019	Super Deluxe	Best Actress	Nominated	

== CineMAA Awards ==
Introduced in 2004, the CineMAA Awards are presented annually by the Maa TV Group to honor the artistic and technical excellence of professionals in the Telugu Cinema.

Samantha has won three awards.

Year	Work	Category	Result	Ref.
2011	Ye Maaya Chesave	Best Female Debut	Won	
2013	Eega	Best Actress	Won	
2015	Manam	Best Actress	Won	

== Filmfare Awards South ==
Filmfare Awards South is the South Indian segment of the annual Filmfare Awards, presented by the Filmfare magazine of The Times Group to honor both artistic and technical excellence of professionals in the South Indian film industry encompassing four languages, namely, Telugu, Tamil, Malayalam, and Kannada.

Samantha has won four awards from thirteen nominations which includes a rare double award in two languages in the same year, and only Jayalalitha and Revathi have previously accomplished.

Year	Work	Category	Language	Result	Ref.
2011	Ye Maaya Chesave	Best Female Debut	Telugu	Won	
2011	Ye Maaya Chesave	Best Actress	Telugu	Nominated	
2012	Dookudu	Best Actress	Telugu	Nominated	
2013	Eega	Best Actress	Telugu	Won	
2013	Neethaane En Ponvasantham	Best Actress	Tamil	Won	
2014	Attarintiki Daredi	Best Actress	Telugu	Nominated	
2015	Manam	Best Actress	Telugu	Nominated	
2015	Kaththi	Best Actress	Tamil	Nominated	
2017	A Aa	Best Actress	Telugu	Won	
2017	Theri	Best Actress	Tamil	Nominated	
2017	24	Best Actress	Tamil	Nominated	
2019	Rangasthalam	Best Actress	Telugu	Nominated	
2019	Mahanati	Best Supporting Actress	Telugu	Nominated	
2023	Yashoda	Best Actress	Telugu	Nominated	
2024	Shaakuntalam	Best Actress	Telugu	Nominated	

== IIFA Utsavam ==
The IIFA Utsavam is an annual international event organized by the Wizcraft International Entertainment Pvt. Ltd. to honour the artistic and technical achievements of the South Indian film industry.

Samantha has received one award.

Year	Work	Category	Result	Ref.
2017	A Aa	Best Actress	Won	
2017	Theri	Best Actress	Nominated	
2024	All movies	Woman of the Year in Indian Cinema	Won	

== Nandi Awards ==
Presented annually by the Government of Andhra Pradesh, the Nandi Awards are the awards that recognize the excellence in Telugu cinema, Telugu theatre, and Telugu television, and Lifetime achievements in Indian cinema.

The Nandi awards for 2012 and 2013 could not be finalized because of the extremely volatile situation in the undivided state in light of the political uncertainty caused by the Telangana statehood movement. Therefore, the recipients were awarded in 2017.

Samantha has won two awards.

Year	Work	Category	Result	Ref.
2011	Ye Maaya Chesave	Special Jury Award	Won	
2012	Yeto Vellipoyindhi Manasu	Best Actress	Won	

== Tamil Nadu State Film Awards ==
Tamil Nadu State Film Awards were given for excellence in Tamil cinema in India. They were given annually to honour the best talents and provide encouragement and incentive to the South Indian film industry by the Government of Tamil Nadu. The awards were first given in 1967 and discontinued after 1970. The awards were given again in 1977 and continued till 1982. Since 1988, the awards were regularly given until it became defunct in 2008. The awards were reinstated in July 2017 after the government announced the wins for 2009–2014.

Year	Work	Category	Result	Ref.
2013	Neethaane En Ponvasantham	Special Prize	Won	

== Santosham Film Awards ==
Samantha won three awards from three nominations.

Year	Work	Category	Result	Ref.
2013	Eega	Best Actress	Won	
2014	Attarintiki Daredi	Best Actress	Won	
2017	A Aa	Best Actress	Won	

== South Indian International Movie Awards ==
The SIIMA awards for the years 2019 and 2020 were awarded in 2021, as the award ceremonies were canceled due to COVID-19 pandemic in India.

Samantha has won six awards from fourteen nominations.

Year	Work	Category	Language	Result	Ref.
2012	Dookudu	Best Actress – Telugu	Telugu	Nominated	
2013	Neethaane En Ponvasantham	Best Actress – Tamil	Tamil	Nominated	
2013	Eega	Best Actress – Telugu	Telugu	Nominated	
2014	Attarintiki Daredi	Best Actress – Telugu	Telugu	Won	
2015	Manam	Best Actress – Telugu	Telugu	Nominated	
2015	Manam	Critics Best Actress – Telugu	Telugu	Won	
2015	Kaththi	Best Actress – Tamil	Tamil	Nominated	
2016	S/O Satyamurthy	Best Actress – Telugu	Telugu	Nominated	
2016	—	Youth Icon of South India	—	Won	
2017	A Aa	Best Actress – Telugu	Telugu	Nominated	
2017	Theri	Best Actress – Tamil	Tamil	Nominated	
2019	Rangasthalam	Best Actress – Telugu	Telugu	Nominated	
2019	Rangasthalam	Critics Best Actress – Telugu	Telugu	Won	
2019	Irumbu Thirai	Best Actress – Tamil	Tamil	Nominated	
2019	—	Style Icon of the Year (Female)	—	Won	
2021	Oh! Baby	Best Actress – Telugu	Telugu	Won	
2023	Yashoda	Best Actress – Telugu	Telugu	Nominated	

- Samantha won the Best Actress award for Oh! Baby in 2021 although the film released in 2019.

== TSR-TV9 National Film Awards ==
Samantha has won one award from three nominations and one Citation of Honour in recognition to her outstanding and exemplary contribution to the world of film and entertainment.

Year	Work	Category	Result	Ref.
2011	Ye Maaya Chesave	Best Actress	Nominated	
2012	Eega	Best Actress	Won	
2015	Attarintiki Daredi	Best Actress	Won	
2019	—	Citation of Honour	Won	

== Vijay Awards ==
The Vijay Awards are presented by the Tamil television channel STAR Vijay to honor excellence in Tamil cinema.

Samantha has won an award from four nominations.

Year	Work	Category	Result	Ref.
2011	Baana Kaathadi	Best Debut Actress	Nominated	
2013	Neethaane En Ponvasantham	Best Actress	Won	
2013	Neethaane En Ponvasantham	Favourite Heroine	Nominated	
2017	Mersal	Favourite Heroine	Nominated	

== Zee Cine Awards Tamil ==
The Zee Cine Awards are an annual award ceremony organized by the Zee Entertainment Enterprises to honor excellence in Tamil cinema.

Samantha has won one award.

Year	Work	Category	Result	Ref.
2020	Super Deluxe	Special Mention	Won	
2020	Super Deluxe	Best Actress	Nominated	
2020	Super Deluxe	Favourite Heroine	Nominated	

== Zee Cine Awards Telugu ==
The Zee Cine Awards Telugu (ZCAT) is an annual award ceremony organized by the Zee Entertainment Enterprises to honor excellence in Telugu cinema and Telugu Music.

Samantha has won two awards.

Year	Work	Category	Result	Ref.
2017	–	Queen of Box Office	Won	
2020	Oh! Baby and Majili	Best Actor in a Leading Role – Female	Won	
2020	Oh! Baby and Majili	Favourite Heroine	Nominated	

== Indian Film Festival of Melbourne Awards ==
The Indian Film Festival of Melbourne (IFFM) was founded in 2012. It is a State Government of Victoria funded annual festival based in Melbourne. It is presented by Film Victoria, and the provider is chosen through a tender process.

This marked Samantha's first nomination in the OTT arena, for which she won the award.

Year	Work	Category	Result	Ref.
2021	The Family Man (Season 2)	Best Performance (Female) in a Web Series	Won	

== Filmfare OTT Awards ==
The Filmfare OTT Awards are a set of awards that honor artistic and technical excellence in the Hindi-language original programming over-the-top space of India.

This is her second nomination in the OTT arena in the same year, for which she won her first Filmfare award in the OTT arena.

Year	Work	Category	Result	Ref.
2021	The Family Man (Season 2)	Best Actress in a Drama Series	Won	

== Other recognitions ==
Year	Event	Work	Category	Result	Ref.
2014	Margadarsi Big Telugu Entertainment Awards	Attarintiki Daredi	Best Actress	Won	
2015	RITZ Solitaire Award	Works and contribution in films	Solitaire	Won	
2015	2nd BehindWoods Gold Medal Awards	Kaththi and Anjaan	Best Actress (People's Choice)	Won	
2016	RITZ Southscope Lifestyle Awards	Style in Cinema	South India’s Most Admired Fashion Icon	Won	
2017	4th BehindWoods Gold Medal Awards	24 and Theri	Best Actress (People's Choice)	Won	
2018	2nd Social Media Summit and Awards	For her films	Most Liked South Indian Actress	Won	
2018	Sri Kala Sudha Telugu Movie Award	Rangasthalam	Best Actress	Won	
2019	TV9 Nava Nakshatra Sanmanam Award	Rangasthalam, Mahanati and Oh! Baby	Best Actor (Female)	Won	

=== Times of India ===
Year	Category	Rank	Ref.
2013	Hyderabad Times Most Desirable Woman 2012	#9	
2013	Chennai Times Most Desirable Woman 2012	#2	
2014	Hyderabad Times Most Desirable Woman 2013	#12	
2014	Chennai Times Most Desirable Woman 2013	#4	
2015	Hyderabad Times Most Desirable Woman 2014	#9	
2015	Chennai Times Most Desirable Woman 2014	#3	
2016	Hyderabad Times Most Desirable Woman 2015	#5	
2016	Chennai Times Most Desirable Woman 2015	#7	
2017	Hyderabad Times Most Desirable Woman 2016	#12	
2017	Chennai Times Most Desirable Woman 2016	#3	
2018	Hyderabad Times Most Desirable Woman 2017	#21	
2018	Chennai Times Most Desirable Woman 2017	#16	
2019	Hyderabad Times Most Desirable Woman 2018	#3	
2019	Chennai Times Most Desirable Woman 2018	#3	
2020	Hyderabad Times Most Desirable Woman 2019	#1	
2020	Chennai Times Most Desirable Woman 2019	#7	
2020	India's Top 50 Most Desirable Woman 2019	#17	
2021	Hyderabad Times Most Desirable Woman 2020	#2	
2021	Chennai Times Most Desirable Woman 2020	#1	
2021	India's Top 50 Most Desirable Woman 2020	#34	

=== IMDb ===
Year	Category	Rank	Ref.
2021	Top 10 Indian Web Series of 2021 - The Family Man Tv Series (Season 2)	#3	

=== Social Networks ===
Year	Category	Rank	Ref.
2021	Most Tweeted about Actors (Female) in South Indian Entertainment	#3	

== See also ==
- Samantha Ruth Prabhu filmography
