= B. V. Nandini Reddy =

Indian film director

Nandini Reddy
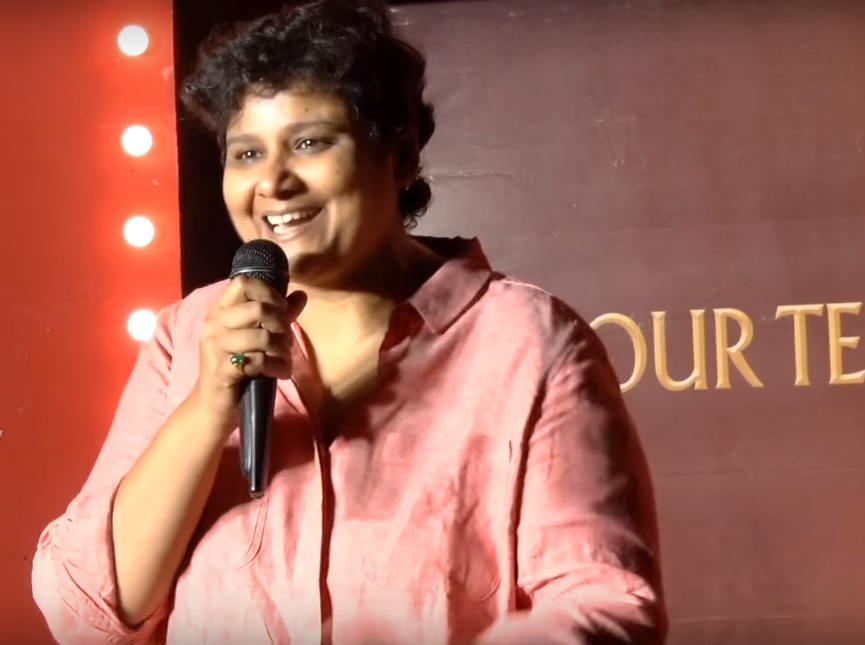
- Reddy at the success meet of Mahanati in 2018
- Born: Hyderabad, Andhra Pradesh (present day Telangana), India
- Occupations: Film director, screenwriter
- Years active: 2011–present

B. V. Nandini Reddy is an Indian film director and screenwriter who works in Telugu cinema and television. She debuted with 2011 Telugu film, Ala Modalaindi.

== Early life ==
Nandini Reddy was born in Hyderabad. Her father Bharath. V. Reddy was a Chartered accountant who is originally from Chittoor district, and is settled in Bangalore. Her mother Roopa Reddy is from the "Pingle" family hailing from Warangal district. Nandini has a younger brother named Uttam Reddy.

Reddy was educated at St. Ann's High School, Secunderabad, and earned a degree at Women's College, Koti. She also holds a master's degree in politic science from Jawaharlal Nehru University, New Delhi. She was active in dramatics, elocution and cricket throughout her school and college years. She is also one of the judges in a Telugu reality TV show Adhurs.

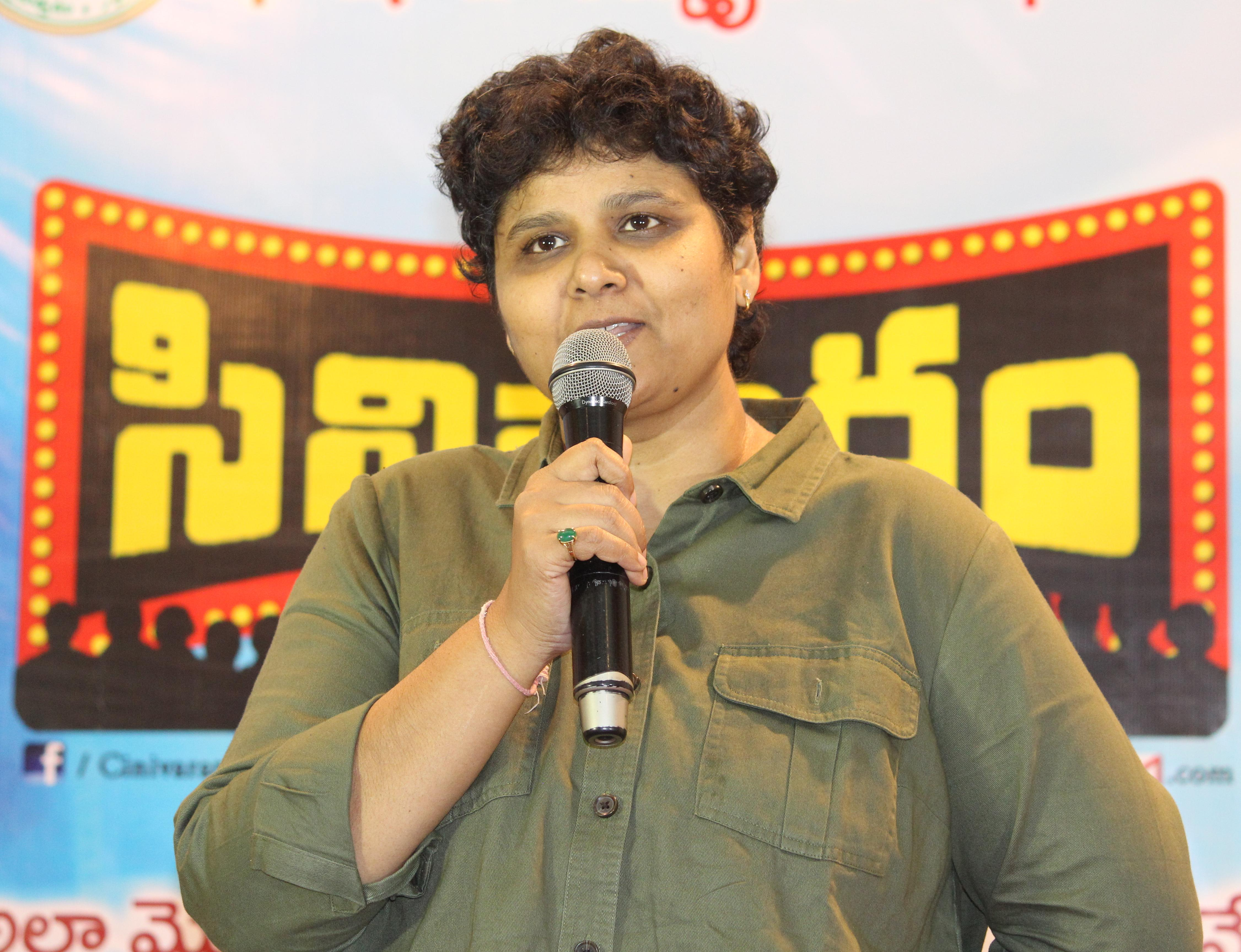
Nandini Reddy in Cinivaram, Ravindra Bharathi, Hyderabad

== Career ==
Reddy was introduced to Gangaraju Gunnam through a mutual friend and in 1995 she worked on his children's film, Little Soldiers, as an assistant director. After that film was released, cinematographer Rasool Ellore introduced her to Krishna Vamsi, who refused at the time to take her into his team. She was idle for a year before being offered work on the Kannada film Santhi Santhi Santhi. Actress Ramya Krishnan then persuaded Vamsi to take her for his next film, Chandralekha (1998). She became an integral part of Vamsi's team till the filming of Murari (2001) and Shakti, the Hindi remake of Anthahpuram (1998).

Vamsi sent Reddy to Daggubati Suresh Babu, with whom she has worked for Suresh Productions.

In 2019, she directed her fourth film Oh! Baby, starring Samantha Ruth Prabhu. Produced by People's Media Productions and Guru Films along with Suresh Productions, this is the second time Samantha and Reddy worked together.

== Filmography ==
=== Film ===
Key
†	Denotes films that have not yet been released

Film credits
Year	Title	Notes and Ref.
2011	Ala Modalaindi	
2013	Jabardasth	
2016	Kalyana Vaibhogame	
2019	Oh! Baby	
2021	Pitta Kathalu	Segment: Meera
2023	Anni Manchi Sakunamule	
2026	Maa Inti Bangaaram	

=== Television ===
Television credits
Year	Title	Network	Role	Notes
2013	Adhurs	ETV	Judge	
2017	Mana Mugguri Love Story	YuppTV	Creator	
2018	Gangstars	Amazon Prime Video	Creator	
2020-2021	Sam Jam	Aha	Creative Producer	

== Awards ==
- Nandi Award for Best First Film of a Director (2010) for Ala Modalaindi
- Nominated – Filmfare Award for Best Director – Telugu for Ala Modalaindi
- Hyderabad Times Film Awards 2011 – Best Screenplay for Ala Modalaindi.
- SIIMA Award for Best Debut Director (Telugu) [2011] for Ala Modalaindi.
- Nominated - SIIMA Award for Best Director - Telugu for Oh! Baby
