= Maa Inti Bangaaram =

2026 Indian film by B. V. Nandini Reddy

- Theatrical release poster
- Directed by: B. V. Nandini Reddy
- Screenplay by: Raj Nidimoru; Vasanth Maringanti; Prahas Boppudi
- Story by: Raj Nidimoru
- Produced by: Samantha; Raj Nidimoru; Himank Duvvuru
- Starring: Samantha; Gulshan Devaiah; Diganth Manchale
- Cinematography: Om Prakash
- Edited by: Dharmendra Kakarala
- Music by: Santhosh Narayanan
- Production company: Tralala Moving Pictures
- Release date: 19 June 2026
- Running time: 154 minutes
- Country: India
- Language: Telugu
- Budget: ₹200 million
- Box office: ₹1 billion

Maa Inti Bangaaram (transl. 'Our home's dearest', lit. 'The gold of our home') is a 2026 Indian Telugu-language action comedy drama film created by Raj Nidimoru, directed by B. V. Nandini Reddy and produced by Samantha Ruth Prabhu, Raj Nidimoru and Himank Duvvuru under Tralala Moving Pictures. The film stars Samantha in the lead role, alongside Gulshan Devaiah and Diganth Manchale.

The film's music is composed by Santhosh Narayanan, cinematography is by Om Prakash, and editing is by Dharmendra Kakarala. The film was released on 19 June 2026, and became a massive box office success. Maa Inti Bangaaram is currently the highest-grossing female-led Telugu film, surpassing Mahanati (2018).

== Plot ==
The story introduces Swarna (Jhansi), a woman who has left behind a dangerous and violent past. She enters a traditional household and tries to become part of a loving family. To everyone around her, she appears to be a simple, caring woman who wants nothing more than a peaceful domestic life. She builds a relationship with her husband Anirudh, a doctor, and slowly gains the affection of the family members. The early part of the film focuses on her attempts to fit into the household, understand its traditions, and prove that she belongs there.

However, small hints reveal that Swarna is hiding something. Her unusual confidence, quick reactions, and ability to handle threats suggest that she is not the ordinary homemaker everyone believes her to be. The peaceful family life begins to collapse when people connected to Swarna’s past life appear again. Her secret identity starts becoming a danger—not only to herself but also to the family that has accepted her.

Swarna is forced to confront the part of herself she tried to bury. The people around her begin questioning who she really is and why she hid the truth. The film gradually reveals that Swarna was once involved in a much more dangerous world. The skills she tries to suppress are the same skills she now needs to protect her family. The antagonist, played by Gulshan Devaiah, represents the threat from her old life and pushes her to stop running from who she was. As the danger reaches the family, Swarna stops trying to hide her abilities. The woman who appeared to be a quiet homemaker reveals her strength and becomes the protector of the household.

Swarna has a past where she goes by the name Jhansi. After constant fear of abuse and harassment, she meets Karunas-a rebel. He makes her believe that he is committing to violence for a good cause. But he has been secretly betraying his own followers for his own gain. He has an obsession with Swarna. But she secretly informs the police after getting to know about true side of Karuna. After spending years in prison, he gets information that Jhansi is back. He escapes from prison to pursue Jhansi only to find that she is married and has a family. He does everything possible to destroy her family to get her back. The story revolves around how she protects her family.

The final portion turns into a full action drama, where Swarna faces the people threatening her family. Her fight is not only physical—it is also about proving that her past does not define her completely. The climax revolves around Swarna accepting both sides of herself, the woman who wants a normal family life, and the fighter who can protect the people she loves. The family eventually understands the sacrifices she made and the reasons behind her secrets. The story closes with Swarna finding acceptance rather than simply escaping from her past.

The title Maa Inti Bangaaram (“the gold of our home”) becomes symbolic: Swarna is not valued because she is perfect or because she has no past, but because she protects and holds together the family she has chosen.

== Cast ==
- Samantha Ruth Prabhu as Alluri Swarna/Jhansi
- Gulshan Devaiah as Karuna
- Diganth Manchale as Dr. Alluri Anirudh Raju,"Ani" Swarna's husband
- Manjusha Mukkavilli as Kiranmayi, Swarna's best friend
- Chaitanya Krishna as SI Alluri Sharath Raju, Anirudh’s younger brother
- Sreemukhi as Alluri Anasuya, Sharath’s wife
- Anand as Alluri Ramaiah Raju, Anirudh and Sharath's father and a politician
- Gautami as Alluri Kamakshi, Anirudh and Sharath's mother
- Sri Lakshmi as Anirudh and Sharath's grandmother
- Srinivas Gavireddy as Buchiraju, Anirudh and Sharath's brother-in-law
- Aryan Ippili as Shravani, Buchiraju’s wife; Anirudh and Sharath's sister
- Rachana Sahadeva as Alluri Geetha, Anirudh and Sharath's younger sister
- Vadlamani Srinivas as Madhusudhan Rao, Ramaiah Raju’s rival
- Gemini Suresh as Ramaiah Raju’s assistant
- Vennela Kishore as Kiranmayi's husband (cameo appearance)

== Production ==
On 5 October 2025, Samantha announced a new project in the lead role, revealing the film's title as Maa Inti Bangaaram. The film is directed by B. V. Nandini Reddy, reuniting with Samantha for the third time after Jabardasth (2013) and Oh! Baby (2019), the story is created by Raj Nidimoru. Produced by Raj, Samantha and Himank Reddy Duvvuru under the banner Tralala Moving Pictures, this is the second film of the production company after Subham (2025). Gulshan Devaiah joined the cast of the film. Principal photography with pooja ceremony began at Hyderabad on 27 October 2025.

== Music ==
Maa Inti Bangaaram

Soundtrack album by Santhosh Narayanan
- Released: 20 June 2026
- Studios: Prism Studios; Rakitaa Studios; Future Tense Studios,Chennai
- Genre: Feature film soundtrack
- Length: 24:44
- Language: Telugu
- Label: Think Music
- Producer: Santhosh Narayanan

Santhosh Narayanan chronology
Vaa Vaathiyaar (2026)	Maa Inti Bangaaram (2026)	Balaramana Dinagalu (2026)

The film's music is composed by Santhosh Narayanan. The film's music rights were acquired by Think Music.

=== Track listing ===
No.	Title	Lyrics	Singer(s)	Length
1.	"Thassadiya"	Rehman	Chinmayi Sripada, Punya Selva	3:35
2.	"I Can Get Hungry"	Rehman, Ranj (Rap)	Ranj, Punya Selva	3:13
3.	"Lets Comeon"	Santhosh Narayanan	Santhosh Narayanan	4:13
4.	"Ninnu Choosthu Adige Aakasam"	Rehman	Punya Selva	3:25
5.	"Baby Driver"	Instrumental	Santhosh Narayanan, Arul Raj	3:04
6.	"Jhansi Rani"	Instrumental	Santhosh Narayanan, 808Krshna	2:21
7.	"Queen Swarna"	Instrumental	Santhosh Narayanan	0:57
8.	"Swarna"	Instrumental	Santhosh Narayanan, Arul Raj	1:48
9.	"Truce - Trailer Theme"	Instrumental	Santhosh Narayanan	2:08
Total length:				24:44

== Release and reception ==
Maa Inti Bangaaram was released worldwide on 19 June 2026. Apart from the original Telugu language, the film was also released in Tamil language with the title Engal Thangam (transl. Our Gold). Initially the film's was originally scheduled release on 15 May 2026.

=== Critical reception ===
Sanjana Pulugurtha of The Times of India rated the film 3.5/5 stars and wrote, "The film may not reinvent the action-drama template, but it reshapes it around a female protagonist who is allowed to be both vulnerable and formidable. In a genre often driven by swagger, that feels like a refreshing choice".

=== Home media ===
The post-theatrical digital streaming rights were acquired by JioHotstar and began streaming from 17 July 2026 in Telugu with dubbed version of Tamil, Malayalam, Kannada. The Hindi version is streaming on Sony LIV.

== Box office ==
The film grossed ₹50 crore worldwide in its opening weekend, also including the domestic gross collection of ₹32.69 crore. After the first Monday, the total worldwide gross was ₹46.04 crore. The film grossed ₹55.71 crore in the first six days.
