= Sam Jam =

Indian web television talk show

- Genre: Talk show
- Developed by: Allu Aravind
- Written by: Anirudh Krishnamurthy
- Directed by: Arun Seshkumar
- Creative director: B. V. Nandini Reddy
- Presented by: Samantha Ruth Prabhu
- Country of origin: India
- Original language: Telugu
- No. of seasons: 1
- No. of episodes: 08

Production
- Executive producer: Kishore Poluru
- Producers: Fazila Allana; Kamna Menezes
- Production locations: Hyderabad, Telangana, India
- Cinematography: R Diwakaran
- Editor: Raja Sekhar
- Camera setup: Multi-camera
- Production company: Geetha Arts

Original release
- Network: aha
- Release: 13 November 2020 – 8 January 2021

Sam Jam is an Indian Telugu-language talk show hosted by Samantha Ruth Prabhu. Directed by Arun Seshkumar and created by Allu Aravind, the show premiered on 13 November 2020 on the streaming platform Aha. It marks Samantha's second show as a host following the Telugu television reality series Bigg Boss 4.

== Concept ==
Guests who have come to the show share various experiences of their own. Host Samantha asks various questions about their personal lives. Comedian Harsha Chemudu will be there along with Samantha and do some funny activities. Anyone from the audience can ask a question to the guest. Also, Samantha asks a few things to the audience. In some episodes, talented artists from various fields perform their skills. Mini tasks will be conducted by Samantha, and the guests may win prizes.

== Production ==
In the early 2020, producer Allu Aravind announced that a new talk show is about to launch on aha. But due to the COVID-19 pandemic, the show got delayed. Finally, the show was officially announced on 6 November 2020. A promotional press meet was held that day. Allu Aravind announced that Samantha is hosting the show, and B. V. Nandini Reddy will be the creative director of the show.

== Episodes ==
Vijay Deverakonda is the first guest to enter the show followed by Rana Daggubati, Nag Ashwin, Tamannaah Bhatia, Saina Nehwal, Parupalli Kashyap, Rakul Preet Singh, Krish Jagarlamudi, Chiranjeevi and Allu Arjun.

Episode	Premiere	Guest(s)
1	13 November 2020	Vijay Deverakonda
Vijay shared about his personal life and much more.
2	27 November 2020	Rana Daggubati, Nag Ashwin
Rana shared about his health issues, while Ashwin shared about his journey with the film Mahanati.
3	4 December 2020	Saina Nehwal, Parupalli Kashyap
Kashyap and Saina shared about their personal lives. Sudhir, India's first Flute Boxer, performed flute beatboxing on the stage.
4	11 December 2020	Tamannaah Bhatia
Tamannaah shared memories about her long journey in Tollywood and much more.
5	18 December 2020	Rakul Preet Singh, Krish Jagarlamudi
Rakul and Krish have both revealed how they faced controversies and have also shared their experiences in Tollywood.
6	25 December 2020	Chiranjeevi
7	1 January 2021	Allu Arjun, Allu Aravind
8	8 January 2021	Naga Chaitanya

== Reception ==
While writing about the talk show, Karthik Keramalu of Film Companion stated that: "There’s a certain casualness and a sense of intimacy when a celebrity interviews another, and that seems to be the USP of many new talk shows in Telugu." Sakshi Post criticized the show by opining that Sam Jam is mishmash of other several Telugu programmes like Bathuku Jatka Bandi, Ali tho Saradaga and Cash.
