= A Aa =

2016 film by Trivikram Srinivas

- Theatrical release poster
- Directed by: Trivikram Srinivas
- Written by: Yaddanapudi Sulochana Rani (Story); Trivikram Srinivas (Screenplay & Dialogues)
- Based on: Meena by Yaddanapudi Sulochana Rani
- Produced by: S. Radha Krishna
- Starring: Nithiin; Samantha; Anupama Parameswaran
- Narrated by: Samantha
- Cinematography: Natty Subramaniam; Dudley
- Edited by: Kotagiri Venkateswara Rao
- Music by: Mickey J Meyer
- Production company: Haarika & Hassine Creations
- Release date: 2 June 2016
- Running time: 153 minutes
- Country: India
- Language: Telugu
- Budget: ₹25 crore
- Box office: est. ₹75.4 crore

A Aa (Note: Also known as Anasuya Ramalingam vs Anand Vihari) is a 2016 Indian Telugu-language romantic action comedy film written and directed by Trivikram Srinivas and produced by S. Radha Krishna under Haarika & Hassine Creations. The film stars Nithiin, Samantha and Anupama Parameswaran. Mickey J. Meyer composed the score and soundtrack.

The film is loosely based on Yaddanapudi Sulochana Rani's novel Meena, which has earlier been adapted into the 1973 film Meena by Vijaya Nirmala, starring Krishna. The plot follows Anasuya Ramalingam, daughter of Mahalakshmi, a rich and strict businesswoman, who falls in love with her cross-cousin, Aanand, an ex-chef, when she is sent to visit her aunt in a village.

Launched officially in September 2015, the film's principal photography took place in October 2015 and ended in April 2016. The film was released on 2 June 2016, after multiple postponements. Samantha won several accolades including a Best Actress award at the 64th Filmfare Awards South and Best Performance in a Leading Role at the 2nd IIFA Utsavam Awards, for her portrayal as Anasuya Ramalingam. The film was commercially successful at the box office, and was one of the highest-grossing Telugu films of 2016.

== Plot ==
Anasuya Ramalingam, a 23-year-old woman from Hyderabad, lives under the thumb of her strict, overbearing mother, Mahalakshmi, while sharing a close bond with her father, Ramalingam. When Mahalakshmi leaves for a business trip, Ramalingam secretly sends Anasuya to their ancestral village of Kalavapudi near Vijayawada to spend time with their estranged extended family. On her journey, she is escorted by her cross cousin Aanand Vihari, a chef. Aanand is struggling to clear his late father's debts and arrange the marriage of his younger sister, Bhanumathi aka Bhanu.

In Kalavapudi, Anasuya relishes the warmth of her extended family, despite playfully bickering with Aanand. She soon discovers that Aanand is being pressured to marry Nagavalli, the daughter of local landlord Pallam Venkanna, to clear his father's debts. Unwilling to marry her, Aanand uses Bhanu's pending wedding as an excuse to stall the proposal. Sensing Nagavalli's jealousy, Anasuya deliberately acts close to Aanand to irritate her. In retaliation, Venkanna attempts to inform Mahalakshmi of Anasuya's whereabouts. To avert Mahalakshmi's wrath, Ramalingam urges Aanand to return Anasuya home before Mahalakshmi returns.

Back in Hyderabad, Anasuya realizes that she has fallen in love with Aanand. However, Mahalakshmi arranges her engagement with Shekhar, a wealthy bachelor. Anasuya sabotages their meeting at a golf course by accidentally hitting Shekar in the face with a golf ball. In the hospital, she encounters Aanand and Bhanu, learning that their mother, Kameshwari, was hospitalized after she suffered from a stroke following Venkanna's humiliation over their financial status. Anasuya invites Bhanu to stay at her home, but Mahalakshmi reluctantly accepts. She reveals her feud with her sister-in-law, Kameshwari, whom she blames for spurning her after she failed to repay an old loan to her brother, Krishnamoorthy, that led to the auction of their ancestral home and his eventual suicide.

Determined to break off her engagement, Anasuya strikes a deal with Bhanu to distract Shekar while she meets Aanand. However, Shekar falls in love with Bhanu. When Anasuya proposes to Aanand, he hesitantly rejects her, revealing the entire truth about their families' rift. Haunted by his father's final warning not to sacrifice his well-wishers' happiness for others like he did for Mahalakshmi, Aanand refuses to compromise with his family's future and rejects her proposal.

Mahalakshmi discovers that Shekhar loves Bhanu instead of Anasuya and locks her daughter away. Outraged, Anasuya escapes and begs Anand to elope, but he refuses out of respect for Ramalingam. As the distraught Anasuya wanders away, she is abducted by Venkanna's henchmen. Aanand rescues her and brings her back to the engagement venue. However, upon being confronted by Bhanu about his feelings for Anasuya, he publicly confesses his love for her and confronts Mahalakshmi for her past mistakes, asserting that their families would have stayed united if she had consoled his mother following his father's death instead of offering to repay the loan.

Aanand leaves the venue with Anasuya and Bhanu and arrives home, where they are surprised to find Ramalingam and Mahalakshmi waiting. Ramalingam reveals that after their departure, Mahalakshmi suffered a panic attack, forcing her to confront her past misdeeds and consent to their union. The families reconcile, and Shekar arrives shortly after to seek Bhanu's hand in marriage. Meanwhile, a bitter Nagavalli stubbornly copes with the turn of events, holding out hope that Aanand might one day return to her.

== Cast ==
- Samantha as Anasuya Ramalingam "Anu" (Voice dubbed by Chinmayi)
- Nithiin as Anand Vihari "Nandu"
- Anupama Parameswaran as Nagavalli "Valli" Pallam Venkanna’s daughter, Aanand's former fiancée
- Ananya as Bhanumathi "Bhanu", Anand's sister (Voice Dubbed by Haritha)
- Srinivas Avasarala as Shekar, Anu's former fiancée, and Bhanu's love interest
- Nadhiya as Mahalakshmi, Anu's mother (Voice dubbed by Saritha)
- Naresh as Ramalingam, Anu's father
- Rao Ramesh as Pallam Venkanna, Nagavalli’s father
- Easwari Rao as Kameshwari, Nandu's mother (Voice dubbed by Shilpa)
- Jayaprakash as Krishnamurthy, Nandu's father
- Hari Teja as Mangamma, Anu's househelp and personal assistant
- Srinivasa Reddy as Gopal, Mahalakshmi's secretary
- Ajay as Pallam Venkanna's son and Valli's brother
- Posani Krishna Murali as Pallam Narayana, Pallam Venkanna's brother
- Giri Babu as Banerjee, Shekar's grandfather
- Shanoor Sana as Latha, Mahalakshmi's friend
- Raghu Babu as Raghu, Latha's boyfriend
- Praveen as Muthyam, Nandu's friend and labour
- Shakalaka Shankar as Pratap, thief who wanted to steal in Nandu's house
- Sri Sudha Bheemireddy as Anu's acting teacher
- Annapoorna as Baby Mamma, an old woman in Nandu's village
- Rajitha as Baby Mamma's relative
- Karate Kalyani as Baby Mamma's relative
- Heroshini Komali as Nandu's youngest sister
- Chammak Chandra as Bhanu's former fiancée
- Gundu Hanumantha Rao as Bhanu's former prospective father-in-law, (Chammak Chandra)'s father
- Sivannarayana Naripeddi as a doctor

== Production ==
=== Development ===
In August 2015, it was announced that Trivikram Srinivas will be directing a movie with Nithiin and Samantha, and S. Radha Krishna will produce the film under his banner Haarika & Haasine Creations. It was also announced that Anirudh Ravichander will compose music for the film, marking his Tollywood debut. On 10 September 2015, the makers announced the title of the film as A Aa, with the tagline Anasuya Ramalingam vs Anand Vihari, resembling the names of the two lead characters in the film. The film was launched on 24 September 2015, at Ramanaidu Studios in Nanakramguda, Hyderabad.

=== Casting ===
Samantha Ruth Prabhu makes her third collaboration with Trivikram Srinivas after Attarintiki Daredi (2013) and S/O Satyamurthy (2015). During mid September Anupama Parameswaran was confirmed to be a part of the film playing the second heroine. During Mid September, it was reported that Nadhiya will be playing a key role in this film. During Early October 2015, it was reported that Srinivas Avasarala was a part the film playing a key role. In early November it was reported that Ananya was selected to play the role of Nithiin's sister Bhanumathi. It was also reported that she had initially turned down the offer, but later accepted it after she realized the scope of her character. During Mid-January it was reported that Naresh will be a part of this film. It was also reported that he will be playing husband of Nadhiya.

=== Crew ===
Anirudh Ravichander was originally selected to compose the music for this film. However, he was later replaced by Mickey J Meyer, as he opted out of the project, due to his busy schedules with Tamil films. The cinematography was initially handled by Natty Subramaniam and was later taken over by Dudley, after the former left the project midway. Kotagiri Venkateswara Rao was confirmed as the film's editor, and Rajeevan was signed in to handle the production design, although he was replaced by A. S. Prakash as the art director during late November 2015.

=== Filming ===
The regular shooting of this film was expected to start on 10 October 2015, although the shooting of the film being delayed to 16 October. Samantha started shooting for this film on 21 October 2015, whereas on the same day, Nithiin filmed the fight sequences of the film, at the Ramoji Film City in Hyderabad, which were filmed under the supervision of stunt choreographer Ravi Varma. In November 2015, it was reported that Samantha would be dubbing for her role for the first time in Telugu, which was later refuted by Samantha herself on early 2016.

As of early February 2016, 80 percent of the shooting is completed and also the major part of the talkie portions have been shot. The team headed to Pollachi on 15 February, and the unit canned a romantic duet and some important scenes featuring Nithiin and Samantha for 10 days. Filming of final schedule commenced on 26 February in Hyderabad. The principal photography of the film was wrapped up on 23 April 2016.

== Soundtrack ==
The film's soundtrack and background music is composed by Mickey J. Meyer, collaborating with Trivikram Srinivas for the first time. The album features five tracks, with lyrics written by Ramajogayya Sastry and Krishna Chaitanya. The audio rights of the film were acquired by Aditya Music. The film's soundtrack album was released on 1 May 2016, at a launch event in Shilpakala Vedika at Hyderabad, with actor Pawan Kalyan attending as chief guest.

== Release ==
Producer S. Radha Krishna had initially planned to release the film on 14 January 2016, coinciding with Sankranthi, but later the release date was moved to 14 February 2016 to release it on Valentine's Day. During early February, the makers postponed the release of the film to 22 April 2016. The release was further postponed to 6 May 2016, and later to 20 May, due to the release of Suriya's 24 (2016). But the film was postponed to 3 June, due to Mahesh Babu's Brahmotsavam (2016) as a majority of the theaters were occupied for the film. On 26 May 2016, the makers announced that the release of the film was preponed to 2 June.

BlueSky Cinemas, one of the leading players in overseas market for Indian movies bought the rights of this film during early November 2015. They bought the rights of this film before the filming began. During the end of December 2015, Eurotolly bought rights from BlueSky Cinemas to distribute this movie in Europe (excluding UK).

== Reception ==
=== Critical reception ===
Sangeetha Devi Dundoo of The Hindu wrote "Simple tale, effectively told. Trivikram Srinivas narrates an enjoyable tale of romance and relationships". The Times of India gave 3 out of 5 stars stating "Trivikram really gives this modern take an edge of its own and sets it apart from both the book and the earlier film, Meena (1973). Mickey J Meyer's music which is refreshing and the camerawork of [Natty] and Dudley who give the film a visual splendour". The New Indian Express gave 3 out of 5 stars stating "Trivikram Srinivas masterfully elevates a simple story into a romantic comedy. A..Aa undoubtedly is Samantha's film, she delivers a stellar performance and shows what she can do if given ample screen time. Nithiin delivers his finest performance too". Daily News and Analysis gave 3 out of 5 stars stating "A...Aa a film that adds humour to a regular boy-girl romance which should be seen to be experienced. Samantha and Nithiin's performances in this movie will be what people will rave about for days to come". Jeevi of Idlebrain.com gave 3.25 out of 5 stars stating "Plus points of the film are Trivikram dialogues, Samantha and emotional scenes. On the flipside, the flashback of the film which is the foundation looks little hazy and the pace in second half should have been faster".

=== Box office ===
A Aa collected ₹38.15 crore gross and ₹26.68 crore share worldwide in the first weekend. In the second week movie collected a total of ₹67.4 crore gross and ₹44.38 crore share worldwide in two weeks. In its lifetime movie collected a total gross of ₹75.4 crore and share of ₹47.48 crore worldwide.

A Aa collected $1.5 million in its first weekend, and collected over $2 Million in its full run at United States boxoffice, which is third highest grossing Telugu film in the US at that time.

== Awards and nominations ==
Date of ceremony	Award	Category	Recipient(s) and nominee(s)	Result	Ref.
24 March 2017	Zee Cine Awards Telugu	Queen of Boxoffice	Samantha	Won	
24 March 2017	Zee Cine Awards Telugu	Girl Next Door	Anupama Parameswaran	Won	
24 March 2017	Zee Cine Awards Telugu	Newbie of the Year Female	Anupama Parameswaran	Nominated	
28 & 29 March 2017	2nd IIFA Utsavam	Best Actress – Telugu	Samantha	Won	
28 & 29 March 2017	2nd IIFA Utsavam	Best Actress in a Supporting Role – Telugu	Nadhiya	Nominated	
28 & 29 March 2017	2nd IIFA Utsavam	Best Actor in a Negative Role – Telugu	Rao Ramesh	Nominated	
17 June 2017	64th Filmfare Awards South	Best Film – Telugu	A Aa	Nominated	
17 June 2017	64th Filmfare Awards South	Best Director – Telugu	Trivikram Srinivas	Nominated	
17 June 2017	64th Filmfare Awards South	Best Actress – Telugu	Samantha	Won	
17 June 2017	64th Filmfare Awards South	Best Supporting Actor – Telugu	Rao Ramesh	Nominated	
17 June 2017	64th Filmfare Awards South	Best Supporting Actress – Telugu	Anupama Parameswaran	Nominated	
17 June 2017	64th Filmfare Awards South	Best Music Director – Telugu	Mickey J. Meyer	Nominated	
17 June 2017	64th Filmfare Awards South	Best Male Playback Singer – Telugu	Karthik	Won	
30 June and 1 July 2017	6th South Indian International Movie Awards	SIIMA Award for Best Film (Telugu)	Haarika & Hassine Creations	Nominated	
30 June and 1 July 2017	6th South Indian International Movie Awards	SIIMA Award for Best Actor (Telugu)	Nithiin	Nominated	
30 June and 1 July 2017	6th South Indian International Movie Awards	SIIMA Award for Best Director (Telugu)	Trivikram Srinivas	Nominated	
30 June and 1 July 2017	6th South Indian International Movie Awards	SIIMA Award for Best Actress (Telugu)	Samantha	Nominated	
30 June and 1 July 2017	6th South Indian International Movie Awards	SIIMA Award for Best Supporting Actress (Telugu)	Nadhiya	Nominated	
30 June and 1 July 2017	6th South Indian International Movie Awards	SIIMA Award for Best Music Director (Telugu)	Mickey J. Meyer	Nominated	
30 June and 1 July 2017	6th South Indian International Movie Awards	SIIMA Award for Best Female Playback Singer (Telugu)	Ramya Behara	Won	
12 August 2017	15th Santosham Film Awards	Best Actress	Samantha	Won	
14 November 2017	Nandi Awards	Best Music Director	Mickey J. Meyer	Won	
