= Jabardasth (film) =

2013 film directed by B.V. Nandini Reddy

- Directed by: B.V. Nandini Reddy
- Written by: B. V. Nandini Reddy
- Produced by: Bellamkonda Suresh
- Starring: Siddharth; Samantha Ruth Prabhu; Nithya Menen
- Cinematography: Mahesh Muthuswami; Sanjay Loknath
- Edited by: Kotagiri Venkateswara Rao
- Music by: S. Thaman
- Production company: Sri Sai Ganesh Productions
- Distributed by: 7SEAS Inc (Overseas)
- Release date: 22 February 2013
- Running time: 150 minutes
- Country: India
- Language: Telugu

Jabardasth is a 2013 Indian Telugu-language romantic comedy film written and directed by Nandini Reddy and stars Siddharth, Samantha Ruth Prabhu and Nithya Menen in lead roles. The film released on 22 February 2013 and was commercial failure at the box office.

The film is inspired by 2010 Hindi film Band Baaja Baaraat. Yash Raj Films, producers of the Hindi film, claimed that Jabardasth is an unofficial remake and planned to take legal action against its makers.

== Plot ==
Bokka Bairraju (Siddharth) is an inscrutable rascal. Shreya (Samantha) is a suave urban girl who dreams of becoming a wedding planner. The two join hands to float an event management company. Shreya develops feelings for Bairraju, but he just can't think beyond getting rich, so the two fall apart. But they are forced to plan one final wedding together

== Cast ==
- Siddharth as Bairraju
- Samantha Ruth Prabhu as Shreya
- Nithya Menen as Saraswati
- Srihari as Javed Ibrahim
- Raghu Babu as Raghu, Bairraju's friend
- Sayaji Shinde as Bihar Yadav
- Pragathi as Shreya's mother
- Thagubothu Ramesh as Ramesh
- Vennela Kishore as Software Subramanyam
- Suresh as Vamshi Krishna
- Arjunan as Bairraju's friend
- Dharmavarapu Subramanyam as Dance master
- Telangana Shakuntala
- Dhanraj
- Y. Kasi Viswanath
- Venu as Dance master
- Duvvasi Mohan
- Uttej
- Kadambari Kiran
- Geeta Bhagat
- Sushma
- Seeta Reddy
- Swapnika Reddy
- Prince Cecil as cameo appearance

== Soundtrack ==
Jabardasth

Soundtrack album to Jabardasth by S. Thaman
- Released: 1 February 2013
- Recorded: 2012–2013
- Genre: Feature film soundtrack
- Length: 21:06
- Language: Telugu
- Label: Aditya Music

S. Thaman chronology
Settai (2013)	Jabardasth (2013)	Shadow (2013)

The music was composed by Thaman S.

No.	Title	Artist(s)	Length
1.	"Arere Arere"	Nithya Menon	05:11
2.	"Allah Allah"	Shreya Ghoshal, Ranjith, Naveen Madhav	04:25
3.	"Meghamala"	Muralidhar, Rahul, Vandana, Rita, Megha	05:34
4.	"Tees Maar Khan"	Naveen Madhu	03:12
5.	"Lashkar Pori"	Muralidhar	03:30
Total length:			21:06

== Critical reception ==
Idlebrain.com's Jeevi gave a rating of 3/5 for the film. Rediff wrote:"First half was fun but second half was dragged".
