= 24 (2016 film) =

2016 film directed by Vikram Kumar

- Theatrical release poster
- Directed by: Vikram Kumar
- Written by: Vikram Kumar
- Produced by: K. E. Gnanavel Raja; Suriya
- Starring: Suriya; Samantha; Nithya Menen
- Cinematography: Tirru
- Edited by: Prawin Pudi
- Music by: A. R. Rahman
- Production company: 2D Entertainment
- Distributed by: Eros International; Studio Green
- Release date: 6 May 2016
- Running time: 160 minutes
- Country: India
- Language: Tamil
- Budget: ₹70 crore
- Box office: est. ₹100 crore

24 is a 2016 Indian Tamil-language science fiction thriller film written and directed by Vikram Kumar. It is produced by Suriya under 2D Entertainment. The film stars Suriya in triple roles, alongside Samantha Ruth Prabhu (in her 25th film) and Nithya Menen. Saranya Ponvannan, Ajay, Girish Karnad, Mohan Raman, Sudha, Sathyan and Charle appear in the supporting roles. The film follows Sethuraman, a scientist, who invents a time travel watch but Athreya, his twin brother, does everything he can to get hands on that.

The film's development dates back to 2009, at which time it was to star Vikram and Ileana D'Cruz. However, in February 2010, the project was dropped due to the difference in opinions between the director, producer, and actor, facing rejection of the refined script. In August 2014, Suriya agreed to produce and act in the film, with principal photography commencing in Mumbai in April 2015, continuing in Nasik, Goregaon and Pune. The second phase of filming was done in Poland by the end of September 2015. Filming was completed in Chennai by November 2015. Produced by 2D Entertainment, the film has cinematography by S. Tirru. The soundtrack and film score were composed by A. R. Rahman, with lyrics by Vairamuthu and Madhan Karky.

24 was released on 6 May 2016. The film was a critical and commercial success, and won two awards at the 64th National Film Awards – Best Cinematography and Best Production Design. Suriya won the Critics Best Actor Award at the 64th Filmfare Awards.

== Plot ==
In 1990, Sethuraman is a scientist and renowned watchmaker who lives with his wife Priya and newborn son Manikandan. On 13 January, he completes his invention of a time-travelling watch: Project 24. His happiness is short-lived, however, as his gangster twin brother Athreya attacks the family and kills Priya to get the watch. He only finds the key to the box where the watch was hidden. Unable to use the watch and fearful for his son's life, an injured Sethuraman manages to escape with his son and gets on a train, with Athreya in close pursuit. Sethuraman pleads with Sathyabhama, a woman he meets on the train, to take care of his son, and goes to face Athreya. He manages to trick Athreya into thinking he is carrying a bomb, prompting Athreya to quickly kill Sethuraman before jumping off the train to his apparent death. It is shown that Sethuraman placed the locked box containing his watch, along with Mani, who grew up unaware of its contents, and his true parents.

26 years later, in 2016, Manikandan is now a talented watch mechanic who believes Sathyabhama to be his mother. Mani meets a girl Sathya, who had come for her watch repair, and falls in love with her. Meanwhile, Athreya, who survived his fall and was in a coma, wakes up after 26 years (due to a fire in the hospital, in which the key to the box is dropped) and is shocked to find out that he is now paralysed from the waist down and older. He is cared for by his trusted confidante, Mithran.

In a chain of events, the key to the box ends up in Mani's hands. He opens the box and discovers the watch inside. He figures out its capabilities, including its ability to freeze time for 30 seconds, but questions the watch's origins and how it ended up in his possession.

Athreya, upset with the fact that he lost 26 years of his life and has become a paraplegic, obsesses over the watch and wishes to go back in time to relive his lost youth. Mithran issues an advertisement offering INR 5 crores (50 million) as a reward for the lost watch. This advertisement is discovered on a newspaper by Mani's friend Saravanan. Mani deduces that the ad creator is aware of the watch's powers. To find out the truth, Mani uses the original to make an identical copy and, along with Saravanan, goes to the provided address.

At the office, Athreya spots Mani's copy (his "watch" was the only one with the original back) and realises that Mani has the original watch. He summons both of them to the office and viciously attacks them, brutally killing Mani by chopping off his hand, and gets hold of the watch. An ecstatic Athreya reverses time, only to find out that the watch cannot transport its wearer beyond 24 hours, waking up at 12:00 A.M. the night before. He now realises that Mani is the only one who can upgrade the watch. Mani is then shown to be alive. Athreya decides to convince Mani that he is Sethuraman and pretends that he is dying from an incurable disease.

Now disguised as Sethuraman, Athreya finds Mani and tricks him into upgrading the watch to enable larger time jumps. Mani manages to upgrade the watch successfully but learns Athreya's true identity and the reason for his parents' deaths. He tricks Athreya into revealing the date of his parents' death and returns to 1990 to warn them. Unfortunately, right before he travels, Athreya manages to grab onto the watch, and they are both transported back: Athreya as a healthy adult about to storm Sethuraman's house, and Mani as a toddler who cannot speak. However, Sethuraman discovers the upgraded watch in Mani's crib. At first, he is excited that Mani time-traveled, but Priya asks why Mani would travel back to a time when he could not talk. Sethuraman quickly realizes, to his and Priya's horror, that Mani traveled back in time to warn them. With this realization, Sethuraman uses his watch to freeze time, kill Athreya, and escape his henchmen. Priya asks Sethu to throw the watch away as she has had enough of the past, and he complies.

Sethu and Priya board the same train as Sathyabhama, and they start a conversation in which Sethu tells Sathyabhama that he is a science teacher. Sathyabhama asks them to join her family's school, as they want to hire a science teacher. Sethu and Priya, making a fresh and happy start, agree.

In a mid-credits scene, a young Mani talks to a young Sathya.

== Cast ==
- Suriya in a triple role as
  - Manikandan "Mani", a watch mechanic, Sethuraman's biological son
  - Athreya, the main antagonist, Sethuraman's twin brother, Mani's paternal uncle
  - Dr. Sethuraman, a scientist, Athreya's twin brother, Mani's biological father
- Samantha Ruth Prabhu as Sathyabhama aka Sathya, Mani's love interest (voice dubbed by Chinmayi)
- Nithya Menen as Priya Sethuraman, Sethuraman's wife, Mani's biological mother
- Saranya Ponvannan as Sathyabhama, Mani's adoptive mother
- Ajay as Mithran, Athreya's trusted sidekick
- Girish Karnad as Sathyabhama and Raghu's father, Sathya's grandfather
- Mohan Raman as Raghu, Sathya's father
- Sudha as Sathya's mother
- Sathyan as Saravanan, Mani's friend
- Charle as Reddiyar
- Appukutty as Reddiyar's staff
- Harsha Vardhan as Kalai, an electrician who works for Athreya
- Natarajan Balkrishna as Sathya's uncle
- T. S. Ranganathan as Sathya's uncle
- Ramesh Kalyanaraman as Station Master
- Ganesan as Villager
- Mangala Radhakrishnan as Orphanage Warden
- Babu as Nair
- Naveen George Thomas

== Production ==
=== Pre-production ===
In August 2009, director Vikram Kumar announced that he was set to direct a film titled 24 The film was backed by producer Mohan Natarajan, which would feature actor Vikram in a lead role. Harris Jayaraj was confirmed to score the music and P. C. Sreeram to handle the film cinematography. In a December 2009 interview with trade analyst Sreedhar Pillai, director Vikram stated: "We have signed Ileana D'Cruz to do 24. It will be her re-launch in Tamil cinema. She has given us bulk dates from February 2010 for the second schedule of the film." In February 2010, Vikram Kumar officially announced that he had dropped the film. He clarified that he fine-tuned the film script but it was rejected by actor Vikram and the film producer. Further, the other reason cited was that the director had failed to provide the complete script even while production expenses were increasing. Due to difference of opinions, the director voluntarily walked out and stated that he had been making changes in the script and would approach a leading actor in future. Kumar held preliminary discussions with Mahesh Babu, who loved the script but was unsure about being able to play triple roles, eventually passing the offer on.

=== Development ===
"Many writers and directors have attempted a movie dealing with time travel. But this movie is about my perspective of this genre, and unlike what usually happens in such movies, I have kept the narrative very simple, so that anyone from the ages of six, right up to sixty can enjoy the movie, in which a gadget actually plays an important role."

— Vikram Kumar on his film, in an interview with The Times of India.

In August 2014, Suriya's production company 2D Entertainment announced the project through their official Twitter handle. In October 2014, A. R. Rahman was announced as the film soundtrack and score composer. Actor Suriya was confirmed as the male lead. In an interview with IndiaGlitz, Suriya pointed the core of the plot stating: "The one thing that humans cannot control is "time" but what if one has the power to do so. This is the core theme of the film 24."

=== Characters ===
Actor Suriya played three distinct roles, one of them being the antagonist. Five to six looks were designed for him. The producers had potential discussions with Catherine Tresa for the lead female role before Samantha Ruth Prabhu was finalised in February 2015. In July 2015, Nithya Menen was roped in to play the other leading character. The characters played by Samantha and Menon were described as being of contrasting nature though both play love interest opposite Suriya. Samantha plays the love interest opposite to the character "Mani" whereas Nithya Menen to the character "Sethuraman".

=== Filming ===
Principal photography commenced in Mumbai on 8 April 2015. A romantic song was filmed in Nashik by early June 2015. Certain scenes were filmed at Filmistaan studios in Goregaon. VFX works were also carried out in the same studio by September 2015. Nithya Menen began filming her portions in the city from 1 August 2015. The first schedule was completed by early September 2015. By mid of the same month, a twenty-day schedule began in Poland. The crew filmed action scenes and songs at Kraków, the Zborów Mountain in Kroczyce, Zakopane, Leba, Lewin Kłodzki, Jedlina-Zdrój, Wałbrzych, Bukowice and Nowe Brzesko–all in Poland. The lights were provided by Kraków Company Cinelight. The Kraków Film Commission and Kraków Film Cluster supported the project in Poland. On 26 October 2015, the team shot an important sequence in Subrata Roy Sahara Stadium in Pune. The shoot was completed in a single day. By the end of the same month, the last schedule of filming was done at Adithyaram Studios in Chennai. On 2 November 2015, the filming was completed. In all, the film was shot for over 100 days, out of which 30 days of work was done abroad. More than 60 percent of the film involves VFX.

== Music ==
The film score and soundtrack album are composed by A. R. Rahman. The lyrics to the songs are written by Vairamuthu and Madhan Karky. The soundtrack album was released by Eros Music on 9 April 2016, and its rights were bought later by Sony Music India.

== Release ==
The film was released on an estimated 1,950–2,000 screens worldwide. The screen count in United States was 267, with special premieres held on 5 May 2016. The states of Andhra Pradesh and Telangana shared 425 plus screens between them.

=== Marketing ===
A game titled 24: Athreya Run which was created by Creative Monkey Games was released through application distribution platforms iOS App Store and Google Playstore on 1 May 2016.

== Reception ==
=== Critical Response ===
24 received positive reviews from critics.

In his review for The Hindu, critic Baradwaj Rangan called 24 an "intelligent, joyous mix of sci-fi and masala-myth." Sreedhar Pillai in his review for Firstpost mentioned, "24 is a classy commercial entertainer, which has its moments." Malini Mannath of The New Indian Express wrote, "Attractively packaged, 24 is refreshing, novel and worth a watch." M. Suganth of The Times of India, assigned 4 out of 5 stars, stating: "It is not often that we see a big star choosing to take a risk with a script that is not simplistic or formulaic, especially when his last few films have underperformed at the box office, but here Suriya pulls it off admirably." For The Indian Express, Goutham VS wrote: "Suriya's 'Athreya' is a role to remember for years to come. Director Vikram Kumar needs to be applauded for handling such a complex multi-layered screenplay." He gave the film 3.5 stars out of 5. Critic based at India Today, Kirubhakar Purushothaman praised the director, calling him the hero of the film. He extended his review by assigning 3.5 stars (out of 5). In her review for Daily News and Analysis, Latha Srinivasan stated, "Actor Suriya gives a stellar performance in this tale of time travel! Vikram Kumar's '24' is a visually stunning film with a novel concept." She gave the film 3.5 stars out of 5.

A 3.5 star (out of 5) generalized review by Indo-Asian News Service mentioned that the "Suriya starrer is truly ambitious". In her review published by The Deccan Chronicle, Anupama Subramaniam called the film a "well executed and intelligently woven sci-fi thriller." She gave the film 3 stars out of 5. Subha Shetty Saha, in her review for Mid-Day stated, "24 is a fantastic attempt at sci-fi genre of filmmaking and also belies a lot of hard work and thought that have gone into this at the screenplay stage." She gave the film 3 stars out of 5. S Saraswathi of Rediff felt, "24 is a cleverly crafted entertainer that is worth your time and money." Gautaman Bhaskaran of the Hindustan Times gave the film 2.5 stars out of 5, claiming: "The Sathya-Mani romance is silly to the core, and drags the narrative down by several notches, though uniformly fine performances by Menen, Samantha and Suriya come as magic relief." Sify rated 3 out of 5 stars stating "Straight off the bat Vikram Kumar's Suriya sci-fi film 24 is a well executed thinking movie within the commercial format."

=== Overseas ===
J Hurtado of Twitch Film commented on the film, "24 is about as high concept as masala entertainers come, it never forgets its purpose is to thrill its audience and give them what they paid for. It is a breathless, inventive, romantic, action packed adventure that is packed to the gills with surprises and joy." Mythily Ramachandran, in her review for Gulf News concluded that the film was an entertaining ride and went on to say, "The time-travelling film wins with superb and often hilarious performances by its leading actors."

== Box office ==
=== India ===
By the end of its first weekend, the film had earned around ₹50 crore (US$5.2 million) in India, with a considerable part of the revenues coming from the Telugu version. At ₹17 crore (US$1.8 million), the collections from Telangana and Andhra Pradesh were equal to that from Tamil Nadu during the opening weekend.

=== Overseas ===
The film grossed over $1 million in three days on 161 screens in the United States. In the U. A. E. and Australia, the film earned $200,000 and AUD187,000 respectively during the same period. The film grossed $1.6 million in the United States in its lifetime.

== Future ==
The film's trailer, teaser and the first look posters featured Suriya as a paraglider. However, the paragliding sequences were removed by Prawin Pudi, the film editor due to time constraints. In an interview, the editor stated that paragliding is Mani's (character played by Suriya) hobby and was supposed to be featured as an introductory scene for Mani. Later, he stated that the deleted scene would be featured in the sequel of the film; planned as 24: Decoded.

In June 2020, Vikram Kumar claimed that he and Suriya had begun conceiving the sequel before the release of 24, and are currently writing the script for the sequel. Vikram Kumar previously announced his plans for a prequel, which would go into detail about how the relationship between Athreya and Sethuraman deteriorated. According to reports in July 2022, Vikram Kumar has prepared the storyline for the sequel and the film will focus on Athreya.

== Legal issues ==
The title 24 was in a legal tussle when actor Anil Kapoor planned action against the production house 2D Entertainment as the official look and logo of the film title seemed similar to the American TV series 24, for which Kapoor had bought the remake rights from 20th Century Fox International TV. Kapoor held the rights of the 192 episodes for a period of four years extendable to another ten years. His lawyers defended the case, stating that Kapoor holds one of the highest licensee deals for a fiction format. The case was settled in April 2015.

== Accolades ==
The film received two Awards at the 2017 Vikatan Awards – Best Visual Effects for Julian Trousselliar and Best Art Direction for Amit and Subrata. It won two awards – Best Cinematography and Best Production Design – at the 64th National Film Awards.

Award	Date of ceremony (Note: Date is linked to the article about the awards held that year, wherever possible.)	Category	Recipient(s)	Result	Ref.
Ananda Vikatan Cinema Awards	13 January 2017	Best Production Design	Subrata Chakraborthy; Amit Ray	Won	
Ananda Vikatan Cinema Awards	13 January 2017	Best Visual Effects	Julien Trousselier	Won	
Edison Awards	11 March 2017	Best Protagonist	Suriya	Won	
Edison Awards	11 March 2017	Best Antagonist	Suriya	Won	
Filmfare Awards South	17 June 2017	Best Cinematographer – South	Tirru	Won	
Filmfare Awards South	17 June 2017	Best Actor – Tamil	Suriya	Nominated	
Filmfare Awards South	17 June 2017	Critics Best Actor – Tamil	Suriya	Won	
Filmfare Awards South	17 June 2017	Best Actress – Tamil	Samantha Akkineni	Nominated	
Filmfare Awards South	17 June 2017	Best Supporting Actress – Tamil	Nithya Menen	Nominated	
Filmfare Awards South	17 June 2017	Best Music Director – Tamil	A. R. Rahman	Nominated	
Filmfare Awards South	17 June 2017	Best Lyricist – Tamil	Madhan Karky ("Naan Un")	Nominated	
Filmfare Awards South	17 June 2017	Best Male Playback Singer – Tamil	Sid Sriram ("Mei Nigara")	Nominated	
Filmfare Awards South	17 June 2017	Best Female Playback Singer – Tamil	Chinmayi ("Naan Un")	Nominated	
National Film Awards	3 May 2017	Best Cinematography	Tirru	Won	
National Film Awards	3 May 2017	Best Production Design	Subrata Chakraborthy; Shreyas Khedekar; Amit Ray	Won	
South Indian International Movie Awards	30 June – 1 July 2017	Best Actor – Tamil	Suriya	Nominated	
Tamil Nadu State Film Awards	13 February 2026	Best Lyricist	Madhan Karky ("Naan Un")	Won	
Tamil Nadu State Film Awards	13 February 2026	Best Stunt Coordinator	Anbariv	Won	
Tamil Nadu State Film Awards	13 February 2026	Best Choreographer	Dinesh	Won	
Tamil Nadu State Film Awards	13 February 2026	Best Audiographer	A. S. Laxmi Narayanan	Won	
Zee Cinema Awards	25 March 2017	South Sensation of the Year	Suriya	Won	
