= Rajesh (Telugu actor) =

Indian actor

- Born: 1958/1959
- Died: 1996
- Occupation: Actor
- Years active: 1983-1992
- Spouse: Nagamani
- Children: 4, including Aishwarya Rajesh and Manikandan Rajesh
- Relatives: Sri Lakshmi (sister)

Rajesh was an Indian actor who worked on Telugu films during the 1980s. He belongs to a Telugu family. He was known for his roles in Jandhyala's films. He was born and brought up in Madras into a Telugu family from Rajamahendravaram, East Godavari district, Andhra Pradesh.

== Early life and career ==
Rajesh met Jandhyala through S. Gopal Reddy and debuted in Nelavanka (1983) with S. P. Balasubrahmanyam dubbing for him. That same year, he worked with Jandhyala again in Rendu Jella Sita (1983) and Ananda Bhairavi (1983) opposite Malavika Sarkar, which garnered him recognition. His sister Sri Lakshmi co-starred him in both films.

He was an alcoholic and donated the money he received from films to charity. He acted in around forty films. He died at the age of 38 due to liver damage at 2 a.m.

Actress Aishwarya Rajesh is his daughter.

== Filmography ==
- All films are in Telugu, unless otherwise noted.

List of Rajesh film credits
Year	Title	Role	Notes
1983	Nelavanka	Saleem	
1983	Palletoori Monagadu	Ravi	
1983	Rendu Jella Sita	Mohan	
1983	Ananda Bhairavi	Anand Sharma	Simultaneously shot in Kannada
1983	Dharmaatmudu	Shanthi's husband	
1984	Tella Gulabeelu	Raja	
1984	Bobbili Brahmanna	Rambabu	
1984	Bharathamlo Sankharavam	Rajesh	
1985	Aggi Raju	Rajesh	
1985	Premisthe Emavutundi		
1985	Sri Katna Leelalu	Sivaram	
1985	Muddula Chellelu		
1985	Siksha	Krishna	
1985	Kutumba Bandham	Shekhar	
1985	Terror	Raja	
1986	Bhale Mithrulu	Police Inspector	
1986	Chadastapu Mogudu		
1986	Driver Babu	Ravi	
1986	Malle Moggalu	Sivudu	
1986	Seetharama Kalyanam	Hari	
1986	Apoorva Sahodarulu	Vigyana Prasad	
1987	Aatma Bandhuvulu	Rajesh	
1987	Bhanumathi Gari Mogudu		
1988	Nyayaniki Siksha	Sub-Inspector	
1988	Maa Inti Maharaju	Madhavayya's son	
1988	Tiragabadda Telugubidda	Phani	
1988	Aswaddhama	Veeru	
1988	Agni Keratalu	Nagendra's brother-in-law	
1989	Sahasame Naa Oopiri	Rapist	
1989	Aakhari Kshanam	Ramkumar	
1990	Alajadi	College bully	
1990	Magaadu	Bhargav	
1991	Pandirimancham	Rajesh	
1991	Anaswaram	Rajesh	Malayalam film
1992	Nani		
1992	Asadhyulu	Jagapathi	
