= Bekaraar =

- Film poster
- Directed by: V. B. Rajendra Prasad
- Written by: Rahi Masoom Reza (dialogues)
- Story by: Jandhyala
- Produced by: V. B. Rajendra Prasad
- Starring: Sanjay Dutt; Padmini Kolhapure; Mohnish Behl; Supriya Pathak
- Cinematography: P. S. Selvaraj
- Edited by: A. Sanjeevi
- Music by: Laxmikant–Pyarelal
- Production company: Jagapathi Art Pictures
- Release date: 19 August 1983
- Country: India
- Language: Hindi

Bekaraar (transl. Restless) is a 1983 Indian Hindi-language film directed by Rajendra Prasad V.B. The movie stars Sanjay Dutt, Padmini Kolhapure, Mohnish Bahl, Supriya Pathak in lead roles. The film was a remake of the Telugu language film "Naalugu Stambhaala Aata"

== Cast ==
- Sanjay Dutt as Shyam
- Padmini Kolhapure as Sundari Gupta
- Supriya Pathak as Nisha
- Mohnish Bahl as Pradeep
- Ashok Kumar as Pradeep's Father
- Om Shivpuri as Nisha's Father
- Chand Usmani as Laxmi

== Soundtrack ==
The music was composed by the duo Laxmikant–Pyarelal.

Song	Singer
"Tum Chale Aaye, Chalo Khair Hui, Tum Na Aate To"	Kishore Kumar, Asha Bhosle
"Maine Yeh Faisla Kar Liya Hai, Ke Main Tujhse"	Kishore Kumar, Asha Bhosle
"Bekaraar Bekaraar Bekaraar Kiya"	Amit Kumar, Shailendra Singh
"Door Door Kahin Majhi Pukara"	Mahendra Kapoor
"Gaadi Chhuk Chhuk Chalti Hai"	Asha Bhosle
"Siyapati Ramchandra Ki Jai"	Asha Bhosle
