= Ramesh Naidu =

- Born: Pasupuleti Ramesh Naidu; 25 November 1933; Kondapalli, Madras Presidency, British India (Now in Andhra Pradesh, India)
- Origin: Andhra Pradesh
- Died: 2 September 1988 (aged 54) Hyderabad, Andhra Pradesh, India (Now Telangana)
- Genres: Film score, World music
- Occupations: Film score composer, music director, singer
- Years active: 1957–1988

Pasupuleti Ramesh Naidu (1933–1987) was an Indian music composer, multi instrumentalist, and singer known for his works predominantly in Telugu cinema. He garnered the National Film Award for Best Music Direction for the film Meghasandesam in 1982. He won three Nandi Awards. He also worked for Bengali, Nepali, Kannada, and Oriya films.

He was associated primarily with directors like Dasari Narayana Rao, Vijaya Nirmala and Jandhyala. His major works include Sivaranjani (1978), Ananda Bhairavi (1983), Srivariki Premalekha (1984), and Swayamkrushi (1987).

== Early life ==
Ramesh Naidu was born in Kondapalli in Krishna District of Andhra Pradesh, India. At the age of fourteen, under the guidance of B. R. Chopra, Naidu got trained in music instrumentation and orchestration at the music company His Master's Voice. His debut film as a music director was for the Marathi film Bandval Pahija.

Ramesh Naidu was first introduced to Telugu cinema in Dampatyam (1957) by Krishnaveni. He moved to Bombay again and later to Calcutta. He married a Punjabi woman, and worked for about ten years for Bengali, Nepali and Oriya films before returning to Telugu films with the film Amma Mata in 1972.

== Awards ==
National Film Awards

- National Film Award for Best Music Direction – 1982 – Megha Sandesam

Nandi Awards

- Best Music Director - 1984 - Suvarna Sundari
- Best Music Director – 1982 – Megha Sandesam
- Best Male Playback Singer – 1977 – Chillarakottu Chittemma

== Filmography ==
Telugu

- Dampatyam (1957)
- Swayamprabha (1957)
- Manorama (1959)
- Amma Maata (1972)
- Tata Manavadu (1972)
- Devudu Chesina Manushulu (1973)
- Ganga Manga (1973)
- Jeevitam (1973)
- Meena (1973)
- Chandana (1974)
- Bantrotu Bharya (1974)
- Chaduvu Samskaram (1974)
- Devadasu (1974)
- Radhamma Pelli (1974)
- Devude Gelichaadu (1976)
- Thoorpu Padamara (1976)
- Sivaranjani (1978)
- Kalyani (1979)
- Mangala Toralanalu (1979)
- Sangham Chekkina Shilpalu (1979)
- Chillarakottu Chittemma (1979)
- Antuleni Vinta Katha (1979)
- Jayasudha (1980)
- Hema Hemeelu (1980)
- Pasupu Parani (1980)
- Suvarna Sundari (1981)
- Antam Kaadidi Aarambham (1981)
- Kotta Neeru (1981)
- Malle Pandiri (1981)
- Mudda Mandaram (1981)
- Prema Sankellu (1982)
- Meghasandesam (1983)
- Nelavanka (1983)
- Rendu Jella Sita (1983)
- Ananda Bhairavi (1983)
- Justice Chakravarti (1984)
- Srivaari Sobhanam (1984)
- Srivariki Premalekha (1984)
- Rao Gopal Rao (1984)
- Sangeeta Samrat (1984)
- Surya Chandrulu (1985)
- Mogudu Pellalu (1985)
- Malle Moggalu (1986)
- Aha Naa Pellanta (1987)
- Swayamkrushi (1987)

Tamil

- Mela Thalangal (1978)
- Pennukku Yar Kaval (1980)

Hindi

- Hamlet (1954)

Kannada

- Manasinathe Mangalya (1976)
- Dharma Daari Thappithu (1982)
- Muthinantha Aththige (1982)
- Ananda Bhairavi (1983)
- Ajnathavasa (1984)
