= Ananda Bhairavi (film) =

- Theatrical poster of Telugu version
- Directed by: Jandhyala
- Written by: Jandhyala (dialogues)
- Screenplay by: Jandhyala
- Story by: Kondamudi Sri Ramachandra Murthy
- Produced by: Aswani Karthika Chithra (Telugu); B. A. V. Sandilya (Telugu); Dwarakish (Kannada)
- Starring: Girish Karnad; Kanchana; Malavika Sarkar; Rajesh
- Cinematography: S. Gopal Reddy
- Edited by: Gautam Raju
- Music by: Ramesh Naidu
- Production company: Kalyani Art Films
- Release date: 25 August 1983
- Running time: 143 minutes
- Languages: Telugu; Kannada

Ananda Bhairavi is a 1983 Indian bilingual dance film, simultaneously shot in Telugu and Kannada languages, written, and directed by Jandhyala. It starred Girish Karnad, Kathak dancer Malavika Sarkar, Rajesh and "Natyacharya" Bhagavathula Venkata Rama Sarma as a male classical dancer in this film. The film was premiered at International Film Festival of India. The film received positive reviews and has garnered the four state Nandi Awards.

== Plot ==
This is a movie which gives you knowledge about the origin of Kuchipudi dance. It is about people who considered a girl performing "Kuchipudi" dance an embarrassment and about a man who is fighting tooth and nail to pass on the heritage of "Kuchipudi". He finally manages to find a girl who he trains in "Kuchipudi". As girls learning Kuchipudi were not accepted in that era, he gets outcast from his caste, place and also the religious places.

== Cast ==
- Girish Karnad (S. P. Balasubrahmanyam as the Telugu dubbed voice)
- Kanchana
- Malavika Sarkar
- Rajesh as Anand Sharma
- Bhagavathula Venkata Rama Sarma
- Suthi Velu
- Suthi Veerabhadra Rao
- J. V. Ramana Murthy
- Mukku Raju
- Hema Sundar
- Sri Lakshmi
- Master Hari
- Mahalakshmi
- Puccha Purnanandam as Grand father

== Soundtrack ==
Telugu:

- "Brahmanjali" - S. P. Balasubrahmanyam
- "Pilichina Muraliki" - S. P. Balasubrahmanyam, S. Janaki
- "Koluvaitiva Ranga Saayi" - S. P. Balasubrahmanyam, S. Janaki
- "Chaitramu Kusumaanjali" - S. P. Balasubrahmanyam
- "Ra Ragamai" - S. P. Balasubrahmanyam

Kannada:

- "Brahmanjali" - S. P. Balasubrahmanyam
- "Haaduva Muraliya" - S. P. Balasubrahmanyam, Vani Jairam
- "Malagiruveya Ranganatha" - S. P. Balasubrahmanyam, S. Janaki
- "Chaitrada Kusumaanjali" - S. P. Balasubrahmanyam
- "Baa Baa Ba Raagavagi" - S. P. Balasubrahmanyam

== Awards ==
Nandi Awards - 1983

- Best Feature Film - Gold - Bhupal Reddy & Seetha Padmaraju (1983)
- Best Director - Jandhyala
- Second Best Story Writer - K. S. Chandra Murthy
- Best Cinematographer - S. Gopal Reddy

Filmfare Awards South

- Filmfare Award for Best Actor - Kannada - Girish Karnad
