= Rendu Jella Sita =

- Theatrical release poster
- Directed by: Jandhyala
- Written by: Jandhyala
- Produced by: K. Kesava Rao
- Starring: Naresh; Mahalakshmi; Pradeep Kondiparthi
- Cinematography: S. Gopal Reddy
- Edited by: Gautam Raju
- Music by: Ramesh Naidu
- Release date: 31 March 1983
- Country: India
- Language: Telugu

Rendu Jella Sita is a 1983 Indian Telugu comedy film, written and directed by Jandhyala. The film stars Naresh, Rajesh, Pradeep Kondiparthi, Subhakar and Mahalakshmi in the lead roles, while Allu Ramalingaiah appears in a prominent role.

== Plot ==
Four men, Gopi (Naresh), Mohan (Rajesh), Krishna (Pradeep Kondiparthi) and Murthy (Subhakar) fall for Seetha (Mahalakshmi), and try to impress her. One day they all go to Seetha and ask her whom she loves among the four. Seetha replies that it is Madhu (Kamalakar). They all are shocked.

Then Seetha narrates the flashback, where Seetha is travelling in a bus. Madhu stands beside her and when he tries to give money to the conductor his coin slips into Seetha's blouse. The conductor asks for change, but he has no change, the conductor asks him to get down. Madhu pleads that he has an exam. Seetha gets a ticket for him too. Seetha teaches music for Madhu's friend's sisters and some girls. There he proposes to her by showing a classical song in a music book. She responds with the same feeling by showing another song. Madhu conveys the matter to Seetha's parents and they feel happy for their child. Madhu asks his father Gandabherundam (Allu Ramalingaiah), who doesn't like the match, but pretends to agree upon pressure from Madhu.

Seetha's father goes to meet Gandabherundam to ask when the marriage will be there; Gandabherundam falsely says that he promised lord Venkatesa that the money he receives as dowry for his son's marriage will be given to God. So Seetha's father agrees as it is a sentimental thing. He works hard, makes all the arrangements and at the last moment, one man comes and says that they don't want this marriage and returns money also. Seetha's father goes to Gandabherundam and asks the reason, and they say that Seetha has an affair with someone else. Seetha's family moves from there. The flashback ends.

Now, these four go to the village and enquire about the matter. They want to teach Gandabherundam a lesson. They provoke Kameswara Rao (Subhalekha Sudhakar) to love Gandabherundam's daughter. Meanwhile, they will get to know that the reason for rejecting Seetha was photographs showing Seetha with friend of Madhu, who has feelings for Seetha and for whose sisters Seetha taught music classes. Gandabherundam, along with this person makes fake photos and destroys Madhu's feelings. On the marriage of Gandabherundam's daughter with Kameswara Rao, these four stop the marriage and show photographs of Madhu's sister with the same person with Seetha in the photograph. Madhu objects to it then brings the person; he says that they love each other. Then they make Madhu understand that his father gave money to make all these things. They say that at the time, Seetha has no brother to ask like you, now she has four brothers. Madhu realises the mistake and two marriages takes place.

== Cast ==
- Naresh as Gopi
- Rajesh as Mohan
- Pradeep Kondiparthi as Krishna
- Subhakar as Murthy
- Mahalakshmi as Seetha
- Allu Ramalingaiah as Gandabherundam
- Kamalakar as Madhu
- Subhalekha Sudhakar as Kameswara Rao
- Sakshi Ranga Rao as Suryanarayana
- Suttivelu as Subbarao
- Srilakshmi as Anasooya
- Suthi Veerabhadra Rao as Retd. Major Mangapathi
- Potti Prasad as 'Jyothisharatna' A. V. Rao
- Rallapalli as Appalakonda

== Production ==
=== Development ===
Jandhyala had good relations with make-up man, producer Jayakrishna, from early in his career. When Jandhyala turned to a director from his screen-writing and dialogue-writing career, Jayakrishna used to visit his shooting regularly. Once Jandhyala narrated this story-line to Jayakrishna. When Keshavarao (then film distributor) asked to help him to find a better script and assist him in his trials to produce movies, Jayakrishna recommended him doing a movie with Jandhyala. After their initial discussions about the script and budget matters, the movie started eventually.

=== Casting ===
The script demands four young actors as heroes. Jandhyala selected Pradeep for one of the four roles, to whom Jandhyala continued offering roles in every one of the films directed by him till then, from his directional debut Mudda Mandaram. After this film, Pradeep ended his career as a film actor and later he has done many roles in television serials. For the other three roles, Jandhyala selected Naresh, Rajesh and Subhakar. Subhakar later became famous by his role in Mayuri. Rajesh, who made his debut as the hero in Jandhyala's directorial movie Nelavanka, and is brother of popular comedy actress Sri Lakshmi, has been selected to do another hero character.

Jandhyala conducted selections for the title role as Seetha. Vijayashanti, Bhanupriya, Shobhana and many others had been rejected for the role and he selected Mahalakshmi, daughter of former actress Pushpalatha, for the title role. Pushpalatha also played a role in this film as the mother of Seetha. Movie organizer Jayakrishna offered Sri Lakshmi, who later become a popular comedy actress in Telugu industry, a guest role in this movie. Her brother Rajesh suggested that she turn down the offer because he thought doing a cameo role while she has done heroine characters was not a good idea. Despite her brother's suggestions, she accepted the offer. Eventually the guest role became a complete comedy role, whose success paved way to her successful career as a comedy actress in Telugu movies.

=== Filming ===
Filming started on 4 October 1982 in Kanaka Mahalakshmi temple, Visakhapatnam. Most of the shooting occurred in Visakhapatnam, Araku Valley, Vijayanagaram and other places around Visakhapatnam city. The film unit hired a building opposite Ramakrishna beach, Visakhapatnam and shot it as the residence of the heroes.
Filming completed in 45 days and Rs.13,75,000 was spent on the movie.
