= Jamba Lakidi Pamba (1992 film) =

- DVD cover
- Directed by: E. V. V. Satyanarayana
- Written by: E. V. V. Satyanarayana
- Dialogue by: D. Diwakar Babu
- Produced by: J. Bhagavan; D. V. V. Danayya; Saraswathi Kumar
- Starring: Naresh; Aamani
- Cinematography: V. Srinivasa Reddy
- Edited by: K. Ravindra Babu
- Music by: Raj–Koti
- Distributed by: Sri Balaji Creations
- Release date: 1992
- Country: India
- Language: Telugu
- Budget: ₹50 lakh
- Box office: est. ₹2 crore

Jamba Lakidi Pamba is a 1992 Indian Telugu-language fantasy comedy film written and directed by E. V. V. Satyanarayana. The film stars Naresh and Aamani (in her Telugu film debut). The film explores feminism and women's rights in a light-hearted manner and depicts the consequences when the male and female gender roles are reversed. The film is based on an old story EVV conceptualized while working under Jandhyala as an assistant director. It is also inspired by a play written by Madireddy Sulochana. EVV took the basic theme of Sulochana's play and his old story and developed it into the script of Jamba Lakidi Pamba.

The film was initially released in 1992 but went unnoticed. It was re-released on 12 July 1993 and became a commercial success. The film was remade in Kannada as Nari Munidare Gandu Parari (2004). The 2018 film of the same name is also based on the concept of Jamba Lakidi Pamba. Yashraj Films made a program series named Man's world on YouTube, which is inspired from the film.

== Plot ==
In Vizag, Ramalakshmi is deeply disturbed by the problems faced by all the women in their colony while their husbands happily enjoy playing cards and dominating their wives. Whenever she is furious about the plight of women, she receives a mysterious letter that appears from nowhere and on each of these occasions she has torn up the letters in distress without reading them.

On one such occasion, she reads the letter fully. In that letter, an anonymous asks her to come to an isolated place in the Borra caves if she wants to solve the problems faced by women. She reaches that place and finds Amba, a yogin who lost all her relatives because of the male-dominated society. To take revenge on society, she did penance for many years and prepared a herb called Jamba Lakidi Pamba. Her disciple Chidambarananda Swami hands over the herb to Ramalakshmi, asking her to mix that in the drinking water supply to see its effect.

The next morning, an I.G. of the police along with a few other officers who visited Vizag start behaving weirdly. The government suspects that something mysterious has happened in Vizag and quarantines the city. Vijay, a police officer, is sent there to investigate the reason. He visits Vizag and finds that all men are behaving like women and vice versa. At the same time, Thutala Rani, a bandit who wants to exploit the situation in Vizag and moves there along with her followers.

Vijay meets Ramalakshmi at the beach and she is surprised that he is still behaving like a man. He finds that Ramalakshmi hates male domination. She asks Vijay whether he drank water on the 24th, much to his suspicion. Then he goes to a police station and finds Nagulu, an S.I. who is also behaving normally. He explains that after he had gone out of Vizag on 23rd and returned on 25th, everything in Vizag got changed. Vijay concludes that something happened on the 24th which is the root cause of this situation, and Ramalakshmi might be one of the persons behind it.

Ramalakshmi finds that Vijay is a police officer who came there for investigation. She plans to make him drink water mixed with the herb but she is tricked by Vijay who behaves like a woman and marries her. On their first night, Vijay reveals that he is normal and asks her to reveal the secret behind the strange behavior of the people in the city. In a scuffle between them, she has pushed away and accidentally goes into a coma. Before she gains her conscience, Vijay and Nagulu enact a drama to trick her into believing that she has gone into the future (the year 2092) and make her reveal the secret about Jamba Lakidi Pamba.

Vijay and Nagulu set out to meet Amba and find only her disciple Chidambarananda there. He tells them that she died and he was the one who gave the herb to Ramalakshmi. He also reveals that he found the antidote of Jamba Lakidi Pamba called Pamba Lakidi Jamba and mixed them together as he did not want to betray his kind. However, he realizes that was a mistake, and people who consumed it would become mad in five stages. Chidambarananda has a final antidote called Pamba Jamba Lamba Lakidi but before they take it from him, he is kidnapped by Thutala Rani with the help of Ramalakshmi. When they try to trace him, they find that people have reached the second stage in which kids behave like adults and vice versa. When Vijay explains all this to Ramalakshmi, she realizes her mistake and helps Vijay to find out the antidote. While they try to trace Thutala Rani, the third phase also arrives where the dressing style and the voices of all the people are changed. When all the people become mad, they chase them to the den of Thutala Rani, where they find Chidambarananda and make him prepare the antidote. They fight with Thutala Rani and finally mix it in the water and spray them on all the people and everything becomes normal.

== Cast ==
- Naresh as Vijay
- Aamani as Ramalakshmi
- Brahmanandam as Anandam, Vijay’s brother
- Jayaprakash Reddy as Keeravani
- Kota Srinivasa Rao as Ramalakshmi’s father
- Babu Mohan as Nagulu, Sub Inspector of Police
- Mallikarjuna Rao as Mallikarjuna Rao
- Maharshi Raghava
- Ironleg Sastri as Panthulu
- Ali as Ramalakshmi’s brother
- Dubbing Janaki as Ramalakshmi’s mother
- Jayalalitha as Thutala Rani, bandit
- Kallu Chidambaram as Chidambarananda Swamy
- Sri Lakshmi as Paru, the drunkard
- Kalpana Rai as Panthulu's wife
- Aditya as School Headmaster
- Chidathala Apparao as Paru's assistant Bose D.K.
- Tirupathi Prakash
- Viswanatham
- Lakshmi Kantham
- Subhash
- Krishna Chaitanya
- Shilpa

== Production ==
=== Development ===
EVV conceptualized the story of men becoming women and vice versa while working under Jandhyala as an assistant director. He initially the story sent to Andhra Jyothi for publication but the newspaper rejected it. The film was also inspired by a play written by Madireddy Sulochana. EVV took the basic theme of Sulochana's play and his old story and developed it into the story of Jamba Lakidi Pamba. Diwakar Babu helped in the development of the story.

D. V. V. Danayya, who liked the script agreed to produce the film. Initially titled as Reverse Gear, the film was later renamed to Jamba Lakidi Pamba as the makers felt that the former might be taken in a negative way.

=== Casting ===
EVV wrote the script envisioning Rajendra Prasad in the lead role. However owing to Prasad's busy schedule, EVV approached Naresh. He liked script and signed immediately. Several actresses where approached for lead role but Tamil actress Meenakshi was finalised. She adopted the screen name Aamani and made her debut in Telugu cinema.

=== Principal photography ===
The film was entirely shot in Visakhapatnam in the span of a month.

== Release ==
The film was initially released in 1993 but went unnoticed running only for a day in theatres. Following the success of EVV-directed Varasudu, it was re-released on 12 July 1993 and became a commercial success.

== Soundtrack ==
The soundtrack was composed by Raj–Koti and all lyrics were written by Bhuvana Chandra.

Track list
No.	Title	Singer(s)	Length
1.	"Kanaraa Vinaraa"	Malgudi Subha	5:20
2.	"Madanaa Thagunaa"	S. P. Balasubrahmanyam, K. S. Chithra	4:36
3.	"Nene Superman"	S. P. Balasubrahmanyam, Chorus	4:45
4.	"Niluvara Valukanula Vaada"	Mano, S. P. Sailaja, Radhika	10:10
5.	"Yamma Yamma"	S. P. Balasubrahmanyam, K. S. Chithra	4:49
Total length:			29:42
