= Nalugu Stambhalata (film) =

- Theatrical poster
- Directed by: Jandhyala
- Written by: Jandhyala
- Produced by: N. Krishnam Raju
- Starring: Naresh; Poornima; Pradeep Kondiparthi; Tulasi
- Cinematography: S. Gopal Reddy
- Edited by: G. G. Krishna Rao; Gautam Raju
- Music by: Rajan–Nagendra
- Release date: 15 May 1982
- Running time: 140 minutes
- Country: India
- Language: Telugu

Nalugu Stambhalata (transl. A game of four pillars) is a 1982 Telugu-language romantic drama film written and directed by Jandhyala and produced by N. Krishnam Raju under the Navata Arts banner. The film features Naresh, Poornima, Pradeep Kondiparthi, and Tulasi in lead roles. The music was composed by Rajan–Nagendra.

The film was a commercial success, running for over 175 days in three centres. The film introduced Naresh who went on to establish a successful career in Telugu cinema. The comedic duo of Sutti Velu and Sutti Veerabhadra Rao became widely popular due to their roles in the film, leading to future collaborations. V. B. Rajendra Prasad remade the film in Hindi as Bekaraar in 1983.

== Plot ==
The story revolves around classmates Naresh and Pradeep. Naresh is in love with Sarada, but circumstances force him to marry Kamala. Meanwhile, Sarada becomes pregnant, and Pradeep marries her to save her honour. Naresh, unable to forget Sarada, struggles to accept his life with Kamala. The film explores the complexities of relationships and the challenges faced by these characters as they navigate love, family obligations, sacrifice, and societal expectations.

== Cast ==
- Naresh as Naresh (Voice Dubbed By S. P. Balasubrahmanyam)
- Poornima as Sarada
- Pradeep Kondiparthi as Pradeep Kumar
- Tulasi as Kamala
- Rohini as Gayatri
- Suthivelu as Gurnadham
- Suthi Veerabhadra Rao as Veerabhadram
- Vijji Babu
- Shankar
- Janaki
- Kakinada Syamala
- Annapurna
- Sundaralakshmi
- Balaji
- Krishna Chaitanya
- Vallam Narasimha Rao
- Master Ali

== Production ==
Nalugu Stambhalata was produced by N. Krishnam Raju under the Navata Arts banner, which was a respected production house at the time. The film's title, which translates to "Four Pillars," symbolizes the four central characters who are crucial to the narrative.

Initially, Suresh was considered for the role later played by Naresh, but Naresh was cast after scheduling conflicts arose with Suresh. Naresh, the son of actress Vijaya Nirmala, made his official debut with this film, despite his earlier appearance in Prema Sankellu (1982). He was chosen after Jandhyala noticed him in a dance class. Pradeep Kumar, fresh from the success of Mudda Mandaram (1981), was cast as Pradeep. Poornima and Tulasi were selected as the female leads, while Sutti Velu and Sutti Veerabhadra Rao, collectively known as "Sutti Janta," provided comic relief. Due to Naresh’s Tamil-accented Telugu, his voice was dubbed by S. P. Balasubrahmanyam to enhance the film’s overall quality.

The director's team included several notable young talents. Sastry, who later directed popular television shows such as Padutha Theeyaga and Paadalani Undi, and E. V. V. Satyanarayana, who became a prominent Telugu director, were part of the team. Satyanarayana was selected to assist by producer Navata Krishnam Raju and this film marked his first collaboration with Jandhyala, leading to his continued work with him until he became an independent director with Chevilo Puvvu (1990). The camera crew, led by S. Gopal Reddy, included M. V. Raghu, Divakar, and Srinivas Reddy, all of whom later achieved success in cinematography.

The film was shot primarily in Visakhapatnam, Araku, and Ramachandrapuram. The crew, including the cast, stayed together at MVP Colony in Visakhapatnam during the 60-day shoot. Cinematographer S. Gopal Reddy captured the scenic beauty of Araku, especially in the song sequences "Chinukula Rali" and "Raagamo Anuraagamo."

== Music ==
The music for the film was composed by the duo Rajan–Nagendra with lyrics by Veturi Sundararama Murthy. The song "Chinukula Rali" was reused from music director's own composition "Kanasalu Neene Manasalu Neene" from the 1976 Kannada film Bayalu Daari. The soundtrack was well-received, with songs like "Raagamo Anuraagamo" and "Chinukula Rali" becoming popular hits. The playback singers included S.P. Balasubrahmanyam, P. Susheela, and S. Janaki.

Song	Singer(s)	Lyrics
"Chinukula Rali"	S. P. Balasubrahmanyam, P. Susheela	Veturi
"Doralaneeku"	P.Susheela	Veturi
"Kaliki Chilukara"	S.P. Balasubrahmanyam	Veturi
"Kobbaraku Gali"	S.P. Balasubrahmanyam	Veturi
"Ragamo Anuragamo"	S.P. Balasubrahmanyam, S. Janaki	Veturi

== Reception ==
Nalugu Stambhalata was a critical and commercial success. The film ran for over 100 days in eight to ten centres and for 175 days in three centres, including Devi 70mm theatre in Hyderabad. The film particularly resonated with audiences in Telangana, where it ran for an extended period. The film's success further cemented Jandhyala's reputation as a director and introduced Naresh and Pradeep to wider audiences.

The film's dialogues, especially those of Sutti Velu and Sutti Veerabhadra Rao, were released as an audio cassette by AVM Audio.

== Legacy ==
The film is remembered for its strong performances, memorable music, and the debut of Naresh, who went on to become a prominent actor in Telugu cinema. The comedic duo of Sutti Velu and Sutti Veerabhadra Rao became widely popular due to their roles in the film, leading to more collaborations in the future.

The film was later remade in Hindi as Bekaraar (1983) by producer V. B. Rajendra Prasad, starring Sanjay Dutt, Mohish Behl, and Padmini Kolhapure.
