= Srivariki Premalekha =

- Theatrical release poster
- Directed by: Jandhyala
- Written by: Potturi Vijayalakshmi (story); Jandhyala (dialogues and screenplay)
- Produced by: Cherukuri Ramoji Rao
- Starring: Naresh; Poornima; Suthi Veerabhadra Rao; Srilakshmi; Mucherla Aruna
- Cinematography: S. Gopal Reddy
- Edited by: Goutam Raju
- Music by: Pasupuleti Ramesh Naidu
- Production company: Ushakiran Movies
- Release date: 24 February 1984
- Country: India
- Language: Telugu

Srivariki Premalekha (transl. A Love Letter to the Husband) is a 1984 Telugu-language romantic comedy film written, and directed by Jandhyala; and produced by Cherukuri Ramoji Rao. The story is based on a Potturi Vijayalakshmi novel titled Premalekha, published in "Chatura" magazine.

The film was a commercial hit during that period, with many of its case members subsequently becoming established in the cinema field. The film won a Filmfare Award South and a Nandi Award. It was remade in Tamil as Porutham with Naresh and Poornima reprising their roles.

== Plot ==
This story revolves around a blind Love letter written by Swarna to Ananda Rao.

Swarna a mischievous and jovial girl in a bet with her friends, she writes a blind love letter to an unknown person if the reply will come early from that boy, it will proves Swarna's theory that a boy can be easily wooed by a girl. While posting the letter she forgot to mention the from address then unknowingly her friend randomly chooses a name called Sony from a 'Sony' TV advertisement in a newspaper instead of Swarna's name in the letter and she randomly chooses a name called Ananda Rao from her brother's friends' names and sent the address to Hindustan Shipping Board after getting address from the same newspaper in another advertisement. Then first this letter reaches to O. Ananda Rao, a victim of his doubting wife, who works in Hindustan Shipping Board after reading the letter, first he felt excited later feared of his wife and he thoughts that the letter belonged to his former colleague Ananda Rao, who is a young bachelor now transferred to Hindustan Shipping Yard, Visakhapatnam.

The destiny turns out Ananda Rao, an innocent young bachelor. After reading the love letter, he pledges to marry the girl who wrote the letter. The from address is missing is at the beginning itself he tries in various ways to find her with the help of his Maternal Uncle Suryam at first he thought she was from his office later from his area and arranges a grand party by announcing he is going for a traditional date on thinking that this announcement makes reveals herself to him, but that became an utter failure by no girl turned up to him and he paid the huge bill this also leads to becoming a joke in his backyard.

His father, Parandhamayya, is highly abusive and openly scolds him. He needs to get him married soon, so he arranges a match to him. Then, Wantedly Anand Rao makes his matchmaking disastrous. Later His office colleague Margaret tries to exploit his innocence and introduces Sony as that girl.

Meanwhile, after losing the bet and it was proved that her theory was wrong, she came to Vizag for a vacation in her sister's house. Coincidentally, Ananda Rao became her neighbor, and they became good friends, but Swarna had started to have feelings for Anand Rao. After that, she decides to propose to him for the marriage, but before that, he expresses his feelings to Sony, and he says he was trying to convince his parents. Feeling dejected, Swarna went back to her village and accepted the marriage proposal on the condition that her parents had given no dowry.

Anandrao's elder brother Bhaskaram meets Sony and suspects her identity. Then he finds out the truth as a beggar. Later, he escapes from the beggars' association members who thought a new beggar came into their territory without any permission of their association.

Then, after knowing all the facts, Bhaskaram reveals the truth in front of Ananda Rao. Actually Sony's real name is Rita, she loves a boy called Robert and her sister Margaret doesn't like their relationship, then when Robert has been shifted to Delhi because of his father's job transfer, then she lies her that he died in an accident and she secretly received his letters to her sister for communication and stopped their communication.

Felt shattered, Sony decided to move on. After that, Margaret encourages her to love Ananda Rao. When Bhaskaram came to her house as a beggar, Robert came back home after not receiving any response from Rita. The argument goes on with Rita and her sister. After hearing this story, Ananda Rao goes to meet her and sees her with Robert, and Rita apologizes for her acts to Ananda Rao. Feeling dejected and convinced by their brother's words, he decides to marry, which his father has arranged unknown to him and the real reason for the Bhaskaram's arrival.

Here, the bride is none other than Swarna. Meanwhile, Swarna decides to commit suicide because of love failure, and she consumes a diamond ring that her father had given to her for marriage. Then she saw Ananda Rao as a bridegroom and misunderstands him as a fraud and angrily conveyed it to him. Then Anand Rao confesses his story to her and decides to call off the marriage. Then she tells him her story and reveals that she was Sony and shows the proof of the remaining from the address of the letter. Which she had kept safe. Then she tells him that she consumed the diamond ring to commit suicide because she had feelings on Anand Rao.

The tension arose, and then Swarna's father says coolly that it's not a diamond ring. It's an ordinary stone shaped as a diamond, he want to manage with those stones to the bridegrooms family. After a lot of chaos, Anand Rao and Swarna finally marry and live happily ever after.

== Cast ==
- Naresh as Ananda Rao
- Poornima as Swarna
- Suthi Veerabhadra Rao as Parandhamayya
- Nutan Prasad as Bhaskaram
- Vidyasagar as Suryam
- Sangeetha as Kamakshi
- Sri Lakshmi as Poorna
- Dubbing Janaki as Parandhamayya's wife [Ananda Rao's mother]
- S. K. Misro as Bhimudu (Parandhamayya'a gumastha)
- Melkote as Ananda Rao's Boss
- Jit Mohan Mitra as Hanumaanlu
- Mucherla Aruna as Sony/Rita
- Potti Prasad as Harmonium
- Rallapalli as Sarangaramudu "Saraa"
- Suthivelu as Ananda Rao (cameo appearance)
- Viswanatham as Marichembu
- Subbaraya Sharma as Purohitudu
- P. L. Narayana
- B. Chakravarthy (Jr ANR)
- Pavala Syamala
- Gundu Hanumantha Rao

== Soundtrack ==
- "Lipileni Kanti Baasa" (Lyrics: Veturi; Singers: S. P. Balasubrahmanyam and S. Janaki)
- "Manasa Thullipadake" (Lyrics: Veturi; Singer: S. Janaki)
- "Pelladu Pelladu" (Lyrics: Veturi; Singers: S. P. Balasubrahmanyam and S. P. Sailaja)
- "Raghuvamsa Sudha" (Lyrics: Veturi; Singers: S. P. Sailaja and S. P. Balasubrahmanyam)
- "Sarigamapadani" (Lyrics: Veturi; Singer: S. P. Balasubrahmanyam)
- "Tholisaari Mimmalni" (Lyrics: Veturi; Singer: S. Janaki)

== Awards ==
- Filmfare Award for Best Director – Telugu: Jandhyala
- Nandi Award for Best Editor: Gautam Raju
