= Aadi Dampatulu =

1986 film directed by Dasari Narayana Rao

- Theatrical release poster
- Directed by: Dasari Narayana Rao
- Screenplay by: Dasari Narayana Rao
- Story by: Keshav Rathod; Bhishetty Lakshmana Rao
- Based on: Ghar Dwaar (1985)
- Produced by: Nitin D. Kapoor
- Starring: Akkineni Nageswara Rao; Jayasudha
- Cinematography: B. Krishnam Raju
- Edited by: P. S. Selvaraj
- Music by: Satyam
- Production company: JSK Combines
- Release date: 20 June 1986
- Running time: 147 Mins
- Country: India
- Language: Telugu

Aadi Dampatulu (transl. Beginning Couple) is a 1986 Telugu-language drama film produced by Nitin D. Kapoor under the JSK Combines banner and directed by Dasari Narayana Rao. It stars Akkineni Nageswara Rao and Jayasudha with music composed by Satyam. The film is a remake of the 1985 Hindi film Ghar Dwaar.

== Cast ==
- Akkineni Nageswara Rao—Shankar Rao
- Jayasudha—Parvathi
- Dasari Narayana Rao—Collector D. N. Rao
- Chandra Mohan—Mohan
- Naresh—Sagar
- Gollapudi Maruthi Rao—Dharma Rao
- Suthi Velu
- Nagesh
- Sarathi
- C.H. Krishnamurthy
- Tilak—Bujji
- Tulasi—Uma
- Poornima—Kamala
- Raja Sulochana—Sulochana Devi
- Jaya Malini—item number
- Master Harish—young Shankar Rao

== Soundtrack ==
The soundtrack was composed by Satyam. It was released through the SEA Records music label.

Track listing
No.	Title	Lyrics	Singer(s)	Length
1.	"Kadalinigani Vadivadiganu"	Sirivennela Seetharama Sastry	K. J. Yesudas, P. Susheela
2.	"Saagincharaa Maavaa"	Appalacharya	Madhavapeddi Ramesh, Manjula	4:01
3.	"Satya Harischandra"	Gurram Jashuva, Kondaveeti Venkatakavi, Dasari Narayana Rao	S. P. Balasubrahmanyam, P. Susheela, Jayasudha	9:58
4.	"Ennaallu Inkennellu"	Sirivennela Seetharama Sastry	S. P. Balasubrahmanyam	4:47
5.	"Chelli Anu Pilupu"	Dasari Narayana Rao	S. P. Balasubrahmanyam, P. Susheela, G. Anand	4:25
6.	"Egiregiri Vasthondi"	Dasari Narayana Rao	S. P. Balasubrahmanyam, Vani Jayaram	4:35
Total length:				40:02
