= Tulasi (actress) =

Indian actress (born 1967)

- Born: 20 June 1967 (age 59); Chennai, Tamil Nadu, India
- Occupation: Actress
- Years active: 1967-present

P. A. Tulasi (born 20 June 1967) is an Indian actress who primarily works in Telugu, Kannada, and Tamil cinema. Later she appeared in lead actress and supporting actress roles. She has acted in over 300 films in Telugu, Kannada, Tamil, Malayalam, and Bhojpuri languages. She won two Nandi Awards and one Filmfare Award.

== Career ==
Tulasi made her debut in the Telugu language when she was three months old in 1967. For a song in a film, a baby was needed and Tulasi was placed in the cradle after actress Savitri had requested Tulasi's mother, who was a friend of her. She was featured in a song when she was 3 1/2 years old in Jeevanatarangalu and said that she became a full-fledged actor when she was four.

She got married at age 28 to Kannada director Sivamani. She stated, "I met him in the morning and by evening we tied the knot". They have one son, Sai Tarun. Tulasi decided to quit acting after getting married, working only occasionally as a voice actor in Telugu films, including ones by Mani Ratnam. When her son was around six years old, she received several mother character roles. She initially declined them all, but finally signed on one Kannada film, Excuse Me, in which she played mother to Ramya and which became a big hit. After that she was doing three films a year in Kannada.

She began to act mainly in mother roles in Telugu and Tamil film industries. Her notable supporting roles include performances in Sasirekha Parinayam, Mr. Perfect, Darling, Srimanthudu, Iddarammayilatho, Nenu Local, Mahanati & Dear Comrade in Telugu and Pillaiyar Theru Kadaisi Veedu, Easan, Mankatha, Sundarapandian, Aadhalal Kadhal Seiveer and Pandiya Naadu in Tamil. Tulasi has said that Aadhalal Kadhal Seiveer, in which she had played mother to Manisha Yadav's character, changed her life and brought her an "identity as a screen mother". Her portrayal of Chellamma in Pannaiyarum Padminiyum was praised too, with critics stating that she was "brilliant", and had given her "career best performance".

== Partial filmography ==
| Year | Title | Role | Language | Notes |
|---|---|---|---|---|
| 1967 | Bharya | | Telugu | |
| 1973 | Arangetram | | Tamil | |
| 1977 | Chillarakottu Chittamma | | Telugu | |
| 1978 | Seetamalakshmi | | Telugu | |
| 1979 | Sankarabharanam | Sankaram | Telugu | |
| 1979 | Kothala Raayudu | Paapa | Telugu | |
| 1980 | Prema Tarangalu | | Telugu | |
| 1981 | Nyayam Kavali | Padma | Telugu | |
| 1981 | Mudda Mandaram | | Telugu | |
| 1981 | Rama Dhandu | | Telugu | |
| 1982 | Iddaru Kodukulu | Padma | Telugu | |
| 1982 | Bhakthadruva Markhandeya | | Telugu | |
| 1982 | Jagannatha Rathachakralu | Lakshmi | Telugu | |
| 1982 | Sakalakala Vallavan | | Tamil | |
| 1982 | Trisulam | | Telugu | |
| 1982 | Nalugu Stambhalata | | Telugu | |
| 1982 | Subhalekha | Lakshmi | Telugu | |
| 1983 | Maga Maharaju | | Telugu | |
| 1983 | Ee Pillaku Pellavuthundha | | Telugu | |
| 1983 | Konte Kodallu | Bhagyalakshmi | Telugu | |
| 1983 | Nelavanka | Lalita | Telugu | |
| 1983 | Mantri Gari Viyyankudu | Suseela | Telugu | |
| 1984 | Anubandham | | Telugu | |
| 1984 | Kotha Dampathulu | | Telugu | |
| 1984 | Nallavanuku Nallavan | | Tamil | |
| 1984 | Disco King | | Telugu | |
| 1984 | Nagabekamma Nagabeku | | Kannada | |
| 1984 | Indina Ramayana | | Kannada | |
| 1985 | Preminchu Pelladu | | Telugu | |
| 1985 | Rechukka | Roja | Telugu | |
| 1985 | Sri Katna Leelalu | Jyothi | Telugu | |
| 1985 | Muchataga Mugguru | | Telugu | |
| 1985 | Mugguru Mitrulu | | Telugu | |
| 1985 | Srivaru | Rajani | Telugu | |
| 1986 | Driver Babu | Radha | Telugu | |
| 1986 | Henne Ninagenu Bandhana | | Kannada | |
| 1986 | Bhayam Bhayam | | Telugu | |
| 1986 | Naa Pilupe Prabhanjanam | Gayathri | Telugu | |
| 1986 | Aadi Dampatulu | | Telugu | |
| 1986 | Piranthaen Valarnthaen | | Tamil | |
| 1986 | Aranyakanda | Neela | Telugu | |
| 1986 | Poojaku Panikiraani Puvvu | | Telugu | |
| 1987 | Dhoorathu Pachai | Tulasi | Tamil | |
| 1987 | Thambathyam | Aruna | Tamil | |
| 1987 | Daada | | Telugu | |
| 1987 | Raaga Leela | | Telugu | |
| 1988 | Kanchana Seetha | | Telugu | |
| 1988 | Brahma Vishnu Maheshwara | Latha | Kannada | |
| 1988 | Maa Inti Maharaju | | Telugu | |
| 1988 | Jeevana Ganga | | Telugu | |
| 1989 | Zoo Laka Taka | | Telugu | |
| 1989 | Praja Theerpu | | Telugu | |
| 1990 | Alajadi | | Telugu | |
| 1990 | Appu | | Malayalam | |
| 1991 | Amma Rajinama | | Telugu | |
| 1991 | Chitram Bhalare Vichitram | Meera | Telugu | |
| 1991 | Srisaila Bhramarambika Kataksham | | Telugu | |
| 1992 | Killer | | Telugu | |
| 1993 | Kannayya Kittayya | | Telugu | |
| 1993 | Vintha Kodallu | | Telugu | |
| 1994 | Mahanadhi | Manju | Tamil | |
| 1994 | Raithu Bharatam | | Telugu | |
| 2003 | Excuse Me | | Kannada | |
| 2005 | Yashwanth | | Kannada | |
| 2005 | Jootata | Nandini Devi Mallangowda | Kannada | |
| 2005 | Gunna | | Kannada | |
| 2006 | Chellata | | Kannada | |
| 2006 | Sevanthi Sevanthi | | Kannada | |
| 2006 | Honeymoon Express | | Kannada | |
| 2006 | Sirivantha | | Kannada | |
| 2006 | Jothe Jotheyali | | Kannada | |
| 2007 | Poojari | | Kannada | |
| 2007 | Ee Preethi Onthara | | Kannada | |
| 2007 | Savi Savi Nenapu | | Kannada | |
| 2008 | Moggina Manasu | Deeksha's mother | Kannada | |
| 2008 | Sangama | | Kannada | |
| 2008 | Neenyare | | Kannada | |
| 2009 | Sasirekha Parinayam | | Telugu | |
| 2009 | Rajkumari | | Kannada | |
| 2009 | Naa Girlfriend Baga Rich | Sravya's mother | Telugu | |
| 2009 | Jhossh | Sharadamma | Kannada | Filmfare Award for Best Supporting Actress – Kannada |
| 2009 | Minchu | | Kannada | |
| 2009 | Raaj the Showman | | Kannada | |
| 2009 | Rajani | | Kannada | |
| 2010 | Ullasa Utsaha | Kamala | Kannada | |
| 2010 | Punda | | Kannada | |
| 2010 | Nanjangud Nanjunda | | Kannada | |
| 2010 | Sihi Gaali | | Kannada | |
| 2010 | Easan | Shyamala | Tamil | |
| 2010 | Darling | Rajeshwari | Telugu | |
| 2011 | Pillaiyar Theru Kadaisi Veedu | | Tamil | |
| 2011 | Mankatha | | Tamil | |
| 2011 | Mr. Perfect | Vicky's Mother | Telugu | |
| 2012 | Rajadhani | | Kannada | |
| 2012 | Julai | Kaameshwari Murthy | Telugu | |
| 2012 | Paagal | | Kannada | |
| 2012 | Sundarapandian | Archana's mother | Tamil | |
| 2013 | Sthreeshakthi | | Kannada | |
| 2013 | Iddarammayilatho | Komali's mother | Telugu | |
| 2013 | Aadhalal Kadhal Seiveer | Shweta's mother | Tamil | Nominated—Vijay Award for Best Supporting Actress |
| 2013 | Pandiya Naadu | Sivagami Chidambaram | Tamil | |
| 2013 | Khatarnak Umesh Reddy | | Kannada | |
| 2014 | Pannaiyarum Padminiyum | Chellamma | Tamil | Tamil Nadu State Film Award for Best Supporting Actress |
| 2014 | Ambareesha | | Kannada | |
| 2014 | Ninnindale | Lakshmi | Kannada | |
| 2015 | Aambala | Tulasi | Tamil | |
| 2015 | Oru Vadakkan Selfie | Hari's mother | Malayalam | |
| 2015 | Srimanthudu | Narayana Rao's sister-in-law | Telugu | |
| 2015 | Kaththukkutti | Arivazhagan's mother | Tamil | |
| 2015 | Ramleela | | Kannada | |
| 2015 | RX Soori | | Kannada | |
| 2016 | Abbayitho Ammayi | Abhi's mother | Telugu | |
| 2016 | Kalpana 2 | | Kannada | |
| 2016 | Viraat | | Kannada | |
| 2016 | Saagasam | | Tamil | |
| 2016 | Aarathu Sinam | Aravind's mother | Tamil | |
| 2016 | Zero | Priya's neighbour | Tamil | |
| 2016 | Brahmotsavam | Varalakshmi | Telugu | |
| 2016 | Metro | Arivazhagan's mother | Tamil | |
| 2016 | Wagah | Vasu's mother | Tamil | |
| 2016 | Hyper | Surya's mother | Telugu | |
| 2016 | Saptagiri | Saptagiri's mother | Telugu | |
| 2017 | Nenu Local | Siri | Telugu | |
| 2017 | Rogue | | Telugu; Kannada | |
| 2017 | Nakshatram | Rama Rao's mother | Telugu | |
| 2017 | Meda Meeda Abbayi | Srinu's mother | Telugu | |
| 2017 | Nenjil Thunivirundhal | Kumar's mother | Tamil | |
| 2017 | C/O Surya | Surya's mother | Telugu | |
| 2017 | Oye Ninne | Vishnu's mother | Telugu | |
| 2017 | Richie | Radha | Tamil | |
| 2018 | Nimir | Valli's mother | Tamil | |
| 2018 | Mahanati | Madhuravani's mother | Telugu | |
| 2018 | Aatagallu | Munna's mother | Telugu | |
| 2018 | Neevevaro | Kalyan's mother | Telugu | |
| 2018 | Happy Wedding | Akshara's mother | Telugu | |
| 2018 | Nannu Dochukunduvate | Meghana's mother | Telugu | |
| 2018 | Sarkar | M. Masilamani's wife | Tamil | |
| 2019 | Dear Comrade | Jaya's mother | Telugu | |
| 2019 | iSmart Shankar | | Telugu | |
| 2019 | RDX Love | Villager | Telugu | |
| 2019 | Queen | Ranganayaki | Tamil | Web series |
| 2020 | Naadodigal 2 | Jeeva's mother | Tamil | |
| 2021 | Sashi | Raj's mother | Telugu | |
| 2021 | Mosagallu | Padma | Telugu | |
| 2021 | SR Kalyanamandapam | Santhi | Telugu | |
| 2021 | Navarasa | Kamal's mother | Tamil | Web series |
| 2021 | Ellam Sheriyakum | Ancy's mother | Malayalam | |
| 2021 | Adbhutham | Vennala's Grandmother | Telugu | |
| 2021 | Oka Chinna Family Story | Rukmini | Telugu | Web series |
| 2021 | Skylab | Gowri's mother | Telugu | |
| 2022 | Veeramae Vaagai Soodum | Porus's and Dwaraka's mother | Tamil | |
| 2022 | F3 | Venky's stepmother | Telugu | |
| 2022 | Konda | Konda Chennamma | Telugu | |
| 2022 | Karthikeya 2 | Karthik's mother | Telugu | |
| 2022 | Pratibimbalu | Sudha | Telugu | |
| 2022 | Thank You | Abhi's mother | Telugu | |
| 2022 | Vendhu Thanindhathu Kaadu | Durga | Tamil | |
| 2022 | Naan Mirugamaai Maara | Bhoominathan's mother | Tamil | |
| 2022 | Dhamaka | Yashoda Rao | Telugu | |
| 2022 | Anukoni Prayanam | Raju’s wife | Telugu | |
| 2023 | Bhola Shankar | Mahalakshmi’s mother | Telugu | |
| 2023 | Lockdown Diarie | | Tamil | |
| 2023 | Miss Shetty Mr Polishetty | Siddhu's mother and Phanindra's wife | Telugu | |
| 2023 | Saba Nayagan | Saba’s mother | Tamil | |
| 2024 | Rathnam | Malliga's mother | Tamil | |
| 2024 | Shivam Bhaje | Chandu’s mother | Telugu | |
| 2024 | Manamey | Vikram’s mother | Telugu | |
| 2025 | Niram Marum Ulagil | Annakili | Tamil | |
| 2025 | Dilruba | | Telugu | |
| 2025 | Sweetheart! | Pregnant woman's mother | Tamil | |
| 2025 | Meghalu Cheppina Prema Katha | Meghana’s mother | Telugu | |
| 2025 | Krishna Leela | | Telugu | |
| 2025 | Aaromaley | Ajith's mother | Tamil | |
| 2025 | Love OTP | | Telugu; Kannada | |
| 2025 | The Devil | | Kannada | |
| 2025 | Andhra King Taluka | Sagar’s mother | Telugu | |
| 2025 | Unpaarvaiyil | Sujatha | Tamil | Direct release on Sun NXT |
| 2025 | Divya Drusthi | | Telugu | Direct release on Sun NXT |
| 2026 | S Saraswathi | | Telugu | |
| 2026 | Biker | Ananya’s mother | Telugu | |
| 2026 | Sing Geetham | Basavamma | Telugu | |
| 2026 | Korean Kanakaraju | Kanakaraju’s mother | Telugu | |
| 2026 | Black Gold | Selva's mother | Tamil | |

=== Television ===
| Year | Title | Role | Network | Language | Notes | Ref. |
|---|---|---|---|---|---|---|
| 2024 | Bench Life | Meenakshi's mother | SonyLIV | Telugu | | |
| 2024 | Sshhh | | aha | Tamil | Anthology series; segment Kamathupaal | |

== Awards ==
Nandi Awards

- Best Child Actress - Seetamalakshmi (1978)
- Best Child Actress - Sankarabharanam (1980)

Filmfare Awards South

- Filmfare Award for Best Supporting Actress - Kannada - Jhossh
