= Naresh (actor) =

Indian actor, politician and social activist

- Born: Vijaya Krishna Naresh; 20 January 1960 (age 66); Hindupur, Andhra Pradesh, India
- Occupations: Actor; politician; social activist
- Years active: 1970–present
- Spouse(s): Rekha Supriya (divorced); Ramya Raghupati (divorced) Pavitra Lokesh (m. 2023)
- Children: 3
- Parent: Vijaya Nirmala (mother) K. S. Murthy (father)
- Family: See Ghattamaneni Family

Vijaya Krishna Naresh (born 20 January 1960), known mononymously as Naresh, is an Indian actor, politician, and activist, known mainly for his work in Telugu cinema and television. He began his acting career as a child artist in 1970 and went on to feature in approximately 200 films. Some of his notable films are Nalugu Stambhalata (1982), Rendu Jella Sita (1983), Sreevariki Prema Lekha (1984), Sri Kanaka Mahalaxmi Recording Dance Troupe (1987), Manasu Mamatha (1990), Chitram! Bhalare Vichitram!! (1991), Jamba Lakidi Pamba (1992) and Samajavaragamana (2023).

Naresh received the state Nandi Award for Best Actor for Sogasu Chuda Taramaa? (1995), the Nandi Special Jury Award for Chitram Bhalare Vichitram (1991), and the platinum award for best feature film, Parampara (2014). He has also received one Television Nandi Award for his work in Doordarshan's Munimanikyam Gari Kantham Kadhalu.

He starred in the films Shrutilayalu (1987), that premiered at the International Film Festival of India and Hindustan The Mother (2000), which premiered at the International Film Festival of India, BFI London Film Festival and Mumbai Film Festival. In 2007 he appeared in Mee Sreyobhilashi, which also premiered at the International Film Festival of India. In 2014, he acted in Parampara, which won the Platinum Award for Best Feature at the International Indonesian Movie Awards, and premiered at the Jakarta International Film Festival.

Naresh received the Servant of the Poor award on the occasion of the 4th national meet of CNRI held during 4–6 November 2009 at New Delhi, presented by the union Minister for Rural Development C. P. Joshi. In 2017, he spoke about displaying arts in Indian films at the University of Bedfordshire in the presence of the vice chancellor.

== Early and personal life ==
Naresh is the son of Telugu cinema actress Vijaya Nirmala and her first husband, K. S. Murthy. His father died when he was young.

Naresh has been married four times and divorced thrice, as of 2023. Naresh first married the daughter of senior dance master Srinu and the couple has a son named Naveen Vijaykrishna. The couple divorced and he married Rekha Supriya, the granddaughter of famous poet and film lyricist Devulapalli Krishna Sastri. The couple has a son named Teja. Naresh divorced his second wife and then married Ramya Raghupathi who was 15 years younger than him. The couple has a son. In 2023, he married Kannada actress Pavitra Lokesh, 19 years younger than him.

== Career ==
=== Film ===
Naresh made his debut as a child actor in the film Pandanti Kapuram (1972) as well as Kavitha, and Santosh Sowbhagyam. He later made his debut as a lead actor, at the age of 22, with the box office hit Nalugu Stambhalata (1982), directed by Sri Jandhyala and produced by Navata Krishnam Raju. He followed it up with Prema Sankellu (1982), which was directed by his mother Vijaya Nirmala. His other notable works include Rendu Jella Sita (1983), Sreevariki Prema Lekha (1984), Sri Kanaka Mahalaxmi Recording Dance Troupe (1987), Bava Bava Panneeru (1989), Manasu Mamatha (1990), Jamba Lakidi Pamba (1993), and Gunasekhar's Sogasu Chuda Taramaa? (1995). After a small hiatus, he started his second innings as a supporting actor with Allari Ramudu in 2002, and then went on to appear in many memorable films such as: Dhanalakshmi, I Love You (2002), Malliswari (2004), Oka Oorilo (2005), Mee Sreyobhilashi (2007), Andari Bandhuvaya (2010), 100% Love (2011), Chandamama Kathalu and Drushyam (2014), Bhale Bhale Magadivoy (2015), Guntur Talkies (2016), Sathamanam Bhavati (2017), Rangasthalam (2018), and Sammohanam (2018).

Naresh served as the president of the Movie Artists Association from 2019 to 2021.

=== Politics ===
Naresh is also an active politician, and a member of Bharatiya Janata Party state leader.

He worked as a state youth wing president of AP, and state secretary BJP, state general secretary vice president of BJP and also contested from Hindupur parliamentary seat. He also did a 125 km Padayatra from Icchampally Project to Warangal alongside C. Vidyasagar Rao for linking of "Krishna and Godavari" waters and is active in the Rayalaseema development. He is the founder president of KIV Kalakarula Ikya Vidika an NGO a non-profit and non-governmental organization, which works to protect ancient arts and support artists.

== Filmography ==
=== Telugu films ===
Year	Title	Role	Notes
1972	Pandanti Kapuram		
1974	Devadasu		
1975	Santanam Sowbhagyam		
1982	Nalugu Stambhalata	Naresh	
1982	Prema Sankellu		
1983	Puttadi Bomma		
1983	Agni Samadhi		
1983	Puli Debba	Naresh	
1983	Rendu Jella Sita	Gopi	
1984	Yama Doothalu		
1984	Ooha Sundari		
1984	Chadarangam	Raja	
1984	Mukkopi		
1984	Kotha Dampathulu		
1984	Sreevariki Prema Lekha		
1985	Shrivaari Sobhanam		
1985	Mogudu Pellalu		
1986	Jeevana Poratam		
1986	Maavari Gola		
1986	Krishna Paramatma		
1986	Bhayam Bhayam		
1986	Aadi Dampatulu		
1986	Kirayi Mogudu		
1987	Dammit Katha Addam Thirigindi		
1987	Pelliloyi Pellillu		
1987	Kulala Kurukshetram		
1987	Lawyer Bharathi Devi		
1987	Paga Sadistha		
1987	Srimathi Oka Bahumathi		
1987	Shrutilayalu		
1987	Sri Kanaka Mahalaxmi Recording Dance Troupe	Gopalam	
1988	Choopulu Kalasina Shubhavela		
1988	Sri Tatavatharam		
1988	Collector Vijaya		
1988	Premayanam		
1988	Nava Bharatham		
1989	Bava Bava Panneeru		
1989	Two Town Rowdy		
1989	Sahasame Naa Oopiri	Shankar	
1989	Pinni		
1989	Gandipeta Rahasyam		
1989	Hai Hai Nayaka	Ramakrishna	
1989	Police Report		
1990	Alajadi		
1990	Justice Rudrama Devi		
1990	Kokila	Siddhartha	
1990	Manasu Mamatha		
1990	Bujjigadi Babai		
1990	Irugilli Porugillu		
1990	Padmavati Kalyanam		
1990	Prajala Manishi	Vikram	
1990	Police Bharya		
1991	Nenera Police		
1991	Naa Pellam Naa Ishtam		
1991	Prema Enta Madhuram		
1991	Shiva Shakti		
1991	Chitram Bhalare Vichitram	Nimmagadda Rajeswara Rao "Raja"/Prema	Also singer for "Brahmachaarulam"
1991	Pichchi Pullayya		
1992	Adrishtam		
1992	Mogudu Pellala Dongata		
1992	Ayyayyo Brahmayya		
1992	Hello Darling		
1992	Pelli Neeku Shubham Naaku		
1993	Enti Bava Mareenu		
1993	Chitikela Pandiri		
1993	Ladies Special	himself	
1993	Illu Pelli		
1993	Asale Pellaina Vanni		
1993	Jamba Lakidi Pamba		
1993	Konguchaatu Krishnaudu		
1993	Prema Chitram Pelli Vichitram		
1994	Aame	Vikram	
1994	Prema & Co		
1994	Pelli Koduku		
1995	Sogasu Chuda Taramaa?		
1996	Shri Krishnarjuna Vijayam	Narada	
1996	Rendu Kutumbala Katha		
1997	Mama Bagunnaavaa		
1997	Thoka Leni Pitta		
1998	Life Lo Wife		
2000	Hindustan The Mother		
2002	Chandravamsam		
2002	Sontham		
2002	Allari Ramudu		
2002	Dhanalakshmi, I Love You	Babu Rao	
2003	Villain		
2004	Gowri		
2004	Malliswari	Prasad 's elder brother	
2005	Chandra Vamsham		
2005	Oka Oorilo		
2005	Orey Pandu		
2006	Nandanavanam 120km		
2006	Premante Inte		
2007	Madhumasam	Sanjay's elder brother	
2007	Maharathi		
2007	Mee Sreyobhilashi	Surya Prakash Rao	
2007	Veduka		
2007	Yamadonga		
2007	Yamagola Malli Modalayindi	Aishwarya's father	
2008	Ankit, Pallavi & Friends		
2008	Naa Manasukemaindi		
2008	Ontari		
2008	Vaana		
2008	Andamaina Abaddam		
2009	Maska	Krish's brother	
2009	Vaade Kaavaali		
2010	Maro Charitra		
2010	Andari Bandhuvaya	Nandu's father	
2010	Varudu	Deepthi's father	
2011	100% Love	Ramesh, Balu's father	
2011	Mogudu	Shankar Rao	
2012	Yamudiki Mogudu	Narada, Trishanku	
2013	1000 Abaddalu	Satya’s father	
2013	Aadu Magaadra Bujji	Siddhu’s father	
2014	Anaamika	Home Minister Aadhikesavayya	Bilingual film
2014	Chandamama Kathalu	Mohan	
2014	Drushyam	Prabhakar	
2014	Mike Testing 143		
2014	Ori Devudoy		
2014	Parampara		
2014	Chinnadana Nee Kosam	Nithin's father	
2015	Beeruva	Surya Narayana	
2015	Gaddam Gang	Dharmaraju	
2015	Bhale Bhale Magadivoy	Hanumantha Rao	
2015	Subramanyam for Sale	Subramanyam's father	
2016	Eedu Gold Ehe	Buchchaiah Chowdary	
2016	Guntur Talkies	Giri	
2016	Hyper	Narayana Murthy's friend	
2016	A...Aa	Ramalingam	
2016	Brahmotsavam	Mahalakshmi's brother	
2016	Garam	Ravi’s father	
2016	Nenu Sailaja	Hari's father	
2016	Sri Sri		
2016	Ghatana	Prakash	Bilingual film
2017	Sathamanam Bhavati	Bangarraju	
2017	MCA (Middle Class Abbayi)	Nani's uncle	
2018	Chalo	Abhi's Father	
2018	Toli Prema	House Owner	
2018	Chal Mohan Ranga	Mohan's father	
2018	Rangasthalam	Koteswara Rao	
2018	Sammohanam	Sarvesh "Sarva"	
2018	Pedavi Datani Matokatundhi		
2018	Happy Wedding	Anand's father	
2018	Srinivasa Kalyanam	Raju	
2018	Sailaja Reddy Alludu	Venu Reddy	
2018	Mahanati	Cameraman Keshava	
2018	Devadas	Mohan, Das's brother	
2018	Aravinda Sametha Veera Raghava	Saradhi	
2018	NTR: Kathanayakudu	B. A. Subba Rao	
2018	24 Kisses	Sri Lakshmi's father	
2019	1st Rank Raju	Shoban Babu	
2019	RDX Love	Villager	
2019	Prati Roju Pandage	Naresh Prasad	
2020	Entha Manchivaadavuraa	Vijayakrishna	
2020	Disco Raja	Kukuteshwar Rao	
2020	Bheeshma	Anand Prasad	
2020	Uma Maheswara Ugra Roopasya	Babji	
2020	V	Aditya's father	
2020	Amaram Akhilam Prema	Amar's father	
2020	Orey Bujjiga	Krishnaveni's father	
2020	Miss India	Siva Rama Krishna	
2020	Solo Brathuke So Better	Virat's father	
2021	Jathi Ratnalu	Satish Janardhan	
2021	Sreekaram	Ramana	
2021	Rang De	Arjun's father	
2021	Sridevi Soda Center	Sanjeev Rao	
2021	Tuck Jagadish	Sathi Babu	
2021	Maestro	Mohan	
2021	Pushpaka Vimanam	School headmaster	
2021	Drushyam 2	Prabhakar	
2021	Arjuna Phalguna	Village Sarpanch	
2022	Super Machi		
2022	Hero	Arjun's father	
2022	Ghani	Ghani's college coach	
2022	Ante Sundaraniki	Sundar's father	
2022	Ranga Ranga Vaibhavanga	Rishi's father	
2022	Swathi Muthyam	Bhagi's father	
2022	Ginna	Veera Swamy	
2023	Anni Manchi Sakunamule	Sudhakar	Nominated–SIIMA Award for Best Supporting Actor – Telugu
2023	Malli Pelli	Narendra	Also Producer
2023	Samajavaragamana	Uma Maheshwara Rao	
2023	The Great Indian Suicide	Ballari Neelakantam	
2023	Martin Luther King	Jogi	
2024	Veeranjaneyulu Viharayatra	Vididhinti Nageswara Rao	
2024	Mechanic Rocky	Nagumomu Ramakrishna	
2025	Game Changer	Ram’s adoptive father	
2025	Sankranthiki Vasthunam	D. Keshava	
2025	Jack	Prasad	
2025	Sri Sri Sri Raja Vaaru	Subbaraju	
2025	Show Time	A. Varada Rajulu	
2025	Sundarakanda	Surendra	
2025	Beauty	Narayana	
2025	K-Ramp	Naresh	
2025	Enuguthondam Ghatikachalam	Ghatikachalam	
2025	Mass Jathara	Dharmaraju	
2025	Champion	Chandrakala’s father	
2026	Nari Nari Naduma Murari	Karthik	
2026	Hey Balwanth	Rao Balwanth	
2026	Bad Boy Karthik	Shiva	
2026	Sathi Leelavathi		
2026	Srinivasa Mangapuram		

=== Tamil films ===
Year	Title	Role	Notes
1984	Nenjathai Allitha	Murali	
1985	Porutham		
2014	Malini 22 Palayamkottai	Prakash	Bilingual films
2014	Nee Enge En Anbe	Home Minister Aadhikesavayya	Bilingual films
2015	Sandamarutham	DGP Rathinasamy IPS	
2016	Peigal Jaakkirathai	Saravanan's father	

=== Television ===
Year	Title	Role	Network	Notes	Ref.
1991	Munimanikyam Gari Kantham Kathalu	Venkata Rao	Doordarshan		
1997	Popula Pette	Kameswara Rao "Kamesam"	ETV		
2003	Amrutham	Icchapurapu Amrutha Rao	Gemini TV	Episodes 63–105	
2008	Open Heart with RK	Himself	ABN Andhra Jyothi		
2009	Count Down	Himself	ETV		
2012	Maa Nanna	Sivayya	Gemini TV		
2013	Mahalakshmi Nivasam	Viswanatha Raju	Gemini TV		
2019	Alitho Saradaga	Himself	ETV	Episode 114	
2021	Oka Chinna Family Story	Haridas	ZEE5		
2022	Modern Love Hyderabad		Amazon Prime Video		
2023	Maya Bazaar For Sale		ZEE5		

== Awards ==
- Nandi Award for Best Actor – Sogasu Chuda Taramaa? (1995)
- Nandi Special Jury Award – Chitram Bhalare Vichitram (1992)
- Nandi Award for Best Character Actor – Parampara (2013)
- Nandi Award for Best Character Actor – Sathamanam Bhavati (2017)
- Best Character Actor Award – Sathamanam Bhavati (2017) at 17th Santosham Film Awards
- Nandi Best Actor Television – Munimanikyam Gari Kantham Kadhalu (1991)
- SVR Character Award – Sathamanam Bhavati (2017)
- Received the title H.E. (his Excellency) and received a PhD in arts from the U.N. ICDRHRP (2018)
