= Sampradayini Suppini Suddapoosani =

2026 Indian Telugu film by Sudheer Sriram

- Theatrical release poster
- Directed by: Sudheer Sriram
- Written by: Mithil Kumar K; Sudheer Sriram
- Produced by: Sivaji
- Starring: Sivaji; Laya; Rohan Roy
- Cinematography: Ritwik Reddy
- Edited by: Balu Manoj D
- Music by: Ranjin Raj
- Production companies: Sree Sivaji Productions; ETV Win
- Distributed by: Bunny Vas Works; Vamshi Nandipati Entertainments
- Release date: 6 March 2026
- Running time: 144 minutes
- Country: India
- Language: Telugu

Sampradayini Suppini Suddapoosani is a 2026 Indian Telugu-language crime comedy film co-written and directed by Sudheer Sriram. It stars Sivaji, Laya and Rohan Roy.

The film was released on 6 March 2026.

== Cast ==
- Sivaji as Sriram
- Laya as Utthara
- Rohan Roy as Mittu, Sriram and Utthara’s son
- Prince Cecil as SI Vikram
- Ali as Raghava
- Sharath Lohithaswa as MLA Thimmappa
- Dhanraj Koranani as Constable Y. Sudheer
- Karan Vijay as Madan
- Jabardasth Emmanuel as Michael
- Kadambari Kiran as HC K. Subrahmanyam
- Raj Tirandasu as Edukondalu
- Pammi Sai as Prasad, Thimmappa’s PA
- Auto Ramprasad as Uttara’s brother
- Pradeep Kondiparthi as G. Gurumurthy, Utthara's father
- Rajitha as Utthara's mother
- Raghu Babu as Meeravali
- Prudhvi Raj as SI B. Veera Naidu
- Sameer as Checkpost Officer
- Annapurna as Sriram’s Neighbor
- Jogi Krishnam Raju as Reddy, Thimmappa’s friend
- Rocket Raghava as Azam
- Bhole Shavali as Singer
- Sonia Chowdary
- Chitram Srinu as Driving Instructor
- Raghu Karumanchi as Goon
- Thagubothu Ramesh
- Chammak Chandra as Chandra
- Satish Saripalli as Chandra’s co-worker
- Bandla Ganesh (special appearance in the song "Paaya Paaya")

== Music ==
The background score is composed by Ranjin Raj. The film features one song composed by Bhole Shavali.

Track listing
No.	Title	Lyrics	Music	Singer(s)	Length
1.	"Paaya Paaya"	Manoj Jooluri, Syedd Shabuddin	Bhole Shavali	Bhole Shavali	3:19

== Release ==
Sampradayini Suppini Suddapoosani was initially scheduled to release directly on ETV Win on 12 February 2026 but was released first in movie theaters on 6 March 2026. It was later released on Netflix on 3 April 2026.

== Reception ==
Suresh Kavirayani of The New Indian Express rated it 2 out of 5 and felt that Sudheer Sreeram needs to focus more on stronger writing in the future. Shreya Varanasi of The Times of India also gave the same rating and wrote that the film "offers a few scattered laughs and sincere performances, but its uneven writing and predictable crime plot prevent it from becoming a satisfying crime comedy". A critic of Telugucinema.com opined that "sluggish screenplay, and amateurish direction make it a dull and underwhelming watch". Sakshi Post rated it 1.5 out of 5 and stated that "the film's biggest problem lies in its weak and unfocused screenplay".
