= Hyper (2016 film) =

2016 Indian film by Santosh Srinivas

- Directed by: Santosh Srinivas
- Written by: Santosh Srinivas
- Produced by: Gopichand Achanta; Anil Sunkara
- Starring: Ram Pothineni; Raashii Khanna; Sathyaraj
- Cinematography: Sameer Reddy
- Edited by: Gautham Raju
- Music by: Songs: Ghibran; Background Score: Mani Sharma
- Production company: 14 Reels Entertainment
- Release date: 30 September 2016
- Running time: 143 minutes
- Country: India
- Language: Telugu

Hyper is a 2016 Indian Telugu-language action-comedy drama film directed by Santosh Srinivas and produced by 14 Reels Entertainment. The film features Ram Pothineni, Raashii Khanna, and Sathyaraj in the lead roles, while Rao Ramesh, Murali Sharma, Naresh, Thulasi Shivamani, Sayaji Shinde, Posani Krishna Murali, and Brahmaji play supporting roles. The songs featured in the film are composed by Ghibran, while the background score is composed by Mani Sharma. The film was released worldwide on 30 September 2016.

== Plot ==
Narayana Murthy (Sathyaraj) is an honest government employee whose son Suryanarayana Murthy (Ram Pothineni) loves him in such a way that he is ready to die or kill anyone. One day, when he was about to meet with an accident, Gaja (Murali Sharma) a gangster protects him, and the two become friends. One day, Minister Rajappa (Rao Ramesh) blackmails Narayana Murthy to get approval for a building which was illegally constructed. Rajappa orders his right-hand man Gaja to kill Narayana Murthy's family. The rest of the story follows Surya as he tries to protect his family from Rajappa.

== Cast ==
- Ram Pothineni as Suryanarayana Murthy "Surya"
- Raashii Khanna as Bhanumathi
- Sathyaraj as Narayana Murthy, Suri's father
- Rao Ramesh as Minister Veera Venkata Shivalinga Rajappa
- Murali Sharma as Gaja Bhai
- Naresh as Narayana Murthy's friend
- Tulasi as Suri's mother
- Sayaji Shinde as Udaya Shankar (Special Officer)
- Suman as Rama Chandra, Priyanka's fiancé's father
- Posani Krishna Murali as Bhanumathi's father
- Brahmaji as Bhanumathi's boss
- Hema as Bhanumathi's mother
- Annapoorna as Suri's grandmother
- Mamilla Shailaja Priya as Gaja's wife
- Prabhas Sreenu as Raghupati Raghava Rajaram, Gaja's henchman
- Fish Venkat as Rajappa's henchmen
- K. Vishwanath as Seetharamayya (Chief Minister)
- Chandra Mohan as Priest
- Suddala Ashok Teja as Chief Secretary
- Jaya Prakash Reddy as Party President
- Praveen as Priest
- Satyam Rajesh as Traffic Police Officer
- G. V. Sudhakar Naidu as Local Goon
- Sivannarayana Naripeddi as Rajappa's brother-in-law
- Priyanka Nalkari as Priyanka, Suri's sister
- Vajja Venkata Giridhar as Traffic Police
- Arundhati Aravind as Shankar (Gaja's Brother in law)

== Soundtrack ==
Hyper

Film score by Ghibran
- Released: 8 September 2016
- Recorded: 2016
- Genre: Soundtrack
- Label: Lahari Music
- Producer: Ghibran

Ghibran chronology
Babu Bangaram (2016)	Hyper (2016)	Adhe Kangal (2017)

The music for the songs is composed by Ghibran and released on Lahari Music company. Mani Sharma composed the background score of the film.

No.	Title	Lyrics	Singer(s)	Length
1.	"Come Back Come Back"	Srimani	Anudeep, Yazin Nizar
2.	"Ompula Dhaniya"	Bhaskarabhatla	Dhanunjay, Simha, Lipsika
3.	"Baby Doll"	Ramajogayya Sastry	Anurag Kulkarni, Sahithi Chaganti
4.	"Naalo Nenena"	Srimani	Sameera Bharadwaj
5.	"Hypare Hypare"	Bhaskarabhatla	Dhanunjay, Geetha Madhuri, Lipsika

== Reception ==
A critic from The Hindu wrote that "Sathyaraj and Rao Ramesh, who steals the show yet again, are the film’s saving grace". Pranitha Jonnalagedda of The Times of India said that "The film is predictable at places and endearing at times. But on the whole, it feels like watching paint dry. Here’s a film which has its heart in the right place but the beats aren’t quite right". Jeevi of Idlebrain.com opined that "On a whole, Hyper is a film made for the masses".
