= Nelavanka =

- Theatrical poster
- Directed by: Jandhyala
- Written by: Jandhyala
- Produced by: A. S. Anjaneyulu; M. Narasimha Rao
- Starring: Gummadi; J. V. Somayajulu; Rajesh; Kiran; Tulasi; Rajyalakshmi
- Cinematography: S. Gopal Reddy
- Edited by: Gowtam Raju
- Music by: Ramesh Naidu
- Release date: 25 January 1983 (India)
- Country: India
- Language: Telugu

Nelavanka (transl. Crescent Moon) is a 1983 Indian Telugu-language film directed by Jandhyala and starring Gummadi, J. V. Somayajulu, Rajesh, Kiran, Tulasi and Rajyalakshmi.

== Cast ==
- Gummadi as Srirama Raju
- J. V. Somayajulu as Raheem
- Rajesh as Saleem
- Kiran as Kiran
- Tulasi as Lalita
- Rajyalakshmi as Savitri
- Master Ali as Ali
- Muddali Susheela as Rameswari
- C. Rammohana Rao as Srirama Raju's brother
- K. Sambasiva Rao as Seshayya, servant
- Prameela Rani as Srirama Raju's wife
- Potti Prasad as Gurrala Guravayya
- Eswara Rao as Ravi
- Suthivelu as Dongre Sastry, Ayurveda doctor
- Sutti Veerabhadra Rao as Dongre Sastry's compounder
- Gangarathnam as Raheem's mother
- Sakshi Ranga Rao
- Balaji as Saleem's assistant

== Production ==
The film was shot at Muktyala Palace in a single schedule from 23 June 1982 to 5 August 1982. The film marked the debut of S. Gopal Reddy's Brother in law Anoor (credited as Kiran in the film) and Rajyalakshmi's mother Sabharanjani. Balaji's role was initially meant for Jitmohan Mitra, who couldn't act due to scheduling conflicts.

== Soundtrack ==
All lyrics are written by Indraganti Srikantha Sarma & Udaybhaskar Rao; all music is composed by Ramesh Naidu.

Songs
No.	Title	Playback	Length
1.	"Edi Matam, Edi Hitam?"	S. P. Balasubrahmanyam
2.	"Enta Cheppinaa Vinavemiraa"	Ramola, Jitmohan Mitra, Prakash Rao
3.	"Go Gummadi Go Gummadi"	S. P. Balasubrahmanyam, S. Janaki, Jitmohan Mitra
4.	"Kanubommala Pallakilpna Kanne Siggu Vadhuvayyindi"	S. P. Balasubrahmanyam, S. Janaki
5.	"Mehfil Mein Aaj Dhoom Uthee"	S. P. Balasubrahmanyam, S. Janaki
6.	"Sogasari Bomma Koyilallo"	S. P. Balasubrahmanyam
7.	"Sutti Song"	S. P. Balasubrahmanyam, Prakash Rao
