= Kshana Kshanam =

- Theatrical release poster
- Directed by: Ram Gopal Varma
- Written by: Story & Screenplay: Ram Gopal Varma; Dialogues: Satyanand
- Produced by: K. L. Narayana; Y. Lakshmana Chowdary; S. Gopal Reddy (Presenter)
- Starring: Venkatesh; Sridevi; Paresh Rawal; Rami Reddy
- Cinematography: S. Gopal Reddy
- Edited by: Shankar
- Music by: M. M. Keeravani
- Production company: Sri Durga Arts
- Release date: 9 October 1991
- Running time: 158 minutes
- Country: India
- Language: Telugu

Kshana Kshanam (transl. Every Moment) is a 1991 Indian Telugu-language road thriller film written and directed by Ram Gopal Varma. The film stars Venkatesh, Sridevi, Paresh Rawal, and Rami Reddy. The plot follows Satya (Sridevi), a young woman who is hounded by a gang of robbers headed by Nayyar (Rawal) and the police. With the help of a pickpocket, Chandu (Venkatesh), she escapes into the forests.

Varma introduced road and film noir to the Indian screen with Kshana Kshanam. Varma experimented with close-to-life performances by the lead actors, which brought a rather fictional storyline a sense of authenticity at a time when the industry was being filled with unnecessary commercial fillers.

Featured at the Ann Arbor Film Festival, and the Fribourg Festival, it went on to gather a cult following. It won five state Nandi Awards, including Best Direction, Best Screenplay, and a Filmfare Award for Best Actress – Telugu to Sridevi. Varma later remade Kshana Kshanam in Hindi as Daud, and produced road films such as Thiruda Thiruda, Anaganaga Oka Roju and Road.

== Plot ==
Narayana and his accomplice, working under the orders of ruthless gangster Nayar, execute a high-profile bank robbery in Hyderabad, stealing ₹1 crore. Discovered by the police, the heist culminates in a violent shootout and a frantic vehicle chase, resulting in casualties on both sides. Attempting to keep the entire loot for himself, Narayana turns rogue, kills his accomplice, and betrays Nayar. With law enforcement sealing all transit routes out of Hyderabad, Nayar’s syndicate tracks Narayana to his brother’s photography studio. Moments before his capture, Narayana covertly conceals a crucial clue regarding the stolen money inside a standard photo envelope.

Narayana is brutally tortured by Nayar's men and eventually discloses the location of the clue. However, before the gang can retrieve it, the specific envelope is unwittingly collected by Satya, an ordinary middle-class working woman. Before succumbing to his injuries, a dying Narayana reveals the truth and the nature of the clue to his brother. Returning to her apartment, Satya is accosted by one of Nayar’s enforcers demanding the envelope. In a frantic bid to escape, Satya accidentally stabs the thug. A nosy neighbor witnesses the commotion and alerts the authorities. As the wounded henchman attempts to attack again, he is fatally stabbed in the back by Narayana's vengeful brother, who flees the scene.

Concurrently, Chandu is a small-time con artist who frequently masquerades as a police officer to swindle citizens. While resting at a roadside eatery, Satya arrives and uses the public telephone to inform a friend of the incident, unaware that the police are wiretapping the line. When a group of local hoodlums begins harassing Satya, Chandu intervenes to protect her. As Satya thanks him, the police descend upon the venue. Erroneously assuming the authorities are tracking his own fraudulent activities, Chandu takes Satya hostage at gunpoint, and the duo escapes into the dense surrounding jungle. Nayar's syndicate and the police, led by Inspector Yadav, launch parallel manhunts into the wilderness.

Navigating the perilous terrain while evading the police, Nayar’s gang, and Narayana's brother, Chandu and Satya gradually develop mutual affection. Following a brief capture and subsequent escape from Nayar, Chandu deduces that the coveted envelope holds the key to a massive fortune. Commandeering one of Nayar’s cargo trucks, the duo escapes the jungle and slips back into the city. Recognizing that Satya’s apartment is monitored as an active crime scene, Chandu and Satya scale the exterior of the building through a neighbor’s balcony to retrieve the photograph. They discover that the envelope contains a luggage storage receipt for the Hyderabad railway station cloakroom.

After neutralizing a henchman at Chandu's apartment, Chandu departs to consult a friend, leaving a bound enforcer under Satya's supervision. The henchman breaks free, subdues Satya, and alerts Nayar. Meanwhile, Chandu decides to return half the stolen money to the state and keep the rest, but he is ambushed upon his return and forced to surrender the storage receipt to Nayar. A sudden police raid, triggered by an informant, sparks a chaotic three-way shootout. Chandu exploits the confusion, reclaims the receipt from Nayar, and flees to the railway station with Satya, closely pursued by both the syndicate and Inspector Yadav.

At the station, the duo retrieves the bag of cash and boards a moving train to escape. Nayar and his remaining men infiltrate the train at the subsequent stop, leading to a visceral battle atop the railcars. Cornered at gunpoint by Nayar, Chandu dangles the money bag over the edge of the speeding train, threatening to drop it if fired upon. Desperate, Nayar attempts to force the conductor to stop the train, resulting in a struggle that causes the driver and henchman to fall from the cabin. Chandu uncouples the locomotive from the passenger cars, grabs the money, and leaps to safety with Satya just before the engine derails into an abandoned settlement. Nayar is promptly arrested at the crash site. Questioned by Satya regarding his integrity, Chandu chooses to return the full amount to Inspector Yadav. The film concludes as Satya invites an amused Chandu to her home to meet her mother.

== Cast ==
- Venkatesh as Chandu
- Sridevi as Satya
- Paresh Rawal as Nayar
- Rami Reddy as Inspector Yadav
- Brahmanandam as Store Manager
- Narsing Yadav as Narsing
- Hema as Sarala
- Horse Babu as Narayana
- Jack Gaud as Ungan
- Oru Viral Krishna Rao as Apartment resident
- Manik Irani as Nayar gang member

== Production ==
After the success of Siva (1989), cinematographer S. Gopal Reddy approached Varma to make a film with Sridevi. Varma, being an ardent fan of hers, agreed to it and called the film "a love letter to her". Takkari Donga Chakkani Chukka and 36 Gantalu were initially considered as the film's titles.

Filming was done in Hyderabad, Nallamala forests, and Mudumalai National Park. The climax was filmed at Nandyal. Sridevi's character was named after Satya, a woman who Ram Gopal Varma used to love in college, who did not love him back. The song "Ko Ante Koti" ("Kingu La Kanipisthunnadu") was shot in The Leela Mumbai.

== Soundtrack ==
Kshana Kshanam

Soundtrack album by M. M. Keeravani
- Released: 1991
- Recorded: 1991
- Genre: Soundtrack
- Length: 28:37
- Label: Surya Audio
- Producer: M. M. Keeravani

M. M. Keeravani chronology
| Azhagan (1991) | Kshana Kshanam (1991) | Neelagiri (1991) |

The film's music was composed by M. M. Keeravani, who revealed that it took him 12 days to compose the background score. This was due to the film being the first in Telugu to use a 6-track sound system, which introduced new technical challenges in sound design.

The song "Jaamu Raatiri," with lyrics by Sirivennela Seetharama Sastry and sung by S. P. Balasubrahmanyam and K. S. Chithra, is regarded as a timeless classic. A revamped version of the song was released on 23 August 2019 by Vel Records. The new version featured vocals by Hemachandra, Kaala Bhairava, Manisha Eerabathini, Deepu, Damini, Mounima, Shruthi, Noel Sean, and Prudhvi Chandhra.

Telugu Track-List
| No. | Title | Lyrics | Singer(s) | Length |
|---|---|---|---|---|
| 1. | "Jaamu Raatiri" | Sirivennela Sitaramasastri | S. P. Balasubrahmanyam, Chitra | 4:59 |
| 2. | "Jumbaaye" | Vennelakanti | Chitra, Mano | 6:55 |
| 3. | "Ammayi Muddu" | Sirivennela Sitaramasastri | S. P. Balasubrahmanyam, Chitra | 5:37 |
| 4. | "Andanantha Etta" | Sirivennela Sitaramasastri | S. P. Balasubrahmanyam, Chitra | 5:18 |
| 5. | "Ko Ante Koti" | Sirivennela Sitaramasastri | S. P. Balasubrahmanyam, Sridevi | 5:25 |
| Total length: | | | | 28:37 |

Tamil Track-List
| No. | Title | Singer(s) | Length |
|---|---|---|---|
| 1. | "Kattazhagu Rani" | S. P. Balasubrahmanyam, K. S. Chithra |
| 2. | "Thanimai Ratri" | S. P. Balasubrahmanyam, K. S. Chithra |
| 3. | "Inru Naan Kadhal Rani" | S. P. Balasubrahmanyam, K. S. Chithra |
| 4. | "Ammadi Muthum" | S. P. Balasubrahmanyam, K. S. Chithra |
| 5. | "Ada Machhinikki" | S. P. Balasubrahmanyam, K. S. Chithra |

== Release ==
Kshana Kshanam was released on 9 October 1991. The film was dubbed and released in Tamil as Ennamo Nadakudhu and in Hindi as Hairaan in October 1992.

== Reception ==
Griddaluru Gopalrao of Zamin Ryot wrote his review on 18 October 1991, appreciating the performances of the lead cast and the action sequences. Gopalrao, however, opined that the writing could have been better. He felt that the suspense was diluted because the audience was fed details which the characters themselves were not aware of. On 16 October 1992, Malini Mannath of The Indian Express termed the film a "comic-thriller." She wrote that "The climax scene on a train has been superbly directed."

In July 2020, The News Minute's Balakrishna Ganeshan opined that the Kshana Kshanam tells the story from a female perspective which is rare in Indian cinema, however, he added that the film still suffers from male saviour complex. On the performance of the lead cast, he wrote: "Sridevi and Venkatesh are understated and subtle in their respective performances." Appreciating the cinematography, he stated: "S Gopal Reddy's cinematography too deserves mention. The film has a lot of top angle shots during the chasing sequences, which establish the chaos and keep the film fast-paced."

The soundtrack and score were composed by M. M. Keeravani received positive reviews. The narrative by Varma and the cinematography by S. Gopala Reddy were appreciated.

== Awards ==
Nandi Awards

- Best Director - Ram Gopal Varma
- Best Actress - Sridevi
- Best Screenplay Writer - Ram Gopal Varma
- Best Cinematographer - S. Gopala Reddy
- Best Editor - Shankar

Filmfare Awards South

- Best Actress – Telugu - Sridevi
- Best Music Director - Telugu - M. M. Keeravani
