= Pradeep Kondiparthi =

Indian actor

- Born: Vijayawada, Andhra Pradesh, India
- Occupation: Actor
- Years active: 1982–present

Pradeep Kondiparthi is an Indian actor known for his works in Telugu cinema, theatre, and television. He is widely known for portraying Character actor roles in a variety of genres. Pradeep has starred in over eighty serials, and twenty feature films. In Television he is known for his works in Doordarshan, and conducts personality and corporate development seminars.

== Selected filmography ==
As actor

Year	Title	Role	Ref.
1981	Mudda Mandaram	Pradeep	
1982	Nalugu Stambalata	Pradeep Kumar	
1983	Rendu Jella Sita	Krishna	
2006	Gopi – Goda Meeda Pilli	Sudeep	
2008	Premabhishekam	Sridevi's father	
2019	F2: Fun and Frustration	Govindharaju	
2019	Chitralahari	Krishna Rao	
2022	F3	Harika's and Honey's father	
2023	Bhola Shankar	Vamsi’s father-in-law	
2026	Cheekatilo	Sandhya’s father	
2026	Sampradayini Suppini Suddapoosani	Gurumurthy	

== Television ==
Soap operas

- Anaganaga Sobhu
- Matti Manushulu
- Pelli Pandhiri
- Chaanakya
- Saadhana
- Butchi Babu
- Anando Brahm
- Mamathala Kovela as Sarvarayudu
