= Muchataga Mugguru =

- Theatrical release poster
- Directed by: Relangi Narasimha Rao
- Written by: D. V. Narasa Raju (dialogues)
- Screenplay by: Relangi Narasimha Rao
- Story by: S. S. Creations Unit
- Produced by: Yarlagadda Surendra; D. Ramanaidu (Presents)
- Starring: Chandra Mohan; Rajendra Prasad; Tulasi; Poornima
- Cinematography: S. Harinath
- Edited by: D. Raja Gopal
- Music by: Chakravarthy
- Production company: S. S. Creations
- Release date: 10 May 1985
- Running time: 135 mins
- Country: India
- Language: Telugu

Muchataga Mugguru is a 1985 Telugu-language comedy film directed by Relangi Narasimha Rao. Produced by Yarlagadda Surendra and presented by D. Ramanaidu, the film stars Chandra Mohan, Rajendra Prasad, Tulasi, Poornima with music composed by Chakravarthy. The film was recorded as a Super Hit at the box office.

== Cast ==
- Chandra Mohan as Rambabu
- Rajendra Prasad as Ramesh
- Tulasi as Radha
- Poornima as Vaani
- Satyanarayana as Kutumbayya
- Nutan Prasad as Nutan Prasad
- Allu Ramalingaiah as Linga Rao
- Suthi Veerabhadra Rao as General Manager
- Devadas Kanakala as Doctor
- Rama Prabha as Rama Devi
- Mamatha as Sachu
- Nirmalamma as Seshamma

== Music ==
Muchataga Mugguru

Film score by Chakravarthy
- Released: 1985
- Genre: Soundtrack
- Length: 16:17
- Label: AVM Audio
- Producer: Chakravarthy

Chakravarthy chronology
Swathi (1985)	Muchataga Mugguru (1985)	Siksha (1985)

Music as composed by Chakravarthy. Lyrics were written by Veturi. Music was released on AVM Audio Company.

S.No	Song title	Singers	length
1	"Muchataga Mugguram"	S. P. Balasubrahmanyam, P. Susheela, S. P. Sailaja	4:12
2	"Chinuku Vachi Thakala"	S. P. Balasubrahmanyam, P. Susheela	3:56
3	"Oho Tharaka"	S. P. Balasubrahmanyam	4:26
4	"Konga Konga"	Madhapeddi Ramesh, N. Babu, Manju, Ramola	3:43
