= Govinda Govinda (1994 film) =

1994 Telugu film by Ram Gopal Varma

- Movie Poster
- Directed by: Ram Gopal Varma
- Screenplay by: Ram Gopal Varma; Jandhyala (dialogues)
- Story by: Ram Gopal Varma; Kommanapalli
- Produced by: C. Aswani Dutt
- Starring: Nagarjuna; Sridevi; Master Anil Raj; Paresh Rawal
- Cinematography: S. Gopal Reddy
- Edited by: Shankar
- Music by: Raj–Koti
- Production company: Vyjayanthi Movies
- Release date: 21 January 1994
- Running time: 145 mins
- Country: India
- Language: Telugu

Govinda Govinda is a 1994 Indian Telugu-language supernatural heist film written and directed by Ram Gopal Varma. Produced by C. Aswani Dutt on Vyjayanthi Movies banner, the film stars Nagarjuna and Sridevi in lead roles, alongside Paresh Rawal, Kota Srinivasa Rao, and Master Anil Raj. The music was composed by Raj–Koti.

Released on 21 January 1994, the film was a commercial failure. However, the music by Raj–Koti was well-received and praised for its freshness and appeal. It was later dubbed into Hindi as The Great Robbery.

== Plot ==
Prologue

Between the Treta Yuga and Kali Yuga, sage Bhrugu performs a Loka Kalyana Yaga and visits Vaikuntam to meet Vishnu. Finding Vishnu resting on Adisesha with Mahalakshmi in service at his feet, Bhriugu becomes enraged when Vishnu does not acknowledge him and kicks Vishnu on his chest, where Mahalakshmi resides. To pacify him, Vishnu gently presses Bhrugu's legs, squeezing an extra eye on the sage's sole that symbolized his ego. Realizing his mistake, Bhrugu apologizes and declares Vishnu as the supreme among the Trimurti.

However, Mahalakshmi, angered by Vishnu's actions, leaves Vaikuntam. Distraught, Vishnu descends to Earth, residing under a tamarind tree on the Venkata hill, meditating without food or sleep, awaiting Lakshmi's return. Concerned about the Universe's balance, the Devatas appeal to Vishnu, leading Him to incarnate as Venkateswara in Kali Yuga.

Present Day

In Bangkok, an occultist named Stavros devises a plan to gain supernatural powers through telekinesis. He believes sacrificing a virgin woman's head to Venkateswara's crown from Tirumala Temple will grant him this ability. Stavros hires Paresh, a Bombay-based burglar and smuggler to steal the crown from the Venkateswara Temple in Tirumala, offering him $1 million for the heist.

Meanwhile, Naveena, a non-resident Indian living in Bangkok, decides to visit her hometown, Tadepalligudem, after the death of her parents. She also plans to bring her paternal grandmother back to Bangkok. During her visit to Tirumala, she meets a taxi driver, Seenu, whose father is a guard at the Venkateswara temple. Seenu saves Naveena from thieves who are trying to cheat her, leading to a growing affection between them.

A young boy, abandoned near the Venkateswara Temple, is adopted by the temple's main priest and becomes close friends with Seenu. During her visit, Naveena photographs the temple and meets the priest and Seenu's father. At their invitation, she visits their home. Seenu develops feelings for Naveena but hesitates to express them due to their differing social status. He later saves her from a bear attack, further strengthening their bond. Naveena eventually returns to Bangkok, leaving Seenu with her contact details.

One day, Seenu's father falls ill and cannot report to the temple. On the same day, Paresh and his gang steal the temple's sacred crown and flee to Bangkok, unaware that the boy has witnessed the theft. Suspicion falls on Seenu's father, as he failed to inform higher authorities about his absence, leading to police questioning. During the investigation, police discover Paresh's visiting card with an address in Bangkok. Seenu and the boy accompany the police to Bangkok to track down the robbers. However, the gang kill the investigating officer, unbeknownst to Seenu. Roaming the streets, Seenu and the boy are detained by Bangkok police due to language barriers. Fortunately, Naveena recognizes the boy on television and intervenes, securing their release.

Determined to retrieve the crown, they begin searching for the missing police officer and infiltrate a club. Meanwhile, Stavros's accomplice betrays Paresh, attempting to kill him and take the crown. Paresh narrowly escapes with the crown and demands a higher payment. The boy spots Paresh from a distance and alerts Seenu. Together with Naveena, Seenu follows Paresh to an abandoned temple in Bangkok. Stavros's men capture Naveena and Paresh, bringing them to Stavros. Seenu and the boy launch a rescue attempt. When Stavros tries to harm the boy, Naveena intervenes and is injured. Seenu confronts Stavros but is initially unable to defeat him due to Stavros's supernatural powers. The boy, revealed to be an incarnation of Venkateswara, gives Seenu the Sudarsana Chakra. With the divine weapon, Seenu kills Stavros.

After the battle, the boy, as Venkateswara, heals everyone's wounds. In the end, Seenu marries Naveena, and the couple returns to the Venkateswara Temple to offer their prayers and seek his blessings.

== Cast ==
- Nagarjuna as Seenu
- Sridevi as Naveena
- Master Anilraj as Babu
- Paresh Rawal as Paresh
- Kota Srinivasa Rao as Satyananda Swamy
- Gummadi as Bhrigu Maharshi
- J. V. Somayajulu as Main Priest
- Arun Govil as Vishnu
- Yamuna as Mahalakshmi
- Sudhakar as Hanumanthu
- Dhir as Stavros
- Chang as Chang
- Sreedhar Surapaneni as Narayana
- S. Gopala Reddy as CBI Officer
- Peketi Sivaram as Traveller in Bangkok Airport
- Kallu Chidambaram as Hotel Boy
- Kadambari Kiran as Seenu's Friend
- Uttej as Bus Stand Coolie
- Suryakantam as Bamma
- Annapurna as Seenu's Mother
- Silk Smitha in item number

== Production ==
Producer C. Aswani Dutt revealed in an interview that the film's conception stemmed from two story ideas proposed by director Ram Gopal Varma. One of the ideas was Rangeela, which Varma intended to make with Nagarjuna in the role later played by Aamir Khan and Rajinikanth in the role portrayed by Jackie Shroff. However, Aswani Dutt, an ardent devotee of Venkateswara, opted for an action film infused with spiritual elements. He encouraged Varma to proceed with Govinda Govinda, blending elements of a thriller with divinity.

The film featured Nagarjuna and Sridevi in the lead roles, reuniting after their successful pairing in Aakhari Poratam (1988).

== Music ==
Govinda Govinda

Film score by Raj–Koti
- Released: 1994
- Genre: Soundtrack
- Length: 29:18
- Label: Supreme Music
- Producer: Raj–Koti

Raj–Koti chronology
Doragariki Dongapellam (1994)	Govinda Govinda (1994)	Hello Brother (1994)

The music for the film was composed by Raj–Koti. Audio soundtrack was released on Supreme Music label.

No.	Title	Lyrics	Singer(s)	Length
1.	"Amma Bramha Devudo"	Sirivennela	S. P. Balasubrahmanyam, Chitra, Malgudi Subha	6:47
2.	"Andama Anduma"	Sirivennela	S. P. Balasubrahmanyam, Chitra	5:22
3.	"Indira Mandira"	Veturi	S. P. Balasubrahmanyam, Chitra	5:18
4.	"O Naveena"	Veturi	S. P. Balasubrahmanyam, Chitra	5:42
5.	"Premante Idantu"	Sirivennela	S. P. Balasubrahmanyam, Chitra	5:50
Total length:				29:18

== Release and reception ==
During its production, Govinda Govinda garnered attention due to its high-profile team, including director Ram Gopal Varma, producer C. Aswani Dutt, and lead actors Nagarjuna and Sridevi. The media promoted the film as an ambitious project, further raising audience expectations. However, upon release, the film received mixed reviews, with some viewers expressing disappointment. Despite the reception, the music composed by Raj–Koti was a success, with the songs praised for their freshness and appeal.
