= Oka Chinna Family Story =

- Genre: Comedy drama
- Created by: Manasa Sharma; Mahesh Uppala
- Directed by: Mahesh Uppala
- Starring: Sangeeth Sobhan; Tulasi; Naresh Vijay Krishna; Simran Sharma
- Voices of: Manasa Sharma; Ratna Sagar
- Composer: PK Dandi
- Country of origin: India
- Original language: Telugu
- No. of seasons: 1
- No. of episodes: 5

Production
- Executive producer: Ramesh M
- Producer: Niharika Konidela
- Cinematography: Edurolu Raju
- Editor: Prawin Pudi
- Running time: 35–42 minutes
- Production company: Pink Elephant Pictures

Original release
- Network: ZEE5
- Release: 19 November 2021

Oka Chinna Family Story (transl. A small family's story) is an Indian Telugu-language comedy-drama web series created by Manasa Sharma and Mahesh Uppala and produced by Niharika Konidela. The series is directed by Mahesh Uppala and has an ensemble cast of Sangeeth Sobhan, Tulasi and Simran Sharma. It premiered on 19 November 2021 on ZEE5.

== Premise ==
Mahesh's small middle-class family is in for a cruel twist when his father, Haridas, bequeaths a huge debt of ₹25 lakhs. How the family attempts to negotiate through the difficulties comedically forms the rest of the story.

== Cast ==
- Sangeeth Sobhan as Mahesh
- Tulasi as Rukmini, Mahesh's mother
- Simran Sharma as Keerthi
- Prameela Rani as Mahesh's paternal grandmother
- Naresh as Haridas, Mahesh's father
- Rajeev Kanakala as Mahesh's maternal uncle
- Rupa Lakshmi as Keerthi's mother
- Getup Srinu as Agent Balu

== Episodes ==
Episode	Title	Directed by	Written by	Date of Broadcast
1	"House No. 9"	Mahesh Uppala	Manasa Sharma; Mahesh Uppala	November 19, 2021
2	"The First EMI"	Mahesh Uppala	Manasa Sharma; Mahesh Uppala	November 19, 2021
3	"Of the Money, by the Money, for the Money"	Mahesh Uppala	Manasa Sharma; Mahesh Uppala	November 19, 2021
4	"Ousting Days"	Mahesh Uppala	Manasa Sharma; Mahesh Uppala	November 19, 2021
5	"Truth or Dare?"	Mahesh Uppala	Manasa Sharma; Mahesh Uppala	November 19, 2021

== Soundtrack ==
All lyrics are written by Shreemani; all music is composed by PK Dandi.

Tracklisting
No.	Title	Singer(s)	Length
1.	"Haire Haire"	Sarath Santosh	3:59
2.	"Orey Mahesha" (Chorus: Sindhuja Srinivasan; Lakshmi Meghana)	Dhanunjay Seepana	2:49
3.	"Naa Gunde Jaaripoye" (Chorus: Pavani Vasa, Ashwini Chepuri)	PK Dandi	3:34

== Reception ==
The series was well received and garnered over 60 million views in the first 10 days. ZEE 5 declared it a super hit. Thadhagath Pathi of The Times of India gave a rating of 3.5 out of 5 and praised the performances of lead actors, screenplay and direction. He further stated that "Oka Chinna Family Story truly has the makings of a new-age comedy that doesn't resort to cringy dialogues for the sake of laughs. Don't miss it if you love light-hearted dramas". Eenadu mentioned that background score, Tulasi's acting and story are the positives and slow-paced narration is the negative of the series.
