= Aha! Naa Pellanta!! =

1987 film

- Poster
- Directed by: Jandhyala
- Screenplay by: Jandhyala
- Based on: Satyam Gaari Illu (novel) by Adivishnu
- Produced by: D. Ramanaidu
- Starring: Rajendra Prasad; Rajani
- Cinematography: S. Gopal Reddy
- Edited by: B Satyam
- Music by: Ramesh Naidu
- Production company: Suresh Productions
- Release date: 27 November 1987
- Running time: 147 minutes
- Country: India
- Language: Telugu
- Budget: ₹16 lakh
- Box office: est. ₹5 crore

Aha! Naa Pellanta!! (Note: Spelt as Ahana Pellanta on the CBFC certificate.) (transl. Yeah! It’s my wedding!!) is a 1987 Indian Telugu-language comedy drama film written and directed by Jandhyala, and produced by D. Ramanaidu under his banner Suresh Productions. The film stars Rajendra Prasad and Rajani while Kota Srinivasa Rao, Nutan Prasad, and Brahmanandam play supporting roles. The film has music composed by Ramesh Naidu. An adaptation of Adivishnu's novel Satyam Gaari Illu (transl. Mr. Satyam's House), the film's title is based on a song from the epic fantasy film Mayabazar (1957). The film released on 27 November 1987.

Aha! Naa Pellanta!! is considered one of the best comedy films of all time in Telugu cinema. Kota Srinivasa Rao's character as a miser and his mannerism "Naakenti?" (transl. What's in it for me?) became famous. Brahmanandam's role as 'Ara Gundu' received wide appreciation from both critics and audience and it became his breakthrough role.

Made on a budget of ₹16 lakh, the film grossed over ₹5 crore at the box office and became a blockbuster. Producer D. Ramanaidu mentioned that the profits from the film helped him in the establishment of Ramanaidu Studios. The film was remade in Kannada as Challenge Gopalakrishna (1990).

== Plot ==
Krishna Murthy, the spoiled son of industrialist Kasthuri Satyanarayana, leads a highly competitive relationship with his father. Raised in opulence following his mother's death during childbirth, Murthy is bound by a promise Satyanarayana made to his late wife: that Murthy's eventual marriage must carry the full approval of both families unlike their wedding. While attending a friend's wedding, Murthy meets Padma and falls in love with her. Upon learning of his son's affection, Satyanarayana reveals that Padma is the daughter of Lakshmipati, a notorious miser residing in a neighbouring village. Determined to prove himself, Murthy wagers with his father that he can convince Lakshmipati to accept him as a son-in-law without relying on his family's wealth.

Murthy travels to Lakshmipati's village, rents a room in the adjoining house of neighbour Subba Rao, and meets Aragundu, Lakshmipati's long-suffering bonded labour. To win Lakshmipati's favour, Murthy poses as the head of a miser organisation and adopts extreme thriftiness. Through a series of schemes, Murthy deters other prospective suitors for Padma, whom Lakshmipati routinely manipulates with suicide threats, and helps Lakshmipati's son, Sundaram, who is in love with Subba Rao's sister, Sita.

Murthy offers to cover Sita's dowry to prevent Lakshmipati from tormenting her. Meanwhile, Satyanarayana arrives under the guise of seeking a business partnership with Lakshmipati to secretly sabotage Murthy's plan. On the intended wedding day, Lakshmipati cancels the proceedings on the grounds that the dowry was unpaid, assaulting Murthy in the process and drawing Satyanarayana's wrath.

Refusing to yield, Murthy collaborates with Aragundu, who has resigned from Lakshmipati's service, and orchestrates a scheme where several suitors, starting with Kukkuteshwara Rao, offer increasing amounts of "reverse dowry" to marry Padma. Tempted by greed, Lakshmipati accepts offers from four different suitors simultaneously. On the day of the wedding, all four grooms arrive and confront Lakshmipati for deception. Padma and her mother severely rebuke Lakshmipati for treating his family as financial commodities, with his wife sarcastically offering to commit suicide so he can sell their bodies for medical research.

Realising the consequence of his extreme avarice, a reformed Lakshmipati asks the suitors to select a worthy husband for Padma. The grooms unanimously choose Murthy. Satyanarayana discloses his true identity, concedes the wager to his son, and approves the union.

An epilogue notes that Lakshmipati eventually donated his wealth to charity before passing away peacefully, while Murthy and Padma had a son who inherited his grandfather's miserly tendencies.

== Cast ==
- Rajendra Prasad as Krishna Murthy
- Rajani as Padma
- Kota Srinivasa Rao as Lakshmipati
- Nutan Prasad as Satyanarayana
- Rallapalli as Appanna
- Bramhanandam as Govindu a.k.a. Ara Gundu
- Suthi Veerabhadra Rao as Collector Venkat Rao
- Suthi Velu as Pinaasi Sangham Head
- Subhalekha Sudhakar as Kukkuteswara Rao
- Babu Mohan as a member of RTC bus union
- Vidyasagar as Subba Rao
- Gundu Hanumantha Rao as Bridegroom's father
- Ashok Kumar as Kaviraju, Hotel manager
- Chitti Babu as Chitti, Krishna Murthy's mate
- Jenny as Hotel server
- Telangana Shakuntala as Hostel warden
- Sumithra as Rajyam
- Dubbing Janaki as Janaki
- Sandhya as Sita
- Jhansi
- Vishwas as Sundaram
- Kuyili as a special appearance as jogging girl
- Savitri as a special appearance as Sasirekha from Mayabazar in the song "Aha Na Pellanta"
- S. V. Ranga Rao as a special appearance as Ghatotkacha from Mayabazar in the song "Aha Na Pellanta"

== Soundtrack ==
Music composed by Ramesh Naidu. Music released on AVM Audio Company.

| S.No | Song title | Lyrics | Singers | length |
|---|---|---|---|---|
| 1 | "Thikkana Padinadi" | Jonnavithhula Ramalingeswara Rao | S. P. Balasubrahmanyam | 5:05 |
| 2 | "Kasthuri Rangayya" | M. R. S. Sastry | S. P. Balasubrahmanyam, P. Susheela | 3:54 |
| 3 | "Idi Srungara" | Veturi | S. P. Balasubrahmanyam, Vani Jayaram | 5:45 |
| 4 | "Peenasi Aina" | Jonnavithhula Ramalingeswara Rao | S. P. Balasubrahmanyam | 3:46 |
| 5 | "Swagatham" | Veturi | Mano, Vani Jayaram | 3:29 |
| 6 | "Aha Na Pellanta" | Ghantasala | P. Susheela, Ghantasala | 2:33 |

== Reception ==
Griddaluru Gopalrao of Zamin Ryot, writing his review on 4 December 1987, appreciated the way Jandhyala imbibed humour in the film's dialogues, "Though the comedy scenes are far from reality at times, they are very close in making the audience laugh [sic]," Gopalrao added.

== Legacy ==
Jahnavi Reddy of The News Minute, wrote that the film is noted for its dialogues and unique insults, which came to be used commonly in conversations. "While more recent films and their dialogues are frequently woven into conversations, there has been a big change in the kind of Telugu used in these popular dialogue," she added.
