= Sahasame Naa Oopiri =

1989 Indian Telugu film by Vijaya Nirmala

- Directed by: Vijaya Nirmala
- Written by: Tripuraneni Maharathi (Dialogues)
- Screenplay by: Vijaya Nirmala
- Story by: P. Chandrasekhara Reddy
- Produced by: S. Ramanand
- Starring: Krishna; Vijaya Nirmala; Naresh; Vani Viswanath
- Cinematography: Lakshman Gore
- Edited by: Adurthi Haranath
- Music by: Vidyasagar
- Production company: Sri Vijaya Krishna Movies
- Release date: 25 May 1989
- Country: India
- Language: Telugu

Sahasame Naa Oopiri (transl. Adventure is my breath) is a 1989 Indian Telugu satirical crime film based on the murder of the political leader Vangaveeti Mohana Ranga. The film directed by Vijaya Nirmala features Krishna alongside herself, Naresh, Vani Viswanath and Gummadi in the lead roles. Vijaya Nirmala also wrote the screenplay for a story by P. Chandrasekhara Reddy while Tripuraneni Maharathi penned the dialogues. Vidyasagar scored and composed the film's soundtrack while Adurthi Haranath edited the film and Lakshman Gore handled the cinematography.

== Cast ==
- Krishna as Prathap
- Vijaya Nirmala as Doctor
- Naresh
- Vani Viswanath
- Gummadi
- Giri Babu
- Ranganath
- Kota Srinivasa Rao
- Rajesh as Rapist
- Bob Christo
- Radha Ravi as Karthi
- Tyagaraju
- Pradeep Shakthi
- J. V. Ramana Murthy
- Mada
- Dham
- K. K. Sharma
- Rajyalakshmi
- Sri Lakshmi as Nurse
- Rajitha
- Suryakantham
- Pandari Bai

== Release ==
The film was released on 25 May 1989. It was released when the cold war between Krishna and actor-politician and the then Chief Minister of Andhra Pradesh, NTR, reached its peak. The film emphasised on how NTR might have played a role in the brutal murder of the then rising political leader Vangaveeti Mohana Ranga as alleged by a few newspapers and the latter's political party at that time. Hence, the film garnered generally mixed reviews. Nevertheless, the film turned out to be a money spinner at the box office and ended up as a commercially safe venture. The film had a direct run of 50 days in a few centres, with 4 of them being from the Ceded region which was surprisingly high for a Krishna film and 100 days run in Guntur.
