= Nandi Award for Best Cinematographer =

Indian film award

The Nandi Award for Best Cinematographer winners was instituted in 1977. This is a list of the winners of the award over the years and the films they have won for.

Year	Cinematographer	Film
2016	Sameer Reddy	Sathamanam Bhavati
2015	K. K. Senthil Kumar	Baahubali: The Beginning
2014	Sai Sriram	Ala Ela
2013	S. Murali Mohan Reddy	Kamalatho Naa Prayanam
2012	K. K. Senthil Kumar	Eega
2011	P. R. K. Raju	Sri Rama Rajyam
2010	Prasad Murella	Namo Venkatesa
2009	N. Sudhakar Reddy	Amaravathi
2008	Chota K. Naidu	Kotha Bangaru Lokam
2007	C. Ramprasad	Munna
2006	Vijay C. Kumar	Godavari
2005	P. R. K. Raju	Radha Gopalam
2004	Chota K. Naidu	Anji
2003	Sekhar V. Joseph	Okkadu
2002	Jayanan Vincent	Takkari Donga
2001	Rasool Ellore	Nuvvu Nenu
2000	Ashok Kumar	Sri Sai Mahima
1999	Venkata Prasad	Prema Katha
1998	Jayanan Vincent	Premante Idera
1997	A. Vincent	Annamayya
1996	Vaasu	Maina
1995	K. Ravindra Babu	Dharma Chakram
1994	S. Gopal Reddy	Hello Brother
1993	Rasool Ellore	Gaayam
1992	K. C. Diwakar	Laati
1991	S. Gopal Reddy	Kshana Kshanam
1990	Madhu Ambat	Hrudayanjali
1989	P. C. Sriram	Geethanjali
1988	P.S. Prakash	Prema
1987	V. S. R. Swamy	Viswanatha Nayakudu
1986	Balu Mahendra	Nireekshana
1985	Srihari Anumolu	Mayuri
1984	P. Bhaskar Rao	Suvarna Sundari
1983	S. Gopal Reddy	Ananda Bhairavi
1982	Selva Raj	Meghasandesam
1981	Kasturi	Saptapadi
1980	No Award	No Award
1979	P. S. Nivas	Nimajjanam
1978	Balu Mahendra	Manavoori Pandavulu
1977	A. Vincent	Adavi Ramudu
