= S. Gopal Reddy =

Indian cinematographer

- Born: 4 July 1951 (age 75); Krishna district, Andhra Pradesh, India
- Occupations: Cinematographer; director
- Spouse: Michaela Reddy

S. Gopal Reddy is an Indian cinematographer, screenwriter, director and producer, known for his works in Telugu and Hindi. He is mainly known for his collaborations with Jandhyala, B. Gopal, Ram Gopal Varma, and K. Raghavendra Rao. In 1991, he co-produced the blockbuster Kshana Kshanam, under his production house Durga Arts. He has received two Filmfare Best Cinematographer Award (South) for Varsham and Sri Ramadasu in 2004 and 2006 respectively.

== Personal life ==
He is married to Rasool Ellore's sister, Michaela, and has a son and daughter (Sundeep and Sandhya). Sundeep, his son, is also a professional cinematographer.

== Filmography ==
List of S. Gopal Reddy film credits as director, producer, or writer
Year	Title	Director	Writer	Producer	Notes
1991	Kshana Kshanam	No	No	Presenter	Also cinematographer
1994	Hello Brother	No	No	Presenter	Also cinematographer
1997	Dongaata	No	No	Presenter	Also cinematographer
1999	Maa Balaji	No	No	Yes	
2003	Ninne Ishtapaddanu	No	No	Presenter	Also cinematographer
2004	Deewaar	No	Story	No	Hindi film
2004	Naa Autograph	Yes	No	No	
2006	Rakhi	No	No	Presenter	Also cinematographer
2027	Varanasi †	No	No	Presenter	

List of S. Gopal Reddy film credits as cinematographer
Year	Title	Notes
1980	Samsara Bandham	
1980	Gopala Rao Gari Ammayi	
1981	Kodeeswaran Magal	Tamil film
1981	Mudda Mandaram	
1982	Nalugu Stambhalata	
1983	Rendu Jella Seetha	
1983	Nelavanka	
1983	Mujhe Insaaf Chahiye	Hindi film
1983	Ananda Bhairavi	Simultaneously shot in Kannada
1983	Moodu Mullu	
1983	Amarajeevi	
1984	Srivariki Premalekha	
1984	Jada Gantalu	
1984	Inquilaab	Hindi film
1984	Kanchana Ganga	
1984	Kathanayakudu	
1985	Siksha	
1985	Babai Abbai	
1986	Dilwaala	Hindi film
1986	Prathidhwani	
1986	Aakhree Raasta	Hindi film
1986	Jailu Pakshi	
1987	Aha Naa Pellanta	
1987	Satyagraham	
1987	Collector Gari Abbai	
1987	Ramu	
1988	Khatron Ke Khiladi	Hindi film
1988	Raktha Tilakam	
1989	Kanoon Apna Apna	Hindi film
1989	Dhruva Nakshatram	
1989	Vijay	
1989	State Rowdy	
1989	Siva	
1990	Aggiramudu	
1990	Shiva	Hindi film
1991	Coolie No. 1	
1991	Kshana Kshanam	
1992	Peddarikam	
1993	Muta Mestri	
1993	Nippu Ravva	
1994	Govinda Govinda	
1994	Hello Brother	
1994	Criminal	Simultaneously shot in Hindi
1995	Gharana Bullodu	
1995	Sisindri	
1996	Intlo Illalu Vantintlo Priyuralu	
1996	Akkada Ammayi Ikkada Abbayi	
1997	Chinnabbayi	
1997	Dongaata	
1998	Kanyadhanam	
1999	Sooryavansham	Hindi film
1999	Kala Chakra	Oriya film
2001	Devi Putrudu	
2001	Prematho Raa	
2001	Akasa Veedhilo	
2001	Manasantha Nuvve	
2002	Santosham	
2002	Nee Sneham	
2003	Ninne Ishtapaddanu	
2004	Varsham	
2004	Meri Biwi Ka Jawaab Nahin	Hindi film
2004	Naa Autograph	Also director
2006	Sri Ramadasu	
2006	Rakhi	
2007	Don	
2010	Jhummandi Naadam	
2011	Vastadu Naa Raju	
2012	Tuneega Tuneega	
2012	Shirdi Sai	
2013	Jagadguru Adi Shankara	
2014	Drushyam	
2016	Siddhartha	
2017	Om Namo Venkatesaya	

As Technician

- Mahakavi Kshetrayya (1976) (operatorative cameraman)
- Bhakta Kannappa (1976) (operative cameraman)
- Alluri Seetarama Raju (1974) (operative cameraman)
- Andala Ramudu (1973) (operative cameraman)
- Bhakta Tukaram (1973) (operative cameraman)
- Mosagallaku Mosagadu (1971) (Operative cameraman)

== Awards ==
Filmfare Awards South

- Best Cinematographer (2004) – Varsham
- Best Cinematographer (2006) – Sri Ramadasu

Nandi Awards

- Nandi Award for Best Cinematographer for Ananda Bhairavi – 1983
- Nandi Award for Best Cinematographer for Kshana Kshanam – 1991
- Nandi Award for Best Cinematographer for Hello Brother – 1994
