= Potturi Vijayalakshmi =

Indian writer

- Born: 18 July 1953 (age 72); Yajali, Guntur district, Andhra Pradesh, India
- Occupation: Writer
- Years active: 1982 – present
- Spouse: P V Siva Rao

Potturi Vijayalakshmi is a Telugu writer well known for her humorous short stories.

== Biography ==
Potturi Vijayalakshmi was born in Yajali village in Guntur district, Andhra Pradesh to Ms. Valluri Satyavaani and Mr. Valluri Venkata Krishna Murthy. She married Mr. P V Siva Rao in 1970 and has two children Sireesha and Praveen Kumar. She currently lives in Hyderabad, Andhra Pradesh with her family.

Vijayalakshmi penned around 250 short stories and 14 novels in Telugu language. Her first novel, "Premalekha", was made into a movie directed by Jandhyala. She also worked at All India Radio. She is well known for her humorous short stories which appeared in many Telugu weeklies like Eenadu Aadivaaram, Chatura and Andhra Jyothi, to name a few. These short stories, along with her other stories, were compiled into books of Telugu short stories.

== Publications ==
Books of Telugu short stories written by Vijayalakshmi:

- Hasya Kathalu (Stories from this book were published in Eenadu Aadivaram)
- Chandrahaaram
- Maa inti Ramayanam
- Aanandame Andam
- Premalekha
- Pottoori vijayalakshmi haasya kadhalu
- Aatmakadha
- Koncham ishtam koncham kashtam
- Sanmaanam.
- Script sidhhamgaa vundi - cinimaa tiyyandi
- Pottoori vijayalakshmi haasya kadhalu revised edition
- Poorvi
- Jnaapakaala Jaavali

== Awards and recognitions ==
- Potti Sreeramulu Telugu University Trust Award, 2007
- Sri Krishna Mohan Rao Memorial Award, 2007
- SeshaaRatnam Memorial Award, 2009
- Gruha lakshmi swarna mananam, 2012
- Apuroopa haasya prasaaram, 2015
- Munimaanikyam Haasya puraskaaram, 2015
- Delhi Telugu academy udyog BHAARAT PURASKAAR, 2016
- Bhanumati puraskaaram
- Saahitee siromani title by Kavali
- Telugu Sahiti.

* Vijay Bhavna ugadi puraskaram by 
Vijayanagaram in  2019.

- Hasya kalaapoorna title by

Vijaya Bhavana association vijayanagaram in 2019.

- Suseela Narayan Reddy award

 In 2021.
