= Poornima (Telugu actress) =

Indian actress

- Born: Chennai, Tamil Nadu, India
- Occupation: Actress
- Years active: 1980–1988; 2006-present

Poornima, also known as Poornima Rao, is an Indian actress who starred in many Telugu, Tamil, Kannada and Malayalam films in the early and mid-1980s. She made her film debut with the 1981 film Mudda Mandaram.

== Filmography ==
=== Telugu ===
Year	Film	Role	Notes
1981	Mudda Mandaram	Durga	Nominated-Filmfare Award for Best Actress – Telugu
1982	Nalugu Stambhalata		
1982	Intlo Ramayya Veedhilo Krishnayya		
1982	Manishiko Charithra		
1982	Tarangini		
1983	Puttadi Bomma		
1983	Palletoori Monagadu		
1983	Gaaju Bommalu		
1983	Manishiki Maro Peru		
1983	Mayagadu	Mallika and her mother	Double role
1983	Poratam		
1983	Konte Kodallu		
1983	Dharma Poratam	Latha	
1984	Srivariki Premalekha	Swarna	Nominated-Filmfare Award for Best Actress – Telugu
1984	Kotha Dampathulu		
1985	Maa Pallelo Gopaludu		
1985	Agni Parvatam		
1985	Donga		
1985	Muchataga Mugguru		
1986	Kutra		
1986	Mama Kodallu Saval		
1986	Krishna Garadi		
1986	Aadapaduchu		
1987	Akshintalu		
1987	Pellillo Pellilu		
1987	Lawyer Bharathi Devi		
1987	Vijetha Vikram	Gowri	
1987	Rotation Chakravarthy	Swarajyam	
1987	Gundamma Gari Krishnulu		
1987	Makutamleni Maharaju		
1988	Chilipi Dampatulu		
1988	Maa Inti Maharaju		
1988	Bandipotu	Shanti	
1989	Preminchi Choodu	Jyothi	
2006	Aadi Lakshmi		
2011	Graduate		
2014	Undile Machi Kalam Mundu Munduna		
2015	Andhra Pori		
2017	Lie		

=== Tamil: Credited as Poornima/Poornima Rao ===
Year	Film	Role	Notes
1980	Saranam Ayyappa		
1981	Kilinjalgal	Usha, Julie's friend (credited as Sudha)	
1982	Magane Magane		
1983	Oru Pullanguzhal Aduppuppthugirathu		
1984	Dhavani Kanavugal		
1985	Unnai Vidamatten		
1985	Vilange Meen		
1985	Porutham		
1989	Thangachi Kalyanam		

=== Malayalam: Credited as Sudha ===
Year	Title	Role	Notes
1980	Ilakkangal	Amminikutty	
1982	Enthino Pookunna Pookkal	Sumathi	
1982	Ruby My Darling		
1982	Vaarikuzhi		
1984	Swantham Sarika		
1984	Sandhya Mayangum Neram	Shanthi	

=== Kannada: Credited as Poornima ===
Year	Title	Role	Notes
1984	Maryade Mahalu		
1984	Prema Sakshi		
1984	Marali Goodige		
1986	Beegara Pandya		
