= Nandi Award for Best Director =

Indian film award

The Nandi Award for Best Director the Award was first given in 1981. This is a list of the recipients of the award over the years and the films they won for.

== List ==
Year	Director	Film	Ref
1981	Bharathiraja	Seethakoka Chiluka	
1982	U. Visweswar Rao	Keerthi Kantha Kanakam	
1983	Jandhyala	Ananda Bhairavi	
1984	K. Raghavendra Rao	Bobbili Brahmanna	
1985	Singeetam Srinivas Rao	Mayuri	
1986	K. Viswanath	Swati Mutyam	
1987	K. Viswanath	Srutilayalu	
1988	Suresh Krishna	Prema	
1989	Ram Gopal Varma	Siva	
1990	Kranthi Kumar	Seetharamaiah Gari Manavaralu	
1991	Ram Gopal Varma	Kshana Kshanam	
1992	C. Umamaheswara Rao	Ankuram	
1993	K. Raghavendra Rao	Allari Priyudu	
1994	Singeetam Srinivas Rao	Bhairava Dweepam	
1995	K. Raghavendra Rao	Pelli Sandadi	
1996	Gangaraju Gunnam	Little Soldiers	
1997	K. Raghavendra Rao	Annamayya	
1998	Dasari Narayana Rao	Kante Koothurne Kanu	
1999	Ram Gopal Varma	Prema Katha	
2000	S.V. Krishna Reddy	Sakutumba Saparivara Sametam	
2001	Teja	Nuvvu Nenu	
2002	Krishna Vamsi	Khadgam	
2003	Gunasekhar	Okkadu	
2004	Sekhar Kammula	Anand	
2005	Krishna Vamsi	Chakram	
2006	Sekhar Kammula	Godavari	
2007	Krishna Vamsi	Chandamama	
2008	Radhakrishna Jagarlamudi	Gamyam	
2009	S. S. Rajamouli	Magadheera	
2010	Sunil Kumar Reddy	Ganga Putrulu	
2011	N. Shankar	Jai Bolo Telangana	
2012	S. S. Rajamouli	Eega	
2013	Daya Kodavaganti	Alias Janaki	
2014	Boyapati Srinu	Legend	
2015	S. S. Rajamouli	Baahubali: The Beginning	
2016	Satish Vegesna	Sathamanam Bhavati	

=== Most won ===
Most won
Artist	Wins
K. Raghavendra Rao	4
Ram Gopal Varma	3
Krishna Vamsi	3
S. S. Rajamouli	3
K. Viswanath	2
Singeetam Srinivasa Rao	2
Sekhar Kammula	2

== See also ==
- Nandi Awards
