= Mudda Mandaram =

Muddamandaram
- Theatrical release poster
- Directed by: Jandhyala
- Written by: Jandhyala
- Produced by: Ranjith; Prasanth
- Starring: Poornima; Pradeep Kondiparthi; Annapurna; Suthi Velu
- Cinematography: S. Gopal Reddy
- Edited by: G. G. Krishna Rao
- Music by: Ramesh Naidu
- Release date: 11 September 1981
- Country: India
- Language: Telugu

Muddamandaram is a 1981 Telugu-language drama film, written and directed by Jandhyala. It is the debut film for both the leading actors Poornima and Pradeep Kondiparthi and Suthi Velu. This movie was inspired by the 1971 French movie Friends.

== Plot ==
Pradeep is son of a millionaire. He returns from America after his studies. He falls in love with a simple flower seller, Poornima. He marries her against the wishes of his father Shankar. How the young lovers survived facing the reality of life is the rest of the story.

== Cast ==
- Poornima as Durga
- Pradeep Kondiparthi as Pradeep
- Sundara Laxmi
- Shankar
- Annapurna
- Narasinga Rao
- Tulasi
- Suthi Velu

== Soundtrack ==
- "Aliveni Aanimutyama' (Singers: S. P. Balasubrahmanyam, S. Janaki)
- "Jo Lali Jo Lali Nayana Okate Rendya Uyyala" (Singer: S. P. Balasubrahmanyam)
- "Jonnachelon Junnu" (Singers: S. P. Balasubrahmanyam, S. Janaki)
- "Mandaaram Mudda Mandaaram Mudduke Muddoche Mandaram" (Singer: S. P. Balasubrahmanyam)
- "Naa Sholapur Cheppulu" (Singer: Jitmohan Mitra)
- "Neelalu Kaarenaa Kaalaalu" (Singers: S. P. Balasubrahmanyam, S. Janaki)
- "Sreerastu Subhamastu Kalyanamastu" (Singers: S. P. Balasubrahmanyam, S. Janaki)
- "Kalakanthi Kolakullo" (Singers: S. P. Balasubrahmanyam, S. Janaki)
- "Aa Rendu Dondapanu Pedavullo" (Singers: S. P. Balasubrahmanyam, S. Janaki)

== Box office ==
- The film ran for more than 100 days in about 25 centres.
