= Jandhyala =

Indian film director, screenwriter, playwright

Jandhyala‌
- Born: Jandhyala Subrahmanya Sastry; 14 January 1951; Narsapuram, Madras State, India (present-day Andhra Pradesh)
- Died: 19 June 2001 (aged 50); Hyderabad, Andhra Pradesh, India (present-day Telangana)
- Other name: Hasya Brahma
- Occupations: Film director; screenwriter; playwright; actor

Jandhyala Subrahmanya Sastry (14 January 1951 – 19 June 2001), known mononymously as Jandhyala, was an Indian film director, screenwriter, and playwright known for his work in Telugu cinema and theatre. Popularly referred to as "Hasya Brahma" (transl. "Brahma of comedy"), Jandhyala is celebrated for his exceptional contributions to comedy films. In a career spanning twenty five years, he directed more than 40 films and wrote dialogues for over 300 films.

Jandhyala's interest in theatre began at a young age, and during his college years, he wrote several successful plays. He entered the film industry in 1976 and quickly established himself as a versatile writer. He penned commercial blockbusters such as Adavi Ramudu (1977), and Vetagadu (1979) as well as critically acclaimed films like Siri Siri Muvva (1976), and Sankarabharanam (1980). His skill in crafting sharp dialogues and creating engaging characters earned him widespread recognition.

Jandhyala transitioned to directing, and helmed several notable films such as Ananda Bhairavi (1983), Srivariki Premalekha (1984), Chantabbai (1986), Padamati Sandhya Ragam (1987), Aha Naa Pellanta! (1987), Vivaha Bhojanambu (1988), Choopulu Kalasina Subhavela (1988), and Jayammu Nischayammu Raa (1989). Though best known for his contributions to comedy, his directorial works reflect versatility, spanning multiple genres. Jandhyala was also instrumental in launching the careers of actors like Naresh, Dharmavarapu Subramanyam, and Suthi Velu and played a key role in shaping the careers of actors such as Brahmanandam, Rajendra Prasad, and Kota Srinivasa Rao.

In addition to directing, Jandhyala continued to write for other filmmakers. He contributed dialogues to National Award-winning films such as Saptapadi (1981), Seethakoka Chilaka (1981), Sagara Sangamam (1983), and Swathi Kiranam (1992). He also wrote for other notable films like Nireekshana (1986), Aakhari Poratam (1988), Jagadeka Veerudu Athiloka Sundari (1990), and Aditya 369 (1991). Throughout his career, he received several accolades, including three Nandi Awards—one each for Best Director, Best Story Writer, and Best Dialogue Writer—and a Filmfare Award for Best Director – Telugu.

== Early life ==
Jandhyala Veera Venkata Durga Siva Subrahmanya Sastry, known mononymously as Jandhyala, was born on 14 January 1951 in Narasapuram, West Godavari district, Andhra Pradesh into a middle-class family. He completed his Bachelor of Commerce (B.Com.) in SRR & CVR Govt. Degree College in Vijayawada. C. Aswini Dutt, who would later go on to become a noted producer, was Jandhyala's childhood friend. They were classmates from fourth standard through their graduation and also lived in neighbouring houses.

From a young age, Jandhyala was deeply involved in theatre, acting as a child artist in the drama troupe of Vinnakota Ramanna Pantulu. His passion continued during his college years, where he won the Best Actor prize for his performance in Tasmath Jagratha at an inter-university drama competition in 1969. At the age of 12, he published his first short story in Andhra Prabha. Influenced by plays like Kanyasulkam and Keerthi Seshulu, he wrote his first play, Jeevana Jyothi. His subsequent plays, including Ek Din Ka Sultan, Gundelu Marchabadunu, O Cheekati Ratri, and Mandodari Mahila Mandali, gained popularity. Ek Din Ka Sultan earned him accolades and was translated into several languages, while his social play Sandhyaraagamlo Sankhaaraavam was particularly acclaimed and marked his entry into the film industry.

== Career ==
=== Entry into film industry ===
In 1974, Jandhyala moved to Madras (now Chennai) to stage his acclaimed play Sandhyaraagamlo Sankhaaraavam. Impressed by his work, veteran filmmaker B. N. Reddi signed him to adapt the Beena Devi novel O Punya Bhoomi Kallu Theru into a film. However, the project did not materialise due to Reddi's ill health.

Subsequently, A. Ananda Mohan signed Jandhyala for Pelli Kani Pelli, and V. Hanuman Prasad engaged him for Devudu Chesina Bommalu. His first released film was Devudu Chesina Bommalu (1976), followed by Pelli Kani Pelli (1977). Jandhyala gained recognition as a writer with K. Viswanath's Siri Siri Muvva (1976), which was a major hit. He quickly established himself as a versatile writer, contributing to both commercial hits like Adavi Ramudu (1977), and Vetagadu (1979) and critically acclaimed films such as Seetamalakshmi (1976) and Sankarabharanam (1980). He was a very busy writer from 1976–1981 and wrote nearly 200 films in those five years. He worked in various roles as a story writer, screenplay writer, and dialogue writer. He was working on four or five films at any given time during that period.

=== Directorial career ===
Jandhyala made his directorial debut with Mudda Mandaram in 1981. While directing his films, he continued to write for other directors. Over the years, he directed a total of 42 films and wrote over 150 films from 1981 to 2001. After Mudda Mandaram, he directed the romantic drama Nalugu Stambhalata (1982) and the Telugu-Kannada bilingual dance film Ananda Bhairavi (1983), which was showcased at the International Film Festival of India and won Nandi Awards for Best Feature Film, Best Direction, and Best Story.

Jandhyala's directorial success continued with comedy dramas such as Rendu Jella Sita (1983), Srivariki Premalekha, (1984), Rendu Rellu Aaru (1986), Chantabbai (1986), Padamati Sandhya Ragam (1987), Vivaha Bhojanambu (1988), Choopulu Kalasina Subhavela (1988). Padamati Sandhya Ragam received the Filmfare Award for Best Film – Telugu and the Nandi Award for Best Story Writer. Other films he directed during this time include a film on national integration called Nelavanka (1983), Amarajeevi (1983), and Seetharama Kalyanam (1986). The last film he directed was Vichitram (1998) which starred Ghazal Srinivas in the lead role.

=== Later career ===
In addition to his directorial achievements, Jandhyala wrote dialogues for several National Award-winning films, including Sankarabharanam (1980), Saptapadi (1981), Seethakoka Chiluka (1981), Sagara Sangamam (1983), and Swathi Kiranam (1992). His other significant writing credits include Sommokadidi Sokokadidi (1978), Nireekshana (1986), Aakhari Poratam (1988), Jagadeka Veerudu Athiloka Sundari (1990), and Aditya 369 (1991). Among his dialogue-writing work, he listed Sankarabharanam, Saptapadi, and Adavi Ramudu as his favourite films.

Throughout his 25-year film career, Jandhyala earned several accolades including three state Nandi Awards and a Filmfare Award South. He frequently collaborated with directors K. Raghavendra Rao and K. Viswanath, contributing to many successful films. E. V. V. Satyanarayana, who worked as Jandhyala's assistant director for 22 films over eight years, later became a prominent director himself.

Beyond films, Jandhyala wrote children's stories, and authored more than 27 stage and radio plays. He acted in numerous stage plays, was a popular television anchor, and occasionally served as a dubbing artist. His diverse contributions to Telugu cinema, theatre, and television have left a lasting impact on the industry.

== Death ==
Following a massive heart attack, he died on 19 June 2001, aged 50. He had completed his silver jubilee year in film industry.

== Filmmaking style ==
Jandhyala was renowned primarily for his work in comedy, but his directorial portfolio spans several genres. Notable films beyond comedy include the drama Nelavanka, the dance film Ananda Bhairavi, and romance films such as Amarajeevi and Seetha Rama Kalyanam.

Jandhyala had a distinct aversion to ribald comedy and preferred using simple, natural dialogues. He believed that conversations in films should reflect realistic scenarios that audiences could easily relate to and enjoy. According to A. Saye Sekhar of The Hindu, Jandhyala's comedic style involved "taking sensitive potshots at the doings of assorted nabobs, stuffed shirts in typical Telugu families, village footpads, miserable misers, secret polluters, tax evaders, preening lawyers, idiosyncratic doctors, oily accountants, defendants who got off too easily and celebrities who talked too much."

As a screenwriter, Jandhyala was known for his versatility. He contributed to a wide range of films, from commercial blockbusters like Adavi Ramudu and Vetagadu to critically acclaimed works such as Siri Siri Muvva and Sankarabharanam. His versatility extended across genres including action (Aakhari Poratam), fantasy (Jagadeka Veerudu Athiloka Sundari), science fiction (Aditya 369), and supernatural thrillers (Govinda Govinda). His films also explored classical art forms, evident in Siri Siri Muvva, Sankarabharanam, Sagara Sangamam, and Swathi Kiranam.

== Legacy ==
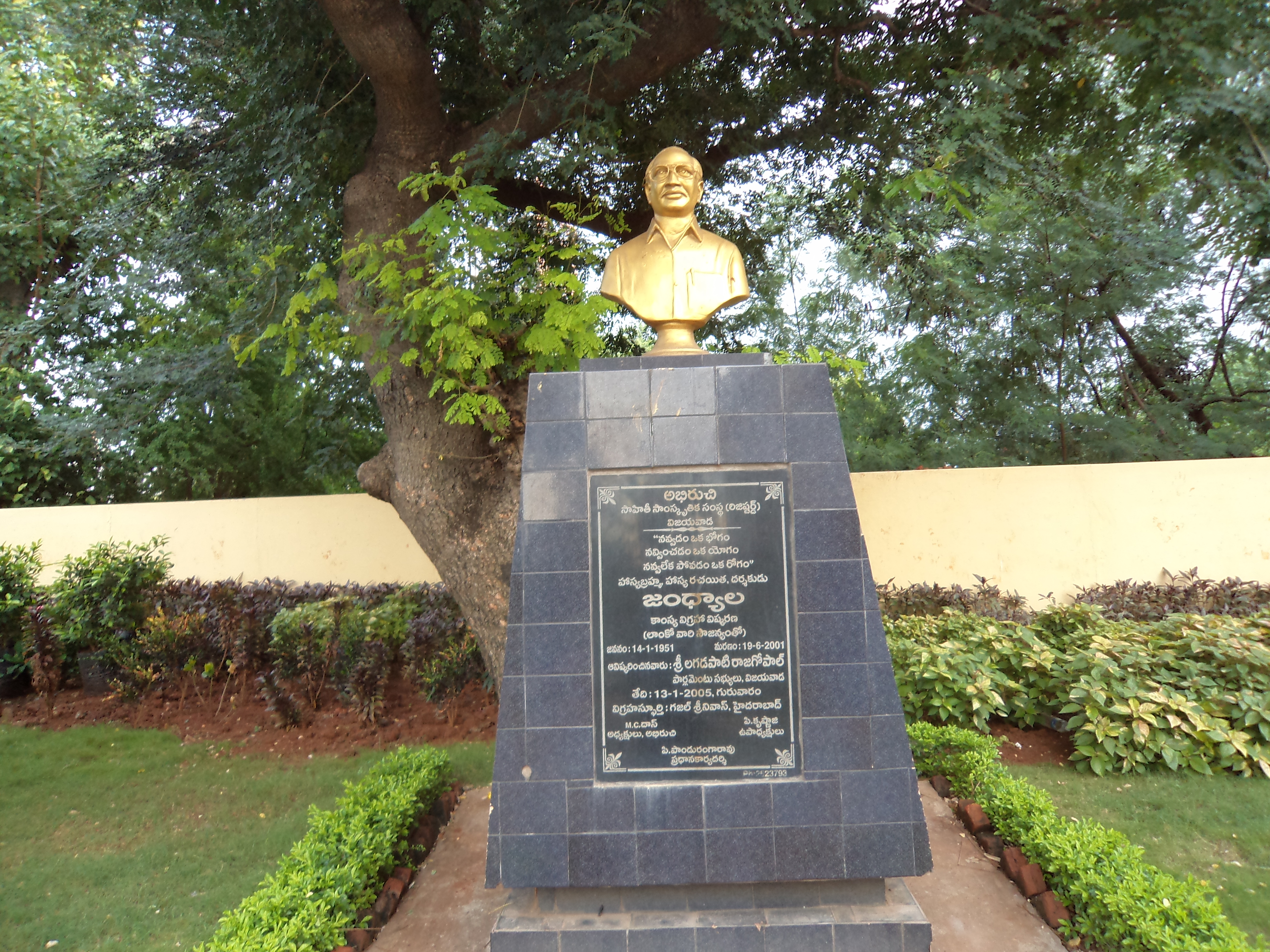
Bronze bust of Jandhyala at Tummalapalli Kalakshetram, Vijayawada

Jandhyala earned the moniker "Hasya Brahma" (transl. "Brahma of comedy") for his exceptional contributions to comedy films. He is celebrated as the 'King of Comedy in Tollywood' by The Hindu. His films, known for their clean entertainment and family-friendly content, established comedy as a significant genre in Telugu cinema. Before his influence, comedy often played a secondary role, with comedians typically relegated to sidekick positions. Jandhyala's success demonstrated that comedy could be a central, full-length subject in films. Among his acclaimed works, Aha Naa Pellanta! is regarded as one of the best comedy films in Telugu cinema.

Jandhyala introduced Naresh, Dharmavarapu Subramanyam, Suthi Velu to Telugu cinema. He also helped establish comic actors such as Rajendra Prasad, Brahmanandam, Kota Srinivasa Rao, Suthi Veerabhadra Rao, Gundu Hanumantha Rao, and Sri Lakshmi through his films.

His impact on the film industry is further underscored by the admiration of his peers. Brahmanandam regarded Jandhyala as the best comedy director he ever worked with. Noted screenwriter V. Vijayendra Prasad expressed his admiration for Jandhyala. Filmmaker Tharun Bhascker mentioned Jandhyala as one of the inspirations on his directorial sensibilities. Director and screenwriter Anil Ravipudi cited Jandhyala as the biggest inspiration in his career. Ravipudi stated, "I grew up watching Jandhyala films. I have watched video cassettes of all his films. He provided healthy comedy. I took inspiration from him to provide entertainment in all my films."

In January 2005, a bronze bust of Jandhyala was erected at Tummalapalli Kalakshetram in Vijayawada, honouring his contributions to the industry.

== Filmography ==
=== Director ===
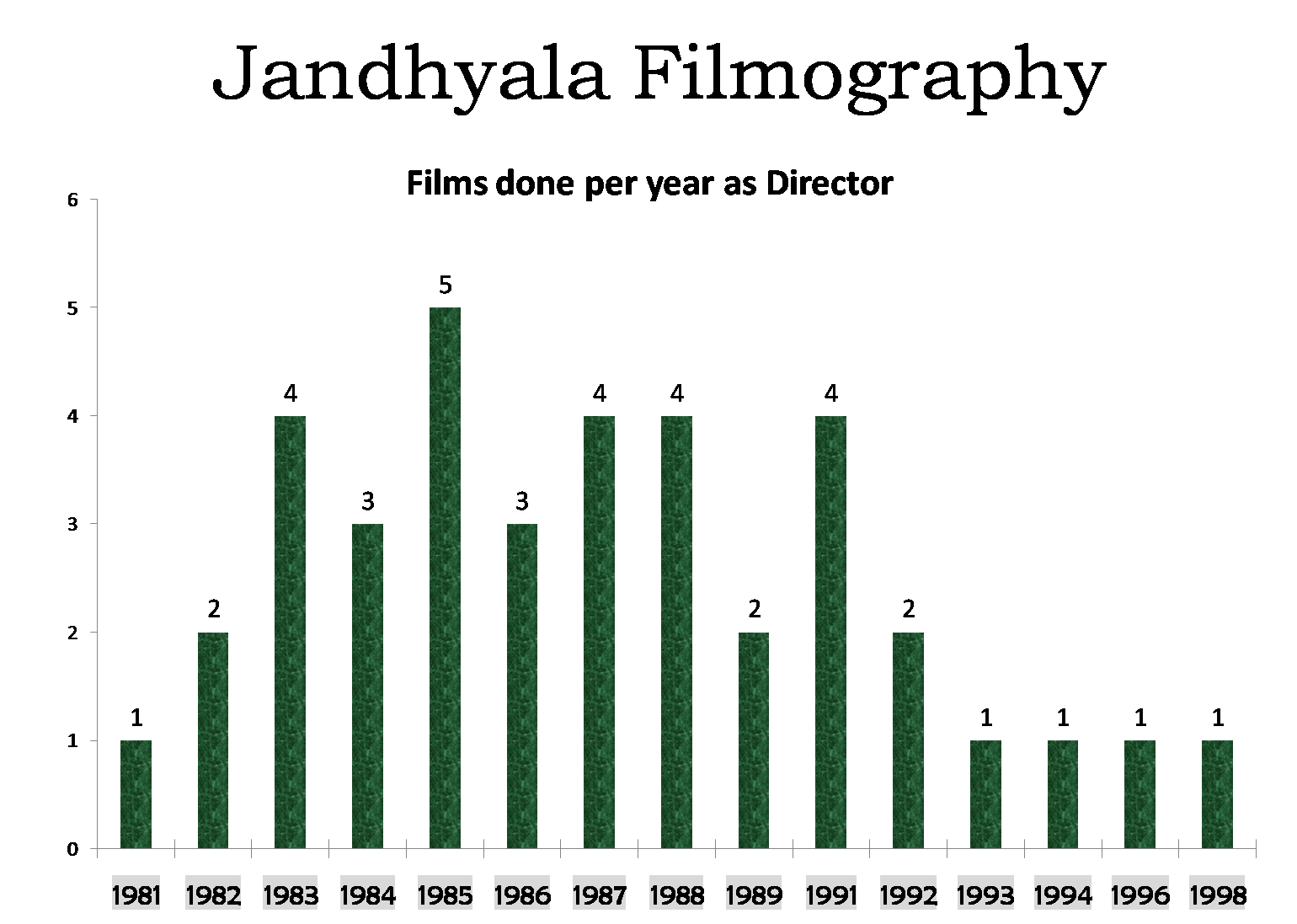
Filmography chart of the films directed per year by Jandhyala (click to expand)

| Year | Film | Notes |
|---|---|---|
| 1981 | Mudda Mandaram | |
| 1982 | Malle Pandiri | |
| 1982 | Nalugu Stambhalata | |
| 1983 | Nelavanka | |
| 1983 | Rendu Jella Sita | |
| 1983 | Amarajeevi | |
| 1983 | Moodu Mullu | |
| 1984 | Ananda Bhairavi | Simultaneously shot in Kannada |
| 1984 | Srivariki Premalekha | |
| 1984 | Rama Rao Gopal Rao | |
| 1985 | Puttadi Bomma | |
| 1985 | Babai Abbai | |
| 1985 | Srivari Sobhanam | |
| 1985 | Mogudu Pellalu | |
| 1985 | Muddula Manavaralu | |
| 1986 | Rendu Rella Aaru | |
| 1986 | Seeta Rama Kalyanam | |
| 1986 | Chantabbai | |
| 1987 | Padamati Sandhya Ragam | |
| 1987 | Raga Leela | |
| 1987 | Satyagraham | |
| 1987 | Aha Naa Pellanta | |
| 1988 | Chinni Krishnudu | |
| 1988 | Vivaha Bhojanambu | |
| 1988 | Neeku Naaku Pellanta | |
| 1988 | Choopulu Kalasina Subhavela | |
| 1989 | Hai Hai Nayaka | |
| 1989 | Jayammu Nischayammu Raa | |
| 1990 | Prema Zindabad | |
| 1991 | Ladies Special | |
| 1991 | Bava Bava Panneru | |
| 1991 | Prema Enta Madhuram | |
| 1991 | Vichitra Prema | |
| 1992 | Babai Hotel | |
| 1994 | Aa Aaa E Ee | |
| 1994 | Shhh. Gup Chup | |
| 1996 | Oho Naa Pellanta | |
| 1998 | Vichitram | |

=== Dialogue writer ===
- Siri Siri Muvva (1976)
- Adavi Ramudu (1977)
- Amara Deepam (1977)
- Seetamalakshmi (1978)
- Sommokadidi Sokokadidi (1979)
- Tayaramma Bangarayya (1979)
- Driver Ramudu (1979)
- Viyyala Vari Kayyalu (1979)
- Vetagadu (1979)
- Mande Gundelu (1979)
- Burripalem Bullodu (1979)
- Bhale Krishnudu (1980)
- Sankarabharanam (1980)
- Mama Allulla Saval (1980)
- Rowdy Ramudu Konte Krishnudu (1980)
- Subhodhayam (1980)
- Saptapadi (1981)
- Seethakoka Chilaka (1981)
- Talli Kodukula Anubandham (1982)
- Sagara Sangamam (1983)
- Vijetha (1985)
- Nireekshana (1986)
- Pasivadi Pranam (1987)
- Aakhari Poratam (1988)
- Jagadeka Veerudu Athiloka Sundari (1990)
- Minor Raja (1991)
- Aditya 369 (1991)
- Swathi Kiranam (1992)
- Aapadbandhavudu (1992)
- Abbayigaru (1993)
- Govinda Govinda (1994)
- Sri Sita Ramula Kalyanam Chootamu Raarandi (1998)

=== Actor ===
- Rendu Rellu Aaru (1986)
- Aapadbandhavudu (1992)

=== Dubbing artist ===
- Gandhi (1982) – Telugu dubbing for Roshan Seth as Jawaharlal Nehru
- Padamati Sandhyaragam (1987) – for Meer Abdulla who plays uncle
- Choopulu Kalasina Subhavela (1988) – for Sutti Veerabhadra Rao
- Donga Donga (1993) – Telugu version of Mani Ratnam's Thiruda Thiruda (for Salim Ghouse)
- Bharateeyudu (1996) – Telugu version of Indian (for Nedumudi Venu)
- Bhama Ne Satyabhama Ne (1996) – Telugu version of Avvai Shanmughi (for Gemini Ganesan)
- Iddaru (1997) – Telugu version of Iruvar (for Prakash Raj)
- Arunachalam (1997) – Telugu version of Arunachalam (for Visu)
- Merupu Kalalu (1997) – for Girish Karnad

=== Television ===
- Popula Pette (1997) – Writer and director

== Awards ==
Nandi Awards

- 1984, Best Director – Ananda Bhairavi
- 1987, Best Story Writer – Padamati Sandhya Ragam
- 1992, Best Dialogue Writer – Aapadbandhavudu

Filmfare Awards South

- 1984, Best Director – Telugu – Srivariki Premalekha
