= Chandu (director) =

Indian film director, producer, screenwriter

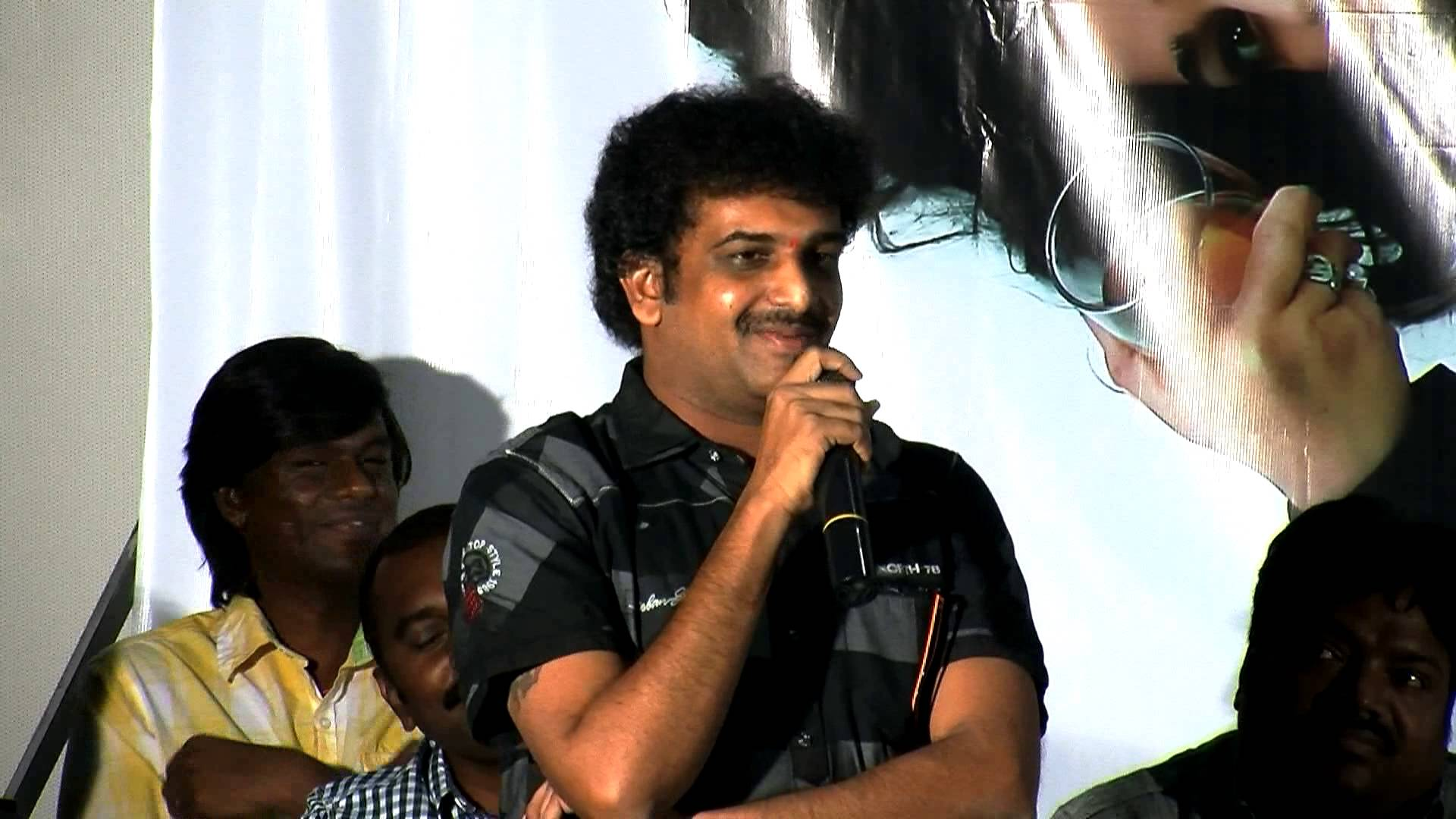
- Chandu at Prema Oka Maikam Audio Release Event
- Occupation: Director
- Website: www.filmdirectorchandu.com

Chandu (born Satti Chandra Sekhar Reddy, 17 October 1975) is an Indian film director who works in Telugu cinema.

== Career ==
Chandu started his career as an assistant director for V. V. Vinayak. In 2005, producer Shyam Prasad gave Chandu his first directing opportunity with SP Entertainments's film 10th Class. It was released in 2006 and was a success at the box office. Later, in 2007, his second directorial venture was the film Note Book, which was a failure. He launched the career of Rajeev (son of composer Koti). In 2013, Chandu wrote and directed Prema Oka Maikam.

== Filmography ==
As director

- 10th Class (2006)
- Note Book (2007)
- Prema Oka Maikam (2013)
- Vesavi Selavullo (2018)
- Vakalat (2023)

As assistant director

- Kalyana Ramudu (2003)
- Samba (2004)
