= Nandi Awards of 2005 =

Indian Telugu film and TV awards ceremony

The Nandi Awards are presented annually in Andhra Pradesh, for Telugu cinema by the state government. "Nandi" means "bull", the awards being named after the big granite bull at Lepakshi — a cultural and historical symbol of Andhra Pradesh. Nandi Awards are presented in four categories: Gold, Silver, Bronze, and Copper.

== 2005 Nandi Awards Winners List ==
Category	Winner	Film
Best Feature Film	Potheponi	Potheponi
Second Best Feature Film	Anukokunda Oka Roju	Anukokunda Oka Roju
Third Best Feature Film	Gowtam SSC	Gowtam SSC
Nandi Award for Akkineni Award for best home-viewing feature film	Nuvvostanante Nenoddantana	Nuvvostanante Nenoddantana
Best Popular Feature film providing Wholesome Entertainment	Pellam Pichodu	Pellam Pichodu
Best Director	Krishna Vamsi	Chakram
Best Actor	Mahesh Babu	Athadu
Best Actress	Trisha	Nuvvostanante Nenoddantana
Best Supporting Actor	Srihari	Nuvvostanante Nenoddantana
Best Supporting Actress	Bhanupriya	Chatrapathi
Best Character Actor	Chandra Mohan	Athanokkade
Best Male Comedian	Sunil	Andhrudu
Best Female Comedian	Santhoshi	Nuvvostanante Nenoddantana
Best Villain	Naramalli Sivaprasad	Danger
Best Child Actor	Pascha Sunny	Aasala Pallaki
Best Child Actress	Baby Aswini & Baby Trisha	Gulabilu
Best First Film of a Director	Surender Reddy	Athanokkade
Best Screenplay Writer	Chandra Sekhar Yeleti	Anukokunda Oka Roju
Best Story Writer	T Prabhakar	Meenakshi
Best Dialogue Writer	Trivikram Srinivas	Athadu
Best Lyricist	Sirivennela	Chakram
Best Cinematographer	PRK Raju	Radha Gopalam
Best Music Director	M. M. Keeravani	Chatrapathi
Best Male Playback Singer	S. P. Balasubrahmanyam	Pellam Pichodu
Best Female Playback Singer	Nitya Santoshini	Moguds Pellams
Best Editor	Kotagiri Venkateswara Rao	Subash Chandra Bose
Best Art Director	Vivek	Nuvvostanante Nenoddantana
Best Choreographer	Srinivas	Radha Gopalam
Best Audiographer	Madhusudhan Reddy	Jai Chiranjeeva
Best Costume Designer	Asha	Subash Chandra Bose
Best Makeup Artist	Raghava RV	Subash Chandra Bose
Best Fight Master	Ram Lakshman	Andhrudu
Best Male Dubbing Artist	Jaya Bhaskar	Vuri
Best Female Dubbing Artist	Sunitha	Potheponi
Best Special Effects	EFX	Athadu
Special Jury Award	Vadde Naveen	Naa Oopiri
Special Jury Award	Priyadarshini Ram	Manodu
Special Jury Award	Sneha	Radha Gopalam
Best film critic on Telugu Cinema	Mohan Goteti	Sitara
Best book on Telugu cinema	Cinema Rachana – Konni Moulika Amsalu	K Viswanath
