= Youth (2002 film) =

2002 Indian Tamil-language film by Vincent Selva

- Theatrical release poster
- Directed by: Vincent Selva
- Written by: N. Prasanna Kumar (dialogues)
- Screenplay by: Vincent Selva
- Story by: Trivikram Srinivas
- Based on: Chirunavvutho (Telugu) by G. Ram Prasad
- Produced by: T. Ajay Kumar
- Starring: Vijay; Shaheen Khan
- Cinematography: Natty Subramaniam
- Edited by: V. T. Vijayan
- Music by: Mani Sharma
- Production company: Lakshmi Productions
- Release date: 19 July 2002
- Running time: 170 minutes
- Country: India
- Language: Tamil

Youth is a 2002 Indian Tamil-language romantic comedy drama film directed by Vincent Selva. It is a remake of the Telugu film, Chirunavvutho (2000). It stars Vijay and Shaheen Khan (credited as Sandhya), while Yugendran, Vivek, Manivannan, and Sindhu Menon play other pivotal characters. The film released on 19 July 2002. It received positive reviews and was a commercial hit.

== Plot ==
On his wedding day, Shiva discovers that his cousin and bride, Aruna, has run away because she does not want to marry a cook. However, he takes it lightly and moves to Chennai with Aruna's brother Prabhu to look for a job. One night, Shiva saves a girl Sandhya from some goons. In gratitude, she kisses him. Shiva starts to fall in love with her. After several occasions where they bump into each other, Shiva harbours hope that she too reciprocates his affections.

However at Sandhya's birthday party, she announces her engagement to computer engineer Pratap. Shiva is devastated at the news and leaves the room quietly. Sandhya finds him standing alone at the swimming pool. She asks him about his impression of Pratap and is shocked when Shiva reveals to her that he loves her. Sandhya declares that she only feels friendship towards him and tells him to stop loving her.

After receiving a telephone call, Shiva goes to the police station and finds Aruna. She had eloped with her to-be lover. However, he later abandoned her and left her penniless. With no one to turn to, Aruna attempted suicide. Shiva takes her back home to take care of her. Prabhu was still angry and calls up their parents. Shiva speaks up for Aruna and gets the family to forgive her. Before returning to the village, Aruna meets Pratap and discovers that Sandhya's fiancé is actually the lover who abandoned her.

On the eve of Sandhya's wedding, she finally understands that she loves Shiva and tells her father that she does not want to marry Pratap. Her father refuses to cancel the wedding and gives Shiva a cheque for 10 million to get the latter to leave Sandhya. Sandhya runs away on her wedding day to look for Shiva and confesses to him that she loves him too. She wants to elope with Shiva, but he brings her back to the wedding venue.

Before the ceremony starts, he calls Pratap into a room and closes the door. When the door reopens, Shiva and Pratap had changed clothes. Shiva is now in the groom's attire, while Pratap is in ordinary clothes. Shiva marries Sandhya in the end. On their wedding night, Shiva reveals to Sandhya what happened between Pratap and him in the room. He offered Sandhya's father's cheque to Pratap in exchange for calling off his engagement, which Pratap accepted. Shiva also reveals that he knew that Sandhya's father would later cancel the cheque, thinking that Shiva is cheating him, which comes to pass.

== Cast ==
- Vijay as Shiva
- Shaheen Khan as Sandhya
- Vivek as "Karruthu" Kandasamy
- Simran in an item number for the song "Aal Thotta Boopathy"
- Vijayakumar as Shiva's maternal uncle
- Manivannan as Sandhya's father
- Yugendran as Pratap
- Shyam Ganesh as Prabhu
- Sindhu Menon as Aruna
- Cochin Haneefa as Dhanushkodi
- Kalairani as Aruna's mother
- Madhan Bob as Interviewer
- Bosskey as Giri
- Fathima Babu as Sandhya's mother
- Pandu
- Cell Murugan as Thief
- Ravikumar as Major Ravikumar, Sandhya's uncle
- Muthukaalai
- Bonda Mani
- Benjamin
- Thayir Vadai Desikan
- Kottachi
- Siva Narayana Murthy as Police Inspector
- Karnaa Radha

Uncredited

- Natty Subramaniam as a customer
- Diya as Fashion Show Host
- Mysskin (special appearance in "Old Model Laila")
- Sridhar as dancer in the song "Old Model Laila"
- Shobi as dancer in the song "Old Model Laila"
- Japan Kumar as dancer in the song "Aal Thotta Boopathy"

== Production ==
The film is a remake of the 2000 Telugu film Chiru Navvutho starring Venu and Shaheen Khan. The film was also made in Kannada as Premakke Sai in 2001 with Ravichandran and Shaheen. Despite appearing in only four feature films, three of Shaheen's films have featured her reprising the role of Sandhya. "Velu" and "Prince" were considered as titles before naming it as "Youth". Some scenes were shot at Hyderabad where a song too was shot on a lavish set erected, and it had Vijay dancing with about a hundred dancers. Some stunt scenes were later shot at Chennai, at the Vauhini Studios, at the AVM Studios, a lavish set costing a cool ₹12 lakh, was erected resembling a waterfall, with trees and grass around. A song was shot on the lead pair here. The song "Sagiyea Sagiyea", was shot in Niagara Falls, Toronto and Ottawa in Canada. Director Mysskin worked as an assistant director for this film.

== Soundtrack ==
Youth

Soundtrack album by Mani Sharma
- Released: 22 June 2002
- Recorded: 2002
- Genre: Feature film soundtrack
- Labels: Star Music; Hit Music; Ayngaran; Anak Audio; Sony Music; Eros Music
- Producer: Mani Sharma

The film's soundtrack is composed by Mani Sharma and consists of six songs. Sharma reused the tunes for three of the film's songs (namely "Sakhiye Sakhiye", "Santhosham" and "Adi One Inch") from his previous Telugu discography: Annayya (2000), Chiru Navvutho (2000), and Kushi (2001), while the rest of the songs are based on new tunes.

The song, "Aal Thotta Bhoopathi Nanada", featured Simran in an item number. The title of the song translates to "I am the king of Aal Garden", referring to the now non-existent Hall's Garden region of Chennai with a spelling mistake. Sharma later reused the tune of the song for "Calcutta Pan Vesina", in Raghavendra (2003).but later, the digital soundtrack album was released by Sony Music South, who holds the current distribution and streaming rights.

Song	Singer(s)	Lyricist(s)
"Old Model Laila"	Tippu	Vaali
"Adi One Inch"	S. P. Balasubrahmanyam; Sujatha	Vaali
"Sakhiye Sakhiyea"	Hariharan; Harini	Vairamuthu
"Sakkarai Nilave"	Harish Raghavendra	Vairamuthu
"Santhosam"	S. P. Balasubrahmanyam	Vairamuthu
"Aal Thotta Bhoopathi"	Shankar Mahadevan	Vaali; Kabilan (partial lyrics)

== Release and reception ==
The film released on 19 July 2002 and became a commercial success. Critics from The Hindu gave the film a positive review, In regard to performances, the critic mentioned that "Vijay is so used to this romantic sojourn that the essay comes without effort", while it was cited that Shaheen Khan's "magical screen presence is definitely missing". Cinesouth wrote "Vijay's fans expect a lot from his films. With a second rated screenplay, Vivek's comedy and a folksy tune, the film was made. They seem to have made the film relying solely on the expectations that his fans have. If the same trend is to continue, soon, Tamil cine industry is going to lose its 'Youth'fulness, wither away and bury itself".

=== Controversy over promotional tactics ===
According to an interview cited by Oneindia Tamil, former manager P. T. Selvakumar claimed that a controversial promotional tactic was used during the release of the film Youth. He alleged that when the film initially received a lukewarm response, he encouraged fans to dance in theatres and tear the screen during the popular song. Following this, incidents of fans tearing theatre screens were reported and widely circulated. The resulting media attention created publicity and increased audience turnout, which he claimed contributed to the film becoming a success.
