= Kushi (2001 film) =

2001 Telugu film by S. J. Suryah

- Film poster
- Directed by: S. J. Suryah
- Screenplay by: S. J. Suryah; Dialogues: Rajendra Kumar
- Produced by: A. M. Rathnam
- Starring: Pawan Kalyan; Bhumika
- Cinematography: P. C. Sreeram
- Edited by: B. Lenin; V. T. Vijayan; Kola Bhaskar
- Music by: Mani Sharma
- Production company: Sri Surya Movies
- Release date: 27 April 2001
- Running time: 177 minutes
- Country: India
- Language: Telugu
- Box office: ₹7.46 crore (re-release)

Kushi (transl. Happiness) is a 2001 South Indian Telugu-language romantic comedy film written and directed by S. J. Suryah and produced by A. M. Rathnam. The film stars Pawan Kalyan and Bhumika Chawla. The film was initially planned as a bilingual along with the Tamil version, but released a year later due to production delays. The film features music composed by Mani Sharma. Pawan Kalyan also choreographed all the action sequences and directed three songs in the film.

Kushi was released on 27 April 2001 and became a major blockbuster at the box office, emerging as the second highest-grossing Telugu film at the time. The film was critically acclaimed for its screenplay, music, cinematography and especially the performance of Pawan Kalyan. Kushi was the culmination of a streak of six consecutive hits for Pawan Kalyan and his style, mannerisms and dialogues from the film were much imitated by the youth.

Kushi was re-released on 31 December 2022 in 4K and became one of the highest grossing Telugu re-release of all time surpassing another Pawan Kalyan film Jalsa.

== Plot ==
The film opens when Madhu and Siddhu are born. Madhu's family is based in Kaikaluru of Andhra Pradesh and Siddhu's family is from Kolkata. As babies, Madhu and Siddhu meet in a shopping complex.

Madhu and her father love each other dearly. Madhu's father wants her daughter to get married and wanted to keep his son-in-law with them and so that his daughter will not leave him. However, her groom elopes with his girlfriend, apologizing to Madhu that he did not want to ruin another girl's life.

Siddhu receives a visa for higher studies in Canada, his car met with an accident on his way to airport, which results him hospitalized for a period. Coincidentally, he receives Madhu's blood. Madhu convinces her father to go for higher studies and not be bothered with marriage. Sidhu cannot make it to Canada and joins the same college as Madhu. Incidentally, they meet in a temple. They become good friends, while also helping Madhu's friend, Santhi, and Siddhu's friend, Babu, who are in love. Santhi's father is a big goon, and Madhu and Siddhu ensure that Santhi and Babu do not reveal their love to Shanti's father and get into any trouble. One day while Madhu is studying for exams, Siddhu happens to come. Madhu's sari moves in the breeze, revealing her navel. Siddhu ogles it. Madhu accuses Siddhu of ogling, and Siddhu denies it. An argument breaks out leading to them accusing each other of hiding their feelings for the other. They end their friendship.

After the summer holidays, Santhi's dad finds out about Babu. Madhu and Siddhu meet again for the sake of their friend's love. In the course of getting Babu and Shanti together, they realize they love each other. They try to confess each other but they miss still they manage to give their co-passengers the letter they read each other letters. 10 years later, Madhu and Siddhu are married with 17 children including one triplet and others twins and Madhu is pregnant yet again. They are interviewed for their Guinness World Record of having 17 kids in 10 years.

== Cast ==
- Pawan Kalyan as Siddhartha "Siddhu" Roy
- Bhumika as Madhumati (voice dubbed by Savitha)
- Sivaji as Babu
- Rajan P. Dev as Gudumba Satti
- Sudhakar as Venky
- Nassar as Siddhu's father
- Janaki Sabesh as Geetha, Siddhu's mother
- Vijayakumar as Madhu's father
- Sudha as Madhu's mother
- Ali as Babu Moshai
- Mumtaj as Anitha
- Ajay as Sheru, college student
- Fish Venkat as Gudumba Satti's henchman
- Manish Borundia as Siddhu's friend
- Anil Yadav as Gorakh
- S. J. Surya as a pedestrian (cameo appearance)

== Production ==
=== Development ===
After watching the premiere of Vaalee (1999), A. M. Rathnam wanted to make a film with S. J. Suryah and zeroed in on a love story for the project. They cast Vijay for the Tamil version and Pawan Kalyan for the Telugu version. As Kalyan was busy with the production of Badri (2000) at the time, the Telugu version got delayed by a year while the Tamil version released in 2000.

The film was announced in 1999 with the title Cheppalani Vundi and starring Pawan Kalyan and Ameesha Patel with music by Ramana Gogula. Regarding the title Rathnam later noted, "Surprisingly for this film, our original title was Cheppalani Vundhi, on the lines of Chiranjeevi’s Choodalani Vundhi (1998). The story is about two people who love each other but their ego stops them from expressing it directly, so we thought it was apt." The title was later changed to Kushi after another film titled Neetho Cheppalani Vundi tried to cash in on the craze. Mani Sharma replaced Ramana Gogula as music director after the latter supposedly rejected the project to break the monotony of Pawan Kalyan-Ramana Gogula combination.

As Ameesha Patel got busy after the release of Kaho Naa... Pyaar Hai (2000), the makers had to search for a new female lead. S. J. Suryah cast Bhumika as the female lead after watching Yuvakudu (2000).

=== Filming ===
As Kalyan insisted on additional fight sequences in the film, Suryah asked Kalyan to direct them as he did not feel them necessary to the story. Kalyan also went on to direct three songs, namely, "Ye Mera Jahan," "Premante Suluvu Kaaduraa" and "Aaduvari Matalaku." The introduction song of the actress in the Tamil version was also replaced to accommodate the protagonist's introduction. One song was shot in Calcutta and two in Hyderabad.

Producer A. M. Rathnam noted in September 2000 that the filming would be completed by December and the film would release for Sankranthi festival in January 2001.

== Music ==
Mani Sharma composed the film's soundtrack, which was released in CDs along with cassettes, by Aditya Music. The song "Aaduvari Maatalaku", originally written by Pingali for Missamma (1955), was remixed by Mani Sharma with vocals by Murali.

Mani Sharma reused the song "Premada Lokada" from 2001 Kannada movie Premakke Sai as Ye Mera Jaha with same singer KK (singer) and songs "Ammaye Sannaga" and "Ye Mera Jaha" as "Achchacho Punnagai" and "Kadhal Oru," respectively, in the Tamil film Shahjahan (2001). He also reused the song "Cheliya Cheliya" as "Sakiye Sakiye" in the Tamil film Youth (2002).

Kushi

Soundtrack album by Mani Sharma
- Released: 2001
- Recorded: 2001
- Genre: Feature film soundtrack
- Length: 30:12
- Language: Telugu
- Label: Aditya Music
- Producer: Mani Sharma

Mani Sharma chronology
Murari (2001)	Kushi (2001)	Devi Putrudu (2001)

Track list
No.	Title	Lyrics	Singer(s)	Length
1.	"Ye Mera Jaha"	Abbas Tyrewala	KK	05:14
2.	"Ammaye Sannaga"	Chandrabose	Udit Narayan and Kavita Krishnamurthy	04:52
3.	"Cheliya Cheliya"	A. M. Rathnam	Harini and Srinivas	05:41
4.	"Premante"	A. M. Rathnam	Devan Ekambaram and Kalpana	06:14
5.	"Aaduvari Matalaku"	Pingali	Khushi Murali	03:01
6.	"Holi Holi"	Suddala Ashok Teja	Mano and Swarnalatha	05:12
7.	"Bye Byee Bangaru Ramanamma"		Pawan Kalyan	00:51
Total length:				31:05

== Release ==
=== Distribution ===
A. M. Rathnam was reported to have netted a table profit of ₹3 crore. The Nizam territory theatrical rights were bought outright for ₹4.5 crore. The film also set the record for USA distribution rights for a reported ₹15 lakh beating Jayam Manadera's record of ₹9 lakh.

Kushi was released on 27 April 2001. It was reportedly the first ever Telugu film to release in London. It was later dubbed in Hindi as Humjoli.

=== Re-release ===
In 2002, reports indicated plans to re-release Kushi with 160 prints in April, a year after its initial release. If implemented, this would have been a record-setting second release in Telugu cinema.

The film was eventually re-released in a remastered 4K version on 31 December 2022. The re-release achieved significant commercial success, becoming the highest-grossing Telugu re-release of all time, surpassing the previous record held by Pawan Kalyan's Jalsa.

== Reception ==
=== Critical reception ===
Idlebrain.com rated the film 4.5/5 and called it a "One man show" of Pawan Kalyan. The reviewer also appreciated the screenplay by S. J. Surya. Sify rated the film 3/5 and also called it "an out and out Pavan Kalyan film, which totally depends on his larger than life image".

=== Box office ===
Kushi was very successful at the box office. It collected a distributor's share of ₹23.4 crore in its original run in 2001, and emerged as the second highest-grossing Telugu film at the time of its release. The film had a 50-day theatrical run in 101 centres and a 100-day run in 79 centres.

=== Re-release ===
Kushi was re-released in 2023 and became the highest grossing Telugu re-release film, grossing over ₹7.46 crore, surpassing another Pawan Kalyan film Jalsa. It was eventually surpassed by Mahesh Babu's Murari later onwards. It is currently the highest-grossing Telugu film of 2001 after the re-release.

== Future ==
Years later, Suryah narrated the sequel's storyline to Kalyan but the plans were dropped as Kalyan became busy in politics.

== Awards and nominations ==
Ceremony	Category	Nominee	Result	Ref(s)
49th Filmfare Awards South	Best Film – Telugu	A. M. Rathnam	Nominated	
49th Filmfare Awards South	Best Actor – Telugu	Pawan Kalyan	Nominated	
49th Filmfare Awards South	Best Actress – Telugu	Bhumika Chawla	Won	
49th Filmfare Awards South	Best Music Director – Telugu	Mani Sharma	Nominated	
