= Pulagam Chinnarayana =

Indian writer, reporter, critic

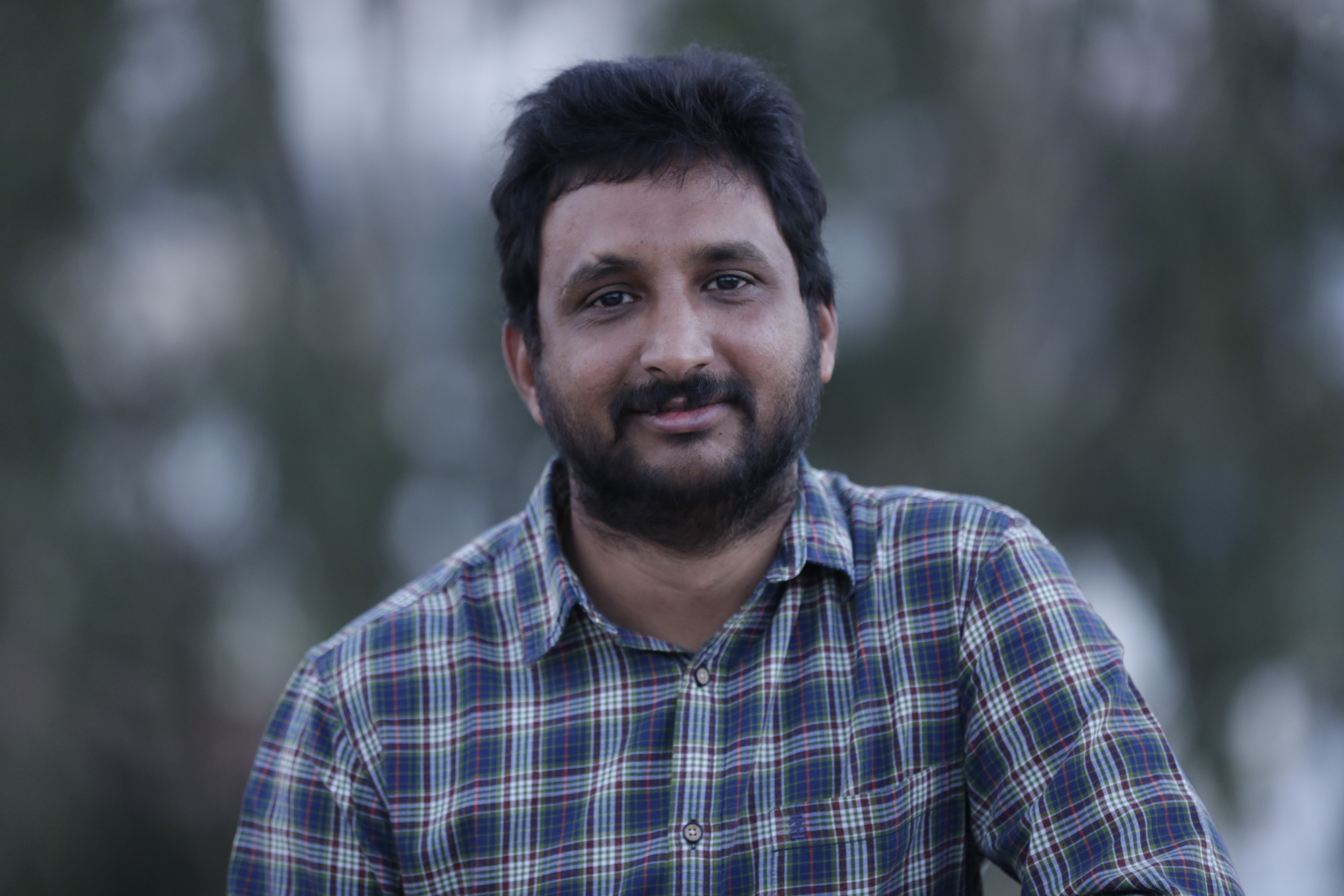
- Born: Bhimavaram, West Godavari District, Andhra Pradesh, India
- Occupations: Journalist; author; film critic; lyricist; dialogue writer; public relations officer
- Years active: 2000–present
- Website: pulagam.in

Pulagam Chinnarayana is an Indian Telugu cinema journalist, film critic, screenwriter, lyricist, author and public relations officer.

He has received multiple accolades, including two Nandi Awards for Best Book on Telugu Cinema for his works Aanaati Aanavaallu (2009) and Pasidi Thera (2015). He also won the Nandi Award for Best Film Critic in 2014.

== Career ==
=== Films ===
Chinnarayana has been working as public relations officer, dialogue writer, and lyricist for Telugu cinema. As he was acquainted with Puri Jagannadh during the film Badri, he worked on the film Itlu Sravani Subramanyam as a PRO for the first time. He then worked on Nuvvu Nenu, directed by Teja. He worked as PRO for actors Ram Pothineni and Kartikeya Gummakonda. He turned lyricist with Mahesh, starring Sundeep Kishan. He turned dialogue writer with Prema Oka Maikam starring Charmy Kaur and has been penning dialogues for Yashoda starring Samantha Ruth Prabhu.

=== Books ===
Chinnarayana authored his first book Jandhya Marutham compiling 39 films directed by Jandhyala. It has a foreword written by actor Chiranjeevi, the first time he wrote foreword for a book. It was launched at State Art Gallery in Hyderabad organized by Hasam magazine. Actors Chiranjeevi and Rajendra Prasad attended the function, where the former launched the book.

Chinnarayana then authored Aanaati Aanavaallu which had a foreword written by director Trivikram Srinivas. Within a month of release, all the copies of first print were sold out, and the publisher issued it for the second print. He won Nandi Award for Best Book on Telugu Cinema from Andhra Pradesh state government for this book, in 2009 and 2016 respectively. His next work Cine Poornodayam which was based on life of Edida Nageswara Rao, owner of Poornodaya Creations. Chinnarayana wrote Svarnayuga Sangeetha Darshakulu, which detailed the work of music directors between 1932 and 1982. It was proofread by singer S.P. Balasubrahmanyam, and music director M.M. Keeravani wrote the foreword for this book. Later, Chinnarayana came up with Pasidi Thera which was a compilation of details about 100 films and a sequel to Aanaati Aanavaallu and Cinema Venuka Storeelu which had background details of films made after 2000. Among them, he won Nandi Award for Best Book on Telugu Cinema from Andhra Pradesh State Government for Pasidi Thera, in 2016. Later, Chinnarayana authored Maya Bazar Madhura Smruthulu, a book on film Mayabazar by associating with Viswanatha Reddy, son of film's producer Nagi Reddy. Chinnarayana made a documentary to accompany the book and he got commendation from Vice President of India Venkaiah Naidu.

Chinnarayana authored Vendi Chandamamalu along with another writer Vaddi Om Prakash Narayana, focusing on "Venditera Navalalu", the term for novels about Telugu cinema shot between 50s and 70s. This book was released on 2 October 2019 by director Vamsy, and the first copy was received by Ravi Prasad Paadi, a higher level official of South Central Railway.

In the year 2021, the first look of his upcoming book Jai Vittalacharya was launched by Krishna (Telugu actor) which is based on the cinematic journey of legendary director B. Vittalacharya. The book was launched officially on 1 October 2023 by director Trivikram Srinivas. M. L. Narasimham of The Hindu described it as "a comprehensive book on Vittalacharya, his style of making a movie, his journey with his works, and his personality, Jai Vittalacharya comes with rare personal photographs of the veteran director, besides stills from his films."

In December 2024, Chinnarayana compiled and edited the book Master of Suspense: Hitchcock, along with Ravi Padi. This book is a compilation of 60 essays about Alfred Hitchcock, written by several filmmakers, journalists and writers from Telugu film industry. This book was launched in the presence of film personalities like Vamsy, Mohana Krishna Indraganti, Harish Shankar, Nassar etc.

In 2024, Chinnarayana published the book Padamati Cinema Parimalam, a compilation of articles written by twenty-three writers who are affiliated to Telugu film industry through various crafts. The writers include filmmakers like Singeetam Srinivasa Rao, Dasari Narayana Rao, Krishna Vamsi etc. where they wrote about their emotional connections with various films produced across the world.

In December 2025, Chinnarayana published the book Prapancha Cinema Parimalam, a compilation of articles written about World Cinema. In its review, The Hans India wrote "At its core, Prapancha Cinema Parimalam is an ambitious and thoughtful attempt to bring together global cinematic classics and the minds they have inspired. Chinnarayana handpicks 26 landmark films from world cinema".

== Works ==
=== Publications ===
Year	Book	Ref(s)
2005	Jandhya Marutham	
2009	Aanaati Aanavaallu	
2009	Cine Poornodayam	
2011	Swarnayuga Sangeetha Darshakulu	
2016	Pasidi Thera	
2017	Cinema Venuka Storeelu	
2018	Maya Bazar Madhura Smruthulu	
2019	Vendi Chandamamalu	
2023	Jai Vittalacharya	
2024	Padamati Cinema Parimalam	
2024	Master of Suspense: Hitchcock	
2025	Prapancha Cinema Parimalam	

=== As lyricist ===
Year	Film	Composer	Song name	Ref(s)
2013	Mahesh	Gopi Sundar	"Madi Moose"	
2014	Preminchali	Yuvan shankar raja	Kotha ala ee premaraa... Konte kaala ee premaraa!	
2016	Garam	Agastya	"Rabbaa Rabbaa"	
2016	Manalo Okadu	R. P. Patnaik	"Dum Maro Dum"	
2017	Paisa Vasool	Anup Rubens	"Padhamari"	
2018	Aatagadharaa Siva	Vasuki Vaibhav	"Rama Rama Re"	
2018	Janatha hotel	Gopi Sundar	Chal Chal Kalame, Agena Keratame	
2018	Shubhalekha+Lu	K. M. Radha Krishnan	"Cheppaka Tappadu Antey"	
2019	7	Chaitan Bharadwaj	"Idhivarakepudu"	

=== As dialogue writer ===
Year	Film	Ref(s)
2013	Prema Oka Maikam	
2017	Gulf	
2018	Bluff Master	
2022	Yashoda	
2026	Ee Paata Korinavaru Nemalipalem Nundi Rama, Jyotsna, Nandu, Murali, Kabir, Dhol Ravi Modalaguvaaru	

== Awards and recognition ==
- 2006 Santosham Film Awards as a Best Journalist and PRO Award (for Pokiri)
- 2007 A.P Cinegoers 36th Annual Film Awards for Best Film Journalist Award.
- 2009 Nandi Award for Best Book on Telugu Cinema (for Aanati Aanavaallu)
- 2014 Nandi Award for Best Film Critic
- 2016 Nandi Award for Best Book on Telugu Cinema (for Pasidi Tera)
