= Dharmavarapu Subramanyam =

Indian actor (1954-2013)

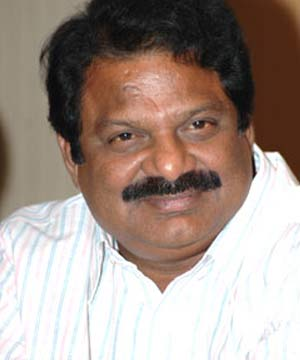
- Born: 20 September 1954; Komminenivaripalem, Andhra State, India
- Died: 7 December 2013 (age 59); Hyderabad, Andhra Pradesh (now in Telangana), India
- Occupations: Actor; director; producer; writer; singer; politician
- Years active: 1982–2013
- Political party: Indian National Congress (1999—2010)
- Spouses: Varalakshmi Kalpavalli (m. 1979; died 1990) Saroja Devi (m. 1992)
- Children: 2

Dharmavarapu Subrahmanyam (20 September 1954 – 7 December 2013) was an Indian actor, comedian and film director who worked in Telugu cinema. He was established as one of the highly paid and top most leading comedians in Telugu film industry. Dharmavarapu had huge fan following among Telugu audience for his unique style and dialogue modulation. He hosted several popular television shows.

Dharmavarapu has received two state Nandi Awards for best male comedian for his roles in Yagnam (2004) and Aalasyam Amrutam (2010).

== Early life ==
Dharmavarapu was born in a Traditional Telugu Aruvela Niyogi Brahmin family at Komminenivaripalem in Prakasam district, Andhra Pradesh.

== Career ==
Dharmavarapu originally worked as a government employee. He became popular through his comedy serial "Anando Brahma" which he both acted in and directed. It was aired on Doordarshan in the 1980s becoming a sensational hit show in Andhra Pradesh changing the trend of Television media in entertainment.

His first film appearance was in the Jandhyala-directed Jayammu Nischayammu Raa in 1989. He was renowned for his comedy roles and flawless dialogue delivery.

Later, he went on to act in various films with star heroes like Chiranjeevi, Balakrishna, Rajinikanth, Nagarjuna, Venkatesh, Mahesh Babu, Pawan Kalyan, Prabhas, Jr. NTR, Ram Charan, Allu Arjun, Ravi Teja. He also directed a Telugu film, Thokaleni Pitta, starring Naresh in the lead produced by Kona Venkat.

== Death ==
Dharmavarapu died on 7 December 2013, after fighting liver cancer for several months.

== Filmography ==
=== As an actor ===
==== Telugu films ====
Year	Title	Role	Note
1989	Bava Bava Panneeru		
1989	Jayammu Nischayammu Raa		
1990	Irugillu Porugillu		
1990	Prema Zindabad		
1991	Stuvartpuram Dongalu		
1991	Jeevana Chadarangam		
1991	Prardhana		
1991	Vichitra Prema		
1991	Taraka Prabhuni Deeksha Mahimalu		
1991	Indra Bhavanam		
1991	Pelli Pustakam		
1992	Babai Hotel		
1992	Swathi Kiranam		
1993	Prema Chitram Pelli Vichitram		
1993	Kalachakram		
1993	One By Two		
1993	Anna Chellelu		
1993	Jeevithame Oka Cinema		
1993	Mr. Pellam		
1993	Matru Devo Bhava		
1993	Konguchaatu Krishnudu		
1993	Ladies Special		
1993	Ish Gup Chup		
1994	Pelli Koduku		
1994	Lucky Chance		
1994	Parugo Parugu		
1994	Angarakshasudu		
1994	Criminal		
1994	Neram		
1994	Kishkindha Kanda		
1994	Brahmachari Mogudu		
1995	Sisindri		
1995	Chinnabbulu		
1995	Adavi Dora		
1995	Sankalpam		
1995	Leader		
1995	Gharana Bullodu		
1996	Kuturu		
1996	Hello Neeku Naaku Pellanta		
1996	Gunshot		
1996	Oho Naa Pellanta		
1996	Once More		
1997	Kaliyugamlo Gandargolam		
1997	Priyamaina Srivaru		
1997	Super Heroes		
1997	Master		
1998	Gamyam	Fakheerayya	
1998	Allari Pellam		
1998	Padutha Theeyaga		
1999	Vichitram	Annavaram	
1999	Swayamvaram	Dr. Dhairyam	
2000	Nuvve Kavali		
2001	Nuvvu Nenu		
2001	Anandam		
2001	Darling Darling	Doctor	
2001	9 Nelalu		
2001	Family Circus		
2002	Nee Sneham		
2002	Lagna Patrika		
2002	Seema Simham		
2002	Sontham	Subbu	
2002	Nuvve Nuvve		
2002	Tappu Chesi Pappu Koodu		
2002	Sreeram		
2002	Indra		
2002	Jayam		
2002	Aaduthu Paaduthu		
2002	Pilisthe Palukutha		
2002	Dhanalakshmi, I Love You		
2002	Manmadhudu		
2003	Okkadu		
2003	Fools		
2003	Aadanthe Ado Type		
2003	Veede		
2003	Tagore		
2003	Palnati Bramhanaidu		
2003	Goa		
2003	Dhanush		
2003	Ammulu		
2003	Okariki Okaru		
2003	Ammayilu Abbayilu		
2003	Amma Nanna O Tamila Ammayi		
2003	Vijayam		
2003	Simhadri		
2003	Dongodu		
2003	Vasantham		
2003	Avuna		
2004	Swetha Naagu		
2004	Naani		
2004	Yagnam		
2004	Guri		
2004	Donga Dongadi		
2004	Varsham		
2004	Mr & Mrs Sailaja Krishnamurthy		
2004	Leela Mahal Center		
2004	Malliswari		
2004	Venky		
2004	143		
2004	Mass		
2004	Nenunnanu		
2004	Puttintiki Ra Chelli		
2004	123 from Amalapuram		
2005	Balu ABCDEFG		
2005	Dhana 51		
2005	Allari Bullodu		
2005	Nuvvostanante Nenoddantana		
2005	Avunanna Kaadanna		
2005	Athanokkade		
2005	Andarivaadu		
2005	Athadu		
2005	Good Boy		
2005	Andhrudu		
2005	Veeri Veeri Gummadi Pandu		
2005	Jai Chiranjeeva		
2005	Gowtam SSC		
2006	Style		
2006	Sri Ramadasu		
2006	Bangaram		
2006	Evandoi Srivaru		
2006	Bommarillu		
2006	Andala Ramudu		
2006	Veerabhadra		
2006	Khatarnak		
2006	Annavaram		
2007	Pagale Vennela		
2007	Operation Duryodhana		
2007	Allare Allari		
2007	Shankardada Zindabad		
2007	Chirutha		
2008	Blade Babji		
2008	Jalsa		
2008	Pandurangadu		
2008	Somberi		
2008	Ready		
2008	Bommana Brothers Chandana Sisters		
2008	Bhale Dongalu		
2008	Ullasamga Utsahamga		
2008	Adivishnu		
2008	Siddu From Sikakulam		
2008	Keka		
2008	King		
2008	Kantri		
2009	Kick		
2009	Pistha		
2009	Ride		
2009	Bendu Apparao R.M.P		
2009	Bangaru Babu		
2010	Namo Venkatesa		
2010	Darling		
2010	Khaleja	Travels Owner	
2010	Nagavalli		
2010	Kathi Kantha Rao		
2010	Simha		
2011	100% Love		
2011	Aakasame Haddu		
2011	Dookudu	Cool Babu	
2011	Madatha Kaja		
2012	Racha		
2012	Businessman	Lalu's PA	
2012	Bodyguard		
2012	Tuneega Tuneega		
2012	Sudigadu		
2012	Daruvu	Priest	
2012	Cameraman Ganga Tho Rambabu		
2012	Julai		
2013	Shadow		
2013	Greeku Veerudu		
2013	Jabardasth		
2013	Chukkalanti Ammayi Chakkanaina Abbayi		
2013	Hum Tum		
2014	Amrutham Chandamamalo		Posthumously released
2014	Dillunnodu		Posthumously released
2015	Rudramadevi		Posthumously released

==== Tamil films ====
Year	Title	Role	Note
2004	New	Police officer	
2005	Mannin Maindhan	Raghavan	Guest appearance
2006	Chennai Kadhal	Gautham's father	credited as Dharmapuram Subramanyam

==== Other language films ====
Year	Title	Role	Note
1995	Criminal	Inspector	Hindi
2004	Love	Kotta Nembu	Kannada
2004	Morning Raga	Appa Rao	English

==== Television ====
- Popula Pette (1997) as Panakala Rao
- Lady Detective

=== As director ===
- Thokaleni Pitta (1997)
