= Nandi Awards of 1972 =

Indian Telugu film and TV awards ceremony

Nandi Awards, presented annually by the Government of Andhra Pradesh, were first awarded in 1964.

The recipients of the best film awards in 1972 were:

== 1972 Nandi Awards Winners List ==
| Category | Winner | Film |
|---|---|---|
| Best Feature Film | K. Viswanath | Kalam Marindi |
| Second Best Feature Film | Dasari Narayana Rao | Tata Manavadu |
| Third Best Feature Film | V. Madhusudhana Rao | Praja Nayakudu |
