= Athadu =

2005 film by Trivikram Srinivas

- Theatrical release poster
- Directed by: Trivikram Srinivas
- Written by: Trivikram Srinivas
- Produced by: Duggirala Kishore; M. Ram Mohan
- Starring: Mahesh Babu; Trisha; Prakash Raj; Sonu Sood
- Cinematography: K. V. Guhan
- Edited by: A. Sreekar Prasad
- Music by: Mani Sharma
- Production company: Jayabheri Arts
- Distributed by: Jayabheri Arts
- Release date: 10 August 2005
- Running time: 172 minutes
- Country: India
- Language: Telugu
- Budget: ₹12–13 crore
- Box office: ₹22 crore share worldwide (₹18.6 crore Andhra Pradesh + overseas)

Athadu (transl. Him) is a 2005 Indian Telugu-language action comedy thriller film written and directed by Trivikram Srinivas and produced by Jayabheri Arts. The film stars Mahesh Babu as a hitman hired to stage the assassination of a politician, only to be framed for the actual murder, forcing him to assume a new identity while evading the law. The supporting cast includes Trisha, Sonu Sood, Prakash Raj, Nassar, Sunil, Sayaji Shinde, Kota Srinivasa Rao and Brahmanandam. The music was composed by Mani Sharma, while K. V. Guhan handled the cinematography.

Athadu was released on 10 August 2005 and received critical acclaim from critics and audiences and emerged as one of the highest-grossing Telugu films of the year collecting a distributor's share of approximately ₹22 crore (US$2.3 million) in its total run. It won three Nandi Awards and a Filmfare Award South for Best Director – Telugu. It is the only Telugu film to have aired over a thousand times on television. The film was remade in Hindi as Ek: The Power of One (2009) and in Bengali as Wanted (2010).

== Plot ==
Siva Reddy, the leader of the opposition, intends to secure an upcoming election victory by staging a failed assassination attempt on himself to garner sympathy votes. To execute the plan, Siva Reddy, his deputy Baaji Reddy, and their aide Farooq hire a professional killer named Nanda Gopal "Nandu" and his partner Malli. On the day of the operation, the plan collapses when Siva Reddy is actually shot dead by an unknown sniper. As they flee, Nandu witnesses Malli die when his getaway car collides with a petrol tanker and explodes. Nandu manages to evade the police dragnet by jumping onto a moving train.

On the train, Nandu meets Parthasaradhi "Pardhu", a young man returning to his hometown of Basarlapudi after running away as a child two decades prior. When the train halts at a station, a police search party boards the carriage. A sub-inspector identifies Nandu by his clothes and fires, but the bullet misses Nandu and kills Pardhu instead. Nandu uses the ensuing chaos to escape and travels to Basarlapudi. Upon his arrival, Pardhu’s unsuspecting family mistakes Nandu for their long-lost relative and welcomes him into their home. Over time, Nandu deeply bonds with the household, and Pardhu's cousin, Poori, falls in love with him. Nandu quietly resolves several family crises, including protecting their ancestral farmland, assisting a local family burdened by Pardhu's childhood actions, and secretly withdrawing his own contract-killing money to fund Poori's sister's wedding. He ultimately confides his true identity only to Pardhu's childhood friend, Ramana.

Meanwhile, CBI Officer Anjaneya Prasad is assigned to investigate Siva Reddy's murder. Noticing deep inconsistencies in the initial evidence, Prasad tracks leads to Basarlapudi but initially fails to uncover Nandu's disguise. Because the forensic evidence points toward the deceased Malli, Prasad consults Sadhu, Nandu and Malli's former prison mentor. After uncovering Nandu's bank account details and tracing the wedding fund withdrawal, Prasad calls the Basarlapudi household and tricks Nandu into exposing himself, forcing Nandu to flee. Prasad arrives at the house, informs the family of the real Pardhu's death, and departs. The revelation leaves the family devastated, but Ramana defends Nandu, highlighting how he selflessly mended the family's fractured lives without taking credit.

Nandu returns to the house to face the outraged family, admitting to the impersonation but maintaining that he never intended to hurt them. Pardhu's grandfather, Satyanarayana Murthy, takes Nandu into his study. Privately acknowledging Nandu as his true grandson, Murthy notes that Nandu chose to save the family out of genuine love. He hands Nandu an old family shotgun—the same weapon that had previously misfired and killed Pardhu's father due to an obstructed barrel—and encourages him to uncover the conspiracy to clear his name. Unbeknownst to both men, the gun's barrel has become obstructed again by a marble dropped inside by playing children.

Nandu contacts Baaji Reddy, blackmailing him with a fabricated recording of their original assignment. A panicked Baaji Reddy reveals that Malli is actually alive; Baaji Reddy had bribed him to double-cross Nandu and assassinate Siva Reddy so Baaji Reddy could claim the Chief Minister's seat. Nandu records this confession and tracks Malli to a church, where they are ambushed by corrupt police officers. Nandu eliminates the attackers and confronts his former partner. Malli seizes Nandu’s shotgun and pulls the trigger, but the obstructed barrel causes the weapon to backfire, killing Malli instantly.

Prasad arrives at the scene, and Nandu hands over the recorded confession. Armed with the tape, Prasad confronts Baaji Reddy. When the politician arrogantly dismisses the recording as inadmissible in court, Prasad counters that Siva Reddy’s vengeful son will execute him the moment the truth leaks to the public. Facing brutal retribution, Baaji Reddy commits suicide. Later, Prasad finds Nandu performing Pardhu's final rites on a riverbank. Addressing him officially as Pardhu, Prasad reveals that he has cleared Nandu's criminal record and grants him his freedom. Fully embracing his new life, Nandu returns to Basarlapudi to live permanently with his family.

== Cast ==
- Mahesh Babu as Nanda Gopal "Nandu"/Arjun, a hitman who takes up the identity of Pardhu
  - Manoj Nandam as Young Nanda Gopal "Nandu"
- Trisha as Poori, Pardhu's cousin and Nandu's love interest (voice dubbed by Savitha Reddy)
- Prakash Raj as Anjaneya Prasad IPS, designated to CBI Officer, takes up the case of Siva Reddy's assassination.
- Sonu Sood as Malli, Nandu's partner (voice dubbed by P. Ravi Shankar)
- Sayaji Shinde as Siva Reddy, opposition party leader and Pratap Reddy's father
- Kota Srinivasa Rao as Baaji Reddy, Siva Reddy's close aide
- Rahul Dev as Sadhu, a local don, Nandu and Malli's mentor (voice dubbed by P. Ravi Shankar)
- Nassar as Satyanarayana Murthy, Pardhu's grandfather (voice dubbed by S.P.Balasubrahmanyam)
- Sunil as Ramana, Pardhu's friend
- Rajiv Kanakala as Parthasaradhi "Pardhu"
- Ajay as Pratap Reddy, Siva Reddy's son
- Giri Babu as Poori's father
- Dharmavarapu Subramanyam as Poori's 1st uncle
- Brahmanandam as Poori's 2nd uncle
- Sudha as Poori's mother
- Sruthi as Poori's 1st aunt
- Hema as Poori's 2nd aunt
- Charan Raj as SP Sundar (voice dubbed by P. Ravi Shankar)
- Tanikella Bharani as Naidu
- Brahmaji as Nagasamudram Bujji, Naidu's brother-in-law
- Posani Krishna Murali as Farooq, Siva Reddy's aide
- Ravi Prakash as CI Ravi, Anjaneya Prasad's assistant
- Harsha Vardhan as a car agency owner
- Vajja Venkata Giridhar as Giri, Pardhu's friend
- Harika as Lalitha, Poori's elder sister
- Prabhu as SI Prabhu
- M. S. Narayana as Tea Shop customer
- Ananth as Doctor
- Gundu Sudarshan as a corrupt MRO
- Rallapalli as Datthu, Manager of Tanuku Manjeera Bank
- Mounica as Poori's younger cousin
- K. Vishwanath as CBI Officer (special appearance)

== Production ==
=== Development ===
In an interview with the media about his film Julayi (2012), Trivikram shared his views on this film, stating :

I narrated the story of Athadu to Mahesh Babu before the start of Nuvve Nuvve shoot. Before making of Athadu, I fixed myself that I should not compromise at any cost. I wanted to make the film the way I envisioned it. I wanted to satisfy the audience in me after shooting every scene. I doubled checked each and every scene as an audience. I was able to achieve only 80% of what I had imagined when I wrote the script. If you look at the first 15 minutes of the Athadu movie, you will realize the level of intensity and technical finesse.

=== Casting ===
Initially, Trivikram Srinivas wanted to do this film with Pawan Kalyan and narrated the script. But he did not show much interest in signing the film and even slept during the narration. Mahesh Babu listened to the script of this film in 2002 but Trvikram and the film's producers had to wait for him till he completed the shooting schedules of S. J. Surya's science fiction film Naani and Gunasekhar's family drama Arjun as they were his existing commitments then. The shooting started a month later after the completion of Arjun. For his characterization and the dialogues uttered by the character he played, Mahesh had to adjust to Trivikram's style of dialogues, which took ten days. Trisha was selected for the leading female role. In an interview with the media on 29 June 2005 at the event of audio release stated that she would be seen in a role with shades of comedy though she added that her role was a limited one.

Murali Mohan later revealed that he wanted his friend and former Telugu actor Sobhan Babu to play the role of Satya Narayana Murthy, which would have marked his comeback film, who was then busy with a highly profitable real estate career. For the same, Murali Mohan even issued and sent a blank cheque to Sobhan Babu's residence at Chennai as the remuneration. But Sobhan Babu refused to do that role and rejected the offer politely. Later, Nassar portrayed that role with S. P. Balasubrahmanyam dubbing for him in frail voice and his performance was appreciated by critics.

=== Filming ===
For the film's shoot, 160 digital still cameras were imported from London, to shoot freeze-frames in action sequences. Not more than ten shots were shot per day and four to five complicated action sequences were shot under the supervision of Peter Hein and the climax sequence was shot indoors, which took enormous time to complete thus making the principal photography end after a span of two years. A big set was constructed at Ramanaidu Studios in Nanakramguda at Hyderabad where most of the film's family scenes were shot. On 7 August 2004, a scene featuring Mahesh and Sunil was shot on the bridge of the lake at ICRISAT campus in Hyderabad.

== Soundtrack ==
Athadu

Soundtrack album by Mani Sharma
- Released: 29 June 2005
- Recorded: 2005
- Genre: Feature film soundtrack
- Length: 29:52
- Language: Telugu
- Label: Maruthi Music
- Producer: Mani Sharma

Mani Sharma chronology
Narasimhudu (2005)	Athadu (2005)	Allari Pidugu (2005)

Mani Sharma composed the music for this film marking his first collaboration with Trivikram Srinivas and eighth collaboration with Mahesh Babu. This album consists of six melodies while Sirivennela Sitaramasastri and Viswa penned the lyrics.

The film's soundtrack was released by Mahesh Babu's father and Telugu actor Krishna on 29 June 2005 at the house set of the film constructed at Nanakramguda through Maruthi Music label.

The film's soundtrack and score by Mani Sharma received critical acclaim. Upon the film's release, Sharma's background score and the title song were well received. However, parts of the title song were noted to be influenced by Christina Aguilera's "Fighter". Idlebrain.com highlighted the picturisation of the opening song, the Mexican-inspired "Neetho Cheppana", and the effective background score. Sify praised Mani Sharma's music, particularly the "Neeto Chappana" song, filmed in the tea estates of Darjeeling.

No.	Title	Lyrics	Singer(s)	Length
1.	"Adaraku"	Viswa	Viswa & Chorus	4:57
2.	"Pillagali Allari"	Sirivennela Sitaramasastri	Shreya Ghoshal	4:49
3.	"Avunu Nijam"	Sirivennela Sitaramasastri	K.K, Sunitha	5:05
4.	"Chandamama"	Sirivennela Sitaramasastri	Ranjith, Mahalakshmi Iyer	5:28
5.	"Neetho Cheppana"	Sirivennela Sitaramasastri	K.S. Chithra, S. P. Balasubrahmanyam	4:33
6.	"Pilichinaa Raanantaava"	Sirivennela Sitaramasastri	Kavita Krishnamurthy, Karthik & Chorus	4:57

== Release ==
=== Domestic ===
The film released in 79 centers in Nizam region in Andhra Pradesh and was distributed by Maruthi Movies in which 3 centers screened the film for only 2 days. The film released in 24 centers across Visakhapatnam and was distributed by Sri Venkateswara Films. Sri Bharathi Pictures released the film in Krishna district in 18 centers. The film was released simultaneously on three screens in Chennai, the first Telugu film to do so.

=== Overseas ===
The film was released with 6 prints in United States and was distributed by Vishnu Mudda and Soma Kancherla of Crown DVD distribution company. Because of the demand, another print was imported from India for screening. The film's first screening in the US happened at Cine Plaza 13 at North Bergen on the night of 11 August 2005. At Connecticut, a special screening was conducted on 19 August 2005. Initially one show was planned but because of the demand another show was screened. There at the theater, a turn out of 442 people was observed which included standing audience for 434 seats and about 60 could not be accommodated. Apart from USA, the film released in selected screens in United Kingdom, Singapore, Germany and Australia.

=== Home media ===
The DVD of the movie was released by Aditya Music under its Aditya Video Brand and won the best DVD award for its quality and is considered to be one of the best selling DVDs in Tollywood. After 7 years, Star Maa renewed the contract by paying an amount of ₹3.5 crores which was a record price for a 2005 Telugu film.

=== Re-release ===
Athadu was remastered in 4K with Dolby Atmos mixing and re-released in theaters on 9 August 2025 coinciding with the 20th anniversary of the film and the 50th birthday celebrations of Babu.

== Reception ==
=== Critical reception ===
The film received praise for its plot, slick screenplay, creative action sequences, the amalgamation of humor, emotional weightage, suspense music, dialogues, cinematography and the central performance of Mahesh Babu.

Sify stated, "The highlight of the film is Mahesh Babu who looks cool, confident and competent as a hit man with his expressive body language and mannerisms. Athadu just about makes it as a slickly packaged entertainer but only for want of a better alternative." Cinegoer.net gave a review stating, "True the film gives an image of a Hollywood base for the drama. Even the taking, screenplay structure and execution of scenes, less talk and more action – all add to this image. But there are elements in this film that only a Telugu man can do it originally. That is the love track. And the way Trivikram put to view the scenic structure between Mahesh Babu and Trisha is impressive and refreshing."

=== Box office ===
The film netted ₹10 lakh from three screens in Chennai in its opening weekend debuting at second position pushing Shankar's Anniyan down to the third place. It collected approximately ₹22 crore (US$2.3 million) in its total run. The film had a 50 days run in 205 centers and a 100-day run in 38 centres. The film had a 175-day run in Sudarshan 35 mm, Hyderabad, grossing ₹1.40 crore from the theatre.

== Accolades ==
Award (Note: Awards, festivals and organizations are in alphabetical order.)	Date of ceremony (Note: Date is linked to the article about the awards held that year, wherever possible.)	Category	Recipient(s)	Result	Ref.
Filmfare Awards South	9 September 2006	Best Film – Telugu	Athadu	Nominated	
Filmfare Awards South	9 September 2006	Best Director – Telugu	Trivikram Srinivas	Won	
Filmfare Awards South	9 September 2006	Best Actor – Telugu	Mahesh Babu	Nominated	
Filmfare Awards South	9 September 2006	Best Actress – Telugu	Trisha	Nominated	
Filmfare Awards South	9 September 2006	Best Comedian – Telugu	Brahmanandam	Nominated	
Filmfare Awards South	9 September 2006	Best Music Director – Telugu	Mani Sharma	Nominated	
Filmfare Awards South	9 September 2006	Best Male Playback Singer – Telugu	Karthik (for "Pilichina Raanantaava")	Nominated	
Filmfare Awards South	9 September 2006	Best Female Playback Singer – Telugu	Shreya Ghoshal (for "Pillagali Allari")	Nominated	
Filmfare Awards South	9 September 2006	Best Female Playback Singer – Telugu	Kavita Krishnamurti (for "Pilichina Raanantaava")	Nominated	
Nandi Awards	2006	Best Actor	Mahesh Babu	Won	
Nandi Awards	2006	Best Dialogue Writer	Trivikram Srinivas	Won	
Nandi Awards	2006	Best Special Effects	C. H. Srinivas (Prasad EFX)	Won	
