= Swayamvaram (1999 film) =

- DVD cover
- Directed by: K. Vijaya Bhaskar
- Written by: Screenplay: K. Vijaya Bhaskar; Story & Dialogues: Trivikram Srinivas
- Produced by: Venkata Shyam Prasad
- Starring: Venu; Laya
- Cinematography: K. Prasad
- Edited by: Marthand K. Venkatesh
- Music by: Vandemataram Srinivas
- Production company: SP Entertainments
- Release date: 22 April 1999
- Country: India
- Language: Telugu

Swayamvaram is a 1999 Indian Telugu-language romantic comedy drama film directed by K. Vijaya Bhaskar and produced by Venkata Shyam Prasad under SP Entertainments. The film stars debutants Venu and Laya in lead roles. Swayamvaram also marks the screenwriting debut of Trivikram Srinivas who would later go on to become a noted filmmaker in Telugu cinema.

Swayamvaram won four Nandi Awards. The film was remade in Tamil as Love Marriage (2001), in Hindi as Kyaa Dil Ne Kahaa (2002) and in Kannada as Cheluve Ondu Helthini (2002).

== Plot ==
Initially, Venu and Anu despise each other. Bose asked Venu to give a singing chance to his friend Anu and then introduced her to Venu, but both were already familiar with each other due to earlier rifts. Their feelings change after frequent encounters, and love blossoms between Venu and Anu, even though Bose is also in love with Anu. When Anu's parents approach Venu with a marriage proposal, he rejects it, seeing marriage as a burden. However, Venu eventually realizes his deep love for Anu, comes to trust in marriage, and decides to marry her.

== Cast ==
- Venu as Venu
- Laya as Anu
- Giribabu as Sivaprasad, Anu's father
- Brahmaji as Bose
- Ali as Thief
- Kota Srinivasa Rao
- Kavitha
- Sudha
- M. S. Narayana
- Ironleg Sastri
- Raghunatha Reddy
- Rajitha as Swati, Vasu's wife
- Ananth as Vasu
- Ahuti Prasad as Police Official
- Dharmavarapu Subramanyam as Dr. Dhairyam
- Fightmaster Raju as himself

== Production ==
When I first listened to the story of Swayamvaram from writer Trivikram Srinivas, I sensed a novelty in that subject. Telling that point to the audience in a convincingly interesting style is pretty difficult. The hero in the film is the villain. And he is not a kind of stereotyped hero who does good things and impresses everybody. We have to convince people that hero can have weaknesses and a hero need not be perfect. It's just like a character that you see in your neighborhood. He is a normal guy with no exceptional (or heroic) qualities. It was a real challenge.

— Director Vijaya Bhaskar

Trivikram Srinivas developed the story of Swayamvaram during his early career in Hyderabad. He shared the story with producer Venkata Shyam Prasad and actor Venu, explaining its theme with the dialogue: "Prema ane swargam nundi edu adugula dooramlo vunde narakame pelli" (transl. "From the heaven called love, seven steps away lies the hell called marriage"). Impressed by the concept, Shyam Prasad decided to produce the film.

At the time, the producers were searching for a director for the project. G. Ram Prasad, a filmmaker and friend of K. Vijaya Bhaskar, introduced Vijaya Bhaskar to the team. Ram Prasad would later collaborate with Venu and Trivikram on Chirunavvutho (2001). After their initial meeting, Vijaya Bhaskar agreed to direct the film. Having previously directed Prardhana (1991), a critically acclaimed film despite its commercial failure, Vijaya Bhaskar was drawn to the unique narrative of Swayamvaram. The story stood out for its departure from traditional hero-centric plots, focusing instead on a flawed and relatable protagonist. Vijaya Bhaskar insisted that Trivikram write the dialogues.

The production was completed efficiently in less than 50 days, with Laya cast as the female lead. Despite facing challenges during production and release, Shyam Prasad took significant risks to see the project through.

== Music ==
The music for the film was composed by Vandemataram Srinivas and lyrics for the songs were penned by Bhuvanachandra.

No	Song title	Singer(s)	Writer(s)	Duration
1	"Keeravaani"	Udit Narayan, Swarnalatha	Bhuvana Chandra	04:58
2	"Vinave Cheli"	Sonu Nigam, B. Arundhathi	Bhuvana Chandra	04:20
3	"Picasso Chitrama"	S. P. Balasubrahmanyam	Bhuvana Chandra	04:58
4	"Marala Telupuna"	K. S. Chithra	Bhuvana Chandra	04:33
5	"Pellichesukora"	Mano	Bhuvana Chandra	04:38
6	"Yara Ra Roi"	Suresh Peters	Bhuvana Chandra	04:32

== Reception ==
Upon its release, Swayamvaram achieved commercial success, establishing the reputations of both Vijaya Bhaskar and Trivikram Srinivas.

== Awards ==
Award	Category	Nominee	Outcome
Nandi Awards	Best Music Director	Vandemataram Srinivas	Won
Nandi Awards	Best Female Playback Singer	K. S. Chithra	Won
Nandi Awards	Special Jury Awards	Venu; Laya	Won
