= Krishna Kumar (actor) =

Indian film actor

- Born: Krishna Kumar; Thiruvananthapuram, Kerala, India
- Occupations: Actor; politician; news presenter
- Years active: 1994–present
- Political party: Bharatiya Janata Party
- Spouse: Sindhu Krishna (m. 1994)
- Children: 4, including Ahaana

Krishna Kumar is an Indian actor, news presenter and politician, who currently serves as the Chairman and Director of the National Film Development Corporation of India since April 2026. He works predominantly in Malayalam cinema and television. He has also appeared in a few Tamil films.

== Early and personal life ==
Krishna Kumar was born in Thiruvananthapuram, Kerala, India. He is the youngest son of Gopalakrishnan Nair and Retnamma. He hails from a family who had served in the Indian Army.

Krishna Kumar met his future wife, Sindhu, during his tenure as a presenter at Doordarshan. The couple married on 12 December 1994 at the Trivandrum Club in Thiruvananthapuram. His wife, Sindhu, is an entrepreneur who runs an advertising agency.

The couple have four daughters, including Ahaana Krishna and Ishaani Krishna, both of whom are actresses, as well as Diya Krishna and Hansika Krishna.

== Acting career ==
Kumar began his acting career after receiving his first offer while working as a television news presenter for Doordarshan. His debut role was in a 13-episode Malayalam-language serial produced for DD Malayalam, in which he portrayed the son of actor Nedumudi Venu. He later appeared in the television soap opera Sthree (1998–2000), which aired on Asianet and co-starred Siddique and Vinaya Prasad.

Kumar made his film debut with the 1994 Malayalam film Kashmeeram. In the years that followed, he appeared in several Malayalam films and television serials. He later expanded his career into Tamil cinema, featuring in films such as Billa II, Deivathirumagal, and Mugamoodi.

== Political career ==
Krishna Kumar became associated with the Rashtriya Swayamsevak Sangh (RSS) in 1982. He formally joined the Bharatiya Janata Party (BJP) in February 2021. In the same year, he contested as the BJP candidate from the Thiruvananthapuram constituency in the 2021 Kerala Legislative Assembly election.

On 5 October 2021, he was elected as a member of the BJP National Council representing Kerala. He later contested as the party’s candidate from the Kollam constituency in the 2024 general election. During the election, Kumar increased the party’s vote share in Kollam by approximately 63,000 votes compared to the previous election.

== Filmography ==
=== Malayalam films ===
Year	Title	Role	Notes
1994	Kashmeeram	Unni	
1994	Sukrutham	Babu Prasad	
1994	Pakshe	Rajan	
1995	Alancheri Thamprakkal	Mahesh	
1995	Boxer	TV Reporter	
1995	Maanthrikam	Douglas	
1995	Puthukkottayile Puthumanavalan	Anandhan/John Sacaria	
1996	Aakaashathekkoru Kilivaathil		
1996	Mahathma	Rajeev	
1996	Mayoora Nritham		
1997	Irattakuttikalude Achan	Robert	
1997	Superman	Himself	
1997	Masmaram	A.S.P. Vishnu IPS	
1997	Gangothri	Sarath's assistant	
1998	Aaghosham	Unnikrishnan	
1999	Agnisakshi		
1999	Vasanthiyum Lakshmiyum Pinne Njaanum	Vinod	
1999	Veendum Chila Veettukaryangal	Businessman Anil Kurup	
1999	Pranayamazha	Louis	
2000	Arayannangalude Veedu	Hareendranath Menon	
2000	Summer Palace	Rajmohan	
2000	Manassil Oru Manjuthulli	Mohandas	
2001	Kattu Vannu Vilichappol	Unni	
2001	Sathyameva Jayathe	Reji Mathan	
2002	Swapnahalliyil Orunaal		
2002	Punyam		
2002	Aabharanacharthu		
2004	Chathikkatha Chanthu	Aravindan	
2008	Sound of Boot	Circle Inspector Aravind	
2009	Thirunakkara Perumal	Satheeshan	
2010	Paattinte Palazhy		
2011	Melvilasam	B. D. Kapoor	
2011	Makeup Man	Advocate Krishna Prasad	
2011	Collector	Chandran	
2012	Run Baby Run	Vijaya Kumar	
2012	Molly Aunty Rocks!	Ravi	
2013	Lokpal	Ramesh	
2013	Ladies & Gentleman	Sibi Zakkariah	
2013	3 Dots	Mathew Paul	
2013	Vishudhan	Cleetus	
2013	Good Bad & Ugly	Murthy Raj	
2014	Salaam Kashmier	Captain Satheesh	
2014	Gamer	Zakeer Ali	
2016	Marupadi		
2017	1971: Beyond Borders	Sudharshan	
2017	Careful	Sudeep	
2017	Velipadinte Pusthakam	Cameramen	
2018	Shikkari Shambhu	Ranger Vasu	
2018	Parole	Sandeep Raj	
2018	Orayiram Kinakkalal	Stephen	
2018	Mohanlal	Meenukutti's father	
2018	Theekuchiyum Panithulliyum	Hari	
2018	A for Apple	Advocate Ram Mohan	
2018	Moonnara	CI Velraj	
2019	Rameshan Oru Peralla	Public Prosecutor	
2021	One	Alex Thomas IPS, Vigilance Director	
2022	Shefeekkinte Santhosham	Shefeek's father	
2023	Thrishanku	Robin	

=== Tamil films ===
Year	Title	Role	Notes
2008	Sathyam	Mohammed	Simultaneously shot in Telugu as Salute
2012	Billa II	Raghubir Sinha	
2012	Mugamoodi	Commissioner	Uncredited
2012	Mazhaikkalam	Suresh	
2011	Kaavalan	Karthik	
2011	Deiva Thirumagal	Victor	
2016	Manithan	Vijay Nair	
2016	Zero	Koran	
2017	Laali		

=== Television ===
Year	Film	Role	Role	Language	Notes
1997	Grihapravesham		Asianet	Malayalam	
1998–2000	Sthree	Vijayan	Asianet	Malayalam	
1999–2000	Sindhoorakkuruvi		Surya TV	Malayalam	
2000	Charulatha		Surya TV	Malayalam	
2000–2001	Sreeraman Sreedevi		Asianet	Malayalam	
2001–2003	Manasaputhri		Surya TV	Malayalam	
2001–2003	Vasundara Medicals		Asianet	Malayalam	
2003	Seethalakshmi		Asianet	Malayalam	
2003–2004	Swantham		Asianet	Malayalam	
2002	Vivahita		Asianet	Malayalam	
2004	Kadamattathu Kathanaar	Nicholas	Asianet	Malayalam	
2006	Malayogam	Anand	Asianet	Malayalam	
	Miss Mary Theresa Paul		Doordarshan	Malayalam	Telefilm
	Pravachanam		Doordarshan	Malayalam	Telefilm
	Panthalayaniyilekku Oru Yathra		Doordarshan	Malayalam	Telefilm
2009–2010	Thangam	Selvakannan	Sun TV	Tamil	
2010	Abirami	Abhirami's husband	Kalaignar TV	Tamil	
2021	Koodevide	Prof. Adhi	Asianet	Malayalam	
