= Darling Darling (2001 film) =

- DVD cover
- Directed by: V. Samudra
- Written by: V. Samudra; Diwakar Babu (dialogues)
- Based on: Darling Darling (Malayalam)
- Produced by: Medikonda Murali Krishna
- Starring: Srikanth; Shaheen Khan; Sai Kiran
- Cinematography: Navakanth
- Music by: Koti
- Production company: Sri Venkata Ramana Productions
- Release date: 30 December 2001
- Country: India
- Language: Telugu

Darling.. Darling... is a 2001 Indian Telugu-language romantic drama film directed by V. Samudra. A remake of the 2000 Malayalam film of the same name, the film stars Srikanth, Shaheen Khan and Sai Kiran.

== Cast ==
- Srikanth as Chinni Krishna
- Shaheen Khan as Hema / Latha
- Sai Kiran as Kiran
- Giri Babu as P.K. Rao
- Chandra Mohan as Pedarayudu
- Kota Srinivasa Rao as Srinivasa Rao
- M. S. Narayana as Swamy
- Kaikala Satyanarayana as Hema's uncle
- Annapoorna as Rajyalakshmi
- Varsha as Saraswathi
- Gundu Hanumantha Rao as STD/ISD Booth Owner
- Sudhakar as Sudhakar aka Sudha
- Dharmavarapu Subramanyam as Doctor
- Delhi Rajeswari as Savithri
- Vinod as Ravi
- Prasanna Kumar as Prathap

== Production ==
Medikonda Murali Krishna, who produced Suryudu and Narasimha Naidu (both remakes), produced this film. After a string of failures, Srikanth changed his hairstyle for the film. The climax was shot at Rajamahendravaram.

== Soundtrack ==
The soundtrack was composed by Koti. The song "Nari Nari" is loosely based on "Nari Narain" by Egyptian singer Hisham Abbas.

Track listing
No.	Title	Lyrics	Singer(s)	Length
1.	"F Chanallo"	Chandrabose	Raghu	4:00
2.	"Kila Kila Kila Kokila"	Sri Harsha	Sriram Prabhu, Mallikarjun, Gopika Poornima	4:31
3.	"Naa Prema Nuvvani"	Ravi Mohan	Sriram Prabhu, Sunitha Upadrashta	4:18
4.	"Nari Nari"	Bhuvana Chandra	Tippu, K. S. Chithra	4:22
5.	"Titanic"	Chirravuri Vijaykumar	Tippu, Sunitha Upadrashta	4:01
6.	"Vandamandi Brahmalanta"	Chirravuri Vijaykumar	S. P. B. Charan, Ganga	4:59
Total length:				26:11

== Release and reception ==
The film was scheduled to release on Diwali.

Jeevi of Idlebrain.com opined that "The film is one of the worst films that are made in the recent past. There is no imagination in screenplay or direction". Gudipoodi Srihari of The Hindu wrote that "Saikiran's character looks foolish. Srikant, playing a sadist role, is unimpressive, particularly in closeup shots" and that "Shaheen is a mere doll". A critic from Full Hyderabad wrote that "Darling Darling has a plot so complicated that only two persons in the cast finally understand what has happened, and those two do not include the heroine or the hero".
