= Prema Oka Maikam =

- Telugu language poster
- Directed by: Chandu
- Screenplay by: Chandu; Pulagam Chinnarayana
- Story by: Chandu
- Produced by: Venkata Suresh; Srikanth Surya
- Starring: Charmy Kaur; Rahul Haridas
- Edited by: V. Nagireddy
- Music by: M.G.K. Praveen; SR Posam
- Production company: Touring Talkies
- Release date: 30 August 2013
- Running time: 174 min
- Country: India
- Language: Telugu

Prema Oka Maikam (transl. Love is an illusion) is a 2013 Indian Telugu-language film directed by Chandu. It was released on 30 August 2013 and stars Charmy Kaur, Rahul, and Saranya Nag as the lead characters. The film's script was written by Chandu and Pulagam Chinnarayana, who worked as the script's dialogue writer.

Prema Oka Maikam has been described as "a film for men, especially for those men who enjoy being drowsy and drowned into love, lust or wine" and Chandu commented that Charmy "has given soul to the character and will win all the hearts".

== Synopsis ==
The film follows Mallika (Charmy Kaur) an intelligent and independent young woman that works as a call girl but refuses to take just any man that comes along. When poet Lalith (Rahul) and Mallika have a chance meeting, the two connect instantly. Swathi (Saranya Nag) is a singer that gained her popularity after appearing on a television talent show, but ends up getting drawn into a love triangle between Mallika and Lalith.

== Cast ==
- Charmy Kaur as Mallika
- Rahul Haridas as Lalith
- Saranya Nag as Swathi
- Ravi Babu
- Rao Ramesh as Vamshi
- Giri Babu
- Chandra Mohan
- Thagubothu Ramesh
- Surekha Vani
- Jackie
- Prudhvi Raj
- Chanti
- Satish
- Sony Charishta
- Saraswati Amma

== Production ==
Development on Prema Oka Maikam began in 2012 and Charmi Kaur was announced to perform one of the lead roles. Chandu denied claims that Kaur was hired to "boost the movie's glamour quotient" and stated that they chose her because they believed that she could perform the role and that "we felt she was apt, but not because to add glamour". Footage for Prema Oka Maikam was shot in Bangalore and Hyderabad and the film went into post production in early 2013. The film initially had a projected release date of February 2013, but was pushed back to an August release.

The film's music was written by MGK Praveen who composed three songs for "Prema Oka Maikam" and the other three songs were composed by SR Posam.

== Soundtrack ==
No.	Title	Singer(s)	Length
1.	"Prema Oka Maikam"	Deepu, Hansika
2.	"Baby Baby Naalo"	Bhargavi Pilaye
3.	"Swachamaina Prematho"	Charmi, Deepu
4.	"Ragala Megham"	Usha
5.	"Middle Drop"	Suri P.
6.	"Priyuni Chirunama"	Bhargavi Pillaye

== Reception ==
IndiaGlitz panned the movie, remarking that it was "easily the year's worst ever movie". The reviewer commented that the background music was "annoying and highly inappropriate", and that the narration was "downright stupid".
