= Nandi Award for Best Book on Telugu Cinema =

Indian film award

This is the list of winners of the Nandi Award for Best Book on Telugu Cinema since 1995, when award for this category was first instituted.

Year	Winner	Book	Ref
2016	Pulagam Chinnarayana	Pasidi Thera	
2015	Dr. Paidipal	Telugu Cinemallo Dubbing Paatalu	
2014	V. Pramod Kumar; Prabhakar Jaini	Tera Venuka Telugu Cinema; Naa Cinema Censor Ayipoindoch	
2013	Nandagopal	Cinema Ga Cinema	
2012	P. Ravichandra	Prasthaanam	
2011	Sri Eeaswar	Cinema Posters	
2010	Dr. Paidipala	Geya Kavula Charitra	
2009	Pulagam Chinnarayana	Aanati Aanavallu	
2008	Dr. Ramalakshmi Arudra	Arudra Cine Mini Kaburlu	
2007	TL Kantha Rao; TS Jagan Mohan; T Sreekanth	Anaganaga Oka Raakumarudu	
2006	S. V. Rama Rao	Naati Neti Nootokka Chitralu	
2005	Kasi Viswanath	Cinema Rachana – Konni Moulika Amsalu	
2004	Raavi Kondala Rao	Black and White	
2002	B. Venkateshwarlu	Telugu Cinema Vythalikulu	
2001	Vasiraju Prakasam	Cine Bharatam	
1999	S. V. Rama Rao	Telugu Tera	
1998	Chimmani Manohar	Cinema Scripts, Rachana Silpam	
1997	T. Udaywarlu	Thaaraa Thoranam	
1996	C. Narayana Reddy	Patalo Emundhi	
1995	K. N. T. Sastry	Alanati Chalana Chitram	

== See also ==
- Nandi Awards
