= Saranya Nag =

Indian actress

- Born: Chennai, India
- Occupation: Actress
- Years active: 2004–2014

Saranya Nag is an Indian former actress who has appeared in Tamil language films. She made her debut in a supporting role in Balaji Sakthivel's critically acclaimed Kaadhal (2004), before playing leading roles in Peraanmai (2009) and Mazhaikkalam (2012).

== Career ==
Saranya was born and brought up in Chennai, Tamil Nadu. She finished her schooling at Durga Matriculation and Higher Secondary School, Kodambakkam.

Saranya acted as a child artist in Nee Varuvai Ena. She was in Class IX, when cinematographer Vijay Milton referred her on to Balaji Sakthivel who had subsequently cast her in Kaadhal. She was initially considered to play the heroine in the film, but the role was later handed to Sandhya, after the director felt she looked too young. She thus made her debut in a supporting role in the film as Sandhya's friend, and the film went on to win critical and commercial acclaim. Her role was well received and prompted a producer to sign her on for the lead role in a Oru Vaarthai Pesu, but the film was later shelved. She followed this up with the lead role in a low-budget Telugu film titled 10th Class. After appearing in another low-budget production Vilayattu, Saranya went on to appear as one of the five girls alongside Vasundra and Dhansika in S. P. Jananathan's Peraanmai, which featured Jayam Ravi in the lead role and won positive reviews. After the success of Peraanmai, she signed several projects, including Thiruvasagam with Aryan Rajesh and Saravana Kudil with Tarun Gopi, but the films failed to materialize. Thiruvasagam was revived in 2013 and its title was changed to Eera Veyyil.

Her solo lead role came in Mazhaikaalam directed by Deepan, its director and co-starring newcomer Sriram. Prior to release, the film made the headlines after it was reported that Saranya would appear nude in a crucial scene. Saranya then clarified that she wore a skin-toned costume, and the scene was shot aesthetically. In 2013 she appeared in two Telugu films, Prema Oka Maikam.

== Filmography ==
Films

Year	Film	Role	Language	Notes
1998	Kaadhal Kavithai	Jothi's friend	Tamil	As child artiste
1999	Nee Varuvai Ena	Unknown	Tamil	As child artiste
2003	Enakku 20 Unakku 18	College student	Tamil	
2003	Nee Manasu Naaku Telusu	College student	Telugu	
2004	Kaadhal	Saranya	Tamil	
2005	Chidambarathil Oru Appasamy	Thenmozhi's sister	Tamil	
2006	Thullura Vayasu	Cherin	Tamil	
2006	10th Class	Anjali	Telugu	
2008	Vilayattu	Priya	Tamil	
2009	Peraanmai	Ajitha	Tamil	
2012	Mazhaikkalam	Sophia	Tamil	
2013	Prema Oka Maikam	Swathi	Telugu	
2013	Doosukeltha	Ashtalakshmi	Telugu	
2014	Rettai Vaalu	Anjali	Tamil	
2014	Eera Veyyil	Priya	Tamil	
2014	Muyal		Tamil	

Short films

- Bodhai
- Marai Nahal

Television

Year	Serial	Role	Channel	Notes
2004	Kanavugal Aayiram	college student	Jaya TV	appeared in episode 2
