= Mazhaikkalam =

2012 Indian film by Deepan

- Poster
- Directed by: Deepan
- Starring: Sriram; Saranya Nag
- Music by: Songs: Prem Anand; Score: Johnson
- Production company: AR Screen (p) Ltd
- Release date: 6 April 2012
- Country: India
- Language: Tamil

Mazhaikkalam (transl. Rainy season) is a 2012 Indian Tamil-language romantic drama film directed by Deepan and starring newcomer Sanjeevan, credited as Sriram, and Saranya Nag.

== Cast ==
- Sriram as Vijay
- Saranya Nag as Sophia
- Ganja Karuppu
- Krishna Kumar as Vijay's brother
- Jaya Sri as Vijay's sister-in-law
- Vel Chinnaswamy
- Winner Ramachandran

== Production ==
The film is directed by Deepan, who worked under R. B. Choudary. Debutante Sanjeevan and Saranya Nag play college students in the film. In an interview, Deepan expressed how he was not satisfied with the final outcome of the film. The film began production in 2010. Prior to release, the film made the headlines after it was reported that Saranya would appear nude in a crucial scene. Saranya then clarified that she wore a skin-toned costume, and the scene was shot aesthetically.

== Reception ==
A critic from The Times of India wrote that "Unfortunately, it is in this area [the script] that “Mazhaikkalam” falters. Debutant director Deepan’s construction of scenes is not only dull but also very predictable. Malathi Rangarajan of The Hindu opined that "If director Deepan had lent the same amount of concentration [that he gave to the last fifteen minutes] to the rest of the film, Mazhaikaalam could have been a thumbs-up show. But the narration lacks cohesion". A critic from The New Indian Express said that "Mazhaikalam is an example of good intentions going haywire". A critic from Behindwoods said that "Mazhaikkalam seems to have started off as a very interesting one line story" and added that "the makers ought to have developed their nutshell idea into a full fledged script which had interesting moments throughout".
