= Shahjahan (film) =

2001 film by K. S. Ravi

- Theatrical release poster
- Directed by: Ravi
- Written by: N. Prasanna Kumar
- Screenplay by: Ravi
- Story by: Ravi
- Produced by: R. B. Choudary
- Starring: Vijay; Richa Pallod; Krishna
- Cinematography: Arthur A. Wilson; S. Saravanan (1 Song)
- Edited by: V. Jaishankar
- Music by: Mani Sharma
- Production company: Super Good Films
- Release date: 14 November 2001
- Running time: 156 minutes
- Country: India
- Language: Tamil

Shahjahan is a 2001 Indian Tamil-language romantic drama film written and directed by Ravi (in his directorial debut) and produced by R. B. Choudary. The film stars Vijay and Richa Pallod (in her Tamil debut) in the lead roles, while Krishna, Vivek and Kovai Sarala portray supporting roles. The film, which had music was composed by Mani Sharma.

The film was released on 14 November 2001. The story is about the challenges faced by a relationship expert in his own love life. The film was a moderate success and it completed 125 days theatrical run in theatres across Tamil Nadu.

== Plot ==
Ashok assists couples in eloping despite the opposition of their families. He is supported by his companions, Boopathi Ramaiyaa and Seenu.

Amidst his endeavors, Ashok's own heart becomes entangled when he encounters Uma Maheshwari, affectionately known as Mahee, a brilliant engineering student whose presence captivates him deeply. Despite having a profound crush on Mahee, Ashok stays silent, haunted by a traumatic incident involving his dear friend, Giri.

In a poignant flashback, the audience is confronted with Giri's tragic tale of unrequited love. Giri's affection for Aisha, a young Muslim woman, ended in heartbreak and tragedy when she tragically took her own life in the face of societal scorn and familial discord triggered by Giri's declaration of love. This, in turn, caused Giri to go insane and end up in a mental hospital.

When Ashok's friend Raja asks for his help in winning over a mysterious lady, Ashok altruistically agrees, unaware that the enigmatic maiden is none other than Mahee herself. As Raja and Mahee's clandestine romance blossoms, Ashok remains blissfully unaware of their burgeoning affection.

However, when Mahee's father discovers their relationship, the young couple turns to Ashok once more, seeking refuge in his expertise. Oblivious to Raja's intentions, Ashok pledges his assistance, unwittingly facilitating Raja's pursuit of Mahee. The revelation strikes Ashok with devastating force as Mahee stands before him, ready to elope with Raja.

Consumed by anguish and heartache, Ashok's world shatters as he realizes the depth of his sacrifice. Despite his torment, Ashok exhibits remarkable resilience and selflessness, orchestrating Raja and Mahee's union even as his own heart breaks.

As the newlyweds flee to Coimbatore to escape Mahee's father's wrath, tragedy strikes once more. In a harrowing confrontation, Mahee's father unleashes his fury upon the trio, culminating in a brutal assault on Ashok. Despite the searing pain of betrayal, Ashok valiantly shields his friends, sacrificing his own safety for their happiness.

The film culminates in a poignant tableau, with Ashok wounded and broken, yet undeterred in his mission to unite kindred souls. As a stranger beseeches him for aid in matters of the heart, Ashok, with a heavy heart, offers his unwavering assistance, embodying the timeless adage that true love knows no bounds, even in the face of personal anguish and sacrifice.

== Cast ==
- Vijay as Ashok
- Richa Pallod as Uma Maheshwari "Mahee"
- Vivek as Boopathi Ramaiyaa
- Kovai Sarala as Jingili
- Krishna as Raja
- Meena in a special appearance in the song, "Sarakka Vachirukkan"
- Nizhalgal Ravi as Ilango, Ashok's father
- Devan as Mahee's father
- Ajay Rathnam as Minister
- Thadi Balaji as Seenu
- Sashikumar as Giri
- Kovai Babu as Ashok's friend
- Shanmugasundaram as Aisha's father
- Pandu as Lawyer
- Mathrubootham as Dr. M. Das
- Ilavarasu as Police Inspector
- Scissor Manohar as College Peon
- Chaplin Balu as Bhoopathi's friend
- Kaka Gopal
- Raneesh as Groom
- Sirish as Sirish
- Pasi Sathya as Muniyamma
- Jaya Murali as Ashok's mother
- Janaki Sabesh as Mahee's mother
- Sona Heiden as Sujatha, Uma's friend
- Banu Balasubramaniam as Giri's mother
- Varsha as Aisha
- Vaani as Aisha's mother
- Padma Chowdary as Sirish's lover
- Shobi as dancer in the song "Kadhal Oru"
- Sridhar as dancer in the song "Kadhal Oru"
- Aruldoss as Bhoopathi's friend (uncredited)
- Marthandan as Family planning officer (uncredited)

== Production ==
R. B. Choudary, after the successes of Poove Unakkaga (1996), Love Today (1997) and Thullatha Manamum Thullum (1999), signed on Vijay for a project to be directed by Vikraman. However, Vijay opted against starring in Vikraman's venture and Ravi Appulu was roped in to make a film titled Sneha Jahan, which later became Shahjahan, named after the fifth Mughal emperor with the same name. The director had previously approached Vikram with the script of the film. Asin was approached to play the lead heroine before finalizing Richa Pallod. Although the story takes place in Chennai, the movie was predominantly shot only in Vishakhapatnam but 50% of the film's portions were shot in Chennai as well. Arthur A. Wilson was signed to handle the camera, Mani Sharma to compose the music, Vairamuthu to write lyrics while Prabhakaran did the art work and Prasanna Kumar has written the dialogue.

== Soundtrack ==
The soundtrack of the film was composed by Mani Sharma, and all lyrics were penned by Vairamuthu. The song "Minnalai Pidithu" is based on the theme of The Ghost and the Darkness (1996).

Song	Singer	Lyrics	Notes
"Achchacho Punnagai"	Udit Narayan, Kavita Krishnamurthy	Vairamuthu	based on "Ammaye Sannaga" from Kushi
"Kadhal Oru"	KK	Vairamuthu	based on "Ye Mera Jaha" from Kushi
"Manidha Manidha"	Srinivas	Vairamuthu	
"May Madham"	Devan Ekambaram, Sujatha Mohan	Vairamuthu	
"Mellinamae Mellinamae"	Harish Raghavendra	Vairamuthu	
"Minnalai Pidithu"	Unni Menon	Vairamuthu	
"Sarakku Vachirukken"	Shankar Mahadevan, Radhika Shashi	Vairamuthu	based on "Aata Kaavala" from Annayya

== Release ==
Shahjahan was released on 14 November 2001.

== Reception ==
Malathi Rangarajan from The Hindu gave the film a positive review claiming that "youth, romance and vibrant music seem to sell at a premium these days" and that Shahjahan "has all these in ample measure". She added that Richa "has little to do but look good" and Vijay "sparkles in the role of Ashok" while Krishna "fills the bill of a perfect non-action hero". Ananda Vikatan rated the film 36 out of 100 and wrote that the makers have erected a puppet Taj Mahal with this Shahjahan as a succession of predictable scenes and weak incidents. Visual Dasan of Kalki rated the film "above average". Chennai Online wrote "The film opens promisingly enough, with a well choreographed stunt scene, giving hope of more thrills to follow. The story, of a youth who helps out lovers-in-distress, but falters when it comes to his own matters-of-the-heart, had potential to turn into an engaging entertainer. But the first-time director thrusts in a lot of contrived situations, and makes his hero a loser in the end".
