= Vasiraju Prakasam =

Indian film critic, journalist and producer

- Born: Andhra Pradesh, India
- Occupations: Producer; Film Critic

Vasiraju Prakasam is an Indian film critic, journalist and producer known for his works predominantly in Telugu cinema, and has produced Tele-serials in Doordarshan. He has produced films such as Kalam Marindi, Balaraju Katha, and Bapujee Bharatam. He has served as the Jury for Best writing on cinema at the 54th National Film Awards He won three Nandi Awards.

He was a feature editor for the Telugu daily Vaartha and Andhra Pradesh Film Chamber magazine. He served as a Jury member for International Film Festival of India, International Children's Film Festival, and Film Star Charity Cricket Association.

== Awards ==
National Film Awards

- National Film Award for Best Film Critic - 2000
- National Film Award Best Writing on Cinema - Special Mention - 2003

Nandi Awards

- Best Feature Film - Gold - Kalam Marindi (1972)
- Best Film Critic on Telugu Cinema (1999)
- Best Book on Telugu Cinema - Cine Bhetalam (2001)
