= Malliswari (2004 film) =

2004 Telugu film by K. Vijaya Bhaskar

- Film poster
- Directed by: K. Vijaya Bhaskar
- Written by: Screenplay: K. Vijaya Bhaskar; Story & Dialogues: Trivikram Srinivas
- Produced by: D. Suresh Babu
- Starring: Venkatesh; Katrina Kaif
- Cinematography: Sameer Reddy
- Edited by: A. Sreekar Prasad
- Music by: Koti
- Production company: Suresh Productions
- Release date: 18 February 2004
- Running time: 155 minutes
- Country: India
- Language: Telugu

Malliswari is a 2004 Indian Telugu-language romantic comedy film directed by K. Vijaya Bhaskar and produced by D. Suresh Babu under Suresh Productions. The script was co-written by Vijaya Bhaskar and Trivikram Srinivas. It stars Venkatesh and Katrina Kaif (in the titular role, marking her Telugu debut), with music composed by Koti. The film follows Malliswari, a young heiress on the run from her scheming relatives, who finds an unlikely protector in a desperate bachelor, Prasad.

Released on 18 February 2004, Malliswari was a commercial success. It won two Nandi Awards for Best Home Viewing Feature Film and Best Dialogue Writer. It was later remade in Kannada as Kodagana Koli Nungitha (2008).

== Plot ==
Malliswari is the heiress of Raja of Mirzapur. Her deceased father wrote in his will that she would inherit the property worth ₹750 crore (equivalent to ₹29 billion or US$300 million in 2026) after she becomes major at the age of 21. The entire property is under the control of Bhavani Shankar, who wants to inherit the entire property by killing her. As he hatches the plans to eliminate Malliswari, she is sent to her uncle's in Visakhapatnam as a normal girl so that she can live with anonymity. Prasad works as a bank accountant in Andhra Bank there. He is a bachelor who has been continuously seeking for marriage alliance for the past seven years, and is growing increasingly desperate. He accidentally meets Malliswari and falls deeply in love with her. Malliswari is traced by the goons there and they start running after her. Prasad escorts her and drops her safely in Hyderabad. The rest of the story describes what happens next and the eventual conclusion of the plot.

== Cast ==
- Venkatesh as Tathineni Veera Venkata Vara Prasad aka Pellikani Prasad, an unmarried bank employee
- Katrina Kaif as Malliswari, Princess of Mirzapuram who disguises as a maid
- Kota Srinivasa Rao as Bhavani Shankar
- Brahmanandam as Balu
- Sunil as Padmanabham "Paddu"
- Naresh as Prasad's elder brother
- Tanikella Bharani as Murthy
- M. S. Narayana as Krishnaveni's husband (Cameo)
- Dharmavarapu Subrahmanyam as Bank Manager Shankar Rao
- Mallikarjuna Rao as Prasad's paternal uncle
- M. Balaiah as Ram Mohan Rao (Malliswari's grandfather)
- Ahuti Prasad as Malliswari's paternal uncle
- Chalapati Rao as Raghav Rao
- Banerjee as an assassin to kill Malliswari
- Raghunatha Reddy as Police Officer
- C. V. L. Narasimha Rao as Lawyer
- Devadas Kanakala as Lawyer
- Prabhu as Bobby (Bhavani Shankar's son)
- Chittajalu Lakshmipati as Ice Cream vendor
- Chitram Srinu as Peon Seenu
- Sarika Ramachandra Rao as Auto Driver
- Gundu Sudarshan as Marriage Broker
- Gautam Raju as Cashier Subba Rao
- Chitti Babu as Vegetable Vendor
- Bandla Ganesh as Drunker
- Smita as an assassin to kill Malliswari
- Hema as Krishnaveni
- Rajya Lakshmi as Prasad's sister-in-law
- Rajitha as Murthy's wife
- Shanoor Sana as Malliswari's paternal aunty
- Uma as Lakshmi
- Padma Jayanth as Bhavani Shankar's wife
- Priyanka
- Master Rohit as Siddharth (boy in the library)
- Baby Greeshma as Dolly
- Gajala as Monalisa (Cameo)

== Production ==
K. Vijaya Bhaskar scripted the film form an original story given by Trivikram Srinivas, who also provided the dialogue. The film was reportedly inspired by the 1953 film Roman Holiday. Cinematography and editing are performed by Sameer Reddy and A. Sreekar Prasad respectively.

Yana Gupta was originally chosen to portray the role of princess but was later replaced by Katrina Kaif. Kaif was paid ₹70 lakh for her role in the film, thereby becoming the highest paid South Indian actress at the time. The second schedule was held at Visakhapatnam. The song "Gundello Gulabila" was picturised at Bangkok while the song "Nee Navvule" was filmed at Goa. Two of the songs "Chelisoku" and "Janma Janmala" were shot at New Zealand.

== Soundtrack ==
Malliswari

Film score by Koti
- Released: 2004
- Genre: Soundtrack
- Length: 26:43
- Label: Aditya Music
- Producer: Koti

Koti chronology
Anandama Andamaye (2004)	Malliswari (2004)	Swetha Naagu (2004)

The music was composed by Koti. The song "Gundello Gulabila Mullu" is based on Rhythm Divine. The music was released on Aditya Music. The audio was launched on 30 January 2004 at 10 Downing Street pub.

No.	Title	Lyrics	Singer(s)	Length
1.	"Nuvventa Andagattevaina"	Sirivennela Sitarama Sastry	Karthik	4:48
2.	"Nee Navvule Vennelani"	Sirivennela Sitarama Sastry	Kumar Sanu, Sunitha	4:11
3.	"Gundello Gulabila"	Sirivennela Sitarama Sastry	Shankar Mahadevan, K. S. Chithra	4:16
4.	"Cheli Soku"	Sirivennela Sitarama Sastry	KK, K. S. Chithra	4:02
5.	"Janma Janmala"	Bhuvanachandra	S. P. Balasubrahmanyam, Shreya Ghoshal	5:06
6.	"Nuvu Evvari Edalo"	Sirivennela Sitarama Sastry	S. P. Balasubrahmanyam	4:06
Total length:				26:43

== Release and reception ==
The film was released on 18 February 2004.

Idlebrain wrote, "First half is very interesting with series of hilarious scenes. The emotion catches up in the scene where a pressmeet is held in second half to announce Malliswari as the heiress to the 750 crore property. The same emotion is carried till the climax of the film. The climax is very impressive. The strength of the film are dialogues by Trivikram, direction of Vijaya Bhaskar and histrionics by Venkatesh who managed the entire show single-handedly. The only thing that does not live up to the high expectations are the songs in the film. The narration of the film is slow, just like any other Vijaya Bhaskar's films". Deccan Herald wrote "Coming from the stable of Suresh Productions, it provides entertainment if you are not looking for deep plots. The story appears cliched and screenplay lacks intensity at times, yet, the movie manages to steer clear of winsomeness with its flow of gags".

== Awards ==
Nandi Awards

- Best Home Viewing Feature Film - D. Suresh Babu
- Best Dialogue Writer - Trivikram Srinivas
