= Nandagopal =

Nadella Nandagopal
- Born: 1934; Repalle
- Died: 22 June 2018 (aged 83–84); Hyderabad
- Education: Andhra University
- Occupations: Film Journalist; Film Critic
- Years active: 1965–2014
- Spouse: Kalpana Devi
- Website: http://cinemagacinema.blogspot.in

Nadella Nandagopal, was an Indian film journalist, editor and critic. He was married to Kalpana Devi, also of Repalle, and the couple had three children- Nadella Gopichand, Nadella Pratyagatma and Koduru Kavitha. As a prolific publisher, with more than forty years of experience. Nandagopal was involved in film journalism workshops, and was associated with L. V. Prasad, B.Nagi Reddy, and Aluri Chakrapani. He was even closely associated with N.T.R. during his political and film phase, where Nandagopal used to be beside him all the time. He was awarded two Nandi awards given by the State Government of Andhra Pradesh. He was even designated as the Censor Board Of India President for 12 years.

During the early phase of his career he was a member of NFDC, and CBFC. In 2013, he has garnered the National Film Award for Best Book on Cinema for his book on global cinema titled Cinema Ga Cinema at the 61st National Film Awards.

He died on 22 June 2018. He won two Nandi Awards.

== Awards ==
National Film Awards

- National Film Award for Best Book on Cinema (2013) - Cinema Ga Cinema

Nandi Awards

- Best Book on Telugu Cinema - Cinema Ga Cinema (2013)
- Best Film Critic on Telugu Cinema - 1995

Other honors

- 1997 Meghasandesam – Best Film Critic Award
- 2000 Dasari Narayana Rao gold medal - Best Film Journalist
- 2007 Twin Cities Telugu Cinema Diamond Jubilee Felicitation
- 2013 Senior Film Journalist Award - South Indian Film Chamber of Commerce
