= Nandi Award for Best Film Critic =

Indian film award

The Nandi Award for Best Film Critic was instituted in 1995. This is the complete list of the recipients in this category since then.

Year	Critic
2016	Vijay Prasad Vatti
2015	Dr. Kampella Ravichandran
2014	Pulagam Chinnarayana
2013	Vamsi Krishna
2012	Mamidi Harikrishna
2011	Rentala Jayadeva
2010	Chakravarthy
2007	Challa Srinivas
2006	Challa Srinivas
2005	Mohan Goteti
2004	M. D. Abdul
2003	Reddi Hanumantha Rao
2002	I. Arjun Rao
2001	Mohan Goteti
2000	Bhageeratha
1999	Vasiraju Prakasam
1998	Prabhu
1997	G. Bhageeratha
1996	Gowtham
1995	Nandagopal
