= Shaheen Khan (Indian actress) =

Indian actress

- Born: Shaheen Khan; Mumbai
- Occupation: Actress
- Years active: 2000–2002

Shaheen Khan is an Indian former actress who has appeared in Telugu, Tamil, and Kannada films.

== Career ==
She is known for her role in Chiru Navvutho (2001). She reprised her role in the film's remakes as well.

She has also appeared in music videos for Shankar Mahadevan, and has worked as a model with Fair & Lovely.

Shaheen Khan later quit the film industry after her marriage.

== Filmography ==
Year	Film	Role	Language	Notes	Ref.
2000	Chiru Navvutho	Sandhya	Telugu		
2001	Premakke Sai	Sandhya	Kannada	Remake of Chiru Navvuto	
2001	Darling Darling	Hemalatha	Telugu		
2002	Youth	Sandhya	Tamil	Remake of Chiru Navvuto	
