= Premakke Sai =

2001 film by A. Kodandarami Reddy

- VCD cover
- Directed by: A. Kodandarami Reddy
- Story by: Trivikram Srinivas
- Based on: Chiru Navvutho (Telugu)
- Produced by: C. Aswini Dutt
- Starring: V. Ravichandran; Shaheen Khan; Kasthuri; Prakash Raj
- Cinematography: G. S. V. Seetharam
- Edited by: Shyam Yadav
- Music by: Mani Sharma
- Production company: Vyjayanthi Movies
- Release date: 5 October 2001
- Running time: 148 minutes
- Country: India
- Language: Kannada

Premakke Sai (transl. Yes To Love) is a 2001 Indian Kannada-language romantic comedy film directed by A. Kodandarami Reddy which marked his debut in Kannada films. The film was produced by C. Aswini Dutt. The film stars V. Ravichandran, Shaheen Khan, Prakash Rai and Kasthuri.

The film was a remake of Telugu film Chiru Navvutho (2000) directed by G. Ram Prasad and written by Trivikram Srinivas. The film was also remade in Tamil as Youth (2002). The music was composed by Mani Sharma who composed for the other two languages as well.

== Cast ==
- V. Ravichandran as Venu
- Sandhya Khan as Sandhya
- Prakash Raj
- Kasthuri as Vedha
- Srinath
- Sihi Kahi Chandru
- Sadhu Kokila
- Ramesh Bhat
- Sanketh Kashi
- Malathi
- Padma Vasanthi
- Bhavyasri Rai

== Soundtrack ==
The music was composed by Mani Sharma and lyrics written by K. Kalyan. A total of 7 tracks have been composed for the film and the audio rights brought by Ashwini Audio. The song "Premada Lokada" is based on "Ye Mera Jaha" from Kushi. The songs "Olavu", "Santhosha Sambrama" and "Anda Nin Hesara" were retained from original Telugu film Chiru Navvutho. The song "Chanchala", which was not included in the film, was later remade by Sharma as "Malligai Malligai" for Tamil film Arasu and as "Chinnaga" for Telugu film Tagore.

Track listing
| No. | Title | Singer(s) | Length |
|---|---|---|---|
| 1. | "Premada Lokada" | KK | 04:48 |
| 2. | "Chammak Chammak" | S. P. Balasubrahmanyam, Mahalakshmi Iyer | 05:25 |
| 3. | "Olavu Shuruvayitu" | Hariharan, K. S. Chithra | 04:35 |
| 4. | "Santhosha Sambhrama" | S. P. Balasubrahmanyam | 04:25 |
| 5. | "Chanchala Chanchala" | K. Muralidhar, Nanditha | 05:19 |
| 6. | "Munjane Mussanje" | S. P. Balasubrahmanyam | 02:17 |
| 7. | "Anda Ninna Hesara" | Udit Narayan, Neha | 04:30 |
| 8. | "Century" | Rajesh | 04:50 |

== Reception ==
Chitraloka.com wrote, "In the days of action, vulgar and nonsensical films ‘Premakke Sai’ stands out as an example how a love subject could be neatly treated and served to the audience". A critic from Sify wrote, "Ravichandran is the only saving grace of an otherwise idiotic romantic mush".
