= Eera Veyyil =

2014 Indian film by A. K. Micheal

- Directed by: A. K. Micheal
- Written by: A. K. Micheal
- Produced by: Durai Prabhakaran; Ramesh Ethiraja; A. K. Michel; T. Neduman; Bhaveskumar K. Jain; R. Senthilkumar
- Starring: Aryan Rajesh; Saranya Nag
- Cinematography: S. D. Raameshwaran
- Edited by: Suresh Urs
- Music by: Jassie Gift
- Production companies: AKM Film Production; Day Night Pictures
- Release date: 1 July 2014
- Running time: 143 minutes
- Country: India
- Language: Tamil

Eera Veyyil (transl. Humid heat) is a 2014 Indian Tamil-language romantic drama film directed by newcomer A. K. Micheal. The film stars Aryan Rajesh and Saranya Nag with Aadukalam Naren, Nizhalgal Ravi, and Pithamagan Mahadevan in supporting roles.

== Plot ==
Bala is the son of an honest tehsildar. At a temple pond, he sees a girl and splashes water on her. Bala is then taken to the police station since the girl is Priya, the daughter of the Kumbakonam mayor, Krishnamoorthy. Upon hearing this, Priya feels bad for Bala. They both start to have phone conversations and fall in love. When Priya's father learns that Priya is talking with a ruffian, he starts to hunt down Bala with the help of police officer Venugopal. How Bala tries to escape from the police forms the rest of the story.

== Cast ==
- Aryan Rajesh as Bala
- Saranya Nag as Priya
- Aadukalam Naren as Venugopal
- Nizhalgal Ravi as Bala's father
- Pithamagan Mahadevan as Krishnamoorthy
- Ajay Rathnam as Police commissioner
- Meera Krishnan as Priya's mother
- Black Pandi as Kutty
- Dhamu as Velu
- Ramya as Revathi
- Sriranjani as Teacher
- Sampath Ram as Police officer
- Comagan as Flower seller
- Scissor Manohar as Newspaper reader
- Crane Manohar as Pharmacist

== Production ==
The film was re-launched in 2013 as Eera Veyyil with A. K. Micheal as the director and changes to the supporting cast. The name was changed because the director knew that the name Thiruvasam would have controversy due to the religious meaning of the name. A. K. Micheal ventured into direction with this film. He previously worked as a stills photographer for seven films and as an art director for sixteen films. Businessmen Durai Prabhakaran, Ramesh Ethiraja, Pavesh V. Jain, T. Nedumaran and R. Senthil Kumar produced the film. Aryan Rajesh, who was last seen in Pokkisham (2009), returns to Tamil cinema with this film. He shot for this film alongside Thuttu and Vedikkai; however, both of those films were never released. Nizhagal Ravi was cast as Rajesh's father. Aadukalam Naren and Pithamagan Mahadevan were cast in important roles.

== Soundtrack ==
Eera Veyyil

Film score by Jassie Gift
- Released: 1 July 2014
- Genre: Feature Film Soundtrack
- Length: 20:40
- Label: Studio Plus Entertainment

The songs were composed by Jassie Gift in his fourth Tamil film. Vairamuthu wrote the lyrics for all the songs.

No.	Title	Lyrics	Singer(s)	Length
1.	"Kalai Ithu Koyil"	Vairamuthu	Jassie Gift	3:44
2.	"Uyire Uyire"	Vairamuthu	Prasanna	3:07
3.	"Nee Oru Kavithai"	Vairamuthu	Hariharan	3:58
4.	"Kadellam"	Vairamuthu	Frango, Madhanki	3:46
5.	"Vaa Vaa"	Vairamuthu	Haricharan	3:59
6.	"Chennai Enbathu"		Shankar Mahadevan	3:26
Total length:				20:04
