= 10th Class =

2006 Telugu romance film

- DVD cover
- Directed by: Chandu
- Written by: Chandu
- Produced by: Venkata Shyam Prasad
- Starring: Bharath; Saranya; Sunaina
- Cinematography: T. Surendra Reddy
- Edited by: Goutham Raju
- Music by: Mickey J Meyer
- Production company: SP Entertainments
- Release date: April 7, 2006
- Running time: 180 minutes
- Country: India
- Language: Telugu

10th Class is a 2006 Indian Telugu-language romance film directed by Chandu and produced by Venkata Shyam Prasad under SP Entertainments. The film stars Bharath, Kadhal Saranya and Sunaina.

== Cast ==
- Bharath as Srinu
- Saranya as Anjali
- Sunaina as Sandhya
- Jayalalita
- Ali
- Krishna Bhagavaan
- Ravali
- Ashok Kumar K.
- Gundu Sudarshan

== Soundtrack ==
The music was composed by Mickey J. Meyer and Released by Aditya Music.

10th Class

Soundtrack album by Mickey J. Meyer
- Released: February 21, 2006
- Recorded: 2006
- Genre: Soundtrack
- Length: 31:37
- Label: Aditya Music
- Producer: Mickey J. Meyer

Mickey J. Meyer chronology
10th Class (2006)	Happy Days (2007)

All tracks are written by Kulasekhar.

Track-List
No.	Title	Singer(s)	Length
1.	"Kannulu Rendu"	Karthik, Chithra	4:25
2.	"Oohala Pallakiva"	Karthik, Shravani	4:53
3.	"Namaha Namaha"	Hariharan, Shravani	4:12
4.	"Mounamela Manasa"	Krishna Chaitanya, Shravani, Chorus	2:14
5.	"O Prema"	Harini	4:20
6.	"Emainado"	Shravani	1:10
7.	"Toli Choopule"	Shravani	1:20
8.	"Jabiliki"	Deepu	4:52
9.	"Maa Oopiri"	Tippu, Tarun Meyer	4:11
Total length:			31:37

== Reception ==
A critic from Telugucinema.com opined that "All in all, it is very average teenage love story with some good music".
