= Kalam Marindi =

- Poster
- Directed by: K. Viswanath
- Written by: Bollimunta Sivaramakrishna (Dialogues)
- Screenplay by: K. Viswanath
- Story by: Mamata Unit (story)
- Produced by: Vasiraju Prakasam & B.Hanumantha Rao
- Starring: Gummadi; Anjali Devi; Sobhan Babu; Sarada; Rao Gopala Rao; Chandra Mohan; Suryakantam; Sakshi Ranga Rao; Pushpa Kumari; Chalapathi Rao
- Cinematography: Ashok Kumar
- Edited by: P Venkateswara Rao, K. Satyam
- Music by: Saluri Rajeshwara Rao
- Production company: Venus Studio
- Release date: 1972
- Country: India
- Language: Telugu

Kalam Marindi (transl. The Times Have Changed) is a 1972 Indian Telugu-language film directed by K. Viswanath and produced by Bommisetty, Hanumantha Rao & Vasiraju Prakasam. The story is based on the concept of untouchability and casteism and is dedicated to Mahatma Gandhi.

== Plot ==
Lakshmipati (Gummadi) is a respectable man in the village who lives with his wife Annapurna (Anjali Devi). He has a younger sister Thayaru (Pushpa Kumari) who is married to Seshavatharam (Sakshi Ranga Rao). Lakshmipati's farm servant Koteshu (Rao Gopal Rao) is a widower with a baby named Shanthi. Koteshu loses his life in a fight and Lakshmipati chooses to adopt Shanthi. The entire village scorns him for adopting an untouchable. Even Thayaru and her husband dislike his decision and disown him. Lakshmipati and Annapurna decide to shift to the city where they can lead a peaceful life, and no one knows their identity.

Years pass and Shanthi (Sharada) grows up with Lakshmipati and Annapurna's biological daughter Geetha (Geethanjali). Lakshmipati and Annapurna hide Shanthi's birth secret. Srinivas (Sobhan Babu) is a college student who lives with his grandmother Doddamma (Suryakantham). Doddamma approaches Lakshmipati with a marriage proposal for Srinivas and Geetha, but they both dislike each other; Geetha thinks Srinivas is too innocent and dependent on his grandmother, while he thinks she is arrogant and childish. Moreover, Srinivas begins to fall for Shanthi.

Thayaru falls ill and Lakshmipati arrives in the village, however he is stopped from visiting her because of the family values. Thayaru succumbs to her illness and passes away. Srinivas tells his grandmother that he wishes to marry Shanthi and asks her to speak to Lakshmipati. Just at that time, Lakshmipati and Annapurna visit their house and Doddamma asks about the proposal. She rages and Srinivas is shocked when Lakshmipati reveals that Shanthi is an untouchable, and the couple leave. Shanthi is also shocked to hear her birth secret and breaks down. When she decides to quit the house, Srinivas stops her and decides to take her to his home, which Lakshmipati approves. As Doddamma has not seen Shanthi before, he takes her to his home and introduces Shanthi as a poor girl Lakshmi and has her work as a maid in the house and assist Doddamma. Doddamma is pleased with Shanthi and endears her not knowing her true identity. In this manner, Srinivas teaches Shanthi the principle of all humans are the same and untouchability is not a true religious concept. Meanwhile, Seshavataram's son Krishnavataram and Geetha fall in love. Seshavataram moves ahead with a marriage proposal for the two and Annapurna agrees.

A thief breaks into Doddamma's house during the night and tries to steal an idol, but Shanthi saves the idol and gets assaulted. When the thief tries to escape, Doddamma catches him, and he brutally assaults her too. Both Shanthi and Doddamma are admitted in the hospital. Shanthi is safe but Doddamma needs someone to donate blood, so Shanthi steps forward and volunteers to donate her blood. Doddamma is now safe, but Shanthi is in critical condition, however she recovers soon. Doddamma repents for her behavior and realizes the true meaning of humanity and begs forgiveness. The film ends with the marriages of Srinivas & Shanthi and Krishnavataram & Geetha.

== Cast ==
- Gummadi as Lakshmipati
- Anjali Devi as Annapurna
- Sobhan Babu as Srinivas
- Sarada as Shanti
- Rao Gopala Rao as Koteshu
- Chandra Mohan as Krishnavataram
- Potti Prasad as Krishnavataram's friend
- Suryakantam as Doddamma (Srinivas' grandmother)
- Sakshi Ranga Rao as Seshavatharam
- Pushpa Kumari as Thayaru
- Geetanjali as Geetha
- Raavi Kondala Rao
- Allu Ramalingaiah as MLA Ekambareshwar Rao
- Nirmalamma as Shanti's aunt
- Devadas Kanakala
- Chalapathi Rao as Doctor
- K.V. Chalam
- P. J. Sarma as Doctor

== Songs ==
- "Emitayya Sarasalu" (Lyrics: Kosaraju Raghavaiah)
- "Mundarunna Chinnadani" (Lyrics: Daasarathi Krishnamacharyulu)
- "Sannajaji Sogasundi" (Lyrics: C. Narayana Reddy)
- "Nijam Telugusukondi O YuvakullarA" (Lyrics: Dasarathi Krishnamacharyulu)
- "Om Namo Narayanaya" (Lyrics: Devulapalli Krishnasastri)
- "Palle Nidurinchenu" (Lyrics: Dasaradhi Krishnamacharyulu)
- "Ee Thalli Padenu Jola" (Lyrics: Devulapalli Krishnasastri)
- "Maraledhule Eekalam" (Lyrics: Dasarathi Krishnamacharyulu)

== Awards ==
- Vasiraju Prakasam won the Nandi Award for Best Feature Film - Gold in 1972.
