= Komminenivaripalem =

- Village
- Nickname: K.V.palem
- Interactive map of Komminenivaripalem
- Location in Andhra Pradesh, India Komminenivaripalem (India)
- Coordinates: 15.949°N 79.990°E
- Country: India
- State: Andhra Pradesh
- District: Prakasam
- Mandal: Ballikurava

Government
  - Type: Democracy

Area
  - Total: 5 km^{2} (1.9 sq mi)
  - Rank: 100
  - Rank: 100
  - Density: 10/km^{2} (26/sq mi)

Telugu
  - Official: Telugu
- Time zone: UTC+5:30 (IST)
- Vehicle registration: AP

Komminenivaripalem is a village in Ballikurava mandal, Prakasam district of the Indian state of Andhra Pradesh.
