= SP Entertainments =

Indian film production company

- Company type: Private
- Industry: Entertainment
- Key people: Venkata Shyam Prasad; Venu Thottempudi
- Products: Films

SP Entertainments is an Indian film production company founded by Venkata Shyam Prasad in 1998.

== Films Produced ==
The company produced several films, such as Swayamvaram, Chirunavvutho, and Kalyana Ramudu.

== Company Formation ==
SP Entertainments formed as a S.P. Entertainments Pvt ltd in the year 2005 with Venkata Shyam Prasad and Venu Thottempudi.

== Filmography ==
Year	Film	Notes
1999	Swayamvaram	Won the 3 Nandi Awards
2000	Chiru Navvutho	Won the 4 Nandi Awards
2003	Kalyana Ramudu	
2004	Cheppave Chirugali	
2005	Sadaa Mee Sevalo	
2006	10th Class	
2006	Maa Iddari Madhya	
2013	Ramachari	

== Awards ==
Ceremony	Year	Category	Nominee	Result
Nandi Awards	2000	Nandi Award for Best Feature Film (Gold)	Chirunavvutho	Won
