= Nuvve.. Nuvve... =

2002 Indian film directed by Trivikram Srinivas

- Directed by: Trivikram Srinivas
- Written by: Trivikram Srinivas
- Produced by: Sravanthi Ravi Kishore
- Starring: Tarun; Shriya Saran; Prakash Raj
- Cinematography: Hari Anumolu
- Edited by: A. Sreekar Prasad
- Music by: Koti
- Production company: Sri Sravanthi Movies
- Release date: 10 October 2002
- Country: India
- Language: Telugu

Nuvve.. Nuvve... (transl. You.. You...) is a 2002 Indian Telugu-language romance film written and directed by Trivikram Srinivas in his directorial debut. The film starred Tarun, Shriya Saran, and Prakash Raj in the lead roles. Upon release, the film and the soundtrack received rave reviews, and has garnered two state Nandi Awards, and a Filmfare Award South. The film was subsequently dubbed into Marathi as Shahane Saasarebuva by B4U Marathi and in Malayalam as Pranayamay.

== Plot ==
Anjali (Shriya Saran) is the daughter of millionaire Viswanath (Prakash Raj) ,who loves her very much, so much so that when she asks him for an ice cream, he buys her an ice cream parlor. Viswanath expects a son-in-law who will never oppose him in any matter. Rishi (Tarun), a good-hearted but happy-go-lucky guy, hails from a middle-class family. His father owns a departmental store. Anjali happens to join the college in which Rishi is a senior. Soon, they fall in love with each other.

On one occasion, Rishi takes Anjali to Mumbai for dinner. Anjali tries to shake off the issue with her father, saying that she was with one of her friends. Unfortunately, Viswanath called that friend while Anjali was missing. He then figures out Anjali went to Mumbai with someone called Rishi. This is enough for Viswanath's suspicion to rise that Anjali has fallen in love. He asks Rishi to prove his worth and asks him in some way to earn any money so that he can support Anjali, whom he has brought up in riches. When Rishi refuses to comply, he gives Rishi one crore rupees to forget his daughter. Rishi takes it and then later gives it back, insulting Viswanath, and tries to prove that his love is greater than everything and money cannot buy his love.

To retaliate, Viswanath insults Rishi's family by getting a beggar for marriage with Rishi's sister to try to convey to them the pain he must feel. Rishi then creates a scene in Viswanath's office beating up a security guard and destroying computers in the office, Rishi clarifies in the proposal that the beggar be married to Rishi's sister as there is no love between the two, but Rishi and Anjali love each other. Anjali starts to show more feelings for Rishi. Worried, Viswanath tries to set Anjali's marriage with another man. Anjali meets Rishi at his home and requests him to marry her right at the moment, but Rishi convinces Anjali that this is not the right way. Rishi takes her back to her home, there Rishi challenges Viswanath that if getting Anjali married to someone else is right, then that marriage cannot be stopped, but if it is wrong, then that marriage cannot happen. Consequent incidents make Viswanath realize his mistakes, and the arranged marriage fails, while Viswanath marries Anjali to Rishi.

== Cast ==
- Tarun as Rishi
- Shriya Saran as Anjali
- Prakash Raj as Viswanath
- Chandra Mohan as Rishi's father
- Rajiv Kanakala as Anjali's brother
- Sunil as Pandu
- Anitha Chowdary as Anjali's sister-in-law
- M. S. Narayana as Police Constable
- Sudha as Rishi's mother
- Pragathi as Anjali's mother
- Madhumitha as Anjali's friend
- Tanikella Bharani as Abu, Viswanath's friend
- Dharmavarapu Subramanyam as Gentleman Sir
- Shilpa Chakraborty as Priya Rishi's collegemate
- Gundu Sudarshan as Shopkeeper
- Junior Relangi as Grocery Shop Customer

== Soundtrack ==
Nuvve Nuvve

Soundtrack album by Koti
- Released: 2002

The music was composed by Koti. All lyrics were written by Sirivennela Seetharama Sastry.

No.	Song	Singer(s)
1	"Computerlu"	Devan, Koti, Trivikram, Anuradha Sriram
2	"Naa Manasukemayyindi"	Udit Narayan, Nitya Santoshini
3	"Nuvve Nuvve Kavalantundi"	Chithra
4	"I Am Very Sorry"	KK
5	"Niddurapothunna"	Shankar Mahadevan
6	"Ammai Nachesindi"	Rajesh, Kousalya

== Reception ==
A critic from Idlebrain.com wrote, "First half of the film is fun and has youth-orientation. But it's the second half that holds the life for Nuvve Nuvve". A critic from The Hindu wrote, "Perhaps, by their very nature, most love stories are similar with identical situations especially woven around teenagers. The 'Nuvvu' sentiment is still working wonders or at least the filmmakers think so. And Nuvve Nuvve is no exception to the rule". A critic from Full Hyderabad said, "The film is definitely worth watching, thanks to its tight script, decent music, decent performances, novel treatment and brilliantly written dialogues". Deccan Herald wrote, "Those who enjoyed the first half of the movie will find the second half a bit boring. But still, the movie is watchable".

== Awards ==
Filmfare Awards South

- Best Supporting Actor - Prakash Raj

Nandi Awards

- Second Best Feature Film - Silver - Sravanthi Ravi Kishore
- Best Dialogue Writer - Trivikram Srinivas
