= Chirunavvutho =

2000 Indian Telugu-language film

- Directed by: G. Ram Prasad
- Written by: Screenplay: G. Ram Prasad; Story & Dialogues: Trivikram Srinivas
- Produced by: Venkata Syam Prasad
- Starring: Venu; Shaheen Khan; Prema; Prakash Raj
- Cinematography: K. Prasad
- Music by: Mani Sharma
- Production company: SP Entertainments
- Release date: 10 November 2000
- Country: India
- Language: Telugu

Chirunavvutho (transl. With a Smile) is a 2000 Indian Telugu-language film directed by G. Ram Prasad, with a story written by Trivikram Srinivas. The film stars Venu, debutante Shaheen Khan, Prema, and Prakash Raj. The music for the film was composed by Mani Sharma. Upon release, Chirunavvutho became a commercial success.

The film won three Nandi Awards, including Best Feature Film. It was later remade into Kannada as Premakke Sai (2001) and Tamil as Youth (2002), with Shaheen reprising her role in both remakes. The film was also unofficially remade in Hindi as Muskurake Dekh Zara (2010).

== Plot ==
The story revolves around Venu, who is an orphan and a talented chef. His philosophy is to live happily with a positive attitude all the time. His maternal uncle wants to marry him with his daughter Aruna. Aruna runs away from the house during the marriage by discriminating against him as a low life chef, and he cannot be suitable for her.

Venu goes to the city to find a job in restaurants. There, he meets Sandhya. During a New Year's party, her soft drinks glass was adulterated with alcohol and she was about to be raped. Then Venu saves her from the rogues who had tried to rape her. Later, Sandhya becomes close to Venu, and both of them are fond of each other. During her birthday party, she introduces Pratap to Venu and announces that she will soon marry him, and then Venu becomes upset. When asked about his disappointment, Venu proposes to Sandhya, for which she politely declines his proposal. Venu takes the rejection in a positive way, but being straightforward, Venu believes that Sandhya still loves him. Then, he pursues his quest for the love of Sandhya. Meanwhile, Sandhya observes the characters of selfish and self-centered Pratap and optimistic and selfless Venu.

Venu receives a call from a police station where Aruna was saved by the police when she attempted suicide. Then Aruna reveals to Venu that her lover cheated her after elopement, having no hope she was thinking what to do before the tank bund, but the police misunderstood her and arrested her for attempting suicide. Venu makes her confident and returns her to his home and heals her emotional wounds, and then Venu's friends suggest marrying now reformed Aruna, but Venu rejects it by saying that he has sympathy on Aruna not love and that he would take care of her as a good friend. Aruna also supports his decision. Sandhya observes Venu through these circumstances and starts to admire Venu and befriends Aruna.

Later, it is revealed that Pratap is Aruna's lover who cheated her for the sake of Sandhya's property. Then he secretly meets Aruna and supports his decision to cheat her by saying that he would find a better life than her by marrying Sandhya, just like how she had discriminated against her cousin Venu, and he proposes to Aruna to "keep her" out of wedlock. Then furious Aruna slaps Pratap and warns him not to reenter her life. Then Venu, who listened to all of this standing in the back door, appreciates Aruna for her courage and warns Pratap for his misbehaviour. Then opportunistic Pratap makes mends with both that they do not ruin his marriage with Sandhya. Then Venu confidently accepts it and predicts that Sandhya will leave Pratap soon and bang him out from his house.

Meanwhile, Sandhya, caught in confusion between both of them, asks her mother about her definition of love. Her mother advises: "It's better to marry a person who loves you than marrying a person whom you love."

Those words changed the mind and heart of Sandhya, and she decided to accept Venu's proposal. Then Sandhya turns a runaway bride and goes to Venu's house to ask his hand for marriage. But Venu, who has his own attitude and wisdom, makes Sandhya confident and return her to the wedding.

Then Venu talks with Pratap in private and blackmails him that he would receive nothing if his past relationship with Aruna is revealed. Then he offers a cheque of 1 crore rupees to Pratap for dropping out of wedding (which was previously given to him by Sandhya's father to forget his daughter). Pratap graciously accepts the amount. Then Venu and Sandhya marry with the support of Pratap, while Sandhya's father, with no option left, becomes a silent spectator at the wedding.

Later, Pratap lies to Sandhya's father that Venu emotionally blackmailed him so he would kill himself if he couldn't marry Sandhya and that's why to support his true love, he had sacrificed Sandhya to him. Then Sandhya's father, impressed with his attitude and tells him that if he had another daughter then he would've betrothed her to him and the film ends when Sandhya's father says to Pratap that he canceled the cheque which he had given to Venu in front of jaw-dropped Pratap.

== Cast ==
- Venu as Venu
- Shaheen Khan as Sandhya
- Prema as Aruna
- Prakash Raj as Pratap
- Giri Babu as Sandhya's father
- Chandra Mohan as Venu's uncle
- Priya as Priya
- Sunil as Sunil, Venu's roommate
- L. B. Sriram as Venu's roommate
- Brahmanandam
- M. S. Narayana
- Gundu Sudarshan
- Nutan Prasad
- Ananth Babu
- Sudha
- Annapurna
- Sangeetha
- Rajitha
- Vajja Venkata Giridhar as Venu's friend

== Production ==
The film was initially titled as Chirunavvu (transl. smile). A few scenes were inspired by the 1997 Italian film Life Is Beautiful. Three songs were shot in Canada.

== Soundtrack ==
Chirunavvutho

Soundtrack album by Mani Sharma
- Recorded: Mani Sharma
- Label: Aditya Music

The music of the film was composed by Mani Sharma.

S. No.	Song title	Singers	Lyricist
1	"Andam Nee Pera"	Udit Narayan, Prasanna	Bhuvana Chandra
2	"Hoyyare Hoyyare"	Shankar Mahadevan	Bhuvana Chandra
3	"Kanulu Kalisaaye"	K. S. Chithra, Hariharan	Bhuvana Chandra
4	"Ninnala Monnala"	S. P. B. Charan	Sirivennela Sitaramasastri
5	"Santhosam Sagam"	S. P. Balasubrahmanyam	Sirivennela Sitaramasastri
6	"Sonare Sonare"	K. S. Chithra, Shankar Mahadevan	Bhuvana Chandra
7	"Chirunavvutho"	S. P. Balasubrahmanyam	Sirivennela Sitaramasastri

== Reception ==
Jeevi of Idlebrain.com rated the film four out of five stars and wrote, "Treatment and the dialogues are the highlights of this film". A critic for Andhra Today wrote, "Trivikram's story and dialogue deserve full honours. Unlike run-of-the-mill love stories, the writer has given a good story which will be acclaimed even by critics. Dialogues provide a smooth-sail entertainment and one gets the feeling that the movie got over too soon". A critic for Full Hyderabad wrote, "The theme is good and it is handled well" but added that "Venu, with his wooden expression, disappoints. Watch this film if you have nothing else to do".

== Awards ==
Nandi Awards 2000

- Best Feature Film - Gold - P. V. Syam Prasad
- Best First Film of a Director - G. Ramprasad
- Best Screenplay - G. Ramprasad

Filmfare Awards

- Best Music Director - Mani Sharma
