= Nandi Award for Best Dialogue Writer =

Indian film award

This is a list of the recipients of the Nandi Award for Best Dialogue Writer since 1983:

== List ==
Year	Writer	Film
1983	Dasari Narayana Rao	M.L.A. Yedukondalu
1984	Ganesh Patro	Swathi
1985	M. V. S. Haranatha Rao	Pratighatana
1986	Kondaveeti Venkatakavi	Tandra Paparayudu
1987	M. V. S. Haranatha Rao	Idaa Prapancham
1988	Ganesh Patro	Rudraveena
1989	M. V. S. Haranatha Rao	Bharata naari
1990	Gollapudi Maruthi Rao	Master Kapuram
1991	Mullapudi Venkata Ramana	Pelli Pusthakam
1992	Jandhyala	Aapadbandhavudu
1993	P. L. Narayana	Dandora
1994	M. V. S. Haranatha Rao	Anna
1995	Ajay Shanti	Sogasu Chuda Taramaa?
1996	Paruchuri Brothers	Naayudigaari Kutumbam
1997	K. N. Y. Pathanjali	Sindhooram
1998	Paruchuri Brothers	Ganesh
1999	L. B. Sriram	Ramasakkanodu
2000	Trivikram Srinivas	Azad
2001	Trivikram Srinivas	Nuvvu Naaku Nachav
2002	Trivikram Srinivas	Nuvve Nuvve
2003	Puri Jagannadh	Amma Nanna O Tamila Ammayi
2004	Trivikram Srinivas	Malliswari
2005	Trivikram Srinivas	Athadu
2006	Abburi Ravi	Bommarillu
2007	Ramesh - Gopi	Adavari Matalaku Ardhale Verule
2008	Puri Jagannadh	Neninthe
2009	L. B. Sriram	Sontha Ooru
2010	P. Sunil Kumar Reddy	Ganga Putrulu
2011	Neelakanta	Virodhi
2012	Tanikella Bharani	Mithunam
2013	Trivikram Srinivas	Attarintiki Daredi
2014	M. Rathnam	Legend
2015	Sai Madhav Burra	Malli Malli Idi Rani Roju
2016	Srinivas Avasarala	Jyo Achyutananda

=== Most won ===
Winners with most wins
Writer	Wins
Trivikram Srinivas	6
M. V. S. Haranatha Rao	4
Paruchuri Brothers	2
Ganesh Patro	2
L. B. Sriram	2
Puri Jagannadh	2
