= Kalyana Ramudu =

2003 film by G. Ram Prasad

- Directed by: G. Ram Prasad
- Screenplay by: G. Ram Prasad
- Story by: Jenny
- Based on: Kalyanaraman (Malayalam)(2002) by Shafi
- Produced by: Venkata Shyam Prasad
- Starring: Venu Thottempudi; Prabhu Deva; Nikita
- Edited by: Gowtam Raju
- Music by: Mani Sharma
- Production company: SP Entertainments
- Release date: 18 July 2003
- Country: India
- Language: Telugu

Kalyana Ramudu (Telugu: కళ్యాణ రాముడు) is a 2003 Indian Telugu-language family film and remake of 2002 Malayalam film Kalyanaraman directed by G. Ram Prasad and produced by Venkata Shyam Prasad under SP Entertainments. The film stars Venu Thottempudi, Prabhu Deva and Nikita in the lead roles.

== Cast ==
- Venu Thottempudi as Kalyana Ramudu "Ramu"
- Prabhu Deva as Rajesh
- Nikita as Kalyani
- Suman as Shiva
- Nassar as Kalyani's father
- Sunil as Chari
- M. S. Narayana as Pahilwan
- Chittajalu Lakshmipati
- Raja Ravindra as Madan
- Raghu Babu as Subbu
- Gundu Prasad
- Uma Shankari as Kalyani's sister
- J. V. Somayajulu
- Allu Ramalingaiah as Kalyana Ramudu's grandfather
- Vajja Venkata Giridhar as Student
- Devi Charan
- Sana as Kalyani's mother

== Music ==
Kalyana Ramudu

Soundtrack album by Mani Sharma
- Released: 2003
- Producer: Mani Sharma

The music of the film was composed by Mani Sharma. Except "Preminchukuna", all the tunes from Malayalam original were retained in this version.

Sno	Song title	Singers
1	"Dolu Baja"	Shankar Mahadevan
2	"Parigethi"	Mano
3	"Gutthonkaya"	Shankar Mahadevan, Sujatha Mohan
4	"Kathalo Raja"	K. J. Yesudas
5	"Preminchukuna"	Udit Narayan, Kalpana
6	"Sitakokamma"	Shankar Mahadevan, S.P.B.Charan

== Reception ==
A critic from Sify wrote that "The film is entertaining in first half, which peters out to be melodramatic and slow. But on the whole the film is a hilarious laugh riot".
