= Trivikram Srinivas =

Indian filmmaker (born 1971)

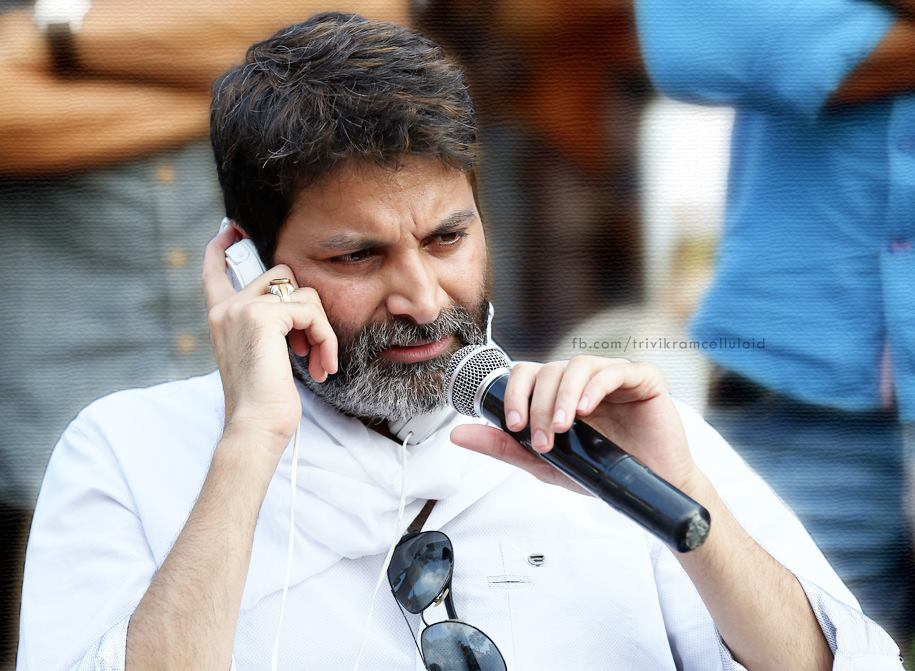
- Trivikram in 2016
- Born: Akella Naga Srinivasa Sarma; 7 November 1971 (age 54); Bhimavaram, Andhra Pradesh, India
- Other names: Maatala Maantrikudu, Guruji, 3V
- Education: Andhra University
- Occupations: Film director; screenwriter
- Years active: 1999–present
- Known for: Action comedy; Romantic comedy; Family drama
- Spouse: Sai Soujanya (m. 2002)
- Children: 2
- Parent(s): Akella Uday Bhaskar Rao; Akella Narsamma
- Awards: Nandi Awards; Filmfare Awards South

Akella Naga Srinivasa Sarma (born 7 November 1971), known professionally as Trivikram Srinivas, is an Indian film director and screenwriter known for his work in Telugu cinema. Recognised for his witty dialogues, humour, and philosophical themes, he is one of the highest-paid directors in Indian cinema. He has received six Nandi Awards for Best Dialogue Writer and two Filmfare Awards for Best Director. In 2015, he received the BN Reddy National Award for his contributions to Indian cinema.

A university gold medalist with a master's degree in nuclear physics, Trivikram began his career as a screenwriter before transitioning to directing. He is popularly referred to as "Maatala Maantrikudu" (transl. 'Wizard of Words'), and "Guruji" (transl. 'The Master') by Telugu audiences. His films are characterised by fast-paced repartee, humorous content, action elements, mythological references, and themes exploring relationships. Some of his works incorporate ideas from Hindu philosophy into mainstream cinema.

In 2000, Trivikram wrote the dialogues for Nuvve Kavali, which won the National Film Award for Best Feature Film in Telugu. His other writing credits include Swayamvaram (1999), Chirunavvutho (2000), Nuvvu Naaku Nachav (2001), Manmadhudu (2002), and Malliswari (2004). He made his directorial debut with Nuvve Nuvve (2002), which won the Nandi Award for Best Feature Film (Silver). His notable directorial works include Athadu (2005), Jalsa (2008), Khaleja (2010), Julayi (2012), Attarintiki Daredi (2013), S/O Satyamurthy (2015), A Aa (2016), Aravinda Sametha Veera Raghava (2018), and Ala Vaikuntapuramulo (2020).

== Early life ==
Trivikram Srinivas was born as Akella Naga Srinivasa Sharma in Bhimavaram, Andhra Pradesh. During his childhood, he used to watch a lot of films, and thought of becoming a film director at age 14. He, however, had no plans for a career in films, as he thought it was impractical, considering his financial situation, which was such that even buying a ticket to travel from Bhimavaram to Hyderabad, the hub of the Telugu film industry, was itself a big task.

Trivikram finished his schooling at S.Ch.B.R.M. High School, and completed Intermediate, and graduated with a Bachelor of Science (B.Sc) degree from D.N.R. College in Bhimavaram. He then moved to the city of Visakhapatnam to study for his master's degree at Andhra University. In the city he spent every day of his stay watching movies; all the while, he made sure his parents never knew of his intention to become a film director. He was also an avid reader and was so addicted to it that he used to get "a high while reading books". He completed his two-year M.Sc degree course in nuclear physics in 15 months and graduated with a gold medal from Andhra University.

Trivikram then started to work as a high school teacher in Bhimavaram, teaching math, physics, and chemistry. His friend, actor Sunil, who was then struggling for chances in film industry, wanted someone to support him as a source of strength and requested Trivikram to join him in Hyderabad, to which he obliged. He then started taking classes for students there, living on the income from tuition fees, and spent his spare time trying to find opportunities for himself to enter the film industry.

== Career ==
=== Early beginnings ===
Srinivas met writer Kommanapalli Ganapathi Rao, and on his suggestion, published his short story "Road" in Andhra Jyothi, a leading Telugu newspaper. For the first time he uses his pen name "Trivikram" for the credit later it becomes popular through that name. It was his first and only story published so far. Rao liked his writing and assured him of work in the film Merupu (1996) but expressed that the producer would not be able to pay for his work. Trivikram then started working for the film, and after 10 days of work, when the shooting of the film shifted to a faraway location in Gandipet, he disassociated himself from the project, citing lack of money to travel. Actor Gautam Raju, a close friend of Sunil, then helped Trivikram in getting an opportunity in the industry. He introduced Trivikram to T. D. V. Prasad, who was then working on the film titled Akka! Bagunnava? (1996). Prasad narrated the story but said the entire script was complete except for the climax and asked Trivikram to come up with his own version of the climax. He then wrote and narrated it. Posani Krishna Murali, one of the established writers, who happened to be present there, was impressed with Trivikram's writing. However, they later lost contact with each other.

Trivikram worked as writer for a film-based program conducted by Gautam Raju in ETV. Raju connected him once again to Posani, who was then in Chennai. Trivikram then took his remuneration of Rs. 3000/- from ETV and used it to travel to Chennai to meet Posani, who was then writing for the film Pavitra Bandham (1996). After meeting up with Posani, Trivikram was asked if he knew how to write scripts and dialogues, to which he said yes like an experienced professional, the fact being he did not know anything about it at all. Posani then went into another room to attend a phone call, and it was during this time that Trivikram looked into a film script and understood the format of writing scenes anddialogues on paper. He was then given a narration of the story of Pavitra Bandham by Posani and was asked to come up with his own version of scenes. Impressed by the resultant work, he was employed as a writer, and thus began his writing career. Under the tutelage of Posani, during a stint of 20 months, Trivikram learned a lot and gained a vast experience in writing for films of all genres. Posani never treated Trivikram as a ghostwriter and always introduced him as his assistant writer or associate writer to others, such as directors E. V. V. Satyanarayana, Muthyala Subbaiah, and B. Gopal.

=== 1999: Screenwriting debut ===
==== Swayamvaram (1999) ====
Trivikram, who initially had no plans in writing for films, but instead had an interest in directing films, did not want to settle in his newfound role as an assistant or associate writer of others. He met actor Venu and producer Venkata Shyam Prasad and narrated the story of Swayamvaram to them. They believed in the gist of his story, which Trivikram condensed into one single dialogue: "Prema ane swargam nundi, 7 adugula dooramlo vunde narakame pelli". (transl. From the Heaven called Love, 7 steps away lies the Hell called Marriage). After listening to this dialogue, the film's director, K. Vijaya Bhaskar, insisted that he should write the dialogues for the film. Producer Shyam, overcoming many obstacles and risks, produced and released the film on 22 April 1999, which then became a huge commercial success. The film marked the official debut of Trivikram as a screenwriter.

==== Nuvve Kavali (2000) ====
Despite the success of Swayamvaram, Trivikram had no interesting offers. He went back to Bhimavaram and lived there for over one-and-a-half months. He then received a call from Sravanthi Ravi Kishore to accompany him to Chennai for buying the remake rights of the Malayalam film, Niram (1999), which would be remade as Nuvve Kavali. Taking only the essence of the film without its transcript, Trivikram rewrote the entire dialogues afresh, using only one dialogue from the original: "Nuvvendukuraa Naaku mundu I Love You cheppaledu?". (transl. Why haven't you told "I Love You" to me first?), as he felt it captured the essence of the film. He added humour with the dialogues and incorporated new characters, including one for Sunil. While Nuvve Kavali was getting done, he simultaneously penned the story and dialogues for his next venture, Chirunavvutho (2000). Nuvve Kavali released in late 2000 and went on to be a huge blockbuster, as well as the highest grosser of its time.

=== Other projects ===
After the success of Swayamvaram and Nuvve Kavali (2000), Trivikram went on to write the story and dialogues for Chirunavvutho (2000), Nuvvu Naaku Nachav (2001), Manmadhudu (2002), Malliswari (2004), and Jai Chiranjeeva (2005). He also wrote dialogues for the Telugu film Vasu (2002).

Trivikram even penned the lyrics for a song in the film Oka Raju Oka Rani (2003), and sang a portion of the song "Computers-u Arts-u Science-u" in his directorial debut Nuvve Nuvve (2002). Even before he became a director, his writings set high standards in Telugu films, which his contemporaries found tough to match.

=== 2002–2010: Directorial debut and breakthrough ===
During the filming of Nuvve Kavali, Trivikram narrated the script of Nuvve Nuvve to producer Sravanthi Ravi Kishore, who liked it and asked him if he could direct it. Trivikram accepted the offer and asked for some time as he needed more confidence. He commenced the direction of Nuvve Nuvve after the release of another of his works as writer, Nuvvu Naaku Nachav, in late 2001. Nuvve Nuvve released in 2002, marking Trivikram's directorial debut. Although the film received critical acclaim and became successful at the box office, Trivikram was not completely happy with it and felt that the writer in him dominated the director in that film.

Nuvve Nuvve was followed by the critically-acclaimed film Athadu (2005). It collected a distributor share of ₹19 crore in its total run, thus becoming a box office hit. Its satellite rights were sold for ₹4.5 crore. Following upon its initial recognition, the film was dubbed into Tamil, Malayalam, and Hindi, as well as being dubbed into Polish for a release in Poland as a Poszukiwany, becoming the first Telugu film released in Poland.

Trivikram's third directorial, Jalsa, became the most anticipated film of the year 2008, with a release of 325 prints in 1000 theatres. The film's audio rights were sold to Aditya Music for ₹90 lakh, the highest for a Telugu film ever at the time. Jalsa became a major hit at box office and was the highest-grossing Telugu film of 2008. Jalsa was followed by Khaleja (2010), Trivikram's second collaboration with Mahesh Babu after Athadu. Trivikram directed Babu in two Thums Up soft drink commercials to assist in promoting the film. Khaleja opened to mixed reviews and underperformed at the box office, but underwent critical revaluation in the upcoming years and has a cult following.

=== 2011–2016: Commercial success ===
Trivikram provided the dialogues and screenplay for the film, Teen Maar (2011), starring Pawan Kalyan and Trisha in a remake of Love Aaj Kal. He then directed Julayi (2012) starring Allu Arjun and Ileana D'Cruz, and the film became a box-office hit. Next, he directed Attarintiki Daredi (2013), starring Pawan Kalyan, Samantha, and Pranitha Subhash. Despite the film's pirated version, which has up to 90 minutes of the film being put up online a few days before its official release, the film became an industry hit. Attarinitki Daredi received positive reviews from critics according to International Business Times India, who called the film a "perfect family entertainer" in their review roundup.

Trivikram then directed S/O Satyamurthy (2015), starring Allu Arjun and Samantha. The film was released on 9 April 2015 to a general positive response. On a ₹40 crore ($6.23 million) budget, S/O Satyamurthy earned a distributor share of ₹51.9 crore ($8.1 million) and grossed ₹90.5 crore ($14.1 million). His romance film A Aa (2016) starring Nithiin and Samantha became above average.

=== 2018–present: Career fluctuations ===
2018 was a mixed bag for Trivikram, as his Agnyaathavaasi starring Pawan Kalyan, Keerthy Suresh, and Anu Emmanuel was a disaster at the box-office, while his Aravinda Sametha Veera Raghava starring NTR Jr. and Pooja Hegde became a hit, collecting ₹95.2 crore distributor share worldwide. His 2020 film Ala Vaikunthapurramuloo (2020), starring Allu Arjun and Pooja Hegde, became the fourteenth-highest grossing Telugu film of all time at the time of its release, collecting more than ₹152 crore distributor share worldwide with a gross over ₹250 crore.

His next projects were Bheemla Nayak (2022) and Bro (2023), remakes for which he wrote the screenplay and dialogues, starring Pawan Kalyan alongside Rana Daggubati and Sai Dharam Tej respectively. His next directorial feature was the Mahesh Babu-starrer Guntur Kaaram (2024), marking their third collaboration. It received negative reviews from critics and was a box office failure.

== Personal life ==
In Hyderabad, as a group of aspirants for a career in films, Trivikram, Sunil, R. P. Patnaik, Chandra Siddhartha, Gopimohan, Dasaradh, and Venu all used to meet in a café called "Try Luck" and discuss about opportunities in films. Interestingly, they all started getting noticed in film industry only after the café went out of business. Patnaik came to Hyderabad to prepare for civil services and became Trivikram and Sunil's roommate for many days. Gunasekhar also stayed with them as their roommate during his struggling days. As of 2016, Trivikram maintains the room in the Punjagutta neighborhood as a memory by paying rent.

Actor Sunil and Trivikram were friends since their early days in Bhimavaram. Both graduated from the D.N.R. College in Bhimavaram, Trivikram with B.Sc and Sunil with B.Com Fine Arts; both even married on the same day.

In 2002, Trivikram married Sai Soujanya, niece of Telugu lyricist, Sirivennela Seetharama Sastry. The couple has two children.

== Filmmaking style ==
Trivikram's writing is interlaced with original and subtle humor. His films are known for their creative and quick-witted dialogue. Idlebrain.com praised his 2002 directorial debut, Nuvve Nuvve, for "decimating the dullness and the dreariness" plaguing the characterization of actors in then Telugu fims. In early 2005, The Hindu compared Trivikram favourably with filmmaker Shankar.

Trivikram packs his films with surprise action sequences and often projects two versions of the same event (appearing at two different junctures in the film), showcasing two different perspectives towards the same incident. The female protagonists in his films ensure the majority of the laughs, whereas the male protagonists are guarded about their families and provide security. Self-respect and relationships-over-money issues also form major parts of his plots.

== Filmography ==
=== As director ===
Key
†	Denotes films that have not yet been released

Year	Title	Notes	Ref.
2002	Nuvve Nuvve	Also playback singer for "Computerlu"	
2005	Athadu		
2008	Jalsa		
2010	Khaleja		
2012	Julayi		
2013	Attarintiki Daredi		
2015	S/O Satyamurthy		
2016	A Aa		
2018	Agnyaathavaasi		
2018	Aravinda Sametha Veera Raghava		
2020	Ala Vaikunthapurramuloo		
2024	Guntur Kaaram	Also lyricist for 2 songs	
2026	Aadarsha Kutumbam		

Other roles

Year	Title	Story	Screenplay	Dialogue	Notes	Ref.
1999	Swayamvaram	Yes	No	Yes		
2000	Ninne Premistha	No	No	Yes		
2000	Nuvve Kavali	No	No	Yes		
2000	Chirunavvutho	Yes	No	Yes		
2001	Nuvvu Naaku Nachav	Yes	No	Yes		
2002	Vasu	No	No	Yes		
2002	Manmadhudu	Yes	No	Yes		
2003	Oka Raju Oka Rani	No	No	No	As lyricist	
2004	Malliswari	Yes	No	Yes		
2005	Jai Chiranjeeva	Yes	No	Yes		
2011	Teen Maar	No	Yes	Yes		
2018	Chal Mohan Ranga	Yes	No	No	Also co-producer	
2022	Bheemla Nayak	No	Yes	Yes	Also lyricist for "Lala Bheemla"	
2023	Bro	No	Yes	Yes		

== Awards ==
Nandi Awards

Year	Work	Category	Result
2000	Chirunavvutho	Best Dialogue Writer	Won
2001	Nuvvu Naaku Nachav	Best Dialogue Writer	Won
2002	Nuvve Nuvve	Best Dialogue Writer	Won
2004	Malliswari	Best Dialogue Writer	Won
2005	Athadu	Best Dialogue Writer	Won
2013	Atharintiki Daaredi	Best Dialogue Writer	Won

Filmfare Awards South

Year	Work	Category	Result
2005	Athadu	Best Director	Won
2013	Atharintiki Daaredi	Best Director	Won

South Indian International Movie Awards

Year	Work	Category	Result
2013	Attarintiki Daredi	Best Director	Won
2020	Ala Vaikunthapurramuloo	Best Director	Won

Santosham Film Awards

Year	Work	Category	Result
2008	Jalsa	Best Director	Won

- Allu Ramalingaiah Memorial Award
