= Sankarabharanam (1980 film) =

Shankarabharanam
- Film poster
- Directed by: K. Viswanath
- Written by: Story & Screenplay: K. Viswanath; Dialogues: Jandhyala
- Produced by: Edida Nageswara Rao; Aakasam Sriramulu
- Starring: J.V. Somayajulu; Manju Bhargavi; Chandra Mohan
- Cinematography: Balu Mahendra
- Edited by: G. G. Krishna Rao
- Music by: K. V. Mahadevan
- Distributed by: Poornodaya Movie Creations
- Release date: 2 February 1980
- Running time: 143 minutes
- Country: India
- Language: Telugu
- Budget: ₹13.50 Lakhs

Shankarabharanam (transl. The Ornament of Shankara) is a 1980 Indian Telugu-language musical drama film co-written and directed by K. Viswanath. Produced by Edida Nageswara Rao under Poornodaya Movie Creations, the film stars J. V. Somayajulu, Manju Bhargavi, Chandra Mohan, and Rajyalakshmi. The soundtrack was composed by K. V. Mahadevan. The film explores the cultural divide between Indian classical and Western pop music through the perspectives of characters from different generations.

Released on 2 February 1980, Shankarabharanam opened to near-empty halls, but quickly gained widespread popularity, eventually running for over 25 weeks in many centres. In Tamil Nadu, the film was a major sensation, showing in packed houses in its original version. It was later dubbed into Tamil and Malayalam, with the Malayalam version also enjoying a year-long theatrical run.

The film received significant acclaim, winning the Prize of the Public at the Besançon Film Festival, France in 1981. It was screened at several international festivals, including the 8th International Film Festival of India, the Tashkent Film Festival, the Asia Pacific Film Festival, and the Moscow International Film Festival in May 1980. Shankarabharanam was also featured in an online poll by CNN-IBN in 2013, where it ranked eleventh for the "greatest Indian film ever" as part of the centenary celebration of Indian cinema. The film was honoured with four National Film Awards, including Best Popular Feature Film, making it the first South Indian film to receive this award. It also received seven state Nandi Awards. Following its success, Viswanath directed a Hindi remake titled Sur Sangam (1985). Forbes India included J. V. Somayajulu's performance in Shankarabharanam in its list of "25 Greatest Acting Performances of Indian Cinema."

== Plot ==
Sankara Sastri is a highly revered Carnatic musician renowned for his mastery of the raga Sankarabharanam. He is deeply dedicated to his art and lives with his daughter, Sarada. Tulasi, the daughter of a courtesan, is a trained classical dancer who harbors a deep spiritual admiration for Sastri's music. One morning, Tulasi observes Sastri teaching Sarada on a riverbank and begins dancing to his song. Upon noticing her, Sastri encourages her to continue, establishing an mutual artistic respect between them.

Tulasi's mother had pressured her to join the family's traditional profession of prostitution. When her mother attempts to sell her to a wealthy landlord, Tulasi escapes on a train and encounters Sastri, who provides her temporary shelter at his mansion. Tulasi's mother creates a public scene, falsely accusing Sastri of exploiting her daughter, and forces Tulasi back home. Soon after, the landlord assaults Tulasi and mocks her devotion to Sastri. Outraged, Tulasi stabs the landlord to death. She flees back to Sastri, who secures the legal assistance of his advocate friend, Madhava, to save her from imprisonment. While the court convicts Tulasi's mother for her role in the exploitation, Tulasi is left destitute, prompting Sastri to permanently shelter her and support her artistic career.

The orthodox village community strongly disapproves of a Brahmin maestro housing a courtesan's daughter. Sastri's household staff abandons him, and when he insists that Tulasi perform alongside him as an accompanist at a temple concert, his regular musicians walk out in protest. Overburdened with guilt for causing Sastri's social boycott, Tulasi quietly leaves the village. She subsequently realizes she is pregnant as a result of the assault.

Years pass, and the cultural landscape shifts toward modern pop music. Sastri's popularity declines significantly because of his refusal to compromise his classical musical integrity for commercial gain, leaving him and an adult Sarada living in near-poverty. Meanwhile, Tulasi raises her son, Shankaram. Intending for the boy to become Sastri’s disciple, Tulasi returns to the area and instructs Shankaram to pose as an orphan to gain admission into Sastri's house. Sastri accepts the boy and begins training him, while Tulasi secretly watches from afar.

Tulasi later encounters Madhava, who informs her that her mother passed away in guilt and left substantial assets in her name. Tulasi secretly uses this wealth to financially support Sastri and arrange Sarada's marriage to Kameswara Rao, an esteemed local school teacher. Sastri initially rejects the marriage proposal due to a misunderstanding regarding Rao's background, but after witnessing Rao's genuine devotion to music at a temple, he gives his consent.

Following the wedding, Tulasi anonymously finances a grand felicitation concert for Sastri to restore his public legacy. Sastri takes the stage but suffers a sudden stroke mid-performance, rendering him unable to complete the composition. To save the recital, Tulasi sends Shankaram onto the stage to finish the song. Hearing the boy's flawless rendition, Sastri realizes Shankaram is Tulasi's son and his true musical heir. He waves off medical assistance and places his Gandapenderam onto Shankaram's leg, officially passing on his lineage. Tulasi rushes to the stage and collapses at her guru's feet; both Sastri and Tulasi pass away simultaneously. The film concludes with Shankaram performing at a temple, successfully carrying Sastri's musical legacy forward.

== Cast ==
- J. V. Somayajulu as 'Shankarabharanam' Shankara Sastry
- Manju Bhargavi as Tulasi
- Chandra Mohan as Kameswara Rao
- Rajyalakshmi as Sarada
- Tulasi as Shankaram
- Allu Ramalingaiah as Madhava
- Nirmalamma as Bamma
- Sakshi Ranga Rao as Gopalam
- Dubbing Janaki as cook
- Jith Mohan Mitra as Dasu
- Baby Varalakshmi as Young Sarada
- Jhansi as Ratna Papa
- Pushpa Kumari
- Arja Janardhana Rao as Tulasi's maternal uncle
- Edida Sriramprasad
- S. Bheemeswara Rao as Zamindar
- Dhum
- Srigopal
- Ganeswara Rao

== Production ==
=== Development ===
After hearing the plot, the producers were initially taken aback due to the parallel cinema tone to the subject matter, but finally Edida Nageswara Rao agreed to produce the film. He wanted Akkineni Nageswara Rao to enact the role of Shankara Sastry, K. Viswanath wanted Sivaji Ganesan to perform the role, but couldn't approach him for various reasons and also wanted Krishnam Raju for the role, but later refused as Viswanath felt his image as a star would ruin the role and he chose a debutant J. V. Somayajulu, a stage artist for the role. K. Viswanath scripted and directed the film, while Jandhyala gave the dialogues. Balu Mahendra performed the cinematography while the film is edited by G. G. Krishna Rao. Thota Tharani worked as the film's production designer. Vamsy, who went on to direct films like Sitaara, Anveshana and Ladies Tailor was one of the assistant directors in the film.

=== Filming ===
The shooting of the film was completed in 60 days. The film was mostly shot in Rajahmundry, Raghudevapuram, Polavaram, Ramachandrapuram, Annavaram, and Somavaram in Andhra Pradesh, Thiruvanmiyur in Madras, Belur and Halebeedu in Karnataka.

== Soundtrack ==
The music, largely Carnatic based, was composed by K.V. Mahadevan. M. Balamuralikrishna was the original choice for the male playback singer, due to the heavy classical content of the compositions. Since M. Balamuralikrishna was not so much inclined to sing in the movie, K. V. Mahadevan, having faith in the mettle of S. P. Balasubrahmanyam, insisted on him taking up this challenge. The soundtrack has lyrics by Veturi and vocals by S. P. Balasubrahmanyam, S. Janaki and Vani Jairam.

All music is composed by K. V. Mahadevan.

Songs
No.	Title	Lyrics	Playback	Length
1.	"Brochevarevarura"	Mysore Vasudevachar	S. P. Balasubrahmanyam, Vani Jayaram
2.	"Dorakunaa Ituvanti Seva"	Veturi	S. P. Balasubrahmanyam, Vani Jayaram
3.	"Manasa Sancharare"	Sadasiva Brahmendra	S. P. Balasubrahmanyam, Vani Jayaram
4.	"Maanikya Veena" (Poem)	Mahakavi Kalidasu	S. P. Balasubrahmanyam
5.	"Omkaara Naadaanusandhanamou"	Veturi	S. P. Balasubrahmanyam, S. Janaki
6.	"Paluke Bangaaramaayena"	Bhadrachala Ramadasu	Vani Jayaram
7.	"Raagam Taanam Pallavi"	Veturi	S. P. Balasubrahmanyam
8.	"Shankaraa Naadasareeraparaa"	Veturi	S. P. Balasubrahmanyam
9.	"Saamajavaragamana"	Thyagaraja, Veturi	S. Janaki, S. P. Balasubrahmanyam
10.	"Ey Teeruga Nanu"	Bhadrachala Ramadasu	Vani Jayaram

== Release and reception ==
Released on 2 February 1980, the film was released in only a very few theatres and opened to almost empty halls. However, in a week through positive reviews and word of mouth theatres were packed. The film had 216-day run at Royal theatre, Hyderabad. The film was dubbed into Malayalam and released in New Theatre, Thiruvananthapuram and Kavitha Theatre, Ernakulam on 12 September 1980, where it ran successfully for over 200 days. It is considered a cult classic in Telugu cinema especially due to the use of carnatic music that is more true to the classical form than for film.

The Tamil dubbed version of the film was rereleased on 13 March 2015. M. Suganth of The Times of India wrote that "This film is a textbook example of how music and storytelling can go hand-in-hand to create a brilliant film".

== Accolades ==
=== International recognition ===
- The film won the Prize of the Public at the "Besançon Film Festival of France" in the year 1981.
- On the centenary of Indian cinema in 2013, Forbes included J. V. Somayajulu's performance in the film on its list of "25 Greatest Acting Performances of Indian Cinema".
- In 2013, in an online poll conducted by CNN-IBN on their website as part of the hundred years celebration of Indian cinema, Shankarabharanam came eleventh in the poll for finding the "greatest Indian film ever."

=== National recognition ===
The film won four National Film Awards, primarily in the Music categories. This makes Shankarabharanam the only Telugu film to win four National Film Awards at the time. The film is one of the three Telugu films to win the National Film Award for Best Popular Film Providing Wholesome Entertainment. The film also won seven Nandi Awards, including the Nandi Award for Best Feature Film. Four of the seven Nandi Awards are from the Music categories.

Award	Category	Nominee(s)	Result
National Film Awards	National Film Award for Best Popular Film Providing Wholesome Entertainment	Edida Nageswara Rao	Won
National Film Awards	National Film Award for Best Music Direction	K. V. Mahadevan	Won
National Film Awards	National Film Award for Best Male Playback Singer	S. P. Balasubrahmanyam	Won
National Film Awards	National Film Award for Best Female Playback Singer	Vani Jayaram	Won
Filmfare Awards South	Filmfare Award for Best Actor – Telugu	J. V. Somayajulu	Won
Nandi Awards	Nandi Award for Best Feature Film	Edida Nageswara Rao	Won
Nandi Awards	Nandi Award for Second Best Story Writer	K. Viswanath	Won
Nandi Awards	Nandi Award for Best Male Playback Singer	S. P. Balasubrahmanyam	Won
Nandi Awards	Nandi Award for Best Female Playback Singer	Vani Jayaram	Won
Nandi Awards	Nandi Award for Best Music Director	K. V. Mahadevan	Won
Nandi Awards	Nandi Award for Best Lyricist	Veturi	Won
Nandi Awards	Nandi Award for Best Child Actress	Tulasi	Won

== Legacy ==
The success of this film triggered a sequence of classical films in Telugu, including Tyagayya (by Bapu), Meghasandesam (by Dasari N. Rao), and Viswanath's own follow-ups: Saptapadi, Saagara Sangamam, Swathi Muthyam, Sruthi Layalu, Swarna Kamalam, Swayam Krushi, Sirivennela, Swarabhishekam, Swati Kiranam. S.P. Balasubrahmanyam, the Telugu playback singer who rendered all the songs of Sastri's character, has often said this movie was the highlight of his career. It got S. P. Balasubrahmanyam his first National Award for singing, and made him a household name across all of South India. Film critic Gudipoodi Srihari called it the best Telugu film he has seen after Mayabazar.

== Bibliography ==
- Banerjee, Shampa; Srivastava, Anil (1988). One Hundred Indian Feature Films: An Annotated Filmography. Taylor & Francis. ISBN 0-8240-9483-2.
