= Nandi Awards of 1988 =

Indian Telugu film and TV awards ceremony

Nandi Awards presented annually by Government of Andhra Pradesh. First awarded in 1964.

== 1988 Nandi Awards Winners List ==
Category	Winner	Film
Best Feature Film	K. Viswanath	Swarnakamalam
Second Best Feature Film	Visu	Adade Aadharam
Third Best Feature Film	M. V. Raghu	Kallu
