= Nandi Award for Best Feature Film =

Indian award

This is the list of winners of the Nandi Award, for Best Feature Films in Telugu cinema, since 1964.

== Best Feature Film - Gold ==
Year	Movie	Director	Producer	Music	Actors
2016	Pelli Choopulu	Tharun Bhascker Dhaassyam	Raj Kandukuri; Yash Rangineni	Vivek Sagar	Vijay Deverakonda, Ritu Varma
2015	Baahubali: The Beginning	S. S. Rajamouli	Shobu Yarlagadda	M. M. Keeravani	Prabhas, Rana Daggubati, Anushka Shetty, Ramya Krishnan, Satyaraj, Tamannaah
2014	Legend	Boyapati Srinu	Korrapati Ranganatha Sai	Devi Sri Prasad	Nandamuri Balakrishna, Radhika Apte
2013	Mirchi	Koratala Siva	V. Vamsi Krishna Reddy	Devi Sri Prasad	Prabhas, Anushka Shetty
2012	Eega	S. S. Rajamouli	Korrapati Ranganatha Sai	M. M. Keeravani	Sudeepa, Nani, Samantha Ruth Prabhu
2011	Sri Rama Rajyam	Bapu	Yalamanchali Sai Babu	Ilaiyaraaja	Nandamuri Balakrishna, Nayantara, Srikanth, Sai Kumar, Akkineni Nageswara Rao
2010	Vedam	Radhakrishna Jagarlamudi	Devineni Prasad; Yarlagadda Sobhu	M. M. Keeravani	Allu Arjun, Anushka Shetty, Manoj Manchu
2009	Sontha Vooru	P. Sunil Kumar Reddy	Y Ravindra Babu; Kishore Basireddy	Saketh Sairam	L. B. Sriram
2008	Gamyam	Radhakrishna Jagarlamudi	Saibabu Jagarlamudi	R. Anil, E. S. Murthy	Allari Naresh, Sharwanand, Kamalinee Mukherjee
2007	Mee Sreyobhilashi	Eswar Reddy	Y. Sonia Reddy	Koti	Rajendra Prasad, Radha Kumari
2006	Bommarillu	Bhaskar	Dil Raju	Devi Sri Prasad	Siddharth, Genelia D'Souza, Jayasudha, Prakash Raj
2005	Pothe Poni	Tammareddy Bharadwaja	V. Y. Praveen Kumar	Mickey J. Meyer	Sindhu Tolani, Siva Balaji
2004	Aa Naluguru	Chandra Siddhartha	Sarita Patra	RP Patnaik	Rajendra Prasad, Aamani
2003	Missamma	Neelakanta	B. Satyanarayana	Vandemataram Srinivas	Sivaji, Bhoomika Chawla, Laya
2002	Manmadhudu	K. Vijaya Bhaskar	Nagarjuna	Devi Sri Prasad	Nagarjuna Akkineni, Sonali Bendre
2001	Preminchu	Boyina Subba Rao	D. Ramanaidu	M. M. Srilekha	Laya, Sai Kiran
2000	Chirunavvutho	G. Ramprasad	P. V. Syam Prasad	Mani Sharma	Venu Thottempudi, Shaheen
1999	Kalisundam Raa	Uday Shankar	Daggubati Suresh Babu	S. A. Rajkumar	Venkatesh, Simran
1998	Tholi Prema	A. Karunakaran	G. V. G. Raju	Deva	Pawan Kalyan, Kirti Reddy
1997	Annamayya	K. Raghavendra Rao	Doraswamy Raju	M. M. Keeravani	Nagarjuna, Ramya Krishna, Kasturi
1996	Pavithra Bandham	Muthyala Subbaiah	G. Sivaraju; C. Venkata Raju	M. M. Keeravani	Venkatesh, Soundarya, S. P. Balasubrahmanyam
1995	Sogasu Chooda Tharamaa	Gunasekhar	Ram Gopal	Ramani Prasad	Naresh, Indraja
1994	Bangaru Kutumbam	Dasari Narayana Rao	Kaikala Nageswara Rao	Raj–Koti	ANR, Jayasudha
1993	Mr. Pellam	Bapu	Gavara Partha Sarathi	M. M. Keeravani	Rajendraprasad, Aamani, A.V.S
1992	No Award	-	-	-	-
1991	Yagnam	Gutta Ramineedu	Gutta Ramineedu	-	P. L. Narayana
1990	Erra Mandaram	Muthyala Subbaiah	P. Venkateswara rao	K. Chakravarthy	Rajendraprasad, Yamuna
1989	Geethanjali	Mani Ratnam	C. Praveen Kumar Reddy	Ilayaraja	Nagarjuna Akkineni, Girija
1988	Swarna Kamalam	K. Viswanath	Ch. V. Appa Rao	Ilayaraja	Venkatesh, Bhanupriya
1987	Sruthi Layalu	K. Viswanath	Karunakar; Sudhakar	K. V. Mahadevan	Rajasekhar, Sumalatha
1986	Swathi Muthyam	K. Viswanath	Edida Nageswara Rao	Ilayaraja	Kamal Haasan, Radhika
1985	Mayuri	Singeetham Srinivasa Rao	Ramoji Rao	S. P. Balasubrahmanyam	Sudha Chandran, Nirmalamma, P. L. Narayana
1984	Swathi	Kranthi Kumar	Kranthi Kumar	K. Chakravarthy	Suhasini, Bhanuchander, Sharada
1983	Ananda Bhairavi	Jandhyala	Ashwini Karthika Chitra	Ramesh Naidu	Girish Karnad, Malavika Sarkar, Rajesh
1982	Meghasandesam	Dasari Narayana Rao	Dasari Narayana Rao	Ramesh Naidu	ANR, Jayapradha, Jayasudha
1981	Seethakoka Chiluka	Bharathiraja	Edida Nageswara Rao	Ilayaraja	Karthik, Mucherla Aruna
1980	Yuvatharam Kadilindi	Dhavala Satyam	Madala Ranga Rao	-	Murali Mohan, Radhika, Narra Venkateswara Rao,
1979	Sankarabharanam	K. Viswanath	Edida Nageswara Rao	K. V. Mahadevan	J. V. Somayajulu, Manju Bhargavi
1978	Naalaga Endaro	Eeranki Sharma	K. Prema Ranjith	M. S. Viswanathan	Hema Sundar, G. V. Narayana Rao, Roopa, Lakshmi Kanth
1977	No Award	-	-	-	
1976	Oorummadi Brathukulu	B. S. Narayana	J. Venkatarya; G. K. Murthy	M. B. Sreenivasan	Rallapalli, Madhavi
1975	Jeevana Jyothi	K. Viswanath	D. V. S. Raju	K. V. Mahadevan	Sobhan Babu, Vanisree, Raja Babu
1974	Alluri Seetharama Raju	V. Ramachandra Rao	G. Hanumantha Rao	P. Adinarayana Rao	Krishna, Jaggayya, Vijaya Nirmala & Gummadi
1973	Sharada	K. Viswanath	Kranthi Kumar	K. V. Mahadevan	Sharada, Sobhan Babu & Jayanthi
1972	Kalam Marindi	K. Viswanath	Vasiraju Prakasam	S. Rajeswara Rao	Sobhan Babu, Sharada
1971	Chelleli Kapuram	K. Viswanath	Mannava Venkatarao	K. V. Mahadevan	Sobhan Babu, Vanisree, Nagabhushanam
1970	Kathanayika Molla	B. Padmanabham	B. Purushottam	S. P. Kodandapani	Vanisree, Harinath, B. Padmanabham
1969	Kathanayakudu	K. Hemambaradara Rao	K.Gopala Krishna	T. V. Raju	NTR, Jayalalithaa
1968	Bandhavyalu	S. V. Ranga Rao	Badeti Satyanarayana; Putta Venkatarao	S. Hanumantha Rao	S. V. Ranga Rao, Savitri, Dhulipala
1967	Sudi Gundalu	Adurthi Subba Rao, K. Viswanath	D. Madhusudhana Rao	K. V. Mahadevan	ANR, Pushpavalli, Sukanya, Master Raja
1966	Rangula Ratnam	B. N. Reddy	B. N. Reddy	B. Gopalam, Saluri Rajeshwara Rao	Chandra Mohan, Ram Mohan, Anjali Devi, Vanisree
1965	Antastulu	V. Madhusudhana Rao	V. B. Rajendra Prasad	K. V. Mahadevan	ANR, Bhanumathi, Krishna Kumari, Jaggayya
1964	Doctor Chakravarthy	Adurthi Subbarao	D. Madhusudhana Rao	S. Rajeswara Rao	ANR, Sowcar Janaki, Savitri, Jaggayya, Gummadi & Suryakantham

== Second Best Feature Film - Silver ==
Year	Movie	Director	Producer	Music	Actors
2016	Arddhanaari	P. Bhanushanker Chowdary	M. Ravi Kumar	Ravi Varma	Arjun Yajath, Mouryaani
2015	Yevade Subramanyam	Nag Ashwin	Priyanka Dutt, Swapna Dutt	Radhan, Ilaiyaraaja	Nani, Malavika Nair, Vijay Deverakonda
2014	Manam	Vikram K Kumar	Nagarjuna Akinneni	Anup Rubens	Akkineni Nageswara Rao, Nagarjuna, Naga Chaitanya, Samantha Ruth Prabhu
2013	Naa Bangaaru Talli	Rajesh Touchriver	Sunitha Krishnan	Sharreth	Siddique Anjali Patil, Rathna Shekar Reddy
2012	Minugurulu	Ayodhya Kumar	Ayodhya Kumar	Josyabhatla	Ashish Vidyarthi, Suhasini Maniratnam, Raghubir Yadav
2011	Rajanna	Vijayendra Prasad	Nagarjuna Akinneni	M. M. Keeravani	Nagarjuna, Sneha, Shweta Menon
2010	Ganga Putrulu	P. Sunilkumar Reddy	Kishore	Praveen Immadi	Subbaraju, Gayathri Rao, Rao Ramesh
2009	Baanam	Chaitanya Dantuluri	Seshu Priyanka Chalasani	Mani Sharma	Nara Rohit, Vedhika, Sayaji Shinde, Rajeev Kanakala
2008	Vinayakudu	Sai Kiran Adivi	Saritha Patra	Sam Prasan	Krishnudu, Sonia Deepti
2007	Happy Days	Sekhar Kammula	Sekhar Kammula	Mickey J Meyer	Varun Sandesh, Tamannaah, Nikhil, Vamsi Krishna, Sonia, Rahul
2006	Godavari	Sekhar Kammula	G. V. G. Raju	K. M. Radha Krishnan	Sumanth, Kamalinee Mukherjee
2005	Anukokunda Oka Roju	Chandra Sekhar Yeleti	Gangaraju Gunnam	M. M. Keeravani	Charmy Kaur, Shashank
2004	Anand	Sekhar Kammula	Sekhar Kammula	KM Radha Krishnan	Raja, Kamalinee Mukherjee
2003	Okkadu	Gunasekhar	M.S. Raju	Mani Sharma	Mahesh Babu, Bhumika Chawla, Prakash Raj
2002	Nuvve Nuvve	Trivikram	Sravanthi Ravi Kishore	Koti	Tarun, Shriya Saran, Prakash Raj
2001	Murari	Krishna Vamsi	Gopi Nandigam	Mani Sharma	Mahesh Babu, Sonali Bendre, Lakshmi, Kaikala Satyanarayana
2000	Azad	Tirupathi Swamy	C. Ashwini Dutt	Mani Sharma	Nagarjuna, Soundarya, Shilpa Shetty
1999	Nee Kosam	Srinu Vytla	Ganta Srinivasa Rao	R P Patnaik; Devi Sri Prasad	Ravi Teja, Maheswari, Sivaji Raja
1998	Kante Kuthurne Kanu	Dasari Narayana Rao	Dasari Padma	Vandemataram Srinivas	Dasari Narayana Rao, Jayasudha, Ramya Krishnan
1997	Sindhooram	Krishna Vamsi	Krishna Vamsi; Mohan Mullapudi	Sri	Ravi Teja, Sanghavi, Brahmaji
1996	Little Soldiers	Gangaraju Gunnam	Gangaraju Gunnam	Sri	Baby Kavya, Master Aditya, Heera, Ramesh Aravind, Kota Srinivasa Rao
1995	Badili	C. V. Reddy	C. V. Reddy	-	Anand, Raasi
1994	Subha Lagnam	S. V. Krishna Reddy	K. Venkateswara rao	S. V. Krishna Reddy	Jagapathi Babu, Aamani, Roja
1993	Money	Siva Nageswara Rao	Ram Gopal Varma	Sri	Jayasudha, J. D. Chakravarthy
1992	Rajeswari Kalyanam	Kranthi Kumar	D. Kishore	M.M. Keeravani	ANR, Vanisree, Meena, Suresh, Jayachitra
1991	Pelli Pustakam	Bapu	Mullapudi Venkata Ramana	K. V. Mahadevan	Rajendra Prasad, Divyavani, AVS
1990	Seetharamaiah Gari Manavaralu	Kranthi Kumar	Doraswamy Raju	M.M. Keeravani	ANR, Meena
1989	Mouna Poratam	Mohana Gandhi	Ramoji Rao	S. Janaki	Vinod Kumar, Yamuna
1988	Adade Adharam	Visu	Purna Chandra Rao	Shankar–Ganesh	Visu, Seetha
1987	Abhinandana	Ashok Kumar	R. V. Ramana Murthy	Ilayaraja	Karthik, Shobana
1986	Repati Pourulu	T. Krishna	P. Venkateswara Rao	K. Chakravarthy	Vijayashanti, Anuradha
1985	O Thandri Theerpu	Raja Chandra	Kishore	K. Chakravarthy	Murali Mohan, Jayasudha
1984	Kanchana Ganga	V. Madhusudhana Rao	Ramoji Rao	K. Chakravarthy	Sarath Babu, Saritha
1983	Neti Bharatam	T. Krishna	P. Venkateswara Rao	K. Chakravarthy	Vijayshanti, Suman
1982	Maro Malupu	Vejella Styanarayana	Sagi Krishnam Raju	G. K. Venkatesh	Sai Chand, Narasimha Raju, Sivakrishna, Gummadi
1981	Tholi Kodi Koosindi	K. Balachander	Kanuri Ranjith Kumar	M. S. Viswanathan	Sarath Babu, Seema
1980	Yuvatharam Kadilindi	Dhavala Satyam	Madala Rangarao	T. Chalapathi Rao	M. Prabhakar Reddy, Madala Ranga Rao
1979	Maa Bhoomi	Goutam Ghosh	G. Ravindranath; B. Narsing Rao	Vinjamuri Seetha Devi	Sai Chand, Kakarala, Hamsa
1978	Chali Cheemalu	Devadas Kanakala	J. Venkatarya	-	Nutan Prasad, Sailaja
1977	Tharam Marindi	Singeetham Srinivasa Rao	G. Radha Krishnamurthy	G. K. Venkatesh	Sreedhar, Shubha
1976	Mahakavi Kshetrayya	C. S. Rao	P. Adinarayana Rao	P. Adinarayana Rao	ANR, Anjali Devi, Manjula, Kanchana
1975	Muthyala Muggu	Bapu	M. V. L. Narasimha Rao	K. V. Mahadevan; Sajjad Hussain	Sreedhar, Sangeetha, Rao Gopala Rao
1974	O Seeta Katha	K. Viswanath	A.R.S Sharma	K. V. Mahadevan	Chandra Mohan, Rojaramani, Shubha
1973	Andala Ramudu	Bapu	N. S. Murthy	K. V. Mahadevan	ANR, Latha, Raja Babu
1972	Tata Manavadu	Dasari Narayana Rao	K. Raghava; Ekambara Rao	S. P. Kodandapani	S. V. Ranga Rao, Anjali Devi, Raja Babu, Gummadi, allu Ramalingaiah
1971	Sri Krishna Satya	K. V. Reddy	Nandamuri Trivikrama Rao	Pendyala Nageswara Rao	NTR, J. Jayalalithaa
1970	Kodalu Diddina Kapuram	Yoganand	Nandamuri Trivikrama Rao	T. V. Raju	NTR, Savitri, Vanisree
1969	Athmeeyulu	V. Madhusudhana Rao	D. Madhusudhana Rao/Sri Saradhi Studios	S. Rajeswara Rao	ANR, Vanisree, Chandra Mohan, Chandrakala, Vijaya Nirmala
1968	Chinnari Papalu	Savitri	Matha Pictures	P. Leela	Jamuna, Jaggayya, Shavukaru Janaki
1967	Chadarangam	S. V. Ranga Rao	Badeti Satyanarayana; Putta Venkata Rao	T. V. Raju	S.V. Ranga Rao, Harinath, Jamuna, Anjali Devi
1966	Chilaka Gorinka	Kotayya Pratyagatma	Kotayya Pratyagatma	S. Rajeswara Rao	S.V. Ranga Rao, Anjali Devi, Krishnamraju, Krishna Kumari
1965	Sri Krishna Pandaveeyam	N.T. Rama Rao	N. Trivikrama Rao	T. V. Raju	NTR, K. R. Vijaya, Satyanarayana, Rajanala, Mukkamala
1964	Keelu Bommalu	C. S. Rao	P. Gangadhara Rao	S. P. Kodandapani	Vasanthi, Jaggayya

== Third Best Feature Film - Bronze ==
Year	Movie	Director	Producer	Music	Actors
2016	Manalo Okadu	R. P. Patnaik	G. C. Jaganmohan	R. P. Patnaik	R. P. Patnaik, Anita Hassanandani Reddy
2015	Nenu Sailaja	Kishore Tirumala	Sravanthi Ravi Kishore	Devi Sri Prasad	Ram Pothineni, Keerthy Suresh
2014	Hitudu	Viplove	K. S. V. Narasimhulu	Koti	Jagapati Babu, Meera Nandan
2013	Uyyala Jampala	Virinchi Varma	Daggubati Suresh Babu	Sunny M. R.	Raj Tarun, Avika Gor
2012	Mithunam	Tanikella Bharani	Anand Muyida Rao	Swaraveenapani	S. P. Balasubrahmanyam, Lakshmi
2011	Virodhi	G. Neelakanta Reddy	Anil Meka	R. P. Patnaik	Meka Srikanth, Kamalinee Mukherjee, Ajay
2010	Prasthanam	Deva Katta	Ravi Vallabhaneni	Mahesh Shankar	Sharvanand, Ruby Parihar, Saikumar
2009	Kalavaramaye Madilo	Sathish Kasetty	Mohan Vadlapatla	Sharath	Kamal Kamaraju, Swati Reddy, Vikram Gokhale
2008	Parugu	Bhaskar	Dil Raju	Mani Sharma	Allu Arjun, Sheela, Prakash Raj, Jayasudha
2007	Lakshyam	Srivas	Nallamalupu Srinivas	Mani Sharma	Gopichand, Anushka
2006	Ganga	Vemuganti Lingayya	Sekhar Yalamanchi	Koti	Venu Gopal, Priyanka
2005	Gowtam SSC	P. A. Arun Prasad	Y. Sonia Reddy	Anoop Rubens	Navdeep, Sindhu Tolani
2004	Grahanam	Mohan Krishna Indraganti	Subba Rao, Anji Reddy, P. Venkateswara Rao	K. Vijay	Tanikella Bharani, Jayalalitha
2003	Amma Nanna O Tamila Ammayi	Puri Jagannadh	Puri Jagannadh	Chakri	Ravi Teja, Asin Thottumkal, Jayasudha, Prakash Raj
2002	Santhosham	Dasaradh	K. L. Narayana	R. P. Patnaik	Nagarjuna, Gracy Singh, Shriya Saran, K. Viswanath
2001	Atu America Itu India	Gummaluri Sastry	Santi Kumar Chilumula	Madhavapeddi Suresh	Vijay Nainan
2000	Manoharam	Gunasekhar	Mullapudi Brahmanandam; Sunkara Madhu Murali	Manisharma	Jagapathi Babu, Laya
1999	Prema Kadha	Ram Gopal Varma	Nagarjuna Akkineni	Sandeep Chowta	Sumanth, Antara Mali
1998	Ganesh	Thirupathi Swamy	D. Suresh Babu	Mani Sharma	Venkatesh, Rambha, Madhoo
1997	Thodu	Akkineni Kutumba Rao	N.F.D.C. Limited	Mangalampalli Balamuralikrishna	Sarath Babu, Geetha, Jhansi
1996	Srikaram	C. Uma Maheswara Rao	G. Partha Sarathi	Ilayaraja	Jagapathi Babu, Heera Rajagopal
1995	Ammai Kapuram	Muthyala Subbaiah	M. Nageswara Rao	Vandemataram Srinivas	Ali, Maheswari
1994	Bhairava Dweepam	Singeetam Srinivasa Rao	B. Venkatarami Reddy	Madhavapeddi Suresh	Balakrishna, Roja
1993	Mathru Devo Bhava	K. Ajay Kumar	K. S. Rama Rao	M.M. Keeravani	Madhavi, Nassar, Tanikella Bharani
1992	Aapathbandhavudu	K. Viswanath	Edida Nageswara Rao	M. M. Keeravani	Chiranjeevi, Meenakshi Seshadri
1991	Aswani	B. C. Mouli	Ramoji Rao	M. M. Keeravani	Ashwini Nachappa, Bhanuchander
1990	Hrudayanjali	A.Raghurami Reddy	P. Ramanath	L. Vaidyanathan	Sanjay Mitra, Girija Shettar
1989	Suthradharulu	K. Viswanath	Karunakar; Sudhakar	K. V. Mahadevan	ANR, Bhanuchander, Ramya Krishna, Sujatha
1988	Kallu	M. V. Raghu	D. Vijay Kumar; A. L. Ananda Rao	SP Balasubramanyam	Sivaji Raja, Rajeshwari
1987	Prajaswamyam	Paruchuri Brothers	Pokuri Baburao	-	Rajasekhar, Sharada
1986	Aruna Kiranam	Muthyala Subbaiah	Y. Anil Babu	Chakravarthy	Rajasekhar, Vijayashanti
1985	Vandematharam	T. Krishna	Y. Anil Babu	Chakravarthy	Rajasekhar, Vijayashanti, Nirmalamma, Suthi Velu
1984	Suvarna Sundari	Beeram Masthan Rao	Atla Brahma Reddy	Ramesh Naidu	Chandra Mohan, Jayasri
1983	Sagara Sangamam	K. Viswanath	Edida Nageswara Rao	Ilayaraja	Kamal Haasan, Jayapradha, Sarath Babu, Sailaja
1982	Keerthi Kantha Kanaka	U. Visweswara Rao	U. D. Murali Krishna	-	Nagendra, Mangala Gowri
1981	Ooriki Ichina Maata	Balaiah M.	Balaiah M.	M. S. Viswanathan	Chiranjeevi, Kanta Rao, Sudhakar, Madhavi
1980	Sangham Marali	S. M. Santhanam	P. Apparao	-	Hari Prasad, Jyothi Chitra
1979	Punadi Rallu	G. Raj Kumar	Faazal Huck	Jakkula Premji	Gokina Rama Rao, Chiranjeevi, Narasimha Raju
1978	Karunamayudu	A. Bhimsingh	Vijayachander	Joseph Fernandez; B. Gopalam	Vijayachander, Rajasulochana
1977	Oka Oori Katha	Mrinal Sen	Allareddy Parandhama Reddy	Vijay Raghav Rao	A. R. Krishna, Narayana Rao, M. V. Vasudeva Rao, Mamatha
1976	Anthuleni Katha	K. Balachander	Ram Aranganal	M.S. Viswanathan	Jayapradha, Rajnikanth, Narayana Rao
1975	Swargam Narakam	Dasari Narayana Rao	M. K. Mavulayya; P. S. Bhaskara Rao	Satyam	Annapoorna, Mohan Babu, Jayalakshmi, Easwara Rao
1974	Teerpu	U. Visweswara Rao	U. Viswesara Rao		NTR, M. Prabhakar Reddy
1973	Samsaram Sagaram	Dasari Narayana Rao	K. Raghava	Ramesh Naidu	SVR, Kaikala Satyanarayana, Srividya
1972	Praja Nayakudu	V. Madhusudhana Rao	Ch. Raghava Rao	Satyam	Krishna, Janaki, Nagabhushanam, Jaggayya
1971	Amaayakuraalu	V. Madhusudhana Rao	D. Madhusudhana Rao	S. Rajeswara Rao	ANR, Kanchana, Sharada
1970	Balaraju Katha	Bapu	Nidamarthi Padmakshi	K. V. Mahadevan	Master Prabhakar, Nagabhushanam
1969	Bangaru Panjaram	B. N. Reddy	B. N. Reddy/Vaahini Productions	S. Rajeswara Rao	Sobhan Babu, Vanisree
1968	Bangaru Gajulu	C. S. Rao	Tammareddy Krishna Murthy	T. Chalapathi Rao	ANR, Bharati, Vijaya Nirmala
1967	Bhakta Prahlada	Ch. Narayana Murthy	A. V. Meiyappan	S. Rajeswara Rao	Roja Ramani, S. V. Ranga Rao, Anjali Devi
1966	Asthiparulu	V. Madhusudhana Rao	V. B. Rajendra Prasad	K. V. Mahadevan	ANR, Jayalalithaa, Jaggayya, Nagayya
1965	Aatma Gowravam	K. Viswanath	D. Madhusudhana Rao	S. Rajeswara Rao	ANR, Kanchana, Rajasree, Gummadi, Relangi
1964	Gudi Gantalu	V. Madhusudhana Rao	Nehatha; Doondi	Ghantasala	NTR, Krishna Kumari

== See also ==
- Cinema of Andhra Pradesh
