= S. K. Misro =

Indian actor

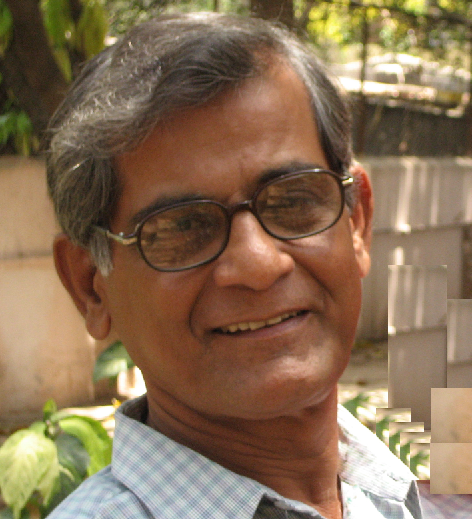
- Born: January 1945 (age 81); India
- Occupations: Actor, Director
- Spouse: Sachala Devi Misro
- Awards: six Nandi Awards for theatre

S. K. Misro (born January 1945), popularly known as Misro, is an Indian actor known for his works exclusively Telugu cinema, theatre and television. He is one of the pioneers of modern Telugu social theatre, and has received six state Nandi Awards. He is best known for his association with director K. Viswanath.

== Theatre ==
- Pavala
- Veta Kukkalu
- Kala Dharmam
- Kedi

== Filmography ==
- Needaleni Aadadi (1973)
- Ainavallu (1975)
- Maainti Devudu (1975)
- Mangalyaniki Maromudi (1976)
- Abhimanyudu (1976)
- Punar Milan (1976) – Oriya
- Priyatama (1977) – Hindi
- Lakshmi (1978)
- Maro Charitra (1978)
- Andamaina Anubhavam (1979)
- Ninaithale Inikkum (1979) – Kamalakar Rao/Mama
- Pratibimbalu (1980)
- Ek Duuje Ke Liye (1981) – Hindi
- Shubh Kaamna (1983) – Hindi
- Saagara Sangamam (1983)
- Sravanthi (1985)
- Andarikante Monagadu (1985)
- Sirivennela (1986)
- Srutilayalu (1987)
- O Prema Katha (1987)
- Swayamkrushi (1987)
- Swarna Kamalam (1988)
- Premayanam (1988)
- Donga Kollu (1988)
- Paila Pachessu (1989)
- Siri Muvvala Simhanadam (1990)
- Prema Entha Madhuram (1991)
- Swathi Kiranam (1992)
- Gangwar (1992)
- Sundarakanda (1992)
- Sahasam (1992)
- Repati Rowdy (1993)
- Prema Pustakam (1993)
- Subha Sankalpam (1995)
- Chinnabbayi (1997)
- Mechanic Mavayya (2000)
- Ninne Ishtapaddanu (2003)
- Toli Choopulone (2003)
- Gopi Gopika Godavari (2009)
- Mrithyunjay (2026)

== Television ==
- DD Detective Subbarao D'Souza
- Malladi Ramakrishna Sastri Kadhalu
- Bharago Kadhalu
- Idi Jivitham
- Wonderboy
- Kalankita
- Lady Detective
- Antarangalu
- Sneha(Aatma Kadhalu)
- Ee Taram Kadha
- Anubandham
- ETV's Sri Bhagavatam (as Sakuni)
- Sankellu
- Mr. Millenium
- Anuhya
- Jillellamudi Amma
- Pelli chesukundam
- Sarva Mangala
- Bhagavata Kadhalu
- Sri Krishna Balarama Yuddham
- Usha Parinayam
- Anuragalu
- Bharatamlo chinna kadhalu
- Bhaama Satyabhaama
- Karna
- Zee Telugu's Tholi Prema
