= Aapadbandhavudu =

- Theatrical poster
- Directed by: K. Viswanath
- Written by: Jandhyala (dialogues)
- Screenplay by: K. Viswanath
- Story by: K. Viswanath
- Produced by: Edida Nageswara Rao
- Starring: Chiranjeevi; Meenakshi Seshadri
- Cinematography: A. Vincent; Ajayan Vincent
- Edited by: G. G. Krishna Rao
- Music by: M. M. Keeravani
- Production company: Poornodaya Movie Creations
- Distributed by: Poornodaya Movie Creations
- Release date: 9 October 1992
- Country: India
- Language: Telugu

Aapadbandhavudu (transl. Protector against danger) is a 1992 Indian Telugu-language drama film written and directed by K. Viswanath. Produced by Edida Nageswara Rao's Poornodaya Movie Creations, the film stars Chiranjeevi and Meenakshi Seshadri while Jandhyala, Sarath Babu, and Geetha play supporting roles. It was the third collaboration between Chiranjeevi and Viswanath following Subhalekha (1982) and Swayam Krushi (1987). The hospital scenes in the second half of the movie are widely considered to be copied from 1975 movie One Flew Over the Cuckoo's Nest.

Aapadbandhavudu was an average grosser at the box office. But, the film won critical acclaim with five state Nandi Awards, including the Nandi Award for Best Actor for Chiranjeevi, and the Filmfare Award for Best Actor – Telugu for Chiranjeevi. The film was screened at the International Film Festival of India, the Asia Pacific Film Festival, and the AISFM Film Festival. The film was later dubbed and released into Tamil as Veera Marudhu.

== Plot ==
Madhava is a loyal friend, servant, and cowherd to Hema and her father. He also performs in the local dramas, in which he portrays Shiva. Hema's father is a teacher and talented poet. However, since his classical poetry is no longer popular, he cannot find a publisher to print his poems. Even though Hema and Madhava love each other, neither realises this due to the societal divisions of caste and economic class present in their village. Hema is the first to realise her love for him, during a drama where she portrays Parvati, but suppresses her feelings owing to social stigma.

One day, in order to pay for the wedding of Hema's elder sister Lalitha, Madhava sells his cows and gives the money to Hema's father through a family friend, as a loan. When Hema's father hears what he has done, he gives Madhava his manuscripts to have them printed. Madhava goes to town to have them printed; however, when he returns, he sees Hema being taken away to an asylum. He learns about the incidents which led to Hema's current mental state: Hema's brother-in-law's attempted rape and Lalitha's death.

Madhava pretends to be mentally unstable and is admitted to the same asylum, where he goes through many hardships in order to save Hema. After stopping a guard from attacking her, he is falsely accused of attempted rape and is given shock therapy. He tries many times to help her regain her memory. When she finally does and realizes what he did for her, she wants to marry him after she is safely rescued. However, Madhava objects to her proposal as he is from the lower strata of society. Hema's fiancé Sripathi convinces him to change his mind. Hema and Madhava finally unite.

== Cast ==
- Chiranjeevi as Madhava
- Meenakshi Seshadri as Hema
- Jandhyala as Teacher (Hema and Lalitha's father)
- Sarath Babu as Sripati
- Arun Kumar As Ramasurya, Lalitha's husband and Hema’s brother in law
- Sameer As Madhava’s uncle
- Geetha as Lalita
- Allu Ramalingaiah as Sripati's father
- Brahmanandam as Madhava's friend
- Nirmalamma as Brahmanandam's grandmother
- Kaikala Satyanarayana as Village President
- Vijayachander as Baba
- Silpa as Mental Asylum Nurse
- Kalpana Rai as Mental Asylum Nurse
- Suthi Velu as Mental Asylum Patient
- Prasad Babu as Mental Asylum Guard
- Mukku Raju as Dancer (cameo appearance)

== Soundtrack ==
Aapadbandhavudu

Soundtrack album by M. M. Keeravani
- Released: 1992
- Language: Telugu
- Label: Lahari Music

M. M. Keeravani chronology
Sundarakanda (1992)	Aapadbandhavudu (1992)	President Gari Pellam (1992)

All songs are composed by M. M. Keeravani and audio is owned by Lahari Music.

No.	Title	Lyrics	Singer(s)	Length
1.	"Odiyappa"	Bhuvanachandra	S. P. Balasubrahmanyam	3:55
2.	"Aura Ammaka Chella"	Sirivennela Seetharama Sastry	S. P. Balasubrahmanyam, K. S. Chithra	5:45
4.	"Chukkallara (Duet)"	Sirivennela Seetharama Sastry	S. P. Balasubrahmanyam, K. S. Chithra	4:53
5.	"Puvvunavve Guvvanavve"	C. Narayana Reddy	S. P. Balasubrahmanyam, K. S. Chithra	5:06
6.	"Athala Vithala"	Sirivennela Seetharama Sastry	S. P. Balasubrahmanyam	2:12
7.	"Parameswaruni"	Sirivennela Seetharama Sastry	K. S. Chithra	2:00
Total length:				26:31

== Awards ==
Nandi Awards

- Third Best Feature Film - Bronze – Edida Nageswara Rao
- Best Actor – Chiranjeevi
- Best Dialogue Writer – Jandhyala
- Best Art Director – B. Chalam & Arun D Ghodgavnkar
- Best Choreographer – Bhushan Lakhandri

Filmfare Awards South

- Filmfare Award for Best Actor – Telugu – Chiranjeevi
- Filmfare Award for Best Director – Telugu – K. Viswanath
- Nomination for Filmfare Award for Best Actress – Telugu - Meenakshi Sheshadri
