= M. V. S. Haranatha Rao =

Indian film writer and actor

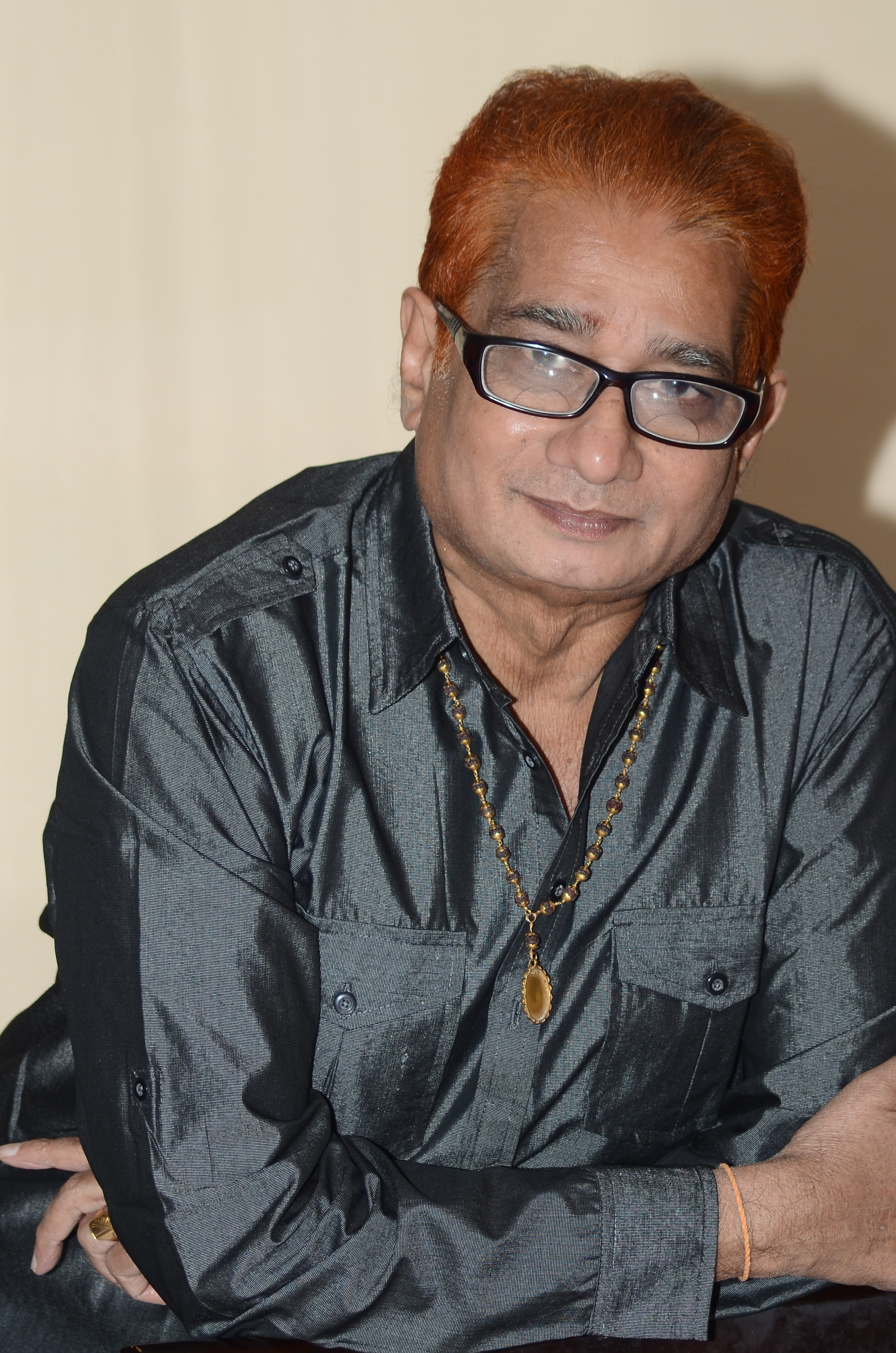
- Born: 27 July 1948; Guntur, Andhra Pradesh, India
- Died: 9 October 2017 (aged 69); Ongole, Andhra Pradesh, India
- Occupations: Playwright, Director, Writer, Actor
- Spouse: Koteswari
- Children: Kumar Sahitya, Sri Suktha, Natya Sasi
- Parents: Rangacharyulu (father); Satyavathi Devi (mother)
- Relatives: Marudhuri Raja (younger brother)

M. V. S. Haranatha Rao (27 July 1948 – 9 October 2017) was a noted Telugu playwright, script writer and actor. He wrote dialogues for more than 150 films. His notable films include Pratighatana, Anna, and Ammayi Kapuram, and he received five Nandi Awards.

M.V. S. Haranatha Rao entered the cine field through noted film maker T. Krishna. He worked as a story and dialogue writer for such award-winning films as Swayamkrushi, and Sutradharulu. He also played significant roles in Rakshasudu and Swayamkrushi. Most of his dialogues are progressive in nature and for the betterment of the society.

== Personal life ==
M.V. S. Haranatha Rao studied in Guntur. He was interested in theater arts since his childhood. He started acting in stage dramas since his third standard. His father Rangacharyulu was a clerk and mother was a carnatic music professional.

He used to go to mythological dramas along with his father. When his mother got transferred to Ongole, Haranatha Rao also went there and joined Sarma College.

He was married to Koteswari who is a Govt school teacher in Ongole. Haranatha Rao used to travel from Ongole to Chennai/Hyderabad to have a good work life balance. Koteswari supported Haranatha Rao in every aspect of life. They have three children (two sons and a daughter).

== Theater ==
The first play he wrote was Rakta Bali (Blood sacrifice). He was a good friend of T. Krishna from his college days. They both used to work together on stage plays. After they witnessed dramas in Vijayawada as part of stage celebrations, he was inspired to do a thorough research and wrote a play called Jagannatha Ratha Chakralu (The wheels of chariot of Lord Jagannatha). This novel is about the philosophical existence of god. He got a critical response from people like Kodavatiganti, Gora, and Acharya Aatreya. He also got invitation to enter into film world, but he did not go.

His play Kanya Vara sulkam has won the best drama award of the Andhra Pradesh Cultural Affairs Department. Kshira Sagara Mathanam (Churning of mythological ocean) got him Sahitya academy award. In addition to writing the plays, he also directed and composed music for some of the plays.

In 1980, when Andhra Nataka Parishat, Rajamandri conducted competitions for stage plays and his four plays won 20 out of 25 awards.

=== List of stage plays ===
- Raktabali
- Jagannatha Ratha Chakralu
- Kshirasagara Mathanam
- Antham Kadidi Arambham
- Yakshaganam
- Redlight Area
- Mee Peremiti?
- Boochi
- Adavilo aksharalu
- Ledi panja
- Tere naam
- Harmonium
- Thalangu Thakadhimi
- Janani Jaiahe
- Khadga Srushti
- Prajakavi Vemana
- Naivedyam

== Filmography ==
He wrote dialogues for more than 150 films. He received four Nandi Awards for the films Pratighatana, Bharata Nari, Anna, Ammayi Kapuram, Idaa Prapancham for his story/dialogues. He also acted in more than 30 films.

=== As a writer ===
- Pratighatana
- Bharata Nari
- Idaa Prapancham
- Desamlo Dongalu Paddaru
- Devalayam
- Repati Pourulu
- Manchi Donga
- Yuddha Bhoomi
- Rakshasudu
- Ramayanam
- Inspector Pratap
- Dharma Chakram
- Adapilla
- Adigo Alladigo
- Akali Neeku Joharlu
- Ammayi Kapuram
- Anna
- Aruna Kiranam
- Athagaru Swagatham
- Bharatasimha Reddy
- Broker
- Chalo Assembly
- Dr. Ambedker
- Evandi Aavida Vachindi
- Jai
- Kallu
- Kodukulu
- Kondapalli Rathaiah
- Kuthuru
- Leader
- M. Dharmaraju M.A.
- Maa Ayina Bangaram
- Manavudu Dhanavudu
- Manchi Donga
- M.L.A. Yedukondalu
- Modilla Muchata
- Nenu Saitam
- Paruvu Pratishta
- Praanam
- Punya Bhoomi Naa Desam
- Sagatu Manishi
- Sardar Krishnama Naidu
- Seetakka
- Sutradharulu
- Srimathi velostha
- Stuartpuram Police Station
- Subhapradam
- Swarnakka
- Swati Kiranam
- Yerra Mandaram
- Yuddha Bhoomi
- Vande Mataram (1985 film)
- Taraka Ramudu
- Navayugam
- Encounter
- Repati Rowdy
- Pichi Pullayya
- Atha Nee Koduku Jagartha
- Oka Yadardha Prema Katha
- Vadani Malli
- Vadina Gari Gajulu
- Vamsam
- Goonda Rajyam
- Mamathala Kovela
- Pathala Bhairavi (Hindi) - Translated by Kader Khan
- Andam

=== As an actor ===
- Kalyana Veena (1983)
- M. Dharmaraju M.A. (1984)
- Akkali Neeku Joharlu (1984)
- Devalayam (1985)
- Moodilla Muchata (1985)
- Rakshasudu (1986) as Narakasurudu
- Artharatri Swatantram (1986)
- Swayamkrushi (1987)
- Sardar Krishnama Naidu (1987) as Kaleshwara Rao
- Bhargava Ramudu (1987)
- Kulala Kurukshetram (1987)
- Sarvabhoumudu (1989) as Professor Jayadev
- Goonda Rajyam (1989)
- Aadapilla (1991)
- Paruvu Pratishta (1993)
- Dharma Chakram (1996)
- Chitram (2000)
- Chalo Assembly (2000)
- 1 2 3 from Amalapuram (2005)
- Sambhavami Yuge Yuge (2006)
- Broker (2010)
- Hora Hori (2015)

== Awards ==
Nandi Awards

- Best Dialogue Writer, 1985 - Pratighatana
- Best Dialogue Writer, 1987 - Idaa Prapancham
- 'Best Dialogue Writer, 1989 - Bharata Naari
- Best Dialogue Writer, 1994 - Anna
- Best Story Writer, 1995 - Ammayi Kapuram

Other Awards

1. AndhraPradesh Sahitya Academy Award for Best Writer
2. Pinnisetty Smarka Award
3. Acharya Aatreya Award
4. Dasari Swarna Kankanam
5. Putchalapalli Sundaraiah Smaraka Award
6. Chatla Sriramulu Trust Award
7. Kandukuri Rangasthala Award
