= Edida Nageswara Rao =

Indian film producer

- Born: Edida Nageswara Rao; 24 April 1934; Kothapeta, Andhra Pradesh
- Died: 4 October 2015 (aged 81); Hyderabad, India
- Occupation: Producer

Edida Nageswara Rao (24 April 1934 – 4 October 2015) was an Indian film producer and actor known for his work in Telugu cinema. He was celebrated for blending artistic values with mainstream appeal, making him one of the most respected producers in the industry. Nageswara Rao began his career with minor acting roles and as a dubbing artist before establishing Poornodaya Movie Creations, a production house that produced several critically acclaimed and commercially successful films.

Nageswara Rao collaborated with prominent directors such as K. Viswanath, Bharathiraja, and Vamsy, creating iconic films like Sankarabharanam (1980), Seethakoka Chilaka (1981), Sagara Sangamam (1983), Sitaara (1984), Swati Mutyam (1986), Swayam Krushi (1987), and Aapadbandhavudu (1992). His productions were renowned for their cultural significance and garnered numerous awards, including National Film Awards and Nandi Awards. Swati Mutyam was India's official entry for the Best Foreign Language Film at the 59th Academy Awards. Additionally, Sankarabharanam and Sagara Sangamam were included in CNN-IBN's list of the "100 Greatest Indian Films of All Time."

In addition to his success in India, several of Nageswara Rao's films gained international recognition and were showcased at festivals like the Moscow International Film Festival. Throughout his career, he won five Nandi Awards and held significant roles in the Telugu film industry, serving as the Secretary of the Telugu Film Producers' Council, Chairman of the Nandi Awards Committee, and a member of the National Film Awards Committee.

== Early life ==
Edida Nageswara Rao was born on 24 April 1934 into a Kapu family to Sattiraju Naidu and Papalakshmi in Kothapeta, East Godavari district, Andhra Pradesh. In 1953, after his father’s retirement, the family settled in Kakinada, where Nageswara Rao spent most of his formative years. He completed his early education in Kothapeta and at McLaurin High School in Kakinada. He later pursued intermediate studies in Vizianagaram before obtaining a Bachelor’s degree in Economics from P. R. Government College, Kakinada. During his college years, he was friends with V. B. Rajendra Prasad, who later became a notable producer.

== Career ==
=== Early career ===
Nageswara Rao developed an early interest in acting and theatre, actively participating in several plays. Although Nageswara Rao was invited to act in V. B. Rajendra Prasad’s first production, Annapurna (1960), he was unable to participate at that time. He settled in Madras and began his acting career, gaining recognition with his role as S. V. Ranga Rao's second son in Aatma Bandhuvu (1964). He appeared in minor roles in films such as Sangeeta Lakshmi (1966), Ranabheri (1968), Pavitra Bandham (1971), Mattilo Manikyam (1971), Chinnanati Snehitulu (1971), Manavadu Danavudu (1972), Neramu Siksha (1973), Bangaru Babu (1973), and Devude Digivaste (1975). Nageswara Rao appeared in minor roles in around 30 films and worked as a dubbing artist for over 100 films before transitioning into film production. His collaboration with director K. Viswanath, beginning with Chinnanati Snehitulu and Neramu Siksha, proved to be a significant aspect of his career.

=== Film production ===
Nageswara Rao collaborated with friends from Kakinada, including Bhaskara Reddy, to dub a Tamil film and release it in Telugu as Venkateswara Kalyanam. The film was financially successful, prompting the group to consider making a straight Telugu film.

==== Siri Siri Muvva (1976) ====
Leveraging his connection with K. Viswanath, Nageswara Rao approached him to direct a new project, resulting in Siri Siri Muvva (1976), where Nageswara Rao managed all production activities as the executive producer. The film was a success, earning profits for the group. It was remade in Hindi as Sargam (1979), which also became a box office hit.

==== Tayaramma Bangarayya (1979) ====
Following the success of Siri Siri Muvva, Nageswara Rao, along with his relative Akasam Sriramulu, founded his production company, Poornodaya Movies, with the aim of producing films that focused on artistic and socially relevant themes. His first production under this banner was Tayaramma Bangarayya (1979), directed by Kommineni Seshagiri Rao. The film, which dealt with an elderly couple counseling young couples on marital issues, became a commercial success and was remade in Tamil as Sathya Sundharam (1981) and in Hindi as Shriman Shrimati (1982).

==== Sankarabharanam (1980) ====
Edida Nageswara Rao, who had a close connection with director K. Viswanath, learned that the latter had a script blending music and literature. Despite Viswanath’s doubts about its appeal, Nageswara Rao decided to produce the film under Poornodaya Movie Creations. The film faced initial struggles in finding distributors but was eventually released in February 1980. Positive word of mouth led to its success, running for 100 days in 12 centres and gaining popularity across multiple states. Made on a modest budget with lesser-known actors, Sankarabharanam grossed over ₹1 crore, bringing Nageswara Rao widespread recognition and cementing the film as a milestone in Telugu cinema. The influence of Sankarabharanam is so significant that the Telugu film industry is often described in terms of "before and after Sankarabharanam."

==== Seethakoka Chilaka (1981) ====
Following the success of Sankarabharanam, Nageswara Rao produced Seethakoka Chilaka (1981), directed by Bharathiraja. This film marked a departure from the classical theme of his previous venture and focused on a romantic story promoting inter-religious harmony. Seethakoka Chilaka became a critical and commercial success, winning the Silver Lotus Award for Best Feature Film in Telugu at the National Film Awards, along with four Nandi Awards. It became a widely referenced film for its portrayal of teenage romance, with many filmmakers citing it as an inspiration for subsequent love stories.

==== Sagara Sangamam (1983) ====
In 1983, Nageswara Rao produced Sagara Sangamam, directed by K. Viswanath, and starring Kamal Haasan and Jayaprada. The film explored human emotions and the artistic journey of a classical dancer, with legendary dancers Gopi Krishna and Birju Maharaj providing choreography. The film received critical acclaim, particularly for Kamal Haasan’s performance and Ilaiyaraaja’s music, which won a National Award. Sagara Sangamam became one of the first non-Hindi films to be released in Russia with international-standard soundtracks and subtitles, opening doors for more of K. Viswanath’s films in international markets. Sagara Sangamam remains one of the most iconic films in Telugu cinema, celebrated for its blending of emotion, art, and storytelling.

==== Sitara (1984) ====
Nageswara Rao's next production was another classic, Sitara (1984). Directed by Vamsy, who had previously worked in the direction department for Nageswara Rao's earlier films, Sitara featured Suman and Bhanupriya in lead roles. The film tells the story of a girl who overcomes traditional societal boundaries to become a movie star. The film garnered three National Film Awards. It was also showcased at several prestigious film festivals, including the International Film Festival of India, the Moscow Film Festival, and the Asian Film Festival.

==== Swathi Muthyam (1986) ====
Following Sitara, Nageswara Rao reunited with K. Viswanath to produce Swathi Muthyam (1986), which starred Kamal Haasan and Radhika. The film tells the story of a young widow who is rescued by a cognitively disabled man. Swathi Muthyam was a box office success and was screened at various international film festivals. The film received the National Film Award for Best Feature Film in Telugu, three Nandi Awards and the Filmfare Award for Best Director – Telugu. Swathi Muthyam became the first Telugu film to be selected as India's official entry for the Academy Awards. It was remade in Hindi as Eeshwar (1989) and in Kannada as Swathi Muthu (2003).

==== Swayamkrushi (1987) ====
In 1987, Nageswara Rao produced Swayamkrushi, a film directed by K. Viswanath and starring Chiranjeevi and Vijayashanti. The film tells the story of a self-made cobbler who rises to wealth and power but faces misunderstanding from his son. The film featured music by Ramesh Naidu, which became highly popular. The film was a critical and commercial success and won Chiranjeevi his first Nandi Award for Best Actor. The film was screened at the International Film Festival of India, the Asia Pacific Film Festival; the film was dubbed into Russian and was screened at the special mention section at the Moscow International Film Festival.

==== Swarakalpana (1989) ====
Nageswara Rao’s next venture was Swarakalpana (1989), directed by Vamsy. This film marked the debut of his son Edida Sriram as the lead actor, with Sita playing the female lead. The film’s music was composed by Gangai Amaran, Ilaiyaraaja's brother, as the latter was unavailable. Despite high expectations, the film struggled at the box office due to competition and poor execution, which led to a major financial loss for Nageswara Rao. It marked the first failure for Nageswara Rao as a producer. The failure of Swara Kalpana also affected Sriram’s acting career.

==== Apathbandhavudu (1992) ====
Nageswara Rao’s final film as a producer was Apathbandhavudu (1992), directed by K. Viswanath and starring Chiranjeevi and Meenakshi Seshadri. The story revolves around a man who sacrifices his own desires to save the woman he loves, who suffers from a mental breakdown after a traumatic incident. The film underperformed at the box office. Despite this, it received critical acclaim, earning Chiranjeevi another Nandi Award for Best Actor.

=== Later years ===
In addition to his work as a producer, Nageswara Rao served as the Secretary of the Telugu Film Producers' Council, Chairman of the Nandi Awards Committee, and as a member of the National Film Awards Committee. However, in his later years, he distanced himself from filmmaking, disillusioned by the increasing commercialization of the industry. He believed films should maintain artistic values, and as the industry shifted towards a more business-oriented approach, he chose to retire. Despite his limited filmography, his contributions to Telugu cinema remain unparalleled, with each of his films holding a special place in the history of Telugu cinema.

== Legacy ==
Edida Nageswara Rao produced ten films that are regarded as milestones in Telugu cinema. His collaborations with directors like K. Viswanath, Bharathiraja, and Vamsy resulted in several critically acclaimed films in the 1980s and 1990s, known for their artistic value and innovative storytelling. His films, often blending artistic integrity with commercial viability, are regarded as some of the finest in Telugu film history. Films such as Sankarabharanam, Sagara Sangamam and Swathi Muthyam are recognized as classics of Indian cinema.

Nageswara Rao focused on producing meaningful, aesthetically rich films, avoiding the commercial formulas popular during his time. His contributions earned him several prestigious accolades, including Nandi Awards, Filmfare Awards South, and National Film Awards. Some of his films were also showcased at international film festivals and dubbed in Russian for overseas audiences. His films demonstrated that strong scripts, rather than star power, could drive commercial success. He was also nominated for the Dadasaheb Phalke Award.

== Personal life ==
Nageswara Rao married Jaya Lakshmi in 1954. The couple had three sons and a daughter. Their son, Edida Sriram, pursued a career in acting, while another, Edida Raja, worked as an executive producer with Geetha Arts. Nageswara Rao died on 4 October 2015, at the age of 81, in a private hospital, following treatment for age-related ailments.

== Filmography ==
Producer

| Year | Film | Credit | Notes |
|---|---|---|---|
| 1976 | Siri Siri Muvva | Executive producer | Winner of two National Film Awards |
| 1979 | Tayaramma Bangarayya | Producer | |
| 1980 | Sankarabharanam | Producer | Winner of four National Film Awards |
| 1981 | Seethakoka Chilaka | Producer | Winner of a National Film Award |
| 1983 | Sagara Sangamam | Producer | Winner of two National Film Awards |
| 1984 | Sitaara | Producer | Winner of three National Film Awards |
| 1986 | Swati Mutyam | Producer | Winner of a National Film Award |
| 1987 | Swayamkrushi | Producer | Winner of a Nandi Award |
| 1989 | Swarakalpana | Producer | |
| 1992 | Aapadbandhavudu | Producer | Winner of five Nandi Awards |

Actor

- Asthulu Anthasthulu (1969)
- Bantrotu Bharya (1974)

== Awards ==
- Lifetime Achievement Award - Sangam Academy

Nandi Awards

- Best Feature Film - Gold - Sankarabharanam (1980)
- Best Feature Film - Gold - Seethakoka Chilaka (1981)
- Third Best Feature Film - Bronze - Sagara Sangamam (1983)
- Best Feature Film - Gold - Swathi Muthyam (1986)
- Third Best Feature Film - Bronze - Aapadbandhavudu (1992)
