= Somberi =

- Directed by: Jonnavithula
- Written by: Jonnavithula
- Produced by: Yerramilli Venkat Rao
- Starring: Ali; Ruksha
- Cinematography: M. V. Raghu
- Edited by: G. G. Krishna Rao
- Music by: Mano
- Production company: Raosan Films
- Release date: 6 June 2008
- Country: India
- Language: Telugu

Somberi (transl. Lazy guy) is a 2008 Indian Telugu-language comedy drama film directed, written by poet Jonnavithula. Ali plays the lead role while Ruksha, Tanikella Bharani, M. S. Narayana, Dharmavarapu Subramanyam play other roles.

== Plot ==
Sombabu (Ali), the only son of well-to-do farmers, is a pampered guy and a wastrel. His laziness is the talk of the town; though, as is usual with this kind of movies, the village folk are equally eloquent about his good nature.

Being a lout, Sombabu wastes his days roaming around the village with his four stooges, swindling foreigners in the guise of a tourist guide, and consuming liquor in buckets. On one such day, he chances upon Rohini (Ruksha), who has come to the village to do a project on the temple. He promptly falls in love with her, but dallies about proposing.

Meanwhile, a team of three villains (Jeeva, Jayaprakash Reddy, A.V.S. Subramanyam) covet the land belonging to Sombabu's parents. They hatch a plan to get Sombabu out of the way, the upshot of it being that our hero is imprisoned for stealing idols. The movie continues its meandering and mind-numbing path, and ends on an expected note.

== Cast ==
- Ali as Sombabu
- Ruksha as Rohini
- Tanikella Bharani as Kavi
- Paruchuri Gopala Krishna
- Dharmavarapu Subramanyam
- M. S. Narayana
- AVS
- Jayaprakash Reddy
- Jeeva
- Banerjee
- Gundu Sudharshan
- Siva Reddy as Siva
- Duvvasi Mohan
- Srinivasa Reddy
- Gautam Raju
- Babloo
- Potti Rambabu
- Gundu Hanumantha Rao
- Ananth
- Jr. Relangi
- Jenny
- KRJ Sharma
- A. V. R. L Narasimha Rao

== Reception ==
A critic from The Hindu wrote that "One can give this film a miss". A critic from Full Hyderabad wrote that "Unless you are as jobless as the hero of this movie is, do not venture to watch this one".
