= Ammayi Kapuram =

- Directed by: Muthyala Subbaiah
- Story by: M. V. S. Haranatha Rao
- Produced by: Pokuri Babu Rao
- Starring: Maheswari; Ali
- Music by: Vandemataram Srinivas
- Production company: T. Krishna Memorial
- Release date: 1994
- Country: India
- Language: Telugu

Ammayi Kapuram (transl. Girl's married life) is a 1994 Indian Telugu-language film directed by Muthyala Subbaiah starring Maheswari, Ali, and Anand. The film is based on dowry problems in Telugu community. It won two Nandi Awards. The film was remade in Kannada as Hettavara Kanasu.

== Cast ==
- Maheswari as Aruna
- Ali
- Anand as Aravind
- Brahmanandam as Professor
- Tatineni Rajeshwari
- Suthi Velu
- Chandra Mohan as Aruna's father
- Sangeeta as Aruna's mother
- Narra Venkateswara Rao
- Kota Srinivasa Rao as Aravind's father
- Chalapathi Rao
- Juttu Narasimham

== Soundtrack ==
Soundtrack was composed by Vandemataram Srinivas.

- "Pelli Eppudu" - S. P. Balasubrahmanyam, Manjula
- "Chamanthi Ro" - SPB, K. S. Chithra
- "Navvule" - Chithra
- "Bale Manchi" - Mano
- "Kanchi Pattu" - SPB, Chithra

== Awards ==
Nandi Awards - 1995

- Third Best Feature Film - M. Nageswara rao
- Best Story Writer - M. V. S. Haranatha Rao
