= Sutradharulu =

- Theatrical release poster
- Directed by: K. Viswanath
- Written by: K. Viswanath; M. V. S. Haranatha Rao (dialogues)
- Produced by: Sudhakar, Karunakar
- Starring: Akkineni Nageswara Rao; Bhanuchander; Ramya Krishna
- Cinematography: Madhu Ambat
- Edited by: G. G. Krishna Rao
- Music by: K. V. Mahadevan
- Production company: Sudarshan Cine Enterprises
- Release date: 4 May 1989
- Running time: 155 mins
- Country: India
- Language: Telugu

Sutradharulu (transl. The Initiators) is a 1989 Indian Telugu-language drama film written and directed by K. Viswanath. It stars Akkineni Nageswara Rao, Bhanuchander, Ramya Krishnan and music is composed by K. V. Mahadevan. It is produced by Sudhakar and Karunakar under the Sudarshan Cine Enterprises banner.

The story set in a rural background portrays the power of non-violence. This message is shown in a short graphic format as an introduction to the film. The film received the 1989 National Film Award for Best Feature Film in Telugu, and three state Nandi Awards (including Third Best Feature Film).

== Plot ==
The film begins in a village where Neelakantam, a tyrant, tramples the public. Hanumanth Dasu and his brother-in-law Rangadasu belong to a Haridasa family. Once, Neelakantam molests an orthodox Brahmin woman, Yashodamma, the wife of a Bhagavathar Acharyulu. So, Yashodamma forfeits herself as his wife and adopts Hanumathu Dasu's son, Tirumala Dasu, intending to give him a good education. After 20 years, Tirumala Dasu returns as a collector and pretends to be the sidekick of Neelakantam. According to the guidance of his father, they had a public revolution, and they succeeded in it. Parallelly, Seeta, the daughter of Rangadasu, who endears Tirumala Dasu, detests him but realizes his virtue afterward. Neelakantam ploys to squat the government lands, for which he initiates Tirumala Dasu to get them to the auction. Here, Tirumala Dasu takes bribes from different landlords and acquires the land from the villagers. Neelakhantam gets enraged and intends to destroy the village with the help of other landlords when Tirumala Dasu stops them. Being conscious of it, the villagers' onslaught on Neelakantam when Hanumath Dasu bars and pacifies them that violence is not the solution to resolve a problem. Finally, Neelakantam realizes his mistake, sheds all his weapons, and reforms to morality. Even Yashodamma reunites with her husband. At last, Hanumanth Dasu affirms that it is wiser to give the best punishment for the egregious to destroy their evil nature than eliminate them.

== Cast ==
- Akkineni Nageswara Rao as Hanumath Dasu
- Bhanuchander as Tirumala Dasu
- Ramya Krishnan as Seethalu
- Satyanarayana as Neelakantam
- Murali Mohan as Rangadasu
- K. R. Vijaya as Yashodamma
- Sujatha as Devamma
- Srilakshmi as Panchashari
- Ashok Kumar as Acharyulu
- Sakshi Ranga Rao
- Vankayala Satyanarayana
- Kota Sankar Rao
- Gokina Rama Rao
- Potti Prasad
- Badi Tataji
- Murali Krishna Maddali

== Soundtrack ==
Sutradharulu

Film score by K. V. Mahadevan
- Released: 1989
- Genre: Soundtrack
- Length: 29:48
- Label: Tips Industries Ltd
- Producer: K. V. Mahadevan

K. V. Mahadevan chronology
Muddula Mavayya (1989)	Sutradharulu (1989)	Muddula Menalludu (1990)

Music composed by K. V. Mahadevan. Music released on Tips Industries Ltd

No.	Title	Lyrics	Singer(s)	Length
1.	"Maharaja Rajasri"	Sirivennela Sitarama Sastry	S. P. Balasubrahmanyam, Mano	2:51
2.	"Lalelo Lillelelo"	C. Narayana Reddy	S. P. Balasubrahmanyam, S. P. Sailaja	4:01
3.	"Kolichinanduku Ninnu Kodandarama"	C. Narayana Reddy	S. P. Balasubrahmanyam, S.P. Sailaja	5:09
4.	"Jolajolamma"	C. Narayana Reddy	S.P. Sailaja	4:57
5.	"Kalalenduku Kathalenduku"	Sirivennela Sitarama Sastry	S. P. Balasubrahmanyam, S.P. Sailaja	2:34
6.	"Yedhukulavadaku"	C. Narayana Reddy	S. P. Balasubrahmanyam	1:57
7.	"Yopam Pushpam Veda"	Traditional (Vedic hymn)	S. P. Balasubrahmanyam, S.P. Sailaja	2:51
8.	"Srirasthu Subhamasthu"	Maadugala Nagaphani Sharma	P.Susheela, V.Kalyani	5:28
Total length:				29:48

== Reception ==
Griddaluru Gopalrao in his review for Zamin Ryot opined that the film lacks novelty, and the talent of the lead cast is not fully realised.

== Awards ==
National Film Awards of 1989

- Best Feature Film in Telugu - Sudhakar & Karunakar

Nandi Awards - 1989

- Third Best Feature Film - Sudhakar & Karunakar
- Best Audiographer – Swaminathan
- Special Jury Award – K. R. Vijaya
