= Swathi Muthyam =

- Poster
- Directed by: K. Viswanath
- Written by: K. Viswanath
- Dialogue by: Sainath Thotapalli
- Produced by: Edida Nageswara Rao
- Starring: Kamal Haasan; Radhika
- Cinematography: M. V. Raghu
- Edited by: G. G. Krishna Rao
- Music by: Ilaiyaraaja
- Production company: Poornodaya Movie Creations
- Distributed by: Sri Venkata Krishna Films; Ramana Movies
- Release date: 13 March 1986
- Running time: 161 minutes
- Country: India
- Language: Telugu

Swathi Muthyam (transl. White pearl) is a 1986 Indian Telugu-language romantic drama film written and directed by K. Viswanath and produced by Edida Nageswara Rao. The film stars Kamal Haasan and Radhika, while Gollapudi Maruti Rao, J. V. Somayajulu, Nirmalamma, Sarath Babu, and Y. Vijaya play supporting roles. The soundtrack and background score were composed by Ilaiyaraaja. Swathi Muthyam depicts the plight of a young widow who is rescued by a man with a cognitive disability.

Swathi Muthyam was a box office success and attained cult status. The film was screened at the Moscow Film Festival, the Asian and African film festival in Tashkent, the 11th IFFI in the inaugural mainstream section. The film received the National Film Award for Best Feature Film in Telugu, three Nandi Awards and the Filmfare Award for Best Director – Telugu. The film was selected by India as its entry for the Best Foreign Language Film for the Academy Awards in 1986, but was not nominated. It is currently the only Telugu film to be selected as the Indian Oscar submission for Best International Feature Film.

The film was later dubbed into Tamil as Sippikkul Muthu, released on October 2, 1986. Upon its success, Viswanath directed its Hindi version Eeshwar (1989) and in Kannada it was remade as Swathi Muthu (2003).

== Plot ==
Sivayya is an elderly, cognitively disabled man living alone with the memories of his late wife, Lalitha. When his adult sons arrive with their families for a holiday, they attempt to persuade him to move in with them, but he is reluctant to leave his home. Intrigued by his life, his granddaughter decides to document his story for her college magazine, prompting a flashback into his past.

Decades earlier, a childhood injury leaves Sivayya with a cognitive disability. He lives under the care of his widowed grandmother, while his exploitative uncle usurps his property and mistreats him. Concurrently, Lalitha, a young widow with a five-year-old son, Balasubramanyam, faces severe hardship. Her wealthy father-in-law, Rao, refuses her shelter because his late son had married her against his wishes. Consequently, Lalitha seeks refuge with her brother Chalapathi and her abusive sister-in-law, enduring the latter's mistreatment due to a lack of options.

Sivayya frequently encounters Lalitha and forms a bond with her over their shared love for music. Distressed by her misery, Sivayya seeks guidance from his grandmother, who notes that Lalitha's life would only improve if a man whole-heartedly accepted her and her son. Inspired by this, Sivayya impulsively ties the Thaali (nuptial thread) around Lalitha's neck during a Sri Rama Navami festival, shocking the conservative villagers. While his grandmother supports the union, his uncle and the village elders vehemently oppose widow remarriage and ostracize the couple. Following a physical altercation between Sivayya and his uncle, his grandmother falls fatally ill; on her deathbed, she blesses the couple and entrusts Sivayya to Lalitha's care.

To escape the hostility, Lalitha relocates the family to the city and secures employment as a music teacher. With the assistance of Subbulu, a generous acquaintance from their village, they begin to settle down. Encouraged to contribute financially, Sivayya finds work at a local temple. Over time, Lalitha grows to deeply love and respect Sivayya, and they consummate their marriage.

Later, Rao visits them, pleading with Lalitha to bring her son to see his dying wife, Rajeshwari. Though reluctant, Lalitha agrees upon Sivayya's insistence. While at Rao's mansion, Rao privately propositions Sivayya, offering to provide Lalitha and her son a luxurious life if Sivayya abandons them. Desiring Lalitha's happiness, Sivayya quietly leaves. However, Lalitha rejects the wealth and returns to Sivayya, assuring him that they cannot be happy without him and revealing that she is pregnant with his child.

The narrative shifts back to the present. Sivayya finally agrees to leave with his sons. On their final night at the house, his sons reminisce about their mother's final moments: years prior, a dying Lalitha had requested Sivayya to carry her to the sacred tulsi plant, where she peacefully passed away in his arms as he sang in agony. The next morning, Sivayya leaves the house with his family, carrying the tulsi plant with him, forever bound to his memories of Lalitha.

== Cast ==
- Kamal Haasan as Sivayya
- Radhika as Lalitha
- Gollapudi Maruthi Rao as Landlord
- J. V. Somayajulu as Lalita's guru
- Nirmalamma as Sivayya's grandmother
- Master Karthik as Balasubrahmanyam, Lalita's first son, whom Sivayya later adopted or accepted after his marriage to Lalitha
- Sarath Babu as Chalapati, Lalita's brother
- Y. Vijaya as Lalita's sister-in-law
- Allu Arjun as Sivayya's grandson
- Major Sundarrajan as Rao
- Deepa
- Dubbing Janaki as Rajyam
- Mallikarjuna Rao
- Suthi Veerabhadra Rao as Guruvaya
- Edida Sriram
- Master Ali

== Production ==
Arun Kumar and Venkatesh were the production designers for the film. The film was shot for nearly 70 days near the shores of Rajahmundry, Torredu, Tadikonda, Pattiseema, Chennai, and Mysore. Allu Arjun did a small role as one of the grandsons of Kamal Haasan. The scene where Haasan dances like someone who cannot dance took so many days to get it "wrong rightly", as Haasan is a seasoned dancer.

== Soundtrack ==
Swathi Muthyam

Soundtrack album by Ilaiyaraaja
- Released: 1986
- Genre: Feature film soundtrack
- Language: Telugu
- Producer: Ilaiyaraaja
External media
Audio
- Official Audio Jukebox on YouTube
Video
- Video Song Jukebox on YouTube

The music was composed by Ilaiyaraaja.

Telugu track listing
| No. | Title | Lyrics | Singer(s) | Length |
|---|---|---|---|---|
| 1. | "Suvvi Suvvi" | C. Narayana Reddy | S. P. Balasubrahmanyam, S. Janaki | 5:43 |
| 2. | "Vatapathra Saayiki" | C. Narayana Reddy | P. Susheela | 4:33 |
| 3. | "Ramaa Kanavemiraa" | C. Narayana Reddy | S. P. Balasubrahmanyam, S. P. Sailaja | 6:54 |
| 4. | "Manasu Palike" | C. Narayana Reddy | S. P. Balasubrahmanyam, S. Janaki | 5:34 |
| 5. | "Chinnaari Ponnaari" | Acharya Aatreya | S. P. Balasubrahmanyam, S. Janaki | 4:45 |
| 6. | "Dharmam Saranam" | C. Narayana Reddy | S. P. Balasubrahmanyam, S. P. Sailaja & Chorus | 2:50 |
| 7. | "Pattu Cheera" | K. Viswanath | S. P. Balasubrahmanyam, S. P. Sailaja | 1:19 |
| 8. | "Vatapathra Saayiki (Pathos)" | C. Narayana Reddy | P. Susheela | 1:04 |
| 9. | "Laali Laali (Ending Song)" | Sirivennela Seetharama Sastry | S. P. Balasubrahmanyam, S. P. Sailaja | 2:53 |
| Total length: | | | | 33:35 |

Tamil track listing
| No. | Title | Lyrics | Singer(s) | Length |
|---|---|---|---|---|
| 1. | "Kannodu Kannana" | Vairamuthu | S. P. Balasubrahmanyam, S. Janaki | 04:49 |
| 2. | "Dharmam Sharanam Gacchaami" | Vairamuthu | S. P. Balasubrahmanyam, S. P. Sailaja | 02:52 |
| 3. | "Varam Thantha Saamikku" | Vairamuthu | P. Susheela | 04:38 |
| 4. | "Manasu Mayangum" | Vairamuthu | S. P. Balasubrahmanyam, S. Janaki | 05:23 |
| 5. | "Pattu Chelai" | Vairamuthu | S. P. Balasubrahmanyam, S. P. Sailaja | 01:22 |
| 6. | "Raman Kathai" | Vairamuthu | S. P. Balasubrahmanyam, S.P. Sailaja | 06:22 |
| 7. | "Thulli Thulli!" | Vairamuthu | S. P. Balasubrahmanyam, S. Janaki | 05:38 |
| 8. | "Varam Thantha Saamikku (sad)" | Vairamuthu | S. P. Balasubrahmanyam, S. P. Sailaja | 03:02 |
| Total length: | | | | 34:06 |

== Reception ==
Baradwaj Rangan said in 2017, "K. Viswanath, this year's recipient of the Dadasaheb Phalke Award, made three films with Kamal Haasan. Sagara Sangamam is the best, Subha Sankalpam the weakest – and between these two films, chronologically and quality-wise, lies Swathi Muthyam". Reviewing the Tamil dubbed version Sippikul Muthu, Jayamanmadhan of Kalki wrote that even if it seems like an aimless story that started somewhere and suddenly stopped, the reality is that we have connected with the story until it happened. Reviewing the same, Balumani of Anna praised the acting, dialogues, music, screenplay and direction.

== Accolades ==
| Award / Film festival | Date of ceremony | Category | Recipient(s) and nominee(s) | Result | Ref(s) |
|---|---|---|---|---|---|
| National Film Awards | September 1987 | Best Feature Film in Telugu | Producer: Edida Nageswara Rao; Director: K. Viswanath | Won | |
| Nandi Awards | 1987 | Best Feature Film - Gold | Producer: Edida Nageswara Rao | Won | |
| Nandi Awards | 1987 | Best Actor | Kamal Haasan | Won | |
| Nandi Awards | 1987 | Best Director | K. Viswanath | Won | |
| Filmfare Awards South | 9 August 1987 | Best Director | K. Viswanath | Won | |

== Remakes ==
| Year | Film | Language | Ref. |
|---|---|---|---|
| 1989 | Eeshwar | Hindi | |
| 2003 | Swathi Muthu | Kannada | |
