= V. Y. Praveen Kumar =

Indian film producer

Praveen Kumar
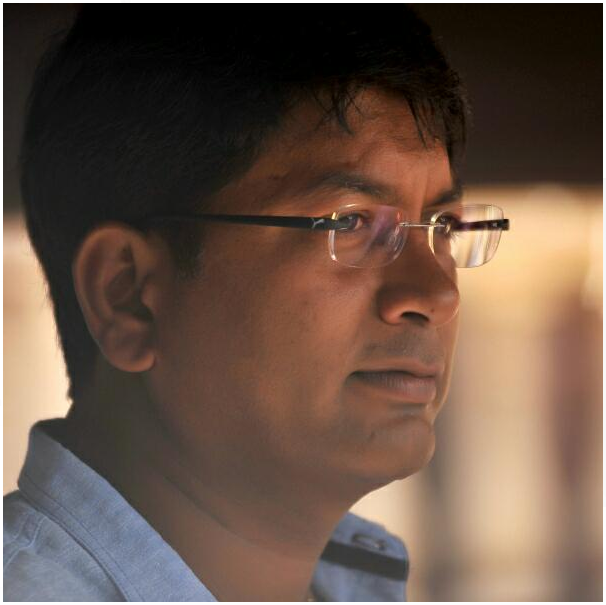
- Born: V Y Praveen; 16 August 1969
- Occupation: Film producer
- Years active: 1995-present

Praveen Kumar is an Indian film producer. He started his career as a production manager with films like Money Money, Gulabi, Anaganaga Oka Roju and Rangeela. He started producing films independently with movies like Kalusukovalani, Bhagyalakshmi Bumper Draw and Pothe Poni in 2006. He is currently working as an executive producer for Ram Charan Tej's TBA films #RC16 and #RC17.

== Career ==
=== 1995 - 2008 ===
Kumar started his career in Telugu film industry as an executive in-charge of production with Rangeela in 1995. Later associated with director RGV for film Money Money as production manager in the same year and also for Krishna Vamshi's film Gulabi.

=== 2009 - Now ===
Since 2009, Praveen kumar is Ram Charan's Business manager, who worked with Ram Charan for movies Magadheera, Oragne, Racha, Naayak, Thoofan, Yevadu, Govindudu Andarivadele and now with Bruce Lee - The Fighter he is also Executive producer.

Year	Title	Notes
2009	Magadheera	Business manager
2010	Orange	Business manager
2012	Racha	Business Manager
2013	Naayak	Business Manager
2013	Thoofan	Business Manager
2014	Yevadu	Business Manager
2014	Govindudu Andarivadele	Business Manager
2015	Bruce Lee	Executive Producer
2016	Dhruva	Executive Producer
2018	Rangasthalam	Executive Producer
2019	Sye Raa Narasimha Reddy	Executive Producer
2025	Game Changer	Business Manager
Tba	RC16	Executive Producer
Tba	RC17	Executive Producer

== Filmography ==
=== As producer ===
Year	Title	Notes	Director
2002	Kalusukovalani	RPG productions	Raghu Raj
2003	Nenu Pelliki Ready	RPG Combines	Venky
2004	Sri Anjaneyam	Co-Producer	Krishna Vamsi
2005	Pothe Poni	Dream Team Entertainments; Received Nandi award	Tammareddy Bharadwaja
2006	Bhagyalakshmi Bumper Draw	Silverscreen movies	Nidhi Prasad
2008	Michael Madana Kamaraju	Silverscreen movies	Nidhi Prasad
2010	Yagam (2010 film)	Silverscreen movies	P. A. Arun Prasad
2015	Bruce Lee - The Fighter	Executive Producer	Srinu Vaitla
2016	Dhruva	Executive Producer	Surender Reddy
2018	Rangasthalam	Executive Producer	

=== Early career ===
Year	Title	Notes
1995	Money Money	Production Manager
1995	Rangeela	executive in charge of production
1996	Gulabi	Production Manager
1996	Deyyam	executive in charge of production
1997	Anaganaga Oka Roju	executive in charge of production
1997	Daud: Fun on the Run	executive in charge of production
1997	Sindhooram	executive in charge of production
1998	Chandralekha (1998 film)	executive in charge of production
1998	Antahpuram	executive in charge of production
1999	Samudram (1999 film)	executive in charge of production
2002	Shakti: The Power	executive in charge of production
2001	Murari	executive in charge of production
2002	Khadgam	executive in charge of production
