= Swathi Kiranam =

1992 Telugu film directed by Kasinathuni Viswanath

- Poster
- Directed by: K. Viswanath
- Written by: M. V. S. Haranatha Rao (dialogue); Jandhyala (dialogue)
- Screenplay by: K. Viswanath
- Story by: K. Viswanath
- Produced by: V. Madhusudhana Rao
- Starring: Mammootty; Radhika Sarathkumar; Master Manjunath
- Cinematography: Kasthuri
- Edited by: G. G. Krishna Rao
- Music by: K. V. Mahadevan
- Production companies: Meher Chaithanya Niketan Trust, Meher Nagar
- Distributed by: Swathi Productions
- Release date: 1 January 1992
- Running time: 130 minutes
- Language: Telugu

Swathi Kiranam (transl. Dawn of Light) is a 1992 Telugu-language musical drama film directed by K. Viswanath. Produced by V. Madhusudhana Rao, the film starred Mammootty in his Telugu debut, Master Manjunath, and Radhika, along with Achyuth, Jayanthi, Sakshi Ranga Rao, Dubbing Janaki and Dharmavarapu Subramanyam in supporting roles. The film is about an egotistical music teacher envious of the immense talent of his prodigious young disciple, and depicts their tumultuous relationship.

Swathi Kiranam was featured in the Indian panorama section of the 24th IFFI, the Asia Pacific Film Festival, the Moscow Film Festival and the AISFM Film Festival. The film has garnered the National Film Award for Best Female Playback Singer, Filmfare Award for Best Music Direction and the Nandi Award for Best Home-viewing Feature Film. Over the years, the film has accumulated a cult following for its music, and lyrics. The lyrics were penned by Vennelakanti, Sirivennela Seetarama Sastry, C. Narayana Reddy, and Madugula Nagaphani Sarma.

== Plot ==
In Tapeswaram, a disheveled old man lives as a recluse near a local temple, perpetually haunted by the apparitions of a young boy singing. When he wanders into a nearby village, local shepherds mistake him for a thief and hand him over to the police. Inspector Radhakrishna recognizes the man as Anantha Rama Sharma, a once-celebrated Carnatic music maestro hailed as Sangeeta Samrat (Emperor of Music), who had mysteriously vanished four years prior. Radhakrishna alerts his aunt, a music teacher from their native village, and Sharma's past is subsequently detailed through a flashback.

Sharma is an immensely gifted but arrogant classical composer and vocalist, whose intense pride is demonstrated when he rejects the Padma Shri award, declaring that his fellow recipients are artistically inferior and unworthy of sharing a stage with him. Meanwhile, Gangadhar, an innocent schoolboy, belongs to a family running an eatery. Disregarding conventional academic and musical instruction, Gangadhar prefers to sing by the riverside, routinely experimenting with classical compositions by effortlessly transposing them into alternative ragas. While his school teacher and parents initially misunderstand his non-conformist style, they quickly recognize his extraordinary innate genius.

During a religious congregation attended by Sharma and his wife, Sharada, Gangadhar is given an opportunity to perform. Earlier in the event, Sharma had interpolated a traditional Vedic chant with his own contemporary melody. Gangadhar emulates this exact improvisational approach during his own recital, which outrages Sharma. Sharma publicly rebukes the boy, dogmatically asserting that classical compositions must strictly be rendered as originally intended. Humiliated and confused by Sharma's hypocrisy, a distraught Gangadhar attempts suicide but is saved by his parents, who convince him to apologize to Sharma.

When Gangadhar visits Sharma's residence, he overhears Sharma and Sharada composing a piece commissioned by the Bharathi Peetham cultural organization. He takes notes on the melody and interacts with Sharada, who subtly acknowledges her husband’s rigid double standards and encourages Gangadhar to audition for Sharma’s academy. During the audition at an ashram, Gangadhar delivers an innovative re-rendition of the composition "Pranathi Pranathi". Sharma flatly rejects him, but Sharada develops a deep maternal attachment to the boy and quietly supports his artistic growth. As Gangadhar's reputation grows across the region, Sharma becomes increasingly unsettled, secretly replaying a cassette tape of Gangadhar's audition in private.

At a felicitation event honoring Sharma, Gangadhar requests permission to sing a tribute to him. His complex vocal improvisations during the song "Aanathi Neeyera" earn widespread public acclaim. Soon after, Sharma is forced to felicitate Gangadhar at a separate cultural function. As Gangadhar's fame eclipses his own, the Bharathi Peetham requests Sharma to collaborate with the boy on future compositions. Under the pretense of mentorship, Sharma invites Gangadhar to reside at his house. In private, Sharma systematically dismisses Gangadhar's musical ideas as lifeless, while secretly transcribing the boy's unique melodies for his own use.

Seeking inspiration, Gangadhar retreats to a waterfall, where he overhears a wandering mystic singing a folk hymn to Lord Shiva. Inspired, Gangadhar composes "Shivani Bhavani" and presents it to Sharma, who promptly rejects it. Shortly after, Gangadhar attends a concert where he witnesses Sharma performing "Shivani Bhavani" as his own original work. Devastated by the betrayal, Gangadhar confides in Sharada, expressing grief that while he received her maternal love, he could never secure Sharma's parental affection. Sharada initially defends her husband, misinterpreting his secret transcriptions as a form of rigorous, tough love. However, when she confronts Sharma, he suffers a severe panic attack and angrily confesses his consuming jealousy, admitting he would rather see Gangadhar dead than endure his artistic superiority.

While Sharma recovers from a heart attack in the hospital, a guilt-ridden Gangadhar disappears, leaving behind a letter. He explains that while he failed to recognize Sharma’s professional envy earlier, he cannot bear to cause Sharada domestic misery by alienating her husband, and resolves to end his life so his music will no longer trouble Sharma. Sharma and Sharada rush to the railway station, only to find Gangadhar’s deceased body being returned to the village. A devastated Sharada bitterly asks Sharma whether the prodigy was killed by the gods above or by the man standing beside her.

In the present day, a guilt-ridden Sharma is encouraged by the inspector's aunt to seek redemption by finally confronting his past and embracing music once more. Four years after his disappearance, Sharma returns to reunite with Sharada, who has renamed their music school in Gangadhar’s memory. He finds her conducting a class for young children. Sharma quietly joins the students in their foundational vocal exercises; his voice is frail, weak, and out of tune, while a tearful Sharada continues to lead the lesson.

== Cast ==
- Mammootty as Anantha Rama Sharma
- Master Manjunath as Gangadhar
- Radhika Sarathkumar as Sarada
- Achyuth as Inspector Radhakrishna
- Jayanthi as Radhakrishna's aunt
- Dharmavarapu Subramanyam as Gangadhar's father
- Sakshi Ranga Rao
- Dubbing Janaki
- Ananth Babu
- Madugula Nagaphani Sarma as Folk Singer (cameo)

== Production ==
This film was Mammootty's Telugu debut, and director K. Viswanath had approached S. P. Balasubrahmanyam to dub for the actor in the film. But Mammootty asked Viswanath if he could dub for himself in Telugu, with his own voice, even though he did not know the language at the time. According to SPB, he said: "I can work hard. If you still do not like it, just do it with Balu Sir." Though he could not voice the dialogues, SPB still sang for Mammootty in the film.

During the composing sessions of this film, the music director K. V. Mahadevan was hospitalized. Hence his close associate and disciple Pughazhendi composed all the songs in the film. However, due to his devotion towards the music director, he still credited K. V. Mahadevan instead of himself. The song “Aanati Neeyara” is written in Thyagaraja Pancharatna Krithi style by Sirivennela Sitaramasastry. Pancharatna Krithis are unique compositions where there are numerous charanams which progress into a crescendo. This song fetched Vani Jayaram the National Film Award for Best Female Playback Singer. This film has numerous lyrical compositions sung by different singers, with strikingly different deliveries. "Pranathi Pranathi" is first sung in Naata by the character of Mammootty which is tuned in a different raaga for Master Manjunath to sing. On the other hand, both renditions of the song "Shivani Bhavani" are sung in the same tune, but with differing emotional levels to reflect the two lead characters. This film also marked the first and last collaboration between veteran singers Vani Jayaram and K. S. Chithra.

== Soundtrack ==
All music is composed by Pughazhendi but credited to K. V. Mahadevan.

Track list
No.	Title	Lyrics	Singer(s)	Length
1.	"Theli Manchu"	Sirivennela Seetharama Sastry	Vani Jayaram	4:43
2.	"Om Guru (Slokam)"	Traditional	Vani Jayaram	1:53
3.	"Sruthi Neevu"	C. Narayana Reddy	Vani Jayaram, K. S. Chithra	4:26
4.	"Shivani Bhavani (Male)"	Sirivennela Seetharama Sastry	S. P. Balasubrahmanyam	3:28
5.	"Sangeetha Saahitya"	C. Narayana Reddy	S. P. Balasubrahmanyam	4:49
6.	"Pranathi Pranathi (Female)"	C. Narayana Reddy	Vani Jayaram	4:20
7.	"Jaliga Jabilamma"	Sirivennela Seetharama Sastry	Vani Jayaram, K. S. Chithra	3:39
8.	"Shivani Bhavani (Female)"	Sirivennela Seetharama Sastry	Vani Jayaram	3:29
9.	"Konda Konallo"	Vennelakanti Rajeswara Prasad	Vani Jayaram	4:48
10.	"Pranathi Pranathi (Male)"	C. Narayana Reddy	S. P. Balasubrahmanyam, K. S. Chithra	4:05
11.	"Aanathineeyara"	Sirivennela Seetharama Sastry	Vani Jayaram	7:10
12.	"Vaishnavi Bhargavi"	Sirivennela Seetharama Sastry	Vani Jayaram	4:14
Total length:				51:04

== Reception ==
The film was released on 1 January 1992 on New Year's Day to widespread critical acclaim. In a retrospect interview of the film by iQlik Movies, they call the film an unmistakable epic by writing: "Swathi Kiranam is called an unmistakable epic because it explores the hidden side of a successful Carnatic Music singer - his inner fears, his insecurities just because he watches a child prodigy grow in front of his own eyes." They further go on to praise the performance of the lead cast. They then praise the script, writing: "Dialogues written by Jandhyala are thought provoking and heart touching. The line where a tormented Gangadharam says ,” Mimmalni choosthe maa amma gari la anipisthunnaru..kaani ayyagaru endhuku thandri la kanipinchatledho ardham kavatledhu” (“While I can see a mother in you, I don’t know why I am unable to see a father in sir!”) to Anantha Sarma's wife can make anybody tearful." Idlebrain included the film in its series of "films that were box-office failures but, that deserve to be ranked as some of the best movies of Telugu industry."

== Other Versions ==
- Sur – The Melody of Life (2002 film) by Tanuja Chandra
- Qala (2022 film) by Anvita Dutt

== Accolades ==
The film won 1 National Film Award, 1 Nandi Award and 1 Filmfare Award South each. The film was the inaugural recipient of the Nandi Award for Akkineni Award for Best Home-viewing Feature Film.

Year	Nominee / work	Award	Result
1992	Vani Jayaram (for song "Aanathi Neeyara")	National Film Award for Best Female Playback Singer	Won
1992	K. V. Mahadevan	Filmfare Award for Best Music Director – Telugu	Won
1991	V. Madhusudhana Rao	Nandi Award for Akkineni Award for Best Home-viewing Feature Film	Won
