= Sitara (1984 film) =

Sitāra
- Poster
- Directed by: Vamsy
- Based on: Mahal lo Kokila by Vamsy
- Produced by: Edida Nageswara Rao
- Starring: Bhanupriya; Suman; Sarath Babu; Subhalekha Sudhakar
- Cinematography: M. V. Raghu
- Edited by: Anil Malnad
- Music by: Ilayaraja
- Distributed by: Lakshmi Films
- Release date: 12 April 1984
- Country: India
- Language: Telugu

Sitāra (transl. Star) is a 1984 Indian Telugu-language drama film written and directed by Vamsy. The film stars Bhanupriya in the titular role alongside Suman, Sarath Babu and Subhalekha Sudhakar. It marks the debut of Bhanupriya in Telugu cinema and is based on Vamsy's own novel Mahal lo Kokila (transl. Cuckoo inside the mansion). The film explores the friendship between two individuals set against the backdrop of rural life, zamindari system, the Indian film industry, and paparazzi culture. Sitara received critical acclaim upon its release and is considered a cult classic. The film's soundtrack became a chartbuster, and it garnered three National Film Awards. It was also showcased at several prestigious film festivals, including the International Film Festival of India, the Moscow Film Festival, and the Asian Film Festival.

== Plot ==
Devadas (Subhalekha Sudhakar) is a professional photographer. Once, on a train, he meets a melancholic woman (Bhanupriya) who boards the train without a valid ticket. He helps her with the money and tries to strike up a conversation. She only tells him that her name is "Sitaara" and that she has nowhere to go in the big city. The reticent Sitara intrigues Devadas, who takes pity on her and offers her shelter at his home. Devadas sees the photogenic face of Sitaara and helps her become a model and film star. Eventually, as he manages her dates and schedules, he develops a liking for her. When Sitaara vehemently refuses to go to a certain village for shooting, he gets insulted by the producer. An upset Devadas demands an explanation and forces her to reveal her traumatic past.

Sitaara reveals that she is the surviving sister of a deceased protective and proud zamindar. She was always kept indoors and restrained by her brother, as was the custom of rich landlords of the time. The zamindar had heavy debts and concealed this fact from the people of the village, hiding the misfortune behind the walls of his palace, with hopes of winning a case in the court that would restore the ancestral wealth and thence, the glory of his family.

During Dasara, a group of drama artists come to the village to perform and make their living. Every day, they start their performance first at the zamindar's home per the custom. The zamindar is away and there is no one to watch or reward them. The youngest artist of the troupe, Raju is irritated by this, but others in the troupe convince him to perform in front of the zamindar's closed doors. One day, Sitaara watches Raju's performance through a broken window and takes a liking to him. He sees her watching him, and the next day performs with even more vigour, surprising his colleagues.

Eventually, Sitaara falls in love with Raju and they go to the village fair together. When the zamindar learns of the affair, he quietly sends henchmen to kill Raju. When Sitaara finds out, unable to confront her brother, she suffers silently. In the meantime, the zamindar loses his court case. Afraid of losing the prestige that he has been trying to save, he kills himself and makes it seem like a robbery gone wrong. Sitaara runs away from the village and meets Devadas on the train.

After her past is revealed, Devadas tries to help her out by going back to the village. He learns that Raju was not killed and tries to track him and leaves Sitaara alone in the city for a while. Meanwhile, Sitaara attempts suicide after coming to know that Devadas wanted to marry her, through the news in a film tabloid. Raju learns that Sitaara is searching for him and comes to the city. Devadas manages to unite them in the end.

== Cast ==
- Suman as Raju
- Sarath Babu as Chander
- Bhanupriya as Sitara / Kokila
- Subhalekha Sudhakar as Devadas
- Edida Sriram as Tilak
- J. V. Somayajulu
- Mallikarjuna Rao
- Rallapalli
- Sakshi Ranga Rao
- M. Prabhakar Reddy
- Dham
- K. K. Sharma
- Bheemiswara Rao
- Jit Mohan Mitra
- Sattibabu
- Ali
- Saroja
- Vijaya Chamundeswari
- Bindu Madhavi
- Zahida Rahool

== Production ==
Vamsy approached Edida Nageswara Rao with the script for this film. Because his last film was not well received by the audience, he hesitated to make a movie, but he was convinced by their common friend Thadi Babji. In the initial script, the hero dies, but Nageswara Rao wanted the hero to be alive. So he changed the script to fulfill his wish.

Vamsy thought of roping in Radha for the lead role. But because of budget restrictions, Nageswara Rao asked him to choose another actress. Then he recollected Bhanupriya who had just visited their office that morning. They did a photoshoot and selected her as a heroine for their movie.

Vamsy selected Venkatagiri fort to be an apt location for their story. He knew Saikrishna Yachendra, the second son of Venkatagiri Raja. With that connection, they could easily get permission for shooting.

== Soundtrack ==
All lyrics are written by Veturi; all music is composed by Ilaiyaraaja. "Vennello Godari Andam" is based on "Dhoorathil Naan Kanda" from the Tamil film Nizhalgal (1980).

Songs
No.	Title	Playback	Length
1.	"Omkaara Panjara Sukhee"	S. P. Balasubrahmanyam, S. P. Sailaja
2.	"Jilibili Palukulu"	S.P. Balu, S. Janaki
3.	"Kinnerasaani Vachindammaa"	S.P. Balu, S.P. Sailaja
4.	"Kukukoo Kukukoo"	S.P. Balu, S. Janaki
5.	"Nee Gaanam"	S. Janaki
6.	"Vennello Godari Andam"	S. Janaki
Total length:			27:32

== Awards ==
Year	Nominee / work	Award	Result
1985	Edida Nageswara Rao, Vamsy	National Film Award for Best Feature Film in Telugu	Won
1985	S. Janaki for "Vennello Godhari"	National Film Award for Best Female Playback Singer	Won
1985	Anil Malnad	National Film Award for Best Editing	Won
1985	S. P. Ramanadham	Nandi Award for Best Audiographer	Won
