= Sagara Sangamam =

1983 Indian film by K. Viswanath

- Poster
- Directed by: K. Viswanath
- Written by: K. Viswanath; Jandhyala (dialogues)
- Produced by: Edida Nageswara Rao
- Starring: Kamal Haasan; Jaya Prada; S. P. Sailaja
- Cinematography: P. S. Nivas
- Edited by: G. G. Krishna Rao
- Music by: Ilaiyaraaja
- Production companies: Arunachalam; Vaahini
- Distributed by: Poornodaya Movie Creations
- Release date: 3 June 1983
- Running time: 160 minutes
- Country: India
- Language: Telugu

Sagara Sangamam (transl. Confluence with the ocean) is a 1983 Indian Telugu-language dance film written and directed by K. Viswanath and produced by Edida Nageswara Rao. The film stars Kamal Haasan, Jaya Prada, Sarath Babu, S. P. Sailaja and Chakri Toleti. Upon release, the film received positive reviews and became a box office hit. The film has received two National Film Awards, three Filmfare Awards South and the Nandi Award for Best Feature Film (Bronze).

The film was dubbed into Tamil and Malayalam and released as Salangai Oli and Sagara Sangamam respectively. Kamal Haasan had lent his voice for all three versions. The film was premiered at the 9th IFFI in 1984, and retrospectively at the 45th IFFI in the Celebrating Dance in Indian cinema section. The film was dubbed into Russian, and was screened at the Moscow International Film Festival, Asia Pacific Film Festival and AISFM Film Festival. Salangai Oli was released on the same day as Sagara Sangamam.

== Plot ==
Balakrishna aka Balu is an economically disadvantaged but highly talented classical dancer proficient in Bharatanatyam, Kuchipudi, Kathak, and Kathakali forms. His refusal to compromise the purity of classical arts for commercial cinema success keeps him unemployed. He lives in poverty with his close friend Raghu, while his aging mother works menial jobs to help him achieve his dreams. Madhavi, a wealthy woman, recognizes Balu's immense talent at a temple and arranges an opportunity for him to participate in a prestigious national dance festival in Delhi. However, just before their planned departure, Balu's mother passes away from illness, leaving him deeply disheartened.

Following Raghu's wedding, Balu acknowledges his feelings for Madhavi and approaches her father to propose marriage. Her father reveals that Madhavi is already married but was separated from her husband, Venugopala Rao, after her father lost his wealth and could not fulfil dowry expectations. Although Madhavi reciprocates Balu's feelings and intends to confess them, Venugopala Rao unexpectedly arrives. Expressing deep regret over the separation, Rao selflessly proposes to facilitate the union between Balu and Madhavi. However, recognizing Rao's genuine remorse and virtue, Balu refuses the offer and instead reunites the married couple, sacrificing his own love.

Years pass, and Balu, unable to cope with the heartbreak, becomes a chronic alcoholic. He makes a meager living working as an objective art critic for a local newspaper. After publishing a brutal, honest review pointing out the technical flaws of an aspiring Bharatanatyam dancer named Sailaja, Balu is humiliated and fired by the editor's son, Kishore, who is also Sailaja’s boyfriend. Before leaving, Balu publicly demonstrates Sailaja's mistakes and proves his own superior command over the dance form. Shortly after, Balu is diagnosed with terminal liver cirrhosis.

Madhavi, who is now a widow, reads the newspaper report and, after learning of Balu's condition from her daughter Sailaja, visits Raghu. Realizing that Balu has lost all purpose in life, Madhavi resolves to rehabilitate him by arranging for him to train Sailaja. At Raghu's insistence that Balu might not survive the emotional shock of learning she is a widow, Madhavi conceals her marital status and stays out of Balu's sight. A reluctant Sailaja behaves rudely toward Balu, who only accepts the teaching position to fund the medical treatment of Raghu's ailing wife, while refusing to give up his alcoholism.

During a heavy rainstorm, a heavily intoxicated Balu dances precariously on the edge of a deep well. To rescue him, a desperate Madhavi steps forward wearing kumkuma on her forehead, falsely claiming her husband is still alive to keep Balu emotionally stable. Sailaja misinterprets her mother's deep bond with Balu and threatens to leave home. However, Balu accidentally witnesses Madhavi performing her late husband's annual death rituals and realizes the truth. The shock causes his health to fail completely, leaving him bedridden.

Raghu steps in and forces a reluctant Sailaja to return to the hospital, where Balu rigorously trains her from his bedside, determined to have her carry forward his artistic legacy. At a major cultural event hosted by the hospital, Sailaja learns of Balu's terminal state from the speeches made by Madhavi and Balu. Deeply moved, she delivers a flawless performance that fills her mother and guru with pride. Balu passes away peacefully mid-performance. To avoid disrupting Sailaja's recital, Raghu silently carries Balu's body away into the courtyard, while Madhavi follows closely behind, holding an umbrella over Balu to shield him from the pouring rain.

== Cast ==
- Kamal Haasan as Balakrishnan Natarajamoorthy "Balu"
- Jaya Prada as Madhavi
- Sarath Babu as Ragupathy
- S. P. Sailaja as Sailaja, Madhavi's daughter
- Sakshi Ranga Rao as Balu's uncle
- Dubbing Janaki as Janaki Amma, Balu's mother
- Chakri Toleti as Teen photographer
- Potti Prasad as Madhavi's servant
- S. K. Misro as Film choreographer
- Manju Bhargavi as Classical dancer
- Geetha as Dance assistant
- Mohan Sharma as Venugopalarathnam Rao, Madhavi's husband

== Production ==
Kamal and R. C. Sakthi wanted to make a film on a subject, about a dancer who was an alcoholic, which they named "Anupallavi" when K. Viswanath approached him with a similar subject, Kamal felt he had to do the film. On the sets of the film, Gopi Krishna, one of the choreographers, insisted that Kamal should train for at least a month. Kamal was one of the top stars of the time, doing multiple shifts, and had to find the time. Kamal said it was the "greatest sacrifice from my side". Playback singer S. P. Sailaja was recruited to play a prominent role, thereby making her debut as an actress and it also remains the only film she had acted in so far. K. Viswanath who is related to Sailaja, decided that she would fit perfectly in the role of Kamal Haasan's pupil, after seeing the photos. Sailaja recalled: "I was reluctant as I was trained only in Bharatanatyam, but in the film I had to perform other dance forms like Kathak too. While shooting my introductory song "Om Namah Shivaya" at Ravindra Bharathi, I became nervous on the stage and refused to act". Chakri Toleti did the role of a photographer boy in the film. Art director Thota Tharani said that the budget was drastically cut for the song in which Kamal dances on the well.

== Soundtrack ==
The film score and soundtrack was composed by Ilaiyaraaja. The lyrics for the Telugu version were written by Veturi, while Vairamuthu has written the lyrics for the Tamil version and Sreekumaran Thampi for Malayalam version. The song "Vedam Anuvanavuna" is based on Hamsanandi Raga. The song "Om Nama Sivaya" is based on Hindolam Raga. The song "Naada Vinodam" is based on Shree ranjani Raga. The song "Balakanakamaya" is based on a Thyagaraja kirtana and was composed on Atana raga . The song "Thakita Thadimi" is based on Shanmukhapriya Raga . "Vevela Gopemmala" is based on Mohanam raga and "Mounamelanoyi Ee Marapurani Reyi" is based on Pahadi raga .

=== Sagara Sangamam (Original Telugu soundtrack) ===
All lyrics are written by Veturi Sundararama Murthy except where noted; all music is composed by Ilaiyaraaja.

No.	Title	Lyrics	Singer(s)	Length
1.	"Baala Kanakamaya Chela"	Tyagaraja	S. Janaki
2.	"Mounamelanoyi Ee Marapurani Reyi"		S. P. Balasubrahmanyam, S. Janaki
3.	"Naada Vinodamu Natya Vilasamu"		S. P. Balasubrahmanyam, S. P. Sailaja
4.	"Om Namah Shivaaya"		S. Janaki
5.	"Thakita Thadimi"		S. P. Balasubrahmanyam
6.	"Vedam Anuvanuvuna Nadam"		S. P. Balasubrahmanyam, S. P. Sailaja
7.	"Vevela Gopemmala"		S. P. Balasubrahmanyam, S. P. Sailaja

=== Salangai Oli (Tamil soundtrack) ===
All lyrics are written by Vairamuthu except where noted; all music is composed by Ilaiyaraaja.

No.	Title	Lyrics	Singer(s)	Length
1.	"Baala Kanakamaya Chela (Telugu)"	Tyagaraja	S. Janaki	03:52
2.	"Mounamana Neram"		S. P. Balasubrahmanyam, S. Janaki	04:33
3.	"Nadha Vinodhangal Nadana Sandhoshangal"		S. P. Balasubrahmanyam, S. P. Sailaja	03:58
4.	"Om Namah Shivaaya"		S. Janaki	04:41
5.	"Thakita Thadimi Thakita Thadimi Thamdhaanaa"		S. P. Balasubrahmanyam	04:12
6.	"Vedham Anuvilum Oru Naadham"		S. P. Balasubrahmanyam, S. P. Sailaja	05:22
7.	"Vaan Pole Vannam Kondu"		S. P. Balasubrahmanyam, S. P. Sailaja	04:34

=== Sagara Sangamam (Malayalam soundtrack) ===
All lyrics are written by Sreekumaran Thampi except where noted; all music is composed by Ilaiyaraaja.

No.	Title	Lyrics	Singer(s)	Length
1.	"Baala Kanakamaya (Telugu)"	Tyagaraja	S. Janaki
2.	"Mounam Polum Madhuram"		P. Jayachandran, S. Janaki
3.	"Nadha Vinodam"		S. P. Balasubrahmanyam, S. P. Sailaja
4.	"Om Namah Shivaya"		S. Janaki
5.	"Thakita Thadimi"		P. Jayachandran
6.	"Vedham Anuvil"		S. P. Balasubrahmanyam, S. P. Sailaja
7.	"Varmegha Varnante Maaril"		P. Jayachandran, P. Madhuri

== Release and reception ==
Sagara Sangamam was released on 3 June 1983. The film had a highly successful run in the theatres; it ultimately ended as a box-office success. The Tamil version Salangai Oli was released on the same day as Sagara Sangamam and successful run in the theatres, being the first film that ran more than 100 days in the four South Indian states of Andhra Pradesh, Karnataka, Tamil Nadu, and Kerala. Reviewing Tamil version Salangai Oli for Kalki gave a mixed review praising the song "Thakita Thadhimi" but felt for other songs K. V. Mahadevan should have been approached and criticised the film's length and concluded saying its true that art never dies but the film ?. Anna newspaper praised the acting, music, cinematography and direction.

== Awards and recognitions ==
The film was premiered at the 9th IFFI in 1984, and retrospectively at the 45th IFFI in the Celebrating Dance in Indian cinema section. The film was dubbed into Russian, and was screened at the Moscow International Film Festival, Asia Pacific Film Festival.

List of awards and nominations
Award	Date of ceremony	Category	Nominee(s)	Result	Ref.
National Film Awards	June 1984	National Film Award for Best Music Direction	Ilaiyaraaja	Won	
National Film Awards	June 1984	National Film Award for Best Male Playback Singer	S. P. Balasubrahmanyam	Won	
Nandi Awards	1983	Nandi Award for Third Best Feature Film - Bronze	K. Viswanath (Director); Edida Nageswara Rao (Producer)	Won	
Nandi Awards	1983	Nandi Award for Best Actor	Kamal Haasan	Won	
Nandi Awards	1983	Nandi Award for Best Female Playback Singer	S. Janaki	Won	
Nandi Awards	1983	Nandi Award for Best Art Director	Thota Tharani	Won	
Nandi Awards	1983	Nandi Award for Best Editor	G. G. Krishna Rao	Won	
Nandi Awards	1983	Nandi Award for Best Audiographer	A.R. Swaminadhan	Won	
Filmfare Awards South	1984	Filmfare Award for Best Actor – Telugu	Kamal Haasan	Won	
Filmfare Awards South	1984	Filmfare Award for Best Actress – Telugu	Jaya Prada	Won	
Filmfare Awards South	1984	Filmfare Award for Best Director – Telugu	K. Viswanath	Won	

== Legacy ==
The film is listed among CNN-IBN's list of 100 greatest Indian films of all time.
