= J. V. Somayajulu =

Indian actor (d. 2004)

- Somayajulu seen in a film
- Born: Jonnalagadda Venkata Somayajulu; 30 July 1928; Srikakulam district, Madras Presidency, British India
- Died: 24 April 2004 (aged 75); Hyderabad, Andhra Pradesh, India
- Occupation: Actor
- Years active: 1976-2004
- Notable work: Sankara Sastry in Sankarabharanam, Tyagaraja in Tyagayya
- Children: 3
- Relatives: J. V. Ramana Murthy (brother)

Jonnalagadda Venkata Somayajulu (30 July 1920 or c. 1928 – 24 April 2004) was an Indian actor known for his works in Telugu cinema and a few Tamil, Kannada, Hindi and Malayalam films. In 1981, he received the Filmfare Award for Best Actor – Telugu for his work in the classic Sankarabharanam. On the centenary of Indian cinema, Forbes included his performance in the film among the 25 Greatest Acting Performances of Indian Cinema.

Some of the other films that earned Somayajulu a good reputation as an actor were Allari Pillalu, Nelavanka, Rowdy Alludu, Swathi Muthyam, Tyagayya, Saptapadi, Vijeta, Appula Appa Rao, Vamsa Vruksham and the Hindi film Jaag Utha Insan. He portrayed the guru character of Sri Raghavendra in the Tamil film Sri Raghavendrar. He made a 13-episode television serial based on the play Kanyasulkam. He also portrayed A.C. Bhaktivedanta Swami Prabhupada, in the biographical series Abhay Charan.

== Personal life and career ==
Jonnalagadda Venkata Somayajulu was born in Lukalam Agraharam in Srikakulam district of present-day Andhra Pradesh. His father worked as an Inspector in the Prohibition and Excise department in Gudivada and other towns. He spent his childhood in Vizianagaram and also participated in stage dramas there. He was a government official and worked as a Deputy collector for Mahabub Nagar district.

His career spanned five decades in stage dramas, films and television. His passion for Gurazada Apparao's play, Kanyasulkam, was such that he, along with his actor brother J V Ramana Murthy, played it about 500 times in 45 years. His exposition of the delightfully notorious character, "Ramappanthulu" in the play, has become legendary. The woman behind the success of Somayajulu was his mother Saradamma. Somayajulu had two sons and a daughter.

== Other works ==
For the development of Telugu theatre in the twin cities Hyderabad and Secunderabad, Somayajulu established 'Rasaranjani' along with his contemporaries, Chatla Sriramulu, Garimella Rama Murthy and Rallapalli. Somayajulu worked in the Directorate of Cultural Affairs before retiring from government service.

== Death ==
Somayajulu died of heart attack in Hyderabad in 2004 at a reported age of 76.

== Filmography ==
=== Telugu films ===
List of Telugu films and roles
Year	Title	Role(s)	Notes
1976	Jyoti		
1980	Sankarabharanam	Shankara Sastry	Filmfare Award for Best Actor – Telugu
1980	Vamsa Vruksham		
1981	Tyagayya	Tyagayya	
1981	Saptapadi	Yajulu	
1982	Pelleedu Pillalu	P V Rao	
1983	Nelavanka	Raheem	
1983	Sitaara		
1985	Devalayam		
1985	Aalapaana		
1985	Vijetha	Narasimham	
1986	Tandra Paparayudu		
1986	Sri Shirdi Saibaba Mahathyam	Nana Chandorkar	
1986	Manavudu Danavudu		
1986	Devalayam		
1986	Thathayya Kankanam		
1986	Naa Pilupe Prabhanjanam	Janakiramaiah	
1986	Ugra Narasimham		
1986	Swathi Muthyam		
1986	Magadheerudu		
1986	Kaliyuga Pandavulu		
1987	Madana Gopaludu		
1987	Sankeertana		
1987	Punnami Chandrudu		
1987	Majnu		
1987	Ummadi Mogudu		
1987	Chakravarthy	Swamiji	
1987	Swayam Krushi		
1987	Viswanatha Nayakudu		
1988	Abhinandana		
1988	Bava Marudula Saval		
1988	Raktabhishekam		
1989	Swara Kalpana		
1989	Ayyappa Swamy Mahatyam		
1989	Neerajanam		
1989	Ashoka Chakravarthy	Vedam Venkataraya Sastry	
1990	Jayasimha	Mukunda Rao, DFO	
1990	Magaadu		
1991	Aditya 369	Mahamantri Thimmarusu	
1991	Sri Yedukondala Swamy		
1991	Tharaka Prabhuni Deeksha Mahimalu		
1991	Rowdy Alludu		
1992	Appula Appa Rao	Sankara Sastri	
1992	Karuninchina Kanakala Durga		
1992	Allari Mogudu		
1993	Aadarsham		
1993	Mutha Mestri	MLA Raghavayya	
1993	Anna Vadina		
1993	Kaliyugam		
1993	Adivaram Amavasya		
1994	Govinda Govinda	TTD Chief Priest	
1994	Bobbili Simham		
1994	Angarakshasudu		
1994	Sarigamalu		
1995	Khaidi Inspector	Sivaramakrishnaiah	
1995	Big Boss		
1996	Puttinti Gowravam		
1996	Sampradayam		
1996	Jabilamma Pelli		
1996	Dharma Chakram		
1996	Adhrindi Alludu		
1997	Super Heroes		
1997	Omkaram		
1998	Subbaraju Gari Kutumbam		
1998	Sambhavam		
1999	Chinni Chinni Aasa		
2000	Kodanda Ramudu		
2000	Adavi Chukka		
2001	Chinna		
2003	Indiramma		
2003	Kabirdas		

=== Tamil films ===
List of Tamil films and roles
Year	Title	Role(s)
1984	Neengal Kettavai	Music teacher
1985	Sri Raghavendrar	Saint Sudheendra
1985	Yaar?	Swamiji
1988	Idhu Namma Aalu	Srinivasa Sastry
1989	Thiruppu Munai	Sathyamoorthy
1990	Pagalil Pournami	Monk
1997	Mannava	Astrologer

=== Kannada films ===
List of Kannada films and roles
Year	Title	Role(s)
1983	Gandharvagiri	Narasimha Joshi
1988	Sri Venkateshwara Mahime	
1995	Mutthinantha Hendathi	
2003	Raktha Kanneeru	Chandhra's father
2003	Ondagona Baa	Raghavayya (Ajja)

=== Hindi films ===
List of films and roles
Year	Title	Role(s)
1984	Jaag Utha Insan	Panditji
1990	Pratibandh	Chief Minister Satyendra
2005	Bhagmati	

=== Malayalam films ===
List of Malayalam films and roles
Year	Title	Role(s)
1994	Sopanam	Raja Raja Varma Thamburan
1997	Itha Oru Snehagatha	Hema's Grandfather
2001	Naranathu Thampuran	Guruji

=== Television ===
- Lady Detective (1995)
- Abhay Charan as A.C. Bhaktivedanta Swami (1996)
- Nagamma as Rayudu (2002–2004)
