= Madugula Nagaphani Sarma =

Telugu literary performer

Dr. Brahmasri Madugula Nagaphani Sarma
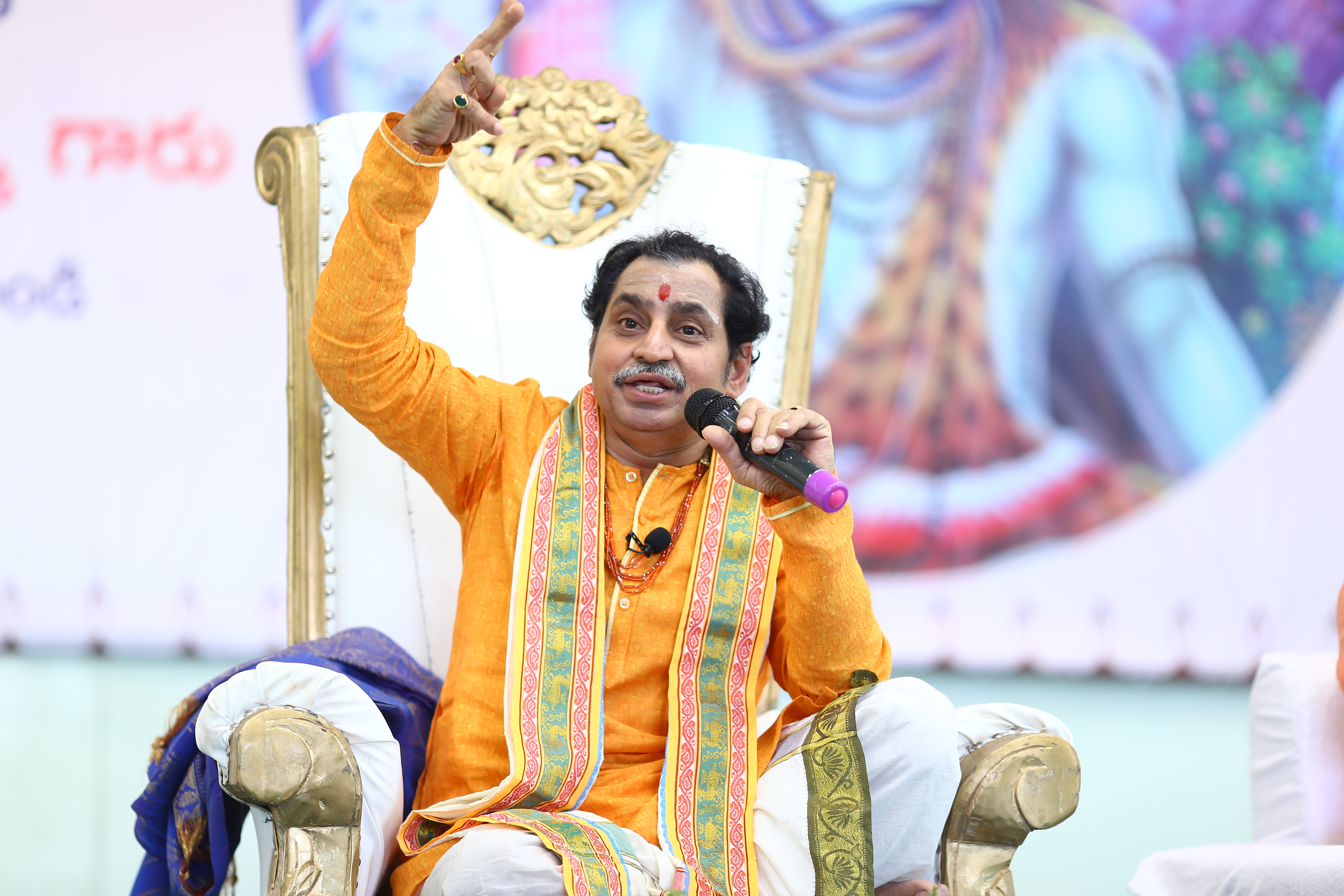
- Madugula Nagaphani Sarma
- Born: June 8, 1959 (age 67); Kadavakollu, Anantapur district, Andhra Pradesh, India
- Occupations: Sanskrit scholar, poet, avadhāni
- Known for: Revival and popularisation of Avadhanam
- Awards: Padma Shri (2025)

Madugula Nagaphani Sarma (born 8 June 1959) is an Indian Sanskrit and Telugu scholar, poet and avadhāni, widely known for reviving and popularising the classical literary performance art of Avadhanam. Over a career spanning more than five decades, he has performed over 2,000 avadhanams in India and abroad and authored numerous works in Sanskrit and Telugu.

== Early life and education ==
Madugula Nagaphani Sarma was born on 8 June 1959 in Kadavakollu village in Anantapur district, Andhra Pradesh, into a family of Vedic scholars. He was introduced to Sanskrit, Telugu literature and Vedic studies at an early age and performed his first avadhanam at the age of fourteen, gaining recognition as one of the youngest avadhānis in India.

He pursued higher education in Sanskrit and classical literature, obtaining Sahitya Shiromani from Sri Venkateswara University, Tirupati, followed by postgraduate studies and a doctorate (Ph.D.) in Sanskrit from Rashtriya Sanskrit Vidyapeeth.

== Career ==
=== Avadhanam ===
Avadhanam is a demanding literary performance art requiring simultaneous poetic composition, mastery of prosody, memory, logic and improvisation. Sarma played a significant role in revitalising the tradition by presenting avadhanams beyond conventional scholarly settings and introducing them to wider audiences across India and internationally.

He has performed more than 2,000 avadhanams and conducted rare large-scale performances such as Sahasravadhanam and Dwi-Sahasravadhanam, involving over a thousand scholars simultaneously, in both Sanskrit and Telugu.

=== Literary works and teaching ===
Sarma has authored more than forty books and composed tens of thousands of poems, devotional songs and verses in Sanskrit and Telugu. His works span poetry, philosophy, devotional literature and cultural commentary, including the Sanskrit mahākāvya Vishwabharatam.

He has delivered extensive lectures and discourses on Sanātana Dharma, Indian philosophy and classical literature and has mentored students in Sanskrit and avadhanam traditions.

=== Institutions and service ===
Sarma founded the Avadhana Saraswathi Peetham, an institution dedicated to the preservation and promotion of avadhanam and classical learning. The Peetham functions as a cultural and educational centre conducting workshops, performances and research activities.

== Awards and honours ==
In 2025, Madugula Nagaphani Sarma was conferred the Padma Shri by the Government of India for his contribution to literature and education, particularly for reviving the art of avadhanam.
