= Yoganand =

Yoganand is a given name and surname. Notable people with the name include:

- Yoganand Shastri (born 1944), Indian politician
- D. Yoganand (1922–2006), Indian film director.
- Vikram Yoganand (fl. 2009), Indian film director
