= Swayamkrushi =

1987 Telugu film directed by Kasinathuni Viswanath

Swayamkrushi స్వయం కృషి
- Directed by: K. Viswanath
- Screenplay by: K. Viswanath
- Story by: K. Viswanath
- Produced by: Edida Nageswara Rao
- Starring: Chiranjeevi; Vijayashanti; Sumalatha; Master Arjun; Charan Raj; Sarvadaman D. Banerjee; J. V. Somayajulu; Brahmanandam; M. V. S. Haranatha Rao; P. L. Narayana; S. K. Misro
- Cinematography: Lok Singh
- Edited by: G. G. Krishna Rao
- Music by: Ramesh Naidu
- Release date: 3 September 1987 (India)
- Country: India
- Language: Telugu

Swayamkrushi (transl. Self-made) is a 1987 Indian Telugu-language drama film written and directed by K. Viswanath. The film stars Chiranjeevi and Vijayashanti in main leads, with Sarvadaman D. Banerjee, and Sumalatha in other pivotal roles.

The film chronicles the life of a self-educated cobbler's journey from rags to riches. The film was screened at the International Film Festival of India, the Asia Pacific Film Festival; the film was dubbed into Russian and was screened at the special mention section at the Moscow International Film Festival. Chiranjeevi garnered the Indian Express Best Actor, and the Nandi Award for Best Actor award for his performance. Vijayashanti garnered the Filmfare Award for Best Actress for her performance in the film. It was dubbed into Hindi as Dharamyudh.

== Plot ==
Sambasiva Rao, widely known as Sambayya, is an uneducated but highly principled and industrious cobbler. Following the death of his sister due to spousal abuse, Sambayya takes sole custody of her infant son, Chinna. Ganga, a close friend, harbors deep feelings for Sambayya, though she is aware of his unspoken affection for his childhood friend, Sarada, whose higher education he financially sponsors. When Chinna’s biological father, Govind, is released from prison and attempts to abduct the infant, Sambayya intervenes and drives him away. With Ganga's logistical assistance, Sambayya secures a bank loan and successfully opens a modest footwear manufacturing shop.

Unaware of Sambayya’s romantic feelings, Sarada introduces him to her college mate, Bhaskar, and requests his blessing for their marriage. Sambayya willingly orchestrates their wedding despite his internal heartbreak. Fearing that a future wife of his own might mistreat Chinna upon having biological children, Sambayya reconsiders the idea of marriage entirely. To alleviate his concerns, Ganga undergoes a voluntary tubectomy to prove her singular devotion to Chinna's upbringing, after which Sambayya marries her. On their wedding day, a vengeful Govind burns down Sambayya's new shop, but Sambayya overpowers him and hands him over to the police.

Years pass, and Sambayya's modest footwear venture evolves into a highly successful, large-scale shoe manufacturing corporation. Despite their immense wealth, Sambayya and Ganga remain humble and grounded. However, Chinna grows up to be arrogant, frequently boasting about his adoptive father's wealth. Concurrently, Sarada and Bhaskar's marriage deteriorates due to Bhaskar's unemployment and chronic vices. When Bhaskar attempts to solicit funds from Sambayya, Sarada refuses to exploit his generosity and separates from her husband. Upon learning of her plight, Sambayya provides Sarada with shelter at his home and employs her at his company.

Govind returns after serving his prison sentence and seeks retribution. He manipulates an unemployed Bhaskar, baselessly accusing Sambayya of sheltering Sarada with illicit motives. After Bhaskar publicly accuses Sambayya and Sarada of having an affair, Sambayya privately confronts Bhaskar, making him realize his error. Remorseful, Bhaskar accepts a entry-level job at Sambayya’s firm and reconciles with Sarada.

Meanwhile, Govind allies with Ganga's unscrupulous father to gain proximity to Chinna. When an arrogant Chinna verbally abuses a household servant for improperly polishing his shoes, Sambayya punishes him by forcing him to work as a roadside cobbler after school hours until he earns enough money to replace the servant's ruined clothing. Exploiting the boy's resentment, Govind approaches Chinna, reveals his true biological parentage, and systematically poisons his mind against Sambayya. Govind subsequently files for legal custody of Chinna. Influenced by his biological father, Chinna chooses to live with Govind, leaving Sambayya and Ganga devastated.

Govind gradually exposes Chinna to various urban vices to ensure his compliance. He later approaches Ganga with evidence of the boy's moral decline, demanding the legal ownership of Sambayya's footwear factories and properties in exchange for Chinna's future well-being. Sambayya and Ganga unhesitatingly sign over all their corporate assets to Govind, who promptly evicts Chinna from his house once the transaction is complete. At a social gathering, Sarada exposes Govind’s manipulation to Chinna, explaining how Sambayya sacrificed his entire corporate empire just to protect him, though a stubborn Chinna remains skeptical.

Meanwhile, Sarada and Bhaskar mobilize the factory workers to stage a mass revolt, successfully ousting Govind from the company. Ruined and physically beaten by the laborers, a defeated Govind begs Sambayya for forgiveness and offers to return the corporate assets. Disillusioned by the corruption that wealth brought to his family, Sambayya declines the properties. He and Ganga vacate their mansion to return to their original roadside cobbling profession. While working under a tree, Sambayya and Ganga look across the street and witness a reformed Chinna earning a humble living through manual labor. Recognizing that he has finally learned the value of hard work and humility, the family experiences an emotional reunion.

== Cast ==
- Chiranjeevi as Sambasiva Rao aka Sambayya
- Vijayashanti as Ganga
- Sumalatha as Sarada
  - Baby Bhavana as young Sarada
- Master Arjun as Chinna
- Charan Raj as Govind
- Sarvadaman Banerjee as Bhaskar
- J.V. Somayajulu as Sambayya's teacher
- Brahmanandam
- M. V. S. Haranatha Rao
- P. L. Narayana
- S. K. Misro as a cobbler cum Sambayya's manager
- Dubbing Janaki as Sarada's grandmother
- Samyuktha
- Master Suresh

== Soundtrack ==
Soundtrack composed by Ramesh Naidu was released through Lahari Music label. Lyrics were written by C. Narayana Reddy and Sirivennela Seetharama Sastry while a song written by Kshetrayya was also used in this film.

Track list
| No. | Title | Lyrics | Singer(s) | Length |
|---|---|---|---|---|
| 1. | "Paaraahushaar" | Sirivennela Seetharama Sastry | S. P. Balasubrahmanyam, S. Janaki | 6:00 |
| 2. | "Sinnii Sinnii Korikaladagaa" | Sirivennela Seetharama Sastry | S. Janaki | 4:37 |
| 3. | "Hello Hello Darling" | Sirivennela Seetharama Sastry | S. P. Balasubrahmanyam, S. Janaki | 5:00 |
| 4. | "Siggoo Poobanti" | Sirivennela Seetharama Sastry | S. P. Balasubrahmanyam, S. Janaki, S. P. Sailaja | 4:42 |
| 5. | "Manchi Vennela Ippudu" | Kshetrayya | S. P. Sailaja | 4:29 |
| 6. | "Kaamudu Kaamudu" | C. Narayana Reddy | S. P. Balasubrahmanyam, S. Janaki & Chorus | 7:20 |
| Total length: | | | | 32:08 |

== Awards ==
- Cinema Express Best Actor - Chiranjeevi
- Nandi Award for Best Actor - Chiranjeevi
- Filmfare Award for Best Actress - Telugu - Vijayashanti
