= M. V. Raghu =

Indian cinematographer

- Born: 5 October 1954 (age 72); Bhimavaram, West Godavari District, Andhra Pradesh, India
- Occupations: Cinematographer; Director; Producer; Writer; Film Academician
- Notable work: Kallu
- Spouse: Lakshmi
- Children: 2

M. V. Raghu (born 5 October 1954) is an Indian film cinematographer turned director, screenwriter, and producer known for his works predominantly in Telugu cinema. He is mainly known for his collaborations with K. Vishwanath and Vamsy.

In 1988, he has directed the neo-realistic film Kallu, which has received many awards including state awards and has garnered special mention from the CBFC Jury. Jury Member for Nandi Film Awards 2001 and 2017. Also Known As "Kallu Raghu" in Telugu Film Industry

== Education ==
After completing B.Sc. degree from SRR & CVR Govt. Degree College, Vijayawada. He Joined Govt. College Of Fine Arts and Graduated in Diploma in Photography

== Career ==
Kallu (transl. Eyes) is a 1988 Indian Telugu-language drama film directed by M. V. Raghu. Adapted from a play of the same name by Gollapudi Maruti Rao, the film follows the lives and experiences of five blind people.

He assisted for many films in Vijaya Vauhini Studios, Chennai in 1975. During that period, he worked as a camera and focus assistant for Marcus Bartley, P. L. Rai,M. A. Rehman,G. K. Ramu, Maruthi Rao, P. S.Selvaraj, Babu Bhai Mistry, Ravikanth Nagaich, Malli Irani, K. S. Prasad, A. Vincent, P. N. Sundaram, Ramachandra Babu, Ashok Kumar, and Balu Mahendra.

== Filmography ==
Cinematography

Year	Film	Notes
1983	Maga Maharaju	
1983	Vimukthikosam	
1984	Kotha Dampathulu	
1984	Sitaara	
1984	Mahanagaramlo Mayagadu	
1984	Tella Gulabilu	
1984	Yeduruleni Monagallu	
1984	Bharyamani	
1985	Dongallo Dora	
1985	Anveshana	
1985	Kongu Mudi	
1985	America Alludu	
1985	Preminchu Pelladu	
1986	Swathi Muthyam	
1986	Sirivennela	Nandi Award for Best Cinematography
1986	Aalaapana	
1986	Brahma Rudrulu	
1986	Guru Brahma	
1987	Sansar	Hindi film
1988	Premayanam	
1988	Raga Lila	
1988	Hush Gup Chup	
1988	Nyaniki Shiksha	
1988	Indra Dhanassu	
1988	Kallu	Debut Director, Screened in Delhi IFFI 1989 Official Category Filmfare, Best Director Award (Telugu); Nandi Award- Best Debut Director; Nandi Award – Third Best Film
1988	Angni Keratalu	
1988	O Bharya Kadha	
1989	Artha Nadam	
1990	Neti Dourjanyam	
1990	Mera Pati Sirf Mera Hai	Hindi film
1991	April 1 Vidudala	
1992	Detective Narada	
1993	Chittemma Mogudu	
1994	Palnati Pourusham	
1996	Soggadi Pellam	
1997	Collector Garu	
1998	Khaidi Garu	
1998	Raayudu	
1998	W/o V. Vara Prasad	
1999	Film Nagar	
2000	Uncle	
2000	Srimathi	Kannada Film
2002	Vachina Vaadu Suryudu	
2003	Golmaal	
2004	Deeksha (2004 film )	
2004	Konchem Touchlo Vunte Cheputanu	
2007	Bhajantrilu	
2008	Somberi	
2011	Koffi Bar	
2011	Kshetram	
2014	Vennello Hai Hai	
2017	Latchi	
2019	Screenplay	

Director and screenwriter

Year	Film	Director	Screenplay	Notes
1988	Kallu	Yes	Yes	
1989	Artha Nadam	Yes	Yes	
2004	Deeksha	No	Yes	

Short films

Year	Film	Notes
2015	Colour Of Darkness	World Shortest Film
2015	Prerana	
2015	Pallaki	
2017	Amma Korika	

Documentary films

Year	Film	Director	Channel	Notes	Awards
1999	100 Rare Arts Of Andhrapradesh			Produced By Dept. of Culture	
2000	Hidden Tresures	Arnie Shirin	Discovery		
	A Man Of Cinema	KNT Shastri		Life Of LV Prasad	
	Harvesting Girl Child	KNT Shastri			
	Surabhi- The Stage	KNT Shastri		Surabhi Theatre	National And State Award Winning Anthrology
	Making oF Haleem- Pista House	KNT Shastri			
	Can I Go To School	Rama Krishna		Doc On AIDS	
2005	lion Club International 324 C5	MV Raghu			

Television works

Year	Film	Language	Channel	Notes
	Srinivasa Kalyanam	Kannada	ETV Production	
	Prema Kathegalu	Kannada	ETV Production	
	Vyuha	Kannada	ETV Production	

As Operative cameraman

Year	Film
1980	Gopala Rao Gari Ammayi
1980	Gutlloni Rama Chilaka
1980	Samsara Bhandam
1981	Pakkinti Ammayi
1981	Dabbu Dabbu Dabbu
1981	Je Ghantalu
1981	Mudda Mandaram
1982	Malle Pandiri
1982	Nalugu Sthambalata
1982	Jaggu
1983	Nelavanka
1983	Rendu Jella Sita

As Assistant cameraman

Year	Film
1976	Bhaktha Kannappa
1976	Siri Siri Muvva
1977	Ramvha Urvasi Menaka
1977	Yedureetha
1977	Jeevana Thiralu
1977	Maa Iddari Katha
1977	Amara Deepam
1978	Vichitra Jivitham
1978	Rama Krishnulu
1978	Kaliyuga Street
1978	Kumar Raaja
1979	Bangaru Chellelu
1979	Kotha Alludu
1980	Sivamethina Satyam
1980	Sita Ramulu
1981	Puli Bidda

== Awards ==
Year	Organization	Film	Notes
1986	Nandi Award Special Jury	Sirivennela	Cinematography
1989	Nandi Award for Third Best Feature Film	Kallu	Bronzee
1989	Nandi Award for Best First Film of a Director	Kallu	Debut Director
1989	Filmfare Award for Telugu	Kallu	Best Director
