= Eeshwar (1989 film) =

- Poster
- Directed by: K. Vishwanath
- Written by: K. Vishwanath; Dr. Achla Nagar
- Based on: Swati Mutyam
- Produced by: P. Mallikharjuna Rao
- Starring: Anil Kapoor; Vijayshanti; Saeed Jaffrey
- Cinematography: V. Durga Prasad
- Edited by: G. G. Krishna Rao
- Music by: Laxmikant–Pyarelal
- Production company: Bharati International Films
- Release date: 24 February 1989
- Running time: 145 min
- Country: India
- Language: Hindi

Eeshwar is a 1989 Bollywood film written, and directed by K. Vishwanath. The film stars Anil Kapoor, Vijayashanti. It is the Hindi version of Viswanath's Telugu cult classic Swathi Muthyam. The film received the Filmfare Award for Best Story.

== Cast ==
- Anil Kapoor as Ishwarchand Vishnuchand Brahmanand Verma 'Ishwar'
- Vijayashanti as Lalita (voice dubbed by Reema Lagoo)
- Shammi as Ishwar's grandmother
- Saeed Jaffrey as Masterji (Guest Appearance)
- Asha Sachdev as the Village Washerwoman
- Sadashiv Amrapurkar as Tolaram
- Vinod Mehra as Ramesh (Lalita's Brother)
- Bharati Achrekar as Ramesh's Wife & Lalita's Sister-In-Law
- Sukanya Kulkarni as Tolaram, Sister in law
- Vikram Gokhale as Chaudhary Lalita's father-in-law (father of her first husband)
- Jayshree Gadkar as Rajeshswari Chaudhary Lalita's mother -in-law (Mother of her first husband)
- Gulshan Grover as Natwarlal
- Shama Deshpande as Rani, Housemaid of eeshwar
- Rakesh Pandey as Balkrishna (Balu), as son of Eeshwar
- Agha as Tolaram's Father in Law
- Shreechand Makhija as Servant of Chaudhary
- Birbal as Chandu
- Rasik Dave as son of eeshwar

== Soundtrack ==
| # | Title | Singer(s) |
|---|---|---|
| 1 | "Kaushalya Main Teri" | Nitin Mukesh, Kavita Krishnamurthy |
| 2 | "Aage Sukh To Peeche Dukh Hai" | Nitin Mukesh, Kavita Krishnamurthy |
| 3 | "Ramji Ne Dhanush Toda" | Suresh Wadkar, Nitin Mukesh, Kavita Krishnamurthy |
| 4 | "Dharmam Sharnam Gachhami" | Nitin Mukesh, Alka Yagnik |
| 5 | "Baj Utha Saanson Mein" | Nitin Mukesh, Kavita Krishnamurthy |

== Awards ==
35th Filmfare Awards:

Won

- Best Story – K. Viswanath

Nominated

- Best Actor – Anil Kapoor
- Best Actress – Vijayashanti
