= Dubbing Janaki =

Indian film and television actress

- Born: Dasari Janaki; Peddapuram, India
- Occupations: Actress, voice artist
- Years active: 1958–present
- Known for: Hosa Belaku; Sagara Sangamam; Geethanjali; Swati Mutyam

Dasari Janaki, known professionally as Dubbing Janaki, is an Indian actress and voice artist. She has appeared in several films and television shows in various South Indian languages.

== Early life ==
Janaki was born in Peddapuram, East Godavari District, Andhra Pradesh. She started acting in stage shows from the age of 9. She studied up to 7th standard. Though her birthname is Dasari Janaki, she was called Dubbing Janaki by the media to distinguish her from her contemporaries, actress Sowcar Janaki and singer S. Janaki.

== Career ==
She started appearing in films in 1958. Her first film was Bhookailas produced by A. V. Meiyappan. She dubbed for the role of Kasturba in the Telugu 'ndhi. She played an important character in the film Sankarabharanam (1980) in which she played a maid. After that, she started getting similar roles. She is also remembered for her mother roles in films Sagara Sangamam (1983) and Swati Kiranam.
