= Kallu (film) =

- Directed by: M. V. Raghu
- Written by: Sirivennela Sitaramasastri (lyrics)
- Screenplay by: M. V. Raghu
- Story by: Gollapudi Maruti Rao
- Produced by: D. Vijaya Kumar; A. L. Ananda Rao
- Starring: Sivaji Raja; Chidambaram; Gundu Hanumantha Rao; N. J Bhikshu; Rajeswari
- Cinematography: M. V. Raghu
- Edited by: M. V. Raghu
- Music by: SP Balasubramanyam
- Production company: Mahashakthi Films
- Release date: 1988
- Running time: 132 min
- Country: India
- Language: Telugu

Kallu (transl. Eyes) is a 1988 Indian Telugu-Language ethnographic drama film based on the lives of five blind people directed by M. V. Raghu, based on Gollapudi Maruti Rao's play with the same name. In 2018, the film celebrated its 30th anniversary by "Mukhi Media" in Hyderabad.

The film won four state Nandi Awards, and the Filmfare Award for Best Direction. It was screened in Indian panorama section of the International Film Festival of India, and the Hyderabad Film Festival. The film won thirty awards including special mention from the CBFC Jury.

== Cast ==
- Sivaji Raja as Rangadu
- Chidambaram
- Gundu Hanumantha Rao
- N. J Bhikshu
- Rajeswari
- SP Balasubramanyam (cameo)
- Bhaskar Rao
- Sripada Somayajulu
- Kallu Krishna Rao
- Raghunantha Reddy

== Awards ==
Nandi Awards - 1988

- Third Best Feature Film - Bronze - D. Vijaya Kumar & A. L. Ananda Rao
- Best First Film of a Director - M. V. Raghu
- Best Story Writer - Gollapudi Maruthi Rao
- Special Jury Award - Kallu Chidambaram

Filmfare Awards South

- Filmfare Award for Best Director – Telugu - M. V. Raghu
