= Subhalekha Sudhakar filmography =

The following is the filmography for Indian actor Subhalekha Sudhakar.

== Filmography ==
=== Telugu films ===
Partial list of Subhalekha Sudhakar Telugu film credits
Year	Title	Role	Notes	Ref.
1982	Subhalekha	Murali Mohan		
1983	Rendu Jella Sita	Kameswara rao		
1983	Mantri Gari Viyyankudu	Siva		
1984	Janani Janmabhoomi	Suresh		
1984	Srimathi Kaavali			
1984	Ravoo Gopala Ravoo			
1984	Sitaara	Devadas		
1984	Swati	Kapil Dev		
1985	Sravanthi			
1985	Preminchu Pelladu	Babji		
1985	Mogudu Pellalu			
1985	Bangaru Chilaka	Chanti Babu		
1985	Aalaya Deepam			
1985	Anveshana	Chantigadu		
1985	Puli	Gopi		
1986	Ladies Tailor	Sitaramudu		
1986	Sita Rama Kalyanam	Maruti		
1986	Dora Bidda			
1986	Chadastapu Mogudu			
1986	Sravana Meghalu			
1986	Sirivennela	Suri Babu		
1986	Muddula Manavaralu			
1986	Kashmora	Shadow		
1986	Captain Nagarjun	Murthy		
1987	Gowthami			
1987	Akshintalu			
1987	Gundamma Gari Krishnulu	Gopal Krishna		
1987	Bhale Mogudu	Babji		
1987	Manmadha Leela Kamaraju Gola	Anji Babu		
1987	Raga Leela			
1987	Aha Naa Pellanta	Kukuteshwararao		
1987	Ajeyudu	Vishnu		
1987	Collector Gari Abbai	Satya		
1987	Srinivasa Kalyanam	Rajesh		
1988	Chinababu	Satyam		
1988	Bazaar Rowdy	Mohan		
1988	Vivaha Bhojanambu	Kailasam		
1988	Intinti Bhagavatam			
1988	Aatmakatha			
1988	Maa Inti Maharaju			
1988	Thodallullu	LIC Agent Sudhakar		
1988	Maharajasri Mayagadu			
1988	Nava Bharatham			
1988	Chuttalabbayi	Rambabu		
1988	Jhansi Rani (1988 film)	Chanti		
1989	Muddula Mavayya			
1989	Ashoka Chakravarthy	Johnson		
1989	Siva	Mallik		
1989	Praja Theerpu			
1989	Mamathala Kovela			
1989	Bandhuvulostunnaru Jagratha	Sudhakar		
1990	Alajadi			
1990	Manasu Mamatha			
1990	Doshi Nirdoshi			
1990	Prema Zindabad			
1990	Irugillu Porugillu			
1990	Neti Charitra	Rambabu		
1990	Chevilo Puvvu	Sattibabu		
1991	Kalikalam	Sudhakar		
1991	Nirnayam	Shankar		
1991	Manishi			
1991	Chitram Bhalare Vichitram	Sudhakar		
1991	Aditya 369			
1991	Pelli Pustakam			
1992	Subba Rayudi Pelli			
1992	Mogudu Pellala Dongata			
1992	Parvathalu Panakalu			
1992	420			
1992	Repati Koduku			
1992	Brundavanam	Bala Raju		
1993	Bhagat			
1993	Manavarali Pelli	Acchi Babu		
1993	Jeevana Vedam			
1993	Vintha Kodallu			
1993	Jeevithame Oka Cinema			
1993	Ladies Special			
1993	Ish Gup Chup			
1994	Bhairava Dweepam			
1994	Neeku 16 Naaku 18			
1994	Madam	Bobby		
1995	Sisindri	Johnny		
1995	Premaku Padi Sutralu			
1995	Nirantharam			
1995	Ketu Duplicate	Sudhakar		
1996	Sri Krishnarjuna Vijayam			
1996	Drohi			
1996	Pavitra Bandham	Shankar		
1997	Dongaata	Prasad		
1997	Pelli Chesukundam	Shiva		
1997	Thoka Leni Pitta			
1997	Chinnabbayi	Sudhakar		
1998	Eshwar Alla			
1999	Chinni Chinni Aasa	Kailash		
2004	Aa Naluguru	Subrahmanyam		
2005	Modati Cinema			
2006	Seethakoka Chiluka			
2010	Rakta Charitra		Simultaneously shot in Hindi as Rakt Charitra	
2010	Rakta Charitra 2		Simultaneously shot in Hindi as Rakt Charitra 2	
2011	Bezawada	Sagar Raju		
2012	Dammu			
2012	Genius			
2013	Priyathama Neevachata Kushalama			
2014	Oka Laila Kosam	College President		
2015	Bandipotu	Satyanarayana		
2016	Brahmotsavam	Kasi’s father		
2017	Gautamiputra Satakarni	Satakarni’s messenger		
2017	Patel S. I. R.	Rao		
2017	Middle Class Abbayi	Srinivas		
2018	Srinivasa Kalyanam	Minister		
2018	Aravinda Sametha Veera Raghava	Sudarshan Reddy		
2018	Amar Akbar Anthony	Dr. Marc Anthony		
2019	N.T.R: Kathanayakudu	P. Pullayya		
2019	ABCD: American Born Confused Desi	Barghav’s father		
2020	Entha Manchivaadavuraa	Shiva Rao		
2020	Bheeshma	Ramaraju		
2020	Johaar	Bose		
2021	30 Rojullo Preminchadam Ela	Swamiji		
2021	Jathi Ratnalu	Subash K. Chandra		
2021	Vakeel Saab	Flat Owner		
2021	Ardha Shathabdham			
2021	Pachchis	Gangadhar		
2021	Natyam			
2021	Ram Asur	Ramachari		
2021	Shyam Singha Roy	Judge J. Satyendra		
2022	The American Dream			
2022	Pakka Commercial	Judge		
2022	Macherla Niyojakavargam	Raghavaiah		
2022	Like, Share & Subscribe	Home Minister		
2022	Masooda	Rizwan (Baba)		
2022	Anukoni Prayanam			
2023	Vinaro Bhagyamu Vishnu Katha	Vishnu’s grandfather		
2023	Chakravyuham:The Trap	Siri's Grandfather		
2023	Ramabanam			
2023	Hidimba	Chief Minister		
2023	Rangabali	Shivayya		
2023	Bhagavanth Kesari	Deputy chief minister		
2023	Badmash Gallaki Bumper Offer	Purushottam		
2024	RAM (Rapid Action Mission)			
2024	Game On	Gowtham's Grand Father		
2024	Yatra 2	Reddy		
2024	Chaari 111	Ex-CM Vijay Reddy		
2024	Bhimaa	Bhimaa's grandfather		
2024	Mr. Bachchan			
2024	Saripodhaa Sanivaaram	Constable Kamalakar		
2024	C 202			
2025	Neeli Megha Shyama	Megha's grand father		
2025	Game Changer	Party Senior		
2025	Thalli Manasu	Raghavrao		
2025	Court	Muthyalayya		
2025	Robinhood	Murthy		
2025	Mad Square	Subhalekha Sudhakar		
2025	Oka Brundavanam	Joseph Rathnam		
2025	Shashtipoorthi			
2025	Sri Sri Sri Raja Vaaru	MLA		
2025	Uppu Kappurambu	Subbaraju		
2025	Police Vaari Hecharika			
2025	They Call Him OG	Dharani		
2025	Ari: My Name is Nobody	Gunjan		
2026	Sahakutumbaanaam	Dr. Venugopal		
2026	Nilakanta			
2026	Gaayapadda Simham	Vijay Kanth		
2026	Jetlee	Harish Chandra		

=== Tamil films ===
List of Subhalekha Sudhakar Tamil film credits
Year	Title	Role	Ref.
1994	Duet	Co-musician	
1995	Kuruthipunal	Soori	
1997	Nesam	Vaitheeshwara Moorthy	
1997	Ratchagan	Sathish Varma	
2003	Priyamana Thozhi	Nandini's father	
2003	Uyirosai	Somasundaram	
2008	Kamasutra Nights	Bharathan	
2009	Ayan	Film Producer	
2009	Mariyadhai	Radha's father	
2013	Thiru Pugazh		
2021	Iruvar Ullam	Sambhavi's father	

=== Hindi film ===
List of Subhalekha Sudhakar Hindi film credits
Year	Title	Role	Notes
1983	Shubh Kaamna	Viji's lover	credited as Sudhakar

=== Notable films as dubbing artist ===
Actor	Film	Language
Anant Nag	K.G.F: Chapter 1	Telugu (dubbed)
Anant Nag	Bheeshma	Telugu
Hareesh Peradi	Adirindhi	Telugu (dubbed)
Jayaprakash	Naa Peru Siva	Telugu (dubbed)
Jayaprakash	Gambler	Telugu (dubbed)
Jayaprakash	Tej I Love You	Telugu
Jayaprakash	Touch Chesi Chudu	Telugu
Jayaprakash	World Famous Lover	Telugu
Jayaprakash	Tuck Jagadish	Telugu
Karan	Suswagatham	Telugu
Lal	Saaho	Telugu
Madhusudhan Rao	Yuddham Sharanam	Telugu
Napoleon	Sulthan	Telugu (dubbed)
Nassar	Shakuni	Telugu (dubbed)
Nassar	Yamudu (film series)	Telugu (dubbed)
Nassar	Thalaivii	Telugu (dubbed)
Ramesh Khanna	Thenali	Telugu (dubbed)
Sachin Khedekar	Ala Vaikunthapurramuloo	Telugu
Sachin Khedekar	Indrajith	Tamil
Sachin Khedekar	Brothers	Telugu (dubbed)
Sachin Khedekar	Veera Simha Reddy	Telugu
Sachin Khedekar	Mr. Bachchan	Telugu
Sachin Khedekar	Dhamaka	Telugu
Sanjay Swaroop	Ye Maaya Chesave	Telugu
Shatrughan Sinha	Rakta Charitra 1 & 2	Telugu
Narrator (Trailer Only)	Aswathama	Telugu
Vijay (Ganapathi)	Padamati Sandhya Ragam	Telugu
Thalaivasal Vijay	Dhoni	Telugu
Thalaivasal Vijay	Aakasamantha	Telugu (dubbed)
Samuthirakani	Dongalunnaru Jaagratha	Telugu

== Television ==
Year	Title	Role	Language	Network
1995–1996	Cinema Quiz	Host	Telugu	ETV Telugu
1997	Pelli Pandiri	Venkayya Naidu	Telugu	ETV Telugu
1997–1998	Marmadesam - Ragasiyam	Agniraasu	Tamil	Sun TV
1998–2001	Idi Katha Kaadu	Subramanyam	Telugu	ETV Telugu
1999–2000	Marmadesam - Iyanthira Paravai	Kumaraswamy	Tamil	Sun TV
1999–2001	Chithi	Krishna / Kannan	Tamil	Sun TV
1999–2002	Anantharamanin Thirumanam	Sethuraman	Tamil	Sun TV
2000–2001	Marmadesam - Ethuvum Nadakkum	Rangachari	Tamil	Sun TV
2001–2003	Anni	Ramanathan	Tamil	Jaya TV
2001	Srimathi	Jayaram and Balaram	Telugu	Gemini TV
2002–2003	Penn	Manikkam	Sun TV	Tamil
2002–2003	Gayatri	Mohan Krishna	Telugu	Gemini TV
2002–2004	Alai Osai	Ramalingam	Tamil	Sun TV
2003–2004	Raju Gaari Kuthurulu	Raju	Telugu	Gemini TV
2003–2005	Kolangal	Narayanan	Tamil	Sun TV
2005–2006	Selvangal	Vaitheeshwara Murthy	Tamil	Sun TV
2005–2006	Karthavyam	Viswanath	Telugu	Gemini TV
2006	Penn	Muthukumar	Tamil	Sun TV
2006	Raja Rajeshwari	Ayya	Tamil	Sun TV
2006–2007	Anjali	Sundaram	Tamil	Sun TV
2007–2010	Ammayi Kaapuram	Raghunath	Telugu	Gemini TV
2008	Simran Thirai	Varadharajan	Tamil	Jaya TV
2008–2009	Anandham Vilayadum Veedu	Nallasivam	Tamil	Kalaignar TV
2009–2015	Thendral	Muthumanikkam	Tamil	Sun TV
2009–2011	Madhavi	Krishnamurthy	Tamil	Sun TV
2009–2010	Bhavani	Thyagarajan	Tamil	Kalaignar TV
2012–2014	Ilavarasi	Mohan Sharma	Tamil	Sun TV
2012–2014	Mamathala Kovela	Satya Narayana Murthy	Telugu	Gemini TV
2011–2013	Manasu Mamatha	Koteshwar Rao	Telugu	ETV Telugu
2012–2013	Anubhandalu	Sathya Murthy	Telugu	Gemini TV
2013–2014	Mamiyar Thevai	Sundarapandi	Tamil	Zee Tamil
2015–2017	Nandini vs Nandini	Harischandra prasad	Telugu	ETV Plus
2015–2019	Priyamanaval	Krishnan	Tamil	Sun TV
2019	Kanulu Moosina Neevaye	Kailasanadha Sastry	Telugu	Star Maa
2020	Chitti Talli	Postmaster	Telugu	Star Maa
2020–2021	Amma	Suryanarayana	Telugu	ETV
2021	Chaitram	Ram Murthy	Telugu	ETV Life
