= Saptapadi (disambiguation) =

Saptapadi (lit. 'seven steps') is a ritual in a Hindu marriage.

Saptapadi may also refer to:

- Saptapadi (1961 film), an Indian Bengali-language film by Ajoy Kar
- Saptapadi (1981 film), an Indian Telugu-language film by K. Vishwanath
- Saptapadi (1992 film), an Indian Kannada-language film by Bhargava

== See also ==
- Parinayam (disambiguation), another term for the ritual
- Saat phere, a related Hindu marriage ritual
- Saat Phere – Saloni Ka Safar, an Indian drama television series
- Saat Phere (film), a 1970 Indian Hindi-language film by Sundar Dhar
- Ashtapadi (lit. 'eights foots/steps'), Sanskrit hymns of the poem Gita Govinda by Jayadeva in the 12th century
- Ashtapadi (film), a 1983 Indian Malayalam-language film by Ambili and written by Perumbadavam Sreedharan
- Ashtapad Mount or Mount Kailash
- Ashtapada, ancient Indian board game refused to be played by The Buddha
