= Moondru Mudichu =

1976 film by K. Balachander

- Poster
- Directed by: K. Balachander
- Screenplay by: K. Balachander
- Based on: O Seeta Katha by K. Viswanath
- Produced by: R. Venkataraman
- Starring: Kamal Haasan; Sridevi; Rajinikanth
- Cinematography: B. S. Lokanath
- Edited by: N. R. Kittu
- Music by: M. S. Viswanathan
- Production company: RMS Productions
- Release date: 22 October 1976
- Country: India
- Language: Tamil
- Budget: ₹10 lakh

Moondru Mudichu (transl. The three knots) is a 1976 Indian Tamil-language romantic thriller film directed and co-written by K. Balachander. A remake of the Telugu film O Seeta Katha (1974), it stars Kamal Haasan, Sridevi and Rajinikanth. The film revolves around an 18-year-old girl and two roommates who fall in love with her.

Moondru Mudichu marked Sridevi's first leading adult role, and Rajinikanth's first major role in Tamil. It was released on 22 October 1976 and became a success.

== Plot ==
Balaji and Prasath are roommates in Chennai. Balaji falls in love with 18-year-old Selvi, who lives in the same apartment complex. Prasath, who has his eyes on Selvi, pretends to back Balaji's love while secretly hoping to create a divide between them. Selvi realizes Prasath's intentions when she finds out that he has seduced Menaka, an innocent girl living in the same apartment complex. However, she is unable to convince Balaji, who hero-worships Prasath.

Things come to a head when Selvi, Balaji, and Prasath go for a picnic by the lake. Balaji falls into the lake by accident. Prasath refuses to jump in and save Balaji, on the pretext that he does not know how to swim. A devastated Selvi returns home to another shock: her sister, who plays small roles in films, has been in a fire accident which has left her face permanently scarred. Overnight, Selvi's life undergoes a change.

Selvi comes across an advertisement in the paper for a second marriage to Viswanathan, a wealthy man in Salem with four children, and applies for the same. However, Viswanathan refuses to marry a young girl like Selvi and asks her to take care of the children instead. Impressed by her service, he requests her to marry his eldest son, who turns out to be none other than Prasath, who visits his father during the weekend.

Prasath continues to harass Selvi and orders her to marry him. He gives her a week to decide and returns to Chennai. In an attempt to salvage her life, Selvi successfully persuades Viswanathan to marry her before Prasath returns the next weekend. This puts Prasath in an uncomfortable situation, as Selvi taunts him back using her 'mother' status. Meanwhile, Selvi spots Menaka, who has given birth to Prasath's child, brings them home, and tries to convince Prasath to marry her, but he rejects them.

Viswanathan accidentally finds out about the prior relationship between Prasath and Selvi and enacts an accident to make Prasath agree to his immoral past. Prasath repents for his mistakes and agrees to marry Menaka.

== Cast ==
- Kamal Haasan as Balaji
- Sridevi as Selvi
- Rajinikanth as Prasath
- Y. Vijaya as Subhadra
- N. Viswanath as Viswanathan, Prasath's father
- Krishna Rao as a servant
- K. Natraj as Prasath's conscience
- Sivachandran as a stage poet
- Baby Rani as Prasath's sister

== Production ==
Moondru Mudichu is a remake of the 1974 Telugu film O Seeta Katha. Jayabharathi was offered to play a negative role but did not accept, resulting in Rajinikanth being cast. It was Rajinikanth's first major role in Tamil. Kamal Haasan, who portrayed a negative role in O Seeta Katha's Malayalam remake Mattoru Seetha (1975), played a different role this time. It was initially planned for a newcomer as the lead actress before Sridevi was finalised as none of the newcomers satisfied during auditions. This was the first film where Sridevi played an adult character. She was paid ₹5000, Haasan was paid ₹30,000 and Rajinikanth was paid ₹2000. The budget of the film was ₹10 lakh (equivalent to ₹3.3 crore or US$340,000 in 2026). The filming was held at Bengaluru.

== Soundtrack ==
The soundtrack was composed by M. S. Viswanathan and lyrics were by Kannadasan.

Track listing
| No. | Title | Singer(s) | Length |
|---|---|---|---|
| 1. | "Aadi Velli" | P. Jayachandran, Vani Jairam | 3:46 |
| 2. | "Naanoru Kadhanayagi" | P. Susheela, L. R. Eswari | 3:07 |
| 3. | "Vasantha Kaala" | P. Jayachandran, Vani Jairam, M. S. Viswanathan | 3:20 |
| Total length: | | | 10:13 |

== Release and reception ==
Moondru Mudichu was released on 22 October 1976, Diwali day. Kanthan of Kalki appreciated the film for its cast performances, and called the pre-interval portions better than the post-interval ones. The Hindu lauded Rajinikanth for performing an "unsympathetic yet challenging role with style and fineness".

== Legacy ==
The film became a success, and many of Prasath's traits became signature moves of Rajinikanth in his future films, such as his tendency to flip cigarettes into his mouth. Critic Naman Ramachandran felt that with Prasath's recurring Hindi catchphrase "Teek Hai?" (transl. Okay?), "the seed for future Rajini catchphrases had been sown."

== Bibliography ==
- Ramachandran, Naman (2014) [2012]. Rajinikanth: The Definitive Biography. New Delhi: Penguin Books. ISBN 978-0-14-342111-5.
