= Game On =

Game On may refer to:

== Film and television ==
- Game On (2002 game show), an American game show
- Game On! (2020 game show), an American game show
- Game On (British TV series), a 1995–1998 sitcom
- Game On (Canadian game show), a 1998–2000 game show
- Game On (Canadian TV series), a 2015 comedy series
- Game: On, a 2004 live action and machinima short film for Volvo Cars
- "Game On", a 2010 promotional music video for the web series The Guild
- Game On, a 2016 YouTube video series by Tom Scott
- Game On, a 2024 Taiwanese television film series starring George Hu and Amanda Chou
- Game On (film), a 2024 Indian Telugu-language film

=== Television episodes ===
- "Game On" (Aaron Stone)
- "Game On" (Hit the Floor)
- "Game On" (Homeland)
- "Game On" (Rules of Engagement)
- "Game On" (Switched at Birth)
- "Game On" (The West Wing)

== Literature ==
- Game On, a 2009 novel in the High School Musical book series

== Music ==
- Game On! (album), by Tina Guo, 2017
- Game On (EP), by the James Barker Band, 2017
- "Game On" (Catatonia song), 1998
- "Game On" (Waka Flocka Flame song), featuring Good Charlotte, 2015

== Video gaming ==
- Game On (exhibition), an international touring exhibition on the history of video games
- Game-On, a series of conferences on simulation and AI in computer games
- Game On! USA, a gaming magazine published by Viz Media in 1996
- Game On!, a 2012 video game podcast on the TWiT network
