= Jainendra Jain (screenwriter) =

Indian film screenwriter (1939-2007)

- Born: Jainendra Kumar Jain; 4 October 1939; Surat, Gujarat
- Died: 23 December 2007 (aged 68)
- Occupations: Director, producer and screenwriter

Jainendra Jain (4 October 1939 – 23 December 2007) was a Bollywood film writer, director and film producer based in Mumbai, India.

== Career ==
Jain began his career as a journalist for The Times of India, where he worked for more than a decade. His writing debut, Bobby was released in 1973, it became the second top grossing hit of the 1970s. It also represented the film début for Dimple Kapadia and the first leading role for Rishi Kapoor.

He went on to collaborate frequently with directors such as Raj Kapoor, Bapu, K. Vishwanath, Subhash Ghai, Satish Kaushik and Raj Kanwar.

He wrote several other box office hits like Judaai (1997), Kalicharan (1976), Daag: The Fire (1999) and Tere Naam (2003). His film Andaaz was the screen debuts of Lara Dutta and Priyanka Chopra. His other films were also notable for being the directorial debuts of Subhash Ghai and K. Vishwanath, production debut of Rakesh Roshan as well as first lead roles for Jaya Prada, Khushboo, Padmini Kolhapure and Anil Kapoor.

== Personal life ==
On 23 December 2007, he died due to a lung infection in Mumbai and is survived by his wife and daughters.

== Filmography ==
=== Writer ===
- Teree Sang: A Kidult Love Story (2009)
- Tere Naam (2003)
- Andaaz (2003)
- Dhai Akshar Prem Ke (2000)
- Hamara Dil Aapke Paas Hai (2000)
- Daag (1999)
- Hum Aapke Dil Mein Rehte Hain (1999)
- Judaai (1997)
- Prem Granth (1996)
- Radha Ka Sangam (1992)
- Jaan Se Pyaara (1992)
- Sangeet (1992)
- Henna (1991)
- Prem Pratigyaa (1989)
- Chhota Aadmi (1986)
- Bhavani Junction (1985)
- Jaanoo (1985)
- Sanjog (1985)
- Meraa Ghar Mere Bachche (1985)
- Ram Tere Kitne Nam (1985)
- Shubh Kaamna (1983)
- Woh Saat Din (1983)
- Prem Rog (1982)
- Kaamchor (1982)
- Sargam (1979)
- Bandie (1978)
- Parmatma (1978)
- Chakravyuha (1978)
- Satyam Shivam Sundaram (1978)
- Kalicharan (1976)
- Khaan Dost (1976)
- Bobby (1973)

=== Director ===
- Jaanoo (1985)

=== Producer ===
- Jaanoo (1985)
