= Parinayam =

Parinayam (Sanskrit: परिणयम, pari-ni-am; literally around-lead-noun, referring to saptapadi, the circambulation of two people around a fire for a Hindu wedding ceremony) in Indian languages means marriage and may refer to:

- Parinayam (1994 film), an award-winning Malayalam film
- Sasirekha Parinayam, an Indian folk tale based on the Mahabharata
  - Sasirekha Parinayam (film), a 2009 Telugu film
  - Sasirekha Parinayam (TV series), Telugu
  - Mayabazar (1936 film) also Sasirekha Parinayam
- Usha Parinayam, Indian drama

== See also ==
- Saptapadi (disambiguation)
- Parinay, a 1974 Indian film
- Parinay Fuke, an Indian politician
- Parinay Phuke, an Indian politician
