= Game-On =

Series of academic conferences on simulation and AI in computer games

The Game-On series of academic conferences on simulation and artificial intelligence (AI) in computer games and digital entertainment (Game-On, Game-On NA, and Game-On Asia) has been organized by EUROSIS since 1997 and is aimed at bringing together researchers and practitioners of the games community to exchange ideas on applications and research beneficial both to the gaming industry, academia, and non-entertainment gaming communities.

== History ==
The Game-On conferences started as a special session at TILE (Technology in Leisure Conference) which was held in the Netherlands in 1997.
