= Sangeet (film) =

- Directed by: K. Vishwanath
- Written by: Jainendra Jain
- Produced by: Gulshan Kumar
- Starring: Jackie Shroff; Madhuri Dixit
- Music by: Anand Milind
- Production company: T-Series Films
- Distributed by: T-Series Films
- Release date: 18 September 1992
- Running time: 2 hours 24 min
- Country: India
- Language: Hindi

Sangeet (Music) is a 1992 Hindi film directed by K. Vishwanath starring Jackie Shroff and Madhuri Dixit in lead roles. Madhuri Dixit had a double role as mother and daughter; she later played similar dual mother and daughter role in Aasoo Bane Angarey, released a year later. Dixit's sensitive portrayal in Sangeet was appreciated; despite the film underperforming at the box office and is considered to be one of her best but underrated performances.

== Plot ==
A blind, orphan girl aspires to be a successful singer. With the help of another street performer, she sets out to make a mark, and in the process, she discovers her real parents.

== Cast ==
- Madhuri Dixit as Nirmala / Sangeetha Mother / Daughter Double role
- Jackie Shroff as Sethuram
- Nitish Bharadwaj as Upendra
- Parikshat Sahni as Doctor
- Shafi Inamdar as Yash
- Aruna Irani as Shanta
- Satish Shah as Dhrupad Prasad
- Asha Sharma as Upendra's mother

== Music ==
The music for the film is composed by the duo Anand Milind with lyrics by Santosh Anand.

No.	Title	Singer(s)	Length
1.	"O Rabbaa Koi To Bataae Pyaar Hotaa Hai Kyaa"	Anuradha Paudwal, Suresh Wadkar
2.	"Chhote Chhote Taaron Se"	Anuradha Paudwal
3.	"Sangeet Jahaan Hai Geet Vahaan Hai"	Anuradha Paudwal, Suresh Wadkar
4.	"Jo Geet Nahi Janma"	Anuradha Paudwal, Pankaj Udhas
5.	"Chali Aaiyo Radhe Rani"	Anuradha Paudwal, Suresh Wadkar
6.	"Aap Chahein To Humko"	Anuradha Paudwal
7.	"Main Kangna Khankaun Tum Geet Likho"	Anuradha Paudwal
8.	"Main Tumhari Hoon"	Anuradha Paudwal
9.	"Saat Suron Ke Taar Ban Gaye"	Anuradha Paudwal, Suresh Wadkar
10.	"Sun O Hasina"	Jolly Mukherjee
11.	"Ho Rama Haye Re"	Anuradha Paudwal, Suresh Wadkar
12.	"Chhote Chhote Taaron Se"	Mukul Agarwal
