= Sargam (1979 film) =

1979 film by Kasinathuni Viswanath

- Poster
- Directed by: K. Viswanath
- Written by: K. Viswanath; Jainendra Jain
- Based on: Siri Siri Muvva by K. Viswanath
- Produced by: N. N. Sippy
- Starring: Rishi Kapoor; Jaya Prada
- Cinematography: K. H. Kapadia
- Edited by: Waman Bhonsle; Gurudutt Shirali
- Music by: Laxmikant-Pyarelal
- Release date: 8 January 1979
- Running time: 145 minutes
- Country: India
- Language: Hindi

Sargam is a 1979 Hindi-language drama film written and directed by K. Viswanath. It was the Hindi version of his earlier Telugu film Siri Siri Muvva (1976), which also starred Jaya Prada and made her a star in South India. She made her Hindi film debut with this film, repeating her role of a mute dancer.

The film stars Rishi Kapoor as her partner, Shashikala as her stepmother, Shreeram Lagoo as her father, with Shakti Kapoor, Aruna Irani, Asrani, Vijay Arora and Om Shivpuri. Laxmikant-Pyarelal composed the memorable songs, which won the only Filmfare Award for the film. Anand Bakshi wrote the lyrics. Mohammed Rafi has sung all seven songs, three of them were duets with Lata Mangeshkar, including the famous song, "Dafli Wale Dafli Baja", "Koyal Boli Duniya Doli" and "Parbat Ke Us Paar". The song "Koyal Boli" was shot on the banks of the Godavari River in Rajahmundry, "Parbat Ke Us Par" in Ooty and "Dafli Wale" in Kashmir,and song Hum to chale Pardes pardesi ho gye sung by Mohd Rafi filmed at Wai Maharashtra near Krishna river .

The film became a blockbuster and took 3rd spot at the box office in 1979, behind Suhaag and Jaani Dushman. It made Jaya Prada a sensation and a star overnight in Hindi Cinema and she also earned her first Filmfare nomination as Best Actress in Hindi cinema.

== Plot ==
Hema is a mute young girl who lives with her father, Chintamani Pradhan, stepmother Savitri and stepsister Champa. Savitri dreams about her daughter becoming a star and arranges for her classical dance lessons. Hema also joins her and quickly shows her superior talent. Intolerant Savitri forbids Hema from learning dance anymore. Her father, who is a schoolteacher, was visited by his old student Raju who plays Dafli. Raju tries to cheer Hema up from time to time. One night, Raju finds a woman struggling to get rid of a man and Raju helps her. Later, the woman, Kusum tells him that her husband, Prakash forced her to spend the night with another man. Hema's father passes away, and she is thrown out of the house by Savitri. She is supported by Raju, and they leave the village. Savitri and Champa go to the city to find work, but they realize that they have been conned, and they come back. Prakash still holds grudge against Raju and attacks him in the end when he is rescued by police. Raju and Hema reunite, and Savitri finds the goodness in her heart and accepts Hema as her daughter too.

== Cast ==
- Rishi Kapoor as Raju
- Jaya Prada as Hema Pradhan
- Shashikala as Savitri Pradhan, stepmother
- Dheeraj Kumar as Suresh
- Rajni Sharma as Champa Pradhan
- Leela Mishra as Mausi
- Jankidas as Landlord
- Keshto Mukherjee as Tushar Babu Ghosh / Chatterjee
- Shreeram Lagoo as Masterji Chintamani Pradhan
- Trilok Kapoor as Dinu Chacha
- Om Shivpuri as Pandit
- Shakti Kapoor as Prakash
- Aruna Irani as Kusum
- Asrani as Gopi
- Vijay Arora as Dr. Babu (Guest appearance)
- Kamaldeep as Rapist

== Soundtrack ==
All the songs were composed by Laxmikant-Pyarelal and lyrics were penned by Anand Bakshi. The song “Dafli Wale Dafli Baja” was used as an interlude by Vishal-Shekhar, in the film version of the song "Radha", from Student of the Year, which also starred Kapoor. Sargam was also one of the best-selling Hindi film albums of the 1970s.

Song	Singer	Raga
"Ram Ji Ki Nikli Sawaari"	Mohammed Rafi	
"Mujhe Mat Roko, Mujhe Gaane Do"	Mohammed Rafi	Parmeshwari
"Kahan Tera Insaaf Hai, Kahan Tera Dastoor Hai"	Mohammed Rafi	
"Hum To Chale Pardes, Hum Pardesi Ho Gaye"	Mohammed Rafi	Bhairavi (Hindustani)
"Parbat Ke Us Paar, Parbat Ke Is Paar"	Lata Mangeshkar, Mohammed Rafi	Kirwani
"Koyal Boli, Duniya Doli, Samjho Dil Ki Boli"	Lata Mangeshkar, Mohammed Rafi	Kafi (raga)
"Dafliwale Dafli Baja"	Lata Mangeshkar, Mohammed Rafi	Pahadi

== Awards ==
27th Filmfare Awards
Won

- Best Music Director — Laxmikant-Pyarelal

Nominated

- Best Film — N. N. Sippy
- Best Actor — Rishi Kapoor
- Best Actress — Jaya Prada
- Best Comedian — Asrani
- Best Lyricist — Anand Bakshi
- Best Story — K. Viswanath
