= Subhalekha =

- Theatrical release poster
- Directed by: K. Viswanath
- Written by: Gollapudi Maruti Rao (dialogues)
- Screenplay by: K. Viswanath
- Story by: K. Viswanath
- Produced by: Allu Aravind; V. V. Sastry
- Starring: Chiranjeevi; Sumalata
- Cinematography: Lok Singh
- Edited by: G. G. Krishna Rao
- Music by: K. V. Mahadevan
- Production company: Prashanthi Creations
- Release date: 11 June 1982
- Running time: 139 mins
- Country: India
- Language: Telugu

Subhalekha (transl. Wedding invitation) is a 1982 Telugu-language comedy-drama film written and directed by K. Viswanath. Produced by Allu Aravind and V. V. Sastry under Prasanthi Creations, the film stars Chiranjeevi and Sumalata, with music composed by K. V. Mahadevan. The film addresses the social issue of dowry and emphasizes the dignity of labour, delivering a strong message against the dowry system.

The film was both a critical and commercial success, earning multiple accolades. K. Viswanath won the Nandi Award for Best Story Writer, while Chiranjeevi received his first Filmfare Award for Best Actor for his performance. Viswanath also won the Filmfare Award for Best Director. Subhalekha was remade in Hindi as Shubh Kaamna (1983).

Subhalekha marked the first collaboration between K. Viswanath and Chiranjeevi, a partnership that continued with Swayamkrushi (1987) and Aapadbandhavudu (1992). Released during a period when Chiranjeevi was gaining prominence as a lead actor, following the success of Intlo Ramayya Veedhilo Krishnayya (1982), the film played a key role in further establishing his career. It also introduced actor Sudhakar, whose character became so popular that the title "Subhalekha" was prefixed to his name. Known for its strong social themes, nuanced performances, and memorable music, Subhalekha remains a significant film in Telugu cinema.

== Plot ==
Narasimha Murthy is a highly articulate, multi-talented young man working as a waiter at a luxury hotel due to his repeated failure to clear his Bachelor of Arts examinations. He crosses paths with Sujatha, a principled lecturer employed at a college owned by the corrupt municipal councilor, Ankella Adiseshayya. When Adiseshayya and his eldest son, Mohan, visit Sujatha's home to negotiate a marriage alliance, Adiseshayya demands an exorbitant dowry. Sujatha vehemently objects to the transactional nature of the proposal, triggering a heated confrontation that causes the alliance to collapse. Fearing social ostracism, Sujatha's orthodox parents severely reprimand her. In retaliation for her defiance, Adiseshayya utilizes his administrative influence to terminate Sujatha from her lecturing position.

Murthy steps forward to offer emotional solidarity to Sujatha during her unemployment. However, the conservative local community misinterprets their platonic friendship as an illicit romantic affair, forcing a humiliated Sujatha to abandon her home. Seeking retribution for her plight, Murthy publicly humiliates Adiseshayya during a high-profile civic felicitation ceremony. Adiseshayya retaliates by deploying local thugs to assault Murthy and subsequently orchestrates his termination from the hotel.

Left with no alternative, Murthy and Sujatha relocate to Hyderabad to rebuild their lives. They seek the assistance of Rao, a wealthy corporate executive whom Murthy had previously befriended while serving him at the hotel. Recognizing Sujatha's academic credentials, Rao secures her a well-paying administrative position at his firm, Allwyn, allowing her to achieve financial autonomy. Concurrently, back in their hometown, Sujatha's younger sister, Lakshmi, falls in love with Murali, Adiseshayya's progressive younger son. Opposed to his father's avarice, Murali forces Adiseshayya to approve their marriage by threatening suicide. Stripped of his leverage, Adiseshayya reluctantly consents to the union with a minimal dowry settlement.

Following the wedding, Lakshmi joins Sujatha in Hyderabad. Backed entirely by her husband's consent, Lakshmi files a highly unorthodox lawsuit against her father-in-law. She demands formal custody of Murali, satirically arguing before the court that since her family paid a financial transaction to "purchase" the groom, he is legally her property and must be separated from Adiseshayya's patriarchal household.

The impending legal scandal throws Adiseshayya into a panic. He, his family, and Sujatha's estranged parents rush to Hyderabad to resolve the crisis, arriving just as arrangements are being finalized for Sujatha's marriage to her employer, Rao. In the ensuing confrontation, Adiseshayya's systemic greed is thoroughly exposed, forcing him to concede to the younger generation's terms. Realizing her true feelings and valuing his unwavering moral support, Sujatha chooses to marry Murthy instead. The film concludes as a defeated Adiseshayya returns to his home, only to discover that his eldest son, Mohan, has independently rebelled as well by marrying Murthy's widowed cousin, signaling the total collapse of his materialistic authority.

== Cast ==
- Chiranjeevi as Narasimha Murthy
- Sumalata as Sujatha
- Satyanarayana as Ankella Adiseshayya
- Allu Ramalingaiah as Lawyer Chillara Bhavani Sankaram
- Ramana Murthy as Jagannatham
- Sudhakar as Murali
- Rallapalli as Gurnadham
- Sakshi Ranga Rao as Bhavanarayana
- Girish Pradhan as Mohan
- Arun as Rao
- Potti Prasad as Server Subba Rao
- Vankayala Satyanarayana as Principal Challeswara Rao
- Hema Sundar as Hotel Proprietor Bhatt
- C.H.Krishnamurthy as Srinivasa Rao
- Jeet Mohan Mitra as Kesava Rao
- Krishna Chaitanya
- Dham as Peon
- Tulasi as Lakshmi
- Pushpakumari as Sujatha's mother
- Anupama as Satyavathi
- Malini
- Nirmalamma as Narasimha Murthy's grandmother

== Production ==
Subhalekha was written and directed by K. Viswanath, known for addressing social issues in his films. With Subhalekha, he focused on the dowry system. The film's story is considered a reworking of his earlier film Siri Siri Muvva (1976), with a similar theme later explored in his film Swarnakamalam (1988). The film's screenplay and story were developed to highlight the consequences of the dowry system, continuing Viswanath's tradition of blending social commentary with accessible storytelling.

The film was produced under the Prasanthi Creations banner by Allu Aravind and V. V. Sastry. The shooting took place across multiple locations, including the Dolphin Hotel in Visakhapatnam and Bhagyanagar Studios in Hyderabad.

The film served as a major breakthrough for actress Sumalatha, who had previously worked in smaller films. Her collaboration with Chiranjeevi in Subhalekha was followed by further successful pairings in films like Aalaya Sikharam, Khaidi, Agni Gundam, and Veta. Subhalekha also marked the debut of actor Sudhakar, who played the supporting role of Murali. Director K. Viswanath personally selected him for the role, and his character became popular enough to earn him the prefix "Subhalekha" in his screen name.

== Themes ==
Subhalekha is noted for its examination of the dowry system, a prevalent social issue in India. The film emphasizes the dignity of labor, particularly through the character of Narasimhamurthy, a waiter who stands against societal pressures related to dowry demands. The film avoids preachiness, instead delivering its message through the interactions and development of its characters.

The central theme of dowry had been previously explored in Telugu cinema, with films like Kanyasulkam (1955) and Varakatnam (1970). However, Subhalekha stood out for addressing this issue to a new generation of viewers in the 1980s. The film's characters, portrayed as everyday individuals rather than conventional cinematic heroes, added a layer of realism. Murthy's role as a waiter was unconventional for a male lead in that era, while Sujatha, the female protagonist, faces societal challenges while striving for independence.

Viswanath's signature style, blending social commentary with humanistic narratives, is evident throughout Subhalekha. The film incorporates classical Carnatic music into key moments, contributing to its distinctive narrative style. Subhalekha also falls in line with Viswanath's broader body of work, in which male protagonists support female characters in gaining confidence and independence, reinforcing themes of mutual respect and equality in relationships.

== Music ==
Subhalekha

Film score by K. V. Mahadevan
- Released: 1982
- Genre: Soundtrack
- Length: 26:54
- Label: SAREGAMA Audio
- Producer: K. V. Mahadevan

K. V. Mahadevan chronology
Ekalavya (1982)	Subhalekha (1982)	Krishnavataram (1982)

Music was composed by K. V. Mahadevan. The film features a mix of original compositions and classical songs. Songs like "Ragalapallakilo Koyilamma" and "Aithe... Ade Nijamaithe" were popular among the audience. The film also used traditional compositions, such as Annamacharya's "Neyyamulallo Nereello" and Tyagaraja's "Marugelara O Raghava".

Track listing
No.	Title	Lyrics	Singer(s)	Length
1.	"Ayithe"	Veturi	S. P. Balasubrahmanyam, S. P. Sailaja	4:24
2.	"Vinnapaalu Vinavale Vintavintalu"	Annamayya	S. Janaki	3:24
3.	"Neyyamulallo"	Annamayya	S. P. Balasubrahmanyam	4:07
4.	"Raagala Pallakilo"	Veturi	S. P. Balasubrahmanyam, P. Susheela	4:25
5.	"Nee Jada Kucchulu Naa Medakucchulu"	Veturi	S. P. Balasubrahmanyam, S. Janaki	4:45
6.	"Oho Taddhimi Takajhanu"	Veturi	S. Janaki, Poornachander Rao	4:19
7.	"Marugelaraa O Raaghavaa"	Tyagaraja	S. Janaki	1:30
Total length:				24:04

== Reception ==
Subhalekha was well-received both commercially and critically. Chiranjeevi's performance was praised for balancing his dancing prowess with a grounded portrayal of Murthy. Sumalatha's performance as Sujatha showcased her maturity, despite being only 19 years old at the time. Tulasi, playing Sujatha's younger sister, was also commended for her lively performance.

The film's social relevance and K. Viswanath's deft handling of sensitive themes contributed to its success. Unlike the formulaic love stories of the time, Subhalekha stood out for its realistic characters and social messaging.

== Legacy ==
Subhalekha is considered an important film in Chiranjeevi's career, showcasing his acting and dancing abilities. The classical dance scene in the film, featuring Chiranjeevi performing various dance forms, was particularly well received. The film marked the beginning of a successful collaboration between Chiranjeevi and K. Viswanath, who later worked together on Swayamkrushi and Aapadbandhavudu.

== Awards ==
Filmfare Awards

Year	Nominee / work	Award	Result
1982	Chiranjeevi (for 1st time)	Filmfare Award for Best Telugu Actor	Won
1982	K. Viswanath	Filmfare Award for Best Director – Telugu	Won

Nandi Awards

- 1982 - Nandi Award for Best Story Writer - K. Viswanath
