= O Seeta Katha =

- Directed by: K. Viswanath
- Written by: Gollapudi Maruti Rao
- Produced by: A. R. S. Sarma
- Starring: Kanta Rao; Chandra Mohan; Roja Ramani; Devadas Kanakala
- Cinematography: G. V. R. Yoganand
- Edited by: B. Gopal Rao
- Music by: K. V. Mahadevan
- Release date: 1974
- Country: India
- Language: Telugu

O Seeta Katha (transl. Story of a Seeta) is a 1974 Indian Telugu-language film directed by K. Viswanath starring Kanta Rao, Chandra Mohan, Roja Ramani and Devadas Kanakala.

The film won the Nandi Award for Best Feature Film (Silver), and the Filmfare Best Film Award (Telugu). The film was later remade both in Malayalam and Tamil languages as Mattoru Seetha and Moondru Mudichu, respectively.

== Plot ==
Seeta (Roja Ramani), a teenage girl, lives with her mother and elder sister (Subha), who runs the house with her harikatha performances. Seeta falls in love with Chandram (Chandramohan), but Gopalakrishna (Devadas Kanakala) has an eye on her and hires goons to bash Chandram, who dies on the spot. Seeta marries Madhava Rao (Kantha Rao), father of Gopalakrishna, and makes Gopalakrishna realize his mistakes.

== Cast ==
- Kanta Rao as Madhava Rao
- Chandra Mohan as Chandram
- Roja Ramani as Seeta
- Devadas Kanakala as Gopalakrishna
- Allu Ramalingayya
- Shubha
- Ramaprabha
- Pandari Bai

== Production ==
C. Aswini Dutt made his debut as an executive producer for the film.

== Songs ==
The music was composed by K. V. Mahadevan with lyrics by Veturi and C. Narayana Reddy.

- "Bhaaratanaarii Charitamu" (Harikatha)
  - Lyrics: Veturi
  - Playback: P. Leela
- "Malle Kannaa Tellana Maa Seeta Sogasu"
  - Lyrics: C. Narayana Reddy
  - Playback: S. P. Balasubrahmanyam, P. Suseela
- "Puttadi Bomma Maa Pellipaduchu"
  - Lyrics: C. Narayana Reddy
  - Playback: S. P. Balasubrahmanyam, P. Suseela
- "Kallaakapatam Erugani Pillalu Allari Cheste Andam"
  - Lyrics: C. Narayana Reddy
  - Playback: P. Suseela
- "Ninu Kanna Katha, Mee Amma Katha Vinipinchanaa"
  - Lyrics: Veturi
  - Playback: B. Vasanta, P. Suseela
- "Chintachiguru Pulupani Cheekatante Nalupani"
  - Lyrics: Veturi
  - Playback: S. P. Balasubrahmanyam

== Release ==
The film was screened at the Asian and African film Festival at Tashkent.

== Awards ==
Nandi Awards – 1974

- Second Best Feature Film – Silver – A.R.S. Sharma

Filmfare Awards South – 1974

- Filmfare Best Director Award (Telugu) – K. Viswanath
- Filmfare Best Film Award (Telugu) – A. R. S. Sarma
