= Badmash Gallaki Bumper Offer =

Indian film

- Directed by: Ravi Chavali
- Story: Ravi Chavali
- Screenplay: Ravi Chavali
- Produced by: Aalapati Shekhar; Athindha Avinash
- Starring: Indrasena; Santhosh; Pregya; Merin Philip
- Cinematography: Vijay C Kumar
- Edited by: Marthand. K. Venkatesh
- Music by: Background Music : Bhole Shavali; Songs: Bhole Shavali
- Production company: Friends Film Academy
- Release date: 29 December 2023
- Country: India
- Language: Telugu

Badmash Gallaki Bumper Offer is an Indian Telugu movie released on 29 December 2023. under Friends Film Academy Banner Aalavala Shekhar and Athindha Avinash Produced the film and Ravi Chavali directed this film. The movie was released on 29 December 2023. which Stairs Indrasena, Santhosh, Pragya, Merin Philip, Naveen Reddy and Subhalekha Sudhakar

== Cast ==
- Indrasena
- Santhosh
- Pragya
- Myran Philip
- Naveena Reddy
- Subhalekha Sudhakar
- Satya Prakash
- Duvvasi Mohan
- Gharasana Srinivas
- Usha

== Technical Crew ==
- Banner: Cashu Creations
- Producer:N. Ramesh Kumar
- Story, Screenplay, Direction : Ravi Chavali
- Music Director: Bhole Shavali
