= Mattoru Seetha =

- Poster
- Directed by: P. Bhaskaran
- Screenplay by: Sreekumaran Thampi
- Story by: K. Vishwanath
- Starring: Kamal Haasan; Shobana; Vincent
- Cinematography: S. J. Thomas
- Edited by: K. Shankunni
- Music by: V. Dakshinamoorthy
- Production company: A. G. Films
- Distributed by: Sili Agencies
- Release date: 17 October 1975
- Country: India
- Language: Malayalam

Mattoru Seetha (transl. The Second Seetha) is a 1975 Indian Malayalam-language film, directed by P. Bhaskaran, starring Kamal Haasan, Roja Ramani (credited as Shobana), Sheela, Adoor Bhasi, Bahadoor, Sukumari, Jose Prakash, Prema Menon, M. G. Soman and Vincent. It is a remake of the 1974 Telugu film O Seeta Katha.

== Plot ==
Seetha, a teenage girl, lives with her mother and elder sister, who runs the house with her harikatha performances. Seetha falls in love with Chandran, but Gopi has an eye on her and hires goons to bash Chandran, who dies in the beating. Seeta marries Menon, father of Gopi, and makes Gopi realize his mistakes.

== Cast ==
- Kamal Haasan as Gopi
- Shobana as Seetha
- Vincent as Chandran
- M. G. Soman
- Sheela
- Adoor Bhasi
- Bahadoor
- Jose Prakash
- Prema Menon
- Sreelatha Namboothiri
- Master Raghu (Karan)
- Kaviyoor Ponnamma
- Sukumari
- Paul Vengola

== Production ==
Mattoru Seetha film was directed by P. Bhaskaran. It is a remake of the 1973 Telugu film O Seetha Katha, directed by K. Vishwanath.

Kamal Haasan played the anti-hero role in the Malayalam version, which was later played by Rajinikanth in the Tamil version.

The final length of the film's prints were 4,345.29 metres (14,256.2 ft) long.

== Soundtrack ==
The music was composed by V. Dakshinamoorthy and the lyrics were written by P. Bhaskaran. Playback singer Ayiroor Sadasivan has sung two songs in this film.

Song	Singers	Lyrics
"Eechayum Poochayum"	Jayashree	P. Bhaskaran
"Kaamini Mouliyaam"	P. Leela, Ayiroor Sadasivan, T. R. Omana	P. Bhaskaran
"Kattakkattakkayarittu"	Ambili, Chorus	P. Bhaskaran
"Muttathoru Panthal"	K. J. Yesudas, P. Susheela	P. Bhaskaran
"Thattaamburathunni"	Jayashree	P. Bhaskaran
"Udayathaaraka"	P. Leela, Ayiroor Sadasivan, T. R. Omana	P. Bhaskaran
