= Jaanoo =

- Directed by: Jainendra Jain
- Written by: Jainendra Jain
- Produced by: Jainendra Jain
- Starring: Jackie Shroff; Khushbu; Rati Agnihotri
- Cinematography: Siba Mishra
- Edited by: Hussain A. Burmawala
- Music by: Laxmikant–Pyarelal
- Release date: 30 October 1985 (India)
- Country: India
- Language: Hindi

Jaanoo is a 1985 Indian Hindi-language film produced and directed by Jainendra Jain. It stars Jackie Shroff, Khushbu and Rati Agnihotri in pivotal roles. It was Kushboo’a official acting debut not only in Hindi cinemas, but in later South Indian industry- as she was previously seen in about 10-15 all Hindi movies as a child artist.

== Cast ==
- Jackie Shroff as Ravi
- Khushbu as Bittu
- Rati Agnihotri as Kanchan
- Saeed Jaffrey as Shastri
- Sulabha Deshpande as Shantatai
- Anupam Kher as Mr. Mathur
- Beena Banerjee as Dr. Prabha
- Iftekhar as Dr. Prabha's senior

== Music ==
1. "Chakdam Chakdam Pyar Hai" - Manhar Udhas, Anuradha Paudwal
2. "Jitna Kabhi Kisi Ne Kisi Ko" - Manhar Udhas, Anuradha Paudwal
3. "Sajan Tu Mujhe Utha Kar" - Anuradha Paudwal
4. "Chhodo Mujhko Chhodo" - Manhar Udhas
5. "Pappa Ki Baaton Ka (I)" - Rajeshwari, Manhar Udhas, Anuradha Paudwal
6. "Pappa Ki Baaton Ka (II)" - Manhar Udhas
