= Sanjog (1985 film) =

- Theatrical release poster
- Directed by: K. Vishwanath
- Written by: Jainendra Jain (dialogues)
- Screenplay by: K. Vishwanath
- Story by: K. Rama Lakshmi
- Based on: Jeevana Jyothi (1975)
- Produced by: P. Mallikharjuna Rao
- Starring: Jeetendra; Jaya Prada
- Cinematography: V. Durgaprasad
- Edited by: Waman Bhosle; Gurudutt Shirali
- Music by: Laxmikant Pyarelal
- Production company: Bharati International
- Release date: 22 November 1985
- Running time: 150 minutes
- Country: India
- Language: Hindi

Sanjog (transl. Coincidence) is a 1985 Indian Hindi-language drama film, produced by P. Mallikharjuna Rao under the Bharati International banner, directed by K. Vishwanath. It stars Jeetendra, Jaya Prada and music composed by Laxmikant Pyarelal. It is the Hindi version of Viswanath's Telugu film Jeevana Jyothi (1975), starring Sobhan Babu, Vanisri in the pivotal roles

== Cast ==
- Jeetendra as Naren
- Jaya Prada as Yashoda / Asha (Dual Role)
- Vinod Mehra as Sonu
- Bharati Achrekar as Lalita
- Asrani as Chandu
- Aruna Irani as Sunaina
- Arvind Deshpande as Naren's Father
- Agha
- Goga Kapoor
- Yunus Parvez as Lalaji
- Renu Joshi

== Soundtrack ==
Lyricist: Anjaan

#	Title	Singer(s)
1	"Dil Kya Chaahe"	Kishore Kumar, Asha Bhosle
2	"Zu Zu Zu"	Lata Mangeshkar
3	"Yashoda Ka Nandalala"	Lata Mangeshkar
4	"Chham Se Tu Aaye"	Suresh Wadkar, Asha Bhosle
5	"Aankh Micholi Aise"	S. P. Sailaja, Kavita Krishnamurthy
6	"Maa Main Kahan Hoon"	S. P. Sailaja, Kavita Krishnamurthy
7	"Zu Zu Zu Zu Zu" (male)	Suresh Wadkar
8	"Zu Zu Zu, Pt. 2"	Lata Mangeshkar

== Reception ==
Sanjog was a critically acclaimed movie. It opened to positive to mixed reviews. It also became a hit at the box office.

== Awards ==
Jaya Prada earned her third Filmfare Nomination as Best Actress, the only nomination for the film.
