= Shubh Kaamna =

- Directed by: K. Viswanath
- Written by: Jainendra Jain
- Produced by: V. V. Shastri
- Starring: Rakesh Roshan; Rati Agnihotri; Vinod Mehra; Sujit Kumar; Utpal Dutt; Om Prakash
- Music by: R. D. Burman
- Production company: Prashanthi Creations
- Release date: 14 October 1983
- Country: India
- Language: Hindi

Shubh Kaamna (transl. Good Wishes) is a 1983 Indian Hindi-language comedy drama film directed by K. Viswanath and produced by V. V. Shastri. The film stars Rakesh Roshan, Rati Agnihotri, with Vinod Mehra, Sujit Kumar, Utpal Dutt, Om Prakash and music for the film was scored by R. D. Burman. The film is a remake of Viswanath's Telugu film Subhalekha (1982).

The film was released on 14 October 1983.

This movie features a scene shot in the actual Allwyn Watch assembly plant in Hyderabad, making a direct reference to the iconic brand of that time.

== Cast ==
- Rakesh Roshan as Ratan
- Rati Agnihotri as Sujata
- Vinod Mehra as Mr. Mehra
- Sujit Kumar as Jagannath
- Utpal Dutt as Vishwamitra Pandey
- Om Prakash as Vithalbhai
- Asrani as Khadkhade
- Shammi as Ratan's Aunt
- Satyen Kappu as Bansi
- Dinesh Thakur as Professor Khatri
- Paintal as Dubey
- Ashalata Wabgaonkar as Sujata's Mother
- Renuka as Nirmala
- Sunil Dhawan as Chaubey
- Kiran Vairale as Viji
- Sudhakar as Viji's Lover
- Geetha as Nurse

== Soundtrack ==
Lyrics: Anjaan

| Song | Singer |
|---|---|
| "Hawa Yeh Prabhati" | Lata Mangeshkar |
| "Pathshala Mein Idur" | S. P. Balasubrahmanyam |
| "Baghon Mein Khile Hain Kaise Kaise" | S. P. Balasubrahmanyam, Asha Bhosle |
| "Is Dil Ne Socha Hai Jo, Sach Wahi Ho Jaye" | S. P. Balasubrahmanyam, Asha Bhosle |
| "Tumko Hai Pyar Mana, Is Dil Ka Yaar Mana" | S. P. Balasubrahmanyam, Asha Bhosle |
