= Saptapadi =

Hindu wedding rite

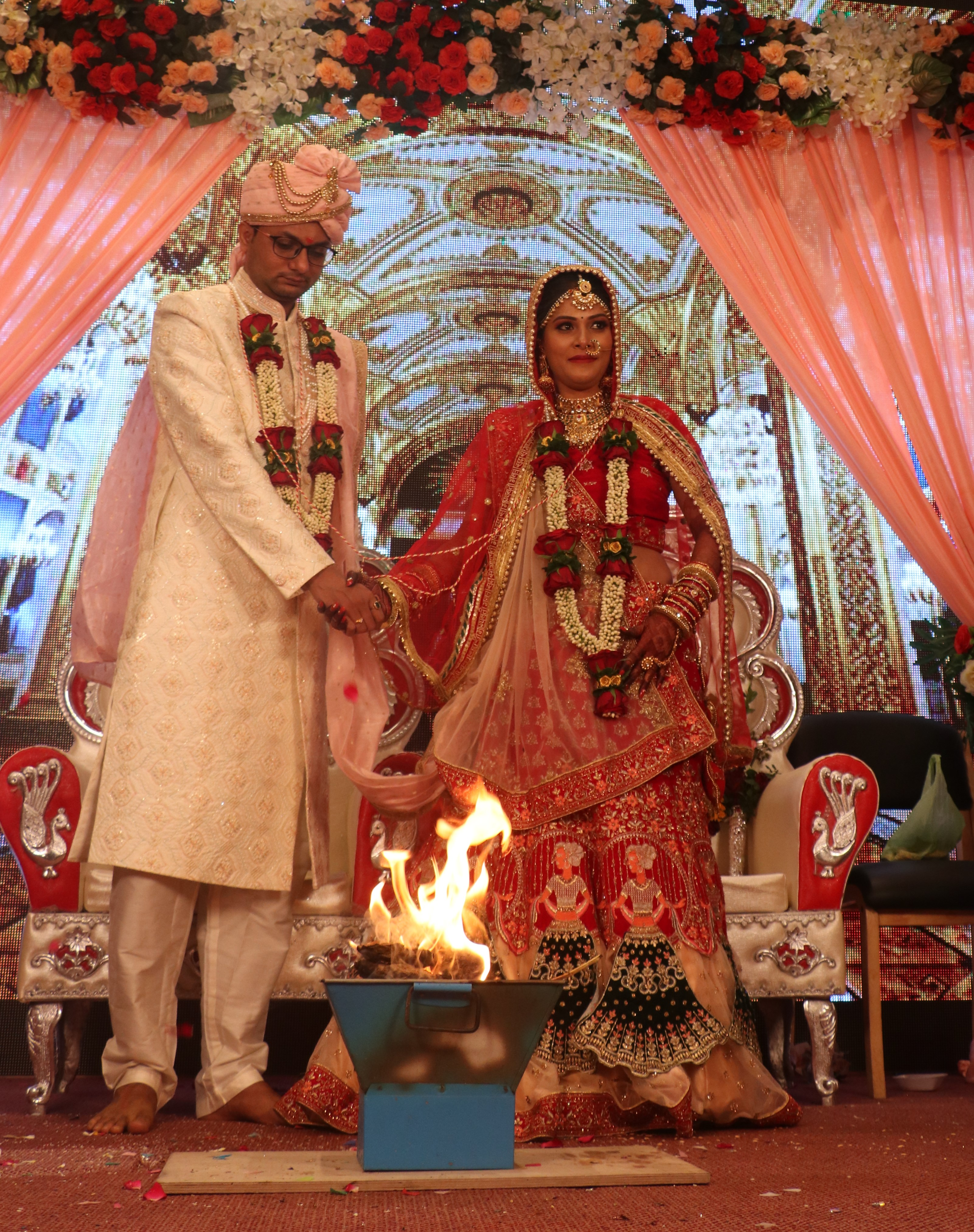
The bride and groom circumambulate a consecrated fire seven times, reciting specific vows with each circuit. Vows made in the presence of the sacred fire are considered unbreakable, with Agnideva held as both witnessing and blessing the couple's union.

Saptapadi (Sanskrit: सप्तपदी, romanized: Saptapadī, lit. 'taking together seven steps'), or saat phere (Marathi: सात फेरे, romanized: sāt phéré, lit. 'seven circumambulations'), is regarded to be the most important rite (Sanskrit: rītī) of a Hindu wedding ceremony.

In this rite, the bride and the groom tie a knot and take seven steps together, or complete seven rounds around a sacred fire, accompanied by one vow for each step. After the seventh, the marriage is considered complete.

== Description ==
The saptapadi is an ancient ritual that dates back to the Vedic period.

The circumambulation of the sacred altar of fire is a rite that is performed differently in various regions of South Asia. In some regions, the couple walks around the altar seven times. In other regions, the couple takes seven steps to complete a single circumambulation. Each of the seven has a different meaning.

At each step or circuit, the couple may also take vows. Vows made in the presence of the sacred fire are considered unbreakable, with Agnideva held as both witnessing and blessing the couple's union.

=== Vows ===
In southern and western India, the seven stops are completed with the recitation of vows:

Now let us make a vow together. We shall share love, share the same food, share our strengths, share the same tastes. We shall be of one mind, we shall observe the vows together. I shall be the Samaveda, you the Rigveda, I shall be the Upper World, you the Earth; I shall be the Sukhilam, you the Holder - together we shall live and beget children, and other riches; come thou, O sweet-worded girl!

In northern India, the bride and the groom say the following words after completing the seven steps:

We have taken the Seven Steps. You have become mine forever. Yes, we have become partners. I have become yours. Hereafter, I cannot live without you. Do not live without me. Let us share the joys. We are word and meaning, united. You are thought and I am sound. May the night be honey-sweet for us. May the morning be honey-sweet for us. May the earth be honey-sweet for us. May the heavens be honey-sweet for us. May the plants be honey-sweet for us. May the sun be all honey for us. May the cows yield us honey-sweet milk. As the heavens are stable, as the earth is stable, as the mountains are stable, as the whole universe is stable, so may our union be permanently settled.

=== Seven pheras ===
The Saat phere or the seven pradakshinas (circumambulations) are as follows:

1. In the first round or phera, the couple prays to God for plenty of nourishing and pure food. They pray to God to let them walk together so that they will get food.
2. In the second round or phera, the couple prays to God for a healthy and prosperous life. They ask for the physical, spiritual and mental health from God.
3. In the third phera, the couple prays to God for wealth. They ask God for the strength for both of them so that they can share the happiness and pain together. Also, they pray so that they can walk together to get wealth.
4. In the fourth round, the couple prays to God for the increase in love and respect for each other and their respective families.
5. In the fifth round, the bride and groom together pray for the beautiful, heroic and noble children from God.
6. In the sixth round around the fire, the couple asks for the peaceful long life with each other.
7. In the final seventh round, the couple prays to god for companionship, togetherness, loyalty and understanding between themselves. They ask God to make them friends and give the maturity to carry out the friendship for lifetime. The husband says to his new wife that now they have become friends after the Seven Vows/Saat Phere and they will not break their friendship in life.

Alt

The vows taken in each phera are as below:

1. With the first phera, the couple invokes the gods for the plenitude of pure and nourishing food and a life that is noble and respectful.
2. With the second phera the couple prays for physical and mental strength and to lead a healthy and peaceful life.
3. The third phera is taken for the fulfilment of spiritual obligations. The gods are invoked for blessing the couple with spiritual strength.
4. The fourth phera is taken for the attainment of happiness and harmony through mutual love and trust and a long joyous life together.
5. The fifth phera is taken to pray for the welfare of all living entities in the entire universe and for begetting noble children.
6. The sixth phera is for bountiful seasons all over the world. The couple prays for bountiful seasons and seeks that they may go through these seasons together, just as they would share their joys and sorrows.
7. With the last phera they pray for a life of understanding, loyalty, unity and companionship not only for themselves but also for the peace of the universe.

Having exchanged these vows of love, duty, respect, fidelity and a fruitful union the couple agree to be companions forever. The process of saat phere acquires more significance in that the couple prays for the peace and well-being of the entire universe.

== In popular culture ==
- In 1961, a Bengali film was released in Tollywood, directed by Ajoy Kar, named Saptapadi.
- The 1981 Telugu film Saptapadi directed by Kaasinathuni Viswanath won a National Film Award in India.
- The song, Jab Tak Poore na ho Phere Saat (transl. Until seven pheras are not completed), from the 1982 Bollywood film Nadiya Ke Paar , highlighted the importance of the Saptapadi ceremony. The song starred popular star Sachin with Sadhana Singh with music by Ravindra Jain.
- Saptapadii, a Gujarati film directed by Niranjan Thade, was released in 2013.

== See also ==
- Hindu wedding
