= Game On (film) =

- Theatrical release poster
- Directed by: Dayanand
- Written by: Dayanand
- Produced by: Ravi Kasthuri
- Starring: Geetanand; Neha Solanki; Madhubhala; Adithya Menon; Subhalekha Sudhakar
- Cinematography: Aravind Viswanathan
- Edited by: Vamsi Attluri
- Music by: Abhishek A.R
- Production company: Kasthuri Creations
- Release date: 2 February 2024
- Country: India
- Language: Telugu

Game on is a 2024 Indian Telugu film produced by Ravi Kasturi under the banner Kasturi Creations and directed by Dayanand. It stars Geetanand, Neha Solanki, Madhubala, Aditya Menon and Subhalekha Sudhakar. The film was released on 2 February 2024.

== Cast ==
- Geetanand as Siddharth
- Neha Solanki as Tara
- Madhubhala
- Adithya Menon
- Subhalekha Sudhakar

== Reception ==
Paul Nicodemus of The Times of India rated the film two-and-a-half out of five stars and wrote that "Game On is a partly engaging psychological thriller that attempts to combine suspense, emotional depth, and action. With its strong performances and technical prowess, the film unfolds a unique story that succeeds in parts—a fragmented triumph." Raisa Nasreen of Times Now gave it two-and-a-half out of five stars and opined that "Geetanand, Neha Solanki’s Film Is A Riveting Tale Of Life's Transformative Game".

Nelki Naresh Kumar of Hindustan Times Telugu rated the film two-and-a-half out of five stars and considered the film to be a passable entertainer for those with low expectations. A critic from Sakshi gave the film two-and-a-half out of five stars, noting that the second half loses some pace compared to the first half.
