= Chinnabbayi =

- Theatrical release poster
- Directed by: K. Viswanath
- Written by: Satyanand (dialogues)
- Screenplay by: K. Viswanath
- Story by: K. Viswanath
- Produced by: M. Narasimha Rao
- Starring: Venkatesh; Ramyakrishna; Ravali
- Cinematography: S. Gopal Reddy
- Edited by: G. G. Krishna Rao
- Music by: Ilayaraja
- Production company: Raasi Movies
- Release date: 10 January 1997
- Running time: 144 minutes
- Country: India
- Language: Telugu

Chinnabbayi (transl. Younger son) is a 1997 Telugu-language romantic comedy film directed by K. Viswanath and produced by M. Narasimha Rao under Raasi Movies. It stars Venkatesh, Ramya Krishnan and Ravali, with music composed by Ilaiyaraaja. The film was a flop at the box office. The film was dubbed in Tamil as College Galatta.

== Cast ==
- Venkatesh as Sundaraiah
- Ramya Krishna as Indira Devi
- Ravali as Satyavathi
- Indraja as Lalitha
- Satyanarayana
- Kota Srinivasa Rao
- Subhalekha Sudhakar
- Satya Prakash
- AVS
- Sakshi Ranga Rao
- Suthi Velu
- Chitti Babu
- Misro
- Rajasimha
- Jeet Mohan Mitra
- Srividya
- Srilakshmi
- Siva Parvathi
- Nagaraja Kumari
- Meena Kumari
- Parvathi
- Master Anilraj

== Soundtrack ==
Chinnabbai

Soundtrack album by Ilayaraja
- Released: 1997
- Genre: Soundtrack
- Length: 36:44
- Label: T-Series
- Producer: Ilayaraja

Ilayaraja chronology
Srikaram (1996)	Chinnabbai (1997)	Antahpuram (1998)

Music composed by Ilaiyaraaja. Music released on T-Series Audio Company.

No.	Title	Lyrics	Singer(s)	Length
1.	"Telusuko Telusuko"	Sirivennela Sitarama Sastry	S. P. Balasubrahmanyam, Chitra, Malgudi Subha	5:45
2.	"Vinnapalu Vinamani"	Sirivennela Sitarama Sastry	S. P. Balasubrahmanyam, S. P. Sailaja	5:21
3.	"Ninna Chusina Udayam"	Sirivennela Sitarama Sastry	S. P. Balasubrahmanyam, Sujatha	4:30
4.	"Adagakandi"	Sirivennela Sitarama Sastry	S. P. Balasubrahmanyam, Sujatha	5:02
5.	"Antha Randoy"	Sirivennela Sitarama Sastry	S. P. Balasubrahmanyam, Chitra	6:18
6.	"Navvulo Puttanu"	Sirivennela Sitarama Sastry	S. P. Balasubrahmanyam	4:06
7.	"Jajimalli Tella Cheera"	Bhuvanachandra	S. P. Balasubrahmanyam, Chitra	5:42
Total length:				36:44
