= Siri Siri Muvva =

1976 Indian film by K. Viswanath

- Directed by: K. Viswanath
- Screenplay by: K. Viswanath
- Dialogue by: Jandhyala Veturi
- Starring: Jaya Prada; Chandra Mohan; Satyanarayana Kaikala; Devadas Kanakala; Ramaprabha; Kavitha; Ramana Murthi J. V. Sakshi Ranga Rao
- Cinematography: V. S. R. Swamy
- Edited by: K. Babu Rao
- Music by: K. V. Mahadevan
- Production company: Geeta Krishna Combines
- Release date: 24 December 1976
- Running time: 144 minutes
- Country: India
- Language: Telugu

Siri Siri Muvva is a 1976 Indian Telugu-language drama film written and directed by K. Viswanath. It stars Jaya Prada and Chandra Mohan. K. Viswanath later remade the film in Hindi with leading lady Jaya Prada, as Sargam, in 1979. Siri Siri Muvva was screened at the International Film Festival of India, and Moscow International Film Festival, and has received two National Film Awards.

== Plot ==
Hyma (Jaya Prada) is a mute girl who is passionate about dancing. She is ill-treated by her stepmother (Rama Prabha), who wants to make her daughter Savithri (Kavitha) a film heroine. Sambayya (Chandra Mohan), an orphan, is in love with Hyma, and saves her from being cheated by her vile stepmother and her nephew, Badram (Devadas Kanakala).

Sambayya takes Hyma to the city after her father's (Satyanarayana) death, where he is afflicted by TB. Hyma earns money by dancing at a Kalakshetra. Sambayya wants her to marry the organizer Ram Babu, but Hyma's heart beats only for her loyal companion Sambayya. Savithri acts in a movie and is shunned by all, and Hyma takes care of them. All is forgiven. Sambayya and Hyma get married in the end.

== Cast ==
- Jaya Prada as Hyma
- Chandra Mohan as Sambayya
- Kaikala Satyanarayana as Rudraiah, Hyma's father
- Kavitha as Savithri
- Rama Prabha as Tripura, Hyma's stepmother
- Devadas Kanakala as Bhadram
- Nirmalamma
- J. V. Ramana Murthi
- Allu Ramalingaiah
- Sakshi Ranga Rao

== Production ==
Edida Nageswara Rao, who started as a junior artist and dubbing artist, ventured into filmmaking and, along with friends from Kakinada, successfully dubbed and released the Tamil film Venkateswara Kalyanam in Telugu, which inspired them to pursue making a direct Telugu film. Leveraging his connection with K. Viswanath, Nageswara Rao approached him to direct a new project, resulting in Siri Siri Muvva (1976), where Nageswara Rao managed all production activities as the executive producer. The film was a success, earning profits for the group.

== Music ==
All songs written by Veturi.

- "Andaaniki Andam Ee Puttadibomma" (Singer: S. P. Balasubrahmanyam)
- "Eavarikevaru Ee Lokamlo Evariki Eruka" (Singer: S. P. Balasubrhamanyam)
- "Gajje Ghallumantuntae Gunde Jhallumantundi" (Singer: S. P. Balasubrahmanyam)
- "Jhummandhi Nadam Saiyyandi Padam" (Singers: P. Susheela, S. P. Balasubrahmanyam)
- "Maa Voori Devudamma" (Singers: S. P. Balasubrahmanyam, Pattabhi)
- "Odupunna Pilupu Odigunna Pulupu" (Singers: P. Susheela, S. P. Balasubrahmanyam)
- "Raa Digiraa Divinunchi Bhuviki Digiraa" (Singer: S. P. Balasubrahmanyam)
- "Godaralle Ennetlo Godaralle" (Singers: P. Susheela, S. P. Balasubrahmanyam)
- "Pilicahanu Eduta Nilichanu" (Singers: P. Susheela, S. P. Balasubrahmanyam)

== Awards ==
- National Film Award for Best Female Playback Singer - P. Susheela
- National Film Award for Best Editing - K. Babu Rao
