= European Multidisciplinary Society for Modelling and Simulation Technology =

The European Multidisciplinary Society for Modelling and Simulation Technology (EUROSIS) is a European learned society in the area of computer simulation and modelling.

== Background ==
EUROSIS is a non-profit society. It is run by a board of trustees, who manage the day-to-day operations, while the scientific part is run by a collective of EUROSIS members, distributed amongst a board and numerous technical committees. EUROSIS organizes a number of annual conferences and produces several publications.
