= Saptapadi (1981 film) =

1981 Indian Telugu Language film

- Theatrical Release poster
- Directed by: K. Viswanath
- Screenplay by: K. Viswanath
- Dialogue by: Jandhyala
- Story by: K. Viswanath
- Produced by: Bhimavarapu Buchhireddy
- Starring: J.V. Somayajulu; Allu Rama Lingaiah; P. Ravi Shankar; Sabita Bhamidipati; Ravikanth; Dubbing Janaki; Girish Pradhan
- Cinematography: Kasthuri
- Edited by: G. G. Krishna Rao
- Music by: K. V. Mahadevan
- Production company: Jyothi Art Creations
- Release date: 26 June 1981
- Country: India
- Language: Telugu

Saptapadi (transl. Seven steps) is a 1981 Indian Telugu-language drama film written and directed by K. Viswanath. The film is not only about the seven steps that one takes during a Hindu wedding that symbolise the act of shedding bachelorhood and entering a more stable married state but also talks about an individual's journey breaking away from the shackles of conservatism to finding a path of understanding, encompassing and enlightenment.

Upon release, the film received widely positive reviews and won the National Film Award for Best Feature Film on National Integration, four state Nandi Awards, and the Filmfare Award for Best Telugu film. The film was featured retrospectively at the AISFM film festival. In 1984, Viswanath directed the Hindi version Jaag Utha Insan.

== Plot ==
Yajulu is a highly revered, orthodox Brahmin head priest who adheres strictly to religious rituals and traditional caste boundaries. His rigid convictions previously led him to ostracize his daughter, Janaki, for marrying outside their community. He lives with his son Avadhani, daughter-in-law Annapoorna, and grandson Gaurinadha, a devout and deeply respectful young man.

The late Janaki's daughter, Hema, a talented classical dancer, arrives in the village alongside her father to perform at the local temple. While Yajulu masks his affection with outward hostility due to his past resentment toward his late daughter's marriage. Hema harbors a secret: she is deeply in love with Haribabu, a brilliant flautist from a marginalized, lower-caste community. Haribabu regularly accompanies Hema's dance performances, and the two share a profound spiritual and artistic bond. However, acutely aware of the era's severe caste barriers, they keep their relationship hidden.

Oblivious to her love story, Yajulu arranges a marriage between Hema and Gaurinadha. Out of deep respect for her grandfather and fear of societal backlash, Hema suppresses her feelings and reluctantly consents. During the wedding ritual, specifically while walking the Saptapadi (the seven sacred steps), a distressed Hema hallucinates, seeing Haribabu in place of Gaurinadha.

Following the wedding, Gaurinadha attempts to consummate the marriage. However, whenever he approaches Hema intimately, his own deeply spiritual nature causes him to envision her as a manifestation of the protective goddess Durga. Recognizing this divine sign, Gaurinadha investigates and realizes that because Hema's heart and soul belong entirely to another man, she is a sacred entity to him rather than a wife. Resolute, Gaurinadha leaves the village to find Haribabu and reunite him with Hema.

When the truth comes to light, Avadhani and Annapoorna strongly condemn the situation. A deeply troubled Yajulu consults his close friend, Raju, a local zamindar, who challenges Yajulu's orthodox superstitions and urges him to look past rigid societal dogmas. This sparks a profound internal conflict within Yajulu. He realizes that forcing Hema to remain in a loveless marriage when her soul is devoted to another is a violation of dharma (true righteousness). He concludes that ritualistic vows are hollow without a true spiritual union.

Defying his lifelong conditioning and the inevitable wrath of the conservative village community, Yajulu declares Hema's marriage to Gaurinadha invalid in the eyes of true spirituality. When Gaurinadha returns to the village with Haribabu, Yajulu steps forward to dissolve the previous union and personally solemnizes the wedding between Hema and Haribabu. The film concludes with Yajulu facing total societal boycott, yet standing firm in his reformed conviction that humanity and genuine spiritual love transcend rigid caste barriers.

== Cast ==
- J. V. Somayajulu as Yajulu
- Allu Ramalingayya as Raju
- J. V. Ramana Murthy as Avadhani, Yajulu's son
- Dubbing Janaki as Annapurna, Avadhani's wife
- Ravikanth as Gaurinadha Sastry, Yajulu's grandson
- Bhamidipati Sabita as Hema, Yajulu's granddaughter
- Girish Pradhan as Haribabu
- Jhansi as Katyayani
- Prameela Rani as Karuna
- Sivaparvathi as Raju's daughter
- Sakshi Ranga Rao as Chayanulu
- Mallikarjuna Rao

== Production ==
While filming Sankarabharanam, Viswanath wanted to make a film on the institution of marriage and Saptapadi was born out of such an idea. The film's producer Bhimavaram Bucchi Reddy met Viswanath during the music sittings of Sankarabharanam and approached him to make a film for him.

The real-life brothers J. V. Somayajulu and J. V. Ramanamurthy were featured as father and son in this film. Reddy and Viswanath were scouting for actresses around six months and chose Alekhya for the role but since Viswanath did not find her suitable, he eventually chose debutant Sabita and this is the only film she acted in. The debutants Girish, then student of Madras Film Institute, portrayed Haribabu and Ravikanth, is a Telugu lecturer from Amalapuram, did the role of Viswanatha Sastry. Girish's dialogues were dubbed by Viswanath. Kasthuri, who assisted Balu Mahendra in Sankarabharanam was chosen as the film's cinematographer. Ravishankar, who went on to become an actor and voice artist, appeared as a child artist.

As Viswanath wanted a temple on the river banks with stairs going straight from the river to the temple, the set design team found a temple in Amaravathi which was being renovated for an event. In order to shoot there, the wall of the adjoining house and some of the temple walls were taken down in order to show the river. Filming was done in a single schedule of fifty five days while the song "Nemaliki Nerpina" was shot at Tummalapalli Kalakshestram in Vijayawada.

== Soundtrack ==
The film's soundtrack was composed by K. V. Mahadevan with lyrics by Veturi. The music was completed even before the film was started while the soundtrack was completed four months before the audio launch.

All music is composed by K. V. Mahadevan.

No.	Title	Lyrics	Singer(s)	Length
1.	"Akhilandeswari Chamundeswari"	Veturi	P. Susheela, S. P. Balasubrahmanyam
2.	"Ayigiri Nandini"	Adi Sankaracharya	S. P. Balasubrahmanyam
3.	"Bhamane Satyabhamane"	Veturi	S. Janaki
4.	"Govullu Tellana"	Veturi	S. Janaki, S. P. Balasubrahmanyam
5.	"Marugelara O Raghava"	Thyagaraja	S. Janaki
6.	"Nemaliki Nerpina Nadakalivi"	Veturi	S. Janaki
7.	"Om Jatavedase" (Sri Durga Suktam)		S. P. Balasubrahmanyam, S. Janaki
8.	"Vrepalliya Eda Jhalluna"	Veturi	P. Susheela, S. P. Balasubrahmanyam
9.	"Ye Kulamu Needante"	Veturi	S. P. Balasubrahmanyam, S. Janaki

== Awards ==
Year	Nominee / work	Award	Result
1981	K. Viswanath, B. Bucchireddy	National Film Award for Best Feature Film on National Integration	Won
1981	K. Viswanath	Nandi Award for Best Screenplay Writer	Won
1981	G. G. Krishna Rao	Nandi Award for Best Editor	Won
1981	Kasthuri	Nandi Award for Best Cinematographer	Won
1981	S. Janaki	Nandi Award for Best Female Playback Singer	Won
1981	B. Bucchireddy	Filmfare Award for Best Film – Telugu	Won

== Release ==
When the film was shown to the film circle, they found it artistic and disliked the climax. Despite this, the producer released this version in theatres. According to Reddy, the film was a decent hit.
