= Subhalekha Sudhakar =

Indian actor

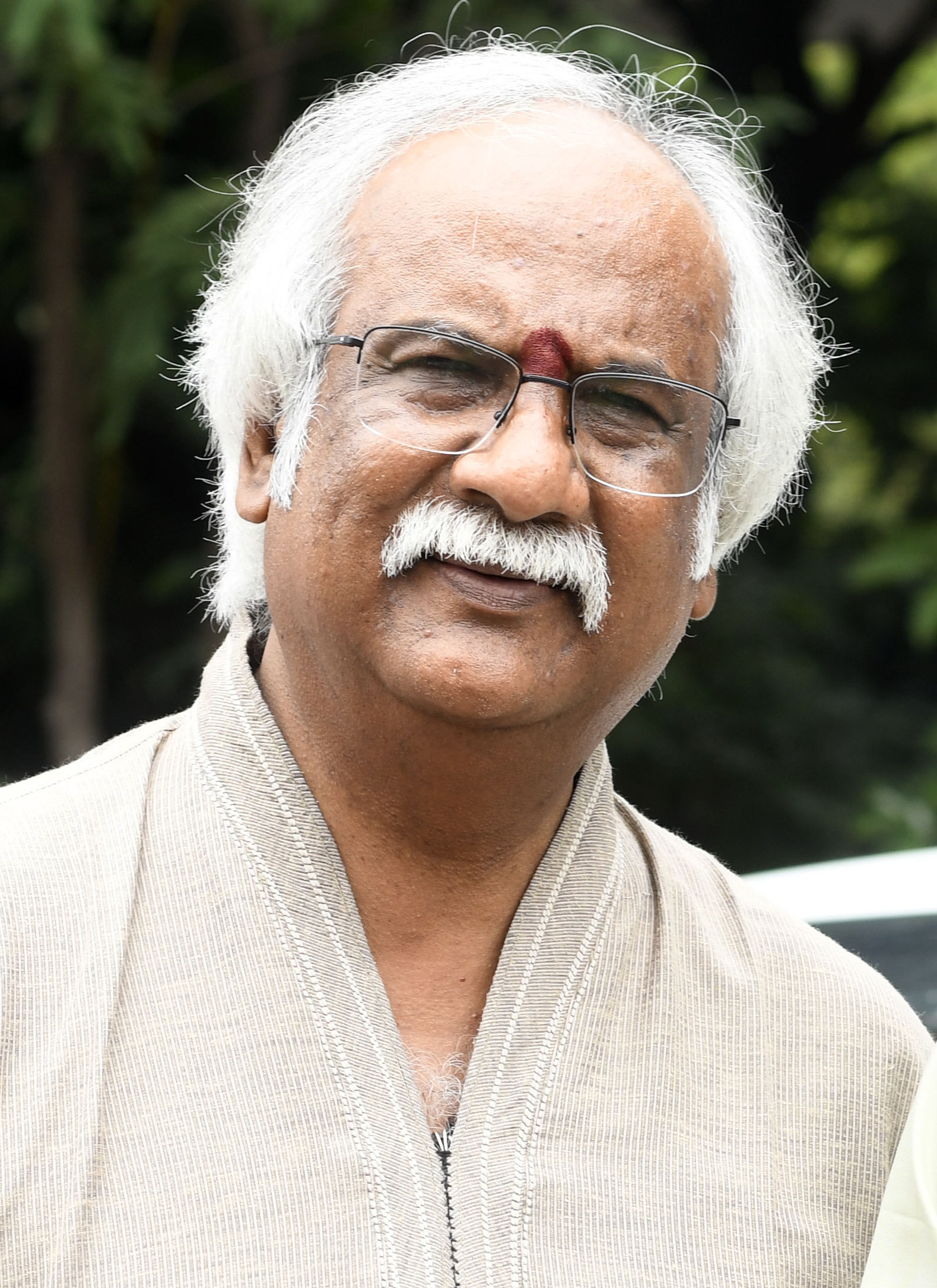
- Sudhakar in 2025
- Born: Suravajhala Sudhakar; 19 November 1960 (age 65); Anakapalli, Andhra Pradesh, India
- Occupations: Actor, voice actor
- Years active: 1982–present
- Works: Full list
- Spouse: S. P. Sailaja (m. 1989)
- Children: 1
- Relatives: S. P. Balasubrahmanyam (brother-in-law); S. P. Charan (nephew)

Suravajhala Sudhakar (born 19 November 1960), known by his stage name Subhalekha Sudhakar, is an Indian actor who worked in Telugu and Tamil language films. Sudhakar's first Telugu film Subhalekha (1982) gained him wide recognition through which he obtained his screen name. He went on to appear in a variety of roles in films such as Rendu Jella Sita (1983), Sitaara (1984), Aha Naa pellanta! (1987), Siva (1989), Prema Zindabad (1990), Nirnayam (1992), Chitram Bhalare Vichitram (1991), Nesam (1997), Dongaata (1997), Chinnabbayi (1997), and Aa Naluguru (2004), Aravinda Sametha Veera Raghava (2019), Masooda (2022), and Mad Square (2025)

Sudhakar has appeared in over 300 films in Telugu, in addition to a few in Tamil. Following his stint in cinema, he subsequently moved to television. Some of his notable television series in Tamil include Chithi, Kolangal, Thendral and Priyamanaval. He received the Nandi TV Award for the Telugu serial Mamathala Kovela. He also received an award for Thendral, in which he played the female protagonist's father.

== Early life and career ==
Sudhakar was born as Suravajhala Sudhakar on 19 November 1960. After his graduation, he moved to Madras to pursue a full time career in films.

He gave several auditions and was selected for K. Viswanath's film Subhalekha. He gained recognition among the Telugu audience with Subhalekha, thereby gaining his screen name "Subhalekha" Sudhakar.

He is noted for his comical and supporting actor roles in films.

== Personal life ==
He married playback singer S. P. Sailaja, sister of noted singer and actor S. P. Balasubrahmanyam, in December 1989, and the couple has a son.
