= K. Viswanath =

Indian director, screenwriter, and actor (1930–2023)

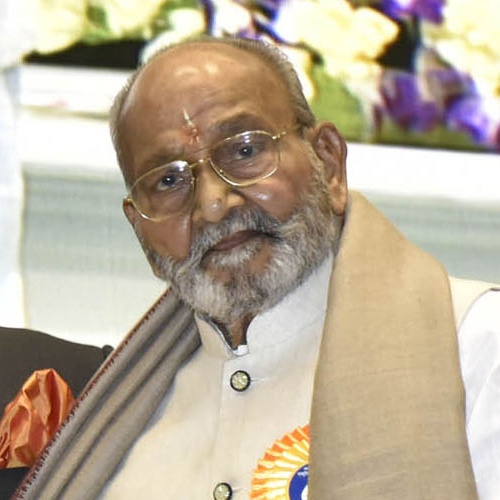
- K. Vishwanath at the National Film Awards Function, 2017
- Born: Kasinadhuni Viswanath; 19 February 1930; Repalle, Madras Presidency, British India (now in Andhra Pradesh, India)
- Died: 2 February 2023 (aged 92); Hyderabad, Telangana, India
- Occupations: Film director; Screenwriter; Actor; Lyricist
- Years active: 1951–2023
- Works: Full list
- Awards: Padma Shri (1992); Dadasaheb Phalke Award (2016)

Kasinadhuni Viswanath (19 February 1930 – 2 February 2023) was an Indian film director, screenwriter, lyricist and actor who predominantly worked in Telugu cinema, he received recognition for his works, and is known for blending parallel cinema with mainstream cinema. (Note: Attributed to multiple sources:) He was honoured with the "Prize of the Public" at the "Besançon Film Festival of France" in 1981. In 1992, he received the Andhra Pradesh state Raghupathi Venkaiah Award, and the civilian honour Padma Shri for his contribution to the field of arts. In 2016, he was conferred with the Dadasaheb Phalke Award, the highest award in Indian cinema. He is popularly known as "Kalatapasvi."

Viswanath started his film career as an audiographer and over sixty years, he directed 53 feature films in a variety of genres, including central themes based on performing arts, visual arts, aesthetics, melodrama, and poetry. Viswanath's filmography is known for addressing the issues of discrimination and socio-economic challenges through liberal arts medium.

Viswanath's classic blockbusters Sankarabharanam (1980) and Sagara Sangamam (1983) were featured among CNN-IBN's 100 greatest Indian films of all time. His directorial works Sankarabharanam and Saptapadi (1981) fetched the National Film Awards for Best Popular Film for Providing Wholesome Entertainment and Best Feature Film on National Integration, respectively. Sankarabharanam, was featured at the 8th IFFI, the Tashkent Film Festival, the Moscow International Film Festival, and the Besançon Film Festival.

Viswanath's Swathi Muthyam (1986) was India's official entry to the 59th Academy Awards. Swathi Muthyam, Sagara Sangamam and Sirivennela (1986), were featured at the Asia-Pacific Film Festival. Swayamkrushi (1987) was screened to special mention at the Moscow International Film Festival. Sankarabharanam, Sagara Sangamam, Sruthilayalu (1987), Swarnakamalam (1988), and Swathi Kiranam (1992) were featured in the Indian Panorama sections of IFFI, Ann Arbor Film Festival, and AISFM Film Festival respectively.

Viswanath was a recipient of five National Film Awards, seven state Nandi Awards, ten Filmfare Awards South, and a Filmfare Award in Hindi. His directorial works which are produced by Poornodaya Movie Creations were screened to special mention at the Moscow International Film Festival; such films were dubbed into Russian language and have been theatrically released in Moscow.

== Early life ==
Viswanath was born on 19 February 1930 in a Telugu family to Kasinadhuni Subramanyam and Kasinadhuni Saraswathy (Saraswathamma) in Repalle of Guntur district, Andhra Pradesh. His ancestral roots come from Pedapulivarru, Andhra Pradesh, a small village on the banks of River Krishna. Viswanath studied Intermediate from Guntur Hindu College, and holds a BSc degree from Andhra Christian College of Andhra University. He began his career as a sound recordist at Vauhini Studios in Madras, where his father was an associate. There, he apprenticed under the guidance of A Krishnan, who was the Head of Sound Engineering at Vauhini. Viswanath and A Krishnan developed a close rapport and later after the former made the transition into film direction, he would always bounce ideas off the latter. Viswanath made his entry into film direction at Annapurna Pictures under Adurthi Subba Rao and K. Ramnoth. He wished to work as an assistant to director K. Balachander and Bapu.

== Career ==
During his early career, Viswanath was associated with Adurthi Subba Rao on National Award-winning films such as Mooga Manasulu (1964) and Doctor Chakravarty (1964). Viswanath scripted Sudigundalu (1968), and directed works such as Aatma Gowravam (1965), O Seeta Katha (1974) and Jeevana Jyothi (1975) which garnered the state Nandi Awards, and were screened at the Asian and African film Festival at Tashkent.

In 1951 he started as an assistant director in the Telugu-Tamil Film Pathala Bhairavi (1951). In 1965, Viswanath debuted as a director with Telugu film Aatma Gowravam (1965), which won the Nandi Award for Best Feature Film of the year. Viswanath followed it up with drama films Chelleli Kapuram (1971), Sarada (1973), O Seeta Katha (1974) and Jeevana Jyoti (1975) which are women-centric films. It was in Siri Siri Muvva (1976) that the artistic touch in his craft first became visible.

Sankarabharanam (1980) highlights the neglect of traditional Indian music under the increasing influence of western music. The film brings out the grandeur of Carnatic music, the traditional South Indian music towards the end. Bhaskaran, a media and film researcher from Chennai has documented, in his study of South Indian music culture, how Sankarabharanam contributed to the revival of Carnatic music in a big way. The film broke many commercial records by running for over one year in cinemas. In a recent study published in Journal of Dance, Movements & Spiritualities published by "Intellect Group" of the United Kingdom, C. S. H. N. Murthy, a media and film studies scholar from India, has demonstrated how Viswanath's filmography embraces a wide spectrum of characters that include mentally and physically challenged subjects as well, like the film Sarada (1973), which exploits a psychologically deranged woman, Swathi Muthyam (1986), which exploits a cognitively disabled man's humanism, Sirivennela (1986) which revels in situations between deaf and dumb characters, and Kalam Marindi (1972), which dwells on characters stuck in a caste-based society.

Film researcher, C. S. H. N. Murthy observed that Viswanath's films offer a pathway towards inclusiveness, affecting positive spiritual change at both personal and social levels. Situating the content in the broad arena of de-westernizing media studies, through immersive and culturally embedded perspectives, Murthy endeavoured to offer modern and postmodern dimensions in Viswanath's films.

=== Films with social issues ===
Viswanath has made many films dealing with a wide range of human and social issues: Saptapadi, Sirivennela, Sutradharulu, Subhalekha, Sruthilayalu, Subha Sankalpam, Aapadbandhavudu, Swayam Krushi, and Swarnakamalam have lead characters representing different strata of society, meticulously etched to suit the larger picture.

In Saptapadi, he decries the evils of untouchability and the caste system. In Subhodayam and Swayam Krushi he emphasizes the dignity and respectability of manual labor. In Subhalekha, he deals, in a humorous way, with the dowry system – one of the major evils in today's society. While Sutradharulu urges present-day society to recognize the need to adopt the ideals of non-violence, Swati Kiranam depicts the harm that can be caused by the basic instincts of envy and anger in a man, however accomplished he may be.

In spite of the nature of these subjects, they are presented in a subtle manner with an imaginative storyline, with just the right amount of emphasis on the intended message. He was a director with a social-conscious mind and who believed cinema could bring out desirable changes in society if presented in a format liked by a cross-section of audience.

=== Association with Poornodaya Creations ===
Edida Nageswara Rao founded "Poornodaya Movie Creations", which encouraged Viswanath to make aesthetic films. Poornodaya has produced several of Viswanath's films like Sankarabharanam, Swatimutyam, Saagarasangamam, Sutradharulu, and Aapadbandhavudu. Most of these films were dubbed into Russian and were screened at the Moscow Film Festival.

=== Hindi cinema ===
Viswanath has also directed Hindi language films such as Sargam (1979), Kaamchor (1982), Shubh Kaamna (1983), Jaag Utha Insan (1984), Sur Sangam (1985), Sanjog (1985), Eeshwar (1989), Sangeet (1992) and Dhanwan (1993). Some of these films (especially his collaboration with actress Jaya Prada) have been super hits at the box office.

=== Acting ===
In 1995, Viswanath debuted as an actor with Telugu film Subha Sankalpam. As a character actor, he has appeared in works such as Vajram (1995), Kalisundam Raa (2000), Narasimha Naidu (2001), Nuvvu Leka Nenu Lenu (2002), Santosham (2002), Seema Simham (2002), Tagore (2003), Lakshmi Narasimha (2004), Swarabhishekam (2004), Aadavari Matalaku Arthale Verule (2007), Athadu (2005), and Pandurangadu (2008), and Devasthanam (2012). He essayed characters in Tamil works such as Kuruthipunal (1995), Mugavaree (1999), Kakkai Siraginilae (2000), Bagavathi (2002), Pudhiya Geethai (2003), Yaaradi Nee Mohini (2008), Rajapattai (2011), Singam II (2013), Lingaa (2014) and Uttama Villain (2015).

=== Television ===
Viswanath had also acted in a few television serials; Siva Narayana Teertha on SVBC TV, Chellamay on Sun TV, and Suryiavamsam on Vendhar TV. He also endorsed brands such as GRT Jewellers and appeared in television commercials.

=== Biopic ===
Viswadarshanam is an official biopic of K Viswanath, written and directed by Janardhana Maharshi, which tells the story of a 90-year-old acclaimed director. The film was telecast on ETV (Telugu) on 19 February 2023, his 93rd birthday.

== Personal life and death ==
Viswanath was married to Kasinadhuni Jayalakshmi. Actor Chandra Mohan, and singers S. P. Balasubrahmanyam and S. P. Sailaja were his cousins.

Viswanath died on 2 February 2023, aged 92, in a private hospital in Hyderabad due to age-related issues.

== Filmography ==
=== As director and screenwriter ===
Directed and screenwritten features
Year	Title	Director	Story	Screenwriter	Language	Notes
1963	Chaduvukunna Ammayilu	No	No	Yes	Telugu	
1965	Aatma Gowravam	Yes	No	Yes	Telugu	Nandi Award for Best Feature Film (Bronze); Debut as a director
1967	Private Master	Yes	No	Yes	Telugu	
1968	Sudigundalu	No	No	Yes	Telugu	National Film Award for Best Feature Film in Telugu; Nandi Award for Best Feature Film (Gold); Filmfare Award for Best Film – Telugu; Tashkent Film Festival
1968	Kalisochina Adrushtam	Yes	No	Yes	Telugu	Also Dialogue Writer
1968	Undamma Bottu Pedata	Yes	No	No	Telugu	
1969	Nindu Hrudayalu	Yes	No	Yes	Telugu	
1970	Maro Prapancham	No	No	Yes	Telugu	
1971	Chelleli Kapuram	Yes	No	No	Telugu	Nandi Award for Best Feature Film (Gold)
1971	Chinnanati Snehitulu	Yes	Yes	Yes	Telugu	
1971	Nindu Dampathulu	Yes	Yes	Yes	Telugu	
1972	Kalam Marindi	Yes	Yes	Yes	Telugu	Nandi Award for Best Feature Film (Gold)
1973	Neramu Siksha	Yes	No	Yes	Telugu	
1973	Sarada	Yes	No	No	Telugu	Nandi Award for Best Feature Film (Gold)
1974	Amma Manasu	Yes	Yes	Yes	Telugu	
1974	O Seeta Katha	Yes	No	No	Telugu	Nandi Award for Best Feature Film (Silver); Filmfare Award for Best Film – Telugu; Filmfare Award for Best Direction
1975	Chinnanati Kalalu	Yes	No	No	Telugu	
1975	Jeevana Jyothi	Yes	No	No	Telugu	Nandi Award for Best Feature Film (Gold); Filmfare Award for Best Film – Telugu; Filmfare Award for Best Direction
1976	Mangalyaniki Maromudi	Yes	No	Yes	Telugu	
1976	Siri Siri Muvva	Yes	Yes	Yes	Telugu	
1976	Prema Bandham	Yes	No	No	Telugu	
1976	Jeevitha Nouka	Yes	No	No	Telugu	
1978	Kalanthakulu	Yes	No	No	Telugu	
1978	Seetamalakshmi	Yes	Yes	Yes	Telugu	
1979	President Peramma	Yes	No	No	Telugu	
1979	Sargam	Yes	Yes	Yes	Hindi	Remake of Siri Siri Muvva
1980	Sankarabharanam	Yes	Yes	Yes	Telugu	Prize of the Public at the Besançon Film Festival of France; Special Mention – Moscow International Film Festival; National Film Award for Best Popular Film Providing Wholesome Entertainment; Nandi Award for Best Feature Film (Gold)
1980	Alludu Pattina Bharatam	Yes	Yes	Yes	Telugu	
1980	Subhodayam	Yes	Yes	Yes	Telugu	
1981	Saptapadi	Yes	Yes	Yes	Telugu	Special Mention – Moscow International Film Festival; National Film Award for Best Feature Film on National Integration; Nandi Award for Best Screenplay; Filmfare Award for Best Film – Telugu
1982	Kaamchor	Yes	Yes	Yes	Hindi	Remake of Subhodayam
1982	Subhalekha	Yes	Yes	Yes	Telugu	Filmfare Award for Best Direction
1983	Sagara Sangamam	Yes	Yes	Yes	Telugu	Nandi Award for Best Feature Film (Bronze); Filmfare Award for Best Direction; Dubbed into Tamil as Salangai Oli
1983	Shubh Kaamna	Yes	Yes	Yes	Hindi	Remake of Subhalekha
1984	Janani Janmabhoomi	Yes	Yes	Yes	Telugu	
1984	Jaag Utha Insan	Yes	Yes	Yes	Hindi	Remake of Saptapadi
1985	Sanjog	Yes	No	Yes	Hindi	Remake of Jeevana Jyothi
1985	Sur Sangam	Yes	Yes	Yes	Hindi	Remake of Sankarabharanam
1985	Swathi Muthyam	Yes	Yes	Yes	Telugu	India's Official Entry for Best Foreign Language film at the 59th Academy Awards; National Film Award for Best Feature Film in Telugu; Nandi Award for Best Feature Film (Gold); Nandi Award for Best Direction; Filmfare Award for Best Direction; Special Mention – Asia Pacific Film Festival; Special Mention – Moscow International Film Festival/ Also Lyricist
1986	Sirivennela	Yes	Yes	Yes	Telugu	
1987	Sruthilayalu	Yes	Yes	Yes	Telugu	Nandi Award for Best Feature Film (Gold); Nandi Award for Best Direction; Filmfare Award for Best Direction
1987	Swayamkrushi	Yes	Yes	Yes	Telugu	Special Mention – Moscow International Film Festival
1988	Swarnakamalam	Yes	Yes	Yes	Telugu	Nandi Award for Best Feature Film (Gold); Filmfare Award for Best Film – Telugu; Cinema Express Award for Best Direction; Ann Arbor Film Festival
1989	Eeshwar	Yes	Yes	Yes	Hindi	Remake of Swathi Muthyam; Filmfare Award for Best Story
1989	Sutradharulu	Yes	Yes	Yes	Telugu	National Film Award for Best Feature Film in Telugu; Nandi Award for Best Feature Film (Bronze)
1992	Swathi Kiranam	Yes	Yes	Yes	Telugu	
1992	Sangeet	Yes	Yes	Yes	Telugu	
1992	Aapadbandhavudu	Yes	Yes	Yes	Telugu	Nandi Award for Best Feature Film (Bronze); Filmfare Award for Best Direction
1993	Dhanwaan	Yes	No	Yes	Telugu	
1995	Subha Sankalpam	Yes	Yes	Yes	Telugu	Filmfare Award for Best Direction
1996	Aurat Aurat Aurat	Yes	No	No	Telugu	
1997	Chinnabbayi	Yes	Yes	Yes	Telugu	
2004	Swarabhishekam	Yes	Yes	Yes	Telugu	50th film; also lyricist National Film Award for Best Feature Film in Telugu
2010	Subhapradam	Yes	Yes	Yes	Telugu	Last Film as a director

=== As an actor ===
Year	Film	Role	Language	Notes
1981	Saptapadi	—N/a	Telugu	Dubbing artiste for Girish Pradhan
1995	Subha Sankalpam	Raayudu	Telugu	Debut as an actor
1995	Kuruthipunal	Srinivasan	Tamil	
1995	Vajram	Chakri's father	Telugu	
1996	Drohi	Srinivasan	Telugu	
1999	Mugavaree	Sridhar's father	Tamil	
2000	Kalisundam Raa	Raghavayya	Telugu	
2000	Manasu Paddanu Kaani	Venu's father	Telugu	
2000	Kakkai Siraginilae	Sambasiva Iyer	Tamil	
2001	Narasimha Naidu	Raghupathi Naidu	Telugu	
2001	Chinna	Governor	Telugu	
2002	Seema Simham	Visweswara Rao	Telugu	
2002	Nuvvu Leka Nenu Lenu	Ramachandrayya	Telugu	
2002	Santosham	Ramachandrayya	Telugu	
2002	Lahiri Lahiri Lahirilo	Balaramayya Naidu	Telugu	
2002	Kuchi Kuchi Koonamma	Sai's grandfather	Telugu	
2002	Bagavathi	Chief Minister	Tamil	
2003	Pudhiya Geethai	Swamy	Tamil	Cameo appearance
2003	Tagore	Chief Minister	Telugu	
2004	Lakshmi Narasimha	Lakshmi Narasimha's father	Telugu	
2004	Swarabhishekam	Srinivasachari	Telugu	
2005	Athadu	CBI Officer	Telugu	Cameo appearance
2005	Andhrudu	Sangeetham Teacher/Surendra's father	Telugu	
2006	Valliddari Vayasu Padahare	Judge	Telugu	Cameo appearance
2007	Aadavari Matalaku Arthale Verule	Keerti's grandfather	Telugu	
2008	Yaaradi Nee Mohini	Keerti's grandfather	Tamil	
2008	Pandurangadu	Pandurangadu's father	Telugu	
2008	Black & White	President of India	Telugu	
2011	Mr. Perfect	Maggie's grandfather	Telugu	
2011	Rajapattai	Dakshanamurthy	Tamil	
2012	Devasthanam	Srimannarayana	Telugu	
2013	Singam II	Chief Minister	Tamil	
2014	Lingaa	Karunakara	Tamil	
2015	Uttama Villain	Poornachandra Rao	Tamil	
2016	Hyper	Chief Minister	Telugu	
2018	Prema Baraha	Seenu	Kannada	Bilingual film
2018	Sollividava	Seenu	Tamil	Bilingual film
2019	Viswadarshanam		Telugu	
2022	Oppanda	Rangaswamy	Kannada	Last film as an actor

=== Other roles ===
Year	Film	Language	Credits	Ref.
1951	Pathala Bhairavi	Telugu; Tamil	Assistant director	
1957	Thodi Kodallu	Telugu	Audiographer	
1957	Enga Veetu Mahalakshmi	Tamil	Audiographer	
1959	Banda Ramudu	Telugu	Audiographer	
1961	Iddaru Mitrulu	Telugu	Assistant director	
1964	Mooga Manasulu	Telugu	Assistant director	
1964	Doctor Chakravarty	Telugu	Assistant director	

== Awards ==
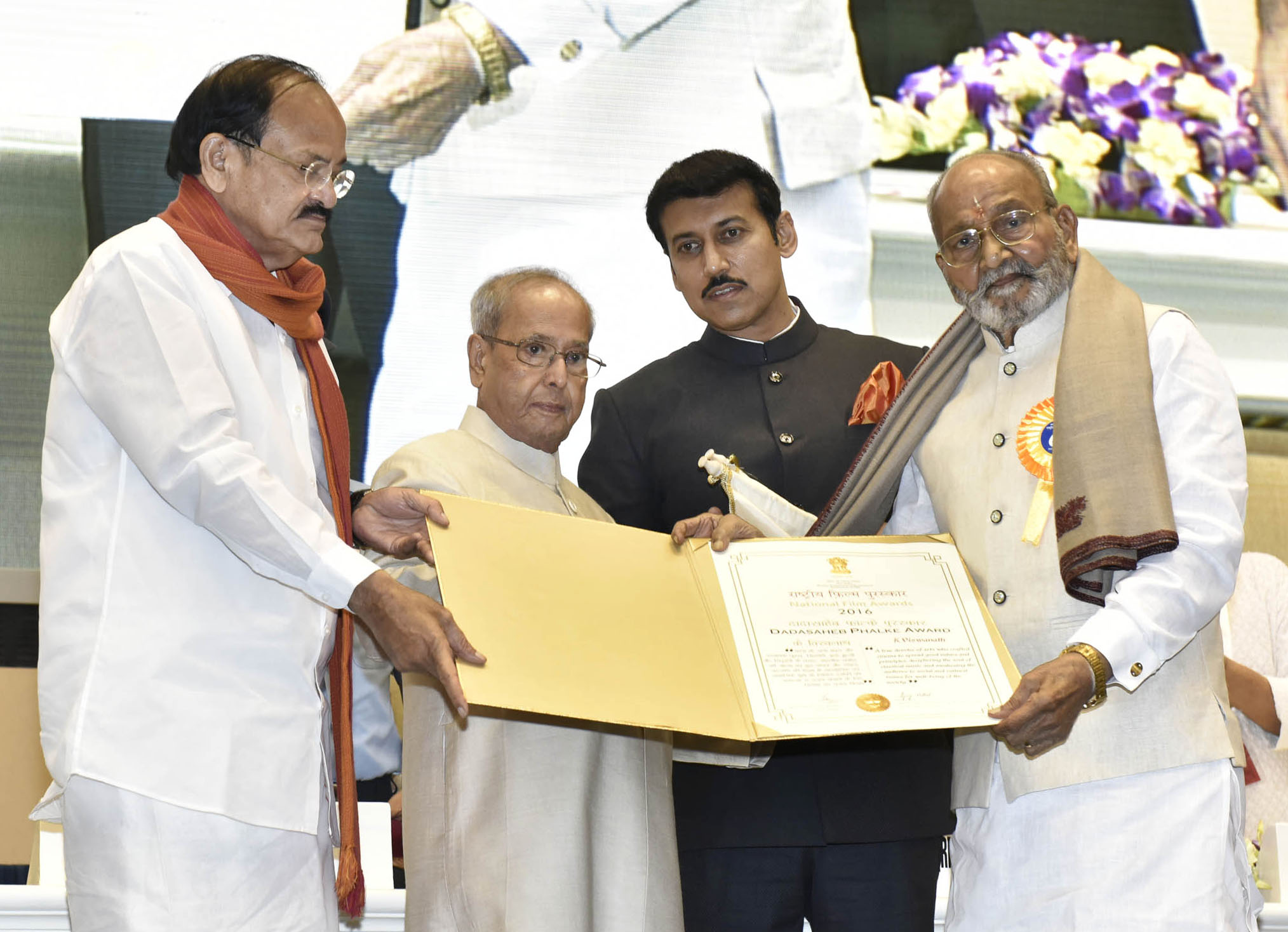
President Mukherjee presenting the Dadasaheb Phalke Award to Sh. Vishwanath at the 64th National Film Awards on 3 May 2017.

Year	Award	Notes
1992	Padma Shri Government of India	
1981	Prize of the Public at the Besançon Film Festival of France	
1982–87	Special Mention – Moscow International Film Festival	
2014	Gulf Andhra Award for Life Time Achievement in Cinema – U.A.E.	
2016	Dadasaheb Phalke Award for lifetime achievement in cinema.	
1986	India's official entry to the 59th Academy Awards - Swathi Muthyam	
1980	National Film Award for Best Popular Film Providing Wholesome Entertainment – Sankarabharanam	
1982	Nargis Dutt Award for Best Feature Film on National Integration – Saptapadi	
2013	CNN-IBNs List of the 100 Greatest Indian Films of All Time - Sankarabharanam and Sagara Sangamam	
1987	Best Feature Film in Telugu – Swathi Muthyam	
1990	Best Feature Film in Telugu – Sutradharulu	
2005	Best Feature Film in Telugu – Swarabhishekam	
1980	Second Best Story Writer - Sankarabharanam	
1981	Best Screenplay Writer – Saptapadi	
1982	Best Story Writer - Subhalekha	
1986	Best Director – Swathi Muthyam	
1987	Best Director – Sruthilayalu	
1992	Raghupathi Venkaiah Award – Lifetime achievement for outstanding contributions to Telugu cinema	
1995	Best Character Actor – Subha Sankalpam	
2000	Best Supporting Actor – Kalisundam Raa	
1988	Cinema Express Award for Best Director – Swarnakamalam	
2008	CineMAA Award for lifetime achievement	
2022	2021: Lifetime Achievement Award	
1989	Filmfare Best Story Award – Eeshwar	
1974	Best Director – O Seeta Katha	
1975	Best Director – Jeevana Jyoti	
1982	Best Director – Subhalekha	
1983	Best Director - Sagara Sangamam	
1986	Best Director – Swathi Muthyam	
1987	Best Director – Sruthilayalu	
1992	Best Director – Aapadbandhavudu	
1995	Best Director – Subha Sankalpam	
1994	Lifetime Achievement	

Honorary doctorate

- Potti Sreeramulu Telugu University

=== Other honours ===
Year	Award	Notes
2012	Viswa Vikhyata Darsaka Sarvabhowma for achievement in direction.	
2012	Chittoor V. Nagayya Puraskaram for lifetime achievement in cinema.	
2017	Film Nagar Cultural Center – Hyderabad Award for achievement in cinema.	
2017	Telugu Film Director's Association Award for achievement in direction	
2017	Aathmeeya Sanmanam from Government of Andhra Pradesh for achievement in cinema at Vijayawada Thummalapalli Kalakshetram	
