= Aadi Lakshmi =

- DVD cover
- Directed by: R. Suresh Varma
- Written by: R. Suresh Varma; Marudhuri Raja (dialogues)
- Produced by: Y. Suresh
- Starring: Srikanth; Vadde Naveen; Sridevi
- Cinematography: Bhoopathy
- Edited by: Gautham Raju
- Music by: Chakri
- Production company: Viswak Movies
- Release date: 8 December 2006
- Country: India
- Language: Telugu

Aadi Lakshmi is a 2006 Indian Telugu language romantic thriller film directed by R. Suresh Varma. It starred Srikanth, Vadde Naveen and Sridevi. The film is a remake of the Hindi film Deewangee (2002).

== Cast ==
- Srikanth as Aadi / Shankar
- Vadde Naveen as Lakshmi Prasad
- Sridevi as Surekha
- Poornima as Poornima
- Babloo Prithiveeraj
- Sudha as Lakshmi Prasad
- Nutan Prasad as Judge
- Mallikarjuna Rao as Malli
- Naramalli Sivaprasad
- Sivaji Raja as police inspector
- Ali
- Uttej as police constable
- Abhinayasri as police inspector
- Jenny as doctor
- Vijaya Ranga Raju as doctor
- Raghunatha Reddy
- Kadambari Kiran
- Sana
- Raghu Babu
- Lakshmipati
- Tirupathi Prakash
- Chakri (Cameo appearance)

== Production ==
The film is directed by R. V. Suresh, who previously directed Sivayya and Manasichi Choodu with Vadde Naveen under the name of Suresh Varma. The hospital scenes were shot at the Nanakramguda Cine Village, Hyderabad and the climax was shot at the Stock Market in Somajiguda, Hyderabad.

== Soundtrack ==
The music is composed by Chakri.

- "Love U Lolly Pop" – Chakri, Kousalya
- "Naa Cell Phone" – Kousalya, Ravi Verma
- "Intakalamu" – Venu, Sudha
- "Dole Dole" – Ranjith, Suchitra
- "Rojuko Muddu" – Shreya Ghoshal
- "Jil Jil Prema" – Vedala Hemachandra, Kousalya

== Reception ==
Kishore from Nowrunning opined that "The plot is good. But possessiveness of Srikanth could have been shown more vividly. There are a few loose ends like Vadde Naveen getting away from an accident scratch free. He [sic] climax could have been made more interesting". Film critic B. Anuradha opined that "His [R. V. Suresh's] disjointed and repetitive screenplay dilutes the interesting point, over which he perhaps wanted to provoke a discussion" but praised Srikanth's performance.
