= Taj Mahal (1995 film) =

1995 Indian Telugu-language film

- DVD cover
- Directed by: Muppalaneni Shiva
- Screenplay by: Muppalaneni Shiva
- Story by: Muppalaneni Shiva
- Dialogue by: Jandhyala
- Produced by: D. Ramanaidu
- Starring: Srikanth; Monica Bedi; Sanghavi
- Cinematography: Chota K. Naidu
- Edited by: K. Madhava; Marthand K. Venkatesh
- Music by: M. M. Srilekha
- Production company: Suresh Productions
- Distributed by: Suresh Productions
- Release date: 25 May 1995
- Running time: 138 minutes
- Country: India
- Language: Telugu

Taj Mahal is a 1995 Telugu-language romance film directed by Muppalaneni Shiva and produced by D. Ramanaidu. The film stars Srikanth, Monica Bedi and Sanghavi. The music was composed by M. M. Srilekha. It is the first successful film for Srikanth as a lead actor and the debut film of noted lyricist Chandrabose.

== Plot ==
The film revolves around the love story of Amar (Srikanth), a wealthy young man, and Mumtaz (Monica Bedi), a girl who sells miniature Taj Mahal models in Agra. Amar, on a trip with his friends, falls head over heels for Mumtaz's charm and innocence. Their whirlwind romance blossoms amidst the backdrop of the majestic Taj Mahal.

However, their path to love is filled with obstacles. Amar's family disapproves of their relationship due to their different social backgrounds. Mumtaz's brother, fearing for her safety, also tries to keep them apart. To make matters worse, Mumtaz discovers a shocking truth about her past that throws her life into turmoil.

== Cast ==
- Srikanth as Amar
- Monica Bedi as Mumtaz
- Sanghavi as Rekha, Chakravarthy's Daughter
- Srihari as Emraan Bhai, Mumtaz's Brother
- Ranganath as Phaneendra, Amar's Father
- Kota Srinivasa Rao as Chakravarthy
- Tanikella Bharani as SI Prakash
- Nutan Prasad as Amar's Grandfather
- Sudha as Vasundhara, Amar's Mother
- Brahmanandam as Driver Veerababu
- Babu Mohan as Kurmam
- Sudhakar as Devadas/Beggar
- Banerjee as Prabhu, Amar's Friend
- Ananth Babu as Ananth, Amar's Friend
- Achyuth as Raja
- D. Ramanaidu as himself

== Soundtrack ==
Taj Mahal

Soundtrack album by M. M. Srilekha
- Released: 2010
- Genre: Soundtrack
- Length: 27:12
- Label: Suresh Productions
- Producer: M. M. Srilekha

M. M. Srilekha chronology
Kondapalli Ratayya (1995)	Taj Mahal (1995)	Oho Naa Pellanta (1996)

The music for the film was composed by M. M. Srilekha . Lyrics were written by C. Narayana Reddy, Chandra Bose, Sirivennela Sitarama Sastry, Bhuvana Chandra.

Track listing
No.	Title	Lyrics	Singer(s)	Length
1.	"Chik Lik Chik Lik"	Sirivennela Sitarama Sastry	S. P. Balasubrahmanyam, K. S. Chithra	4:24
2.	"O Kala Kannadi"	Sirivennela Sitarama Sastry	S. P. Balasubrahmanyam, K. S. Chithra	4:12
3.	"Jum Jum Antoo"	C. Narayana Reddy	S. P. Balasubrahmanyam, K. S. Chithra	4:45
4.	"Pelli Pellantu"	Sirivennela Sitarama Sastry	S. P. Balasubrahmanyam, K. S. Chithra	4:34
5.	"Saagipoye Neeli Megham"	Bhuvana Chandra	S. P. Balasubrahmanyam, K. S. Chithra	4:37
6.	"Manchu kondallona"	Chandra Bose	S. P. Balasubrahmanyam, K. S. Chithra	4:40
Total length:				27:12

== Awards ==
- Nandi Award for Best Villain - Srihari
