= Tapana =

Tapana may refer to:

- Tapana, a hell in Naraka (Hinduism)
- Tapana, a hell in Naraka (Buddhism)
- Tapana (film), a 2004 Telugu romantic-drama film
- Tapana, an island in the Vava'u group, Tonga
