= Maa Pelliki Randi =

2000 film by Muppalaneni Shiva

- Poster
- Directed by: Muppalaneni Shiva
- Story by: Suraj
- Based on: Unakkaga Ellam Unakkaga (Tamil)
- Produced by: N R Anuradha Devi; Jasthi Phanindra Kumar
- Starring: J. D. Chakravarthy; Sakshi Sivanand
- Edited by: Shankar
- Music by: S. A. Rajkumar
- Production company: Kalpana Films
- Release date: 14 July 2000
- Country: India
- Language: Telugu

Maa Pelliki Randi (transl. Come to my marriage!) is a 2000 Indian Telugu-language drama film, starring J. D. Chakravarthy and Sakshi Sivanand, the film had a good run upon release. It is a remake of the 1999 Tamil film Unakkaga Ellam Unakkaga, directed by Sundar C.

== Cast ==
- J. D. Chakravarthy as Kumar
- Sakshi Sivanand as Anjali
- Kota Srinivasa Rao
- Chandra Mohan as Anjali's father
- Nagesh as Papa Rayudu
- AVS as Apparao
- Brahmanandam
- Sudhakar as Rambabu
- Gautham Raju
- Jenny
- Venu Madhav

== Production ==
The film marks the second collaboration between the director and producer after Priya O Priya. The film's title was changed from 'Maa Pelli Sandadi' to 'Maa Pelliki Randi' . The film was supposed to release in April 2000, but was delayed to 14 July 2000.

== Soundtrack ==
Music by S. A. Rajkumar, who preiovusly worked with the director for Raja (1999).

- "Nee Kosam" - Rajesh, K. S. Chithra
- "Hello Chalaki" - Mano, K. S. Chithra
- "Nuvve Naaku" - Rajesh, Chithra
- "Mama Chandamama" - P. Unnikrishnan, K. S. Chithra

== Reception ==
The Full Hyderabad wrote that "Even with all these drawbacks the movie is worth a watch for the laughs, if not for anything else". Indiainfo wrote "The oft-repeated story has nothing new and the treatment also is not very innovative. But, thankfully the script sans vulgarity. Some of the comedy scenes in the film test one’s patience and fail to evoke even a smile". Andhra Today wrote "Generally love themes are successful only when they have some novelty in them. But this movie boasting of no such credit fails in various departments. A hackneyed story and sequences, further jeopardized by insipid comedy leave little room for appreciation for the movie".
