= Naa Hrudayamlo Nidurinche Cheli =

- DVD cover
- Directed by: AVS Aadinarayana
- Written by: AVS Aadinarayana
- Produced by: Burugapalli S. S. Babu; Burugapalli Bapiraju (presenter)
- Starring: Naveen; Laila
- Cinematography: K. S. Selvaraj
- Edited by: Marthand K. Venkatesh
- Music by: Sri
- Production company: Venkata Ramana Creations
- Release date: 11 June 1999
- Country: India
- Language: Telugu

Naa Hrudayamlo Nidurinche Cheli (transl. The lover who resides in my heart) is a 1999 Indian Telugu-language psychological romantic drama film directed by AVS Aadinarayana and starring Naveen and Laila.

== Plot ==
Bujji falls in love with Mini over the phone and Mini has no idea who he is. Mini has a incurable disease and Bujji lies that he has the same disease and has a cure for it. After Mini's condition becomes serious, Bujji attempts suicide since he is deeply in love with her. How he cures Mini's disease with his love forms the rest of the story.

== Cast ==
- Naveen as Bujji
- Laila as Mini
- Chalapathi Rao as Bujji's father
- Sudha as Bujji's mother
- Sudhakar as P. K.
- Chakravarthy as Malik
- Rama Prabha as Malik's wife
- Babu Mohan
- C. V. L. Narasimha Rao as Mini's father
- Ali
- Venu Madhav as Bujji's friend
- Rajitha as Mini's mother
- Kallu Chidambaram
- Bandla Ganesh as Bujji's friend
- Ananth
- Baby Zeeba

== Soundtrack ==
The music was composed by Sri. The lyrics were written by Chandrabose and Vennelakanti. During the film's audio promotion, a notepad with love quotes was given free with each audio cassette.

Track listing
No.	Title	Singer(s)	Length
1.	"Naa Hrudayamlo Nidurinche Cheli"	S. P. Balasubrahmanyam	4:52
2.	"Speed Speed"	Yugi, Anuradha Sriram	4:35
3.	"Aayo Aayo"	Mano, Smita	4:50
4.	"O Cheli Nanu Veedi Poke"	Rajesh	3:51
5.	"Ninne Premincha"	Mano, K. S. Chithra	4:38
6.	"Hollywood Lady"	Rajesh, Sharada	4:58
Total length:			27:44

== Reception ==
A critic from Sify wrote, "Performance from Naveen and Laila looks convincing and realistic. The strong point is the film’s musical score, which may bring in repeat audience". A critic from Zamin Ryot noted, "The journey was smooth but the end was despicable".
