= Bujji Ila Raa =

- Directed by: Garudavega Anji
- Written by: G. Nageswara Reddy
- Produced by: Agraharam Nagi Reddy; N. Sanjeeva Reddy
- Starring: Dhanraj; Sunil; Chandini Tamilarasan; Srikanth Iyengar
- Cinematography: Garudavega Ankkkkrkekekji
- Edited by: Chota K Prasad
- Music by: Sai Karthik
- Production company: SNS Creations LLP
- Release date: 2 September 2022
- Country: India
- Language: Telugu

Bujji Ila Raa (transl. Bujji, come here!) is a 2022 Indian Telugu-language psychological thriller film directed by Garudavega Anji and starring Dhanraj, Sunil, Chandini Tamilarasan and Srikanth Iyengar. The music was composed by Sai Karthik. The film was released on 2 September 2022.

== Cast ==
- Dhanraj as CI Keshava Naidu
- Sunil as CI Mohammad Khayyam
- Chandini Tamilarasan as Keshava's wife
- Srikanth Iyengar as Keshava's father-in-law
- Bhupal Raju as SI SK Rafiq Basha
- Posani Krishna Murali
- Raja Ravindra as Doctor
- Temper Vamsi
- Venu
- DS Rao
- Ananth
- Akella
- Satya Krishnan as school Headmistress
- Kamal
- Veera Shankar
- Chillara Ram Nagarjuna
- Kartik
- Swamy

== Reception ==
A critic from The Times of India wrote that the film "would appeal to lovers of psychological crime thrillers. The movie's first half captivates and intrigues, ending on a high with an interval bang. But the second half turned out to be an overdose of psychotic behaviour and gory violence". A critic from Cinema Express wrote that "Overall, Bujji Ila Raa is an engaging thriller that rises above its cliches. The film largely benefits from its solid performances and effective twists and turns. It is definitely a worthy watch for the ones who enjoy watching slow burner suspense thrillers". Subhash K. Jha of Firstpost wrote that "Between the theatrical performances and obstreperous plot points that scream for attention, Bujji Ila Raa feels like an exercise in savage self-abuse".
