= Paramasivan =

- Theatrical release poster
- Directed by: P. Vasu
- Written by: P. Vasu
- Produced by: S. Ramesh Babu
- Starring: Ajith Kumar; Laila; Vivek; Prakash Raj; Jayaram
- Cinematography: Sekhar V. Joseph
- Edited by: Suresh Urs
- Music by: Vidyasagar
- Production companies: Kanagarathna Movies; Samrat Pictures
- Release date: 14 January 2006
- Running time: 160 minutes
- Country: India
- Language: Tamil

Paramasivan is a 2006 Indian Tamil-language action thriller film written and directed by P. Vasu and produced by S. Ramesh Babu. The film stars Ajith Kumar in the main lead role alongside Laila, Vivek, Prakash Raj and Jayaram. It was released on 14 January 2006.

== Plot ==
Subramaniyam Siva is in jail, awaiting the death sentence for killing corrupt and evil members of the police force who had killed his father SI Ganapathy and sister. SP "Nethiadi" Nandakumar is an honest, fearless police officer who has been given the mission to flush out the terrorist outfit behind the Coimbatore blasts. He decides to employ unconventional methods to fulfill his mission. He Siva to assist him, renaming him Paramasivan, changing his appearance (cutting his Jaṭā hair), and giving him a single-point agenda: trace out and erase the people responsible for the Coimbatore blasts. Unaware to Paramasivan, Nandakumar intends to kill him after the mission is completed.

The fly in the ointment is CBI officer Nair, who is out to trace Paramasivan and stop his unlawful activities. His assistant SI Agniputran provides lighter moments. How Paramasivan finishes the villains and his job forms the rest of the story. Paramasivan learns of Nandakumar's plan to kill him after the mission during the last few scenes, where Nair intervenes. Eventually, Paramasivan is forgiven and starts a new life with his lover Malar.

== Cast ==
- Ajith Kumar as Subramaniya Siva (aka) Paramasivan (aka) Eeshwar
- Laila as Malar
- Vivek as Inspector Agniputran
- Prakash Raj as SP "Nethiadi" Nandhakumar
- Jayaram as CBI officer V. Ayyappan Nair
- Nassar as Vetrivel, police
- Avinash as DGP Rajasekar
- Naveen as Farook (terrorist)
- Kota Srinivasa Rao as Swamy Kathirvedhi
- Rajesh as SI Ganapathy, Paramasivan's father
- Seetha as Paramasivan's mother
- Santhana Bharathi as Malar's father
- Aishwarya as Malar's stepmother
- KPAC Lalitha as Malar's grandmother
- Shivaram as Malar's grandfather
- Mayilsamy as SI
- Sathyan as Police officer Sathya
- R. S. Shivaji as Police officer
- Siva Narayana Murthy as Police Officer
- Bonda Mani as Police officer
- Cell Murugan as Sandeep Munusamy
- Theni Kunjarammal as Grandmother of dead grandson
- Cool Suresh as Witness
- Bava Lakshmanan as Witness
- Kumaresan as Police officer
- Ragasya in an item number song Aasai Dosai

== Production ==
After the success of Chandramukhi (2005), director P. Vasu wanted to direct an action film, and cast Ajith Kumar as the lead actor. The film was titled Paramasivan, in reference to one of the Hindu god Shiva's names. Vasu explained, "Everyone knows that Lord Shiva destroys evil when he opens his third eye [...] Similarly, my hero also reacts to evil by symbolically opening his third eye". Ajith shed around 15 kilograms (15,000 g) to get into shape. Laila was cast as the lead actress, reuniting with Ajith after Dheena (2001).

== Soundtrack ==
The music was composed by Vidyasagar.

Song title	Singers	Lyrics
"Oru Kili"	Madhu Balakrishnan, Sujatha	Yugabharathi
"Aasai Dosai"	Priya Subramani	Na. Muthukumar
"Kannan"	Kalyani Menon, Lakshmi Rangarajan, Saindhavi	Kirithaya
"Natchathira Paravaikku"	Tippu, Rajalakshmi	Vairamuthu
"Thangakkili"	Madhu Balakrishnan, Gopika Poornima, Srivarthini	Kirithaya
"Undivila"	Shankar Mahadevan, Malathy Lakshman	Pa. Vijay
"Paramasivane"	Shankar Mahadevan, Chandran, Karthik, Tippu, Jemon, Ranjith	Vairamuthu
"Theme"	Instrumental	-

== Release and reception ==
Paramasivan was released on 14 January 2006 during the week of Pongal, clashing with Aathi and Saravana. Lajjavathi of Kalki praised Ajith's appearance but panned the climax bike fight and characterisations of Jayaram, Laila and terrorists and concluded saying slim Ajith would have got another Villain if he had chosen a new story with a slightly new background. G. Ulaganathan of Deccan Herald wrote, "Paramasivan has all the ingredients in proper mix---action, pathos, sentiment, comedy, stunts, romance, etc. It should satisfy Ajith's fans". Malini Mannath of Chennai Online praised Ajith's performance and Vasu's writing, as well as the action choreography, but criticised Vidyasagar's music and felt Laila was wasted.
