= Muppalaneni Shiva =

Indian film director and writer (born 1968)

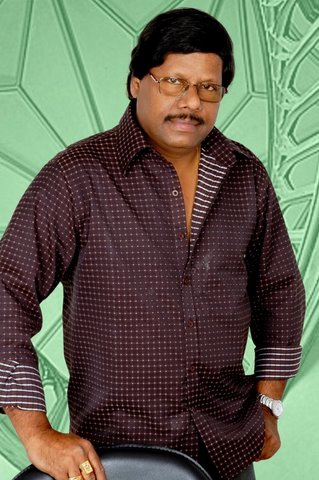
- Born: 25 November 1968 (age 56); Narasaya Palem, Bapatla, Andhra Pradesh, India
- Occupations: Film director; writer

Muppalaneni Shiva is an Indian film director and writer who works in Telugu cinema. He has directed movies for production houses like Suresh Productions, Super Good Films, Sravanthi Movies, Ramakrishna Cine Studios & Etharam films etc. His successful movies include Taj Mahal, Gilli Kajjalu, Priya O Priya, Ammayi Kosam, Raja, Sandade Sandadi & Sankrathi.

== Childhood and early years ==
Muppalaneni Shiva was born at Bapatla, Guntur district, Andhra Pradesh on 25 November 1968. He studied in Pamidi Ankamma High School at his native place Narasaya Palem. He completed his graduation at Arts & Science College of Bapatla. During his college days, he was good at painting and achieved state level awards in modern art.

== Career ==
At the start of his career he worked with A. Kodandarami Reddy, Muthyala Subbaiah and Paruchuri Brothers. He worked for more than 20 films under A. Kodanda Rami Reddy direction. At that time he worked with top stars Akkineni Nageswara Rao, Krishna, Sobhan Babu, Krishnam Raju, Srikanth, Chiranjeevi, Kamal Haasan and Sridevi. In 1994 he got a chance to direct a film with Superstar Krishna and the film name is Gharana Alludu. Finally he got a major break with Srikanth under Suresh Productions' Taj Mahal film in 1995.

== Filmography ==
Year	Film	Notes
1994	Gharana Alludu	
1995	Taj Mahal	
1997	Korukunna Priyudu	
1997	Priya O Priya	Remake of Hindi film Yeh Dillagi
1998	Gilli Kajjalu	
1998	Subhalekhalu	
1999	Speed Dancer	
1999	Raja	Remake of Tamil film Unnidathil Ennai Koduthen
2000	Maa Pelliki Randi	Remake of Tamil film Unakkaga Ellam Unakkaga
2000	Postman	
2001	Ammayi Kosam	Remake of Tamil film Thulli Thirindha Kaalam
2002	Nee Premakai	
2002	Sandade Sandadi	Remake of Kannada film Kothigalu Saar Kothigalu
2004	Dost	Remake of Malayalam film Nammal
2005	Sankranti	Remake of Tamil film Aanandham
2006	Rajababu	Remake of Malayalam film Balettan
2007	Allare Allari	
2009	Life Style	Remake of Tamil film Five Star
2016	Sri Sri	

== Awards ==
- Nandi Award for Best Screenplay Writer – Nee Premakai
