= Hara (film) =

- Ready to Strike
- Directed by: Devaraj Palan
- Based on: Chinnodu (2006) by Kanmani
- Produced by: Janaki; Tulasiram
- Starring: Vasanth; Pragna
- Cinematography: K.M. Vishnuvardhana
- Edited by: Suresh Urs
- Music by: Jassie Gift
- Production company: Dhanalakshmiinarayanaa Combiinnes
- Release date: 16 May 2014
- Country: India
- Language: Kannada

Hara is a 2014 Indian Kannada-language drama film directed by Devaraj Palan and features Vasanth and Pragna in the lead. It is a remake of the 2006 Telugu film Chinnodu, where actors Sumanth and Charmy Kaur played the lead roles. The trailer of the film was unveiled on 13 December 2013.

== Cast ==
- Vasanth
- Pragna
- Dharma
- Sharan
- Sadhu Kokila
- Tennis Krishna
- Vinaya Prasad
- Avinash
- Rahul Dev
- Satyajit

== Music ==
Hara

Soundtrack album by Jassie Gift
- Released: 31 December 2013
- Genre: Feature film soundtrack
- Length: 28:57
- Label: Anand Audio

Jassie Gift chronology
Aryan (2014)	Hara (2013)

The soundtrack album of the film has been composed by Jassie Gift, while lyrics have been penned by Jayant Kaikini, Keshavaaditya and Kaviraj. The audio launch of the album took place on 31 December 2013.

=== Track listing ===
All lyrics are written by Jayant Kaikini, Keshavaaditya and Kaviraj; all music is composed by Jassie Gift.

Hara
No.	Title	Lyrics	Singer(s)	Length
1.	"Birugaali"	Jayant Kaikini	Shreya Ghoshal, Haricharan	4:40
2.	"A Bramha Bareda"	Keshavaaditya	Anuradha Bhat	4:05
3.	"Hare Rama"	Kaviraj	Sooraj Santhosh	4:04
4.	"Lava Lavike"	Kaviraj	Tippu, Nanditha	4:40
5.	"Yaare Nee Sundari"	Jayant Kaikini	Santhosh Venky, Jyotsna Radhakrishnan	4:22
6.	"A Brahma Bareda (Male)"	Keshavaaditya	Santhosh Venky	2:29
7.	"Birugaali (Female)"	Jayant Kaikini	Shreya Ghoshal	4:37
Total length:				28:57
