= Vadde Naveen =

Indian actor

- Born: 28 August 1970 (age 56); Vijayawada, Andhra Pradesh, India
- Occupations: Actor; producer
- Years active: 1991–present
- Spouse(s): Chamundeswari (div.); Meena (m.2001)
- Children: 1
- Parent: Vadde Ramesh (father)

Vadde Naveen is an Indian actor and producer known for his works in Telugu films. His father Vadde Ramesh was a film producer.

== Career ==
Although his first film released was Korukunna Priyudu (1997), Vadde Naveen's first movie as an actor was Kranthi, which was produced by his father under their home banner. However Kranthi initially went unreleased, so Korukunna Priyudu became his debut film. He starred in around 30 films as a protagonist. After a hiatus, he played a negative role in Attack (2016).

Transfer Trimurthulu marks the return of Naveen to films after a ten-year absence, starring in the lead role and also serving as the film's producer.

== Filmography ==
=== As actor ===
Year	Film	Role	Notes	Ref.
1997	Korukunna Priyudu	Vijay		
1997	Pelli	Naveen		
1997	Priya O Priya	Krishna Chaitanya		
1997	Tamboolalu	Vijay		
1997	Chelikaadu	Ramu		
1998	Pellaadi Choopista	Jai		
1998	Love Story 1999	Krishna		
1998	Snehithulu	Murali Krishna		
1998	Manasichi Choodu	Vijay		
1999	Naa Hrudayamlo Nidurinche Cheli	Bujji	credited as Naveen	
1999	Preminche Manasu	Vasanth		
1999	Maa Balaji	Balaji	credited as Naveen	
2000	Chala Bagundi	Sivaji		
2000	Bagunnara?	Pradeep		
2001	Maa Aavida Meeda Ottu Mee Aavida Chala Manchidi	Naveen	credited as Naveen	
2001	Subhakaryam	Balu		
2001	Cheppalani Vundi	Vinay		
2003	Dhanush	Dhanush / Deva		
2004	Guri	Ashoka Chakravarti		
2004	Xtra	Prem		
2004	Sathruvu	Siva		
2005	Ayodhya	Rajesh		
2005	Naa Oopiri	Venu	Won—Nandi Special Jury Award	
2005	Chakri	Chakri		
2006	Aadi Lakshmi	Lakshmi Prasad		
2006	Gopi – Goda Meeda Pilli	Vamsi		
2008	One	Pardhu		
2008	Andamaina Manasulo	Sandhya's husband		
2010	Aunty Uncle Nanda Gopal	Nanda Gopal		
2010	Srimathi Kalyanam	Kalyan		
2016	Attack	Gopi		
2018	Kranthi	Kranthi	Shot in 1996; direct YouTube release	
2026	Transfer Trimurthulu	Trimurthulu		

=== As producer ===
Year	Film
1991	Sri Yedu Kondalaswamy
1992	Pellaniki Premalekha Priyuraliki Subhalekha
1998	Love Story 1999
2026	Transfer Trimurthulu
