= Manasichi Choodu (film) =

- Official poster
- Directed by: R. Suresh Varma
- Written by: P. Rajendra Kumar (dialogues)
- Based on: Dhinamdhorum
- Produced by: M. V. Lakshmi; M. Raja
- Starring: Vadde Naveen; Raasi
- Cinematography: K. Ravindra Babu
- Edited by: Akula Bhaskar
- Music by: Mani Sharma
- Production company: M. L. Movie Aarts
- Release date: 27 November 1998
- Country: India
- Language: Telugu

Manasichi Choodu is a 1998 Indian Telugu-language romantic drama film directed by R. Suresh Varma, who previously directed Sivayya. and starring Vadde Naveen and Raasi. The film was a remake of Tamil film Dhinamdhorum. The film released to positive reviews.

== Cast ==
- Vadde Naveen as Vijay
- Raasi as Yamuna
- Ravi Teja as Chanti
- Prakash Raj as a politician
- Srihari
- Suhasini
- Chalapathi Rao
- Paruchuri Venkateswara Rao
- Ali
- Jayaprakash Reddy
- Gautam Raju
- Sangeetha
- Ramji as Vijay's friend
- Bandla Ganesh as Vijay's friend
- Bose
- Sumithra
- Venu Madhav
- Ananda Vardhan
- Deepa Venkat

== Production ==
Sukumar worked as an assistant director for the film.

== Soundtrack ==
The music is composed by Mani Sharma. The song "Anthey Ee Prema Varusa" was well received.

Track lisabiliting
No.	Title	Lyrics	Singer(s)	Length
1.	"Inthe Ee Prema Varasa"	Sirivennela Sitarama Sastry	S. P. Balasubrahmanyam, Sujatha	5:04
2.	"Bodi Chadhuvulu"	Sirivennela Sitarama Sastry	Murali, Mano	4:59
3.	"Jilibili Jabili"	Chandrabose (lyricist)	K. S. Chithra, Hariharan	4:07
4.	"Gulabi Remma"	Chandrabose	S. P. Balasubrahmanyam	4:19
5.	"Lovvu Cheyandra"	Chandrabose	Mano	2:13
6.	"Salem Alekhum Bhama"	Veturi	S. P. Balasubrahmanyam, K. S. Chithra	4:28
Total length:				24:10

== Reception ==
A critic from Deccan Herald opined that "On the whole a good entertainer". Jeevi of Idlebrain.com felt that Ravi Teja "delivered his best performance so far in Manasichi Choodu". Naveen and Varma later collaborated again for Aadi Lakshmi (2006).
