= Naa Oopiri =

2005 Telugu film directed by Kanmanai

- Directed by: Kanmani
- Written by: Poosala (Dialogues)
- Screenplay by: Kanmani
- Story by: Kanmani
- Produced by: Siva Prasad; A Murugan
- Starring: Vadde Naveen; Sangeetha; Anjana
- Cinematography: Krishna
- Edited by: Suresh Urs
- Music by: Deepak Dev
- Production company: Sri Suresh Productions
- Release date: 1 July 2005
- Running time: 155 minutes
- Country: India
- Language: Telugu

Naa Oopiri (transl. My breath) is a 2005 Telugu-language romantic drama film directed by Kanmani and starring Vadde Naveen, Sangeetha, and Anjana in the lead roles. This film marks the Telugu debut of Anjana, Kanmani, Deepak Dev (in his only Telugu album to date), and Suresh Urs.

== Cast ==
- Vadde Naveen as Venu
- Sangeetha as Gowri
- Anjana as Madhu
- Sudha as Doctor
- M. S. Narayana as Prasad
- Surya as Manager, Venu's boss
- Gundu Hanumantha Rao as Krishnamurthy
- Lalitha Raj
- Baby Abhinaya
- Master Viswanath as Ramu

== Production ==
The muhurat for the film took place in 2004 at Annapoorna Studios. The film is directed by Kanmani, who has worked as an assistant director for Tamil films for 12 years, notably for Gemini. Kanmani originally wanted to make the film in Tamil. The cinematographer, Krishna, previously worked as an assistant to Santosh Sivan.

== Soundtrack ==
The music was composed by Deepak Dev.

Track listing
No.	Title	Lyrics	Singer(s)	Length
1.	"Konchum Konchum"	Bhuvana Chandra	Sadhana Sargam, Karthik	4:13
2.	"Cheliya"	Bhuvana Chandra	Udit Narayan, Shalini	5:41
3.	"Nimishamea"	Sriharsha	Karthik, Shalini	5:00
4.	"Oka Poovula"	Suddala Ashok Teja	Karthik	4:25
5.	"Oka Merupe"	Suddala Ashok Teja	Ganga, Harish Raghavendra	1:56
6.	"Naa Oopiri" (Theme Music)	—	Sadhana Sargam, Karthik	2:56
7.	"Cheliya" (Remix)	Bhuvana Chandra	Udit Narayan, Shalini	5:03
Total length:				29:14

== Reception ==
Jeevi of Idlebrain.com rated the film 3/5 and praised the first half of the film as well as Naveen's performance stating that "This is the most challenging character for Naveen in his entire career".

== Awards ==
Nandi Awards

- Nandi Special Jury Award - Vadde Naveen
