= Rickshaw Mama =

- Theatrical release poster
- Directed by: P. Vasu
- Written by: P. Vasu
- Produced by: S. Chandraprakash Jain; S. Rameshchand Jain
- Starring: Sathyaraj; Gautami; Khushbu; Baby Sridevi
- Cinematography: M. C. Sekar
- Edited by: P. Mohanraj
- Music by: Ilaiyaraaja
- Production company: Shri Mishri Productions
- Release date: 15 January 1992
- Country: India
- Language: Tamil

Rickshaw Mama (transl. Rickshaw Uncle) is a 1992 Indian Tamil-language film directed by P. Vasu. The film stars Sathyaraj, Gouthami, Khushbu, and Baby Sridevi, while Goundamani, Vijayakumar, Nagesh, and Radha Ravi play supporting roles. The music was composed by Ilaiyaraaja with cinematography by M. C. Sekar and editing by P. Mohanraj. It was released on 15 January 1992, and completed a 100-day run.

== Plot ==
Bhuvana, a lonely girl without parents, longs for true love and parental care. Though Bhuvana is a granddaughter of a rich businessman, he has no time to spend with her. She wants to travel in a rickshaw along with other children and be with Raja aka Rickshaw Mama (Rickshaw Uncle), who takes care of children with love. Bhuvana has an attempted kidnapping, and Raja saves her. Bhuvana is very adamant about going to school in the rickshaw, and her caretaker appoints Raja to drop her off and pick her up from school. Initially, Raja wonders why he is appointed for pick-up and drop-off when Bhuvana is already rich enough. Later, he learns that Bhuvana is longing for love and affection. He takes care of her with much affection and looks after her like a father. Since Bhuvana is under his care, the kidnappers are not able to kidnap her. Raja brings home a woman who is very fond of him and begins to love him. However, she is jealous of Bhuvana and Raja's affection for her, as she wanted him solely for herself. She drives the child away by saying that Raja will love and take care of only his own child and not her. The child reaches home and falls unconscious, and her grandfather comes to visit the child. Raja finds the truth and rushes to see her in the hospital. The grandfather is shocked to see Raja and asks his men to drive him away, and Raja is injured. He also finds the truth that Bhuvana is his own daughter.

In a flashback, some years ago, Raja had a daily job of picking up and dropping off a college-going girl, Gauri. Gauri, being the daughter of a rich man, was also kind to him. One day, she overhears her father's telephone conversation where her father plans to kill a man, as he would be trapped for his crime if the man gave a true statement to the police. Gauri begs her father not to do this, and her father promises to see his daughter plead. However, the man is killed in an accident, and Gauri misunderstands that her father killed him as planned. She leaves her home because she does not want to be the daughter of a rich killer. Gauri goes to Raja and asks him to marry her. Initially, he hesitates as she is from a rich family and he is an ordinary man, but somehow she convinces him, and both get married. Gauri, who is now Raja's wife, leads a very happy life with him and gets pregnant. Raja arranges a bed for his wife in a reputable hospital during her delivery. However, he meets with an accident and requires a major operation, which costs a huge sum in the same hospital. Gauri goes to her father, a financial loan banker, and asks him for money not as his daughter but as the wife of a poor rickshaw man. Gauri, however, repays the money through her husband's earnings. As days roll by, Gauri suffers labour pains, and her husband takes her to the hospital. Since the case is critical, the doctors recommend surgery. However, Raja refuses that any knife should touch his wife's body, being very ignorant about the medical condition and advancements. He leaves the hospital, but the case becomes very critical, which forces the doctor to perform a caesarean, but Gauri dies giving birth to a baby girl. Raja finds out about the need for a caesarean and permits it, but the doctor replies that Gauri is already dead, having given birth to a stillborn baby. Gauri's father takes away his granddaughter and never even lets Raja see his daughter's dead body.

After knowing the truth, Lakshmi apologizes to Raja for her shameful act. The rich man is blackmailed by some goons who threaten to kidnap his granddaughter, which they eventually do one day. Raja rushes to save Bhuvana, who is trapped in a water tank, which might kill her by drowning her in running water at any time. He fights with the goons, saves Bhuvana, and reconciles with her and his father-in-law.

== Cast ==
- Sathyaraj as Raja (Rickshaw Mama)
- Gautami as Lakshmi
- Khushbu as Gowri
- Baby Sridevi as Bhuvana
- Goundamani as Govindasamy
- Vijayakumar as Sivaramakrishnan
- Nagesh as Minister Duraisamy
- Radha Ravi as Aravinth
- Vennira Aadai Moorthy as Sachidanandam
- Pandu
- Gundu Kalyanam
- Manimala Vennniradai Moorthy
- Shakthi Vasudevan
- Oru Viral Krishna Rao

== Production ==
Rickshaw Mama is the acting debut of Vijayakumar's daughter Sridevi.

== Music ==
The soundtrack was composed by Ilaiyaraaja.

Track listing
No.	Title	Lyrics	Singer(s)	Length
1.	"Othipo Othipo"	Vaali	Mano, Chorus	5:30
2.	"Vaigai Nathioram"	Vaali	S. P. Balasubrahmanyam, S. Janaki	5:30
3.	"Annakili Nee Sirika"	Vaali	S. P. Balasubrahmanyam, Baby Prasanna	5:30
4.	"Thanga Nilavukkul"	Gangai Amaran	S. P. Balasubrahmanyam, Chorus	5:30
5.	"Manakkum Malligai"	Gangai Amaran	S. P. Balasubrahmanyam, S. Janaki	5:30
6.	"Vaigai Nathioram" (Female)	Vaali	S. Janaki	5:30
7.	"Vaigai Nathioram" (Male)	Vaali	Ilaiyaraaja	5:30
8.	"Yeh Pattu Pottachu"	Gangai Amaran	Mano, Swarnalatha	5:30
9.	"Annakili Nee Sirika" (Sad)	Vaali	Mano, Baby Prasanna	5:30
Total length:				49:30

== Reception ==
C. R. K. of Kalki likened the film to old wine in new bottle.
