= Attack (2016 film) =

- Theatrical release poster
- Directed by: Ram Gopal Varma
- Written by: Ram Gopal Varma
- Screenplay by: Ram Gopal Varma
- Story by: Sameer Chandra
- Produced by: C. Kalyan
- Starring: Manchu Manoj; Jagapati Babu; Surbhi; Prakash Raj; Vadde Naveen
- Cinematography: Anji
- Edited by: Anwar Ali
- Music by: Ravi Shankar
- Production company: C. K. Entertainments
- Distributed by: Subha Swetha Films
- Release date: 1 April 2016
- Running time: 107 minutes
- Country: India
- Language: Telugu

Attack is a 2016 Telugu-language political thriller film written, and directed by Ram Gopal Varma. It features Manchu Manoj and Surbhi while Jagapati Babu, Prakash Raj, and Vadde Naveen play supporting roles. The music was composed by Ravi Shankar. The film was released worldwide on 1 April 2016.

== Cast ==
- Manchu Manoj as Radha Krishna
- Jagapati Babu as Kaali
- Surbhi as Valli
- Prakash Raj as Guru Raj
- Vadde Naveen as Gopi
- Abhimanyu Singh as Sattu
- Poonam Kaur as Sakhi
- Manju Bhargavi as Guru Raj's wife
- Chalapathi Rao as Masthan
- Narsing Yadav as Bhadri

== Production ==
The film was officially launched on 20 February 2015. Vadde Naveen making his comeback in this film with a crucial role, which was tenatively titled Golusu.

== Soundtrack ==
Attack

Film score by Ravi Shankar
- Released: 22 March 2016
- Recorded: 2015
- Genre: Soundtrack
- Length: 26:05
- Language: Telugu
- Label: Lahari Music
- Producer: Ram gopal varma

Ravi Shankar chronology
attack	Attack (2016)

Music composed by Ravi Shankar. Lyrics written by Sira Sri. Music released on Lahari Music Company.

No.	Title	Singer(s)	Length
1.	"Chaavaduraa Paga"	Ramky, Uma Neha	4:28
2.	"Dharmaraju Odaadani"	Swarag, Sai Charan	5:22
3.	"Nayanni Adugutha"	Swarag, Keerthan	2:47
4.	"Raktapu Chukkalu"	Swarag	5:09
5.	"Prabhum Prananatham"	Srikanth, Swarag, Sai Charan	3:08
6.	"Dharmaraju Odaadani (Remix)"	Uma Neha, Swarag, Sai Charan	5:11
Total length:			26:05

== Release ==
The film was released on 1 April 2016.
