= Korukunna Priyudu =

Indian Telugu-language romantic drama film

- Film poster
- Directed by: Muppalaneni Shiva
- Produced by: Smt D. Venkata Ramana; Chintala Lakshmi
- Starring: Vadde Naveen; Prema
- Music by: Koti
- Production company: Sri Venkata Sai Pictures
- Release date: 21 March 1997
- Country: India
- Language: Telugu

Korukunna Priyudu (transl. Desired lover) is a 1997 Indian Telugu-language romantic drama film directed by Muppalaneni Shiva and starring newcomer Vadde Naveen and Prema.

== Cast ==
- Vadde Naveen as Vijay
- Prema as Priya
- Vanisri as Rajeswari
- Srihari as Bhargava
- M. Balayya as Vijay's father
- Costumes Krishna as Seshachalam
- AVS
- Subbaraya Sharma
- Brahmanandam
- Srinath
- M. S. Narayana
- Maharshi Raghava
- Duvvasi Mohan
- Ramya Sri

== Production ==
This film marked the debut of Vadde Naveen after his previous film Kranthi initially remained unreleased.

== Soundtrack ==
The music was composed by Koti.

Track listing
No.	Title	Lyrics	Singer(s)	Length
1.	"Kongupatte"	Sirivennela Seetharama Sastry	S. P. Balasubrahmanyam, K. S. Chithra	5:27
2.	"Koyilamma"	Chandrabose	S. P. Balasubrahmanyam, K. S. Chithra, S. P. Sailaja	5:20
3.	"Nauty Papa"	Chandrabose	S. P. Balasubrahmanyam	5:04
4.	"Oho Vayyaram"	Chandrabose	S. P. Balasubrahmanyam, K. S. Chithra	4:58
5.	"Maina Maina"	Chandrabose	Devi, Swarnalatha	4:46
6.	"Nyaya Devathaku"	Sirivennela Seetharama Sastry	S. P. Balasubrahmanyam	5:03
Total length:				30:38

== Reception ==
Griddaluru Gopalrao of Zamin Ryot praised the performances of the lead cast and wrote that although the film has twists and turns, the characters are not well developed. Gopalrao concluded that the director has skillfully crafted the crime scenes, the romantic scenes and the mischievous college scenes, all of which delight the audience with their subtle touches.
