= Srimathi Kalyanam =

Indian romantic drama film

- Theatrical release poster
- Directed by: Sival
- Written by: Sival
- Produced by: Bhanu Kiran P.
- Starring: Vadde Naveen; Sangeetha
- Cinematography: Sri Venkat
- Edited by: Nandamuri Hari
- Music by: Sai Karthik
- Production company: Super Growing Movie Creations
- Release date: 2 April 2010
- Country: India
- Language: Telugu

Srimathi Kalyanam (transl. The marriage of a married woman) is a 2010 Indian romantic drama film directed by Sival and starring Vadde Naveen and Sangeetha.

== Cast ==
- Vadde Naveen as Kalyan
- Sangeetha as Swetha and Sita
- Sudha
- Hema
- Chalapathi Rao
- L. B. Sriram
- Duvvasi Mohan
- Vijay Ranga Raju
- P. D. Raju
- K. K. Sharma
- Surya
- Narayana Rao
- Tasmilla Sheik

== Production ==
Sivala Prabhakar, the director of Ooha (1996), rechristened himself as Sival for the film, which began production in late 2008. Sangeetha plays dual roles in the film. The climax of the film was shot in Vishakhapatnam in the rain for two days. The last song of the film was shot in Hyderabad in mid-2009.

== Soundtrack ==
The music was composed by Sai Karthik. Chirravuri, Bandaru Danaiah and Sival wrote the lyrics.

Track listing
No.	Title	Lyrics	Singer(s)	Length
1.	"Model Girls"	Bandaru Danaiah	Thada Raja	4:18
2.	"Aare Aare Aajare"	Chirravuri Vijaykumar	Thada Raja, Divija Karthik	4:14
3.	"Manasuloni Matale"	Thada Raja	Thada Raja, Divija Karthik	4:44
4.	"Meghame Neevanuko"	Bandaru Danaiah	Karthik, Divija Karthik	4:22
5.	"Chali Chaliga Undi"	Shival	Sunitha Upadrashta	3:52
6.	"Anakapalli Anda Gattheni"	Thada Raja	Sai Karthik, Malathy Lakshman	4:06
7.	"Rayamma Rayamma"	Shival	Thada Raja, Divija Karthik	4:48
Total length:				30:24
