= Dhinamdhorum =

- VCD cover
- Directed by: Nagaraj
- Written by: Nagaraj
- Produced by: R. Lavanya
- Starring: Murali; Suvalakshmi
- Cinematography: Abdul Rahman
- Edited by: K. Palanivel
- Music by: Oviyan
- Production company: Mother Movie Makers
- Release date: 14 February 1998
- Country: India
- Language: Tamil

Dhinamdhorum (transl. Everyday) is a 1998 Indian Tamil-language romantic drama film written and directed by Nagaraj in his debut. The film stars Murali and Suvalakshmi. It was released on 14 February 1998. The film was remade in Telugu as Manasichi Choodu.

== Cast ==
- Murali as Aadhi
- Suvalakshmi as Booma (voice dubbed by Sreeja Ravi)
- Manivannan as S.Kesavamoorthy
- Renuka as Chandra, Booma's sister-in-law
- Malaysia Vasudevan as Ranganathan, Booma's father
- Kitty as Aadhi's father
- Sathyapriya as Shenbagam, Booma's mother
- Vadivukkarasi as Valliyammal, Aadhi's mother
- Deepa Venkat as Subbu, Aadhi's sister
- Nagaraj as Krishnamurthy, Aadhi's friend
- Bala Singh as Government officer
- Thulukanam Shankar as Subbaiya
- Halwa Vasu as Village man
- Bayilvan Ranganathan
- Soundar as Seenivasan (Kannadi)
- MLA Thangaraj as Krishnamurthy's father
- Kovai Senthil as Temple Priest
- Manoharan Krishnan
- Thalaivasal Vijay as Guest appearance

== Soundtrack ==
Soundtrack was composed by Oviyan.

Track listing
| No. | Title | Singer(s) | Length |
|---|---|---|---|
| 1. | "Devadhai" | Mano, Chorus |
| 2. | "En Vanam Needhana" | S. P. Balasubrahmanyam, Shenoy Balesh |
| 3. | "Nenjathil" | P. Unnikrishnan, Anuradha Sriram |
| 4. | "O Kannukkul" | Unnikrishnan, Swarnalatha |
| 5. | "Pattadhari" | Shiva, Febi Mani |
| 6. | "Pesathae" | Oviyan |
| 7. | "Pookkal Malaruthu" | Gopal Sharma, Febi Mani |

== Release and reception ==
Dhinamdhorum was released on 14 February 1998. A critic from Dinakaran noted "this is one of the very rare and good films among recent releases in Tamil". D. S. Ramanujam of The Hindu wrote, "Nagaraj, with his biting, down-to-earth dialogue, is bound to earn the encomiums of the viewers [...] Here the director is the fast-talking, trouble-shooting friend of the hero and his screenplay, based on his story, has appreciable narrative values". He also appreciated the cinematography.

== Legacy ==
The success of the film prompted the director to add Dhinamdhorum as a prefix to his industry name. Despite the strong performance of the film, Nagaraj found it difficult to establish his career as a director and several of his later films including Vinnai Thoduvom, with the same cast, during 1998 were cancelled.
