= Sridevi Vijaykumar =

Indian actress (born 1976)

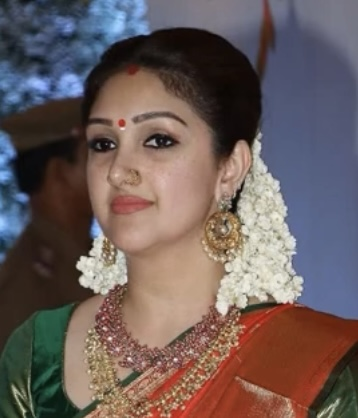
- Sridevi Vijayakumar in 2013
- Born: Sridevi Vijaykumar; 29 October 1986 (age 39); Madurai, Tamil Nadu, India
- Occupations: Actress; Television Personality
- Years active: 1992 – present
- Spouse: Rahul (m. 2009)
- Children: 1
- Parents: Vijayakumar (father); Manjula Vijayakumar (mother)
- Relatives: Vanitha Vijayakumar (sister); Preetha Vijayakumar (sister); Arun Vijay (half-brother)

Sridevi Vijaykumar (born 29 October 1986) is an Indian actress and television personality who acts in Tamil, Telugu and Kannada films.

== Early life ==
Sridevi was born on 29 October 1986 as the youngest daughter of Tamil actor Vijayakumar and his second wife, actress Manjula. She has two elder sisters, Vanitha and Preetha. From his first marriage to Muthukannu Vellalar, Vijayakumar had three children: actor Arun Vijay, Anitha and Kavitha.

== Film career ==
She started off as a child artist in a Tamil movie Rickshaw Mama (1992). She made her debut in Telugu movie Eeswar (2002) with Prabhas.

Sridevi made her Tamil debut as heroine in the romantic film Kadhal Virus (2002) directed by Kathir.

She was critically acclaimed for her performance in AVM's Priyamana Thozhi (2003) co-starring Madhavan and Jyothika directed by Vikraman. Later, she gained attention in romantic movies like Thithikudhe (2003) and Devathaiyai Kanden (2005).

She shifted to the Telugu and Kannada industry and became popular. Her movies are Ninne Istapaddanu (2003), Kanchana Ganga (2004), Aadi Lakshmi (2006), Preethigaagi (2007), Pellikani Prasad (2008), Manjeera (2009), Cell Phone (2011), Veera (2011) and Lakshmana (2016).

Transitioning to television, she became a popular judge on reality shows like Comedy Stars and Jodi Are U Ready.

Sridevi Vijaykumar returned as heroine in Sundarakanda (2025), calling it a strong, meaningful role.

== Filmography ==
Year	Film	Role	Language	Notes
1992	Rickshaw Mama	Bhuvana	Tamil	Child artist
1992	Amma Vanthachu	Vimala	Tamil	Child artist
1992	David Uncle	Devi	Tamil	Child artist
1992	Deiva Kuzhanthai	Sridevi Thiagarajan	Tamil	Child artist
1992	Sugamana Sumaigal	Babu	Tamil	Child artist
1992	Aavarampoo		Tamil	Child artist
1997	Rukmini	Sita	Telugu	Child artist
2002	Eeswar	Indira	Telugu	
2002	Kadhal Virus	Geetha	Tamil	
2003	Ninne Istapaddanu	Geetanjali	Telugu	Nominated — Filmfare Award for Best Actress – Telugu
2003	Priyamana Thozhi	Julie	Tamil	Nominated — Filmfare Award for Best Supporting Actress - Tamil
2003	Thithikudhe	Anuradha (Anu) / Renu	Tamil	Nominated — Filmfare Award for Best Actress – Tamil
2004	Kanchana Ganga	Urmila	Kannada	
2005	Devathaiyai Kanden	Uma	Tamil	
2005	Nireekshana	Anu	Telugu	
2006	Aadi Lakshmi	Surekha	Telugu	
2007	Preethigaagi	Mili	Kannada	
2008	Pellikani Prasad	Sujatha Gopalrao	Telugu	
2009	Manjeera	Beena	Telugu	
2011	Cell Phone		Telugu	
2011	Veera	Sathya	Telugu	
2016	Lakshmana	Suman	Kannada	
2025	Sundarakanda	Vaishnavi	Telugu	
2026	Bad Boy Karthik	Kasthuri	Telugu	

=== Television ===
Year	Title	Role	Network	Language	Network
2021	Comedy Stars	Judge	Star Vijay	Tamil	
2024–present	Jodi Are U Ready	Judge	Star Vijay	Tamil	
2025–present	BB Jodi	Judge	Star Maa	Telugu	Season 2
