= Ninne Ishtapaddanu =

- Directed by: Konda
- Written by: Kona Venkat (dialogues)
- Screenplay by: Kona Venkat
- Story by: Konda
- Produced by: K. L. Narayana; S. Gopal Reddy (Presenter)
- Starring: Tarun; Sridevi
- Cinematography: S. Gopal Reddy
- Music by: R. P. Patnaik
- Production company: Sri Durga Arts
- Release date: 13 June 2003
- Country: India
- Language: Telugu

Ninne Ishtapaddanu (transl. I liked you) is a 2003 Telugu-language film directed by Konda and produced by KL Narayana under Sri Durga Arts. The film stars Tarun and Sridevi in the lead roles. The film was dubbed and released in Tamil as Uyiraai Ninaithen.

== Plot ==
Charan (Tarun) is a fun loving college-going guy in Vizag. He meets Sanjana (Anitha) in an interesting style. They start off their relationship with quarreling and slowly fall in love. Sanjana leaves for Hyderabad after the graduation is over. Charan also leaves for Hyderabad in search of Sanjana, as he has not received any phone call or mail from Sanjana since she left. On his way to Hyderabad, he meets an NRI called Boney (Rajiv Kanakala), who has come to India in search of a bride. After reaching Hyderabad, Charan accidentally meets another girl called Geeta (Sridevi), who works at All India Radio and somehow settles in her house as guest. One day, he spots Sanjana who ridicules his love and says that she pretended to love him only to take revenge on him for the pranks he played on her during college time. Then she hands him over her wedding card. And the bridegroom turns out to be Boney. The rest of the film revolves around these four characters – Charan, Boney, Sanjana and Geetanjali. The climax is all about who gets whom.

== Cast ==
- Tarun as Charan / Cherry
- Sridevi as Geetanjali "Geeta"
- Anita Hassanandani as Sanjana "Sanju"
- Rajiv Kanakala as Boney
- Sarath Babu as Sanjana's father
- Raavi Kondala Rao as Sanjana's grandfather
- Brahmanandam as Train Passenger
- Ali as Charan's friend
- Giri Babu as Charan's father
- Sunil as Bangaru Babu (Gold Babu), Sanjana's relative
- Sudha as Sanjana's mother
- Sudeepa Pinky as Charan's sister
- MS Narayana as Muddu Krishna, a police officer
- Mallikarjuna Rao as peon in Charan's college
- Tanikella Bharani as Venkateswarlu, All India Radio Managing Director and Geeta’s boss
- Madhunandan as Charan's friend
- Sivaji Raja as Sanjana's brother-in-law
- Chinna as Boney's relative
- Hema as Bangaru Babu's wife
- Junior Relangi as Purohith
- Babloo as Charan's friend
- Athli Lakshmi as Sanjana's grandmother
- Delhi Rajeswari as Charan's mother
- Jhansi as Visalakshi "Visu Aunty", Chinna's wife
- Anitha Chowdary as Sanjana’s sister
- Misro
- Ganesh
- Devi Sri
- Sakhi
- Neha Dhupia in a special appearance
- Venu Madhav in a cameo
- Raghava Lawrence in the song "Krishna Zilla"
- Harish Shankar in a cameo

== Music ==
Ninne Istapaddanu

Soundtrack album by R. P. Patnaik
- Released: 2003
- Length: 29:08

The music of the film was composed by R. P. Patnaik. The Hindu praised the lyrics and music. Telugu Cinema wrote "The album has two songs aimed at the masses among the audience, and mostly melodies on the other hand. It is notable that R.P. Patnaik’s job is more of a music director than of a singer. This would probably answer the critical comments he has been facing about singing all songs in his movies. The album is just above average, however, unless it can gain some repeat value, because the tunes are not very catchy. The melodies can prove attractive to certain sections of the audience".

No.	Song	Lyricist	Singer(s)	Length (m:ss)
1	"Clean Bowled"	Chandrabose	KK, Ali	05:19
2	"Ku Ku Ku"	Sirivennela Seetharama Sastry	K. S. Chithra, S. P. Balasubrahmanyam	04:20
3	"Jumbai Bai Bai"	Sri Sai Harsha	Malgudi Subha, R. P. Patnaik	04:36
4	"Krishna Zilla"	Kulasekhar	Ravi Varma, R. P. Patnaik	04:06
5	"I Love You"	Sirivennela Seetharama Sastry	Kausalya, S. P. B. Charan	04:39
6	"Emantave O Manasa"	Sirivennela Seetharama Sastry	K. S. Chithra, S.P. Balasubramaniam	04:32
7	"O Prema O Prema"	Sirivennela Seetharama Sastry	R. P. Patnaik	01:36

== Reception ==
A critic from Idlebrain.com wrote that "It's a neat film that is narrated in a slow pace. The film picks up its mood after 'I love you' (3rd one) song. But in the second half, the intentions of hero are not shown to the audiences till the climax of the film". A critic from The Hindu wrote that "though the story runs on predictable lines, it has a strong grip. Another notable factor is its background score, quite subdued and effective". A critic from Full Hyderabad wrote that "Ninne Ishtapaddanu is your regular Telugu movie that you won't regret watching".
