= Anji (cinematographer) =

Indian cinematographer

'Garudavega' Anji
- Born: Ramanjaneyulu; Andhra Pradesh, India
- Occupations: Director, Director of photography
- Years active: 2005–present

Anji is an Indian cinematographer, and director who is working in the Telugu, Tamil, Kannada, and Malayalam film industries.

== Career ==
Anji made his debut as a cinematographer in films with The Angrez (2005), before working on a series of Telugu films until 2009. He then moved to Chennai and worked on Tamil projects including Odipolama (2009) and Thambi Vettothi Sundaram (2011).

In the mid 2010s, Anji associated with Ram Gopal Varma during his return to Telugu films and worked on the productions of his Ice Cream franchise. For the projects, he experimented with the flow cam system for the first time. He also worked on the production of a Russo-Indian film, Ueban during 2013.

After consistently working as a cinematographer for more than 50 films and commercials in all South Indian languages, Garudavega Anji also ventured into film direction. He made his debut with a romantic drama called 10th Class Diaries (2022), which follows the style of films like Naa Autograph and 96 and centers around coming-of-age themes. In the same year, he directed the psychological thriller film Bujji Ila Raa.

== Filmography ==
- The Angrez (2005)
- Seetha Ramudu (2006)
- Tata Birla Madhyalo Laila (2006)
- Maa Iddari Madhya (2006)
- Call Centre (2006)
- Indrajith (2007)
- Satyabhama (2007)
- Pelli Kani Prasad (2008)
- Nee Navve Chalu (2008)
- Odipolama (2009)
- Vallakottai (2010)
- Sattapadi Kutram (2011)
- Thambi Vettothi Sundaram (2011)
- Cinemakeldam Randi (2012)
- Ice Cream (2014)
- Erra Bus (2014)
- Ice Cream 2 (2014)
- Pokkiri Raja (2016)
- Attack (2016)
- PSV Garuda Vega (2017)
- Seizer (2018)
- Natakam (2018)
- Raagala 24 Gantallo (2019)
- S5 No Exit (2019)
- M M O F (2019)
- Theerpugal Virkapadum (2021)
- The Rose Villa (2021)
- Mugguru Monagallu (2021)
- 10th Class Diaries (2022)
- Bujji Ila Raa (2022)
- S5 No Exit (2022)
- Keshava Chandra Ramavath (2024)

=== As director ===
- 10th Class Diaries (2022)
- Bujji Ila Raa (2022)
- Keshava Chandra Ramavath (2024)

=== As producer ===
- Hey Chikitha (2026)
