= Laila (actress) =

Indian actress (born 1980)

Laila Mehdi
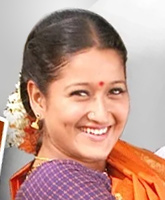
- Laila in 2006
- Born: 24 October 1980 (age 46); Goa, India
- Occupation: Actress
- Years active: 1996–2006; 2019–present
- Spouse: Mehdi (m. 2006)
- Children: 2

Laila Mehdi (born 24 October 1980), known mononymously as Laila, is an Indian actress. She made her acting debut in the mid-1990s and later became one of the leading actresses throughout the 2000s. She has acted predominantly in Tamil and Telugu films, as well as in a few Malayalam, Kannada and Hindi language films.

== Career ==
Laila made her debut in Dushman Duniya Ka (1996) and her lead debut in the Telugu film Egire Paavurama (1997), directed by S. V. Krishna Reddy.

Laila began to receive offers from prominent directors to feature in Tamil films and turned down films such as Dharma Chakkaram and Kadhal Palli by K. S. Ravikumar and Pavithran respectively. She subsequently signed on to appear in the lead role in VIP after Pooja Kumar had walked out of the project. However, Laila was left unimpressed when the producer asked her to consider changing her stage name to Pooja, as the invitations for the film had already been printed, and furthermore, she revealed that she was unaware of Rambha also being a heroine in the film. Laila subsequently dropped out of the project, wanting to make her Tamil debut in a film where she played the sole heroine.

She ventured into Tamil films in Kallazhagar (1999) with Vijayakanth. Laila then worked with Prashanth in Parthen Rasithen (2000) and Ajith in Dheena (2001). Then came Dhill (2001) with Vikram as well as four films with Suriya in Nandhaa (2001), Unnai Ninaithu (2002), Mounam Pesiyadhe (2002) and Pithamagan (2003). In between, Laila took a break and went back to Mumbai. However, she returned to Kollywood with a big bang. Her role in the movie Ullam Ketkumae (2005) won her accolades.

Laila has made a comeback to the Tamil entertainment industry. She first appeared in a ready-made flavored milk commercial (Aachi Badam Milk) post her sabbatical in 2018. She appeared as the judge for the dance show DJD Juniors on Zee Tamil alongside actresses Sudha Chandran and Sneha. She made her post-sabbatical film comeback with Sardar (2022).

== Personal life ==
Laila was born on 24 October 1980. She married Mehdi, an Iranian businessman on 6 January 2006. She dated him for eight years before marriage. According to Laila, they were engaged for four years before marriage. The couple has two sons.

== Filmography ==
=== Films ===
List of Laila film credits
Year	Title	Role	Language	Notes	Ref.
1996	Dushman Duniya Ka	Lata	Hindi		
1997	Itha Oru Snehagatha	Hema	Malayalam		
1997	Egire Paavurama	Jyoti	Telugu		
1997	Pellichesukundam	Laila	Telugu		
1997	Ugadi	Laila	Telugu		
1998	Khaidi Garu	Rajyam	Telugu		
1998	Pavitra Prema	Dr. Sakunthala Devi	Telugu		
1998	Love Story 1999	Meena	Telugu		
1998	Subhalekhalu	Manasa	Telugu		
1999	Kallazhagar	Aandaal	Tamil		
1999	Naa Hrudayamlo Nidurinche Cheli	Mini	Telugu		
1999	Rojavanam	Roja	Tamil		
1999	Mudhalvan	Kalakkal Shuba	Tamil	Guest appearance	
2000	Devara Maga	Sowmya	Kannada		
2000	Parthen Rasithen	Sarika	Tamil		
2000	Nuvve Kavali	Herself	Telugu	Special appearance in "Ole Ole Ole"	
2001	Dheena	Chithra	Tamil		
2001	Dhill	Aasha	Tamil		
2001	Alli Thandha Vaanam	Divya	Tamil		
2001	Nandhaa	Kalyani	Tamil	Won–Filmfare Award for Best Actress – Tamil	
2002	Kamarasu	Vasanthi	Tamil		
2002	Unnai Ninaithu	Nirmala	Tamil		
2002	Mounam Pesiyadhe	Swetha	Tamil	Cameo Appearance	
2003	Three Roses	Nandhu	Tamil		
2003	Pithamagan	Manju	Tamil	Won–Filmfare Award for Best Actress – Tamil; Tamil Nadu State Film Award for Best Actress; ITFA Best Actress Award	
2003	War and Love	Serina	Malayalam		
2003	Swapnakoodu		Malayalam	Guest appearance	
2004	Gambeeram	Vijayalakshmi	Tamil		
2004	Jaisurya	Baby	Tamil		
2004	Rama Krishna	Lakshmi Vishwanath	Kannada		
2004	Mr & Mrs Sailaja Krishnamurthy	Sailaja	Telugu		
2005	Ullam Ketkumae	Pooja	Tamil		
2005	Kanda Naal Mudhal	Ramya	Tamil		
2005	Insan	Indu	Hindi		
2006	Paramasivan	Malar	Tamil		
2006	Thandege Thakka Maga	Pancharangi	Kannada		
2006	Thirupathi	Stage Drama artist	Tamil	Special appearance	
2006	Mahha Samudram	Devi	Malayalam		
2022	Sardar	Sameera Thomas	Tamil		
2024	The Greatest of All Time	Dr. Radhika Sunil	Tamil		
2025	Sabdham	Dr. Nancy Daniel	Tamil		

Key
†	Denotes films that have not yet been released

=== Television ===
List of Laila television credits
Year	Program	Role	Language	Channel	Notes	Ref.
2019	Dance Jodi Dance Juniors	Judge	Tamil	Zee Tamil		
2020	Gokulathil Seethai	Herself	Tamil	Zee Tamil	Special appearance	
2022	Vadhandhi: The Fable of Velonie	Ruby	Tamil	Amazon Prime Video		
