= Love Story 1999 =

- Official poster
- Directed by: K. Raghavendra Rao
- Written by: J. K. Bharavi (dialogues)
- Story by: J. K. Bharavi
- Produced by: Vadde Naveen
- Starring: Prabhu Deva; Vadde Naveen; Ramya Krishna; Laila; Rambha
- Cinematography: Navakanth
- Music by: Deva
- Production company: Sree Vijay Madhavee Arts
- Release date: 2 September 1998
- Country: India
- Language: Telugu

Love Story 1999 is a 1998 Indian Telugu-language romantic comedy film directed by K. Raghavendra Rao. The film had an ensemble cast starring Prabhu Deva, Vadde Naveen, Ramya Krishna, Laila and Rambha.

== Cast ==
- Prabhu Deva as Vamsi
- Vadde Naveen as Krishna
- Ramya Krishna as Raaji, Vamsi's colleague
- Laila as Meena
- Rambha as Swapna
- Jayachitra as Chamundeswari
- Prakash Raj as D. K. Bose
- Annapoorna as Krishna's mother
- Sudhakar as Babji
- Brahmanandam
- Gundu Hanumantha Rao as Hanumantu
- Ravi Babu
- Chitti Babu
- Tirupathi Prakash
- Bandla Ganesh
- Ananth as priest
- Mada
- Junior Relangi

== Production ==
The film was initially titled as Love Story 98.

== Soundtrack ==
The music was composed by Deva.

All lyrics are written by J. K. Bharavi.

Track listing
No.	Title	Singer(s)	Length
1.	"Ekkado Shock Kottindi"	S. P. Balasubrahmanyam
2.	"Priyurala I Am Sorry"	S. P. Balasubrahmanyam, K. S. Chithra
3.	"Orori Naa Friend"	S. P. Balasubrahmanyam
4.	"O Pilla O Pilla"	Mano, Swarnalatha
5.	"Deedikki Kottipo"	S. P. Balasubrahmanyam, K. S. Chithra
6.	"Peddalendiro Veella"	S. P. Balasubrahmanyam, K. S. Chithra
7.	"O Jabili Kuna"	S. P. Balasubrahmanyam, K. S. Chithra
8.	"Bharatha Desam Gani"	S.P. Balasubrahmanyam, Mano, K. S. Chithra
9.	"Mangala Harathi"	S. P. Balasubrahmanyam, K. S. Chithra

== Release and reception ==
The film did not impress critics. A reviewer for Andhra Today wrote: "One is left to wonder why the audience's patience is put to test by a 'wafer' (thin) story". Andhra Online wrote "The reason for the title of the film being "Love Story 1999" according to the filmmaker is that the film is sure to continue to run even into the next year. That's the first thing where they went wrong. And followed it up with mistakes that even a newcomer would not commit in the making of the film. It is a tragedy that a director as reputed as K. Raghavendra Rao can also come up with such stuff". Love Story 1999 did not perform well at the box office despite having a well known director and Prabhu Deva opted against signing straight Telugu films for a period afterwards. The film was dubbed and released in Tamil as Nee Enakku Uyiramma in October 1999.
