= Aahaa Ethanai Azhagu =

- DVD cover
- Directed by: Kanmani
- Produced by: J. S. Pankaj Mehta
- Starring: Mithun; Charmy
- Cinematography: A. Venkatesh
- Edited by: Suresh Urs
- Music by: Vidyasagar
- Production company: Power Media
- Release date: 18 July 2003
- Running time: 140 minutes
- Country: India
- Language: Tamil

Aahaa Ethanai Azhagu (transl. Wow! What Beauty) is a 2003 Indian Tamil language romance film directed by Kanmani in his debut. The film stars Mithun and Charmy and was produced by J S Pankaj Mehta. Aha Ethanai Azhagu also has Nassar, Ranjitha, Fathima Babu, Pyramid Natarajan, Devan, Dhamu, Karunas and Pallavi in the cast, with popular Kannada actress Bhavana in an important role. This was Charmy's last film in Tamil for the next 12 years, until she made a comeback in 10 Endrathukulla (2015).

== Cast ==
- Mithun as Chandru
- Charmy as Divya
- Bhavana as Sandhya
- Nassar as Rajasekar
- Pyramid Natarajan as Natarajan
- Devan as Ashok
- Ranjitha as Chandru's sister-in-law
- Fathima Babu as Divya's mother
- Karunas as Shankar
- Vaiyapuri as Chandru's friend
- Dhamu as Rickshaw driver
- Madhan Bob as Doctor
- P. Pandu
- M. S. Bhaskar as Rajasekar's coworker
- Crane Manohar
- Bava Lakshmanan

== Soundtrack ==
Music was composed by Vidyasagar. He introduced Sujatha Bhattacharya, better known as Madhushree, to Tamil cinema through this film.

Song title	Singers	Lyrics
"Ahaa Ethanai Azhagu"	Srinivas, Sujatha	Pa. Vijay
"Nilavile Nilavile"	Udit Narayan, Madhushree	Yugabharathi
"Aattukutty Ellam"	Tippu	Na. Muthukumar
"Kaadu Pathikichi"	Gangai Amaran, Pop Shalini	Arivumathi
"Kannu Rendum Konda"	Anuradha Sriram, Gopal Rao	Kabilan

== Critical reception ==
Sify wrote, "This is yet another stale love story, which is far from having logic or sense". Malini Mannath Chennai Online wrote "It's a fairly average entertainer, but what is commendable is that the director does not waste much time in moving the story forward, by too many of those 'accidental encounter' type of scenes. He keeps the pace going, removing each hurdle as it crops up in the story, and moves to the climax briskly". Malathi Rangarajan of The Hindu wrote, "Little else can be said about a film that has neither major gaffes nor unforgettable highlights". R. S. Anthanan of Tamilcinema.com called the film as just another pebble taken from the ocean of love.
