= S5 No Exit =

- Directed by: Sunny Komalapati
- Written by: Kalyan Chakravarthi (dialogues)
- Screenplay by: Sunny Komalapati
- Story by: Sunny Komalapati
- Produced by: Aduri Prathap Reddy; Goutham Kondepudi; Devu Samuel; Shaik Raheem
- Starring: Taraka Ratna; P. Sai Kumar; Ali; Sunil; Prince Cecil
- Cinematography: Garudavega Anji
- Edited by: Garry BH
- Music by: Mani Sharma
- Production company: Saaga Entertainments
- Release date: 30 December 2022
- Country: India
- Language: Telugu

S5 No Exit is a 2022 Indian Telugu-language political thriller film directed by Sunny Komalapati and starring Taraka Ratna, P. Sai Kumar, Ali, Sunil and Prince Cecil. The music was composed by Mani Sharma. The film released after a two-year delay on 30 December 2022 and marked Taraka Ratna's final film role before his death on 18 February 2023.

== Cast ==
- Taraka Ratna as Subbu
- P. Sai Kumar as CM Subrahmanyam Naidu
- Ali as Sambasiva Rao
- Sunil as Suleman Khan
- Prince Cecil as Sunny
- Avanthika Hari
- Suresh Varma
- Mehaboob Dilse
- Ruthuza Sawant
- Raghu Karumanchi
- Sanjay
- Fish Venkat
- Ramana Reddy

== Soundtrack ==
The music was composed by Mani Sharma and released by Aditya Music.

Track listing
No.	Title	Lyrics	Singer(s)	Length
1.	"I am an Indian"	Kalyan Chakravarthy	Sreerama Chandra	4:00
2.	"Title Song Glimpse"	—	—	0:27
3.	"Bhayanikaina Maha Bhayam"	Kalyan Chakravarthy	Anurag Kulkarni	4:22
Total length:				8:49

== Reception ==
A critic from The Times of India wrote that "Despite a stellar cast, this horror thriller is a dud and a waste of talent. A few minutes at the beginning and the end pique one’s interest and the rest of the story in the middle fails to deliver". A critic from 123telugu wrote that "On the whole, S5-No Exit is an unimpressive thriller because of its poor content and over-the-top performances. Some comedy scenes are okay to enjoy but the rest of the film has nothing to engage audiences". A critic from NTV gave the film a rating of 1 1/2 out of 5 stars. A critic from Filmibeat wrote that "S5 No Exit is a solid political thriller made with elements of politics, comedy, action and suspense. It is a small film with good production values. Those who like political thrillers will like this movie".
