= Guri (2004 film) =

- DVD cover
- Directed by: Bharat
- Written by: Bharat
- Story by: Bharati Babu
- Produced by: Talamanchi Narasa Reddy; Yogananda Sharma (presenter)
- Starring: Srihari; Vadde Naveen; Sanghavi
- Cinematography: Thota M. Naidu
- Music by: Suresh
- Production company: Sri Dakshayani Creations
- Release date: 5 March 2004
- Country: India
- Language: Telugu

Guri (transl. Target) is 2004 Indian Telugu-language action drama film directed by Bharat and starring Srihari, Vadde Naveen and Sanghavi.

The film was released to negative reviews and was a box office failure.

== Cast ==
- Srihari as Subhash Chandra Bose
- Vadde Naveen as Ashoka Chakravarthy
- Sanghavi as Saira Bhanu
- Puneet Issar as Minister
- Dharmavarapu Subramanyam as Home Minister of Andhra Pradesh
- Subbaraya Sharma as Subash Chandra Bose's father
- Ponnambalam as Seed supplier

== Production ==
The film began shooting in November of 2003.

== Soundtrack ==
The soundtrack was composed by Suresh.

All lyrics are written by Bharathi Babu.

Track listing
No.	Title	Singer(s)	Length
1.	"Nelamma Nelamma"	Srikanth	6:54
2.	"Chituku Chituku"	Srikanth	6:02
3.	"Guri"	Srikanth, Lalitha Sagari	7:05
4.	"Cheli Sakhi"	Srikanth, Nitya Santhoshini	6:22
5.	"Kaala Nethralatho"	Srikanth	2:13
6.	"Vanchana Chesi"	Srikanth	2:03
7.	"Prajalandariki"	Srikanth	2:02
8.	"Unnanu Neeku Thodaga"	Srihari, Gayathri	3:49
Total length:			36:30

== Reception ==
A critic from Idlebrain.com rated the film 1 1/2 out of 5 and wrote that "The positive points of the film are Srihari's performance and the main flashback episode. The narration of this film is very contrived. This film suffers from bad direction and screenplay". A critic from Sify wrote that "Srihari is back after a long break in this age-old revenge saga which is an action packed drama. This rehashed story has no sense or logic and has no twists in the climax". A critic from Full Hyderabad wrote that "Guri is completely a one-man show. That doesn't mean that there was only a single person in the entire theater. It means that it's Srihari all the way. He's given a good performance".
