= Kanchana Ganga (2004 film) =

- VCD cover
- Directed by: Rajendra Singh Babu
- Written by: Rajendra Singh Babu
- Produced by: Vijaylakshmi Singh; Dushyant Singh; Jai Jagadish
- Starring: Shiva Rajkumar; Sridevi Vijaykumar; Jai Jagadish; Sumalatha
- Cinematography: B. C. Gowrishankar
- Edited by: S. Manohar
- Music by: S. A. Rajkumar
- Production company: Lakshmi Creations
- Release date: 24 December 2004
- Running time: 149 minutes
- Country: India
- Language: Kannada

Kanchana Ganga is a 2004 Kannada-language romantic drama film directed and written by Rajendra Singh Babu and produced by Vijayalakshmi Singh, Dushyant Singh and Jai Jagadish. The film stars Shiva Rajkumar and Sridevi Vijaykumar along with Jai Jagadish, Parvin Dabbas, Sumalatha and Arjun in other pivotal roles. The film was the last work of veteran cinematographer B. C. Gowrishankar who died before the release of the film.

The film featured original score and soundtrack composed and written by S. A. Rajkumar. The film received the Karnataka State Award for best Costume design special award for the year 2004–05.

== Cast ==
- Shiva Rajkumar as Soorya
- Sridevi Vijaykumar as Urmila
- Jai Jagadish
- Arjun (Firoz Khan)
- Sumalatha
- Parvin Dabbas
- Sadhu Kokila
- Raju Ananthaswamy
- Chaitra
- Neelam

== Production ==
The filming was held at Kulu-Manali, Chennai, Hyderabad, Bangalore, Mysore and Madikeri.

== Soundtrack ==
The music was composed by S. A. Rajkumar and the audio was sold on Ashwini Audio label. A popular title song from the film Naa Ninna Mareyalare was reused in the soundtrack.

Track listing
No.	Title	Lyrics	Singer(s)	Length
1.	"Prema Prema"	R. N. Jayagopal	S. P. Balasubrahmanyam
2.	"Prema Prema"	R. N. Jayagopal	Sujatha
3.	"Kill You"	Kaviraj	Shankar Mahadevan
4.	"Aishwarya Aishwarya"	Kaviraj	Tippu
5.	"Noorondu Chooragi"	K. Kalyan	Sadhana Sargam
6.	"Sooryana Kirana"	K. Kalyan	Sonu Nigam, Vaishali
7.	"Ninna Mareyalare (remix)"	K. Kalyan	Udit Narayan, Mahalakshmi Iyer

== Critical reception ==
Viggy wrote "Kanchanaganga is worth watching if you are not particular about realism. A must watch film of Shivarajkumar fans and for those who wants to see splendid Kulu-Manali at its best!". Indiainfo wrote "Music by Rajkumar is just about okay and has nothing new to offer though the picturisation of the songs are good indeed. What needs to be mentioned most is late Gourishankar's photography. The camera work is simply amazing and is the highlight of the film. In short, Kanchanaganga has nothing novel to offer and fails to 'entertain' the audience". Deccan Herald wrote "The film has all the commercial elements like action, romance and comedy scenes. The story is not new. But it takes takes an interesting turn when Surya’s ‘past’ is revealed and Rahul’s character is introduced and when the latter’s motives are disclosed in the second half. Surya’s childhood story seems to be far from reality. Shivaraj, in a different get-up, is as usual at his best. Debutante actress Sridevi has put in a good effort. But same cannot be said about model Praveen Dabas. S A Rajkumar has scored the music. The song — Premaprema endare entha sambhrama is melodius. Camerawork by late B C Gowrishankar, particularly in Kulu and Manali and the song Na ninna marelayare (Remixed version) is really good".
