= Dhanush (film) =

Indian Telugu-language action film

- DVD cover
- Directed by: Nallamothu Sreenivasa Rao
- Written by: Satyanand (dialogues)
- Screenplay by: Nallamothu Sreenivasa Rao
- Story by: MS Maheswar
- Produced by: D Peddababu
- Starring: Vadde Navveen; Kiran Gill
- Cinematography: Vijaya Sri
- Music by: Dhina
- Production company: Prasanthi Films
- Release date: 11 April 2003
- Country: India
- Language: Telugu

Dhanush is a 2003 Indian Telugu-language action film directed by Nallamothu Sreenivasa Rao in his directorial debut and starring Vadde Navveen and Kiran Gill.

== Cast ==
- Vadde Navveen as Dhanush / Deva
- Kiran Gill as Jyoti
- Sivaji Raja as Rambabu
- Brahmanandam
- Narra Venkateswara Rao
- Jeevi
- Surya as the sub-inspector
- Jackie
- Rajiv Kanakala as Vicky
- Ravi Sekhar
- Dharmavarapu Subramanyam
- Raghu Babu
- Vasu
- Bandla Ganesh
- Ananth
- Kavitha as the college principal
- Krishna Sri
- Ramya
- Latha
- Deepa

== Production ==
Vadde Naveen rechristened himself as Vadde Navveen. The film was shot at the Gaayam house and Dr. B.R. Ambedkar Open University.

== Soundtrack ==
The music was composed by Dhina.

Track listing
No.	Title	Lyrics	Singer(s)	Length
1.	"Chinna Papa"	Bhuvana Chandra	Prasanna, Shankar Mahadevan	4:42
2.	"Malli Malli Neetho"	Suddala Ashok Teja	S. P. Balasubrahmanyam, Usha	5:02
3.	"Nuvvante"	Chirravuri Vijaykumar	Mano, Radhika	4:18
4.	"Oh Yerrra Bugga Pilla"	Suddala Ashok Teja	Koti, Karthik	4:29
5.	"Welcome Saranguda"	Bhuvana Chandra	Mahathi	4:54
Total length:				23:25

== Release and reception ==
As of March 2003, the film was lying in the cans awaiting release for nine months. Gudipoodi Srihari of The Hindu wrote, "The script is very weak. Navveen fails to impress as Dhanush in the scenes where he has to show the difference between a normal man and one who has lost his memory. And the scenes that make him regain that faculty look farcical".
