= Postman (2000 film) =

- DVD Cover
- Directed by: Muppalaneni Siva
- Written by: Paruchuri Brothers (dialogues)
- Screenplay by: Muppalaneni Siva
- Story by: Vishnuvardhan Babu
- Produced by: Mohan Babu
- Starring: Mohan Babu; Soundarya; Raasi
- Cinematography: K. S. Prakash
- Music by: Vandemataram Srinivas
- Production company: Sree Lakshmi Prasanna Pictures
- Release date: 13 January 2000
- Country: India
- Language: Telugu

Postman is a 2000 Indian Telugu-language family drama film directed by Muppalaneni Siva and starring Mohan Babu, Soundarya and Raasi.

== Plot ==
Vishnu, a postman in Hyderabad, is adored by all, and Sirisha develops feelings for him. However, he loves Archana, who is imprisoned in connection with a bomb explosion case. A series of events leads to a tragic climax: Archana is killed during their wedding, and Vishnu continues to carry out his postman duties, grief-stricken.

== Cast ==
- Mohan Babu as Vishnu
- Soundarya as Archana
- Raasi as Sirisha
- Kota Srinivasa Rao as Ramkoti
- AVS
- M. S. Narayana
- Brahmanandam
- Ali
- Sudhakar

== Soundtrack ==
The songs were composed by Vandemataram Srinivas and released under the label Supreme Recording.

Track listing
No.	Title	Lyrics	Singer(s)	Length
1.	"Lahiri Lahiri"	Suddala Ashok Teja	Udit Narayan, K. S. Chitra
2.	"Acha Tenugula"	Ghantadi Krishna	K. J. Yesudas, Sujatha
3.	"Nenoka Poolamokka"	Jandhyala Papayya Sastry	K. J. Yesudas
4.	"Kuku Kokilamma"	Guru Charan	K. J. Yesudas, K. S. Chitra
5.	"Oolu Daralalo"	Jandhyala Papayya Sastry	K. J. Yesudas
6.	"Bava Bava Laggam"	Suddala Ashok Teja	Udit Narayan, Swarnalatha
7.	"Ichotanee..."	Gurram Jashuva	K. J. Yesudas
8.	"Manushullo Gentleman"	Jonnavithula	Udit Narayan, Swarnalatha
9.	"Veshamu Vesi"	Jandhyala Papayya Sastry	K. J. Yesudas
10.	"Rajahamsa Cheera"	Suddala Ashok Teja	K. J. Yesudas, K. S. Chitra

== Release and reception ==
The film released on 13 January 2000, coinciding with Sankranti, alongside Kalisundam Raa and Vamsoddharakudu. The film was a box office failure.

The film was reviewed by Zamin Ryot. Jeevi of Idlebrain.com gave the film a rating of four out of five and wrote that "It has got all the ingredients one expect from a good film. There is a treat for the Telugu language lovers in this film".
