= Dance Jodi Dance Juniors =

- Genre: Dance show Reality
- Based on: Dance Jodi Dance
- Presented by: Deepak Dinkar
- Judges: Sneha; Sudha Chandran; Laila
- Country of origin: India
- Original language: Tamil
- No. of seasons: 1
- No. of episodes: 45

Production
- Camera setup: Multi-camera
- Running time: approx. 55-60 minutes per episode

Original release
- Network: Zee Tamil
- Release: 25 November 2018 – 4 May 2019

Related
- Dance Jodi Dance

Dance Jodi Dance Juniors is a 2018-2019 Indian Tamil-language children's dance competition reality television show, that aired on Zee Tamil from 25 November 2018 to 4 May 2019 on every Saturday and Sunday at 6:30PM and streamed on ZEE5. This is the junior version of the Dance Jodi Dance show, which premiered in 2016. The show about two children's contestants were going to dance together to win the trophy of Dance Jodi Dance Juniors. The show was judged by Sneha, Sudha Chandran and Laila. Deepak Dinkar as the host and featured a guest every week. The winner of the season was Nowfal and Darshan.

== Judges and hosts ==
=== Judges ===
Judges	Notes
Sudha Chandran	Indian Bharatanatyam dancer and actress who appears in Indian television and films.
Sneha	Indian actress who works primarily in Tamil film industry and Telugu film industry.
Laila	Indian actress. She has acted predominantly in Tamil films.

=== Host ===
Host	Notes
Deepak Dinkar	Tamil actor and television presenter.

== Contestants ==
Finalists

The grand finale took place on 4 May 2019, Radhika Sarathkumar was the special guest at the grand finale of the show. Nowfal and Darshan emerged as the winners while Santosh and Dhanush emerged as the runner up of the season.

Finalists	Winners	Amount won
Nowfal & Darshan	Title winners	₹5,00,000
Santosh & Dhanush	Second runner-up	₹3,00,000
Rajesh & Dheeraj	Third runner-up	₹2,00,000

Contestants

#	Contestants
1	Rajesh & Dheeraj
2	Jayaseelan & Surya Teja
3	Janani & Ruth
4	Arman-Rohan
5	Tamilalake & Amirtha
6	Seenu & Pawankalyan
7	Dinesh & Naveen
8	Dharshan & Nowfal
9	Santhosh & Danush
10	Dhanyasree & Megha
11	Rakshith & Sree Sumanth
12	Nithya & Dakshatha
