= 10th Class Diaries =

2022 film by Garudavega Anji

- Theatrical release poster
- Directed by: Anji
- Story by: Vennela Ramarao
- Produced by: Achut Rama Rao P. Ravi Teja Manyam
- Starring: Sriram; Avika Gor; Srinivasa Reddy; Vennela Ramarao; Himaja; Archana
- Cinematography: Anji
- Edited by: Prawin Pudi
- Music by: S. Chinna
- Production companies: Anvitha Avani Kreation; SR Movie Makers
- Distributed by: Ajay Mysore Productions
- Release date: 1 July 2022
- Country: India
- Language: Telugu

10th Class Diaries is a 2022 Indian Telugu-language coming-of-age romantic comedy film directed and filmed by Garudavega Anji (in his directorial debut) from a story written by Vennela Ramarao. The film stars Sriram, Avika Gor, Srinivasa Reddy, Ramarao, Himaja and Archana.

10th Class Diaries was theatrically released on 1 July 2022.

== Plot ==
Somu is an affluent NRI who returns from the US for a reunion with his schoolmates in India. When his childhood sweetheart Chandini doesn't turn up, Somu continues his search for her.

== Cast ==
- Sriram as Somayaji a.k.a. Somu
- Avika Gor as Chandini
  - TikTok Nithyasree as young Chandini
- Srinivasa Reddy as Half Boil
- Himaja as Nagalakshmi
- Vennela Ramarao as Gourav
- Archana as Soumya
- Nassar as Chandini's father
- Rajeswari Nair
- Siva Balaji
- Madhumitha
- Sanjay Swaroop as Psychiatrist
- Bhanu
- Rohini
- Satya Krishnan as Gourav's wife
- Thagubothu Ramesh
- Gemini Suresh
- Ambati Srinivas
- Jabardast Ramu
- Chitram Srinu
- Jabardast Borababu
- Ganapati
- Shivaji Raja
- Rupa Lakshmi

== Production ==
The film began production in early 2021. Anji and Sriram were to work together on a Tamil film and came together instead for this film, which is based on an event in producer Achut Ramarao's life. This film marks the directorial debut of cinematographer Anji and is his 50th film as a cinematographer. The film is about the reunion of 10th standard classmates. Avika Gor plays a character older than herself. The film was shot in Chikmagalur, Hyderabad, Rajahmundry, Sri Lanka and the United States.

== Music ==
The music for the film was composed by S. Chinna.

Track listing
No.	Title	Lyrics	Singer(s)	Length
1.	"Silaka Silaka"	Kasarla Shyam	Revanth	4:09
2.	"Egirey Egirey"	Suresh Gangula	Chinmayi Sripaada	4:22
3.	"Piya Piya"	Kasarla Shyam	Yasaswi Kondepudi	4:32
4.	"Kurravada Kurravada"	Kasarla Shyam	Nutana Mohan	3:27
5.	"Yenneno Andhala Bangaru Chiluka"	Chaitanya Prasad	Mangli	3:13
Total length:				19:43

== Release and reception ==
10th Class Diaries was theatrically released on 1 July 2022. Initially, the film was scheduled to be released on 4 March 2022. It was later pushed back to 24 June 2022, before postponing to the current date.

A critic from The Times of India opined that "What works in favour of the film is its light-hearted humour, the effervescent feeling of love, cinematic and peppy vibe after the interval and impressive performances by the lead and supporting actors".

Calling it "mixed memories," a reviewer from NTV appreciated the storyline and cinematography but pointed out uninspiring screenplay and music as its minus points. Sanju of Sakshi felt that despite faltering at times, Anji has succeeded in delivering a good film in his directorial debut. Aithagoni Raju of Asianet News Telugu opined that 10th Class Diaries takes the viewers down their memory lanes. In a more critical review, ABP Desam rated 1/5, writing that the screenplay tests the patience of the audience.
