= Archana Shastry =

Indian Actress

- Aa Dinagalu(2007) - Kannada Movie Heroin
- Born: Archana Shastry; Hyderabad, Andhra Pradesh, India (now in Telangana, India)
- Other name: Vedha
- Occupation: Actress
- Years active: 2004-present
- Spouse: Jagadeesh Bakthavachalam (m. 2019)

Archana Shastry is an Indian actress known for her work predominantly in Telugu films.

== Career ==
Debuting as Veda in the Telugu film Tapana (2004), she subsequently changed her stage name to Archana. She starred in films such as Nuvvostanante Nenoddantana (2005) in Telugu and Aa Dinagalu (2007) in Kannada. She was one of the contestants in the first season of Bigg Boss.

== Personal life ==
In November 2019, she married Jagadeesh Bakthavachalam, vice president of a health-care company.

== Filmography ==
=== Films ===
Year	Film	Role	Language	Notes
2004	Tapana	Ridhima	Telugu	Credited as Veda
2004	Nenu	Divya	Telugu	Credited as Veda
2004	Konchem Touchlo Vunte Cheputanu	Alakananda	Telugu	
2004	Suryam	Swati	Telugu	
2005	Nuvvostanante Nenoddantana	Lalitha	Telugu	Nominated-Filmfare Award for Best Supporting Actress – Telugu
2006	Lanka		Malayalam	
2006	Tanu	Tanmai	Telugu	
2006	Kokila	Sasi	Telugu	
2006	Sri Ramadasu	Seeta	Telugu	
2006	Pournami	Pournami and Chandrakala's ancestress	Telugu	
2006	Samanyudu	Aparna	Telugu	
2007	Athili Sattibabu LKG		Telugu	
2007	Agaram	Archana	Tamil	
2007	Yamadonga	Menaka	Telugu	
2007	Aa Dinagalu	Mallika	Kannada	
2007	Vegam	Archana	Tamil	
2008	Pandurangadu		Telugu	
2009	Bank		Telugu	
2009	Minchu	Baddi Maadevi	Kannada	
2009	Thamizhagam		Tamil	
2010	Ramdev		Telugu	
2010	Khaleja		Telugu	
2010	Broker	TV9 Reporter	Telugu	
2010	Meghavarshini		Kannada	
2011	Parama Veera Chakra	Mandodari	Telugu	
2012	Kulumanali	Aparna	Telugu	
2013	Karuppampatti	Herself	Tamil	Item number
2013	Balupu	Herself	Telugu	
2014	Kamalatho Naa Prayanam	Kamala Rani	Telugu	
2014	Prematho Nuvvu Vastavani		Telugu	Double role
2014	Maha Bhakta Siriyala		Telugu	
2014	Panchami		Telugu	
2015	Lion	Hare Krishna Dancer	Telugu	
2015	Mythri	Mahadev's wife	Kannada	
2015	Tharuvatha Katha		Telugu	
2017	The Final Exit	Herself	Hindi	
2019	Jessie	Jessie	Telugu	
2019	Vajra Kavachadhara Govinda	MLA	Telugu	
2022	10th Class Diaries	Soumya	Telugu	
2024	Krishnamma	A mother	Telugu	

=== Television ===
Year	Show	Role	Channel	Result
2017	Bigg Boss 1	Herself	Star Maa	5th Place
