= Swapnalokam =

1999 Indian Telugu-language film

- Poster
- Directed by: Bhimaneni Srinivasa Rao
- Written by: Story & Screenplay: Pankaj Advani; Kundan Shah; Dialogues: Ramesh-Gopi
- Based on: Kabhi Haan Kabhi Naa (1994)
- Produced by: M. Narasimha Rao
- Starring: Jagapathi Babu; Raasi; Rahul
- Cinematography: Jasti Uday Bhaskar
- Edited by: Gowtham Raju
- Music by: Vandemataram Srinivas
- Production company: Raasi Movies
- Release date: 26 February 1999
- Running time: 140 minutes
- Country: India
- Language: Telugu

Swapnalokam (transl. World of Swapna – transl. Dreamworld) is a 1999 Indian Telugu-language romantic drama film directed by Bhimaneni Srinivasa Rao and produced by M. Narasimha Rao under the banner of Raasi Movies. The film stars Jagapathi Babu and Raasi in lead roles. The film's music was composed by Vandemataram Srinivas. It is a remake of the 1994 Hindi film Kabhi Haan Kabhi Naa directed by Kundan Shah. The film failed at the box office.

== Plot ==
The film revolves around Kasi, a carefree and kind-hearted young man in love with his childhood friend Swapna. Despite his affections, Swapna is unaware of Kasi’s feelings and becomes romantically involved with Sanjay. The story explores Kasi’s struggles with unrequited love, his attempts to win Swapna’s heart, and his journey of self-discovery. The narrative is set against a lighthearted and emotional backdrop, interspersed with moments of humour and drama.

== Cast ==
- Jagapathi Babu as Kasi
- Raasi as Swapna
- Rahul as Sanjay
- Chandra Mohan
- Kota Srinivasa Rao as Kasi's father
- Sudhakar
- Brahmanandam
- Ali
- Srihari as Don Bosco
- K. Chakravarthy
- M. S. Narayana
- Siva Parvathi
- Sudha
- Ananth
- Tirupathi Prakash
- Bandla Ganesh
- Narsing Yadav
- Subbaraya Sarma
- Jenny
- Ram Veerapaneni
- Vidya as dancer (cameo appearance)

== Production ==
The film was directed by Bhimaneni Srinivasa Rao, known for his work on remakes. The story, originally written by Pankaj Advani and Kundan Shah, was adapted into Telugu by writers Ramesh-Gopi. Production of the film was underway by December 1998. Principal photography and post-production were executed on a tight schedule, enabling the film to meet its planned release in February 1999.

Two songs were filmed in Switzerland in the first schedule while other songs were picturised at Malaysia, and Singapore, featuring Jagapathi Babu and Raasi. The second schedule begun at Vishakapatnam on 16 November 1998 and ended on 30 November 1998.

The project marked the debut of Richard Rishi, credited as Rahul, in a lead role as an adult following his earlier appearances as a child actor.

== Music ==
The soundtrack of Swapnalokam was composed by Vandemataram Srinivas and released under Supreme Music label. The lyrics were penned by Sirivennela Seetharama Sastry and Chandrabose.

No.	Title	Lyrics	Singer(s)	Length
1.	"Premisthunna Premisthunna"	Chandrabose	Hariharan	4:23
2.	"Amitabh Bachchan Height"	Chandrabose	Udit Narayan, Sarada	4:20
3.	"Gagana Seemaladire Maa Inta"	Sirivennela	S. P. Balasubrahmanyam, Swarnalatha	4:34
4.	"Suprabhatamlo Melukunnana"	Sirivennela	S. P. Balasubrahmanyam	4:36
5.	"Manasannadi Naakunnadi"	Chandrabose	S. P. Balasubrahmanyam	4:46
6.	"Beautiful, Beautiful"	Chandrabose	Udit Narayan	5:02
Total length:				27:41

== Reception ==
Griddaluru Gopal Rao of Zamin Ryot disliked Jagapathi Babu's acting while praising that of Rahul's and Vandemataram Srinivas' music.
