= Keshava Chandra Ramavath =

2024 Indian Telugu-language film by Anji

- Theatrical release poster
- Directed by: Anji
- Story by: Naveen Kola
- Produced by: Rocking Rakesh
- Starring: Rocking Rakesh; Annanya Krishnan
- Cinematography: Anji
- Edited by: Madhu
- Music by: Charan Arjun
- Production companies: Green Tree Productions; Vibudhi Creations; Garudavega Makings
- Release date: 22 November 2024
- Country: India
- Language: Telugu

KCR: Keshava Chandra Ramavath is a 2024 Indian Telugu-language drama film directed by Anji and written by Rocking Rakesh, who plays the titular role alongside Annanya Krishnan.

The film was released on 22 November 2024.

== Plot ==
Nothing

== Cast ==
- Rocking Rakesh as Keshava Chandra Ramavath (KCR)
  - Rohan Roy as Young Keshava Chandra Ramavath (KCR)
- Annanya Krishnan as Manju
- Tanikella Bharani
- Thagubothu Ramesh
- Krishna Bhagavaan
- Dhanraj
- Jordar Sujatha
- Mime Madhu as Bheemla Nayak
- Lohit Kumar
- Racha Ravi
- Anji

== Music ==
The background score and soundtrack is composed by Charan Arjun. The audio rights were acquired by Aditya Music.

All music is composed by Charan Arjun.

Track list
No.	Title	Lyrics	Singer(s)	Length
1.	"Yadi Yadi"	Kasarla Shyam	Ram Miriyala, Veeha, Kanakavva	4:29
2.	"Telangana Tejam"	Goreti Venkanna	Goreti Venkanna, Mano, Kalpana, Veeha, Charan Arjun	5:36
3.	"Hyderabad"	Charan Arjun	Saketh Komanduri, Charan Arjun	4:46
4.	"Sinna Paanam"	Charan Arjun	Charan Arjun, Deepti Bhogaraju	5:50

== Release and reception ==
Keshava Chandra Ramavath was released on 22 November 2024.

Namasthe Telangana gave a rating of 3.5 out of 5 and praised the performance of lead cast and the direction.
