= Nee Premakai =

- Directed by: Muppalaneni Shiva
- Screenplay by: Muppalaneni Shiva
- Story by: Sreenivasan; Satheesh
- Produced by: D. Ramanaidu
- Starring: Abbas; Vineeth; Laya
- Cinematography: V. Jayaram
- Edited by: K. V. Krishna Reddy
- Music by: S. A. Rajkumar
- Production company: Suresh Productions
- Release date: 1 March 2002
- Country: India
- Language: Telugu

Nee Premakai (transl. For your love) is a 2002 Indian Telugu-language romantic drama film written by Sreenivasan, directed by Muppalaneni Shiva and produced by D. Ramanaidu under Suresh Productions. The film is an adaptation to Priyadarshan's 1988 Malayalam film Mukunthetta Sumitra Vilikkunnu. The film starred Abbas, Vineeth, and Laya. Muppalaneni Shiva received the Nandi Award for Best Screenplay Writer for this film.

== Story ==
Srinivas and Prabhu are roommates. Srinivas is a sincere guy working in BATA as manager. Prabhu is a parasite, who uses the money and room of Srinivas for his own luxury. The men have a pious and beautiful neighbor, Anjali. Srinivas sincerely loves her. Srinivas sends ₹ 10,000 for Anjali as an anonymous well-wisher to pay for MCA education for Anjali, since her father cannot afford that. Prabhu takes the credit by pretending to be the anonymous donor. Prabhu exploits Srinivas and uses it to attract Anjali. Meanwhile, Prabhu creates such a situation where Anjali starts hating Srinivas. A relative of Srinivas talks with Anjali's parents they agree to Anjali and Srinivas's wedding. But when Anjali discovers this, she says that she is in love with Prabhu. Anjali's parents alter their decision and decide to have her marry Prabhu.

== Cast ==
- Abbas as Prabhu
- Vineeth as Srinivas
- Laya as Anjali
- Sonia Agarwal as Priya, Harischandra Prasad's granddaughter
- D. Ramanaidu as Dr. Prakash
- Kaikala Satyanarayana as Harischandra Prasad
- Chandramohan as Anjali's father
- Brahmanandam as Babai
- Sudhakar as Anjali's uncle
- AVS as Aachaari
- Vizag Prasad
- Manorama as Srinivas' mother
- Kavitha as Anjali's mother
- Sana
- Anitha Chowdary
- Vimalasri

== Soundtrack ==
The music was composed by S. A. Rajkumar.

Nee Premakai

Film score by S. A. Rajkumar
- Released: 2002
- Length: 27:30
- Producer: S. A. Rajkumar

No	Song title	Singers	Duration
1	"Vendi Mabbula Pallakilo"	Rajesh, Chithra	04:55
2	"Kalalu Kanna Nekai"	Sanjay, Srilekha Parthasarathy	05:02
3	"O Prema Swagatham"	Rajesh, Chithra	04:41
4	"Koti Taralaa "	Rajesh, Usha	04:22
5	"Manasannade Ledu"	S. P. Balasubrahmanyam	04:58
6	"Mandakini Mandakini"	Rajesh, Chithra	04:52

== Reception ==
Gudipoodi Srihari of The Hindu wrote, "This romantic comedy is a through entertainer, from first reel to the last, well handled by director Muppalaneni Siva. The presence of Abbas and Vineet brings back the memories of Prema Desam, also a triangular love drama, which ends with the three youngsters deciding to stay as friends". Jeevi of Idlebrain.com rated the film 3/5 and wrote, "It's a typical D Rama Naidu film, which is aimed at masses with minimum entertainment value and strong storyline coupled with good amount of sentiment". Telugu Cinema wrote "In the age of love stories Nee Premakai comes as a formula love story with old style of narration and treatment. The film is a rehash of an unsuccessful Tamil film Kabaddi Kabaddi by Pandiarajan, a disciple of Bhagyaraja. In the era of films being shot in classy and glossy styles this looks a bit shabby".

== Awards ==
Award	Category	Nominee	Result
Nandi Awards	Nandi Award for Best Screenplay Writer	Muppalaneni Shiva	Won
