= Odipolama =

- Theatrical release poster
- Directed by: Kanmani
- Produced by: V. Bharani Velan
- Starring: Parimal; Sandhya; Kota Srinivasa Rao; Suman Setty
- Cinematography: Anji
- Edited by: Suresh Urs
- Music by: D. Imman
- Production company: Sri Vaaru Films
- Release date: 25 December 2009
- Country: India
- Language: Tamil

Odipolama (transl. Shall we elope?) is a 2009 Indian Tamil-language romance film directed by Kanmani, starring newcomer, Parimal and Sandhya, whilst Kota Srinivasa Rao plays a pivotal role. The film released on 25 December 2009 and performed poorly at the box office.

== Plot ==
Visu is a computer science student who loves to spend time with his friends. Though he is initially portrayed as a bookworm, it is made known in later scenes that he is a happy-go-lucky youngster. Hailing from an affluent family, he lives his own life. He comes across Anjali, also a computer science student. Visu falls in love with Anjali. After locating her whereabouts, he moves close to her residence. But problems begin after he goes behind her. A series of events forces Anjali to elope. She takes the bus in which Visu travels. It appears that Visu and Anjali had eloped together, but that isn't the case. There are a host of interesting events and encounters between them that eventually ends on a positive note.

== Cast ==
- Parimal as Visu
- Sandhya as Anjali
- Kota Srinivasa Rao as Anjali's father
- Suman Setty as Visu's friend
- Sudha as Vasundhara
- Mahadevan as Anjali's uncle
- Thambi Ramaiah as Visu's uncle
- Raja Sridhar as Vijay
- Dhanraj as Visu's friend
- Rajyalakshmi as Anjali's mother
- Chelladurai as Store owner
- Rahasya in an item number in "Puchandi"

== Production ==
The film marked the debut of actress Sangeetha's brother Parimal, in a leading role. Sandhya lost weight to play a college student in the film.

== Soundtrack ==
The soundtrack was composed by D. Imman. A critic from Bangalore Mirror wrote that "As if to make up for his past debacles, composer Imman evolves and show promise, if only half-heartedly".

Track listing
| No. | Title | Lyrics | Singer(s) | Length |
|---|---|---|---|---|
| 1. | "Ading Ading" | D. Imman | D. Imman, Rita |
| 2. | "Aruvi Pola" | Thabu Shankar | Krish |
| 3. | "Odipolama" | Snehan | Arati Kanklikar, Dinesh Kanagaratnam |
| 4. | "Poochandi" | Snehan | Arati Kanklikar |
| 5. | "Ragalaikaara Maaman" | Snehan | D. Imman |
| 6. | "Vaalu Payyane" | Snehan | Anitha Karthikeyan, Ranjith |

== Critical reception ==
S. R. Ashok Kumar of The Hindu wrote that "Director Kanmani who is also in charge of the story, screenplay and dialogue has passed the acid test with a fair degree of success in all departments. The New Indian Express wrote that "It’s a simple script with a straight narrative style, sans any lavish trappings or frills [...] Youthful and breezy with its light touches, it’s the little twists in the screenplay that keep it going".
