= Preminche Manasu =

1999 Indian Telugu-language film directed by AVS Adi Narayana

- Directed by: AVS Adi Narayana
- Written by: P. Rajendra Kumar (dialogues)
- Screenplay by: AVS Adi Narayana
- Story by: Vincent Selva
- Based on: Priyamudan (Tamil)
- Produced by: NR Anuradha Devi; P. Karunakar Reddy; M. Damodar Reddy(presenter)
- Starring: Vadde Naveen; Keerthi Reddy
- Cinematography: K. S. Selvaraj
- Edited by: Kotagiri Venkateswara Rao
- Music by: \ S. A. Rajkumar
- Production company: Savan Productions
- Release date: 2 July 1999
- Country: India
- Language: Telugu

Preminche Manasu (transl. Loving Heart) is a 1999 Indian Telugu-language romantic psychological thriller film directed by AVS Adi Narayana and starring Vadde Naveen and Keerthi Reddy. The film is a remake of the 1998 Tamil-language film Priyamudan. It was commercially unsuccessful.

== Cast ==
- Vadde Naveen as Vasanth
- Keerthi Reddy as Shailaja
- Ravi Teja as Vasanth Kumar
- Srihari
- Chandra Mohan
- Ranganath
- Brahmanandam
- AVS
- Bandla Ganesh
- Anil
- Balaraju
- Raghunatha Reddy
- M. S. Narayana
- Babu Mohan
- Sri Lakshmi
- Sudha
- Delhi Rajeswari
- Gautam Raju
- Bhaskar
- Narsing Yadav
- Master Azhar

== Production ==
The film was launched at Ramanaidu Studios.

== Soundtrack ==
The songs are composed by S. A. Rajkumar. The lyrics were written by Sirivennela Seetharama Sastry and Chandrabose. Rajkumar went on to reuse "Evare Cheli Nuvvevare" as "Nathiye Nayil Nathiye" in Vaanathaippola, which also went on to be reused as "Kadhile Andhala Nadhi" in Maa Annayya.

No.	Title	Singer(s)	Length
1.	"Nee Choopu Chalamma"	Rajesh	4:13
2.	"Evare Cheli Nuvvevare"	Rajesh	4:59
3.	"My Dear My Dear"	Rajesh; Pop Smitha	4:05
4.	"Neeku Telusa Kada"	S. P. Balasubrahmanyam; K. S. Chitra	3:57
5.	"Mumbai Minku Bangaru"	Mano; Swarnalatha	4:24
6.	"Maaloni Maata Paata Aata"	Mano	4:34

== Release ==
The film released on 2 July 1999 with the tagline "Loving Heart". Keerthi Reddy, who became popular with Tholi Prema, failed to garner further recognition from this film and Ravoyi Chandamama and subsequently went to work in Hindi films.

== Reception ==
Griddhaluru Gopala Rao of Zamin Ryot gave the film a negative review. He noted that the first half is entertaining, but the film goes haywire in the second half. He praised the music, lyrics, picturisation in Jaipur but criticised the Telugu pronunciation of the singers, and certain plot points which he felt were unrealistic. Andhra Today wrote "The story is unique and has good roles. But the director failed to exploit to his advantage and thereby failed the audience. Even the strong bondage of love between Vasanth and Sailaja has not been well portrayed. With a little more imagination and perspective, the director could have taken the movie to better heights by making it an entertainer and the movie would have made a big hit".
