= Preethigaagi =

- DVD cover
- Directed by: S. Mahendar
- Written by: Fazil
- Screenplay by: S. Mahendar
- Based on: Aniyathipraavu (Malayalam)
- Produced by: Ramu
- Starring: Murali; Sridevi Vijaykumar
- Cinematography: Shekhar Chandra
- Edited by: P. R. Soundar Raj
- Music by: S. A. Rajkumar
- Production company: Ramu Films
- Release date: 16 March 2007
- Running time: 158 minutes
- Country: India
- Language: Kannada

Preethigagi is a 2007 Indian Kannada-language romance film directed by S. Mahendar and starring Murali and Sridevi Vijayakumar. It is a remake of the 1997 Malayalam film Aniyathipraavu. The plot is of a love story between a boy and a girl, whose relationship is not approved by their families, who eventually elope, but return to persuade their families to let them be together.

== Cast ==
- Murali as Sanju
- Sridevi Vijaykumar as Mili
- Ramakrishna as Sanju's father
- Bhavya as Sanju's mother
- Jayanthi as Mili's mother
- Avinash as Rajeev
- Chithra Shenoy
- Doddanna
- Mukhyamantri Chandru
- Shobaraj as Venkat
- Srujan Lokesh as Mili's brother
- Preethi
- Amrutha
- Master Anand as Sanju's friend
- Nagashekar
- Bank Janardhan
- Honnavalli Krishna
- Karthik Sharma

== Production ==
The film was launched at Nanditheertha temple at Bangalore in 2006. Ramu agreed to produce the film although he usually does not produce any remake films. In order to get tax exemption, the film was released ten years after the original film.

== Soundtrack ==
Preethigaagi

Soundtrack album by S. A. Rajkumar
- Released: 15 September 2006
- Recorded: 2006
- Genre: Feature film soundtrack
- Length: 34:53
- Label: Jhankar Music

S. A. Rajkumar composed the film's background score and music for its soundtrack. The track "Ennai Thalatta" from Kadhalukku Mariyadhai composed by Ilayaraja was reused as "Kanninalli". The track "Ananda" was reused from the composer's own Tamil track "Rosapoo" from Surya Vamsam while "Ee Preethi" was reused from the composer's another own Tamil track "Pirivondrai" from Piriyadha Varam Vendum (2001). The album consists of eight tracks.

Track listing
| No. | Title | Lyrics | Singer(s) | Length |
|---|---|---|---|---|
| 1. | "Ananda Nammi Maneyalli (Patho)" | K. Kalyan | Chithra, Rajkumar | 1:18 |
| 2. | "Ananda Nammi Maneyalli" | K. Kalyan | Chithra, Prasanna, S. A. Rajkumar | 4:14 |
| 3. | "Ee Preeti Manasugalu" | K. Kalyan | Chithra, Srinivas | 5:04 |
| 4. | "Kanninalli Kanaside" | K. Kalyan | Hariharan | 5:03 |
| 5. | "Midiyuthide" | K. Kalyan | Prasanna, Priya, Aanchal | 4:37 |
| 6. | "Muddadthivi Guddadthivi" | K. Kalyan | Shankar Mahadevan | 4:47 |
| 7. | "Preetiyalli Aralide" | K. Kalyan | Harini | 5:01 |
| 8. | "Ellinda Bande" | Kaviraj | Hariharan, Priya | 4:49 |
| Total length: | | | | 34:53 |

== Reception ==
A critic from Sify wrote that "Director S.Mahender has nothing new to offer story wise and could have stuck to village based films that he is famous for". A critic from Rediff.com wrote that "Preethigaagi is enjoyable for those who haven't seen the original". Chitraloka wrote "Though the film starts of slowly it generates pace midway. And from the sequences leading to the climax to the last scene, it is certainly the best part of the narration in the film. And the beauty of the film is though the film has a youthful love story, it has most of the character artists who have equal opportunities to perform. Therefore the film looks consistently good after the film gathers pace. Once the pressure builds up, then the film becomes the toast of the audience".
