= Kanmani (director) =

Indian film director

- Born: 19 June 1980 (age 46)
- Occupation: Director
- Years active: 2003-present

Kanmani is an Indian film director who has worked on Tamil and Telugu and language films. After beginning his career in Tamil films, Kanmani has experienced more success in Telugu films.

== Career ==
Kanmani completed a degree at Presidency College, Chennai before joining as a chorus singer to composer Ilaiyaraaja, and worked with him for twelve years. He then apprenticed under director Saran during the making of Gemini (2002), before making his debut with the low-budget romantic comedy Aahaa Ethanai Azhagu (2003) featuring Mithun Tejaswi and Charmy Kaur. He gained success with his next two ventures in Telugu, Naa Oopiri (2005) and Chinnodu (2006), before going on to make the social drama Call Center (2008) and the romantic comedy Odipolama (2009).

In 2015, he made the Telugu film Beeruva before beginning work on the horror comedy Peigal Jaakirathai.

== Filmography ==
Year	Film	Language	Notes
2003	Aahaa Ethanai Azhagu	Tamil	
2005	Naa Oopiri	Telugu	
2006	Chinnodu	Telugu	
2008	Call Center	Telugu	
2009	Odipolama	Tamil	
2013	Chukkalanti Ammayi Chakkanaina Abbayi	Telugu	
2013	Made In Vizag	Telugu	
2015	Beeruva	Telugu	also cameo
2016	Peigal Jaakkirathai	Tamil	
2018	Desamudurs	Telugu	
2020	Arjuna	Telugu	
