= Priya O Priya =

1997 Telugu film by Muppalaneni Shiva

- Theatrical release poster
- Directed by: Muppalaneni Shiva
- Screenplay by: Muppalaneni Shiva
- Based on: Yeh Dillagi (Hindi)
- Produced by: N. R. Anuradha Devi; K. Bhanu Prasad; P. L. N. Reddy (Presenter)
- Starring: Vadde Naveen; Abbas; Simran
- Cinematography: V. Jayaram
- Edited by: Kotagiri Venkateswara Rao
- Music by: Koti
- Production company: Jubilee International
- Release date: 26 September 1997
- Country: India
- Language: Telugu

Priya O Priya is a 1997 Indian Telugu-language romantic drama film directed by Muppalaneni Shiva. The film stars Vadde Naveen, Abbas, and Simran in lead roles. Produced by N. R. Anuradha Devi and K. Bhanu Prasad under the Jubilee International banner, the music was composed by Koti.

The film is a remake of the 1994 Hindi film Yeh Dillagi, which was inspired by the 1954 American film Sabrina, itself based on Samuel A. Taylor's 1953 play Sabrina Fair. Priya O Priya marked Abbas's debut in a straight Telugu film and was also Simran's second venture in the Telugu film industry.

The film was released on 26 September 1997. The song "Kammani Kalalaku" from the film became particularly popular.

== Plot ==
Two brothers (Vadde Naveen and Abbas), heirs to a successful business empire, fall in love with the same woman (Simran), the daughter of their family's driver. While one is infatuated, the other forms a deep connection with her. Family opposition escalates, leading to emotional turmoil. In the end, one brother sacrifices his love, allowing the other brother to unite with her.

== Cast ==
- Vadde Naveen as Krishna Chaitanya
- Abbas as Vamsi
- Simran as Priya
- Lakshmi as Vasundhara
- Chandra Mohan
- Brahmanandam
- AVS
- Sivaji Raja
- Subbaraya Sarma
- K. K. Sarma
- Kallu Chidambaram
- M. S. Narayana
- Duvvasi Mohan
- Ananth
- Jenny
- Jayaprakash Reddy

== Production ==
Priya O Priya was produced by N. R. Anuradha Devi and K. Bhanu Prasad under the banner Jubilee International. Muppalaneni Shiva directed the film and also wrote its screenplay, while the dialogues were penned by Vandavasu Vidya. The film is a remake of the 1994 Hindi movie Yeh Dillagi, which was inspired by the 1954 American film Sabrina, itself based on Samuel A. Taylor's 1953 play Sabrina Fair. The story of Sabrina had previously been adapted in Telugu as Intiki Deepam Illale in 1961.

Vadde Naveen, Abbas, and Simran were cast in the lead roles. This film marked Abbas's first straight Telugu film, following his popularity in the dubbed film Prema Desam (1996). It was also Simran's second venture in Telugu cinema following Abbai Gari Pelli (1997).

Principal photography for the film took place in Hyderabad, with major portions shot at Ramanaidu Studios, Annapurna Studios, and Padmalaya Studios. Post-production activities were conducted at Ramanaidu Studios.

== Music ==
The music for Priya O Priya was composed by Koti. Audio soundtrack was released on Aditya Music label. The song "Kammani Kalalaku (Priya O Priya)" became a standout track, gaining popularity.

Track list
No.	Title	Lyrics	Singer(s)	Length
1.	"Kammani Kalalaku (Priya O Priya)"	Bhuvana Chandra	K. S. Chithra, S. P. Balasubrahmanyam	5:26
2.	"Sweet Dreams"	Samavedam Shanmukha Sarma	Koti, K. S. Chithra	5:11
3.	"Chitapata Chinukula Vana"	Sirivennela Seetharama Sastry	K. S. Chithra, S. P. Balasubrahmanyam	5:29
4.	"Colombo Kollagotteddama"	Sirivennela Seetharama Sastry	Murali, Swarnalatha	4:24
5.	"Andamaina Brundavanam"	Chandrabose	S. P. Balasubrahmanyam, Sujatha Mohan	5:11
6.	"Cellphone Sundari"	Sriharsha	Koti, Swarnalatha	4:55
Total length:				30:36

== Release ==
Priya O Priya was released on 26 September 1997.
