= Yeh Dillagi =

- Theatrical-release poster
- Directed by: Naresh Malhotra
- Written by: Sachin Bhowmik
- Produced by: Uday Chopra
- Starring: Akshay Kumar; Kajol; Saif Ali Khan; Saeed Jaffrey
- Cinematography: Raju Kaygee
- Edited by: Naresh Malhotra
- Music by: Dilip Sen–Sameer Sen
- Production company: Yash Raj Films
- Distributed by: Yash Raj Films
- Release date: 6 May 1994
- Running time: 148 minutes
- Country: India
- Language: Hindi
- Budget: ₹2 crore
- Box office: ₹10.77 crore

Yeh Dillagi (transl. This Cheerfulness) is a 1994 Indian Hindi-language romantic comedy film directed by Naresh Malhotra and produced by Uday Chopra. Based on the 1954 American film Sabrina (itself based on Samuel A. Taylor's 1953 play Sabrina Fair), its story revolves on two brothers (Akshay Kumar and Saif Ali Khan) who both fall in love with their family driver's daughter, Sapna (Kajol), a successful model.

Yeh Dillagi released on 6 May 1994, and emerged as a commercial blockbuster, grossing ₹10.8 crore against its ₹1.6 crore budget. It received positive reviews from critics upon release, with particular praise for Kumar and Kajol's performance.

At the 40th Filmfare Awards, Yeh Dillagi received 4 nominations – Best Actor (Kumar), Best Actress (Kajol), Best Music Director (Dilip Sen, Sameer Sen) and Best Male Playback Singer (Abhijeet for the song "Ole Ole"). The film was later remade in Telugu as Priya O Priya (1997).

== Plot ==
Vijay and Vikram “Vicky” Saigal are the sons of the industrialist Bhanupratap Saigal, who heads Saigal Industries. While Vijay is a serious and hardworking executive in the family business, Vicky is carefree and impulsive. Vicky becomes infatuated with Sapna, an aspiring model and the daughter of the Saigal family’s driver, Dharampal. However, their mother, Shanti, strongly disapproves of the match because of Sapna’s social background.

Vijay initially attempts to help Vicky pursue Sapna, but in the process he falls in love with her himself, and Sapna gradually develops feelings for him as well. The brothers later discuss their feelings, although Vicky mistakenly believes that Vijay supports his efforts to win Sapna’s affection.

Meanwhile, Shanti pressures Dharampal to take Sapna away to Bombay or risk losing his job. Dharampal angrily leaves for the railway station with Sapna. When Vicky threatens to take his own life if he is not allowed to marry Sapna, Shanti reluctantly agrees to accept her. Sapna then returns to the Saigal household.

By this time, however, Vicky realises that Sapna and Vijay truly love each other. He decides to sacrifice his own feelings and brings them together. Afterwards, Vicky encounters a young woman named Anjali and is instantly attracted to her.

== Cast ==
- Akshay Kumar as Vijayendra Saigal "Vijay"
- Saif Ali Khan as Vikram Saigal "Vicky"
- Kajol as Sapna
- Reema Lagoo as Shanti Saigal
- Saeed Jaffrey as Bhanupratap Saigal
- Deven Verma as Gurdas
- Achyut Potdar as Dharampal
- Neena Softa as Sujata
- Karishma Kapoor as Anjali Kashyap (special appearance)

== Music ==
The film's soundtrack album contains seven songs composed by Dilip Sen and Sameer Sen, with lyrics written by Sameer. The song "Ole Ole", sung by Abhijeet was a hit at the music charts. The other artists who contributed to this album are Lata Mangeshkar, Kumar Sanu, Pankaj Udhas and Udit Narayan.

According to the Indian trade website Box Office India, with around 22,00,000 units sold the soundtrack became the eleventh highest-selling album of the year.

#	Title	Singer(s)	Duration
1.	"Hothon Pe Bas"	Lata Mangeshkar, Kumar Sanu	04:54
2.	"Ole Ole"	Abhijeet	04:32
3.	"Dekho Zara Dekho"	Lata Mangeshkar, Kumar Sanu	04:45
4.	"Naam Kya Hai"	Lata Mangeshkar, Kumar Sanu	03:28
5.	"Main Deewana Hoon"	Pankaj Udhas	05:07
6.	"Lagi Lagi Hai Yeh Dil Ki Lagi"	Lata Mangeshkar, Udit Narayan, Abhijeet	04:21
7.	"Gori Kalai"	Lata Mangeshkar, Udit Narayan	05:15
8.	Dance Music (Instrumental)	Instrumental	01:05

== Release ==
Yeh Dillagi was released on 6 May 1994. According to the film-trade website Box Office India, the film opened to a wide audience and emerged as a commercial success and one of the highest-grossing films of 1994. Distributed by Eros International, it was released on DVD on 8 October 2007 in a single-disc pack. It was available for streaming on Amazon Prime Video and Apple TV+ since 23 May 2017. As of February 2026, it is available to stream on Netflix.

== Reception ==
Yeh Dillagi received a positive reception from critics. On 3 June 1994, The Indian Express praised Kajol's performance, saying that "[she] looks better than she did in Baazigar (1993) and gives a believable performance". A review published by India Today on 15 June hailed: "After a season of psychopaths and avenging angels, finally, relief. Here is romance, comedy and the foot-thumping ole ole."

At the 40th Filmfare Awards, Yeh Dillagi received 4 nominations – Best Actor (Kumar), Best Actress (Kajol), Best Music Director (Dilip Sen, Sameer Sen) and Best Male Playback Singer (Abhijeet for the song "Ole Ole").
