= Tapana (film) =

2004 film

- Directed by: Tejas Dhanraj
- Produced by: Wg Cdr. Ramesh
- Starring: Prabhu Deva; Siddhu; Mahhi Vij; Seema; Archana
- Cinematography: Nolen Style
- Music by: Shambhu Prasad
- Production company: Applause Entertainment AP Pvt Ltd
- Release date: 13 February 2004
- Country: India
- Language: Telugu

Tapana is a 2004 Indian Telugu-language romantic drama film directed by Tejas Dhanraj. It stars Prabhu Deva, debutante Siddardha, Maahi and Seema. The film opened to mixed reviews in February 2004.

== Cast ==
- Prabhu Deva as Venu
- Siddardha as Siddardha "Siddhu"
- Maahi as Meera
- Seema
- Archana as Radhima
- Ali as Chiru
- Eswara Rao as Meera's father
- Duvvasi Mohan
- Vinay Varma
- Meka Ramakrishna
- Vijayabhaskar
- Raam Surapaneni
- Anant

== Production ==
The film was announced in June 2003, where Applause Entertainment Ltd revealed their maiden regional venture titled Tapana at Annapurna Studio in Banjara Hills. The film marked the debut of actress Jaya Prada's nephew Siddardha in the leading role, alongside Prabhu Deva. She had initially attempted to launch Siddardha through a bilingual venture titled Classmates in 2001, but the film did not materialise. He later made a comeback with the Tamil film Uyire Uyire, starring Hansika Motwani, during 2016.

== Soundtrack ==
An audio release event was held in December 2003 at Taj Krishna Hotel with Sonali Bendre in attendance as the chief guest.

No.	Title	Singer(s)	Length
1.	"Gundello Penchukunna"	S. P. B. Charan, Usha
2.	"Sarimapa"	Mallikarjun, Mansur
3.	"I Love My Darling"	Sekhar, Lenina Choudary
4.	"I Am In Love"	Anoop, Nishma
5.	"Nyayama Neeku Prema"	N. Srinivas
6.	"Kalalanni Theerela"	Srikanth
7.	"Happy Day"	Chakri
8.	"Chali Galilo"	N. Srinivas

== Reception ==
Tapana opened to mixed reviews in February 2004, with a critic from Idlebrain.com noting the "first half of the film does not have any story, hence is little boring. Things start rolling in second half. The film is good from the moment it is revealed that heroine is suffering with a disease". A critic from AllIndianSite.com wrote "Dhanraj's direction was not impressive, the entire film was narrated very slowly. It was more like a TV serial than a film".
