= Lakshmipati =

Epithet of Vishnu

Painting of Vishnu and Lakshmi

Lakshmipati (Sanskrit: लक्ष्मीपति, romanized: Lakṣmīpati, lit. 'Husband of Lakshmi') is an epithet of the Hindu deity Vishnu. It refers to his status of being the consort of the Hindu goddess Lakshmi, as well as being associated with her attribute of prosperity.

== Legend ==
In the Bhagavata Purana, after the events of the Samudra Manthana, the churning of the ocean of milk by the devas and the asuras, Lakshmi emerged from the ocean as the goddess of prosperity. Varuna offered her a garland of lotus buds and Vishvakarma offered her jewels to wear, and rivers such as Ganga appeared so she could bathe. After these preparations, Lakshmi garlanded Vishnu and embraced him, choosing him as her consort, which restored the natural order of the cosmos.

According to the Vishnu Purana, Lakshmi manifests herself upon the earth as the wife of each of Vishnu's avatars on earth:

Thus when Hari was born as a dwarf, the son of Aditī, Lakṣmī appeared from a lotus (as Padmā, or Kamalā); when he was born as Rāma, of the race of Bhrigu (or Paraśurāma), she was Dharaṇī; when he was Rāghava (Rāmacandra), she was Sītā; and when he was Kṛṣṇa, she became Rukminī. In the other descents of Viṣṇu, she is his associate. If he takes a celestial form, she appears as divine; if a mortal, she becomes a mortal too, transforming her own person agreeably to whatever character it pleases Viṣṇu to put on.

— Vishnu Purana, Book 1, Chapter 9

== Hymns ==
In his position as Lakshmipati, the husband of Lakshmi, Vishnu is offered a number of epithets in the Vishnu Sahasranama: Sarva-Lakshana-Lakshanyah (He who is distinguished by all the features that define him as supreme), Lakshmivan (He who is always with Lakshmi), and Samitinjayaha (The victor of battles). Each of these honorifics is accompanied by a shloka. It is recommended that Vishnu be meditated upon as he "Who is the consort of Lakshmi, who has the splendour of the inner part of a lotus, and whose hands are decorated by the Kamalalaya", the lotus that is represented as the abode of Lakshmi. He is stated to have revealed that the Ultimate Reality was a Dvaya (Duality) in the form of Lakshmi-Narayana, and that Lakshmi was as timeless as he was, as the personification of Prakriti, which he embraced in his hands.

== See also ==
- Hari
- Govinda
- Janardana
