= Sudha (actress) =

Indian actress

- Born: Hema Sudha; Srirangam, Tamil Nadu, India
- Occupation: Actress
- Years active: 1991–present
- Children: 2

Sudha (born Hema Sudha) is an Indian actress who predominantly played character roles in Telugu films. Born and brought up in Srirangam, Tamil Nadu, she has acted in around 1000 films Telugu, Tamil, Kannada, Malayalam and Hindi.

== Filmography ==
=== Telugu ===
Year	Title	Role	Notes
1991	Talli Tandrulu		
1991	Gang Leader		
1991	Rowdy Alludu		
1992	President Gari Pellam		
1992	Teja		
1993	Major Chandrakanth		
1993	Shabash Ramu		
1993	Pelli Gola		
1994	Captain		
1994	Criminal		
1994	Hello Brother		
1994	Bangaru Kutumbam		
1994	Aame		
1995	Pokiri Raja		
1995	Gharana Bullodu		
1995	Ammaleni Puttillu		
1995	Ghatotkachudu		
1995	Taj Mahal		
1995	Sankalpam		
1995	Telugu Veera Levara	Ramaraju's sister-in-law	
1996	Ramudochadu		
1996	Pellala Rajyam		
1996	Puttinti Gowravam		
1996	Akkada Ammayi Ikkada Abbayi		
1997	Subhakankshalu		
1997	Preminchukundam Raa		
1998	Pelli Peetalu		
1998	Suryudu		
1998	Srimathi Vellostha		
1999	Prema Kosam		
1999	Swayamvaram		
1999	Samudram		
1999	Sultan		
1999	Preminche Manasu		
1999	Anaganaga Oka Ammai		
1999	Naa Hrudayamlo Nidurinche Cheli		
1999	Swapnalokam		
1999	Ravoyi Chandamama		
1999	Sahasabaludu - Vichitrakoti		
2000	Kalisundam Raa		
2000	Nuvvu Vastavani		
2000	Chala Bagundi		
2000	Goppinti Alludu		
2000	Pelli Sambandham		
2000	Vamsi		
2000	Nuvve Kavali		
2000	Uncle		
2001	Tommidi Nelalu		
2001	Murari		
2001	Eduruleni Manishi		
2001	Ammayi Kosam		
2001	Ninnu Choodalani		
2001	Bava Nachadu		
2001	Nuvvu Naaku Nachav		
2001	Student No. 1		
2001	Anandam		
2001	Manasantha Nuvve		
2001	Ishtam		
2001	Sivanna		
2002	Nuvvu Leka Nenu Lenu		
2002	Kalusukovalani		
2002	Santosham		
2002	Allari		
2002	Sreeram		
2002	Manasutho		
2002	Holi		
2002	Nuvve Nuvve		
2002	Nee Sneham		
2002	Yuva Rathna		
2002	Manmadhudu		
2003	Naaga		
2003	Dil		
2003	Ottesi Cheputunna		
2003	Appudappudu		
2003	Ninne Ishtapaddanu		
2003	Oka Raju Oka Rani		
2003	Sambaram		
2003	Janaki Weds Sriram		
2003	Premayanamaha		
2003	Neeke Manasichaanu	Bhuvana	
2004	Lakshmi Narasimha		
2004	Nenunnanu		
2004	Varsham		
2004	Arya		
2004	Koduku		
2004	Kedi No.1		
2004	Pallakilo Pellikoothuru		
2004	Valliddaru Okkate		
2004	7G Brindhavan Colony		
2005	Avunanna Kaadanna		
2005	Andagadu		
2005	Bunny		
2005	Subash Chandra Bose		
2005	Bhadra		
2005	Narasimhudu	Lakshmi	
2005	Jagapati		
2005	Naa Oopiri		
2005	Athadu		
2005	Allari Bullodu		
2005	Bhageeratha		
2005	Jai Chiranjeeva		
2006	Sri Ramadasu		
2006	Pokiri		
2006	Ashok		
2006	Maa Iddari Madhya		
2006	Raja Babu		
2006	Evandoi Srivaru		
2007	Madhumasam		
2007	Yogi		
2007	Desamuduru	Janaki	
2007	Classmates		
2007	Munna		
2007	Veduka		
2007	Toss		
2007	Tulasi		
2007	Takkari		
2008	Krishna		
2008	Swagatam		
2008	Mangatayaru Tiffin Centre		
2008	Bujjigadu		
2008	Tinnama Padukunnama Tellarainda!		
2008	Bhale Dongalu		
2008	Bangaru Babu		
2008	Ready		
2008	Gorintaku		
2008	Ullasamga Utsahamga		
2008	Deepavali	Sirisha's mother	
2008	Ekaloveyudu		
2008	Andamaina Abaddam		
2008	King		
2009	Mesthri		
2009	Fitting Master		
2009	Konchem Ishtam Konchem Kashtam		
2009	Ride		
2009	Boni		
2009	Current		
2009	Ganesh Just Ganesh		
2009	Jayeebhava		
2010	Namo Venkatesa		
2010	Shambo Shiva Shambo		
2010	Adhurs		
2010	Srimathi Kalyanam		
2010	Panchakshari		
2010	Jhummandi Naadam		
2010	Don Seenu		
2010	Khaleja		
2011	Mirapakay		
2011	KSD Appalaraju		
2011	Teen Maar		
2011	Seema Tapakai		
2011	Veera		
2011	Badrinath		
2011	Dookudu		
2011	Sri Rama Rajyam		
2012	Poola Rangadu		
2012	Ishq		
2012	Nanda Nanditha		
2012	Racha		
2012	Srimannarayana		
2012	Avunu		
2013	Okkadine		
2013	Baadshah		
2013	Naayak		
2013	Gunde Jaari Gallanthayyinde		
2013	Greeku Veerudu		
2013	Something Something		
2014	Emo Gurram Egaravachu		
2014	Oka Laila Kosam		
2015	Mantra 2		
2016	Right Right		
2017	Om Namo Venkatesaya		
2017	Babu Baga Busy		
2017	Goutham Nanda		
2017	Oxygen		
2017	Mama O Chandamama		
2018	Nartanasala	Satya's mother	
2018	Ammammagarillu		
2021	30 Rojullo Preminchadam Ela	Doctor	
2021	Annapoornamma Gari Manavadu		
2021	SR Kalyanamandapam	Kalyan’s aunt	
2024	Alanaati Ramchandrudu	Savithri	
2024	Usha Parinayam	Usha’s grandmother	
2024	Utsavam		
2024	Lucky Baskhar	Sumathi's mother	

=== Tamil ===
Year	Title	Role	Notes
1984	Oh Maane Maane		
1987	Vanna Kanavugal		
1987	Enga Chinna Rasa		
1988	Guru Sishyan		
1988	Kodi Parakkuthu		
1988	En Thangachi Padichava		
1988	Manamagale Vaa		
1989	Thangamana Raasa		
1989	Penn Buthi Pin Buthi		
1990	Thiyagu		
1991	Vaa Arugil Vaa		
1991	Porkodi		
1992	Kaaval Geetham		
1992	Enga Veetu Velan		
1992	Innisai Mazhai		
1993	Ponnumani		
1994	Duet		
1995	Dear Son Maruthu		
1996	Subash		
1996	Indian		
1996	Nethaji		
2003	Arasu		
2004	7G Rainbow Colony		
2005	Mazhai		
2005	Oru Naal Oru Kanavu		
2006	Sillunu Oru Kaadhal		
2006	Kedi		
2007	Aarya		
2008	Thiruvannamalai		
2009	Kanden Kadhalai		
2009	Odipolama	Vasundhara	
2010	Theeradha Vilaiyattu Pillai		
2011	Vedi		
2012	Nanda Nanditha		
2013	Thiru Pugazh		
2015	Thani Oruvan		
2015	Vedalam		
2016	Jippaa Jimikki		
2016	24		
2017	Pagadi Aattam		
2017	143		
2020	Thiruvalar Panchankam		
2024	Romeo		
2025	Madha Gaja Raja	Jaya	
2026	Vishwanath & Sons	Ramanathan’s wife	

=== Kannada ===
Year	Title	Role	Notes
1996	Gulabi		
1996	Rangoli		
1997	Thayi Kotta Seere		
2009	Meravanige		
2018	Kanaka		
2023	Kabzaa		

=== Malayalam ===
Year	Title	Role	Notes
1995	Aksharam		
1996	Yuvathurki		
1998	Thattakam		
1999	Thachiledathu Chundan		
2003	Balettan		

=== Hindi ===
Year	Title	Role	Notes
1992	Aaj Ka Goonda Raj		
2001	Love Ke Liye Kuch Bhi Karega		

=== Television ===
Year	Title	Role	Language	Channel
	Anbulla Amma		Tamil	
1998	Jannal Sila Nijangal Sila Nyayangal		Tamil	Sun TV
	Adhiparasakthi		Tamil	Rajshri Tamil
2020	Chitti Talli	Jayammma	Telugu	Star Maa
2020	Nachiyarpuram	Santhakumari	Tamil	Zee Tamil
2020-2021	Poove Unakkaga	Rajalakshmi Shivanarayanan	Tamil	Sun TV
2021	Mrs. Hitler	Bhanumathi	Malayalam	Zee Keralam
