= Dheena =

2001 film by A. R. Murugadoss

- Film poster
- Directed by: A. R. Murugadoss
- Written by: A. R. Murugadoss
- Produced by: P. Karthikeyan
- Starring: Ajith Kumar; Suresh Gopi; Laila
- Cinematography: Aravind Kamalanathan
- Edited by: Suresh Urs
- Music by: Yuvan Shankar Raja
- Production company: Vijayam Cine Combines
- Release date: 14 January 2001
- Running time: 167 minutes
- Country: India
- Language: Tamil

Dheena is a 2001 Indian Tamil-language action thriller film written and directed by A. R. Murugadoss (in his directorial debut). It stars Ajith Kumar, Suresh Gopi and Laila in the lead roles. The music and background score are composed by Yuvan Shankar Raja and cinematography by K. Aravind. The film marked Suresh Gopi's Tamil debut.

Dheena was released on 14 January 2001 and became a major commercial success. It marked the beginning of a new image of Ajith Kumar, that of an action hero, and he earned his nickname, Thala (leader), from this film.

== Plot ==
The film starts with the police arresting Aathikesavan's men as suspects for burning Minister Malarvannan's liquor shop. Aathi sends Dheenadhayalan aka Dheena, his adopted brother, to attack the false witnesses in this case and bail his men out. This leads to further conflicts between Aathi, Dheena and Malarvannan and Dheena ends up chopping off Malarvannan's hand.

Meanwhile, Dheena falls in love with a girl named Chitra. After a bit of pursuing and getting to know one another, they fall in love, and even when Chitra learns that Dheena is involved in rowdyism, she stands by her decision to be with him because of Dheena's essentially good character. Meanwhile, Dheena learns that Ashok has teased his sister Shanthi and thrashes him. A little later, he finds that Ashok has again given a love letter to Shanthi and beats him up, but learns that he is Chitra's brother. Chitra tells Dheena that Shanthi is also in love with Ashok. Dheena realizes this misunderstanding and agrees to help them get married. Finding difficulties in obtaining Aathi's permission, Shanthi elopes with Ashok and gets critically injured in an accident. In the hospital, Shanthi asks for Dheena's promise to protect Ashok's family from Aathi before she succumbs to her injuries.

Aathi, enraged by his sister's death, orders Dheena to kill the family of Ashok. But Dheena refuses and tells him that Shanthi was also in love with him. Aathi refuses to believe this and mistakenly believes that the reason for Dheena's refusal to obey him is his love for the boy's sister Chitra. Aathi swears that he will kill everyone responsible for this including Dheena and the brothers become sworn enemies. Dheena moves to Chitra's flat to protect her family, but Ashok is intimidated and does not believe his intentions. Aathi kills one of Ashok's friends and lands in jail. But Dheena continues to protect the family in various instances from Aathi's men, and they all understand Dheena's good intentions.

Aathi gets released and orders his men to kill Dheena and Chitra's family. The MLA Malarvannan finds out about the brothers' enmity and tries to join hands with Aathi to get his revenge on Dheena, but Aathi refuses to get him involved. Malarvannan, however, is determined to get his revenge on Dheena and sends his henchmen under the guise that they all belong to Aathi's group. Dheena finds out about this and fights them off, but Malarvannan's men stab Chitra. Meanwhile, Aathi learns about Shanthi's love for Ashok from some of her friends, realizes his mistake, and joins forces with Dheena once again and fights off Malarvannan and his men. Knowing that Malarvannan is responsible for this, Aathi tries to kill him, but Dheena stops him and tells him that if he kills him, someone will avenge him and this cycle of violence could continue and asks him to stop the violence. Chitra recovers from her injuries and finds that Aathi has accepted their family. Aathi finally declares Dheena to be his brother hereafter and they are all united.

== Cast ==
- Ajith Kumar as Dheenadhayalan (Dheena)
- Suresh Gopi as Aathikesavan (Aathi)
- Laila as Chitra (Voice dubbed by Savitha Reddy)
- Bala Singh as MLA Malarvannan
- Vaishnavi as Vaishnavi, Chitra's friend
- Sheela as Priya
- Rajesh as Police Officer
- Sriman as Anand, Auto driver
- Mahanadi Shankar as Narayanan
- Shyam Ganesh as Ashok, Chitra's brother
- K. R. Vatsala as Malarvannan's wife
- Neelu as Restaurant Owner
- Crane Manohar as Bus Conductor
- Besant Ravi
- Vijayalakshmi as Chitra and Ashok's mother
- Thadi Balaji as Balaji "Bala", Auto Driver
- Raviraj as Advocate
- Sampath Ram as Aadikesavan's henchman
- Divya as Shanthi
- Pondy Ravi as MLA Malarvannan's Henchman (credited as Ravi)
- Raneesh as Molester in Plaza Corner
- Nagma in an item number in the song "Vathikuchi Pathikadhu da"
- Alphonse Puthren as Molester in Plaza Corner (uncredited)

== Production ==
The film is the directorial debut of A. R. Murugadoss, who previously worked as an assistant to S. J. Suryah. The team considered signing Vasundhara Das as the lead actress, before opting for Laila. Nagma was selected to appear in an item number. In 2020, Laila revealed how she felt was not feeling well during the shooting of "Kadhal Website", but the upbeat tune of the song encouraged her to dance and the song became a hit upon release. A fight sequence was shot near Basin Bridge, Chennai.

== Soundtrack ==
The soundtrack was composed by Yuvan Shankar Raja. Music was released on Tips Music. The song "Nee Illai Endral" marked the singing debut of Anuradha Sriram's younger brother Murugan.

Track listing
No.	Title	Lyrics	Singer(s)	Length
1.	"Kathal Website Ondru"	Vaali	Shankar Mahadevan, Harini, Yuvan Shankar Raja	5:34
2.	"Nee Illai Endraal"	Vaali	Murugan M. Iyer, Bhavatharini, Yuvan Shankar Raja	5:24
3.	"Sollamal Thottu Chellum Thendral"	Vijay Sagar	Hariharan	5:24
4.	"Vathikuchi Pathikadhuda"	Vaali	S. P. Balasubrahmanyam	4:45
5.	"En Nenjil Mingle Aanaley"	Vijay Sagar	Harish Raghavendra	4:17
Total length:				25:29

== Release and reception ==
The film released on 14 January 2001, during Pongal. It received a positive review from The Hindu, with the critic stating that the "acts of the hero does appeal or impress the audience because his bloody adventures in the film are justifiable" labelling the film as a mass masala entertainer. Rediff.com suggested that "overall, the film is briskly paced, and holds your interest throughout. What prompts the 'Can do better' report are the little, but eminently avoidable, niggles." but praised the performances of Suresh Gopi and Ajith Kumar. Visual Dasan of Kalki gave the film a verdict of "average".

== Legacy ==
The film's success marked the beginning of a new image of Ajith Kumar, that of an action hero that would appeal to the masses. Furthermore, Ajith Kumar's nickname in the film, Thala (Leader) became a new identity for the actor amongst his fans. The film also established Murugadoss who went on to become one of the successful directors whereas Yuvan Shankar's songs were equally successful which are considered to have played a major role for the film's great success. The film was remade in Kannada as Dhumm (2002).
