= Ananth Babu =

Indian Telugu actor

- Born: Punyamurthula Anant; Injaram, Andhra Pradesh, India
- Occupations: Actor, comedian
- Relatives: Raja Babu (brother); Chitti Babu (brother)

Punyamurthula Anant, known by his stage name Ananth Babu (or simply Ananth), is an Indian actor and comedian, known for his works predominantly in Telugu cinema. He is the brother of noted comedians Raja Babu and Chitti Babu.

== Filmography ==
Ananth Babu acted in more than 380 films. Below is his selected filmography.

Year	Title	Role	Ref.
1989	Paila Pachessu		
1989	Rajakeeya Chadarangam		
1990	Nari Nari Naduma Murari		
1990	Rao Gari Intlo Rowdy		
1990	Nagastram		
1990	Balachandrudu		
1990	Puttinti Pattu Cheera		
1990	Alludugaru		
1991	Rowdy Alludu		
1991	Kulamma Gunamma		
1991	Rowdy Gari Pellam		
1991	Assembly Rowdy		
1991	Pelli Pustakam		
1992	Aapadbandhavudu		
1992	Teja		
1992	Babai Hotel	Thief	
1992	Prema Drohi		
1992	Valu Jada Tolu Beltu		
1992	Swati Kiranam	Ananth	
1993	Major Chandrakanth		
1993	Konguchaatu Krishnudu		
1993	Paruvu Prathishta		
1993	Asale Pellaina Vaani		
1993	Akka Pethanam Chelleli Kapuram		
1994	Hello Brother		
1994	Bangaru Kutumbam		
1994	Rickshaw Rudraiah		
1994	Allarodu		
1994	Neram		
1994	Maa Voori Maaraju		
1994	Parugo Parugu	Kittigadu / Pingala	
1995	Ghatothkachudu		
1995	Pokiri Raja		
1995	Real Hero		
1995	Desa Drohulu		
1995	Sisindri		
1996	Pelli Sandadi		
1996	Deyyam		
1996	Adirindi Alludu		
1996	Maa Aavida Collector		
1996	Dharma Chakram		
1997	Annamayya		
1997	Priyaragalu		
1997	Super Heroes		
1997	Pelli	Director	
1997	Priyamaina Srivaru		
1997	Priya O Priya		
1997	Master	Ananth	
1998	Suprabhatam		
1998	Choodalani Vundi		
1998	Auto Driver		
1998	Love Story 1999		
1998	Pandaga		
1998	Allari Prema		
1998	Daddy Daddy		
1999	Swayamvaram	Vasu	
1999	Swapnalokam		
1999	Rajakumarudu		
1999	Seenu		
2000	Chiru Navvutho		
2000	Nuvvu Vastavani	Newcomer to the City	
2000	Uncle		
2001	Family Circus		
2001	Ramma Chilakamma	Police Inspector	
2001	Raa		
2001	Daddy	Priya's assistant	
2001	Repallelo Radha		
2001	Naalo Unna Prema		
2001	Nuvvu Naaku Nachav		
2001	Student No: 1	Samba Sivam's assistant	
2001	Subbu		
2002	Kalusukovalani		
2002	Tappu Chesi Pappu Koodu		
2002	Vachina Vaadu Suryudu		
2002	Manmadhudu	Subba Rao	
2003	Dil	Professor	
2003	Dhanush		
2003	Villain		
2003	Maa Alludu Very Good		
2004	Tapana		
2004	Sri Anjaneyam	Lawyer Annayya	
2004	Shiva Shankar		
2004	Suryam		
2005	Naa Alludu		
2005	Athadu	Doctor	
2006	Sri Ramadasu		
2007	Chandamama	Priest	
2007	Allare Allari		
2008	Ullasamga Utsahamga		
2008	Deepavali	Cellphone salesman	
2009	Sasirekha Parinayam	Hotel Receptionist	
2009	Vengamamba		
2010	Jhummandi Naadam		
2010	Subhapradam		
2010	Khaleja	Ananth	
2010	Adhurs		
2011	Anaganaga O Dheerudu		
2012	Dhoni		
2012	Julai		
2012	Shirdi Sai		
2012	Sri Vasavi Vaibhavam		
2013	Attarintiki Daredi		
2013	Masala	Doctor	
2014	Hrudayam Ekkadunnadi		
2014	Alludu Seenu		
2014	Run Raja Run	Store worker	
2014	Subramanyam for Sale		
2015	Yevade Subramanyam	Nandi's neighbour	
2015	S/O Satyamurthy	Guest in Pallavi's wedding	
2015	Dongata	Hotel Manager	
2015	Columbus	Watchman	
2016	Eedu Gold Ehe		
2017	Vunnadhi Okate Zindagi	Doctor	
2017	Ami Thumi	Sarva Mangala Sastry "SMS"	
2018	Aravinda Sametha Veera Raghava	Car Broker	
2019	Gaddalakonda Ganesh	Priest	
2020	Ala Vaikunthapurramuloo	Priest	
2021	Deyyam		
2022	Sarkaru Vaari Paata	Colony member	
2022	Sita Ramam	Seetharamaiah	
2022	Anukoni Prayanam		
2022	Swathi Muthyam	Broker	
2023	Veera Simha Reddy	Priest	
2024	Dhoom Dhaam	Priest	
2024	Bhale Unnade	Dr. Genius	
2025	Oka Brundavanam	Vikram’s manager	
2025	Meghalu Cheppina Prema Katha	Priest	
2025	Premante	Sundaram Broker	
2026	Anaganaga Oka Raju	Priest	
2026	Vishnu Vinyasam	Vishnu’s alliance’s father	
2026	Papam Prathap		
2026	Sing Geetham	Lawyer	
