= List of highest-grossing Telugu films =

Telugu cinema is the segment of Indian cinema dedicated to the production of motion pictures in the Telugu language. It is one of the largest film production centres in India. This ranking lists the highest-grossing Telugu films produced by Telugu cinema, based on conservative global box office estimates as reported by organizations classified as green by Wikipedia. (Note: See WP:RSP, WP:ICTFSOURCES) The figures are not adjusted for inflation. However, there is no official tracking of figures, and sources publishing data are frequently pressured to increase their estimates.

== Key ==
Background shading indicates that a film, or at least one from a series, is currently showing in theatres worldwide.

== Highest-grossing films ==
The top grossing Telugu films worldwide are listed here.

Rank	Title	Worldwide gross	Year	Ref.
1	Baahubali 2: The Conclusion	₹1,810.6 crore	2017	(Note: ₹1,810.60 crore (Bollywood Hungama and Box Office India – ₹1,810 crore (DNA))
2	Pushpa 2: The Rule	₹1,642–1,800 crore	2024	(Note: Pushpa 2's reported worldwide grosses vary between ₹1,642 crore (The Hans India) – ₹1,800 crore (Deccan Chronicle; The Indian Express).)
3	RRR	₹1,300–1,387 crore	2022	(Note: RRR's reported worldwide grosses vary between ₹1,300 crore (News18 India, India Today, DNA) – ₹1,387 crore (NDTV India))
4	Kalki 2898 AD	₹1,042–1,100 crore	2024	(Note: Kalki 2898 AD's reported worldwide grosses vary between ₹1,042 (The Financial Express (India)) – ₹1,052.5 crore (ThePrint) – ₹1,100 crore (Deccan Chronicle, Business Standard, Deccan Herald, Hindustan Times and The Statesman))
5	Salaar: Part 1 – Ceasefire	₹614–702 crore	2023	(Note: According to Box Office India Salaar: Part 1 – Ceasefire grossed around ₹612 crore worldwide and Hindustan Times reported ₹617 crore while India Today reported that the film grossed around ₹700 crore worldwide during its 2023 run. In July 2024, the film released in Japan, earning JPY 23 million (USD 142,000; ₹1.19 crore) in its initial days, bringing the adjusted worldwide total to approximately ₹614–702 crore.)
6	Baahubali: The Beginning (Note: The film was produced in the Telugu language but was also reshot in Tamil, according to the filmmakers.)	₹599.72–650 crore	2015	(Note: Baahubali: The Beginning's reported worldwide grosses vary between ₹599.72 crore (Box Office India) – ₹600 crore (India Today and The Indian Express) – ₹650 crore (Firstpost))
7	Saaho (Note: The film was produced in both the Telugu and Hindi languages, according to the filmmakers.)	₹434–439 crore	2019	(Note: Saaho's reported worldwide grosses vary between ₹434 crore (Deccan Herald) – ₹439 crore (India Today))
8	Adipurush	₹392.7 crore	2023	(Note: Adipurush's reported worldwide gross is ₹392.70 crore according to Business Today, Deccan Chronicle, and News18.)
9	Devara: Part 1	₹380–521 crore	2024	(Note: Devara's reported worldwide grosses vary between ₹380 crore (Box Office India) – ₹420 crore (DNA India) – ₹509 crore (Business Standard) – ₹521 crore (Bollywood Hungama))
10	Pushpa: The Rise	₹360–393.50 crore	2021	(Note: News 18 Telugu mentioned it as ₹360 crores. While The Times of India reported the collection to be ₹365 crore. Later Pinkvilla reported the collection to be ₹393.50 crore.)
11	Peddi	₹330–336.85 crore	2026	(Note: Peddi's reported worldwide grosses vary between ₹330 crore (Deccan Herald, Cinema Express) – ₹336.85 crore (Outlook India))
12	Mana Shankara Vara Prasad Garu	₹300–310 crore	2026	(Note: Mana Shankara Vara Prasad Garu's reported worldwide grosses vary between ₹300 crore (Filmfare, The Week) – ₹310 crore (Deccan Chronicle))
13	Hanu-Man	₹298–350 crore	2024	(Note: HanuMan's reported worldwide grosses vary between ₹298 crore (Hindustan Times, Deccan Chronicle) – ₹350 crore (The Indian Express))
14	They Call Him OG	₹293.65–300 crore	2025	(Note: They Call Him OG grossed ₹293.65 crore (News18; The Telegraph) – ₹294 crore (Daily News and Analysis) – ₹300 crore (The Economic Times))
15	Sankranthiki Vasthunam	₹275–300 crore	2025	(Note: The Financial Express reported ₹275 crore. NDTV, News18, The Hans India, The Hindu and The Economic Times have reported the ₹300 crore gross.)
16	Ala Vaikunthapurramuloo	₹262–280 crore	2020	(Note: Ala Vaikunthapurramuloo's reported worldwide grosses vary between ₹262 crore (Deccan Herald and The News Minute) – ₹280 crore (Cinema Express))
17	Irumudi	₹251.25 crore	2026	
18	Sye Raa Narasimha Reddy	₹240 crore	2019	
19	Waltair Veerayya	₹236.15 crore	2023	
20	Sarileru Neekevvaru	₹260 crore	2020	
21	Rangasthalam	₹216 crore	2018	
22	The RajaSaab	₹208 crore	2026	
23	Game Changer	₹195 crore	2025	
24	Aravinda Sametha Veera Raghava	₹190 crore	2018	
25	Attarintiki Daredi	₹187 crore	2013	
26	Guntur Kaaram	₹184 crore	2024	
27	Sarkaru Vaari Paata	₹180–230 crore	2022	
28	Maharshi	₹175–200 crore	2019	
29	Khaidi No. 150	₹164 crore	2017	
30	Bheemla Nayak	₹160 crore	2022	
31	Magadheera	₹150.5 crore	2009	
32	Jai Lava Kusa	₹150–175 crore	2017	
33	Gabbar Singh	₹150 crore	2012	
33	Janatha Garage	₹150 crore	2016	
33	DJ: Duvvada Jagannadham	₹150 crore	2017	
33	Akhanda	₹150 crore	2021	
37	Bharat Ane Nenu	₹149–225 crore	2018	
38	Srimanthudu	₹144–200 crore	2015	
39	Mirai	₹141–150 crore	2025	
40	Radhe Shyam	₹140–214 crore	2022	(Note: Hindustan Times reported gross was ₹140 crore. News18 said that the collection was ₹200 crore. The Times of India and India Today said that the collection was ₹214.04 crore.)
41	Bhagavanth Kesari	₹138 crore	2023	
42	Vakeel Saab	₹137.5 crore	2021	
43	Tillu Square	₹135 crore	2024	
44	Veera Simha Reddy	₹134 crore	2023	
45	Geetha Govindam	₹132 crore	2018	
46	Daaku Maharaaj	₹130 crore	2025	(Note: The Hans India has reported ₹130 crore gross.)
47	Akhanda 2: Thaandavam	₹128 crore	2025	
48	Sarrainodu	₹127.6 crore	2016	
49	F2: Fun and Frustration	₹127.2–140 crore	2019	
50	Race Gurram	₹125–150 crore	2014	

== Highest-grossing films by opening day ==
Rank	Title	Worldwide gross	Year	Ref.
1	Pushpa 2: The Rule	₹258–280 crore	2024	
2	RRR	₹223 crore	2022	
3	Baahubali 2: The Conclusion	₹217 crore	2017	
4	Kalki 2898 AD	₹161.50–180 crore	2024	(Note: Kalki 2898 AD's reported opening day grosses vary between ₹161.50 crore (Pinkvilla) – ₹180 crore (Bollywood Hungama))
5	They Call Him OG	₹154–155 crore	2025	
6	Salaar: Part 1 – Ceasefire	₹145–175 crore	2023	
7	Devara: Part 1	₹132–146 crore	2024	
8	Saaho	₹116–130 crore	2019	(Note: Saaho's reported opening day grosses vary between ₹116 crore (Pinkvilla) – ₹130 crore (The Indian Express))
9	Peddi	₹112−135 crore	2026	
10	The RajaSaab	₹100.90 crore	2026	

== Highest-grossing films by month ==
Month	Title	Worldwide gross	Year	Ref.
January	Mana Shankara Vara Prasad Garu	₹300–310 crore	2026	
February	Bheemla Nayak	₹193 crore	2022	
March	RRR	₹1,253–1,387 crore	2022	
April	Baahubali 2: The Conclusion	₹1,810 crore	2017	
May	Sarkaru Vaari Paata	₹230 crore	2022	
June	Kalki 2898 AD	₹1,042–1,100 crore	2024	
July	Baahubali: The Beginning	₹599.72–650 crore	2015	
August	Saaho	₹434–439 crore	2019	
September	Devara: Part 1	₹380–521 crore	2024	
October	Sye Raa Narasimha Reddy	₹240 crore	2019	
November	Yashoda	₹32–50 crore	2022	
December	Pushpa 2: The Rule	₹1,642–1,800 crore	2024	

== Highest-grossing films by market ==
=== India ===
Rank	Title	Total gross	Year	Ref.
1	Baahubali 2: The Conclusion	₹1,429.83 crore	2017	
2	Pushpa 2: The Rule	₹1,381 crore	2024	
3	RRR	₹944 crore	2022	
4	Kalki 2898 AD	₹776 crore	2024	
5	Baahubali: The Beginning	₹515.77 crore	2015	
6	Salaar: Part 1 – Ceasefire	₹475.1 crore	2023	
7	Devara: Part 1	₹347 crore	2024	
8	Pushpa: The Rise	₹346.30 crore	2021	
9	Saaho	₹339.25 crore	2019	
10	Adipurush	₹305 crore	2024	

==== Andhra Pradesh and Telangana ====
Rank	Title	Total gross	Year	Ref.
1	RRR	₹415 crore	2022	
2	Pushpa 2: The Rule	₹342 crore	2024	
3	Baahubali 2: The Conclusion	₹327 crore	2017	
4	Kalki 2898 AD	₹291 crore	2024	
5	Devara: Part 1	₹237 crore	2024	
6	Salaar: Part 1 – Ceasefire	₹235 crore	2023	
7	Mana Shankara Vara Prasad Garu	₹225 crore	2026	
8	Irumudi	₹222 crore	2026	
9	Sankranthiki Vasthunam	₹206.25 crore	2025	
10	Ala Vaikunthapurramuloo	₹196 crore	2020	

==== Karnataka ====
Rank	Title	Total gross	Year	Ref.
1	Baahubali 2: The Conclusion	₹127.50 crore	2017	
2	Pushpa 2: The Rule	₹92 crore	2024	
3	Kalki 2898 AD	₹77 crore	2024	
4	RRR	₹75.50 crore	2022	
5	Baahubali: The Beginning	₹69 crore	2015	
6	Salaar: Part 1 – Ceasefire	₹45.75 crore	2023	
7	Devara: Part 1	₹40 crore	2024	
8	Sye Raa Narasimha Reddy	₹29.80 crore	2019	
9	Saaho	₹29.35 crore	2019	
10	Mana Shankara Vara Prasad Garu	₹22.50 crore	2026	

==== Tamil Nadu ====
Rank	Title	Total gross	Year	Ref.
1	Baahubali 2: The Conclusion	₹152 crore	2017	
2	RRR	₹80.75 crore	2022	
3	Pushpa 2: The Rule	₹76 crore	2024	
4	Baahubali: The Beginning	₹62.66 crore	2015	
5	Kalki 2898 AD	₹43 crore	2024	
6	Sir	₹42.25 crore	2023	
7	Pushpa: The Rise	₹31 crore	2021	
8	Oopiri	₹27.10 crore	2016	
9	Eega	₹24.66 crore	2012	
10	Salaar: Part 1 – Ceasefire	₹24 crore	2023	

==== Kerala ====
Rank	Title	Total gross	Year	Ref.
1	Baahubali 2: The Conclusion	₹75 crore	2017	
2	Kalki 2898 AD	₹30.50 crore	2024	
3	RRR	₹25.50 crore	2022	
4	Lucky Baskhar	₹21.50 crore	2024	
5	Pushpa 2: The Rule	₹18 crore	2024	
6	Salaar: Part 1 – Ceasefire	₹17.25 crore	2023	
7	Pushpa: The Rise	₹14.50 crore	2021	
8	Baahubali: The Beginning	₹14.20 crore	2015	
9	Sita Ramam	₹8 crore	2022	
10	Sarrainodu	₹7.2 crore	2016	

=== North America ===
Rank	Title	Gross (US$)	Year	Ref.
1	Baahubali 2: The Conclusion	$22 million	2017	
2	Kalki 2898 AD	$18.573 million	2024	
3	Pushpa 2: The Rule	$15.280 million	2024	
4	RRR	$15.156 million	2022	
5	Salaar: Part 1 – Ceasefire	$8.942 million	2023	
6	Baahubali: The Beginning	$8.46 million	2015	
7	Devara: Part 1	$6.077 million	2024	
8	They Call Him OG	$5.525 million	2025	
9	Hanu-Man	$5.314 million	2024	
10	Ala Vaikunthapurramuloo	$3.651 million	2020	

=== Australia ===
Rank	Title	Gross (A$)	Year	Ref.
1	Baahubali 2: The Conclusion	A$4,501,217	2017	
2	Pushpa 2: The Rule	A$4,483,063	2024	
3	RRR	A$3,598,591	2022	
4	Kalki 2898 AD	A$3,130,256	2024	
5	Salaar: Part 1 – Ceasefire	A$1,750,449	2023	
6	Saaho	A$1,030,753	2019	
7	Baahubali: The Beginning	A$995,000	2015	
8	Devara: Part 1	A$951,355	2024	
9	Adipurush	A$901,134	2024	
10	Pushpa: The Rise	A$629,475	2021	

== Highest-grossing films by year ==
Year	Title	Worldwide gross	Ref.
1974	Alluri Seetarama Raju		
1975	Soggadu		
1976	Aradhana		
1977	Adavi Ramudu		
1978	Pottelu Punnamma		
1979	Vetagadu		
1980	Sardar Paparayudu		
1981	Kondaveeti Simham		
1982	Bobbili Puli		
1983	Khaidi		
1984	Bobbili Brahmanna		
1985	Pratighatana		
1986	Simhasanam		
1987	Pasivadi Pranam		
1988	Yamudiki Mogudu		
1989	Siva		
1990	Jagadeka Veerudu Athiloka Sundari	₹15 crore	
1991	Gang Leader	₹10 crore	
1992	Gharana Mogudu	₹10 crore share	
1993	Major Chandrakanth		
1994	Hello Brother		
1995	Pedarayudu		
1996	Ninne Pelladata		
1997	Osey Ramulamma		
1998	Choodalani Vundi		
1999	Samarasimha Reddy	₹30 crore	
2000	Nuvve Kavali		
2001	Kushi		
2002	Indra		
2003	Simhadri	₹32.7 crore	
2004	Shankar Dada M.B.B.S.		
2005	Andarivaadu		
2006	Pokiri	₹70–76 crore	
2007	Yamadonga	₹50 crore	
2008	Jalsa	₹47 crore	
2009	Magadheera	₹150.5 crore	
2010	Simha	₹60 crore	
2011	Dookudu	₹102 crore	
2012	Gabbar Singh	₹150 crore	
2013	Attarintiki Daredi	₹187 crore	
2014	Race Gurram	₹125–150 crore	
2015	Baahubali: The Beginning	₹599.72–650 crore	
2016	Janatha Garage	₹150 crore	
2017	Baahubali 2: The Conclusion	₹1,810.60 crore	
2018	Bharat Ane Nenu	₹225 crore	
2019	Saaho	₹434–439 crore	
2020	Ala Vaikunthapurramuloo	₹262–280 crore	
2021	Pushpa: The Rise	₹360–393.50 crore	
2022	RRR	₹1,300–1,387 crore	
2023	Salaar: Part 1 – Ceasefire	₹614–702 crore	
2024	Pushpa 2: The Rule	₹1,642–1,800 crore	
2025	They Call Him OG	₹293.65–300 crore	
2026	Peddi	₹330–336.85 crore	

== Milestones ==
The following are list the flims that have reached the below milestones first in the Telugu fllm industry

Milestone	Title	Year	Director	Production Company(s)	Annual Gross	Ref.
₹1 crore	Mayabazar	1957	K. V. Reddy	Vijaya Productions		
₹10 crore	Jagadeka Veerudu Athiloka Sundari	1990	K. Raghavendra Rao	Vyjayanthi Movies	₹15 crore	
₹25 crore	Samarasimha Reddy	1999	B. Gopal	Satyanarayanamma Productions	₹30 crore	
₹50 crore	Pokiri	2006	Puri Jagannadh	Indira Productions, Vaishno Academy	₹70 crore	
₹75 crore	Arundhati	2009	Kodi Ramakrishna	Mallemala Entertainments	₹75 crore	
₹100 crore	Magadheera	2009	S. S. Rajamouli	Geetha Arts, Sri Venkateswara Cine Chitra	₹134 crore	
₹125 crore	Magadheera	2009	S. S. Rajamouli	Geetha Arts, Sri Venkateswara Cine Chitra	₹134 crore	
₹150 crore	Baahubali: The Beginning	2015	S. S. Rajamouli	Arka Media Works	₹600–650 crore	
₹175 crore	Baahubali: The Beginning	2015	S. S. Rajamouli	Arka Media Works	₹600–650 crore	
₹200 crore	Baahubali: The Beginning	2015	S. S. Rajamouli	Arka Media Works	₹600–650 crore	
₹300 crore	Baahubali: The Beginning	2015	S. S. Rajamouli	Arka Media Works	₹600–650 crore	
₹400 crore	Baahubali: The Beginning	2015	S. S. Rajamouli	Arka Media Works	₹600–650 crore	
₹500 crore	Baahubali: The Beginning	2015	S. S. Rajamouli	Arka Media Works	₹600–650 crore	
₹600 crore	Baahubali: The Beginning	2015	S. S. Rajamouli	Arka Media Works	₹600–650 crore	
₹700 crore	Baahubali 2: The Conclusion	2017	S. S. Rajamouli	Arka Media Works	₹1,810.60 crore	
₹800 crore	Baahubali 2: The Conclusion	2017	S. S. Rajamouli	Arka Media Works	₹1,810.60 crore	
₹900 crore	Baahubali 2: The Conclusion	2017	S. S. Rajamouli	Arka Media Works	₹1,810.60 crore	
₹1,000 crore	Baahubali 2: The Conclusion	2017	S. S. Rajamouli	Arka Media Works	₹1,810.60 crore	
₹1,100 crore	Baahubali 2: The Conclusion	2017	S. S. Rajamouli	Arka Media Works	₹1,810.60 crore	
₹1,200 crore	Baahubali 2: The Conclusion	2017	S. S. Rajamouli	Arka Media Works	₹1,810.60 crore	
₹1,300 crore	Baahubali 2: The Conclusion	2017	S. S. Rajamouli	Arka Media Works	₹1,810.60 crore	
₹1,400 crore	Baahubali 2: The Conclusion	2017	S. S. Rajamouli	Arka Media Works	₹1,810.60 crore	
₹1,500 crore	Baahubali 2: The Conclusion	2017	S. S. Rajamouli	Arka Media Works	₹1,810.60 crore	
₹1,600 crore	Baahubali 2: The Conclusion	2017	S. S. Rajamouli	Arka Media Works	₹1,810.60 crore	
₹1,700 crore	Baahubali 2: The Conclusion	2017	S. S. Rajamouli	Arka Media Works	₹1,810.60 crore	
₹1,800 crore	Baahubali 2: The Conclusion	2017	S. S. Rajamouli	Arka Media Works	₹1,810.60 crore	

== Highest-grossing franchises ==
Highest-grossing franchises

Rank	Franchise	Worldwide gross (crore) (Note: The franchise gross is calculated using the lowest reported gross for each film in the franchise.)	No. of films	Average gross (crore)	Highest grosser

1	Baahubali	₹2,512.3	3	₹837	Baahubali 2: The Conclusion (₹1,810.60 crore)
1	The Conclusion (2017)	₹1,810.60			
2	The Beginning (2015)	₹650			
3	The Epic (2025)	₹51.70			

2	Pushpa	₹2,002	2	₹1,001	Pushpa 2: The Rule (₹1,642–1,800 crore)
1	Pushpa 2: The Rule (2024)	₹1,642			
2	Pushpa: The Rise (2021)	₹360			

3	Sujeeth Cinematic Universe	₹727	2	₹364	Saaho (₹434−439 crore)
1	Saaho (2019)	₹434			
2	They Call Him OG (2025)	₹293			

4	Fun and Frustration	₹275	2	₹138	F2: Fun and Frustration (₹140 crore)
1	F2: Fun and Frustration (2019)	₹140			
2	F3: Fun and Frustration (2022)	₹135			

5	Akhanda	₹247.6	2	₹124	Akhanda (₹133.2 crore)
1	Akhanda (2021)	₹133.2			
2	Akhanda 2: Thaandavam (2025)	₹114.4			

6	Gabbar Singh	₹240	2	₹120	Gabbar Singh (₹150 crore)
1	Gabbar Singh (2012)	₹150			
2	Sardaar Gabbar Singh (2016)	₹90			

7	Khaidi	₹175	3	₹58	Khaidi No. 150 (₹164 crore)
1	Khaidi No. 150 (2017)	₹164			
2	Khaidi No. 786 (1988)	₹7			
3	Khaidi (1983)	₹4			

8	HIT Universe	₹173.5	3	₹58	HIT: The Third Case (₹120 crore)
1	The Third Case (2025)	₹120			
2	The Second Case (2022)	₹42.50			
3	The First Case (2020)	₹11			

9	Tillu	₹165.3	2	₹83	Tillu Square (₹135 crore)
1	DJ Tillu (2022)	₹30.30			
2	Tillu Square (2024)	₹135			

10	Bangarraju	₹148.5	2	₹74	Soggade Chinni Nayana (₹82.5 crore)
1	Soggade Chinni Nayana (2016)	₹82.5			
2	Bangarraju (2022)	₹66			

11	Karthikeya	₹141.5	2	₹71	Karthikeya 2 (₹121.50 crore)
1	Karthikeya (2014)	₹20			
2	Karthikeya 2 (2022)	₹121.50			

12	Mad	₹90	2	₹45	Mad Square (₹66 crore)
1	Mad (2023)	₹24			
2	Mad Square (2025)	₹66			

13	Kick	₹73.5	2	₹37	Kick 2 (₹43.5 crore)
1	Kick (2009)	₹30			
2	Kick 2 (2015)	₹43.5			

14	Shankar Dada	₹70.36	2	₹35	Shankar Dada M.B.B.S. (₹45.36 crore)
1	Shankar Dada M.B.B.S. (2004)	₹45.36			
2	Shankar Dada Zindabad (2007)	₹25			

15	Rakta Charitra	₹69	2	₹35	Rakta Charitra I (₹48 crore)
1	Rakta Charitra I (2010)	₹48			
2	Rakta Charitra II (2010)	₹21			

16	Raju Gari Gadhi	₹65.79	3	₹22	Raju Gari Gadhi 2 (₹35.65 crore)
1	Raju Gari Gadhi (2015)	₹18			
2	Raju Gari Gadhi 2 (2017)	₹35.65			
3	Raju Gari Gadhi 3 (2019)	₹12.14			

17	Arya	₹62	2	₹31	Arya 2 (₹32 crore)
1	Arya (2004)	₹30			
2	Arya 2 (2009)	₹32			

18	Manmadhudu	₹47	2	₹24	Manmadhudu 2 (₹29 crore)
1	Manmadhudu (2002)	₹18			
2	Manmadhudu 2 (2019)	₹29			

19	NTR	₹38.62	2	₹19	N.T.R: Kathanayakudu (₹20.62 crore)
1	NTR: Kathanayakudu (2019)	₹20.62			
2	NTR: Mahanayakudu (2019)	₹18			

== See also ==
- List of highest-grossing Indian films
  - List of highest-grossing Hindi films
  - List of highest-grossing Indian Bengali films
  - List of highest-grossing Marathi films
  - List of highest-grossing Punjabi-language films
  - List of highest-grossing Kannada films
  - List of highest-grossing Malayalam films
  - List of highest-grossing Tamil films
- List of highest-grossing films in India
- List of highest-grossing South Indian films
