= List of Telugu films of 1996 =

This is a list of films produced by the Tollywood (Telugu language film industry) based in Hyderabad in the year 1996.

== List of released films ==
Title	Director	Cast	Music director	Sources
Adirindi Alludu	E. V. V. Satyanarayana	Mohan Babu, Gautami, Ramya Krishna	M. M. Keeravani	
Akka! Bagunnava?	Mouli	Vikram, Anand, Jayasudha, Ravali, Subhashri	Koti	
Akkada Ammayi Ikkada Abbayi	E. V. V. Satyanarayana	Pawan Kalyan, Supriya, Sarath Babu	Koti	
Akkum Bakkum	K. Ram Gopal	Ali, Brahmanandam, Babu Mohan, Annapoorna	Vidyasagar	
Amma Ammani Choodalanivundi	Sagar	Vinod Kumar, Ramya Krishna, Brahmanandam	Vandemataram Srinivas	
Amma Durgamma	Vandemataram Srinivas	Shashikumar, Ooha	Somayajula Murthy	
Bombay Priyudu	K. Raghavendra Rao	J. D. Chakravarthy, Rambha, Vanisri	M. M. Keeravani	
Chinnabbayi	K. Vishwanath	Daggubati Venkatesh, Ramya Krishnan, Ravali	Illyaraja	
Deyyam	Ram Gopal Varma	J. D. Chakravarthy, Maheshwari, Jayasudha	Vishwanatha Satyanarayana	
Dharma Chakram	Suresh Krishna	Daggubati Venkatesh, Ramya Krishna, Prema, Brahmanandam	M. M. Sreelekha	
Drohi	P. C. Sreeram	Kamal Haasan, Arjun Sarja, Gautami, Geetha, Nassar, K. Vishwanath	Deva	
Family	Vijaya Bapineedu	Rajendra Prasad, Sivaranjani		
Gulabi	Krishna Vamshi	J. D. Chakravarthy, Maheshwari, Brahmanandam	Shashi Pritam	
Gunshot	S. V. Krishna Reddy	Ali, Prakash Raj, Keerthi Reddy		
Intlo Illalu Vantintlo Priyuralu	E. V. V. Satyanarayana	Daggubati Venkatesh, Soundarya, Vineetha	Koti	
Jabilamma Pelli	A. Kodandarami Reddy	Jagapathi Babu, Maheswari, Vanisri	M. M. Keeravani	
Ladies Doctor	Ramu	Rajendra Prasad, Vineetha		
Little Soldiers	Gangaraju Gunnam	Baladitya, Kota Srinivasa Rao, Brahmanandam	Sri	
Maa Aavida Collector	Kodi Ramakrishna	Jagapathi Babu, Prema	Vandemataram Srinivas	
Mummy Mee Aayanochadu		Rajendra Prasad, Indraja, Brahmanandam		
Maavichiguru	S. V. Krishna Reddy	Jagapathi Babu, Aamani, Ranjitha	S. V. Krishna Reddy	
Merupu	Gopichand Nadella	Vikram, Anand, Kasthuri	Ramani Bharadwaja	
Mrugam	Rudrajj Suresh Varma	J. D. Chakravarthy, Maheswari, Ranganath	Raj	
Ninne Pelladata	Krishna Vamsi	Nagarjuna Akkineni, Tabu, Lakshmi	Sandeep Chowta	
Ooha	Sivala Prabhakar	Vikram, Sivaranjani, Ali	Vidya Sagar	
Pavitra Bandham	Muthyala Subbaiah	Daggubati Venkatesh, Soundarya, S. P. Balasubrahmanyam	M. M. Keeravani	
Pittala Dora	Sana Yadireddy	Ali, Indraja, Kota Srinivasa Rao, Thanikella Bharani	Ramani Bharadwaja	
Ramudochadu	A. Kodandarami Reddy	Nagarjuna, Krishna, Soundarya, Ravali	Raj	
Rayudugaru Nayudugaru	Dasari Narayana Rao	ANR, Vinod Kumar, Roja	M. M. Keeravani	
Sahasa Veerudu Sagara Kanya	K. Raghavendra Rao	Daggubati Venkatesh, Shilpa Shetty, Malashri	M. M. Keeravani	
Sarada Bullodu	Raviraja Pinisetty	Daggubati Venkatesh, Nagma, Sanghavi	Koti	
Sri Krishnarjuna Vijayam	Singeetam Srinivasa Rao	Balakrishna, Roja Selvamani, Priya Raman	Madavapeddi Suresh	
Srikaram	C. Uma Maheswara Rao	Jagapati Babu, Heera Rajagopal, Meghana		
Vamsanikokkadu	Sarath	Balakrishna, Ramya Krishna	Koti	
Vinodam	S. V. Krishna Reddy	Meka Srikanth, Ravali, Kota Srinivasa Rao		

== See also ==
- List of Telugu films of 1995
- Lists of Telugu-language films
- List of Telugu films of 1997
