= List of Telugu films of 2000 =

This is a list of Telugu films released in 2000.

== Box office collection ==
The highest-grossing Tollywood films released in 2000, by worldwide box office gross revenue, are as follows:

Highest worldwide gross of 2000
| Rank | Title | Production company | Worldwide gross | Ref |
|---|---|---|---|---|
| 1 | Nuvve Kavali | Ushakiran Movies | ₹35.6 crore(gross) ₹19.5 crore distributors' share | |
| 2 | Kalisundam Raa | Suresh Productions | ₹19 crore distributors' share | |
| 3 | Annayya | Shri Sai Ram Films | ₹16 crore distributors' share | |
| 4 | Badri | Vijaya Lakshmi Films | ₹16 crore distributors' share | |
| 5 | Jayam Manadera | Suresh Productions | ₹14 crore distributors' share | |
| 6 | Nuvvu Vastavani | Super Good Films | ₹13 crore distributors' share | |
| 7 | Kshemamga Velli Labhamga Randi | ML Art Movies | ₹12 crore distributors' share | |
| 8 | Chitram | Ushakiran Movies | ₹12 crore distributors' share | |
| 9 | Devullu | Babu Pictures | ₹12 crore distributors' share | |
| 10 | Chala Bagundi | E. V. V Cinema | ₹10 crore distributors' share | |

== January–June ==
| Opening | | Title | Director | Cast | Production house | Ref |
|---|---|---|---|---|---|---|
| J A N | 1 | Kodanda Ramudu | | J. D. Chakravarthi, Saptaparna Saha, Rambha, Laya | | |
| J A N | 7 | Annayya | | Chiranjeevi, Ravi Teja, Soundarya, Simran, Sharath Babu | | |
| J A N | 13 | Postman | | Mohan Babu, Soundarya, Raasi | | |
| J A N | 14 | Vamsoddharakudu | | Balakrishna Nandamuri, Sakshi Shivanand, Ramya Krishna, Krishnam Raju | | |
| J A N | 14 | Kalisundam Raa | | Venkatesh, Simran | | |
| J A N | 15 | Sammakka Sarakka | | Suman, Ramya Krishna, Roja, Jaya Pradha, Indraja, Brahmaji | | |
| F E B | 4 | Kshemamga Velli Labhamga Randi | | Srikanth, Rajendra Prasad, Roja, Brahmanandam, Ramya Krishna, Kovai Sarala, Prakash Raj | | |
| F E B | 10 | Ganapathi | | Srihari, Ashwani, Rami Reddy | | |
| F E B | 10 | Hands Up | | Nagendra Babu, Jayasudha, Brahmanandam | | |
| F E B | 18 | Chala Bagundi | | Srikanth, Malavika, Vadde Naveen, Asha Saini | | |
| F E B | 25 | Nisabda Ratri | | Kaushal, Raksha | | |
| F E B | 26 | Manasu Paddanu Kaani | | Venu Thottempudi, K. Vishwanath, Raasi, Ramya Krishna | | |
| M A R | 3 | Ravanna | | Rajasekhar, Sanghavi, Soundarya, Krishna Ghattamaneni | | |
| M A R | 10 | Sanchalanam | | Prakash Raj, Babloo Prithviraj, Roja | | |
| M A R | 16 | Raghavayya Gari Abbayi | | Sri Harsha, Prema | | |
| M A R | 31 | Balaram | | Srihari, Raasi, Vineeth, Maheswari | | |
| A P R | 5 | Nuvvu Vastavani | | Nagarjuna, Simran, Isha Koppikar | | |
| A P R | 14 | Yuvaraju | | Mahesh Babu, Simran, Sakshi Shivanand | | |
| A P R | 20 | Badri | | Pawan Kalyan, Ameesha Patel, Renu Desai, Prakash Raj | | |
| A P R | 28 | Madhuri | | Abbas, Anjana | | |
| M A Y | 5 | Pasupu Kumkuma | | Sijju, Jackie, Anjani Thakkar | | |
| M A Y | 13 | Manoharam | | Jagapathi Babu, Laya, Prakash Raj | | |
| M A Y | 18 | Yuvakudu | | Sumanth, Bhoomika Chawla, Jaya Sudha | | |
| M A Y | 26 | Oke Maata | | Upendra, Ramya Krishna, Raasi | | |
| M A Y | 26 | Nagulamma | | Babloo Prithviraj, Maheswari | | |
| J U N | 1 | Bagunnara | | Vadde Naveen, Priya Gill, Srihari, Vijayakumar | | |
| J U N | 8 | Sivanna | | Sai Kumar, Manya | | |
| J U N | 9 | Hindustan | | Naresh, Bhanupriya | | |
| J U N | 9 | Real Story | | Prakash Raj, Sandhya, Brahmanandam | | |
| J U N | 16 | Chitram | | Uday Kiran, Reema Sen | | |
| J U N | 22 | Sivaji (Telugu) | | Srihari, Raasi | | |
| J U N | 23 | Okkadu Chalu | | Rajasekhar, Suresh, Rambha, Sanghavi | | |
| J U N | 30 | Adavi Chukka | | Vijayashanti, Charanraj, Suman | | |

== July–December ==
| Opening | | Title | Director | Cast | Production house | Ref |
|---|---|---|---|---|---|---|
| J U L | 7 | Bachelors | Sana Yadi Reddy | Sivaji, Manya | | |
| J U L | 14 | Maa Pelliki Randi | Muppalaneni Shiva | J. D. Chakravarthy, Sakshi Shivanand | | |
| J U L | 14 | Pellam Vachindi | Krishna Reddy | Suman, Manichandana, Radhika Chowdhary | | |
| J U L | 21 | Goppinti Alludu | E. V. V. Satyanarayana | Nandamuri Balakrishna, Simran, Sanghavi | | |
| J U L | 27 | Pelli Sambandham | K. Raghavendra Rao | Akkineni Nageswara Rao, Sumanth, Sakshi Shivanand, Sanghavi | | |
| J U L | 27 | Kauravudu | V. Jyotikumar | Konidela Nagendra Babu, Ramya Krishna | | |
| A U G | 4 | Sardukupodam Randi | S. V. Krishna Reddy | Jagapathi Babu, Soundarya, Asha Saini, M. S. Narayana, Jayasudha | | |
| A U G | 11 | Manasunna Maaraju | Muthyala Subbaiah | Rajasekhar, Laya, Asha Saini | | |
| A U G | 11 | 9 Nelalu | Kranthi Kumar | Vikram, Soundarya | | |
| A U G | 11 | Ee Tharam Nehru | Siva Nagu | Krishna Ghattamaneni, Suman, Suresh, Prema | | |
| A U G | 18 | Choosoddaam Randi | Raja Vannem Reddy | Jagapathi Babu, Srikanth, Rambha | | |
| A U G | 18 | Manasichanu | Pramod Kumar | Ravi Teja, Manichandana | | |
| A U G | 25 | Vyjayanthi | K S Nageswara Rao | Vijayashanti, Babloo Prithviraj | | |
| A U G | 25 | February 14th Necklace Road | Seenu | Suman, Bhanupriya | | |
| S E P | 1 | Moodu Mukkalaata | K. Raghavendra Rao | Jagapathi Babu, Soundarya, Rambha, Raasi | | |
| S E P | 1 | Bhavani | Subba Rao | Suresh, Babloo Prithviraj, Manya | | |
| S E P | 14 | Ninne Premistha | R. R. Shinde | Nagarjuna, Srikanth, Soundarya | | |
| S E P | 15 | Rayalaseema Ramanna Chowdary | Ravi Raja Pinisetty | Mohan Babu, Jaya Sudha, Priya Gill | | |
| S E P | 15 | Ayodhya Ramayya | Chandra Mahesh | Srihari, Bhanupriya | | |
| S E P | 22 | Tensionlo Tension | D Ranga Rao | Ajay, Manichandana | | |
| S E P | 29 | Azad | Tirupathy Swami | Nagarjuna, Raghuvaran, Soundarya, Shilpa Shetty, Prakash Raj | | |
| O C T | 4 | Vamsi | B. Gopal | Mahesh Babu, Namrata Shirodkar, Krishna Ghattamaneni | | |
| O C T | 7 | Jayam Manadera | N. Shankar | Venkatesh, Soundarya | | |
| O C T | 13 | Nuvve Kavali | Vijayabhaskar | Tarun Kumar, Richa Pallod, Saikiran | | |
| O C T | 20 | Ammo! Okato Tareekhu | E. V. V. Satyanarayana | Srikanth, Suresh, Raasi | | |
| O C T | 27 | NTR Nagar | Babji | Dupes, Manichandana | | |
| N O V | 3 | Sri Sai Mahima | Ashok Kumar | Om Prakash Rao, Jayasudha | | |
| N O V | 3 | Sri Srimati Satyabhama | S. V. Krishna Reddy | Rahman, Vijayashanti | | |
| N O V | 9 | Bachi | Puri Jagannadh | Jagapathi Babu, Neelambari, Kota Srinivasa Rao, Prakash Raj | | |
| N O V | 9 | Devullu | Kodi Ramakrishna | Ramya Krishna, Raasi, Srikanth, Laya, Rajendra Prasad | | |
| N O V | 9 | College | Ravi Chavali | Sivaji, Manya | | |
| N O V | 16 | Chiru Navvutho | Vijaybhaskar | Venu Thottempudi, Shaheen Khan, Sunil | | |
| N O V | 16 | Anta Mana Manchike | K. Veeru | Rajendra Prasad, Rachana Banerjee, Asha Saini | | |
| N O V | 23 | Vijayaramaraju | Veera Shankar | Srihari, Urvashi | | |
| D E C | 1 | Maa Annayya | Raviraja Pinisetty | Rajasekhar, Meena, Deepti Bhatnagar | | |
| D E C | 1 | Subhavela | Ramana | Ravikanth, Anasuya | | |
| D E C | 8 | Durga | R. K. Selvamani | Roja, Venu Thottempudi | | |
| D E C | 8 | Uncle | Raja Sekhar | Tarun, Pallavi | | |
| D E C | 21 | Sakutumba Saparivaara Sametam | S. V. Krishna Reddy | Akkineni Nageswara Rao, Srikanth, Suhasini Maniratnam, Jayalakshmi | | |
| D E C | 21 | Tirumala Tirupati Venkatesa | Sathibabu | Srikanth, Ravi Teja, Roja, Maheswari | | |
| D E C | 22 | Unmadi | T. Krishna | Surya, Sishwa, Ranjani | | |
| D E C | 29 | Chalo Assembly | Narayana Murthy | Narayana Murthy, Usha | | |
| D E C | 29 | Rojuko Roja | G. J. Raja | Raja Vikram, Rashmita, Swapna Sri | | |

== See also ==
- List of Telugu films of 1999
- Lists of Telugu-language films
- List of Telugu films of 2001
