= List of Telugu films of 1997 =

This is a list of films produced by the Tollywood (Telugu language film industry) based in Hyderabad in the year 1997.

== List of released films ==
Title	Director	Cast	Music director	Sources
Aahvaanam	S. V. Krishna Reddy	Srikanth, Ramya Krishna, Heera Rajagopal	S. V. Krishna Reddy	
Aaro Pranam	K. Veery	Vineeth, Soundarya, S. P. Balasubrahmanyam, Lakshmi	K. Veeru	
Abbayi Gari Pelli	Sarath	Suman, Simran Bagga, Sanghavi	Koti	
Annamayya	K. Raghavendra Rao	Nagarjuna Akkineni, Mohan Babu, Ramya Krishna, Suman, Kasthuri, Roja Selvamani, Sujatha	M. M. Keeravani	
Bala Ramayanam	Guna Sekhar	Jr. NTR, Suhani	Madhavapeddi Suresh	
Chilakkottudu	E. V. V. Satyanarayana	Jagapati Babu, Rajendra Prasad Ramya Krishna	Koti	
Chinnabbayi	K. Viswanath	Daggubati Venkatesh, Ramya Krishna, Ravali, Srividya	Ilayaraja	
Collector Garu	B. Gopal	Mohan Babu, Sakshi Shivanand, Brahmanandam	Koti	
Devudu	Raviraja Pinisetty	Balakrishna, Ramya Krishna	Sirpy	
Dongaata	Kodi Ramakrishna	Jagapati Babu, Soundarya, Suresh	Ramani Bhardawaj	
Egire Paavurama	S. V. Krishna Reddy	Srikanth, Laila Mehdin, J. D. Chakravarthy, Suhasini Maniratnam	S. V. Krishna Reddy	
Gokulamlo Seeta	Muthyala Subbaiah	Pawan Kalyan, Raasi	Koti	
Hitler	Muthyala Subbaiah	Chiranjeevi, Rajendra Prasad, Rambha	Koti	
Jai Bajarangabhali	T. Prabhakar	Rajendra Prasad, Indraja, Kota,	Koti	
Korukunna Priyudu	Muppalaneni Shiva	Vadde Naveen, Prema	Koti	
Kurralla Rajyam	Boyapati Kameswara Rao	Ali, Anand	Vandemataram Sreenivas	
Maa Nannaku Pelli	E. V. V. Satyanarayana	Krishnam Raju, Simran Bagga, Srikanth	Koti	
Mama Bagunnava	Kodi Ramakrishna	Rajendra Prasad, Naresh, Rambha	Vidyasagar	
Master	Suresh Krishna	Chiranjeevi, Roshini, Sakshi Shivanand	Deva	
Muddula Mogudu	A. Kodandarami Reddy	Balakrishna, Meena, Brahmanandam	Koti	
Oka Chinna Maata	Muthyala Subbaiah	Jagapati Babu, Indraja	Ramani Bhardawaj	
Omkaram	Upendra	Rajasekhar, Prema, Bhagyashree	Hamsalekha	
Osey Ramulamma	Dasari Narayana Rao	Vijayashanti, Ramki, Rami Reddy	Vandemataram Srinivas	
Pattukondi Chuddam	Siva Nageswara Rao	Suresh, Sudhakar, Sanghavi, Jayasudha	Koti	
Peddannayya	Sharat	Balakrishna, Roja Selvamani, Achyuth	Koti	
Pelli	Kodi Ramakrishna	Vadde Naveen, Maheshwari, Sujatha, Pruthviraj	S. A. Rajkumar	
Pelli Chesukundam	Muthyala Subbaiah	Venkatesh, Soundarya, Laila Mehdin, Brahmanandam	Koti	
Pelli Pandiri	Kodi Ramakrishna	Jagapati Babu, Raasi, Babloo Prithiveeraj	Vandemataram Srinivas	
Preminchukundam Raa	Jayanth C. Paranjee	Daggubati Venkatesh, Anjala Zaveri	Mahesh Mahadevan	
Priya O Priya	Muppulaneni Shiva	Vadde Naveen, Abbas, Simran	Koti	
Priyaragalu	A. Kodandarami Reddy	Jagapati Babu, Soundarya, Maheswari	M. M. Keeravani	
Rukmini	Ravi Raja Pinisetty	Vineeth, Preetha Vijayakumar	Vidyasagar	
Sindhooram	Krishna Vamsi	Ravi Teja, Sanghavi, Brahmaji	Sri Kommineni	
Subhakankshalu	Bhimaneni Srinivasa Rao	Jagapathi Babu, Mantra, Raasi	S. A. Rajkumar, Koti	
Surya Putrulu	C. Umamaheswara Rao	Mammootty, Suman, Shobana	M. M. Keeravani	
Suswagatham	Bhimaneni Srinivasa Rao	Pawan Kalyan, Devayani, Raghuvaran	S. A. Rajkumar	
Taraka Ramudu	R. V. Udayakumar	Srikanth, Soundarya	Koti	
Thaali	E. V. V. Satyanarayana	Srikanth, Rajendra Prasad	Vidya Sagar	
Veedevadandi Babu	E. V. V. Satyanarayana	Mohan Babu, Shilpa Shetty, Brahmanandam	Sirpy	
Ugadi	S. V. Krishna Reddy	S. V. Krishna Reddy, Laila Mehdin	S. V. Krishna Reddy	

== See also ==
- List of Telugu films of 1996
- Lists of Telugu-language films
- List of Telugu films of 1998
