= List of Telugu films of 1998 =

This is a list of films produced by the Tollywood (Telugu language film industry) based in Hyderabad in the year 1998.

== Box office collection ==
=== Share collections ===
Rank	Title	Studio	Distributor's share
1	Choodalani Vundi	Vyjayanthi films	₹13.75 crore (equivalent to ₹62 crore or US$6.4 million in 2023)
2	Suryavamsam	Super Good Movies	₹11.25 crore (equivalent to ₹51 crore or US$5.3 million in 2023)
3	Bavagaru Bagunnara?	Anjana Production	₹10.5 crore (equivalent to ₹47 crore or US$4.9 million in 2023)
4	Tholi Prema	SSC Arts	₹10 crore (equivalent to ₹45 crore or US$4.7 million in 2023)
5	Premante Idera	Sri Lakshmi Venkateswara Art Film	₹9.5 crore (equivalent to ₹43 crore or US$4.4 million in 2023)
6	Ganesh	Suresh Productions	₹9 crore (equivalent to ₹41 crore or US$4.2 million in 2023)
7	Suswagatham	Super Good Films	₹7 crore (equivalent to ₹32 crore or US$3.3 million in 2023)
8	Aavida Maa Aavide	Jayabheri Arts Production	₹6.5 crore (equivalent to ₹29 crore or US$3.0 million in 2023)

== List of released films ==
Title	Director	Cast	Music director	Notes
Aahaa..!	Suresh Krishna	Jagapathi Babu, Sanghavi	Vandemataram Srinivas	
Aavida Maa Aavide	E. V. V. Satyanarayana	Nagarjuna Akkineni, Tabu, Heera Rajagopal	Sri	
Abhishekam	S. V. Krishna Reddy	S. V. Krishna Reddy, Rachana	S. V. Krishna Reddy	
All Rounder	T. Prabhakar	Rajendra Prasad, Sanghavi	Veena Pani	
Andaru Herole	K. Umakanth	Ali, Brahmanandam, Chandra Mohan, Tanikella Bharani, Telangana Sakuntala	Vijay	
Antahpuram	Krishna Vamsi	Soundarya, Jagapathi Babu, Sai Kumar, Prakash Raj	Ilaiyaraaja	
Auto Driver	Suresh Krishna	Nagarjuna Akkineni, Simran Bagga, Deepti Bhatnagar	Deva	
Ayanagaru	N Satya	Srikanth, Ooha, Ali	Vidyasagar	
Bavagaru Bagunnara?	Jayanth C. Paranjee	Chiranjeevi, Rambha, Rachana Banerjee, Paresh Rawal	Mani Sharma	
Chandralekha	Krishna Vamsi	Nagarjuna Akkineni, Ramya Krishna, Isha Koppikar	Sandeep Chowta	
Choodalani Vundi	Gunasekhar	Chiranjeevi, Soundarya, Anjala Zhaveri, Prakash Raj	Mani Sharma	
Daddy Daddy	Kodi Ramakrishna	ANR, Jayasudha, Harish Kumar, Raasi	Vandemataram Srinivas	
Deergha Sumangali Bhava	S. V. Krishna Reddy	Rajasekhar, Ramya Krishna, S. P. Balasubrahmanyam	S. V. Krishna Reddy	
Eshwar Alla	Ayyappa P. Sharma	P. Sai Kumar, Soundarya	Koti	
Gamyam	G. Anil Kumar	Srikanth, Ravali	Vidyasagar	
Ganesh	Tirupathi Swamy	Venkatesh, Rambha, Madhoo, Prema, Kota Srinivasa Rao	Mani Sharma	
Gillikajjalu	Muppulaleni Siva	Srikanth, Meena, Raasi, Brahmanandam	Koti	
Kante Koothurne Kanu	Dasari Narayana Rao	Dasari Narayana Rao, Jayasudha	Vandemataram Srinivas	
Kanyadanam	E. V. V. Satyanarayana	Upendra, Srikanth, Rachana	Koti	
Khaidi Garu	Om Sai Prakash	Mohan Babu, Laila	Koti	
Love Story 1999	K. Raghavendra Rao	Prabhu Deva, Vadde Naveen	Deva	
Maavidaakulu	E. V. V. Satyanarayana	Jagapati Babu, Rachana Banerjee	Koti	
Manasichi Choodu	Suresh Varma	Vadde Naveen, Raasi	Mani Sharma	
Mee Aayana Jagratha	Muthyala Ramadas	Rajendra Prasad, Roja		
Navvulata	Gopichand Nadella	Rajendra Prasad, Maheswari	M.M. Srilekha	
Nenu Premisthunnanu	E. V. V. Satyanarayana	J. D. Chakravarthy, Rachna Banerjee	Sirpy	
O Panaipothundi Babu	Siva Nageswara Rao	Suresh, Ravi Teja, Indraja, Maheswari	Vandemataram Srinivas	
Ooyala	S. V. Krishna Reddy	Meka Srikanth, Ramya Krishnan	S. V. Krishna Reddy	
Padutha Theeyaga	Kranthi Kumar	Vineeth, Heera Rajagopal	Mahesh Mahadevan	
Pandaga	Sarath	ANR, Srikanth, Raasi	M. M. Keeravani	
Pape Naa Pranam	B. V. Ramana	J. D. Chakravarthy, Meena	Koti	
Paradesi	K. Raghavendra Rao	Viswas, Madhav, Tanooja	M.M. Keeravani	
Pavitra Prema	Muthyala Subbaiah	Nandamuri Balakrishna, Laila Mehdin, Roshini	Koti	
Pelli Kanuka	Kodi Ramakrishna	Jagapati Babu, Lakshmi, Bhanumathi Ramakrishna	M.M.Keeravani	
Pelli Peetalu	S. V. Krishna Reddy	Jagapati Babu, Soundarya	S. V. Krishna Reddy	
Premante Idera	Jayanth C. Paranjee	Daggubati Venkatesh, Preity Zinta	Ramana Gogula	
Prema Pallaki	Sana Yadireddy	Suresh, Vineeth, Roja	Krishna Neeraj	
Rajahamsa	Singeetham Srinivasa Rao	Abbas, Sakshi Shivanand	M. M. Keeravani	
Priyuralu	Sakshi Sivanand, Vineeth	Bharathan	Ilayaraja	Dubbed in Malayalam as Manjeeradhwani
Rana	A. Kodandarami Reddy	Nandamuri Balakrishna, Heera Rajagopal, Bhagyashree	Koti	
Raayudu	Ravi Raja Pinisetty	Mohan Babu, Soundarya, Rachna Banerjee	Koti	
Sivayya	Suresh Varma	Rajasekhar, Sanghavi, Monica Bedi, Srihari		
Snehithulu	Muthyala Subbaiah	Vadde Naveen, Raasi		
Sri Sita Ramula Kalyanam Chootamu Raarandi	Y. V. S. Chowdary	ANR, Venkat, Chandni	M.M.Keeravani	
Srimathi Vellostha	K. Raghavendra Rao	Jagapati Babu, Devayani, Poonam	M. M. Keeravani	
Subhavartha	P. N. Ramachandra Rao	Arjun, Soundarya	Koti	
Subhalekhalu	Muppalaneni Shiva	Srikanth, Laila, Roshini	Koti	
Sultan	Sarath	Nandamuri Balakrishna, Rachna Banerjee, Roja	Koti	
Suprabhatam	Bhimaneni Srinivasa Rao	Srikanth, Raasi	Vandemataram Srinivas	
Suryavamsam	Bhimaneni Srinivasa Rao	Daggubati Venkatesh, Meena	S. A. Rajkumar	
Suryudu	Muthyala Subbaiah	Rajasekhar, Soundarya, Charan Raj, Srihari		
Tholi Prema	A. Karunakaran	Pawan Kalyan, Keerthi Reddy	Deva	
Ulta Palta	Relangi Narasimha Rao	Rajendra Prasad, Reshma	M.M.Srilekha	
W/o V. Vara Prasad	Vamsy	Vineeth, J. D. Chakravarthy	M.M.Keeravani	

== See also ==
- List of Telugu films of 1997
- Lists of Telugu-language films
- List of Telugu films of 1999
