= Pappayude Swantham Appoos =

- Promotional poster
- Directed by: Fazil
- Written by: Fazil
- Produced by: Khais
- Starring: Mammootty; Shobana; Suresh Gopi; Master Badusha; Seena Dadi
- Cinematography: Anandakuttan
- Edited by: T. R. Shekhar
- Music by: Ilaiyaraaja
- Production company: Khais Productions
- Distributed by: Swargachitra Release
- Release date: 4 September 1992
- Running time: 146 minutes
- Country: India
- Language: Malayalam

Pappayude Swantham Appoos (transl. Pappa's own Appoos) is a 1992 Indian Malayalam-language drama film, written and directed by Fazil. It stars Mammootty and Master Badusha while Shobana, Suresh Gopi and Seena Dadi also appeared in important supporting roles. The music of the movie was composed by Ilaiyaraaja.The movie explores the relationship between a father who is depressed after the death of his wife and his neglected son. Badusha won the 1992 Kerala State Film Award for Best Child Artist. The film was the commercial success at the box office and was one of the highest grossers of 1992 and played for more than 200days in theatres.

== Plot ==
Balachandran, a wealthy businessman had resorted to becoming a workaholic after being unable to cope up with the death of his wife, Bhama. During the process, he unintentionally neglects his only son, Appu. When Appu returns home from his boarding school during vacation, Balachandran promises him many things, but is unable to fulfill any of them as he is caught up with work. Meanwhile, Appu befriends his Nanny Meenakshi, much to the annoyance of Balachandran.

Meenakshi's stepbrother Rudran, after realizing that his sister stays with Balachandran (who fired him for the murder of a colleague), forcefully takes her home. Appu becomes disappointed and turns rebellious, which culminates in Balachandran hitting him. He now realises that Bhama's death was tough on his son too. He apologises and promises to bring back Meenakshi.

At Meenakshi's house, her brother objects to Balachandran's request of taking her back and he sees the way she is mistreated by her brother, leading to a fight between them, where Appu gets caught up. The attempt fails and they retreat to their summer house, deciding to let go of the thoughts of Meenakshi. Appu now gets to spend more time with his father as he had always hoped, although he misses Meenakshi. Balachandran notices that Appu's nose is lightly bleeding and takes him to his close friend, Dr. Gopan. Gopan find a serious internal haemorrhage in Appu's head, the cause of which remains a mystery. He informs that an urgent surgery is their only hope and his Professor, a famous neurosurgeon is called from Mumbai for the surgery.

The cause of the bleeding puzzles the doctors. Balachandran soon recollects the fight and recalls Rudran being the one responsible for Appu's condition. Enraged by the thought, he rushes to seek revenge, but is stopped by Gopan by shouting that if he really loves his son, he should stay with him till the operation, take care of him and pray for him. The depth of his neglect of his son, now becomes clear to him. Realizing that this was probably the only time left with his son, he takes him out as he had promised, to fulfill Appu's wish, on the eve of the scheduled operation. He even prays hoping that God would have pity upon him. Their journey takes them to Meenakshi's house, who is to be married against her wishes. Another fight happens between the two and he manages to free Meenakshi from her abusive brother. He takes her with them for one final trip where Appu (moderately under sedation) hallucinates of his mother approaching him to take him to the other side. However, when Bhama notices Balachandran crying, she walks away without Appu, implying the likelihood of Appu's survival.

== Cast ==
- Mammootty as Balachandran, Appu's Father
- Shobana as Bhama, Balachandran's wife and Appu's Mother
- Master Badusha as Appu
- Suresh Gopi as Dr. Gopan
- Varna Sundaresh as Baby Appu
- Seena Dadi as Meenakshi/Minu
- Sankaradi as the caretaker of Appu
- K. P. A. C. Sunny
- Raveendran as Rudran, Meenakshi's stepbrother
- Subair
- Kaviyoor Ponnamma as Meenakshi's mother
- Fahadh Faasil as child in the party in appu (Cameo appearance)
- T. P. Madhavan
- Santhakumari as Ammini

== Production ==
=== Casting ===
Actor Murali was originally scheduled to play Dr. Gopan, but had to withdraw from the film due to a date clash. He was replaced by Suresh Gopi.

== Track listing ==
Pappayude Swantham Appoos

Soundtrack album by Ilaiyaraaja
- Released: August 1992
- Studio: Prasad Deluxe
- Genre: Feature film soundtrack
- Language: Malayalam
- Label: Tharangini

All lyrics are written by Bichu Thirumala; all music is composed by Ilaiyaraaja.

No.	Title	Singer(s)	Length
1.	"Olathumpathu"	K. J. Yesudas
2.	"Kaaka Poocha Kokkara"	K. S. Chitra, Minmini
3.	"Enn Poove Pon Poove"	S. Janaki
4.	"Snehathin Poonchola"	K. J. Yesudas
5.	"En Poove (Bit)"	S. Janaki
6.	"Manju Paiyyum Ravil"	K. S. Chithra
7.	"Olathumpathu"	S. Janaki

== Box office ==
The film was both commercial and critical success. It ran in theaters for more than 200 days and one of the highest grosser movies of 1992 .

== Awards ==
- Kerala Film Chamber Award 1992: Most Popular Film

== Remake ==
The film was remade in Telugu as Priyaragalu (1997), with Jagapati Babu, Soundarya, Maheswari, and Master Anand Vardhan in lead roles as Mammootty, Shobana, Seena Dadi and Master Badushaa roles respectively
