= Athey Kangal =

Athey Kangal (lit. 'Same Eyes' in Tamil) or variants may refer to these in Indian media:

- Athey Kangal (1967 film), by A. C. Tirulokchandar
- Adhe Kangal (2017 film)
- Adhey Kangal (TV series), a horror soap opera
