= Thirupathi Ezhumalai Venkatesa =

- Poster
- Directed by: Rama Narayanan
- Written by: Rama Narayanan
- Produced by: N. Radha
- Starring: Prabhu; S. Ve. Shekher; Vadivelu; Roja; Urvashi; Kovai Sarala
- Cinematography: N. K. Viswanathan
- Edited by: Rajkeerthy
- Music by: S. A. Rajkumar
- Production company: Sri Thenandal Films
- Release date: 4 December 1999
- Running time: 120 minutes
- Country: India
- Language: Tamil

Thirupathi Ezhumalai Venkatesa is a 1999 Indian Tamil-language comedy film directed by Rama Narayanan. The film stars Prabhu, S. Ve. Shekher, Vadivelu, Roja, Urvashi and Kovai Sarala. It was released on 4 December 1999. The film was Rama Narayanan's 100th film and was a hit at the box office. The film was remade in Telugu as Tirumala Tirupati Venkatesa (2000) with Roja and Sarala reprising their roles, and twice in Kannada as Yaarige Beda Duddu (2001) & Govinda Gopala (2007).

== Plot ==
Venkatesa, Ezhumalai and Thirupathi are poor friends who want to become rich at any cost. Nachiappan, a bungalow watchman, has three daughters: Ragini, Padmini and Lalitha. When the owner leaves the bungalow for a vacation, Nachiappan's daughters move into it. Afterwards, Nachiappan rents his owner's top portion bungalow to Thirupathi, Ezhumalai and Venkatesa who lied about their jobs. The three men eventually marry the three women. The rest of the story is how the three men will manage their wives.

== Cast ==
- Prabhu as Venkatesa
- S. Ve. Shekher as Ezhumalai
- Vadivelu as Thirupathi
- Roja as Ragini
- Urvashi as Padmini
- Kovai Sarala as Lalitha
- Vennira Aadai Moorthy as Nachiappan
- Master Mahendran as Thirumalai/Sonachalam/Udayappa
- P. R. Varalakshmi as Alamelu
- Alphonsa
- Oru Viral Krishna Rao
- Vivek in a guest appearance
- Chandrasekhar in a guest appearance
- R. Sundarrajan in a guest appearance

== Soundtrack ==
The soundtrack was composed by S. A. Rajkumar.

Song	Singer(s)	Lyrics	Duration
"Aasai Aasai"	P. Unnikrishnan	Rama Narayanan	3:50
"Kadhalukku Thoothu Chollu"	Sujatha Mohan, Supraja, P. M. Amruda	Vairamuthu	4:13
"Nilavoda Thankatchi"	Mano, Anuradha Sriram	Kalaikumar	4:36
"Sarvam Sri Krishnarpanam"	S. P. Balasubrahmanyam, K. S. Chithra	Vaali	6:33
"Tirupathi Elumalai Venkatesa"	Mano, S. N. Surendar, Vadivelu	Palani Bharathi	4:20

== Reception ==
K. Vijiyan of New Straits Times wrote, "It is becoming common to see Kovai Sarala and Vadivelu belting each other to make the audience laugh. I prefer the subtle humour of S.V. Sekhar and his magnificent play on words". He added, "Roja, Urvasi and Kovai Sarala are dynamoes of energy and they match the heroes well". Chennai Online wrote "This is director Rama Narayanan’s 100th film and he has stayed true to his form. One can never accuse him of inconsistency. He has been a very consistent director all along. Consistently giving films that are no great shakes in the story department, a narrative style that could have done with some finesse and a star cast that one would not swoon over. This film too falls into the same pattern". Mahendran won the Dinakaran Cinema Award for Best Child Artiste.
