= Vanna Thamizh Pattu =

Vanna Thamizh Paatu
- DVD cover
- Directed by: P. Vasu
- Written by: P. Vasu
- Produced by: M. Krishnaswamy
- Starring: Prabhu; Vaijayanthi; Mani Chandana
- Cinematography: Vijay; C. Kumar
- Edited by: P. Mohanraj
- Music by: S. A. Rajkumar
- Production company: Murugan Cine Arts
- Release date: 17 November 2000
- Running time: 140 minutes
- Country: India
- Language: Tamil

Vanna Thamizh Paatu (transl. Colourful Tamil song) is a 2000 Indian Tamil-language romantic drama film directed by P. Vasu. The film stars Prabhu, débutantes Vaijayanthi and Mani Chandana. It was released on 17 November 2000. moderate success at box office

== Plot ==
Bhuvana (Vaijayanthi) is back to her village after dropping out of college. Her father Muthumanikkam (Radha Ravi), the village's Zamindar, is amazed when he listens to the song of Bhoopathy (Prabhu) and he hires Bhoopathy as a servant and singer in his house.

Muthumanikkam and his brother-in-law Rasappan (Anandaraj) are against love marriages. Thereafter, Devi (Mani Chandana), Bhuvana's sister, falls in love with Bhoopathy but Boopathy does not reciprocate it. Soon, Bhuvana's mother finds out about the marriage between Bhoopathy and her daughter Bhuvana.

A flashback is shown where Bhoopathy and Bhuvana fell in love with each other and were secretly married. Vijaya Raghunatha Bhoopathy Raja is, in fact, the son of the Zamindar Rathnavel Raghunatha Bhoopathy Raja (Prabhu). Rathnavel Raghunatha Bhoopathy Raja ordered them to first sought the blessings of Muthumanikkam and then he will bless them. Hence to win the heart of Muthumanikkam, Boopathy came as a servant to his home. Bhuvana's mother keeps the secret within her and does not inform Muthumanikkam. Rassappan and Muthumanikam sister's (Bharathi) son comes back after studies. He has a liking for Bhuvana but Bhuvana distances himself from him and also Bhoopathy keeps a watchful eye.

Afterwards, Muthumanikkam finds out that Devi is in love with Boopathy and decides to send Boopathy out from his home and also attack him. But Rasappan comes to the rescue and reveals the truth about Boopathy and Bhuvana. A small flashback is shown where Rasappan finds the real identity of Boopathy. When Muthumanikkam refuses to acknowledge the marriage and says that love marriages would not work. Rasappan talks in favour of the youngsters and tells him that understanding matters and they are waiting for his blessings and it is respect shown. When Muthumanikkam is adamant and wants his nephew to marry Bhuvana, Rasappan tells the truth that his son is actually not his. Muthumanikkam's sister was in love a guy years ago but when Muthumanikkam found out, he separated them and got her married to his friend Rasappan. Rasappan learns of his wife's pregnancy but supports her and raises her son as his own as well and had hidden the truth from Muthumanikkam all these years. Muthumanikkam understands the true love between Boopathy and Bhuvana and accepts them. Finally, Boopathy and Bhuvana are reunited with the blessings of both families.

== Cast ==
- Prabhu as Vijaya Raghunatha Bhoopathy Raja and Rathnavel Raghunatha Bhoopathy Raja
- Poonam Singar as Bhuvana (credited as Vaijayanthi)
- Mani Chandana as Devi
- Vadivelu as Velu
- Radha Ravi as Mukkalathur Muthumanikkam
- Anandaraj as Rasappan, friend and brother -in-law of Muthumanikkam
- Thyagu as Ponnusamy
- Jyothi as Bhuvana's mother
- Ravikumar as Police Inspector
- Balu Anand as Velusamy
- Besant Ravi
- Bharathi as Meenakshi
- Bhanusri as Velu's lover
- Vishal as Venu
- Veeramani
- Raviraj as Arunagiri
- Arunkumar as Jagan
- Minnal Deepa as Bhuvana's friend

== Production ==
The P.Vasu-Balu-Prabhu team comes together again ten years after they made 'Chinna Thambi'. The new film, 'Vanna Thamizh Paattu', is the eighth Vasu-Prabhu combination. Apart from wielding the megaphone, Vasu pens the story, screenplay and dialogues. The film is produced by K.Balu for Aishwaria Combines. The banner had earlier made 'Pandithurai', 'Uthamarasu', 'Paramparai' and of course the highly successful 'Chinna Thambi'. Shooting has been planned at exotic locations in Ooty, Mysore and Goa. Prabhu plays the dual role of father and son in the film. Two heroines are paired with him, both debutantes. One is Mani Chandhana and the other, Vyjayanthi. Anandraj, Radha Ravi, Bharati, Jyoti, Vadivelu, Thyagu, Bhanu and Ashwini form the supporting cast.

Vyjayanti had earlier worked under the stage name of Poonam in Tamil cinema. Despite working on Balasekaran's Solli Vidu and Thirunaal, her earlier films did not have a theatrical release.

== Soundtrack ==
Vanna Thamizh Paatu

Soundtrack album by S. A. Rajkumar
- Released: 2000
- Recorded: 2000
- Genre: Feature film soundtrack
- Length: 28:06
- Producer: S. A. Rajkumar

The film score and the soundtrack were composed by S. A. Rajkumar. The soundtrack, released in 2000, features 6 tracks with lyrics written by Vaali.

Track	Song	Singer(s)	Lyrics	Duration
1	"Enna Solli Paaduven"	Hariharan, K. S. Chithra	Vaali	5:03
2	"Kaatukuyil Pola"	S. A. Rajkumar	Vaali	4:21
3	"Nilavil Nee"	Mano, K. S. Chithra	Vaali	4:33
4	"Vanna Kathavugal"	Shankar Mahadevan	Vaali	4:50
5	"Velicham Adikuthadi"	Hariharan	Vaali	4:56
6	"Vilayaattu Vilayaattu"	Srinivas, Sujatha Mohan, Anuradha Sriram	Vaali	4:23

== Reception ==
Cinema Today wrote "The story selected by P.Vasu is a well worn-out one. Hence monotony. The songs introduced as an element of difference have turned him upside down. prabhu and Vadivelu have emerged as his saviors." Lollu Express called it "Irritating and old story". The Hindu wrote, "Director P. Vasu (who has also written the story, dialogue and screenplay) who made such films as Chinna Thambi, is too caught up in the melodrama. The film therefore drags. Maybe some tight editing could have helped!". Malini Mannath of Chennai Online wrote "'Vannathamizh Paattu' is so much a Vasu style movie that for those who have seen the director's earlier efforts, particularly 'Chinna Thambi' there will be a sense of deja vu". India Info wrote "Music by S.A.Rajkumar is a letdown and camerawork by Vijay is average. Prabhu, who has done such rustic roles before does it with ease. Ravi and Anandraj too do a good job. The heroine has nothing much to do and Vadivelu's comedy raises a few laughs".
