= Annavra Makkalu =

- VCD cover
- Directed by: Phani Ramachandra
- Written by: Phani Ramachandra
- Produced by: Y. R. Jayaraj
- Starring: Shiva Rajkumar; Maheswari; Raymon Singh
- Cinematography: B. S. Basavaraj; S. V. Srikanth
- Edited by: S. Manohar
- Music by: Rajesh Ramanath
- Production company: Shivashakti Productions
- Release date: 31 May 1996
- Running time: 151 minutes
- Country: India
- Language: Kannada

Annavra Makkalu (transl. Sons of Annavru) is a 1996 Indian Kannada-language action drama film directed by Phani Ramachandra and produced by Y. R. Jayaraj. The film stars Shiva Rajkumar, in triple roles for the first time in his career, along with Maheswari, Raymon Singh and Suneha, all making their debuts. The film's score and the soundtrack were scored by Rajesh Ramanath.

== Cast ==
- Shiva Rajkumar as Shiva/Rama/Kumar (Triple Role)
- Srinath
- Maheswari
- Raymon Singh
- Suneha
- Charan Raj
- Jai Jagadish
- Sundar Raj
- Shankar Ashwath
- Pramila Joshai
- Padma Vasanthi
- Honnavalli Krishna
- Master Anand
- M.N Lakshmi Devi

== Plot ==
Triplets of the famous DCP Annayya get separated at birth and come together after many years to fight the villains who were responsible for their father's death.

== Soundtrack ==
The soundtrack of the film was composed by Rajesh Ramanath.

Track listing
| No. | Title | Singer(s) | Length |
|---|---|---|---|
| 1. | "Baaro Baaro Nanna Shiva" | Manjula Gururaj |
| 2. | "Hogabeda Hudugi Nanna Bittu" | Rajesh Krishnan, Chandrika Gururaj |
| 3. | "Oh Jaana Neene Nanna" | S. P. Balasubrahmanyam, Swarnalatha |
| 4. | "Aadabeku Raja" | Rajesh Krishnan, Swarnalatha |
| 5. | "Annavra Makkalu Naavu" | S. P. Balasubrahmanyam, Rajesh Krishnan |
