= Pittala Dora (film) =

1997 Telugu-language comedy-drama film

- Directed by: Sana Yadi Reddy
- Screenplay by: Sana Yadi Reddy
- Story by: G. V. Amareswara Rao
- Dialogues by: L. B. Sriram
- Produced by: S. Bhagya Lakshmi
- Starring: Ali; Indraja; Kota Srinivasa Rao; Babu Mohan; Brahmanandam; Tanikella Bharani
- Cinematography: K. Rajendra Prasad
- Music by: Ramani Bharadwaj
- Production company: Sana Creations
- Release date: 21 June 1996
- Country: India
- Language: Telugu

Pittala Dora (transl. Pittala Dora) is a 1996 Telugu-language comedy-drama film directed by Sana Yadi Reddy and produced by S. Bhagya Lakshmi under the banner of Sana Creations. The film stars Ali, Indraja, Kota Srinivasa Rao, Babu Mohan, Tanikella Bharani, and Brahmanandam in key roles.

The film marked Sana Yadi Reddy's directorial debut. Ali's performance in the film won him a Nandi Special Jury Award. The film was commercially successful and the song "Amma Amma," featuring Babu Mohan became quiet popular.

== Plot ==
Venkatramudu, a kind-hearted man, faces challenges when his sister Malliswari falls in love with Chinna, the son of a wealthy and manipulative man, Sambhulingam. Sambhulingam agrees to their marriage but imposes an impossible condition: Venkatramudu must raise ₹25,000 within a month. Despite his determination, Venkatramudu’s efforts are in vain as Sambhulingam deceitfully takes the money and expels him from the house.

The plot takes a dramatic turn when Venkatramudu learns that Malliswari is not his biological sister but Sambhulingam's niece. He uncovers a darker truth—that Sambhulingam murdered Malliswari's parents, seizing their wealth and property. Determined to seek justice, Venkatramudu infiltrates Sambhulingam’s household by pretending to be the long-lost son of a wealthy family. Using his disguise, he gains proximity to Sambhulingam’s daughter, forming a romantic bond as part of his plan to expose Sambhulingam’s misdeeds.

The climax sees Venkatramudu, along with Chinna and the help of Sambhulingam's daughter and a servant, devising an elaborate scheme. They trap Sambhulingam in a fantastical scenario that forces him to confess his crimes. This confession ultimately leads to his downfall and arrest, restoring justice for Malliswari and her family.

== Cast ==
- Ali as Venkatramudu
- Indraja
- Kota Srinivasa Rao as Sambhulingam
- Babu Mohan
- Chinna
- Tanikella Bharani
- Brahmanandam as Sambhulingam's assistant
- Satyanarayana
- P. L. Narayana
- Jenny
- Sangeetha

== Production ==
In July 1995, Zamin Ryot reported that the editor of Anveshana paper, Sana Yadi Reddy would be producing and directing a film titled Pittala Dora starring Ali in the lead role. The film marked the directorial debut of Yadi Reddy. The cinematography was handled by K. Rajendra Prasad, while the music was composed by Ramani Bharadwaj. The dialogues were written by L. B. Sriram.

== Music ==
The film's music was composed by Ramani Bharadwaj. Lyrics were written by Sirivennela Sitarama Sastri, Jonnavittuala, Chandrabose, and Vasudeva Reddy.

The tune of the song "Amma Amma," featuring Babu Mohan was based on A. R. Rahman's '"Hamma Hamma" from the Tamil romantic drama film Bombay (1995). It gained particular attention for its comedic timing and played a significant role in the film’s success.

No.	Title	Singer(s)	Length
1.	"Nene Pittala Dorani"	Mano (singer)	4:26
2.	"Amma Amma"	Pranay Kumar	3:35
3.	"Ayyo Baboi"	Mano, Anuradha Sriram	4:02
4.	"Raave Vayyari"	Sarangapani, Vijayalakshmi, Chorus	3:45
5.	"Raave Raave"	Ramani Bharadwaj, Manikiran	4:37
6.	"Jollyga Ala"	S. P. Balasubrahmanyam, Sujatha	3:47
Total length:			24:12

== Reception ==
Andhra Today praised Pittala Dora as an engaging blend of comedy and sentiment, highlighting Ali's performance, Tanikella Bharani and Brahmanandam's comedy, and L. B. Sriram's dialogues. The review deemed the film a must-watch for comedy lovers.

== Awards ==
- Nandi Special Jury Award - Ali
