= Sishya (film) =

- Directed by: Selvaa
- Written by: Selvaa; Nagulan Ponnusamy (dialogues)
- Produced by: Tharangai V. Sunder; Tharangai V. Chandrasekhar
- Starring: Karthik; Roshini
- Cinematography: B. Bhalamurugan
- Edited by: N. Rajoo
- Music by: Deva
- Production company: Sri Rajakaali Amman Cine Arts
- Release date: 27 April 1997
- Running time: 142 minutes
- Country: India
- Language: Tamil

Sishya (transl. Disciple) is a 1997 Indian Tamil-language romantic comedy film directed by Selvaa. The film stars Karthik and Roshini and was released on 27 April 1997. It was a box office failure.

== Plot ==
Shruti, the daughter of ex prime minister, flees from Delhi to Chennai, where she falls in love with Aravindan. However, fate intervenes when the CBI locates her and sends her back to Delhi.

== Cast ==
- Karthik as Aravind
- Roshini as Shruti / Anu
- Goundamani as Aravind's friend
- Manivannan as Police inspector Malachamy
- Visu as Aadhimoolam
- Sonia as Anu, Aadhimoolam's daughter
- Thyagu
- Vivek
- Nizhalgal Ravi as C.B.I Ashok Narayanan
- Crazy Mohan as Manager
- Chitti Babu as Minister
- Gowtham Sundararajan as Gowtham
- Mohan V. Ram
- Vichu Vishwanath
- LIC Narasimhan
- Vichithra as Special appearance in "O Lamba" song

== Soundtrack ==
The soundtrack was composed by Deva.

Track listing
No.	Title	Lyrics	Singer(s)	Length
1.	"Yaro Azhaithadhu"	Palani Barathi	Hariharan, Uma Ramanan	5:20
2.	"Apollo Apollo"	Vaasan	Swarnalatha, Karthik	4:56
3.	"Thigu Thigura"	Palani Barathi	Hariharan	5:04
4.	"O Lamba"	Palani Barathi	Sabesh, Gopal Rao	4:46
5.	"Bombay Dyeing"	Vaasan	S. Janaki, S. P. Balasubrahmanyam	3:11
Total length:				23:17

== Critical reception ==
K. N. Vijiyan of New Straits Times wrote, "All in all, humour is a strong element in [Sishya]. That alone saves the movie from being a mediocre effort".
