= Nidurinchu Jahapana =

2025 Indian Telugu-language film by Prasanna Kumar Devarapalli

- Theatrical release poster
- Directed by: Prasanna Kumar Devarapalli
- Written by: Prasanna Kumar Devarapalli
- Produced by: Sam; G. Vamsi Krishna Varma
- Starring: Aanand Vardhan; Navami Gayak; Roshni Sahota
- Cinematography: Anand Reddy Nadakatla
- Edited by: Nani Babu Karumanchi
- Music by: Anup Rubens
- Production company: AR Entertainments
- Release date: 14 February 2025
- Country: India
- Language: Telugu

Nidurinchu Jahapana is a 2025 Indian Telugu-language romantic drama film written and directed by Prasanna Kumar Devarapalli. The film features Aanand Vardhan, Navami Gayak and Roshni Sahota in lead roles.

The film was released on 14 February 2025.

== Cast ==
- Aanand Vardhan as Veeru
- Navami Gayak as Sitara
- Roshni Sahota as Madhura
- Ramaraju
- Posani Krishna Murali
- Kancharapalem Raju as Veeru's father
- Kalpa Latha as Jayamma, Veeru's mother
- Viren Thambidorai as Nayan
- Gemini Suresh
- Jabardasth Santhikumar

== Music ==
All music is composed by Anup Rubens.

| No. | Title | Lyrics | Singer(s) | Length |
|---|---|---|---|---|
| 1. | "Hailesso Hailessa" | Prasanna Kumar | Dhanunjay Seepana | 3:00 |
| 2. | "Aasa Aasa Allari Aasa" | Shreshta | Sruthi Ranjani | 4:46 |
| 3. | "Idena Idena" | Kalyan Chakravarthy | Geetha Madhuri | 5:14 |

== Release and reception ==
Nidurinchu Jahapana was released on 14 February 2025.

Andhra Jyothi gave a mixed review and is particularly critical of screenplay and story.
