= Sarkaaru Noukari =

2024 Indian film

- Theatrical release poster
- Directed by: Ganganamoni Shekar
- Written by: Ganganamoni Shekar
- Produced by: K. Raghavendra Rao
- Starring: Akash Goparaju; Bhavana Vazhapandal; Tanikella Bharani; Mani Chandana
- Cinematography: Ganganamoni Shekar
- Edited by: Raghavendra Varma
- Music by: Sandilya Pisapati
- Production company: R.K Teleshow Pvt Ltd
- Release date: 1 January 2024
- Running time: 147 minutes
- Country: India
- Language: Telugu

Sarkaaru Noukari is a 2024 Indian Telugu language drama film written and directed by Ganganamoni Shekar. Produced by K. Raghavendra Rao under R.K Teleshow Private Limited, it stars Akash Goparaju, Bhavana Vazhapandal, Tanikella Bharani, Mani Chandana, Sammeta Gandhi and Vadlamani Srinivas in lead roles. The film was theatrically released in India on 1 January 2024.

== Plot ==
Gopal (Akash Goparaju), a government employee, is tasked with promoting Condom usage to prevent the spread of AIDS in villages. He marries Satya (Bhavana Vazhapandal), who strongly opposes Gopal's job. Despite Satya's threat to leave if he does not resign, Gopal persists in his role. The movie delves into Gopal's unwavering dedication and its impact on his relationship with Satya. The narrative revolves around Gopal's efforts to raise awareness among villagers and explores the consequences of his choices on his personal life.

== Cast ==
- Akash Goparaju as Gopal
- Bhavana Vazhapandal as Satya
- Tanikella Bharani as Sarpanch of kollapur
- Mani Chandana as Vasaki
- Sammetha Gandhi as Rambabu
- Vadlamani Srinivas a Sreenu
- Mahadev as Shiva
- Madhu Latha as Ganga
- Sudhakar Reddy as Ramu

== Soundtrack ==
The music and background score is composed by Sandilya Pisapati. The audio rights were acquired by Mango Music.

No.	Title	Lyrics	Singer(s)	Length
1.	"Sarkaar Noukari Promotional Song"	Ganganamoni Shekar	Sunitha, Harika Narayan, Sahithi Chaganti	4:00
2.	"Neella Baaayee"	Pasunoori Ravinder	Sony Komanduri	3:10
3.	"Ni Pasupu Paadaale"	Kasarla Shyam	Sandilya Pripati, Keerthana Srinivas	4:00
4.	"Panta Chetiki Vacheyala"	Ganganamoni Shekar	Sri Soumya Varanasi	3:04
5.	"Vaithalika"	Sira Sri	Spoorthi Jitender	4:29
6.	"Thode veedindhi"	Pasunoori Ravinder	Sai Charan	1:28
Total length:				20:11

== Release ==
=== Theatrical ===
Sarkaaru Noukari was released theatrically on 1 January 2024.

=== Home media ===
The digital streaming of the film was sold to Amazon Prime. The film was made available from 12 January 2024 in Telugu.

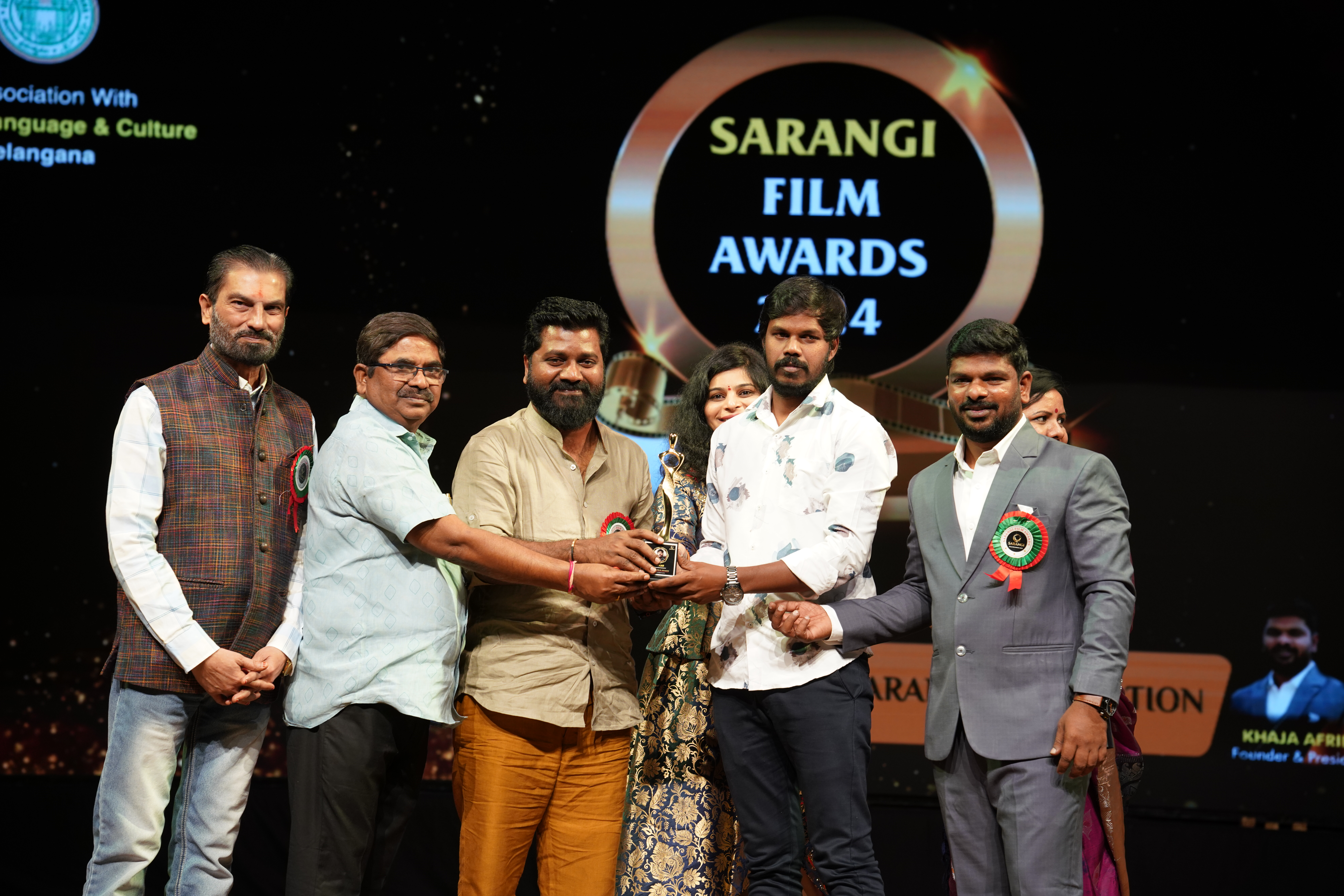
Ganganamoni Shekar Received Best DOP award for Sarkaaru Noukari at Singindi Film Awards 2024 in Ravindrabharathi

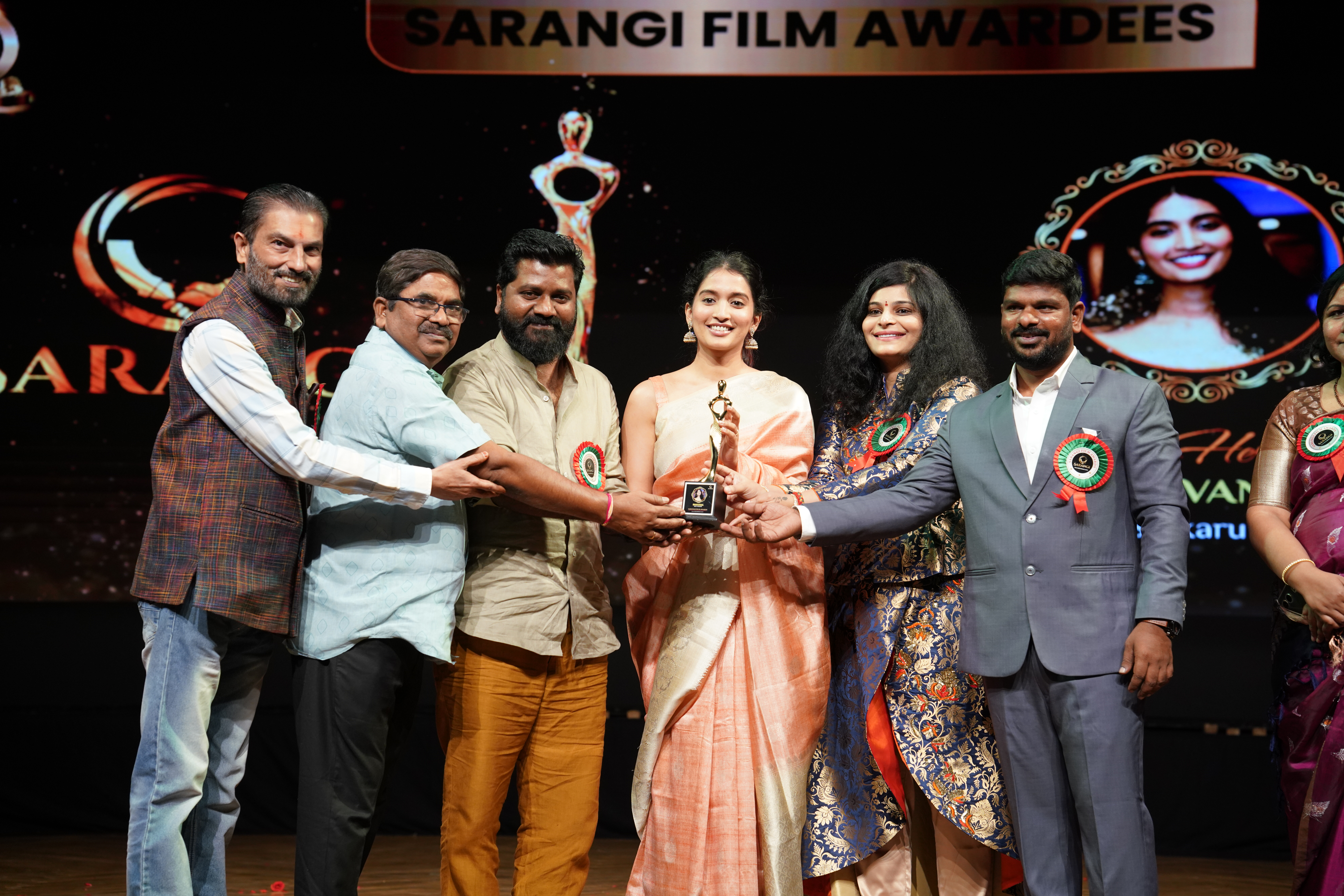
Bhavana Received Best female Debut actress award for Sarkaaru Noukari at Sarangi Film Awards 2024

== Reception ==
A critic from 123Telugu gave the film 2.5/5 stars and stated that "Sarkaaru Noukari addresses a significant societal concern, yet the film falls short in maintaining a captivating storyline from start to finish."

Raisa Nasreen from Times Now gave the film 3/5 stars and wrote that "Sarkaaru Noukari is a Stirring Story of Taboos and Realities in Rural Settings" and a critic from Eenadu stated that "Sarkaaru Noukari's Striving is Commendable, Yet Entertainment Aspect is Lacking".

A critic from V6 News stated that "The Hero's Endeavor to Promote AIDS Awareness Could Have Been Depicted with Greater Force". A critic from Sakshi Post gave the film 2.5/5 stars and wrote "The Hero character's efforts to talk about AIDS don't come across well in the movie. Some parts of the story are slow, like in art films."

Srivathsan Nadadhur from OTTPlay gave the film 2.5/5 stars and wrote that "Sarkaaru Naukari, a film unfolding the dynamics between a couple navigating a societal taboo in the 90s, proves only partially captivating. The humor lacks sharpness, the drama doesn't consistently hold attention, but the film is nearly salvaged by compelling performances, cinematography, and music."

Sarkaaru Naukari earns a 2/5 from an Indiaglitz critic, recognizing the director's dedication and the cast's talent. Yet, the film is criticized for lacking a distinctive narrative approach, preventing it from making a memorable impact. Despite effectively portraying government job challenges, it falls short of providing the unique perspective needed to truly captivate the audience.
