= List of Telugu films of 1999 =

This is a list of films produced by the Tollywood (Telugu language film industry) based in Hyderabad in the year 1999.

== List of released films ==
Title	Director	Cast	Music director	Source
A. K. 47	Om Prakash Rao	P. Sai Kumar, Chandni, Om Puri	Hamsalekha	
Aavide Syamala	Kodi Ramakrishna	Prakash Raj, Ramya Krishna	Madavapeddi Suresh	
Alludugaaru Vachcharu	Ravi Raja Pinisetty	Jagapati Babu, Kausalya, Heera Rajagopal	M.M.Keeravani	
Ammo Polisollu		Siva Krishna, Ragini		
Anaganaga Oka Ammai	Ramesh Sarangan	Srikanth, Soundarya, Abbas, Raghuvaran	Mani Sharma	
Asala Sandadi	Anil Kishore	Ali, Sangeetha, Brahmanandam, Ranganath	Ramani Bharadwaj	
Bobbili Vamsam	K. S. Adhiyaman	Rajasekhar, Meena, Shruti	M. M. Srilekha	
Chinni Chinni Aasa	Relangi Narasimha Rao	Rajendra Prasad, Indraja	Raj	
Devi	Kodi Ramakrishna	Prema, Bhanuchander, Sowkar Janaki	Devi Sri Prasad	
Dollar Dreams	Sekhar Kammula	Satya Krishnan, Anish Kuruvilla		
English Pellam East Godavari Mogudu	Doraswamy Raju	Srikanth, Ramya Krishna	Mani Sharma	
Harischandraa	Thulasi Kumar	J. D. Chakravarthy, Raasi, Brahmanandam	Agosh	
Hello...Yama!	Pavithran	Suresh, Kota Srinivasa Rao, Babu Mohan	Vandemataram Srinivas	
Iddaru Mitrulu	K. Raghavendra Rao	Chiranjeevi, Ramya Krishna, Sakshi Shivanand	Mani Sharma	
Krishna Babu	Muthyala Subbaiah	Nandamuri Balakrishna, Raasi, Meena, Abbas, Chandra Mohan	Koti	
Maa Balaji	Kodi Ramakrishna	Vadde Naveen, Maheshwari, Brahmanandam	Vandemataram Srinivas	
Manasulo Maata	S. V. Krishna Reddy	Jagapati Babu, Meka Srikanth, Mahima Chowdhary	S. V. Krishna Reddy	
Manavudu Danavudu		Krishna, Soundarya, Ramya Krishna	S. A. Rajkumar	
Manikyam	Muthyala Subbaiah	Srikanth, Devayani, Sanghavi	S. A. Rajkumar	
Mechanic Mavayya	Rajendra Singh Babu	Rajasekhar, Rambha, S. P. Balasubrahmanyam, Paresh Rawal	M. M. Keeravani	
Naa Hrudayamlo Nidurinche Cheli	AVS Adi Narayana	Vadde Naveen, Laila	Sri	
Nee Kosam	Srinu Vaitla	Ravi Teja, Maheshwari	R. P. Patnaik	
Neti Gandhi	E. V. V. Satyanarayana	Rajasekhar, Raasi	S. A. Rajkumar	
Panchadara Chilaka	Kodi Ramakrishna	Srikanth, Kausalya	S. A. Rajkumar	
Pilla Nachindi	E. V. V. Satyanarayana	Srikanth, Sanghavi, Rachana Banerjee	Koti	
Pedda Manushulu	Boyina Subba Rao	Suman, Rachna Banerjee, Heera Rajagopal	Eeshwar	
Prema Katha	Ram Gopal Varma	Sumanth, Antara Mali, Manoj Bajpai	Sandeep Chowta	
Premaku Velayera	S. V. Krishna Reddy	J. D. Chakravarthy, Soundarya, Prakash Raj, Ravi Teja	S. V. Krishna Reddy	
Prema Kosam	Veera Shankar	Venkat, Vineeth, Flora Saini,	Raj	
Preminche Manasu	AVS Adi Narayana	Vadde Naveen, Keerthi Reddy, Ravi Teja, Srihari	S. A. Rajkumar	
Preyasi Raave	Chandra Mahesh	Srikanth, Raasi, Sanghavi	M. M. Srilekha	
Raja	Muppulaneni Siva	Daggubati Venkatesh, Soundarya, Abbas	S. A. Rajkumar	
Raja Kumarudu	K. Raghavendra Rao	Mahesh Babu, Preity Zinta, Prakash Raj	Mani Sharma	
Ramasakkanodu	Sagar	Suman, Maheshwari, S. P. Balasubrahmanyam	Koti	
Ravoyi Chandamama	Jayanth C. Paranjee	Nagarjuna Akkineni, Anjala Zhaveri, Keerthi Reddy, Jagapati Babu	Mani Sharma	
Sambayya	K. S. Nageswara Rao	Srihari, Radhika Chaudhari, Prakash Raj	Vandemataram Srinivas	
Samarasimha Reddy	B. Gopal	Nandamuri Balakrishna, Simran Bagga, Anjala Zhaveri, Sanghavi	Mani Sharma	
Samudram	Krishna Vamsi	Jagapati Babu, Sakshi Shivanand, Ravi Teja, Prakash Raj	Shashi Pritham	
Seenu	Sashi	Daggubati Venkatesh, Twinkle Khanna, Prakash Raj	Mani Sharma	
Seetharama Raju	YVS Chowdhary	Nagarjuna Akkineni, Sakshi Shivanand, Harikrishna Nandamuri, Sanghavi	M. M. Keeravani	
Sneham Kosam	K. S. Ravikumar	Chiranjeevi, Meena, Vijayakumar, Radhika	S. A. Rajkumar	
Speed Dancer	Muppalaneni Shiva	Raghava Lawrence, Monica Bedi		
Sri Ramulayya	Nimmala Shankar	Mohan Babu, Soundarya, Brahmanandam, Chalapathi Rao	Vandemataram Srinivas	
Sultan	Sarath	Nandamuri Balakrishna, Deepti Bhatnagar, Krishnam Raju, Krishna, Roja Selvamani, Rachana Banerjee	Koti	
Surya Putrika				
Swapnalokam	Bhimaneni Srinivasa Rao	Jagapati Babu, Raasi, Brahmanandam	Vandemataram Srinivas	
Swayamvaram	K. Vijaya Bhaskar	Venu, Laya, Sunil	Vandemataram Srinivas	
Thammudu	P. A. Arun Prasad	Pawan Kalyan, Aditi Gowitrikar, Preeti Jhangiani, Kamal Kumar	Ramana Gogula	
Telangana		Suresh, Srihari, Indraja, Vinod Kumar	Koti	
Veedu Samanyudu Kadhu	Uppalapati Narayana Rao	Prakash Raj, Raasi, Sanghavi	Vidhyasagar	
Velugu Needalu	Mourya	Meena, Venkat, Jayaprada, Bhanu Chander, Suresh, Maheswari, M. S. Reddy	M. M. Srilekha	
Vichitram	Jandhyala	Gajjal Srinivas, Charmy Kaur, Brahmanandam	Raj–Koti	
Yamajathakudu	N. Shankar	Mohan Babu, Rajendra Prasad, Sakshi Shivanand, Brahmanandam	Vandemataram Srinivas	

== Dubbed films ==
Title	Director	Cast	Music director	Source
Kama	Ashok Kumar	Vishal, Sunila, Urvashi	Adityan	
Gurupoornima	Rama Narayanan	Napolean, Nagma		

== See also ==
- List of Telugu films of 1998
- Lists of Telugu-language films
- List of Telugu films of 2000
