= Subhalekhalu =

- DVD cover
- Directed by: Muppalaneni Shiva
- Screenplay by: Muppalaneni Shiva
- Story by: Anitha
- Dialogue by: Madhura Raja
- Produced by: Nandamuri Ramakrishna
- Starring: Srikanth; Laila; Roshini
- Cinematography: K. Shankar
- Edited by: Vemuri Ravi
- Music by: Koti
- Production company: Ramakrishna Horticultural Cine Studios
- Release date: 13 November 1998
- Country: India
- Language: Telugu

Subhalekhalu (transl. Wedding invitations) is a 1998 Indian Telugu-language romantic drama film directed by Muppalaneni Shiva and produced by Ramakrishna Horticultural Cine Studios. It stars Srikanth, Laila and Roshini. The film was released to mixed reviews and was a box office failure.

== Plot ==
A young woman falls in love with a handsome man, who rejects her advances immediately. However, she keeps pursuing him to win him over and to prove her love towards him is pure.

== Cast ==
- Srikanth as Sri
- Laila as Manasa
- Roshini as Priya
- Satyanarayana as Manasa's father
- Annapoorna as Manasa's mother
- Sudhakar as Manasa's uncle
- AVS as a doubtful man
- Babu Mohan as an indecisive man
- Kota Srinivasa Rao
- Srihari
- Brahmanandam
- Ramaprabha
- Radha Bai
- Chalapathi Rao
- Gautham Raju
- Kallu Chidambaram
- Ranganath (guest appearance)
- Nandamuri Harikrishna (guest appearance)

== Soundtrack ==
The songs are composed by Koti and were released under the Anand Audio label.

Track listing
No.	Title	Lyrics	Singer(s)	Length
1.	"Suswagatham"	Sirivennela Seetharama Sastry	S. P. Balasubramanyam, K. S. Chitra	5:10
2.	"Lipstick Pedala"	Bhuvana Chandra	S. P. Balasubramanyam, Swarnalatha	4:35
3.	"O Priya Swagatham"	Sirivennela Seetharama Sastry	S. P. Balasubramanyam, K. S. Chitra	4:35
4.	"Madhura Nagaraki"	C. Narayana Reddy	S. P. Balasubramanyam, K. S. Chitra	4:39
5.	"Andala O Meghamaala"	K. Premachandra	S. P. Balasubramanyam, Swarnalatha	4:40
6.	"Vadhuve Raave Naa"	V. Venkatesh	S. P. Balasubramanyam, K. S. Chitra	4:13
7.	"Shlokam bit"		S. P. Balasubramanyam	0:55

== Reception ==
Griddaluru Gopala Rao of Zamin Ryot praised the music, lyrics, picturisation of the songs, and other technical aspects but criticised the screenplay as a cliched triangular love story. Rakesh P. of Deccan Herald called it a "good family entertainer" and stated: "Though the pace is a bit slow, a tightly-edited screenplay by director Muppalaneni Siva keeps it lively." A critic from Andhra Today wrote, "Director Muppalaneni Siva has not taken proper care in making the movie and as a result it fails to captivate the audience".
