= Mani Chandana =

Indian actress

- Occupation: Actress
- Years active: 1998–2003; 2017–present

Mani Chandana is an Indian actress who has appeared primarily in Telugu films. She returned to the film industry in the late 2010s portraying supporting roles.

== Career ==
Mani Chandana appeared in Kannada, Telugu and Tamil language films in the early 2000s. She notably also appeared in an item number in the Mahesh Babu-starrer Nijam (2003). Towards the end of her career as a lead actress, she worked on T. Shivraj's Tamil film Enakke Enakka, which eventually did not have a theatrical release.

Following a sabbatical away from the film industry after her wedding, Mani Chandana returned in the late 2010s to portray supporting roles in Telugu films such as Ungarala Rambabu (2017) and Achari America Yatra (2018).

== Filmography ==
Year	Title	Role	Language	Notes
1998	Tholi Prema	Anil's fiancé	Telugu	Uncredited role
1999	Pilla Nachindi	Kajol	Telugu	
2000	Kiladi		Kannada	
2000	Pellam Vachindi	Menaka	Telugu	
2000	Manasichanu		Telugu	
2000	Tensionlo Tension		Telugu	
2000	NTR Nagar		Telugu	
2000	Vanna Thamizh Pattu	Devi	Tamil	
2001	Little Hearts		Telugu	Special appearance
2002	Vamshakobba		Kannada	
2002	Devi Nagamma		Telugu	
2003	Nijam	Rathalu	Telugu	Special appearance
2017	Ungarala Rambabu		Telugu	
2018	Achari America Yatra		Telugu	
2019	Burra Katha	Abhi/Ram’s mother	Telugu	
2021	Naandhi	Meenakshi's mother	Telugu	
2024	Sarkaaru Noukari	Vasaki	Telugu	
2024	Mr. Bachchan	Mutyam Prabhavathi	Telugu	
2024	Devara: Part 1	Thangam’s mother	Telugu	
2024	Bhale Unnade	Krishna’s mother	Telugu	
2025	Mazaka	Bhargav Varma's wife	Telugu	
2026	Seetha Payanam		Telugu	
2026	Nawab Cafe	Raja’s mother	Telugu	
2026	Bachchala Malli	Padma	Telugu	
