= Pittala Dora =

Pittala Dora is a storyteller that visits cities during Dasara in Andhra Pradesh and Telangana to entertain people through their comedy.

== Background ==
The origin of Pittala Doras is unknown. Pittala Doras come from agricultural backgrounds and visit cities to make money. Pittala Doras dress in khakhi clad with a pith hat similar to the policeman during the British times. They also carry a wooden stick, defunct rifle or a toy, which has earned them the name Thupaki Ramudu. To entertain the audience, they tell stories, lies, brag and make false promises. The tradition of Pittala Doras is passed on from generation to generation. They are known to be able to talk for long amounts of time without break.

With the advent of technology, the tradition of Pittala Doras is dying down; however, politicians are interested in reviving the tradition for campaigning. Pittala Doras have been subject to criticism nowadays, with some people dubbing them as beggars, and they are mainly present during the Dasara festival times. The term pittala dora can also be used for someone who tells lies.

== In popular culture ==
Ali acted as a pittala dora in the namesake 1996 film directed by Sana Yadireddy, the editor of the Anveshana newspaper. He won the Nandi Special Jury Award for his performance.
