= Adhey Kangal (TV series) =

Tamil-language horror soap opera

- Genre: Soap opera
- Directed by: Francis Pappu
- Starring: Maheswari; Bharathi
- Country of origin: India
- Original language: Tamil
- No. of seasons: 1
- No. of episodes: 156

Production
- Cinematography: Mahesh Haran
- Camera setup: Multi-camera
- Running time: approx. 24-28 minutes per episode

Original release
- Network: Jaya TV
- Release: 17 February – 26 September 2014

Adhe Kangal is a 2014 Tamil-language horror soap opera aired on Jaya TV from 17 February 2014 to 26 September 2014 on Monday and Friday at 10:00PM (IST) for 156 episodes.

The show stars by Maheswari, and Bharathi, and was directed by Francis Pappu. This story revolves around the family of that girl and the financial and personal problems they face, along with the story of a ghost.

== Plot ==
Adhe Kangal is the story about a ghost Nagavali, which begins with a couple returning from a movie theatre. On the way back, their bike tire bursts. As it is midnight and in the middle of a highway, the couple decide to take a short-cut to reach the town. They pass a particular place where an old man warns them to return as this place is haunted by the ghost "Nagavali". The couple don't listen to the old man, and they continue to go that way.

Meanwhile, two men notice the lovers, and try to rape the girl. She suddenly changes her voice to sound like a ghost and scares them, they ran away! It was not the ghost, but the girl who, to save her boyfriend and herself, acts this way to frighten those men. But when those men reach the particular place, Nagavali kills them both. This story continues, revolving around the family of the girl, and the financial and personal problems they face, along with the story of this ghost.

== Cast ==
- Maheswari as Uma
- Bharathi as Nagavalli/Shakthi
- Bharath Kalyan
- Shwetha
- Sarath
- Swapna
- Deepa Jayan

== International broadcast ==
The Series was released on 17 February 2014 on Jaya TV. The show was also broadcast internationally in the Middle East, Asia, Europe, Australia and New Zealand on Jaya TV.

- It aired in Singapore Satellite Channel on Mio Jaya TV.
- It aired in Australia and New Zealand Channel on Global Tamil Vision.
- It aired in Malaysia Satellite Channel on Astro, airs Monday to Friday at 11:30AM (MST)
- It aired in Canada Tamil-language Channel on ATN Jaya TV.
