= Master (1997 film) =

1997 Telugu film by Suresh Krissna

- Theatrical poster
- Directed by: Suresh Krissna
- Written by: Bhupati Raja; Satyanand (dialogues)
- Produced by: Allu Aravind
- Starring: Chiranjeevi; Sakshi Sivanand; Roshini
- Cinematography: Chota K. Naidu
- Edited by: Vellaiswamy
- Music by: Deva
- Distributed by: Geetha Arts
- Release date: 3 October 1997
- Country: India
- Language: Telugu

Master is a 1997 Indian Telugu-language action drama film directed by Suresh Krissna and produced by Allu Aravind. The film stars Chiranjeevi in the title role, alongside Sakshi Sivanand, Roshini, Vijayakumar, Puneet Issar and Satya Prakash. The film's music was composed by Deva, with cinematography handled by Chota K. Naidu.

Notably, Master marked the first time Chiranjeevi sang a song in his career. The film also introduced DTS (Digital Theater Systems) sound technology to Telugu cinema. The film was released on October 3, 1997, with 121 prints across 200 theatres, the highest for any Telugu film at the time. Master received praise for Chiranjeevi's performance and its innovative sound design and became a commercial blockbuster.

== Plot ==
Janardhan Rao, a college principal, is keen on inculcating discipline in the students. He gets his protégé, Rajkumar, posted as a Telugu lecturer in the college. Rajkumar soon mingles with the students and becomes a comrade in arms and fools around with them, in order to control them. One of his students, Kanchana, falls for Rajkumar, and proposes to him, but Rajkumar refuses her politely, saying that she will rescind her proposal if she comes to know about his past.

Past: During his undergraduate in New Delhi, Rajkumar fell in love with Preeti, Janardhan Rao's daughter. When Preeti's fellow classmate, Vikram, proposed to her, she rejected his proposal, for which, Vikram killed her in a rage. In turn, Rajkumar killed Vikram and was sentenced to prison for five years. After serving the prison term, Rajkumar arrived back as a lecturer.

Present: Rajkumar parts ways with Kanchana telling her that he cannot even think of loving any one else other than Preeti. One day, Rajkumar and Janardhan Rao come across Vikram, who was supposed to have been killed by him. Shocked, Rajkumar chases after him, but Janardhan Rao stops him and tells him that Preeti's killer is actually D. R., a notorious crime boss and Vikram's brother. When confronted by Rajkumar, Janardhan tells him that since he had already lost five years of his life, he did not want to rake the past by telling him what he learned just now, in fear of losing him again.

Janardhan also makes Rajkumar promise that he will not go after D. R. and Vikram. Helpless, Rajkumar accepts the promise and controls his anger. Later, Rajkumar's student, Dilip, falls in love with D. R.'s daughter. Mortally afraid of D. R., they both approach Rajkumar for his help in getting them married. He convinces Janardhan Rao about his involvement and takes his consent. In his attempts to get them married, Rajkumar confronts the goons sent by D. R. and Vikram. However, though he is successful, he ends up killing both the brothers and is again sentenced to five years in prison. Five years later, Rajkumar completes his prison term. He reunites with Kanchana and they happily get married, with the blessings of Janardhan Rao and his students.

== Cast ==
- Chiranjeevi as Rajkumar / Master
- Sakshi Sivanand as Kanchana
- Roshini as Preeti Rao
- Vijayakumar as B. Janardhan Rao, Rajkumar's mentor and Preeti's father
- Puneet Issar as Devaraju 'D. R.', Vikram's elder brother and a notorious crime boss
- Satya Prakash as Vikram, D. R.'s younger brother
- Venu Madhav as Venu
- Sivaji as Sivaji
- Uttej as Uttej
- Tirupathi Prakash as Prakash
- Bandla Ganesh as Ganesh
- Nutan Prasad as Michael D'Souza
- Brahmanandam as College staff member
- Dharmavarapu Subramanyam as College lecturer
- AVS as David
- Gundu Hanumantha Rao as College peon
- Jenny as College staff member
- Ajay Rathnam as Henchman
- Ananth as Ananth
- Ramjagan

== Production ==
In Master, Chiranjeevi played a modern and stylish Telugu lecturer, breaking the traditional portrayal of Telugu lecturers in cinema as conservative figures in dhotis. His character connected with students as a friend, guiding them on the right path.

For the first time in his career, Chiranjeevi sang a song in the film. Inspired by Amitabh Bachchan’s "Mere Angne Mein" in Laawaris (1981), director Suresh Krissna convinced him to sing "Thammudu... Are Thammudu", written by Sirivennela Seetharama Sastry. The song, choreographed by Raghava Lawrence, was filmed on a modern canteen set named "Canteen 2000," featuring Chiranjeevi, Sakshi Shivanand, and other supporting actors. It became a major highlight and contributed to the film’s success. A posh glass house set was built at Khairatabad flyover.

Master introduced DTS (Digital Theater Systems) sound to Telugu cinema, a major technological milestone. Although Telugu Veera Levara (1995) is sometimes mistakenly credited as the first Telugu film with DTS, it was Master that actually introduced the technology. This film also marked the first time the short-lived but trendsetting "Mega Star" title sequence was used to credit Chiranjeevi onscreen. This was the idea of director Suresh Krissna, who similarly came up with the iconic "Super Star Rajini" title card for Rajinikanth five years prior. This title card was only used in a few films up till 2002's Daddy, also starring Chiranjeevi and directed by Krissna, until an updated version of it was used in the star's 2023 film Waltair Veerayya.

== Music ==
Master

Soundtrack album by Deva
- Released: 1997
- Genre: Feature film soundtrack
- Label: Lahari Music

The music for the film was composed by Deva.

Track list
No.	Title	Lyrics	Singer(s)	Length
1.	"Thammudu Are Thammudu"	Sirivennela Seetharama Sastry	Chiranjeevi	6:06
2.	"Intiloki"	Chandrabose	Rajesh, Sowmya	5:08
3.	"B.Sc. Aynagani"	Chandrabose	Krishnaraj, Rajesh, Chandrabose	5:33
4.	"Thilottama"	Chandrabose	Hariharan, Sujatha	5:32
5.	"Baavunnaara"	Chandrabose	Rajesh, Sowmya	5:55
Total length:				28:14

== Reception ==
=== Box office ===
The film was released on October 3, 1997, with 121 prints across 200 theatres, the highest for any Telugu film at the time. Despite receiving some mixed word of mouth in its first week, Master performed well at the box office, earning ₹5.5 crore in its initial two weeks. By the third week, collections increased significantly, turning the film into a commercial success.

=== Critical reception ===
The film was reviewed by Zamin Ryot. A critic from Andhra Today wrote, "The main attraction in the movie is a song by Chiranjeevi himself. Acting comes easily to him and he sailed through his role effortlessly".

== Awards ==
Nandi Awards

- Best Screenplay Writer - Bhupati Raja
