= Manasichanu =

Indian Telugu romantic drama film

- DVD cover
- Directed by: Pramod Kumar
- Written by: Pramod Kumar
- Produced by: CH Sudhakar Babu
- Starring: Ravi Teja; Mani Chandana
- Cinematography: Vasu
- Edited by: Menaka Srinivas
- Music by: Satya
- Production company: All India Entertainments
- Release date: 18 August 2000
- Country: India
- Language: Telugu

Manasichanu (transl. I gave my heart) is a 2000 Indian Telugu romantic drama film written and directed by Pramod Kumar starring Ravi Teja and Mani Chandana.

== Cast ==
- Ravi Teja as Suryakanth
- Mani Chandana
- Rami Reddy
- Sudhakar
- Tanikella Bharani
- Y. Vijaya
- Ragini
- Suthi Velu
- Gautham Raju
- Gundu Hanumantha Rao
- Uttej
- Venu Madhav
- Kallu Chidambaram
- Jenny
- Tirupathi Prakash
- Dilip Kumar Salvadi
- Nitya Shetty

== Production ==
This was the second film that Ravi Teja played the lead in after Nee Kosam (1999). The film marks the directorial debut of Pramod Kumar, who previously worked as an actor in Chitikela Pandiri (1992) starring Chakrapani Ananda. Rakesh Master choreographed the song "Vendi Theraku Maa Vandanalu".

== Music ==
The soundtrack was composed by Satya and were released under the Aditya Music audio label.

No.	Title	Lyrics	Singer(s)	Length
1.	"Chik Chik Chik Thana"	Shiva Ganesh	S. P. Balasubrahmanyam, Swarnalatha	3:34
2.	"Rammaina Jinnaina"	Mohan Rishi	Mano, S. P. Sailaja	4:54
3.	"Yentha Vintha Prema"	Shiva Ganesh	Swarnalatha, S. P. Balasubrahmanyam	4:52
4.	"Mama Miya Mama"	Y. N. Murthy	Poornima, Mano	3:59
5.	"Vendi Theraku Maa Vandanalu"	A. Sriman Kumar	Mano, Harini	4:54
Total length:				22:13

== Box office ==
The film was a box office failure.
