= Tirumala Tirupati Venkatesa =

- Directed by: E. Sathibabu
- Written by: Pinapaka Krishna Prasad (Dialogues)
- Screenplay by: E. V. V. Satyanarayana
- Story by: Rama Narayanan
- Based on: Thirupathi Ezhumalai Venkatesa (Tamil)
- Produced by: Chanti Addala; Sreenivasa Reddy
- Starring: Srikanth; Ravi Teja; Bramhanandam; Roja; Maheswari; Kovai Sarala; Aanand Vardhan
- Music by: Vandemataram Srinivas
- Production company: Friendly Movies
- Release date: 21 December 2000
- Running time: 146 minutes
- Country: India
- Language: Telugu

Tirumala Tirupati Venkatesa is a 2000 Indian Telugu-language comedy film directed by E. Sathibabu, an assistant to E. V. V. Satyanarayana. The film is a remake of the Tamil film Thirupathi Ezhumalai Venkatesa (1999) and stars Srikanth, Ravi Teja, Bramhanandam, Roja, Maheswari and Kovai Sarala. The film was produced by Chanti Addala and Sreenivasa Reddy and released on 21 December 2000. The original story itself is based on Shakespeare's play Taming of the Shrew.

== Plot ==
Tirumala, Tirupati and Venkatesa are poor friends who want to become rich at any cost. Kota, a bungalow watchman, has three daughters: Lalitha, Padmini and Ragini. When the owner left the bungalow on vacation, Kota's daughters move into the bungalow. Afterwards, Kota rents his owner's top portion bungalow to Tirumala, Tirupati and Venkatesa who lied about their job. The three men eventually marry the three women. The rest of the story is how the three men will manage their wives.

== Cast ==
- Srikanth as Venkatesa
- Ravi Teja as Tirupati
- Bramhanandam as Tirumala
- Roja as Ragini
- Maheswari as Padmini
- Kovai Sarala as Lalitha
- Kota Srinivasa Rao as Kota
- Chandra Mohan
- L. B. Sriram
- Tanikella Bharani
- M. S. Narayana
- Ananda Vardhan
- Prakash Raj as himself in the song "Paisa Paisa"

== Production ==
The film's pooja was held on 2 August 2000 at Ramanaidu Studios. Principal photography commenced on 15 September and ended on 30 October. A devotee of Lord Venkateswara filed a complaint about how the film's title demeaned the god. Chanti Addala, the film's producer organized a press meet where he talked about how the film was not a devotional film but solely a film for entertainment.

== Soundtrack ==
Music composed by Vandemataram Srinivas. The song "Paisa Paisa" was reused from "Aasai Aasai" from original Tamil film.

Track list
| No. | Title | Lyrics | Music | Artist(s) | Length |
|---|---|---|---|---|---|
| 1. | "Abbo Na Bandar Laddu" | Ghantala Krishna | Vandemataram Srinivas | Sukhwinder Singh, Swarnalatha, Sunitha Upadrashta | 4:16 |
| 2. | "Jhanak Jhanak" | Sankarambadi Sundarachari | Vandemataram Srinivas | Udit Narayan, Anuradha Paudwal | 4:55 |
| 3. | "One by Three" | Sankarambadi Sundarachari | Vandemataram Srinivas | S. P. Balasubrahmanyam | 4:54 |
| 4. | "Nadumu Ompulo" | Sankarambadi Sundarachari | Vandemataram Srinivas | Rajesh Krishnan, K. S. Chithra | 4:19 |
| 5. | "Paisa Paisa" | Ghantala Krishna | Vandemataram Srinivas | S. P. Balasubrahmanyam | 4:21 |

== Reception ==
A critic from Sify wrote, "The 400-year old Shakespeare's play Taming of the Shrew still inspires filmmakers and this time three shrews are tamed by their hubbies in Tirumala Tirupati Venkatesa. The first-half is truly hilarious while the second half is stretched a bit too far deserving a trimming". A critic from indiainfo.com wrote, "The only highlight of the movie is Brahmanandam's superb performance". Andhra Today wrote "A disjointed story lands the audience in confusion. With Brahmanandam and Kovai Sarala, even the expected humor appears missing in the movie only to disappoint the audience. The star cast too seem unjustified in playing such ill-conceived roles. The movie on the whole leaves much to be desired". Telugu Cinema wrote "In order to make the film out and out comedy which succeeded in generating laughter to some extent the director made the whole film too hollow which lacks seriousness even when needed and leaves no impression. Technically and musically it’s so so".
