= Pavitra Prema =

1998 Telugu film by Muthyala Subbaiah

- Movie Poster
- Directed by: Muthyala Subbaiah
- Written by: Sainath Thotapalli (story / dialogues)
- Screenplay by: Muthyala Subbaiah
- Produced by: V. Srinivasa Reddy
- Starring: Nandamuri Balakrishna; Laila; Roshini
- Cinematography: V. Srinivasa Reddy
- Edited by: V. Nagi Reddy
- Music by: Koti
- Production company: Srinivasa Arts
- Release date: 4 June 1998
- Running time: 150 minutes
- Country: India
- Language: Telugu

Pavitra Prema (transl. Holy love) is a 1998 Indian Telugu film directed by Muthyala Subbaiah. The film stars Nandamuri Balakrishna, Laila, Roshini with music composed by Koti. The film was produced by V. Srinivasa Reddy under Srinivasa Productions. The film was a box office success.

== Cast ==
- Nandamuri Balakrishna as Manikyam
- Laila as Dr. Shakuntala Devi
- Roshini as Rani
- Kota Srinivasa Rao as Ganta Rattaiah
- Sudhakar as Katari
- Ali as Simhadri
- Mallikarjuna Rao as Shani
- Ponnambalam as M. L. A. Rayudu
- Mohan Raj as Narsingh
- Narra Venkateswara Rao as Pulihora Papaiah
- M. S. Narayana as Compounder Narayana
- Venu Madhav as Koyadora
- P. J. Sarma as Commissioner Rajinikanth Rao
- Suthivelu as Watchman
- Chitti Babu as Cook
- Raja Ravindra as Ravi
- Tirupathi Prakash as Cook
- Annapurna as Annapurnamma
- Suma as Swapna
- Raksha as Bijili
- Aarathi

== Soundtrack ==
The music for the film was composed by Koti and released on Supreme Music Company.

Track listing
No.	Title	Lyrics	Singer(s)	Length
1.	"Jinguchakka Jingangu"	Bhuvanachandra	S. P. Balasubrahmanyam, Chitra	4:37
2.	"Gugumma Gugumma"	Sirivennela Sitarama Sastry	S. P. Balasubrahmanyam, Chitra, Poornima	4:31
3.	"Chaitrama Raa Raa"	Sirivennela Sitarama Sastry	S. P. Balasubrahmanyam, Chitra	4:30
4.	"O Ranga Sriranga"	Bhuvanachandra	S. P. Balasubrahmanyam, Sujatha	4:53
5.	"Divaala Deevana"	Gurucharan	S. P. Balasubrahmanyam, Swarnalatha	5:18
6.	"Chinukule Okkatai"	Sirivennela Sitarama Sastry	S. P. Balasubrahmanyam	4:30
7.	"O Daivama"	Sirivennela Sitarama Sastry	K. J. Yesudas	3:58
Total length:				32:17

== Reception ==
A critic from Andhra Today wrote, "'Pavithra Prema, with its much worn out theme, disappoints the audience to no end. `Pavithra prema' (sacred love) eludes the audience in the movie and the director has not made any attempts to enliven the dull theme".
