= Deyyam (1996 film) =

1996 Telugu horror film directed by Ram Gopal Varma

- Deyyam Movie Title
- Directed by: Ram Gopal Varma
- Written by: Ram Gopal Varma
- Produced by: Ram Gopal Varma
- Starring: J. D. Chakravarthy; Maheswari; Jayasudha; Ajinkya Deo
- Narrated by: Ganapathi Rao Kommanapalli (Dialogues)
- Cinematography: Chota K. Naidu
- Edited by: Bhanodaya
- Music by: Songs: Viswanatha Satyanarayana; Background Score: Mani Sharma
- Distributed by: Varma Corporation
- Release date: 21 June 1996
- Running time: 96 minutes
- Country: India
- Language: Telugu

Deyyam (English: Ghost) is a 1996 Telugu horror film written, produced, and directed by Ram Gopal Varma. The film stars J. D. Chakravarthy, Maheswari, Jayasudha, and Ajinkya Deo. The film released on 21 June 1996. It is based on the Hollywood film Poltergeist.

== Plot ==
Late at night, a man returns home. He passes by a graveyard and tries to interact with a ghost that he has mistaken for a woman and follows her. The ghost ambushes and kills him.

The story then moves to a happy couple Murali and Sindhu, who live with their three-year-old son Chinni and Sindhu's sister Mahi. They plan to buy a strange new farmhouse, which is near the same graveyard shown during the beginning of the movie. Mahi is in love with her boyfriend Narsing, and they often hang out together. Problems start to rise when Chinni starts making imaginary friends in their new home. It is later revealed that his "imaginary friends" are ghosts. A sequence of events happen proving the presence of ghosts in the house. Things grow worse when Chinni becomes prey to the ghosts and is killed under mysterious circumstances. Sindhu sees Chinni's ghost and feels that he is still alive. Sindhu gets mentally upset and starts to look for Chinni everywhere around the house.

Meanwhile, Narsing, once while waiting for Mahi near their house by the graveyard one night, comes across the same ghost (seen during the beginning of the movie) and mistakes it for Mahi, and the ghost tries to attack him. He somehow escapes from there. Later, after inquiring with his friends, they tell him that a builder built the farm house on top of a graveyard and there are a lot of rumors in circulation that the place has a demonic presence. Narsing understands that Mahi's family is in serious trouble. He warns Mahi to move away from that house immediately, repeatedly. But Mahi, raised as an atheist, does not pay heed to his words. The ghosts continue to haunt and kill the family members one after the other. The story comes to the climax, where it is revealed that the entire area around the farmhouse is infested with ghosts. The undead rise from their graves, and it boils down to Mahi and Narsing remaining (everyone including Mahi's family joins the undead). They manage to flee from the farmhouse and return to Narsing's house. To their horror, they find the ghosts of Mahi's family and other known people around the farmhouse waiting for them. The final scene shows that they are cornered by the ghosts and surrounded. The film concluded with an uncertain ending as to whether they escape and survive or not.

== Cast ==
- J. D. Chakravarthy as Narsing, Mahi's boyfriend
- Maheswari as Mahi, Sindhu's younger sister
- Jayasudha as Sindhumathi "Sindhu"
- Ajinkya Deo as Murali, Sindhu's husband
- Master Ravichandra Padmala as Chinni, Sindhu's son
- Tanikella Bharani as Psychologist
- Jeeva as Madman
- Ramjagan as the man who was killed by the ghost
- Ahuti Prasad
- Banerjee
- Ananth Babu
- Kallu Chidambaram

== Track listing ==
No.	Title	Singer	Length	Lyricist
1	"Alli Billi Kurra Cheera"	Mano	05:59	
2	"Deyyam Pilupu"	Instrumental	06:00	
3	"Ee Kulasaala Gulabi"	Mano	04:44	
4	"Hello Hello O Missu"	Mano	04:27	
5	"O Jaabili"	K. S. Chithra	05:33	

== Reception ==
A critic from Andhra Today wrote that "They are very few good horror movies in Telugu. Ram Gopal Varma's -Deyyam is one such movie". Though the movie didn't fare well at box office, over period it has attained cult status.

== See also ==
- Deyyam, a 2021 Telugu horror film, also directed by Ram Gopal Varma
