= Priyaragalu =

- DVD cover
- Directed by: A. Kodandarami Reddy
- Written by: Diwakar Babu (dialogues)
- Screenplay by: Yandamuri Veerendranath
- Story by: Fazil (director)
- Based on: Pappayude Swantham Appoos
- Produced by: Sunkara Madhu Murali
- Starring: Jagapati Babu; Soundarya; Maheswari; Master Aanand Vardhan
- Cinematography: Hari Anumaalu
- Edited by: A. Sreekar Prasad
- Music by: M. M. Keeravani
- Production company: Melody Theaters
- Release date: 21 October 1997
- Running time: 138 minutes
- Country: India
- Language: Telugu

Priyaragalu is 1997 Telugu-language romantic musical film, produced by Sunkara Madhu Murali under the Melody Theaters banner and directed by A. Kodandarami Reddy. It stars Jagapati Babu, Soundarya, Maheswari, Master Anand Vardhan and has music composed by M. M. Keeravani. The film is a remake of Malayalam film, Pappayude Swantham Appoos and won two Nandi Awards.

== Cast ==
- Jagapati Babu as Madhu
- Soundarya as Priya
- Maheswari as Sneha
- Master Aanand Vardhan as Kushulu alias Kusha Lav
- Benarjee as Banerjee
- Kota Srinivasa Rao as Manager
- Brahmanandam as Anandam
- Tanikella Bharani as Doctor
- A.V.S. as Gopalam
- Venu Madhav
- Kolla Ashok Kumar as Gopalam's House Owner
- Yandamuri Veerendranath as Director
- Kishore Rathi as Doctor
- Chitti Babu as Chandra
- Ananth Babu as Ananth
- Gundu Hanumantha Rao as Priest
- Jenny
- Rajitha as Anandam's wife
- Anitha Chowdary as Anchor
- Baby Nitya as Chintu

== Soundtrack ==
The music was composed by M. M. Keeravani. The music was released on T-Series Music Company.

No.	Title	Lyrics	Singer(s)	Length
1.	"Chinna Chiru Chiru (F)"	Sirivennela Sitarama Sastry	K. S. Chithra	4:36
2.	"Chinuku Tadi"	Sirivennela Sitarama Sastry	Hariharan, K. S. Chithra	6:03
3.	"Koonalamma Koonalamma"	Sirivennela Sitarama Sastry	S. P. Balu, K. S. Chithra	4:51
4.	"Priya Vasanta Geetama"	Sirivennela Sitarama Sastry	M. M. Keeravani, K. S. Chithra	4:21
5.	"Raayabaaram Pampindevare"	M. M. Keeravani	S. P. Balu, K. S. Chithra	5:10
6.	"Chinna Chiru Chiru (M)"	Sirivennela Sitarama Sastry	S. P. Balu	4:36
Total length:				29:37

== Reception ==
A critic from Andhra Today opined that "On the whole a good movie, which could have avoided being marred by the plagiarism of comic scenes from a recent popular movie".

== Awards ==
Nandi Awards – 1997

- Best Child Actor – Master Aanand Vardhan
- Best Male Playback Singer – S. P. Balasubrahmanyam – "Chinna"
