= Mrugam =

- Directed by: Rudraraju Suresh Varma
- Produced by: D. Prabhakar
- Starring: J. D. Chakravarthy; Maheswari
- Cinematography: Chota K. Naidu
- Music by: Raj
- Release date: 12 April 1996
- Country: India
- Language: Telugu

Mrugam (English: Beast) is a 1996 Indian Telugu-language crime film written and directed by Rudraraju Suresh Varma and starring J. D. Chakravarthy and Maheswari.

== Plot ==
The plot revolves around a politician criminal nexus and love drama.

== Cast ==
- J. D. Chakravarthy
- Maheswari
- Jeeva
- Chalapati Rao
- Ranganath
- Gundu Hanumantha Rao
- Delhi Rajeshwari
- Ramaraju
- Bandla Ganesh

== Production ==
On 14 November 1995, stunt master Thyagarajan was stabbed in Hyderabad while the shooting of this film was underway by film workers on strike sparking protests about the safety of actors travelling from Madras to Hyderabad.

== Soundtrack ==
The soundtrack was composed by Raj and all lyrics were written by Sirivennela Seetharama Sastry.

Track list
No.	Title	Singer(s)	Length
1.	"Chal Chal Chali"	Nagoor Babu, Anupama	5:15
2.	"Eeduki Jathoste"	S. P. Balasubrahmanyam	4:30
3.	"Tiyyaga Ragaale Teeyaga"	Sri Ram, Anuradha Sriram	4:31
4.	"Mabbullo Nelavanka"	Nagoor Babu, Srilekha	3:45
5.	"Dole Dole"	Sri Ram, Anuradha Sriram	5:11
Total length:			23:13
