= Aanand Vardhan =

Indian actor

- Born: Hyderabad, Telangana, India
- Other name: Aanand Vardhan
- Occupation: Actor
- Years active: 1996–2004; 2023–present
- Relatives: P. B. Sreenivas

Aanand Vardhan is an Indian actor who appears in Telugu films. He is the grandson of noted playback singer P. B. Srinivas. He appeared in more than twenty films as a child actor before debuting in a lead role with Nidurinchu Jahapana (2025).

== Early life and education ==
Vardhan was born in Hyderabad, Telangana, India. His grandfather is Telugu playback singer P. B. Srinivas. His father is a chartered accountant. His father used to frequently tell him stories from Ramayana, so he learnt them by heart, and coincidentally started his child artist career with a role in Ramayanam. His grandfather also wanted to see him as an actor.

He graduated with Bachelor of Technology degree in Computer Science & Engineering from CMR College of Engineering & Technology, Hyderabad, Telangana, India in 2012.

== Career ==
He was 4 years old when he acted in the film Ramayanam. He played the roles of Valmiki and Bala Hanuman.

He made his feature film debut as a child actor in Priyaragalu starring Jagapathi Babu and Soundarya. He played significant roles in the hit films Suryavamsam, Preminchukundam Raa and Manasantha Nuvve. He acted with Jagapati Babu, Venkatesh and Nandamuri Balakrishna. He also acted with Amitabh Bachchan in the Hindi remake of Suryavamsam.

== Filmography ==
Year	Title	Role	Language	Notes	Ref.
1997	Priyaragalu	Kushulu alias Kusha Lav	Telugu		
1997	Ramayanam	Valmiki & Hanuman	Telugu		
1997	Preminchukundam Raa	Chinnu	Telugu		
1997	Pelli Pandiri	Young Prakash	Telugu	|	
1998	Suryavamsam	Junior Harichandra Prasad	Telugu		
1998	Maavidaakulu	Cable	Telugu		
1998	Pelli Peetalu	Babloo	Telugu		
1999	Sooryavansham	Chhote Thakur Bhanupratap Singh a.k.a. Sonu	Hindi		
1999	Preyasi Rave	Nani	Telugu		
2000	Tirumala Tirupati Venkatesa	Mrugaraju	Telugu		
2001	Sri Manjunatha	Anandavardhan	Kannada		
2001	Manasantha Nuvve	Young Chanti	Telugu		
2002	Indra	Indra's nephew	Telugu		
2003	Toli Choopulone		Telugu		
2004	Nenunnanu	Young Venu	Telugu		
2025	Nidurinchu Jahapana	Veeru	Telugu	Debut in a lead role	

== Awards ==
- 1997: Nandi Award for Best Child Actor – Priyaragalu
