= Roshini (actress) =

Indian actress

- Born: Radhika Sadanah
- Other name: Roshini
- Occupation: Actress
- Years active: 1997–1998
- Relatives: Jyothika (sister); Nagma (half-sister); Suriya (brother-in-law)

Radhika Sadanah, better known by her stage name Roshini, is an Indian former actress who worked in the Telugu, Tamil, and Kannada film industries from 1997 to 1998. She is the sister of actress Jyothika and half-sister of Nagma.

== Career ==
After getting a recommendation by Nagma, Roshini made her acting debut in Selva's comedy film Sishya, where she played the lead role alongside Karthik. She subsequently starred in Master (1997), opposite Chiranjeevi.

Roshini was keen to accept performance-orientated roles and turned down several offers in late 1997 to be a part of films in glamorous roles. She subsequently worked on K. Balachander's production Thulli Thirintha Kaalam (1998), opposite Arunkumar, after actress Manthra turned the film down. The film and her performance won mixed reviews and performed moderately at the box office. However, thereafter, her ongoing films such as Puli Pirandha Mann, opposite Napoleon, became stuck and she later quit the film industry.

== Personal life ==
Roshini is the younger sister of actress Nagma and older sister of actress Jyothika.

== Filmography ==
Year	Title	Role	Language
1997	Sishya	Shruthi / Anu	Tamil
1997	Master	Preethi	Telugu
1998	Gulabi	Renjini	Kannada
1998	Pavitra Prema	Rani	Telugu
1998	Subhalekhalu	Priya	Telugu
1998	Thulli Thirintha Kaalam	Devi	Tamil
