= List of Telugu films of 1995 =

This is a list of films produced by the Tollywood (Telugu language film industry) based in Hyderabad in the year 1995.

== List of released films ==
Title	Director	Cast	Music director	Sources
Aadaalla Majaka	Muthyala Subbaiah	Vikram, Sivaranjani		
Aayanaki Iddaru	E. V. V. Satyanarayana	Jagapati Babu, Ramya Krishna, Sivaranjani		
Adavi Dora	K. Sadasivarao	Sobhan Babu, Nagma		
Alluda Majaka	E. V. V. Satyanarayana	Chiranjeevi, Ramya Krishnan, Rambha, Lakshmi	Koti	
Amma Donga	Sagar	Krishna, Soundarya, Aamani, Indraja	Raj–Koti	
Ammoru	Kodi Ramakrishna	Suresh, Soundarya, Ramya Krishna, Baby Sunaina, Rami Reddy, Vadivukkarasi	Sri	
Anaganaga Oka Roju	Ram Gopal Varma	J. D. Chakravarthy, Urmila Matondkar	Sri Kommineni	
Aunty	Mouli	Jayasudha, Nassar, Anand		
Ayanaku Iddaru	E. V. V. Satyanarayana	Jagapathi Babu, Ooha, Ramya Krishna, Brahmanandam	Koti	
Bhale Bullodu	Sarath Babu	Jagapathi Babu, Soundarya		
Big Boss	Vijaya Bapineedu	Chiranjeevi, Roja Selvamani, Kota Srinivasa Rao, Madhavi	Raj–Koti	
Chilakapachcha Kaapuram	Kodi Ramakrishna	Jagapathi Babu, Meena, Soundarya		
Ghatotkachudu	S. V. Krishna Reddy	Satyanarayana Kaikala, Roja Selvamani, Ali	S. V. Krishna Reddy	
Gharana Bullodu	K. Raghavendra Rao	Nagarjuna, Ramya Krishna, Aamani	M. M. Keeravani	
God Father	Kodi Ramakrishna	Vinod Kumar, Vani Viswanath, Kasthuri		
Ketu Duplicate	Relangi Narasimha Rao	Rajendra Prasad, Surabhi, Brahmanandam, Satyanarayana Kaikala	Koti	
Lingababu Love Story	Vamsy	Rajendra Prasad, Rajasri		
Maato Pettukoku	A. Kodandarami Reddy	Nandamuri Balakrishna, Rambha, Roja Selvamani	Madhavapeddi Suresh	
Maya Bazaar	Dasari Narayana Rao	ANR, Suman, Aamani		
Money Money	Shiva Nageswara Rao	Jagapathi Babu, Urmila Matondkar, J. D. Chakravarthy, Jayasudha	K. Srinivas	
Mounam	C. Umamaheshwara Rao	Arvind Swamy, Nagma, Charu Haasan		
Nirantharam		Raghubir Yadav		
Orey Rikshaw	Dasari Narayana Rao	R. Narayana Murthy	Vandemataram Srinivas	
Pedarayudu	Raviraja Pinisetty	Mohan Babu, Rajinikanth, Soundarya, Bhanupriya, Brahmanandam	Koti	
Pelli Sandadi	K. Raghavendra Rao	Srikanth, Ravali, Deepti Bhatnagar	M. M. Keeravani	
Pokiri Raja	A. Kodandarami Reddy	Daggubati Venkatesh, Roja Selvamani		
Raja Simham		Rajasekhar, Ramya Krishna, Soundarya		
Rambantu	Bapu	Rajendra Prasad, Eswari Rao	M. M. Keeravani	
Rikshavodu	Kodi Ramakrishna	Chiranjeevi, Naghma, Soundarya, Jayasudha	Raj–Koti	
Sankalpam	A. M. Rathnam	Jagapati Babu, Gautami		
Sisindri	Shiva Nageswara Rao	Nagarjuna, Tabu, Amala, Aamani, Akhil	Raj	
Sogasu Chuda Taramaa?	Gunasekhar	Naresh, Indraja, Tanikella Bharani	Bharadwaj	
Stri	K. S. Sethumadhavan	Rohini		
Subha Sankalpam	K. Vishwanath	Kamal Haasan, Aamani, Priya Raman	M. M. Keeravani	
Subhamastu	Bhimaneni Srinivasa Rao	Jagapati Babu, Aamani, Indraja		
Taj Mahal	Muppulaleni Siva	Srikanth, Monica Bedi	M. M. Sreelekha	
Vajram	S. V. Krishna Reddy	Nagarjuna, Roja, Indraja		
