= Maheswari =

Indian actress

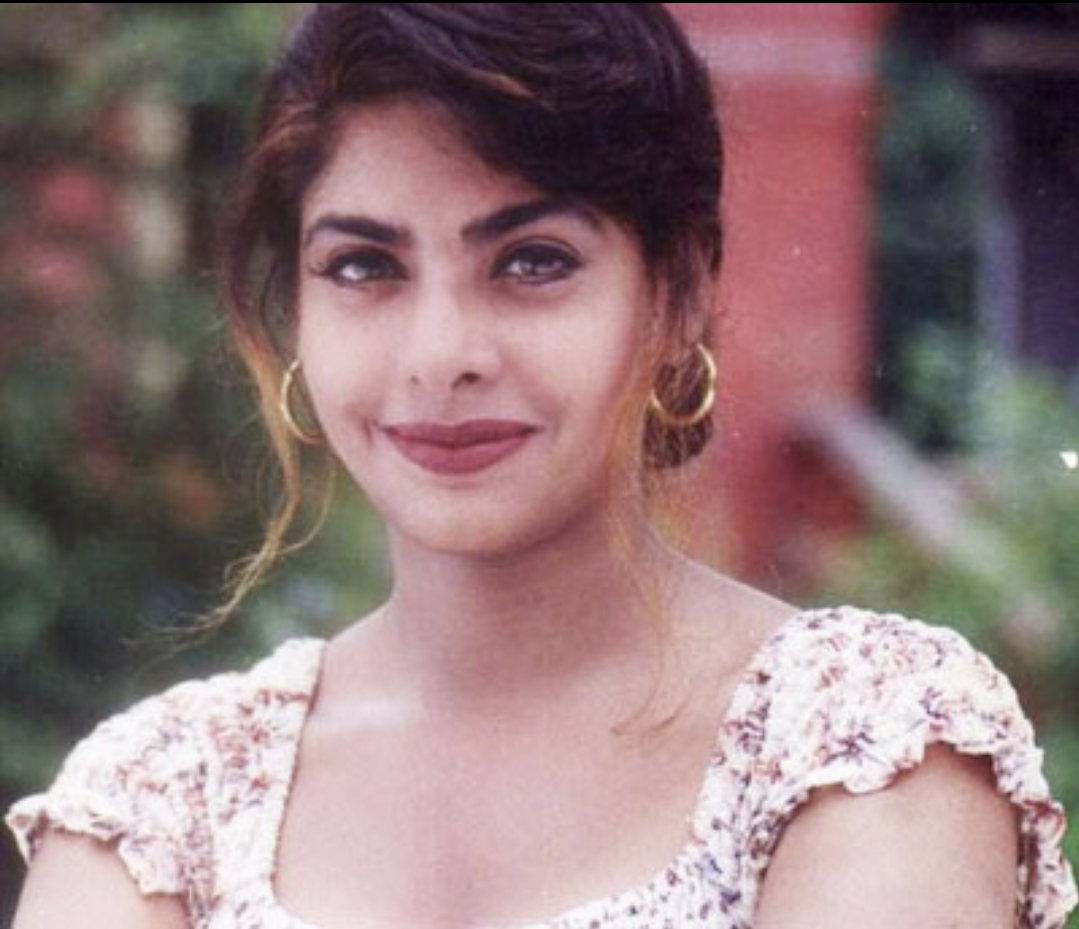
- Maheswari for a film shoot
- Born: 26 August 1977 (age 49); Chennai, Tamil Nadu, India
- Occupations: Actress; fashion designer
- Years active: 1994-2000 (films); 2010-2014 (television)
- Spouse: Jayakrishna (m. 2008)
- Relatives: Sridevi (maternal aunt ) Avishek Karthik (brother)

Maheswari is an Indian former actress, who appeared predominantly in Telugu and Tamil language films. She was one of the leading actresses in Telugu and Tamil films from 1994 to 2000. She appeared alongside major South Indian stars like Jagapati Babu, J. D. Chakravarthy, Ravi Teja, Ajith Kumar, Chiyaan Vikram, Prabhu, Arjun Sarja, Prabhu Deva, and Shiva Rajkumar. She is best known for her performances in Pelli (1997), Gulabi (1995), Karuththamma (1994), and Ullaasam (1997).

== Personal life ==
Maheswari was born to Mohan Reddy, who hails from Tirupati, and Suryakala Yalamanchili, who is from a Telugu speaking community in Sivakasi, Tamil Nadu. She married an engineer, Jayakrishna, in 2008 in an arranged marriage. Jayakrishna is from a Telugu speaking family in Guntur, and is based in Hyderabad. He is the owner and the managing director of a payment software company in Hyderabad.

== Career ==
Maheswari started her film career at the age of 17 in year 1994 through the Tamil film, Karuththamma directed by Bharathiraja and the movie was successful at box office and the song 'Thenmerku Paruva Kaatru' made her famous among Tamil audience. She became popular in Telugu with Gulabi in 1995. She played the lead role of Pooja opposite with actor J. D. Chakravarthy. After that she got many offers in movies. Maheswari's first Kannada film was the Annavra Makkalu. She did her first horror film, Deyyam in 1996 under the production and direction of Ram Gopal Varma. In this film, she was partnered again with actor, J. D. Chakravarthy and also in 1996 Telugu crime film, Mrugam. She starring with Ajith Kumar in the Tamil films, Nesam and Ullaasam. She also did the Telugu films Pelli and Priyaragalu Maheswari did few more Tamil and Telugu films including the Maa Balaji (1999). She was also in the lead role in the multi-award-winning film, Nee Kosam. Maheswari made an elegant performance and succeeded as a heroine for almost 10 years in Telugu and Tamil industry. After appearing in Tirumala Tirupati Venkatesa (2000), she quit the film industry at the peak of her career in 2000. She married Jayakrishna a software engineer at Tirupati in 2008.

She has since appeared in television for serials after her marriage. In 2010, Maheswari appeared in the serial, Soundaravalli. Then, she featured in the comedy serial, “My Name is Manga Tayaru” (Telugu) and “My Name Is Mangamma” (Tamil) in 2012 on Zee TV which was a super hit among households. She has also featured in the serial Adhey Kangal in 2014 which aired on Jaya TV.

She is currently pursuing an alternate career as a fashion designer and recently opened a store and launched her new label ‘Mahe Ayyapan’ in Hyderabad inaugurated by her aunt Sridevi.

== Filmography ==
Year	Film	Role	Language	Notes
1994	Karuththamma	Rosy	Tamil	
1994	Ammayi Kapuram	Aruna	Telugu	
1995	Gulabi	Pooja	Telugu	Nominated-Filmfare Award for Best Actress – Telugu
1995	Khaidi Inspector	Bhargavi	Telugu	
1995	Annavra Makkalu	Pooja	Kannada	
1996	Deyyam	Mahi	Telugu	
1996	Mrugam		Telugu	
1996	Veerudu		Telugu	
1996	Jabilamma Pelli	Jyothi	Telugu	
1996	Panchalankurichi	Alamu	Tamil	
1997	Nesam	Madhu	Tamil	
1997	Ullaasam	Megha	Tamil	
1997	Pelli	Maheswari	Telugu	Nominated-Filmfare Award for Best Actress – Telugu
1997	Priyaragalu	Sneha	Telugu	
1998	Navvulata	Chandana	Telugu	
1998	Naam Iruvar Nammaku Iruvar	Pooja	Tamil	
1998	Rathna	Mala	Tamil	
1998	O Panaipothundi Babu		Telugu	
1998	En Uyir Nee Thaane	Seema	Tamil	
1999	Mannavaru Chinnavaru	Shweta	Tamil	partially reshot version of Subhavartha
1999	Maa Balaji	Pooja	Telugu	
1999	Suyamvaram	Aishwarya	Tamil	
1999	Preminchedi Endukamma	Swapna	Telugu	
1999	Ramasakkanodu	Meenakshi	Telugu	
1999	Velugu Needalu		Telugu	
1999	Nee Kosam	Sasirekha	Telugu	Winner, Nandi Award for Best Actress; Nominated-Filmfare Award for Best Actress – Telugu
2000	Athey Manithan	Bhavani	Tamil	
2000	Balaram	Madhulatha	Telugu	
2000	Maa Annayya	Nandini	Telugu	
2000	Nagulamma	Nagulamma	Telugu	
2000	Tirumala Tirupati Venkatesa	Padmini	Telugu	

== Television ==
Year	Title	Role	Channel	Language
2008–2009	My Name is Manga Tayaru	Manga Tayaru	Zee Telugu	Telugu
2010	Soundaravalli	Mahalakshmi	Jaya TV	Tamil
2012–2013	My Name Is Mangamma	Mangamma	Zee Tamil	Tamil
2014	Adhey Kangal	Uma	Jaya TV	Tamil
2022	Sridevi Drama Company	Judge	ETV	Telugu
2023	Start Music Season 4	Participant	Star Vijay	Tamil

== Awards ==
- Nandi Award for Best Actress – Nee Kosam (1999)
