= S/O Satyamurthy =

2015 film by Trivikram Srinivas

- Theatrical release poster
- Directed by: Trivikram Srinivas
- Written by: Trivikram Srinivas
- Produced by: S. Radha Krishna
- Starring: Allu Arjun; Upendra; Samantha; Nithya Menen; Sneha; Adah Sharma
- Cinematography: Chota K. Naidu
- Edited by: Prawin Pudi
- Music by: Devi Sri Prasad
- Production company: Haarika & Hassine Creations
- Distributed by: Classic Entertainments (overseas); Sri Venkateswara Creations (Nizam)
- Release date: 9 April 2015
- Running time: 163 minutes
- Country: India
- Language: Telugu
- Budget: ₹40 crore
- Box office: est.₹90.5 crore

S/O Satyamurthy is a 2015 Indian Telugu language action comedy film written and directed by Trivikram Srinivas and produced by S. Radha Krishna under Haarika & Haasine Creations. The film stars an ensemble cast consisting of Allu Arjun, Upendra, Samantha, Prakash Raj, Nithya Menen, Sneha, and Adah Sharma while Rajendra Prasad, Sampath Raj, Rao Ramesh, Vennela Kishore, Ali, and Brahmanandam play supporting role.

The film revolves around three characters; the first follows his heart, the second uses his brain and the third uses his brawn. The first is Viraj Anand, the son of a businessman named Satyamurthy, who gives away his assets to creditors after his father's death. A creditor still owed money is Paida Sambasiva Rao (the second of the three), whose daughter Sameera falls in love with Anand. Sambasiva Rao informs Anand that he has to produce documentation of land sold by Satyamurthy to a landlord, Devaraj Naidu (the third of the three) to marry Sameera. The rest of the film focuses on the consequences faced by Anand and Sambasiva Rao's change in viewpoint toward Satyamurthy.

In addition to directing the film, Srinivas wrote its screenplay. Initially planned as a multilingual film shot in Telugu, Malayalam, and Tamil the producers filmed in Telugu and dubbed it into Malayalam with the same title. Devi Sri Prasad composed the score and Chota K Naidu was its cinematographer. Production began on 10 April 2014 at Ramanaidu Studios in Hyderabad. Principal photography began on 22 September 2014 in Hyderabad, lasting until mid-March 2015. Except for three songs filmed in Europe, the rest of the film was shot in and around Hyderabad.

The Telugu version was released worldwide on 1375 screens on 9 April 2015, and the Malayalam version was released on 24 April 2015. On a ₹40 crore (US$6.24 million) budget, S/O Satyamurthy earned a distributor share of ₹51.9 crore (US$8.09 million) and grossed ₹90.5 crore (US$14.11 million). (Note: The average exchange rate in 2015 was 64.15 Indian rupees (₹) per 1 US dollar (US$).) The film was an above-average grosser based on the return on the distributors' investment of ₹54 crore (US$8.42 million). With this film, Allu Arjun became the first Telugu actor with two consecutive films earning more than ₹50 crore share worldwide.

== Plot ==
Viraj Anand is the son of Sathyamurthy, a deeply principled businessman who dies in a sudden road accident. Anand inherits assets worth ₹300 crores, but also learns that his father left behind an equivalent amount of debts. Paida Sambasiva Rao, one of Sathyamurthy's friends, advises Anand to file for corporate bankruptcy to safeguard his personal wealth. Guided by a commitment to preserve his father's reputation, Anand refuses and surrenders all family assets to clear the liabilities. The sudden reversal of fortune causes Anand's elder brother to mentally breakdown, while his fiancee, Pallavi, breaks off their engagement. Becoming the sole breadwinner, Anand takes a job as a wedding planner at an event management company run by his friend Bhadram, accompanied by his loyal assistant Param.

Anand is assigned to coordinate a destination wedding in Ooty, which turns out to be Pallavi's. There, he meets her friend Sameera, and the two eventually fall in love. During the celebrations, Anand foils a plot by Pallavi's uncle to ruin the wedding and helps her family reconcile. In gratitude, Pallavi’s father pays Anand double his fee, temporarily easing his financial strain.

Sameera is revealed to be the daughter of Sambasiva Rao, who adamantly opposes her relationship with Anand. Sambasiva Rao accuses Satyamurthy of defrauding him by selling an 8,000-square-foot property that was illegally seized by a feared land mafia lord, Devaraj Naidu. Furious at the allegation, Anand challenges Sambasiva Rao, promising to deliver the original land deeds within four weeks; in return, Sambasiva Rao must publicly apologize and consent to his wedding with Sameera.

Bhadram devises a scheme to swap the original land deeds with counterfeits using the help of Devaraj's relative. However, Anand and Param mistakenly enter Devaraj's mansion, where they reveal their intentions directly to Devaraj. Before Devaraj can execute them, his wife Lakshmi, who is unaware of his violent nature, intervenes. Forced to spare their lives, he instead commands his henchmen to kidnap Sambasiva Rao's family and bring them to his mansion.

The following day, Anand rescues Devaraj from an assassination attempt by the brother of his rival, Veeraswamy Naidu. Grateful, Devaraj agrees to return the land deeds on the condition that Anand marry his sister, Valli, much to Sambasiva Rao's delight. However, Valli secretly loves Lakshmi's brother, Vinay, and threatens Anand to cancel their impending marriage. To derail the wedding, Anand manipulates Devaraj's brother-in-law Koda Rambabu, who mistakes Param for the groom, into making a deal with Veeraswamy to let assassins enter their mansion. Anand intends for the disruption to allow Vinay and Valli to escape. However, Veeraswamy's men mistake Vinay for the groom and attack him, prompting Devaraj and Anand to defend him. When one of the attackers exposes Koda Rambabu's betrayal, Devaraj moves to kill him, but Anand steps in and confesses to masterminding the ploy to stop the forced marriage.

Enraged, Devaraj attacks Anand but halts after Anand's mother arrives at the venue, revealing that Sathyamurthy died while rescuing Valli from a fatal crash orchestrated by Veeraswamy. Even on his deathbed, Sathyamurthy had attempted to resolve Sambasiva Rao's land paperwork, dying before he could complete it. Overcome with remorse, Sambasiva Rao realizes the depth of Sathyamurthy's integrity. Devaraj willingly surrenders the land documents to Anand, who hands them over to Sambasiva Rao seconds before his four-week deadline expires. Sambasiva Rao apologizes for his prejudice, and Sameera reunites with Anand. Meanwhile, Veerasamy dies in a road accident caused by a warning sign Anand had erected earlier, and Koda Rambabu is forgiven.

As Anand and Sambasiva Rao travel home with their families, Pallavi's father intercepts them with news that the market value of Anand's previously liquidated stock has surged, recovering a substantial portion of his father's lost fortune. An emotional Anand expresses his gratitude to his late father at the site where he died. Reclaiming their ancestral home, Anand and his family rebuild their lives as Sambasiva Rao begins preparations for Anand and Sameera's wedding.

== Cast ==
- Allu Arjun as Viraj Anand
- Upendra as Devaraj Naidu (voice dubbed by P. Ravi Shankar)
- Samantha as Sameera/Subbalakshmi, Viraj’s love interest & Paida Sambasiva Rao’s daughter
- Nithya Menen as Valli, Devaraj's sister
- Sneha as Lakshmi, Devaraj's wife
- Adah Sharma as Kolasani Pallavi, Anand's former fiancée
- Prakash Raj as Satyamoorthy, Anand’s father (extended cameo appearance)
- Rajendra Prasad as Paida Sambhashiva Rao, Sameera's father
- Pavithra Lokesh as Sharada, Anand's mother
- Rao Ramesh as Pallavi's father
- Kota Srinivasa Rao as Devaraj's father
- Sindhu Tolani as Anand's sister-in-law
- Vennela Kishore as Anand's brother
- Ali as Paramdhamaiah a.k.a. Param
- Brahmanandam as Koda Rambabu, Devaraj's brother-in-law
- M. S. Narayana as Pallavi's uncle
- Sampath Raj as Veeraswamy Naidu, Devaraj's arch-rival
- Baby Vernika as Sweety, Anand's niece
- Mamilla Shailaja Priya as Sameera's mother
- Vamsi Krishna as Yogeshwar, Pallavi's husband
- Chaitanya Krishna as Vinay, Valli's love interest
- Ravi Prakash as Kumaraswamy Naidu, Veeraswamy's brother
- Sree Vishnu as Bhadram, Anand's friend
- Rajitha as Devaraj's elder sister and Koda Rammohan's wife
- Prabhu as Devaraj's brother-in-law
- Giridhar as Sameera's friend
- Surekha Vani as Sweety's school principal
- Jeeva as Lawyer
- Madhunandan as Company Manager
- Ananth Babu as Yogeshwar's uncle
- Gautam Raju as Police officer
- Satya as Thief
- Prabhas Sreenu as Goon
- Amit Tiwari as Pallavi's brother
- Jani Master (cameo)

== Production ==
=== Development ===
Trivikram Srinivas planned to direct Allu Arjun in a film produced by S. Radha Krishna under Haarika & Haasine Creations (who produced their 2012 collaboration Julai), since Srinivas had committed to another film with them. Allu Aravind was later rumoured to co-produce of the film as Geetha Arts. The film's pooja ceremony was held at Radha Krishna's office in early December 2013, and filming was expected to begin in February 2014. Rumors that the film was shelved were denied by a film-unit source, who said that Srinivas' screenplay was nearly complete. Devi Sri Prasad was chosen to compose the score and Prawin Pudi was signed as the film editor, marking Pudi's fifth collaboration with Srinivas. (Note: Prawin Pudi and Trivikram Srinivas collaborated for four films in the past : Jalsa (2008), Khaleja (2010), Julai (2012) and Attarintiki Daredi (2013).)

The film was officially launched at Ramanaidu Studios in Hyderabad on 10 April 2014. In June, the film's title was rumoured to be Kavacham. After considerable discussion, the producers reportedly tentatively planned to name the film Trisulam (also the title of a 1982 Telugu film starring Krishnam Raju and Sridevi). Agreements between the principals of both films were reportedly signed in early November 2014. Radhakrishna denied the reports, saying that the film's title would be announced in early December 2014 with its preview. Trivikram reportedly considered the title Hushaaru in mid-January 2015. Another title under consideration was Jaadugar, earlier used for a 1989 Hindi film starring Amitabh Bachchan and Jaya Prada.

The producers reportedly dropped the first two titles after poor feedback, and Jaadugar was expected to be chosen; S/O Krishnamurthy was also considered. S/O Satyamurthy (read as Son of Satyamurthy) was confirmed as the film's title on 6 March 2015 in a press release from the producers. The film was initially planned for simultaneous release in Telugu, Tamil and Malayalam. A dubbed Kannada version, along with Tamil and Malayalam, later was planned because of Upendra and Allu Arjun's popularity in Karnataka.

Although the dubbed Malayalam version was also entitled S/O Satyamurthy, the dubbed Tamil and Kannada versions were scrapped for fiscal reasons and it was released in Tamil Nadu and Karnataka with English subtitles. Arjun began dubbing his role in early January, and post-production was scheduled to resume in late February. The actor resumed dubbing on 7 March, after returning from Spain.

=== Casting ===
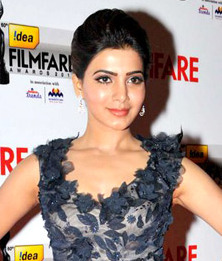
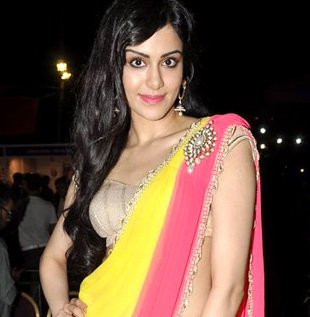
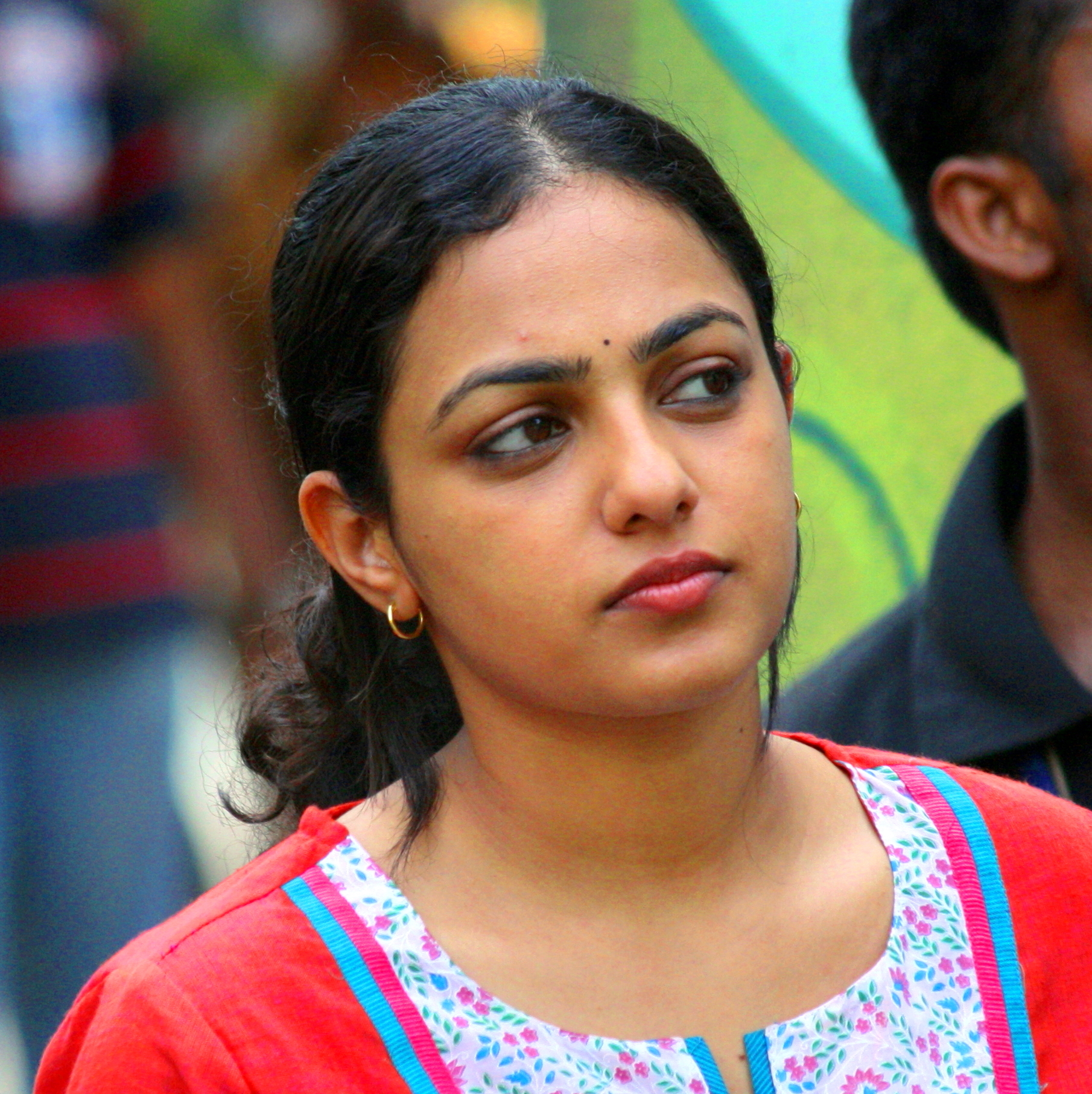
Samantha Ruth Prabhu (left), Adah Sharma (middle) and Nithya Menen (right) were signed for the female lead roles.

Allu Arjun was part of the project since its initial stages in early November 2013. Samantha Ruth Prabhu was cast as one of the film's heroines, her first collaboration with Arjun. S/O Satyamurthy has three female leads; although Arjun initially denied this, Srinivas confirmed that the film has three heroines. Kriti Sanon was rumoured to be one of the three female leads, although she later denied it. Adah Sharma and Pranitha Subhash were cast as the other two female leads, after Regina Cassandra, Nayantara and Rashi Khanna were considered for Subhash's role. Subhash was later replaced by Nithya Menen because of conceptual differences with Srinivas, although she later said that she never signed for the film and reports that she had walked out were rumours.

Rao Ramesh was cast in a crucial role. Although Arjun Sarja was reported to be the film's antagonist in mid-August 2014, Sarja later confirmed that he was not part of the project due to other commitments. Sneha confirmed in mid-September 2014 that she had an important role in the film. Upendra and Rajendra Prasad were said to play important roles in the film, and Upendra later confirmed his inclusion. Vennela Kishore and Surekha Vani were selected to play supporting roles. Kota Srinivasa Rao was cast at the end of November 2014, and Mamilla Shailaja Priya was cast in a supporting role.

Supporting character actor M. S. Narayana died after most of his portions in the film was completed. Although Srinivas decided not to delete any of his scenes, he faced a dilemma: whether to use a double or make do with what he had filmed. After evaluating many mimics, Srinivas and Arjun reportedly decided to use Siva Reddy to dub for Narayana's role. Sampath Raj was cast in early February 2015.

=== Characters ===
S/O Satyamurthy was considered an image makeover for Arjun. Although his character's name (Viraj Anand) was intended for another role in the film, he requested Srinivas to use the name for the titular character's son. Arjun learned flips, somersaults and other gymnastic skills to perform his stunts. He, his brother Allu Sirish and stylist Ashwin bought his costumes in Dubai, and he lost 10 kilograms (22 lb) with a customised diet and workout. Sneha was rumoured to play Arjun's sister-in-law.

Upendra was confirmed in a role paralleling Arjun's in the film, and Sharma reportedly wore a traditional attire to suit her role. Sharma's character was revealed to be unstable, while Arjun's character was nuanced; he was confirmed as an event manager in late October 2014. Nithya Menen would reportedly play a negative role as Upendra's sister in the film. About Arjun's look, stylist Ashwin said it would reflect the current fashion trends in Milan, Paris and London (incorporating pieces from the autumn-winter 2014 and spring-summer 2015 collections).

Ashwin said that they shopped in Dubai because Arjun wanted to select his costumes, and the European capitals at that time had only winter collections. Arjun would have several hairstyles in the film. Upendra's role was reported to be a Tamil living in Madurai, and he was confirmed as the landlord at the end of January 2015. He was not included in the film's promotional activities since Srinivas did not want to reveal what he considered a crucial character. The way Kamal Haasan and Wasim Akram handled diabetes in real life inspired Srinivas to make Samantha's character diabetic in the film. Samantha was comfortable in the role, since she too had been diagnosed with the disease two years earlier.

Prakash Raj had a limited role, since Srinivas wanted to tell the story of a father by not showing him but instead showing his son's love and his influence on his life. The death of Sampath Raj's character was an accident because Srinivas did not believe in killing his antagonists directly, but to have them die as a result of their mistakes. Srinivas added that his death was planned so the film would have a good ending.

=== Filming ===
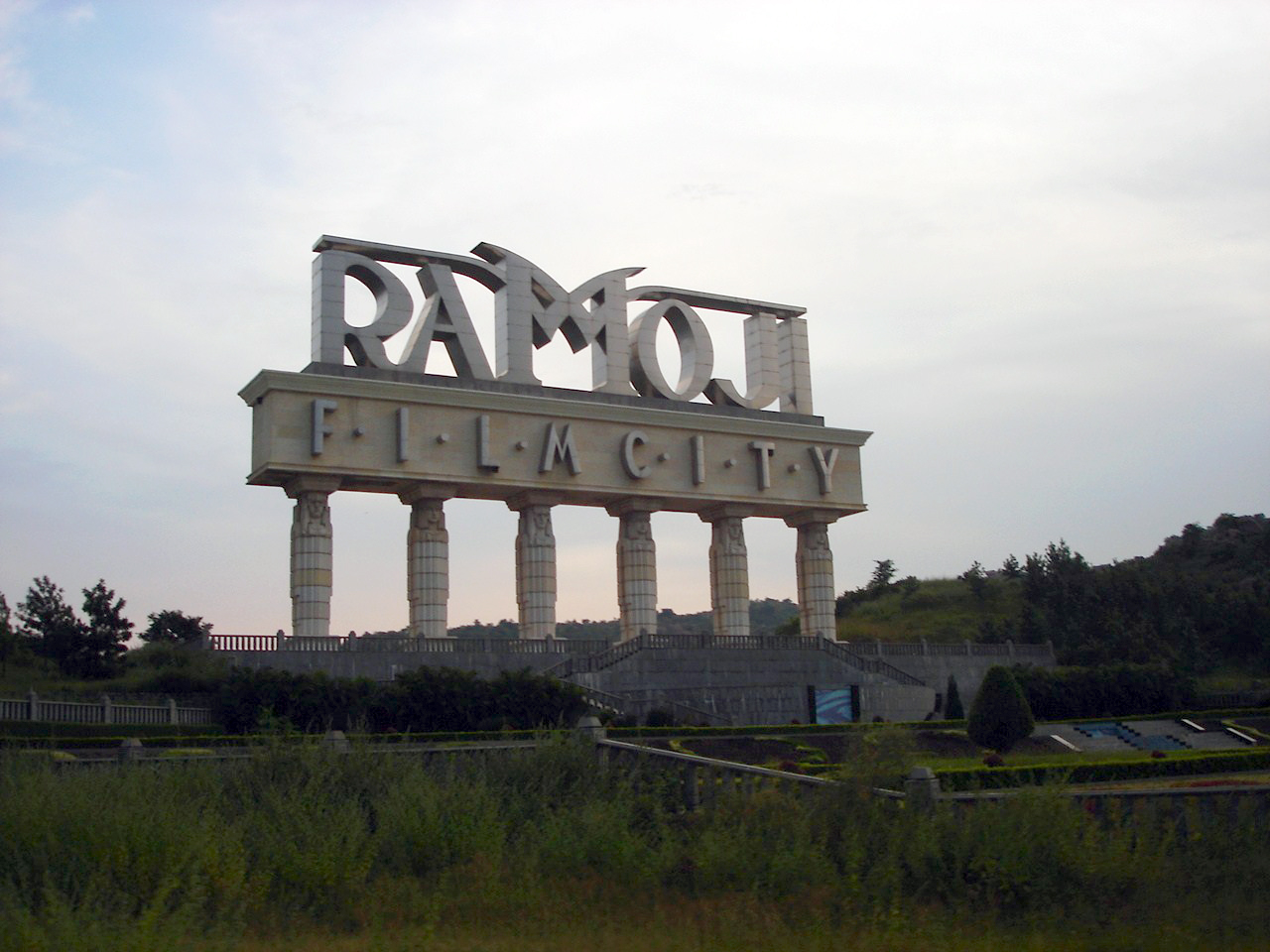
Ramoji Film City where Arjun's fight scenes were filmed under the supervision of Peter Hein

In early December 2013 it was announced that filming would begin the following February, after Arjun finished Race Gurram. At the end of March 2014, shooting was postponed to the following month and it was later announced that filming would start during the third week of April. In June, filming was again postponed to the following month, when Arjun was scheduled to finish Rudramadevi; he completed the film on 30 July.

Principal photography began on 19 September at a Hyderabad-based shopping mall. Samantha arrived at the set on 1 October 2014, after completing Kaththi, and Sharma joined the production unit five days later. A week-long shooting schedule planned at Ooty for scenes with Arjun, Upendra, Samantha and Sneha was disrupted because of unrest in Tamil Nadu due to Jayalalithaa's conviction, and the scenes were filmed near Shamshabad in Hyderabad. Art director Ravinder built a large outdoor set for the destination-wedding scene, with flowers flown in from Bangkok.

A fight scene with Arjun was shot at Ramoji Film City under the supervision of Peter Hein. A residential set was built at a cost of ₹3 crore by Ravinder in Kokapet, where scenes with Brahmanandam and Srinivasa Rao were filmed in late November 2014. The Kokapet set, of a Tamil house in Madurai, required three truckloads of trees from a farmhouse in Kadiam (near Rajahmundry) and materials from Delhi and Chennai. For the set, Srinivas and Ravinder travelled to a small city near Madurai and researched houses. By then, filming was nearly complete and the producers confirmed that the dialogue would be finished by the end of November and the songs shot the following month.

Filming was suspended because of a strike by Film Federation employees and the Memu Saitham Cyclone Hudhud relief fundraiser at Visakhapatnam. The strike was called off, and shooting resumed on 6 December. When Upendra finished his first shooting schedule for the film, he returned to the set of Uppi 2 on 10 December. In addition to Arjun's action sequences, Some more scenes were filmed at Ramoji Film City. Comedy sequences featuring Arjun and Samantha were shot at Hyderabad in late December.

Arjun spent the New Year with his wife and son in South Africa, and was scheduled to return to the set during the second week of January 2015. The final shooting schedule began on 6 January in Hyderabad. Additional filming of action and romantic scenes began on 20 January. S/O Satyamurthy's climactic scenes were filmed on the Kokapet house set in late January.

Shooting was scheduled to continue there until the first week of February, when the dialogue would be completed. A fight scene with Arjun and hundreds of other fighters was filmed in early February, and Upendra returned to the Hyderabad set for his scenes. A song, choreographed by Shekhar and featuring Arjun, Samantha and Menen, was filmed on the Kokapet house set in late February. The film unit then went to Spain to film three songs also featuring Arjun, Samantha and Menen, returning on 6 March. S/O Satyamurthy's principal photography completed when the last song (choreographed by Jani and featuring Arjun, Samantha and Sharma) was filmed on 11 March 2015 in a specially erected set at Annapurna Studios.

== Themes and influences ==
Although S/O Satyamurthy was reportedly about a conflict between two families, according to Upendra it revolves around three characters: one who follows his heart, a second who uses his brain and a third who uses his brawn. The characters are a wedding planner (Arjun), a wealthy businessman (Prasad) and a boss (Upendra). Srinivas told the Indo-Asian News Service that his film would highlight a father's role in a person's life, because more films dramatise relationships with mothers. S/O Satyamurthy has urban and rural settings similar to the director's previous film, Attarintiki Daredi (2013).

The film refers to situations in the Ramayana and the Mahabharata in the lives of Rama, Sita, Ravana, Yudhishthira and Karna and to the dowry system. Sangeetha Devi Dundoo of The Hindu wrote in her review that the film "attempts to break away from staid portrayal of women and notions of machismo in Telugu cinema". Upendra's character wants his wife to be happy, and hides his dark side from her; Samantha's character is diabetic, and the wall full of post-it notes in Rajendra Prasad's house illustrates marriages where communication has broken down. Dundoo notes lines of dialogue which "scoff" at people who call a girl unlucky if her engagement is broken.

For the scenes between M. S. Narayana and Rao Ramesh, Srinivas was inspired by his mother's maternal uncles in the village of Vegeswarapuram in West Godavari district. In an interview, the director said that the screenplay was based on situations faced by people close to him and how they handled them.

== Music ==
Devi Sri Prasad composed the soundtrack album and background score for S/O Satyamurthy. The soundtrack was scheduled to be released on 18 March. The complete album was released on 21 March 2015, coinciding with the Ugadi celebrations, on the H. I. C. C. Novotel Hotel in Hyderabad.

== Release ==
=== Theatrical ===
S/O Satyamurthy's release date was originally scheduled for 20 February 2015 in late November 2014, and was later postponed to 2 April (after the 2015 Cricket World Cup) due to post-production delays. After the film's review by the censors on 30 March 2015, its release date was rescheduled for 9 April.

S/O Satyamurthy was one of the rare Telugu films to be released in Tamil Nadu with English subtitles. The film was confirmed for release on 100 screens across Karnataka, at the same time as Rana Vikrama. Its global screen count was 1375, the largest Telugu film release of the year; however, it did not break the record 1450 screens set by 2014's Aagadu. S/O Satyamurthy's dubbed Malayalam version was released on 24 April. In 2015, the Hindi dubbing rights of the film were bought by Goldmines Telefilms and premiered on YouTube in same year.

=== Distribution ===
S/O Satyamurthy's overseas theatrical rights were sold to Classics Entertainment for an undisclosed sum in late October 2014, and days later its Karnataka rights were also sold for an undisclosed price. Dil Raju acquired the Nizam regional rights for ₹14 crore, one of the highest prices paid for Nizam rights to a film. Bhopal Reddy acquired the Karnataka regional distribution rights for ₹6 crore. The film's theatrical rights were sold for a total of ₹54 crore.

=== Marketing ===
Sai Gopal, who had assisted Srinivas since Swayamvaram (1999), orchestrated S/O Satyamurthy's promotion. Although the film was expected to preview in December 2014, its preliminary preview was released on 6 March 2015 (the night before Holi). The preview featured sixteen actors, including the leads (whose faces were blurred), and the film's logo was muted. In a press release, the producers announced that the film's promotion would be in full swing at the soundtrack release party, with party passes awarded to those predicting the sixteen actors on the preview poster.

Its 45-second advance-preview video was released on 7 March, receiving a good response on YouTube (where it was viewed by more than 300,000 people within 12 hours of its release). The film's logo was disclosed the following day. Thirty-one-second 2D and 3D motion posters featuring Arjun, created by Prawin Pudi and designed by Siva Kiran of Working Title, were released on 9 March and two preview posters of Arjun were distributed the following day.

S/O Satyamurthy's 27-second trailer was released on 11 March; two posters featuring Arjun, Samantha and Menen in Spain were distributed the following day, and a poster of Arjun was released on 14 March. The theatrical trailer had more than one million views on one YouTube channel in three and a half days, a record. The trailer for a promotional song with Arjun and Prasad was released on 28 March, and the song itself was released on 1 April at 11:00 pm IST. Arjun promoted the film's dubbed Malayalam version at the Lulu International Shopping Mall in Cochin on 21 April.

=== Home media ===
MAA TV acquired the film's broadcast-television rights for ₹9.5 crore. S/O Satyamurthy had its global television premiere on 19 July 2015 at 6 p.m. IST.

== Reception ==
S/O Satyamurthy grossed ₹20.5 crore on its first day at the global box office, the third-highest opening-day gross in the history of Telugu cinema. The film also had the best opening-day gross of Arjun's film career, breaking records set by 2014's Race Gurram (his previous film), Temper and Gopala Gopala. Trade analyst Trinath told IANS that the film grossed ₹33.5 crore in two days at the global box office, the biggest opening of the year to date. S/O Satyamurthy earned ₹26.92 crore in three days at the global box office. By the end of its first weekend, the film earned ₹30.31 crore and was the highest-grossing Telugu film of the year to date.

Gross earnings for the film's first weekend were ₹48.3 crore.S/O Satyamurthy netted about ₹3.5 crore and grossed ₹5 crore on its fifth day at the global box office, bringing its five-day global gross and net to ₹49.24 crore and ₹35.74 crore. By then, the film had recovered 60 per cent of its cost and was third on the list of Telugu films with all-time top first-week worldwide openings, behind Attarintiki Daredi (2013) and Yevadu (2014). S/O Satyamurthy's earnings dropped sharply on its seventh day, and its seven-day global earnings stood at ₹57.9 crore gross and ₹36.94 crore net.

The film crossed the ₹40-crore (400-million) mark on its eighth day, netting ₹43.24 crore and grossing more than ₹60 crore in eight days (recouping over 80 per cent of its cost). In eleven days, it netted a total of ₹42.55 crore and grossed ₹66.85 crore at the global box office. With consistent weekday performance, the film's fifteen-day global total gross and net figures were ₹71.35 crore and ₹45.05 crore.

During its third week, S/O Satyamurthy lost a large number of screens to new releases Dohchay, Kai Raja Kai, Aloukika and Avengers: Age of Ultron. The film still performed decently, grossing ₹5.05 crore and netting ₹2.17 crore in three days for an eighteen-day global total gross and net of ₹77.5 crore and ₹46.92 crore (surpassing the lifetime records of Naayak (2013), Racha (2012), Temper, Eega (2012), Govindudu Andarivadele and Gopala Gopala). It was the tenth-highest-grossing Telugu film of all time at the global box office. At the end of three weeks, S/O Satyamurthy grossed over ₹80 crore. Trade analyst Trinath told IANS that the film's three-week global net was over ₹50 crore, the seventh-highest-grossing Telugu film of all time at the global box office.

S/O Satyamurthy grossed ₹90.5 crore and netted a total of ₹51.9 crore at the global box office during its full run; of this, ₹50.75 crore was earned by the Telugu version. Arjun was the first Telugu actor with two consecutive films crossing the ₹50-crore mark at the global box office. Bangalore Mirror called S/O Satyamurthy a blockbuster, grossing ₹92 crore and netting over ₹60 crore at the global box office during its run.

=== India ===
The film grossed ₹11.89 crore at the Andhra Pradesh and Telangana box office, ₹4.35 crore in Karnataka and ₹60 lakh in the rest of India on its first day. Early trends suggested that S/O Satyamurthy would net ₹8.5 crore in Andhra Pradesh, and the official tally was ₹9.37 crore; it was the fourth-highest opening-day grossing Telugu film in the state, behind Attarintiki Daredi, Aagadu and Temper. The film earned more than ₹2.9 crore at the Bangalore box office, with an 80-percent occupancy for two days (the highest of Arjun's films to date). S/O Satyamurthy earned ₹7.2 crore in two days at the Karnataka box office.

It earned ₹5.15 crore and ₹4 crore on its second and third days in Andhra Pradesh/Telangana, bringing its three-day total to ₹18.42 crore. It earned approximately ₹2.5 crore in Karnataka, Tamil Nadu, Maharashtra and elsewhere in North India in three days. By the end of its first weekend, S/O Satyamurthy netted ₹20.71 crore, ₹3.5 crore and ₹1 crore in Andhra Pradesh, Karnataka and the rest of India respectively. Its first-weekend gross in Andhra Pradesh and Telangana was ₹31.5 crore and ₹6.6 crore, ₹1.2 crore, and ₹60 lakh in Karnataka, Tamil Nadu and the rest of India respectively.

S/O Satyamurthy performed well on its fifth day, earning ₹2.16 crore in Andhra Pradesh for a five-day total of ₹22.87 crore. The film's sixth-day Andhra Pradesh earnings were ₹2.38 crore, bringing its six-day total in the state to ₹25.25 crore. S/O Satyamurthy was the sixth-highest first-week earning Telugu film in Andhra Pradesh, at ₹26.24 crore. The film earned ₹3.9 crore and ₹1.2 crore in Karnataka and the rest of India in its first week. Its Karnataka gross was ₹4.75 crore, the highest ever for a Telugu film in the state.

It was the fourth Arjun film to net ₹1 crore in the Nizam region, (Note: For film trade purpose, the Nizam region includes the three districts of Kalaburagi, Bidar, and Raichur in Karnataka and seven districts in the Marathwada region including Aurangabad, Latur, Nanded, Parbhani, Beed, Jalna and Osmanabad apart from the state of Telangana.) after Julai, Iddarammayilatho (2013) and Race Gurram. In eighteen days, the film netted ₹33.72 crore, ₹5.45 crore, ₹63 lakh and ₹72 lakh in AP/Nizam, Karnataka, Tamil Nadu and the rest of India respectively. During its run S/O Satyamurthy netted ₹37.65 crore, ₹5.8 crore, ₹63 lakh and ₹72 lakh in AP/Nizam, Karnataka, Tamil Nadu and the rest of India respectively, ₹14.05 crore in the Nizam region alone.

=== Overseas ===
S/O Satyamurthy grossed ₹3.75 crore on its first day at the overseas box office. According to Taran Adarsh, the film earned $347,267 on its Wednesday premiere in the United States and was the second-highest US premiere grosser (behind Aagadu). It earned $136,168 on Thursday, bringing its two-day US box-office total to $483,435 (about ₹3.01 crore). S/O Satyamurthy earned $233,870 on Friday, bringing its three-day US box-office total to $720,984 (about ₹4.49 crore).

The film passed the million-dollar mark on Sunday, the second Telugu film of 2015 to do so (after Temper). Gross overseas receipts for the first weekend were ₹8.46 crore, with net earnings of ₹5.1 crore. The film continued a good run on the international market despite a drop in collections in India, earning ₹5.6 crore in eight days.

S/O Satyamurthy lost 60 per cent of its screens after the release of OK Bangaram, but (according to Taran Adarsh) earned $1,235,073 by 19 April 2015. It broke the lifetime records of Temper, Gopala Gopala and Govindudu Andarivadele in 11 days, and was the ninth-highest-grossing Telugu film of all time at the US box office. The film earned a distributor share of ₹5.2 crore in the US and ₹70 lakh at the remaining overseas box offices during its run.

=== Critical response ===
S/O Satyamurthy received generally positive reviews from critics. According to Sangeetha Devi Dundoo of The Hindu, "We've seen enough films with characters placed in the villain's den. Thankfully, the drama is lively and fun moments come through Ali and Brahmanandam. Allu Arjun shoulders the film with his remarkable performance and seems to be getting better with each film. The film's biggest undoing is its length. A trimmer version would be far more engaging". Pranitha Jonnalagedda of The Hans India wrote, "No denying that there are moments of crazy laughter, witty remarks and some thought-provoking words, but Trivikram's benchmark is set so high that the writing of this film doesn't excite us enough. All said and done, if you are a lover of a Telugu cinema who enjoys watching the hero being the Good Samaritan and fancy a few tear-jerking moments, this film is definitely for you!" Madhavi Tata of Outlook India gave the film three out of five stars, writing that Trivikram's screenplay "has too many sub-plots, but the dialogues sparkle, especially when mouthed by veteran actors". Tata called the film's humour a "big draw", with the best saved for Brahmanandam. Hemanth Kumar of The Times of India gave S/O Satyamurthy three out of five stars, writing that the film "works well as an idea, and leaves you with enough questions and thoughts to reflect upon your own life, but as a cinematic experience, it leaves a lot to be desired".

Suresh Kavirayani of Deccan Chronicle gave S/O Satyamurthy 2.5 out of five stars: "Trivikram has continued the Attarintiki Daredi trend of rich-kid-giving-up-luxuries in this film too. But, the hallmark of the director is missing from this movie. The punch dialogues associated with his films are missing and the screenplay is so-so". Karthik Keramalu of CNN-IBN also gave the film 2.5 out of five stars, calling it an "inconsistent drama with over-the-top action and a grand message" and adding: "If only the screenplay had matched the quality of Allu Arjun's style, which is impeccably taken care of, Trivikram would have won the S/O Satyamurthy lottery". IANS gave S/O Satyamurthy two out of five stars: "While all the quintessential Trivikram trademark moments can be found in S/O Satyamurthy, what you miss is the magic he created in his career's best film Athadu", adding that the film is a "predictable and sloppy family drama with a few high and mostly low moments".

== Accolades ==
| Ceremony | Category | Nominee | Result | Ref. |
|---|---|---|---|---|
| IIFA Utsavam 2015 | Best Performance in a Leading Role – Male | Allu Arjun | Nominated | |
| IIFA Utsavam 2015 | Best Lyrics | Devi Sri Prasad (for the song "Super Machi") | Nominated | |
| Gulf Andhra Music Awards | Best Commercial Song | Devi Sri Prasad and Sravana Bhargavi (for the song "Super Machi") | Won | |
| Gulf Andhra Music Awards | Best Upcoming Singer – Male | Yazin Nizar (for the song "Seethakalam") | Won | |

63rd Filmfare Awards

- Best Director – Trivikram Srinivas – Nominated
- Best Actor – Allu Arjun – Nominated

5th SIIMA

- Best Actress (Telugu) – Samantha Ruth Prabhu – Nominated
- Best Supporting Actor (Telugu) – Upendra – Nominated
- Best Supporting Actress (Telugu) – Sneha – Nominated
- Best Comedian (Telugu) – Ali – Nominated
- Best Music Director (Telugu) – Devi Sri Prasad – Nominated
- Best Lyricist (Telugu) – Devi Sri Prasad (for "Super Machi") – Nominated

2016 CineMAA Awards

- Best Music Director – Devi Sri Prasad – Won
- Special Appreciation – Rajendra Prasad – Won

== Legacy ==
A dialogue from the film, Maa nanna drushtilo, bharyante nacchi techukune badhyata, pillalu moyyalanipinche baruvu. Kani naa drushtilo nannante marchipoleni gnapakam ("According to my father, a wife is a voluntary duty and kids are the burden we love to bear. But for me, my father is an unforgettable memory") was spoofed by the producers of the film Kobbari Matta in its promotion. Sakshi published a spoof of the film on 19 May 2015 in which Prakash Raj was replaced by Brahmanandam as the protagonist's father, who tells his son not to follow ethics and values but to give importance only to money.

== See also ==
- List of films featuring diabetes
