= Ravi Teja filmography =

Ravi Teja is an Indian actor and film producer who predominantly works in Telugu cinema. He is known for his roles in action comedy films. In 2018, he was one of the highest-paid actors in the Telugu film industry. He has won three state Nandi Awards and one Filmfare Award South. He is popularly known by the moniker "Mass Maharaja".

He first appeared in an uncredited role in the 1990 film Karthavyam, and played minor or uncredited roles in many films such as Allari Priyudu (1993), Ninne Pelladata (1996). Then, he appeared in meatier supporting roles in films like Sindhooram (1997), Manasichi Choodu (1998), Premaku Velayara (1999), Samudram (1999), Annayya (2000) among others throughout the '90s. He also worked as an assistant director for several films.

His debut in a lead role came in the 1999 film Nee Kosam which was an average grosser at the box office, but his performance in the film earned him the Nandi Special Jury Award. He subsequently became an established lead actor through the films Itlu Sravani Subramanyam (2001), Avunu Valliddaru Ista Paddaru! (2002), and Idiot (2002) which became commercially successful.

He then went onto star in notable films like Khadgam (2002), Amma Nanna O Tamila Ammayi (2003), Venky (2004), Naa Autograph (2004), Bhadra (2005), Vikramarkudu (2006), Dubai Seenu (2007), Krishna (2008), Neninthe (2008), Kick (2009), Sambho Siva Sambho (2010), Don Seenu (2010), Mirapakay (2011), Balupu (2013), Power (2014), Bengal Tiger (2015), Raja the Great (2017), Krack (2021), Dhamaka (2022), and Waltair Veerayya (2023), Irumudi (2026).

== Film ==
=== As an actor ===
Key
†	Denotes films that have not yet been released

- All films are in Telugu, unless otherwise noted.

List of Ravi Teja film acting credits
Year	Title	Role(s)	Notes	Ref.
1990	Karthavyam	Chakravarthy's friend	Uncredited	
1990	Abhimanyu	Student leader	Kannada film; uncredited	
1991	Chaitanya	Racer	Uncredited	
1992	Aaj Ka Goonda Raj	Raja's friend	Hindi film; uncredited	
1992	Collector Gari Alludu	College student / MLA's son	Uncredited	
1992	Laati	Avinash's henchman	Uncredited	
1993	Allari Priyudu	Raja's friend	Uncredited	
1993	Varasudu	Student	Uncredited	
1996	Ninne Pelladata	Mahalakshmi's eve teaser	Uncredited	
1997	Sindhooram	Chanti		
1998	Padutha Theeyaga	Sai		
1998	O Panaipothundi Babu	Lakshaman, Lakshman (Note: Ravi Teja played two characters.)		
1998	Manasichi Choodu	Chanti		
1999	Seetharama Raju	Seenu		
1999	Preminche Manasu	Vasanth Kumar / Ranjanipriya		
1999	Premaku Velayara	Ravi		
1999	Samudram	Chepala Nani		
1999	Nee Kosam	Ravi	Debut in lead role; Nandi Special Jury Award	
2000	Annayya	Ravi		
2000	Kshemamga Velli Labhamga Randi	Appala Raju		
2000	Manasichanu	Suryakanth		
2000	Sakutumba Saparivaara Sametam	Ravi		
2000	Tirumala Tirupati Venkatesa	Tirupathi		
2001	Chiranjeevulu	Charan		
2001	Vande Matharam	Citizen rights council member	Kannada film	
2001	Budget Padmanabham	Ravi		
2001	Ammayi Kosam	Ravi		
2001	Itlu Sravani Subramanyam	Subramanyam		
2002	Avunu Valliddaru Ista Paddaru!	Anil Kumar		
2002	Idiot	Chanti		
2002	Khadgam	Koti	Nandi Special Jury Award	
2002	Anveshana	Vamsy		
2003	Ee Abbai Chala Manchodu	Vivekananda		
2003	Amma Nanna O Tamila Ammayi	Chandu		
2003	Oka Raju Oka Rani	Ravi		
2003	Dongodu	Meesala Madhava		
2003	Veede	Yedukondalu		
2004	Venky	Venkateswara "Venky" Rao		
2004	Naa Autograph	Seenu		
2004	Chanti	Chanti		
2005	Bhadra	Bhadra		
2005	Bhageeratha	Chandu		
2006	Shock	Chandra Shekar		
2006	Vikramarkudu	DCP Vikram Singh Rathore IPS, Athili Sathi Babu		
2006	Khatarnak	Dasu		
2007	Dubai Seenu	Srinivas "Seenu" Rao		
2007	Shankar Dada Zindabad	Himself	Special appearance in the song "Jagadeka Veerudiki"	
2008	Krishna	Krishna		
2008	Baladur	Chanti		
2008	Neninthe	Ravi	Nandi Award for Best Actor	
2009	Kick	Kalyan		
2009	Anjaneyulu	Anjaneyulu		
2010	Sambho Siva Sambho	Karna		
2010	Don Seenu	Srinivasa Rao alias Don Seenu		
2011	Mirapakay	Rishikesh		
2011	Dongala Mutha	Sudheer		
2011	Veera	Veera Venkata Satyanarayana / Deva (Note: Ravi Teja played a single character with two or more names.)		
2011	Katha Screenplay Darsakatvam Appalaraju	Body double of himself	Cameo	
2012	Nippu	Surya		
2012	Daruvu	Bullet Raja, Ravindra		
2012	Devudu Chesina Manushulu	Ravi Teja		
2012	Sarocharu	Karthik		
2013	Balupu	Ravi		
2014	Power	Tirupathi / ACP Baldev Sahay		
2014	Romeo	Himself	Guest appearance	
2015	Kick 2	Kalyan, Robin Hood		
2015	Bengal Tiger	Akash Narayana		
2015	Dongaata	Himself	Guest appearance in the song "Break Up Antu"	
2015	Vajrakaya	Himself	Kannada film; Special appearance in a song "Vajrakaya"	
2017	Raja The Great	Raja		
2018	Touch Chesi Chudu	ACP Karthikeya (Karthik)		
2018	Nela Ticket	Nela Ticket		
2018	Amar Akbar Anthony	Amar / Akbar / Anthony (Note: Ravi Teja played a single character with three different personalities.)		
2020	Disco Raja	Disco Raja, Vasu		
2021	Krack	CI Pothuraju Veera Shankar		
2022	Khiladi	Mohan Gandhi / Khiladi		
2022	Ramarao on Duty	B. Ramarao		
2022	Dhamaka	Swamy Vivekananda Rao / Anand Chakravarthy		
2023	Waltair Veerayya	ACP Vikram Sagar IPS		
2023	Ravanasura	Adv. Ravindra		
2023	Tiger Nageswara Rao	Tiger Nageswara Rao		
2024	Eagle	Sahadev Varma (Eagle)		
2024	Mr. Bachchan	Indukuri Anand		
2025	Mass Jathara	Lakshman Bheri		
2026	Bhartha Mahasayulaku Wignyapthi	Ram Sathyanarayana / Elvis		
2026	Irumudi	Trinadh Rama Kasu		
2027	Thulabharam †	TBA	Directed by Vivek Athreya	

=== As producer ===
List of Ravi Teja film producer credits
Year	Title	Notes	Ref.
2022	FIR	Telugu dubbed version; as presenter	
2022	Gatta Kusthi	Tamil film	
2023	Ravanasura		
2023	Changure Bangaru Raja		
2024	Sundaram Master		

=== As voice actor ===
List of Ravi Teja film voice acting credits
Year	Title	Role	Notes	Ref.
2010	Maryada Ramanna	Ramanna's Bicycle		
2013	Doosukeltha	Narrator		
2018	Awe	Chanti, a bonsai tree		
2023	Mahaveerudu	Mahaveerudu	Telugu language dubbed version of Maaveeran	
2024	Hanu-Man	Koti, a monkey		

=== Television ===
List of Ravi Teja television acting credits
Year	Title	Role	Channel	Notes	Ref.
1997–2000	Ruthuragalu	Unknown	DD Saptagiri	Guest appearance	
