= Naayak (soundtrack) =

Soundtrack album by S. Thaman
- Released: 17 December 2012
- Recorded: 2012
- Genre: Feature film soundtrack
- Length: 25:57
- Language: Telugu
- Label: Aditya Music
- Producer: S. Thaman

S. Thaman chronology
Kanna Laddu Thinna Aasaiya (2012)	Naayak (2012)	Settai (2013)

Naayak is the soundtrack album to the 2013 film of the same name directed by V. V. Vinayak starring Ram Charan. The film's musical score is composed by S. Thaman and featured six songs under the lyrics of Chandrabose, Veturi Sundararama Murthy, Bhaskarabhatla Ravi Kumar and Sahithi. The soundtrack was released under the Aditya Music label on 17 December 2012.

== Development ==
S. Thaman composed the film's soundtrack and background score, in his first collaboration with both V. V. Vinayak and Ram Charan. In April 2012, it was reported that Thaman was composing the film's songs with a focus on romantic songs featuring the two female leads. The song "Subhalekha Rasukunna", originally composed by Ilaiyaraaja for the soundtrack of the Telugu film Kondaveeti Donga (1990), was remixed for this film in mid-July 2012 without any alterations in the tune and lyrics written by Veturi. The lyrics of the remaining five songs were penned by Chandrabose, Bhaskarabhatla Ravi Kumar and Sahithi.

== Release ==
Aditya Music acquired the audio rights for an undisclosed high price. The audio teasers were unveiled in mid-December 2012, and the official track list featuring six songs was unveiled on 14 December 2012. The film's soundtrack was launched on 17 December 2012, during a promotional event at Ramanaidu Studios. Pawan Kalyan, Allu Arjun and S. S. Rajamouli attended the function as the chief guests along with the film's principal cast and crew.

== Reception ==
Karthik Srinivasan of Milliblog called it as a "solid masala soundtrack from Thaman". A. S. Sashidhar of The Times of India stated that "the music is very peppy and has a dance feel to it." Likewise, a reviewer from Sify complimented four of the six songs and Thaman's background score, while Jeevi of Idlebrain.com considered it to be a plus and praised the picturisation of the songs; he chose "Laila O Laila", "Subhalekha Rasukunna" and "Hey Naayak" as his picks from the album. Mahalakshmi Prabhakaran of Daily News and Analysis added that "the songs are good and the locales extremely beautiful."

== Track listing ==
No.	Title	Lyrics	Artist(s)	Length
1.	"Laila O Laila"	Chandrabose	Shankar Mahadevan, Ranjith, Rahul Nambiar, Naveen Madhav	04:35
2.	"Kathi Lanti Pilla"	Chandrabose	S. Thaman, Shefali Alvaris	03:53
3.	"Subhalekha Rasukunna"	Veturi	Haricharan, Shreya Ghoshal	04:12
4.	"Oka Choopuke Padipoya"	Bhaskarabhatla Ravi Kumar	Vijay Prakash, Bindu Mahima	04:46
5.	"Nellorae"	Sahithi	Suchitra, Jaspreet Jasz	03:53
6.	"Hey Naayak"	Chandrabose	Shreya Ghoshal, Naveen Madhav	04:38
Total length:				25:57

== Credits ==
- Music composed, arranged and programmed by – S. Thaman
- Live drums – Anandan Sivamani
- Electric and acoustic guitar – Keba Jeremiah, Kabuli
- Bass guitar – Aalap Raju, Keba Jeremiah
- Strings – Keba Jeremiah, Kabuli (session conductor), Srinivasa Rajulu
- Trumpet and trombones – Babu, Maxwell
- Shehnai – Balesh
- Flute – Kiran
- Clarinet – Sax Raja
- Glass harmonica – Chinna, Kabuli
- Additional vocal programming – KC
- Additional vocal supervision – Muralidhar, Mallikarjuna Rao
- Harmonies – Geetha Madhuri, Bindhu, Parnika, Deepthi, Srivardhini Kuchi, Rita Thyagarajan, Megha, Ramya NSK, Vandana Srinivasan, M. M. Manasi, M. M. Monisha, Deepu, Krishna, KC, Rahul Nambiar, Naveen Madhav, Ranjith, Sam, Senthil, Belly Raj
- Recorded at TAAL Studios, Prasad Studios (Hyderabad) and NYSA Studios (Mumbai)
- Recording engineers – S. Chandru, Shadab Rayeen, Muralidhar
- Mixing engineers – Shadab Rayeen, Muralidhar
- Studio assistance – Ranjith, Vinoth

== Awards and nominations ==
Award	Date of ceremony	Category	Recipient(s) and nominee(s)	Result	Ref.
Filmfare Awards South	12 July 2014	Best Female Playback Singer – Telugu	Shreya Ghoshal (for the song "Hey Naayak")	Nominated	
South Indian International Movie Awards	12–13 September 2014	Best Music Director – Telugu	S. Thaman	Nominated	
South Indian International Movie Awards	12–13 September 2014	Best Female Playback Singer – Telugu	Shreya Ghoshal (for the song "Hey Naayak")	Nominated	
