= S. Radha Krishna =

Indian film producer

- Born: Suryadevara Radhakrishna; Guntur, Andhra Pradesh, India
- Occupation: Film producer
- Years active: 2012–present
- Children: Haarika; Haasini (daughters)
- Relatives: S. Naga Vamsi (nephew)

Suryadevara Radha Krishna, also known as S. Radha Krishna or Chinna Babu, is an Indian film producer known for his works in Telugu cinema. He produces films under his production house, Haarika & Hassine Creations. Even though his other production house, Sithara Entertainments, is his own, his nephew, Suryadevara Naga Vamsi, mainly produces the films under the banner, while he presents them.

He made his film debut in 1988 by producing Aathmakatha, a Telugu remake of Mahesh Bhatt's 1985 film Janam. Years later, he associated with producer DVV Danayya, where he presented Julayi (2012), while Radha Krishna presented Cameraman Gangatho Rambabu (2012) and Naayak (2013). He then went on to form a long association with Trivikram Srinivas from Julayi (2012) and later produced his S/O Satyamurthy (2015), A Aa (2016), Agnyaathavaasi (2018), Aravinda Sametha Veera Raghava (2018), and Ala Vaikunthapurramuloo (2020).

== Production company ==
Haarika and Hassine Creations
- Trade name: Haarika & Hassine Creations
- Type: Privately held company
- Industry: Entertainment
- Founded: 2012; 14 years ago in Hyderabad, Andhra Pradesh, India
- Headquarters: Hyderabad, Telangana, India, India
- Key people: S. Radha Krishna; Suryadevara Naga Vamsi; Mamtha
- Products: Films
- Owner: S. Radha Krishna
- Subsidiaries: Sithara Entertainments
- Website: YouTube Channel

Haarika and Hassine Creations (d.b.a Haarika & Hassine Creations) is an Indian film production company based in Hyderabad. It was established by S. Radha Krishna in 2012. The company also has a subsidiary production company named Sithara Entertainments.

The company's debut production was Julayi starring Allu Arjun, Ileana D'Cruz, Sonu Sood, Rajendra Prasad and directed by Trivikram Srinivas. Upon release, the film received positive reviews, and was commercially successful. The film has garnered the Nandi Award for Best Popular Feature Film. It was remade into Tamil titled as Saagasam (2016).

The company's second production was 2015 Telugu film S/O Satyamurthy collaborating with both Trivikram and Allu Arjun for the second time. In 2016, they produced A Aa, directed by Trivikram and starring Nithiin and Samantha Ruth Prabhu.

In 2018, the company produced 2 films directed by Trivikram. Agnyaathavaasi starring Pawan Kalyan and Aravinda Sametha Veera Raghava starring N. T. Rama Rao Jr. and Pooja Hegde. Aravinda Sametha received positive response and was a blockbuster. The film was nominated for SIIMA Award for Best Film – Telugu. The film collected 195 cores in box office worldwide.

The company's 2020 film Ala Vaikunthapurramuloo starring Allu Arjun, Pooja Hegde and Tabu became one of the highest grossing Telugu films of all time. The film received positive response from both critics and audience and won SIIMA Award for Best Film – Telugu and Sakshi Excellence Awards. The company then produced Ala Vaikunthapurramuloo's Hindi remake, titled Shehzada directed by Rohit Dhawan.

== Filmography ==
Key
†	Denotes films that have not yet been released

=== Haarika and Hassine Creations ===
List of S. Radha Krishna film credits as producer
Year	Title	Language	Notes
1988	Aathma Katha	Telugu	Executive producer
2012	Julayi	Telugu	Presented by DVV Danayya
2015	S/O Satyamurthy	Telugu	
2016	A Aa	Telugu	
2018	Agnyaathavaasi	Telugu	
2018	Aravinda Sametha Veera Raghava	Telugu	
2020	Ala Vaikunthapurramuloo	Telugu	Co-produced with Allu Aravind
2023	Shehzada	Hindi	Co-produced with Bhushan Kumar, Krishan Kumar, Aman Gill, Allu Aravind, Kartik Aaryan
2024	Guntur Kaaram	Telugu	
2026	Aadarsha Kutumbam House No: 47 - AK47	Telugu	

=== Awards and nominations ===
List of S. Radha Krishna awards and nominations
Ceremony	Year	Category	Nominee	Result	Ref.
Nandi Awards	2012	Best Popular Feature Film	Julayi	Won	
Gaddar Awards	2020	Best Feature Film (Gold)	Ala Vaikunthapurramuloo	Won	
Filmfare Awards South	2013	Best Film – Telugu	Julayi	Nominated	
Filmfare Awards South	2017	Best Film – Telugu	A Aa	Nominated	
Filmfare Awards South	2022	Best Film – Telugu	Ala Vaikunthapurramuloo	Nominated	
South Indian International Movie Awards	2013	Best Film – Telugu	Julayi	Nominated	
South Indian International Movie Awards	2017	Best Film – Telugu	A Aa	Nominated	
South Indian International Movie Awards	2019	Best Film – Telugu	Aravinda Sametha Veera Raghava	Nominated	
South Indian International Movie Awards	2021	Best Film – Telugu	Ala Vaikunthapurramuloo	Won	
Sakshi Excellence Awards	2021	Most Popular Movie	Ala Vaikunthapurramuloo	Won	

=== Sithara Entertainments ===
List of Sithara Entertainments film credits
Year	Title	Language	Notes
2016	Babu Bangaram	Telugu	
2016	Premam	Telugu	Remake of Premam
2018	Sailaja Reddy Alludu	Telugu	
2019	Jersey	Telugu	
2019	Ranarangam	Telugu	
2020	Bheeshma	Telugu	
2021	Rang De	Telugu	
2021	Varudu Kaavalenu	Telugu	
2022	DJ Tillu	Telugu	Co-produced by Fortune Four Cinemas
2022	Bheemla Nayak	Telugu	Remake of Ayyappanum Koshiyum
2022	Jersey	Hindi	Co-produced by Allu Aravind, Dil Raju, and Aman Gill; Remake of Jersey
2022	Swathi Muthyam	Telugu	Co-produced by Fortune Four Cinemas
2023	Buttabomma	Telugu	Co-produced by Fortune Four Cinemas; Remake of Kappela
2023	Vaathi; Sir	Tamil; Telugu	Co-produced by Fortune Four Cinemas and Srikara Studios
2023	Mad	Telugu	Co-produced by Fortune Four Cinemas and Srikara Studios
2023	Aadikeshava	Telugu	Co-produced by Fortune Four Cinemas and Srikara Studios
2024	Tillu Square	Telugu	Co-produced by Fortune Four Cinemas and Srikara Studios
2024	Gangs of Godavari	Telugu	Co-produced by Fortune Four Cinemas and Srikara Studios
2024	Lucky Baskhar	Telugu	Co-produced by Fortune Four Cinemas and Srikara Studios
2025	Daaku Maharaaj	Telugu	Co-produced by Fortune Four Cinemas and Srikara Studios
2025	Mad Square	Telugu	Co-produced by Fortune Four Cinemas and Srikara Studios
2025	Kingdom	Telugu	Co-produced by Fortune Four Cinemas and Srikara Studios
2025	Mass Jathara	Telugu	Co-produced by Fortune Four Cinemas and Srikara Studios
2026	Anaganaga Oka Raju	Telugu	Co-produced by Fortune Four Cinemas and Srikara Studios
2026	Funky	Telugu	Co-produced by Fortune Four Cinemas and Srikara Studios
2026	Lenin	Telugu	Co-produced by Annapurna Studios
2026	Vishwanath & Sons	Tamil	Co-produced by Fortune Four Cinemas and Srikara Studios
2026	Epic	Telugu	Co-produced by Fortune Four Cinemas and Srikara Studios
TBA	Alcohol †	Telugu	Co-produced by Fortune Four Cinemas and Srikara Studios
TBA	Magic †	Telugu	Co-produced by Fortune Four Cinemas and Srikara Studios
TBA	VISA - Vintara Saradaga †	Telugu	Co-produced by Fortune Four Cinemas and Srikara Studios
TBA	Mad Juniors †	Telugu	Co-produced by Fortune Four Cinemas and Srikara Studios
TBA	Takshakudu †	Telugu	Co-produced by Fortune Four Cinemas and Srikara Studios
TBA	Tillu Cube †	Telugu	Co-produced by Fortune Four Cinemas and Srikara Studios

=== Awards and nominations ===
List of Sithara Entertainments awards and nominations
Ceremony	Year	Category	Nominee	Result	Ref.
Gaddar Awards	2019	Best Feature Film (Silver)	Jersey	Won	
Gaddar Awards	2024	Best Feature Film (Bronze)	Lucky Baskhar	Won	
Filmfare Awards South	2024	Best Film - Telugu	DJ Tillu	Nominated	
National Film Awards	2021	Best Telugu Feature Film	Jersey	Won	
South Indian International Movie Awards	2021	Best Film - Telugu	Jersey	Won	
South Indian International Movie Awards	2023	Best Film - Telugu	DJ Tillu	Nominated	

As presenter

List of film credits as presenter
Year	Title	Language	Notes
2012	Cameraman Gangatho Rambabu	Telugu	Produced by DVV Danayya
2013	Naayak	Telugu	Produced by DVV Danayya
2014	Lovers	Telugu	Produced by Suryadevara Naga Vamsi and B. Mahendra Babu under Mayabazar Movies

As distributor

List of film credits as distributor
Year	Title	Language	Notes
2023	Leo	Tamil	Distribution of Telugu dubbed version only
2024	Bramayugam	Malayalam	Distribution of Telugu dubbed version only
2024	Devara: Part 1	Telugu	Distribution in Andhra Pradesh and Telangana
2025	Retro	Tamil	Distribution of Telugu dubbed version only
2025	War 2	Hindi	Distribution of Telugu dubbed version only
2025	They Call Him OG	Telugu	Distribution in Ceded only
2026	Jailer 2	Tamil	Distribution of Telugu dubbed version only
2026	Om	Tamil	Distribution of Telugu dubbed version only
