= Chota K. Naidu =

Indian cinematographer (born 1962)

- Born: 3 July 1962 (age 64); Ramachandrapuram, Andhra Pradesh, India
- Other name: Chota
- Occupations: Cinematographer and Oscar Jury Member
- Years active: 1989–present
- Relatives: Shyam K. Naidu (brother); Sundeep Kishan (nephew)
- Awards: Two Nandi Awards; Two Filmfare Awards South

Chota K. Naidu (born 3 July 1962) is an Indian cinematographer known for his work primarily in Telugu cinema. Naidu has received two state Nandi Awards for his work in Anji (2004) and Kotha Bangaru Lokam (2008), along with two Filmfare Awards South for Kotha Bangaru Lokam and Damarukam (2012).

His contributions as a Director of Photography (DOP) in Telugu, Tamil, and Hindi films, as well as in television, have been widely appreciated over the past 30 years. He is a member of the Indian Society of Cinematographers, the South Indian Cinematographers Association, and the Telugu Cinematographers Association.

== Early life ==
Chota K. Naidu was born in Ramachandrapuram, East Godavari district, Andhra Pradesh. His father, Chitti Babu Naidu, was a writer and director of stage plays, while his mother, Ananthalakshmi, was a housewife. He has a younger brother, Shyam K. Naidu, who is also a cinematographer in Telugu cinema.

Despite being born into a family of engineers, Naidu spent much of his time watching films rather than focusing on his studies, which resulted in his failure in the 10th standard exams. To gain more exposure to films, he worked as a gatekeeper at a nearby theatre and ultimately failed his supplementary exams due to his continued interest in cinema. Recognizing his passion, his father challenged him to pass his 10th standard exams, promising to assist him in entering the film industry if he succeeded. Naidu accepted the challenge, passed with good marks, and as promised, his father secured him a position as a camera apprentice at Devar Films' outdoor unit in Chennai in 1979.

Later, Naidu joined the Taraka Prabhu outdoor unit under Dasari Narayana Rao, where he worked with prominent cinematographers throughout India during the 1980s as a focus puller. He was particularly inspired by Director of Photography V. S. R. Swamy, whom he admired for his discipline, dedication, and craft, considering Swamy his role model.

== Career ==
Naidu's first opportunity as a DOP was for the telefilm Kristhu Jananam (1987), directed by Bharath Parepalli and produced by P. Seetha Devi, who later became his wife.

Following this, he continuously worked on various regional and national television projects and TV commercials, evolving his craftsmanship in the process.

Naidu's first film as a cinematographer was Dasari Narayana Rao's Amma Rajinama (1991). He collaborated with Dasari Narayana Rao on several other films, including Venkanna Babu, Surigadu, and Santaan. Other notable directors he worked with include E.V.V. Satyanarayana on Varasudu, Maga Rayudu, Veedevadandi Babu, and Maavidaakulu; Kranthi Kumar on Bhale Pellam; K. Raghavendra Rao on Allari Premikudu, Bombay Priyudu, and Gangotri; Ramgopal Varma on Deyyam; Suresh Krissna on Master, Daddy, and Baba (Tamil); Satish Kaushik for Prem (Hindi); Gunasekhar on Choodalani Vundi; David Dhawan for Kunwara (Hindi); A.R. Murugadoss on Stalin; Trivikram Srinivas for Julai; and V.V. Vinayak on Tagore, Bunny, Lakshmi, Krishna, Adhurs, Naayak, and Alludu Seenu.

=== Style ===
Naidu received critical acclaim for his debut telefilm Kristhu Jananam, which featured rich, painting-like cinematography depicting the times of Jesus Christ.

For Matru Devo Bhava, he employed chiaroscuro and silhouette techniques to convey a predominantly tragic narrative.

Varasudu marked his first significant commercial success, where he utilized a commercial style of lighting and a carefully selected color palette to portray grandeur.

== Personal life ==
Chota K. Naidu is married to Seetha Devi. Naidu's nephew Sundeep Kishan is a film actor.

== Filmography ==
Year	Title	Language	Notes
1991	Amma Rajinama	Telugu	
1992	Venkanna Babu	Telugu	
1992	Surigadu	Telugu	
1992	Raguluthunna Bharatham	Telugu	
1992	Dr. Ambedkar	Hindi	
1993	Varasudu	Telugu	
1993	Mathru Devo Bhava	Telugu	
1993	Santaan	Hindi	
1994	Maga Rayudu	Telugu	
1994	Bhale Pellam	Telugu	
1994	Allari Premikudu	Telugu	
1995	Prem	Hindi	
1995	Taj Mahal	Telugu	
1995	Kondapalli Rathaiah	Telugu	
1996	Mrugam	Telugu	
1996	Deyyam	Telugu	
1996	Bombay Priyudu	Telugu	
1997	Veedevadandi Babu	Telugu	
1997	Master	Telugu	
1998	Maavidaakulu	Telugu	
1998	Tholi Prema	Telugu	
1998	Choodalani Vundi	Telugu	
1998	Eshwar Alla	Telugu	
2000	Annayya	Telugu	
2000	Pukar	Hindi	
2000	Kunwara	Hindi	
2000	Azad	Telugu	
2001	Eduruleni Manishi	Telugu	
2001	Daddy	Telugu	
2002	Kya Yehi Pyaar Hai	Hindi	
2002	Neetho	Telugu	
2002	Baba	Tamil	
2003	Gangotri	Telugu	
2003	Johnny	Telugu	
2003	Tagore	Telugu	
2004	Anji	Telugu	
2004	Madhyanam Hathya	Telugu	
2004	Gudumba Shankar	Telugu	
2005	Bunny	Telugu	
2006	Lakshmi	Telugu	
2006	Darwaza Bandh Rakho	Hindi	
2006	Stalin	Telugu	
2007	Aata	Telugu	
2007	Shankar Dada Zindabad	Telugu	
2008	Krishna	Telugu	
2008	Premer Kahini	Bengali	
2008	Kotha Bangaru Lokam	Telugu	
2010	Adhurs	Telugu	
2010	Brindavanam	Telugu	
2011	Prema Kavali	Telugu	
2011	Veera	Telugu	
2012	Julayi	Telugu	
2012	Damarukam	Telugu	
2013	Naayak	Telugu	
2013	Ramayya Vasthavayya	Telugu	
2013	Venkatadri Express	Telugu	
2014	Alludu Seenu	Telugu	
2015	Beeruva	Telugu	
2015	Tiger	Telugu	
2016	Dictator	Telugu	
2016	Krishnashtami	Telugu	
2016	Okka Ammayi Thappa	Telugu	
2016	Naanna Nenu Naa Boyfriends	Telugu	
2017	Winner	Telugu	
2017	Jai Lava Kusa	Telugu	
2017	Oxygen	Telugu	
2018	Touch Chesi Chudu	Telugu	
2018	Kavacham	Telugu	
2019	Raju Gari Gadhi 3	Telugu	
2021	Alludu Adhurs	Telugu	
2022	Bimbisara	Telugu	Nominated–SIIMA Award for Best Cinematographer – Telugu
2022	Ginna	Telugu	
2023	Peddha Kapu 1	Telugu	
2026	Vaadala	Telugu	
2026	Vishwambhara	Telugu	

== Awards ==
Filmfare Awards South

- Best Cinematographer (2008) – Kotha Bangaru Lokam
- Best Cinematographer (2012) - Damarukam

Nandi Awards

- Best Cinematographer for Anji – 2004
- Best Cinematographer for Kotha Bangaru Lokam – 2008

== See also ==
- Indian cinematographers
