= Oka Radha Iddaru Krishnula Pelli =

- Directed by: G. Nageswara Reddy
- Written by: Marudhuri Raja (dialogues)
- Screenplay by: G. Nageswara Reddy
- Story by: Janardhana Maharshi
- Produced by: D. V. V. Danayya; J Bhagavan
- Starring: Srikanth; Prabhu Deva; Namitha
- Cinematography: Bhoopati
- Edited by: Gowtam Raju
- Music by: Chakri
- Production company: Sri Balaji Creations
- Release date: 5 September 2003
- Country: India
- Language: Telugu

Oka Radha Iddaru Krishnula Pelli (transl. The wedding of one Radha with two Krishnas) is a 2003 Telugu-language comedy film directed by G. Nageswara Reddy and produced by D. V. V. Danayya and J. Bhagavan under Sri Balaji Creations. The film stars Srikanth, Prabhu Deva and Namitha in the lead roles. The film was remade in Tamil as Enga Raasi Nalla Raasi (2009).

== Cast ==
- Srikanth as Viswam
- Prabhu Deva as Murugan
- Namitha as Sashi Rekha
- Tanikella Bharani
- Chandra Mohan
- Chalapathi Rao
- Sunil as Bala Raju
- Brahmanandam
- M. S. Narayana
- Jaya Prakash Reddy
- L. B. Sriram
- Kovai Sarala
- Delhi Rajeswari
- Melkote
- Ruthika as Pick Pocketer (Special Dance Number)

== Music ==
The music was composed by Chakri.

No.	Song	Lyrics	Singers
1	"Sriramachandra"	Bhaskarabhatla, Ravi Varma	Kousalya, Udit Narayan
2	"Aaku Vakka"	Bhaskarabhatla, Ravi Varma	Chakri, Shreya Ghoshal
3	"Nagunde Kalame"	Paidipalli Srinivas	Kousalya, Shankar Mahadevan
4	"Lavvudoma"	Bhuvanachandra	Kousalya, Sukhvinder Singh
5	"Chilaka Chilaka"	Kandikonda	Kumar Sanu, Shreya Ghoshal
6	"Garam Garam"	Kandikonda	Chakri, Kousalya
