= Amma Rajinama =

- Directed by: Dasari Narayana Rao
- Written by: Dasari Narayana Rao
- Starring: Sharada; Kaikala Satyanarayana; Brahmanandam; Saikumar
- Cinematography: Chota K. Naidu
- Music by: K. Chakravarthy
- Release date: 1991
- Country: India
- Language: Telugu

Amma Rajinama (English translation: Resignation of Mother) is a 1991 Indian Telugu film directed by Dasari Narayana Rao and cinematography by Chota K. Naidu. The Mother character is portrayed by Sharada. This is one of the movies where director Dasari touches upon women issues.

It is a musical film with a film score composed by K. Chakravarthy. "Evaru Rayagalaru Amma Anu Maatakanna Kammani Kavyam" and "Srushitikarta Oka Brahmma…Atanini Srushitinchindoka Amma" are some of the best lyrics written about the greatness of the Mother. This movie also marks the debut of cinematographer Chota K. Naidu, who was an associate and regarded as a student of Dasari Narayana Rao. The movie was remade in Kannada as Amma (2001) starring Lakshmi in the title role.

== Plot ==
The movie shows how a housewife and mother takes care of their children and the entire domestic work, but is unappreciated by her family. She undertakes Rajinama (Resignation) as mother to teach a lesson to her children (Saikumar and Prasad Babu), who eventually understand their mistake.

== Cast ==
- Sharada as Amma (Mother)
- Kaikala Satyanarayana
- Brahmanandam
- Babu Mohan
- Tulasi
- Prasad Babu
- Saikumar
- Kavitha
- Chalapathi Rao
- Dasari Narayana Rao
- Rajitha
- Baby Manasa

== Soundtrack ==
No.	Title	Lyrics	Music	Singer(s)	Length
1.	"Chanubaalu Tagitene"	Sirivennela Sitaramasastri	K. Chakravarthy	S. P. Balasubrahmanyam	3:00
2.	"Yevaru rayagalaru"	Sirivennela Sitaramasastri	K. Chakravarthy	K. S. Chithra	4:07
3.	"Cheekatlo Aadapilla"	Sirivennela Sitaramasastri	K. Chakravarthy	Mano, Minmini	5:10
4.	"Edi Evvaru Evvariki Ivvani Veedukolu"	Sirivennela Sitaramasastri	K. Chakravarthy	S. P. Balasubrahmanyam	4:27
5.	"Srustikartha oka bramha"	Sirivennela Sitaramasastri	K. Chakravarthy	K. J. Yesudas	5:03
