= Maavidaakulu =

- VCD Cover
- Directed by: E.V.V. Satyanarayana
- Written by: Janardhana Maharshi (dialogues)
- Screenplay by: E.V.V. Satyanarayana
- Story by: E.V.V. Satyanarayana; Ramani
- Produced by: J. Bhagavan; D. V. V. Danayya
- Starring: Jagapati Babu; Rachana
- Cinematography: Chota K. Naidu
- Edited by: K. Ravindra Babu
- Music by: Koti
- Production company: Sri Balaji Art Creations
- Release date: 20 March 1998
- Running time: 142 minutes
- Country: India
- Language: Telugu

Maavidaakulu (transl. Our Divorce or Mango Leaves) is a 1998 Telugu-language drama film, produced by J. Bhagavan and D.V.V. Danayya under the Sri Balaji Art Creations banner, directed by E.V.V. Satyanarayana and cinematography by Chota K. Naidu. It stars Jagapati Babu, Rachana and music composed by Koti. This film is Ravi Babu's debut as an artist.

== Plot ==
The film begins with two antagonistic creative heads, Pratap and Priya, of channels AAHA and OOHO, respectively, who are at loggerheads. Both have had their respective marriage end in divorce. Pratap resides with his daughter Puppy and Priya with a son Babloo, who are each fed up with single parents and crave a father & mother. Hence, Pratap & Priya act as their missing parents. Bapineedu, Pratap's ex-father-in-law who aspires to reknit Pratap, shifts them to a single house with a play when love blossoms between them. The rest of the story is about how they get nuptial.

== Cast ==
- Jagapati Babu as Pratap
- Rachana as Priya
- Neelam as Keerti
- Kota Srinivasa Rao as Bapineedu
- Brahmanandam as Lavangam
- Mallikarjuna Rao
- M. S. Narayana as Sundari Mogudu
- Tanikella Bharani as Oho TV owner
- AVS as Aaha TV owner
- Ravi Babu as Muddhu Krishna
- Kavya as Madhuri Dixit
- Namala Murthy
- Priya as anchor
- Ayesha Jalil
- Krishnaveni as Sundari
- Ragini
- Radha Prashanthi as teacher
- Srinija
- Sri Bhavani
- Aanand Vardhan as Babloo
- Baby Upasana as Puppy

== Soundtrack ==
Maavidaakulu

Film score by Koti
- Released: 1998
- Genre: Soundtrack
- Length: 30:09
- Label: Supreme Music
- Producer: Koti

Koti chronology
Gillikajjalu (1998)	Maavidaakulu (1998)	Pavitra Prema (1998)

Music composed by Koti. Music released on Supreme Music Company.

No.	Title	Lyrics	Singer(s)	Length
1.	"Ee Reyi Ee Haayi"	Madhuphala	S. P. Balasubrahmanyam, Chitra	5:14
2.	"Abba Entha Erupo"	Sirivennela Seetharama Sastry	S. P. Balasubrahmanyam, Sunitha	5:03
3.	"Nuvu Kila Kila"	Sirivennela Seetharama Sastry	S. P. Balasubrahmanyam, Sunitha, Saluri Munish, Saluri Madhavi	4:44
4.	"Ammante Thelusuko"	Sirivennela Seetharama Sastry	S. P. Balasubrahmanyam, Chitra	4:49
5.	"Aagadhee Aakali"	Bhuvanachandra	P. Unnikrishnan, Swarnalatha, Malgadi Subha	5:11
6.	"Preminchu Priya"	Bhuvanachandra	Rajesh, Sunitha	5:04
Total length:				30:09
