= Samudram (1999 film) =

- Theatrical release Poster
- Directed by: Krishna Vamsi
- Written by: Story: Krishna Vamsi; Screenplay: Krishna Vamsi; Satyanand; Dialogues: Sobhan
- Produced by: DVV Danayya; J. Bhagavan
- Starring: Jagapati Babu; Sakshi Shivanand; Srihari; Prakash Raj; Ravi Teja
- Cinematography: S. K. A. Bhupathi
- Edited by: Shankar
- Music by: Shashi Preetam
- Production company: Sri Balaji Art Creations
- Release date: 22 October 1999
- Running time: 167 minutes
- Country: India
- Language: Telugu

Samudram (transl. Sea) is a 1999 Indian Telugu-language action film co-written and directed by Krishna Vamsi. It stars Jagapati Babu, Sakshi Shivanand, Srihari, Prakash Raj and Ravi Teja, with music composed by Shashi Preetam. It was produced by J. Bhagavan and D. V. V. Danayya under the Sri Balaji Art Creations banner. The film won three state Nandi Awards.

== Cast ==
- Jagapati Babu as A.K. Sagar
- Sakshi Shivanand as Rajyalakshmi
- Srihari as C.I. Srihari
- Prakash Raj as Constable Nukaraju
- Ravi Teja as Chepala Nani
- Tanikella Bharani as Chepala Krishna
- Prathyusha as Chanti
- Sudha as Sagar's mother
- Sivaji Raja as S.I. Krishnam Raju
- Prudhviraj as Police Officer
- C. V. L. Narasimha Rao as Lawyer
- Devadas Kanakala as Judge
- Rajababu as Rajyalakshmi's father
- Uttej as Sagar's friend
- Delhi Rajeswari as Kanaka Mahalakshmi, Chepala Krishna's wife
- Raasi in an item number

== Soundtrack ==
Samudram

Soundtrack album by Shashi Preetam
- Released: 1999
- Genre: Soundtrack
- Length: 23:58
- Label: Supreme Music
- Producer: Shashi Preetam

Music composed by Shashi Preetam.

No.	Title	Lyrics	Singer(s)	Length
1.	"Soniye"	Sirivennela Sitarama Sastry	Shashi Preetam	5:04
2.	"Muddala Muthayame"	Suddala Ashok Teja	Preethi	5:00
3.	"Deeyo Deeyo"	Sirivennela Sitarama Sastry	Shashi Preetam	4:26
4.	"Laila O Dilaila"	Sirivennela Sitarama Sastry	Sowmya Rao	4:40
5.	"Hoosh Hoosh"	Sirivennela Sitarama Sastry	KK, Malik	4:44
Total length:				23:58

== Production ==
Krishna Vamsi initially developed a subject for actor Nagarjuna and visited Vizag to scout locations for the film. This subject later evolved into Samudram.

== Reception ==
Jeevi of Idlebrain.com wrote, "A best recommended film for those all movie buffs who want to experience the nuances of shot making". In a negative review, a critic from Sify wrote, "Except Srihari in a brief role none have much to offer by way of acting. In fact right from the hero to the villain Bharani, all are victims of a poor script. The musical score by Sasi Preetham is loud. A film worth dumping in the sea".

== Awards ==
Nandi Awards

- Best Villain – Tanikella Bharani
- Best Audiographer – Madhusudhana Reddy
- Best Editor - Shankar
