= Naayak =

2013 Indian film by V. V. Vinayak

- Theatrical release poster
- Directed by: V. V. Vinayak
- Screenplay by: V. V. Vinayak
- Dialogues by: Siva Akula
- Story by: Siva Akula
- Produced by: D. V. V. Danayya; S. Radha Krishna (presenter)
- Starring: Ram Charan; Kajal Aggarwal; Amala Paul
- Cinematography: Chota K. Naidu
- Edited by: Gautham Raju
- Music by: S. Thaman
- Production company: Universal Media
- Release date: January 9, 2013 (India)
- Running time: 160 minutes
- Country: India
- Language: Telugu
- Budget: ₹35 crore

Naayak (transl. Leader) is a 2013 Indian Telugu-language action comedy-drama film directed by V. V. Vinayak who co-wrote the film with Akula Siva. The film was produced by DVV Danayya and presented by S. Radha Krishna under the banner Universal Media. The film stars Ram Charan (in a dual role), Kajal Aggarwal, and Amala Paul in the lead roles. S. Thaman composed the film's score and soundtrack. Chota K. Naidu was the cinematographer and Gautham Raju the film's editor.

Production began on 9 November 2011 and principal photography began on 7 February 2012. The film was extensively shot in Hyderabad and Kolkata, while a couple of the songs were shot in Dubai, Iceland, and Slovenia, making Naayak the first Indian film to be shot in Slovenia. Filming ended on 29 December 2012.

Naayak was released on 9 January 2013 on 1589 screens worldwide, during the season of the Makara Sankranti, where it received generally positive reviews from critics and emerged as the fifth highest-grossing Telugu film of 2013 grossing over ₹84 crore at the box office with a distributors' share of ₹46.5 crore.

== Plot ==
Taxi Seth who was brother of Kolkata-based powerful ex- Crime Boss and Home Minister Rawat with his men are killed by a person named Siddharth Naayak in order to save his men. Rawat orders a CBI officer to catch the fugitive in order to have him executed. Meanwhile, Siddharth's doppelganger Charan alias "Cherry" works as a software engineer in CgTrix, Hyderabad. Cherry's uncle Jilebi, who is the CEO of CgTrix, unexpectedly runs into trouble by angering the local Gangster named Babji. Cherry saves Jilebi from Babji by manipulating him, where he becomes romantically interested in Babji's sister Madhu. After Cherry saves several children from a group of traffickers led by Dassu, Madhu reciprocates his love.

Meanwhile, Siddharth sneaks into the police headquarters and kills the DGP of West Bengal who was Rawat's associate with a gun, where the CBI officer confusingly believes that Cherry killed DGP, although Siddharth is the real culprit. With Jilebi, the CBI officer goes to Kumbh Mela in pursuit of Cherry. As Rawat is offering holy rituals, the CBI officer catches Cherry and holds him, but Siddharth stabs Rawat with a trishul. However, the Officer attacks him with a taser and arrests him, thereby releasing Cherry. Later on the way back, Cherry learns about Siddharth's past.

Past: Siddharth visits his sister's house in Kolkata after passing IIT in Delhi and lives with his sister, brother-in-law and fiancée Nandini. Siddharth's brother-in-law, who is a doctor, attends a case of a minor who was injected with steroids by Rawat's second brother Badvel and then forced into prostitution. When Siddharth's brother-in-law complains to the police, he is unaware that the police officer is in cahoots with Badvel, who later kills him. Enraged in revenge, Siddharth kills Badvel and his men, where he becomes a public sensation overnight.

Rawat, Taxi Seth and their men tries to kill Siddharth, but Siddharth fights them and warns Rawat and Taxi Seth. Siddharth becomes the reigning leader of West Bengal and a terror to Rawat and his partners from Kolkata underworld, where he also seizes Rawat's property and distributes it to the public. Enraged, Rawat kills the Home Minister, and frames on Siddharth with help of DGP, who gets stabbed and thrown into the Ganges. Rawat becomes the Home Minister of Bengal within a week with his influece, while Siddharth survives and pledges to finish Rawat, Taxi Seth and DGP.

Present: After learning the truth, Cherry decides to help him and goes to the CBI prison where Siddharth is in custody. The two hatches a plan to get Siddharth exonerated. Siddharth and Cherry arrive at the court and both starts an argument, leading to some confusion. The judge orders the CBI to find out the real identities of the two persons within 10 days. During that time, Siddharth manages to bring Madhu and her family to Kolkata from Rawat's plan to reveal the truth, thus uniting Cherry and Madhu.

The next day, Rawat calls Siddharth to come to his place by lying him to save the kidnapped school children, but Cherry eavesdrops on the conversation and goes to Rawat's place ahead of Siddharth, where he is severely attacked by Rawat. Siddharth reaches the place after watching a MMS sent by Rawat, where he saves Cherry and finally kills Rawat, with a bomb. The case is dismissed due to lack of evidence, and Siddharth is acquitted. Siddharth and Cherry unite with their respective lovers.

== Cast ==
- Ram Charan in a dual role as:
  - Siddharth Naayak
  - Charan (Cherry)
- Kajal Aggarwal as Madhu, Cherry’s love interest & Babji's sister
- Amala Paul as Nandini, Siddharth's fiancée
- Brahmanandam as Jilebi, Cherry's uncle
- Pradeep Rawat as Home Minister Rawat
- Ashish Vidyarthi as a CBI Officer
- Rahul Dev as Gandipet Babji, madhu's brother
- Jaya Prakash Reddy as Babji's paternal uncle
- Posani Krishna Murali as Shukla Bhai
- Dev Gill as Badvel, Rawat's younger brother
- Kota Srinivasa Rao as Home Minister
- Surekha Vani as Siddharth's sister
- Rajiv Kanakala as Siddharth's brother-in-law
- M. S. Narayana as drunkard CBI officer dubbing specialist
- Raghu Babu as Babji's henchman
- Anandhi as Vinni, Babji's henchman's sister
- Ajaz Khan as Taxi Seth, Rawat's first brother
- Fish Venkat as Babji's henchmen
- Vineet Kumar as Dassu, a trafficking leader in Hyderabad
- Venu Madhav as Venu
- Ahuti Prasad as Rawat's lawyer
- Tanikella Bharani as Judge
- Praveen as Venu's friend
- Satyam Rajesh as Dassu's henchman
- Sravan as Dassu's son
- Sudha as Cherry's mother
- Duvvasi Mohan as doctor
- Raghu Karumanchi as Venu's friend
- Gundu Sudarshan as a College professor
- Charmee Kaur in a special appearance in the song "Nellorae"

== Production ==
=== Development ===
At the end of April 2011, V. V. Vinayak held story discussions for his next film, featuring Ram Charan as the protagonist and written by Akula Siva. By then, Vinayak was busy in giving final touches to his film Badrinath (2011), and Ram Charan was participating in the shooting of Racha (2012), directed by Sampath Nandi. After completing all of the promotional activities for Badrinath, Vinayak and Siva started working on the film's script in early July 2011. DVV Danayya was confirmed to produce the film under the banner Universal Media, and pre-production on the film was expected to be launched in August, followed by filming starting in September 2011. The film's script was approved by Ram Charan's father, and it was announced that actor Chiranjeevi would be part of the cast; Kona Venkat was brought in to assist with the film's screenplay. The project was confirmed in late October 2011. The film was officially launched on 9 November 2011, at Annapurna Studios in Hyderabad.

S. Thaman was announced as the music director, marking his first collaboration with both Vinayak and Charan; Chota K. Naidu and Gautham Raju were announced as the film's cinematographer and editor, respectively. The film's title was announced as Naayak, with the caption "The Leader", on 13 August 2012. Weeks before the film's release, a few Girijan students protested that the term "Naayak" referred to a certain tribal group, and they demanded a change of the title. While censoring the film, the Central Board of Film Certification looked into the group's objection about the title. They found that there was no derogatory reference to either the name Naayak or the caste of tribes, either visually or in the audio part of the film, and cleared the use of the title.

=== Casting ===
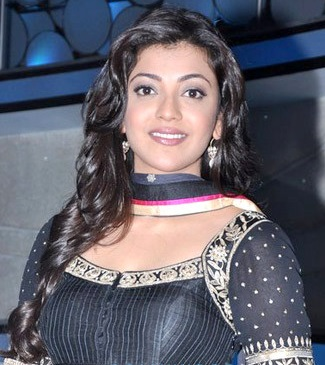
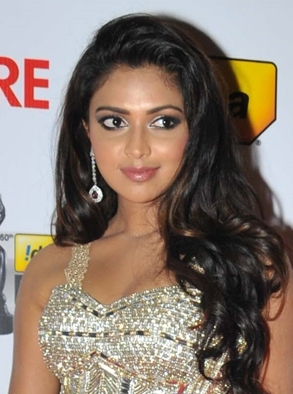
Kajal Aggarwal and Amala Paul, the film's female leads. The latter was reported to be angry that her portions in the film were significantly reduced. Amala later denied those reports saying both of them had equal roles and what was narrated to them was finally shot, adding that she could not promote the film due to her prior commitments at that time.

Kajal Aggarwal was considered for one of the two female leads in the film in early October 2011, later signing on to the film, which marked her second collaboration with Ram Charan after Magadheera (2009). Ram Charan confirmed that he would be seen in a dual role in the film. Hansika Motwani was rumoured as the second female lead, however this was denied by Danayya, who added that she was never considered for that role, and Kajal was the only actress who had been signed up until that point. In late February 2012, Amala Paul was selected as the second female lead, which she confirmed to Sify saying "Mynaa meets Magadheera".

It was reported that Shruti Haasan would perform an item number in the film, which she later denied. Chiranjeevi and N. T. Rama Rao Jr. were rumoured to make cameo appearances in the film. Charmee Kaur confirmed in late December 2012 that she would perform an item number along with Ram Charan. Posani Krishna Murali and Jaya Prakash Reddy were seen in comic roles.

=== Filming ===
Principal photography began on 7 February 2012. By April 2012, the film was shot at various locales in Hyderabad. A few action sequences were shot at night, for which Ram Charan trained for several days; he performed several of the stunt sequences himself without using a body double. Filming was suspended for almost three weeks when Ram Charan was injured during filming Racha (2012). Vinayak intended to complete shooting Ram Charan's solo portions and then start the schedule with Kajal; Ram Charan and Amala Paul would take part in the final part of the planned schedule.

The next portion of the schedule started in Dubai, where a song, "Laila O Laila", with Ram Charan and Kajal was shot. Ram Charan later said "It was a week before my wedding and I had just returned from my bachelor's party. I landed directly in Dubai to shoot the song. I had to wear shades to hide the fatigue" and added "I was told that I wouldn't need much rehearsals, but was zapped when I saw the choreographer take me through the routine. I was like 'can we please slow the beat or something?' I couldn't settle for anything less than the best and went ahead and completed the song in seven days." After its completion, some key scenes and songs were shot in Europe involving the three leads.

Subsequent to the marriage ceremony, Ram Charan resumed his work on Naayak in late June 2012, after shooting for a Tata DoCoMo commercial. The song "Subhalekha Raasukunna" was shot in Iceland on 22 August 2012. It was originally planned to be shot using Ram Charan and Kajal, but it was filmed using Amala Paul instead, as Kajal had a scheduling conflict. After the completion of that song, two more songs were shot using Ram Charan and Kajal. After returning from Iceland, filming continued in the Old City in Hyderabad. On 7 October 2012, scenes featuring Ram Charan and Amala Paul were shot at the Cineplanet Multiplex near Kompally.

The next part of the schedule started in Kolkata from 12 October 2012. Some action episodes involving Ram Charan, Dev Gill, and others, and a few continuity scenes were shot. An entire day was spent shooting a few action episodes with Ram Charan at Chhotelal Ghat near the Mullickghat flower market, since Vinayak insisted on perfection. This portion of the schedule ended on 22 October 2012. The team returned to Hyderabad and filming continued in a set erected at Sarathi Studios. By mid November 2012, a majority of the filming was complete, with final completion expected in December 2012.

The last portion of the schedule began on 4 December 2012, during which the remaining climax action episodes scenes and a song were planned to be shot until 18 December 2012. Amala Paul joined the filming of the climax on 7 December 2012, after returning from the sets of Thalaivaa (2013). The song "Nellorae" was shot using Ram Charan and Charmee at Ramoji Film City on 24 December 2012, and after its completion, filming came to an end on 29 December 2012. The filming phase lasted for approximately 9 months, and the film was the first Indian film to be shot in Slovenia. Ram Charan completed his part of dubbing in late December 2012.

== Themes and influences ==
The film features a protagonist in a dual role, revolving around their lifestyles and the circumstances when they meet. A reviewer from Sify felt that the film's script was inspired from V. V. Vinayak's previous works like Tagore (2003), Lakshmi (2006), Krishna (2008) and Adhurs (2009), as well as from S. S. Rajamouli's past works like Simhadri (2003) and Chhatrapati (2005) and S. Shankar's Tamil film Sivaji (2007).

Akula Siva said that the dialogue in the film had a philosophical touch despite being humorous and added, "The hero is elevated on par with divinity in the introduction; such glorification is imperative, if the hero doesn't have that power and courage he cannot fight so many people".

== Music ==
S. Thaman composed the film's soundtrack and background music, marking his first collaboration with both V. V. Vinayak and Ram Charan. The soundtrack featured six songs with lyrics written by Chandrabose, Veturi Sundararama Murthy, Bhaskarabhatla Ravi Kumar and Sahithi. The song "Subhalekha Rasukunna", originally composed by Ilaiyaraaja for the film Kondaveeti Donga (1990) was remixed for this film. The film's soundtrack, which was marketed by Aditya Music, was launched on 17 December 2012, during a promotional event at Ramanaidu Studios.

== Release ==
Naayak was planned to be released on 12 January 2013, coinciding with Sankranthi weekend. Later the film's release was rumoured to be delayed due to Danayya's financial hardships. although he later confirmed the release date as 9 January 2013, denying the previous reports as rumors. The film was awarded an 'A' certificate by the Central Board of Film Certification on 4 January 2013. Six cuts were suggested by the board to delete politically charged dialogue, and few other lines that included the names of the Andhra Pradesh Governors, A. P. J. Abdul Kalam and Sarvepalli Radhakrishnan. The board also requested a few words being altered in the song "Nellorae", and the display of a statutory warning on drinking and smoking wherever they occur in the film.

The film was shown on 110 screens in Hyderabad, breaking the previous records set by Cameraman Gangatho Rambabu (2012) and Businessman (2012), which were released in 105 and 103 theatres, respectively. Universal Media, in association with Praneeth Media, released the film on more than 100 screens in the United States, including 70 digital prints and sixteen 35 mm prints, which was a first for a Telugu film in an overseas market. The makers said that the film would be released in more than 1200 theatres in Andhra Pradesh.

=== Marketing ===
On the eve of Valentine's Day, first look stills of the film were released to the media. A few stills featuring Ram Charan were unveiled on 18 August 2012, which featured him sporting a new look. Two first look posters, confirming the film's title and its spelling, were unveiled on 26 November 2012. The film's first teaser was unveiled on 14 December 2012. Allu Arjun and S. S. Rajamouli unveiled the trailers at Shilpakala Vedika during the soundtrack launch.

=== Distribution ===
By early November 2012, the film's trade came to an end in all areas except Guntur. Bharath Pictures acquired the film's Nellore distribution rights, while Shobu acquired the rights for the Ceded area (Rayalaseema). Shakti Films acquired the theatrical rights for Krishna district, and Siri Media obtained the film's Nizam region rights. V. Rao, Challa Shankar Rao and Tulasi Films acquired the screening rights in Visakhapatnam, East Godavari district, and West Godavari district. Abhirami Movies acquired the film's Tamil Nadu distribution rights. Errabus acquired the screening rights for the United Kingdom and Europe.

Gayathri Films bought the Karnataka distribution rights for ₹41 million, the highest price offered for any Telugu film in Karnataka up to that time. Universal Media distributed the film in the United States. Producer Dil Raju acquired the film's distribution rights in the Nizam region in mid-December 2012.

=== Dubbed versions ===
The film was dubbed and released in Tamil and Malayalam under the same title and in Hindi as Double Attack (2014).

=== Home media ===
The satellite rights for the Hindi dubbed version were sold for a record price of ₹3.5 crore. Gemini TV paid an advance of ₹2.6 crore for the satellite rights of the original version, and fully acquired them after the film's release for an additional ₹7.5 crore. The DVD and Blu-ray were marketed by Sri Balaji Videos and were released on 3 April 2013.

== Reception ==
=== Box office ===
Naayak grossed ₹11 crore at the worldwide box office on its opening day, and ₹17 crore on its second day, taking its two-day total to ₹28 crore. The film collected a total of ₹29.5 crore in its first week. As of late April 2014, the film stood in fifth place of the top 10 Telugu films with the highest first week gross. In its second week of release, the film's gross suffered due to the competition from the release of Seethamma Vakitlo Sirimalle Chettu, slipping to the second spot in the charts. It witnessed more than a 50% drop in its business, collecting approximately ₹8 crore during the second weekend, and a total of ₹45 crore in 10 days. By the end of its second week, the film had added approximately ₹5.5 crore, for a 16-day total of ₹50.5 crore net. The film grossed ₹82 crore in its lifetime worldwide, and became the third most successful film of 2013, after Attarintiki Daredi and Seethamma Vakitlo Sirimalle Chettu. Its distributor share of ₹46.5 crore made it Ram Charan's third film to cross the ₹40 crore mark. It was fifth on the list of top 10 all-time highest-grossing movies at the Andhra Pradesh box office, as of November 2013. It also ranked tenth on the list of top 20 hit Telugu movies of all time at the box office, as of May 2014.

==== India ====
The film averaged 90% occupancy in both single screens and multiplexes in India on its opening day, collecting ₹8.55 crore at the Andhra Pradesh box office and ₹2.7 crore throughout the rest of India. With an average of 66% across the globe, it collected ₹13.49 crore at the Andhra Pradesh box office, and ₹3.55 crore in the rest of India on its second day. In six days, it collected a total ₹23.46 crore net at Andhra Pradesh box office, and ₹2.5 crore in the rest of India. The film completed a successful 50-day run in several centres across Andhra Pradesh on 27 February 2013. The film collected a distributor share of ₹41 crore net at Andhra Pradesh box office in its lifetime, placing it sixth on the list of all-time highest grossing Telugu films, as of November 2013.

==== Overseas ====
The film collected ₹45 lakh in overseas receipts on its opening day, which increased to ₹65 lakh on its second day. However, the film's trade was severely affected by Seethamma Vakitlo Sirimalle Chettu, dropping 70% at the overseas box office, with a three-day total of ₹92 lakh, compared to Seethamma Vakitlo Sirimalle Chettu 3 day opening day total of ₹1.13 crore. The film collected ₹2.11 crore in six days at the overseas box office. The film did good business by the end of its second weekend at the USA box office, ranking third in the charts by collecting ₹2.53 crore, despite the adverse effect of Seethamma Vakitlo Sirimalle Chettu which was in first place. Matru Ki Bijlee Ka Mandola stood in second place, although its per screen average was lower than that of Naayak. The film suffered a big setback after the release of Race 2 and Vishwaroopam, dropping to sixth place while collecting ₹2.65 crore in 23 days.

=== Critical response ===
The film received positive reviews from critics.

Y. Sunita Chowdary of The Hindu wrote, "... the writing is humorous, lively and consistent. What more, the film works mainly on its dialogues and a brisk screenplay and has all the potential to rake in moolah at the box office," and added, "Vinayak, having read the pulse well, comes out with Naayak that is a throwback to many of his earlier films but with correct dose of humour added, to cover the flaws. By the time you sense something wrong, he cleverly comes up with another funny scene. This way the film progresses and winds up before it gets too heavy, and voila there are smiles everywhere". Mahalakshmi Prabhakaran of Daily News and Analysis wrote, "We’ll say that even if the film is about the age-old formula of the hero bashing the bad guys and coming up trumps, Naayak is an entertaining film that you won’t regret watching," and rated the film 3.5 out of 5. AS Sashidhar of The Times of India termed the film a "pot boiling paisa vasool entertainer" and rated the film 3.5 out of 5. Radhika Rajamani of Rediff.com wrote, "The first half of the film moves at a breezy pace while the interval brings in the twist. In the second half there's mostly stomach-churning violence which is pretty repulsive. Technically the film is top-notch. V V Vinayak delivers a hardcore commercial entertainer for the festival. If you can watch Naayak without analysing it, you will find it fun," and rated the film 3 out of 5.

In contrast, a reviewer from Sify stated, "Director V V Vinayak, has chosen a routine story which has nothing new to offer. He chose a simple story and weaved an entertaining screenplay around it. Vinayak concentrated more on the presentation of the movie rather than the subject. The story and screenplay is predictable after the interesting interval bang" and called the film "Average". Another reviewer from Sify rated the film 3 out of 5 and stated, "Nayak, a regular commercial potboiler, starts off as a regular mass movie and ends up the same way. Nayak team should have concentrated on the story more. A rehashed film that can be watched once". B. V. S. Prakash of Deccan Chronicle wrote, "Even though Ram Charan impresses in the role of a brooding young IT employee who is determined to smash evil forces, the final outcome is more comic than serious. Vinayak tends to repackage scenes from his earlier movies. Akula Siva pens strong punch lines to enthral Ram Charan fans".

== Accolades ==
Ceremony	Category	Nominee	Result	Ref(s)
61st Filmfare Awards South	Best Actor	Ram Charan	Nominated	
61st Filmfare Awards South	Best Female Playback Singer	Shreya Ghoshal for "Hey Naayak"	Nominated	
3rd South Indian International Movie Awards	Best Actor	Ram Charan	Nominated	
3rd South Indian International Movie Awards	Best Director	V. V. Vinayak	Nominated	
3rd South Indian International Movie Awards	Best Music Director	S. Thaman	Nominated	
3rd South Indian International Movie Awards	Best Female Playback Singer	Shreya Ghoshal for "Hey Naayak"	Nominated	
3rd South Indian International Movie Awards	Best Comedian	Posani Krishna Murali	Nominated	
3rd South Indian International Movie Awards	Best Cinematographer	Chota K. Naidu	Nominated	
3rd South Indian International Movie Awards	Best Actor in a Negative role	Pradeep Rawat	Nominated	
3rd South Indian International Movie Awards	Best Fight Choreographer	Kanal Kannan & Stunt Silva	Nominated	
3rd South Indian International Movie Awards	Best Dance Choreographer	Johnny for "Laila O Laila"	Won	
TSR – TV9 National Film Awards	Best Actor	Ram Charan	Won	
