= D. V. V. Danayya =

Indian film producer (born 1961)

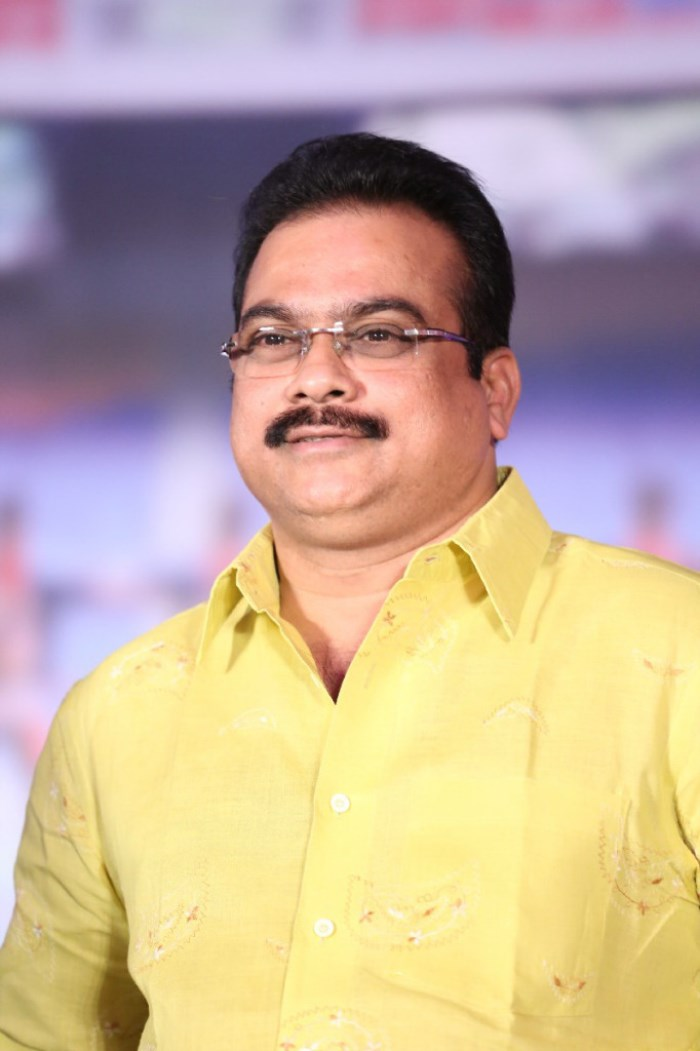
- Danayya
- Born: Dasari Veera Venkata Danayya; 1 April 1961 (age 65); Tallapudi, Andhra Pradesh, India
- Occupation: Film producer
- Years active: 1992–present
- Children: Kalyan Dasari, Jahnavi Dasari

Dasari Veera Venkata Danayya (born 1 April 1961), popularly known as D. V. V. Danayya, is an Indian film producer who works in Telugu cinema. In a career spanning three decades, he has produced more than 20 films.

Danayya started his career by co-producing the fantasy comedy film Jamba Lakidi Pamba in 1992. His filmography as producer/presenter includes films like Samudram (1999), Manasunna Maaraju (2000), Sivamani (2003), Desamuduru (2007), Dubai Seenu (2007), Krishna (2008), Oy! (2009), Julayi (2012), Naayak (2013), Ninnu Kori (2017), Bharat Ane Nenu (2018) and RRR (2022).

RRR is the most expensive Indian film at its time of release and is the third highest grossing Indian film of all time. RRR has received various international accolades including an Academy Award, a Golden Globe and two Critics' Choice Movie Awards.

== Early life ==
Danayya hails from Tallapudi near Kovvur in West Godavari district, Andhra Pradesh. He was fascinated by films right from his childhood. Films such as Padipantalu (1976) and Meghasandesam (1982) were shot in the region. Watching the shooting of these films attracted him towards cinema. His parents were against the idea of him joining the film industry.

== Career ==
After his marriage, he shifted to Madras (now Chennai) against everyone's advice and joined the team of Jandhyala. He worked with Jandhyala on Rendu Rellu Aaru (1986). Later, he started working in the production department in the film industry.

Danayya became close friends with E. V. V. Satyanarayana while working with him in several films. When EVV became a director, Danayya collaborated with him and co-produced a fantasy comedy film under E. V. V.'s direction titled Jamba Lakidi Pamba (1993). The film explores feminism and women's rights in a satirical manner and depicts the consequences when the male and female genders are reversed. It became a super hit at the box office.

He later made Maavidaakulu (1998) with E. V. V. Satyanarayana which became an average grosser. His next film was Samudram (1999) under Krishna Vamsi's direction which was also an average grosser. In 2000, he remade the Malayalam film Kottaram Veettile Apputtan (1998) as Manasunna Maaraju (2000) with Muthyala Subbaiah as director. It became a commercial success. His next film was Seema Simham (2002) starring Balakrishna and the film was a flop at the box office. In 2003, he remade the Tamil film Thulluvadho Ilamai (2002) in Telugu as Juniors (2003) starring Allari Naresh. The film bombed at the box office. His next film Oka Radha Iddaru Krishnula Pelli (2003) was a commercial success at the box office.

He also presented Sivamani (2003) produced and directed by Puri Jagannadh that became a commercial success. His next venture was Desamuduru (2007) under the direction of Puri Jagannadh and starring Allu Arjun in the lead role. It became a blockbuster and was one of the highest grossing Telugu films of 2007. Later, he made successful films like Dubai Seenu (2007), Krishna (2008), Oy! (2009), Julayi (2012), Naayak (2013), Ninnu Kori (2017), Bharat Ane Nenu (2018) and RRR (2022).

RRR is the most expensive Indian film of its time and is the third highest grossing Indian film of all time. It has been nominated in three categories at the 47th Saturn Awards including Best Action / Adventure Film and Best International Film.

== Filmography ==
Key
†	Denotes films that have not yet been released

Year	Title	Producer	Notes
1992	Jamba Lakidi Pamba	Yes	
1998	Maavidaakulu	Yes	
1999	Samudram	Yes	
2000	Manasunna Maaraju	Yes	
2002	Seema Simham	Yes	
2003	Juniors	Yes	
2003	Oka Radha Iddaru Krishnula Pelli	Yes	
2003	Sivamani	Presenter	
2007	Desamuduru	Yes	Nominated–Filmfare Award for Best Film – Telugu
2007	Dubai Seenu	Yes	
2008	Krishna	Presenter	
2008	Neninthe	Yes	
2009	Oy!	Yes	
2010	Varudu	Yes	
2012	Julayi	Presenter	
2012	Cameraman Gangatho Rambabu	Yes	
2013	Naayak	Yes	
2015	Bruce Lee	Yes	
2017	Ninnu Kori	Yes	
2018	Bharat Ane Nenu	Yes	Nominated–Filmfare Award for Best Film – Telugu; Nominated–SIIMA Award for Best Film – Telugu
2019	Vinaya Vidheya Rama	Yes	
2022	RRR	Yes	Filmfare Award for Best Film – Telugu; National Film Award for Best Popular Film Providing Wholesome Entertainment; Nominated–SIIMA Award for Best Film – Telugu
2024	Saripodhaa Sanivaaram	Yes	
2025	They Call Him OG	Yes	
