= Tallapudi =

- Village
- Interactive map of Tallapudi
- Location in Andhra Pradesh, India
- Coordinates: 17.07°N 81.39°E
- Country: India
- State: Andhra Pradesh
- District: East Godavari
- Talukas: Tallapudi Mandal

Population (2011)
  - Total: 4,411

Languages
  - Official: Telugu
- Time zone: UTC+5:30 (IST)
- PIN: 534341
- Telephone code: 08813
- Vehicle registration: AP
- Distance from Hyderabad: 400 kilometres (250 mi) (Road)
- Distance from Vizag: 250 kilometres (160 mi) (Road)

Tallapudi is a village in the East Godavari district of Andhra Pradesh, India. It is also headquarter of Tallapudi mandal. It is situated on the banks of the Godavari River, approximately 22 km from Rajahmundry and 14 km from Kovvur. Tallapudi serves as a commercial and service center for several surrounding villages.

The town is known for its scenic riverfront, surrounding greenery, and peaceful ghats along the Godavari River, which have made it a preferred location for Telugu cinema sets. Agriculture is a primary economic activity, with paddy and sugarcane being the major crops, and the region is noted for high agricultural productivity. Industrial development has also been emerging, including a paper manufacturing unit established by Whitefield Paper Mills Ltd.. Tallapudi is also well known for hosting Godavari Pushkaram, a major religious festival held once every twelve years.

== Demographics ==
According to Indian census, 2011, the demographic details of Tallapudi village is as follows:

- Total Population: 4,411 in 1,151 Households
- Male Population: 2,242 and Female Population: 2,169
- Children Under 6-years of age: 480 (Boys 247 and Girls - 233)
- Total Literates: 3,337

== Education ==
There are many private and public educational institutions in Tallapudi.

- Zilla Parishad High School.
- Government Junior College.
- Karibandi Memorial (College).
- Montessori E.M. High School
- Hamsa Vahini School
- Swamy Vivekananda E.M.Convent

Many other educational institutions are available in accessible distance. Bus facilities are also available to the schools/colleges situated in nearby places like Rajahmundry, Kovvur, Polavaram.

== Attractions ==
Despite its small size, Tallapudi is situated close to a number of natural and scenic attractions.

- Papi Hills is a tribal area with a peaceful atmosphere and pleasant surroundings, which attract visitors.
- Godavari ghats offer a panoramic view of the river. The ghats are crowded with people, especially on holy days such as *Sravana Sukravaram* (Friday) and *Kaarthika Somavaram* (Monday). People from many places come for a holy bath during festive seasons.
- One of the popular tourist spots near Tallapudi is Pattiseema, which is located about 8 km from Tallapudi. Pattiseema is famous for its historic Shiva temple. A boat journey to Pattiseema and *Papi Kondalu* is a memorable experience for visitors.

== Notable Personalities ==
- D. V. V. Danayya - Indian film producer, best known for producing the Telugu-language epic film RRR (2022).
- J.Bhagavan [Film Producer]
- Bulli Raju Mullapudi/Bangaru Raju Yaganti [First Oil distributors in Tallapudi Mandal]
- Thota Sreenivas (Kenya Cricket Team Official, Kenya)
- Dr. Gorugantu SVSS Subrahmanyam, LL.B, MA, PhD [Zonal Manager, Kadevi Industries Ltd, HYD]
- Satya, Former TV9 News Reporter .

== Panchayats ==
The following is the list of village panchayats in Tallapudi mandal.

- Annadevarapeta
- Vegeswarapuram
- Ballipadu
- Pydimetta
- Prakkilanka
- Gajjaram
- Pochavaram
- Peddevam
- Malakapalli
- Tadipudi
- Ragolapalli

== Transport ==
Tallapudi is well connected by road and can be accessed easily from nearby towns and cities in Andhra Pradesh.

=== By Road ===
Tallapudi is connected by state highways and local roads to major nearby towns. It is located approximately 22 km from Rajahmundry and about 14 km from Kovvur. Regular bus services operated by the Andhra Pradesh State Road Transport Corporation (APSRTC) connect Tallapudi with Rajahmundry, Kovvur and other surrounding places.

=== By Rail ===
The nearest major railway stations are:

- Rajahmundry railway station – approximately 22 km away, an important junction on the Howrah–Chennai main line
- Kovvur railway station – approximately 14 km away

Both stations are well connected to major cities such as Visakhapatnam, Vijayawada, Chennai, Hyderabad, and Bengaluru.

=== By Air ===
The nearest airport is Rajahmundry Airport, located about 32 km from Tallapudi. Other nearby airports include Vijayawada Airport and Alluri Sitarama Raju International Airport, both of which provide domestic and limited international connectivity.
