= Julayi =

2012 Indian film by Trivikram Srinivas

- Theatrical release poster
- Directed by: Trivikram Srinivas
- Written by: Trivikram Srinivas
- Produced by: S. Radha Krishna; D. V. V. Danayya (presenter)
- Starring: Allu Arjun; Ileana D'Cruz; Sonu Sood
- Cinematography: Chota K. Naidu; Shyam K. Naidu
- Edited by: Prawin Pudi
- Music by: Devi Sri Prasad
- Production company: Haarika & Hassine Creations
- Distributed by: Siri Media; Ficus Inc
- Release date: 9 August 2012
- Running time: 152 minutes
- Country: India
- Language: Telugu

Julayi (transl. Vagabond) is a 2012 Indian Telugu-language action comedy thriller film written & directed by Trivikram Srinivas and produced by S. Radha Krishna under Haarika & Hassine Creations banner. The film stars Allu Arjun and Sonu Sood, alongside Ileana D'Cruz, Rajendra Prasad, Rao Ramesh, Kota Srinivasa Rao, Brahmaji, Tanikella Bharani and Sheetal Menon. The music was composed by Devi Sri Prasad, while cinematography and editing were handled by Chota K. Naidu-Shyam K. Naidu and Prawin Pudi.

Julayi was released worldwide on 8 August 2012 to positive reviews from critics. The film collected a distributor share of over ₹40 crore and grossed roughly ₹70 crore in its lifetime making it one highest grossing Telugu films of 2012. The film has garnered the Nandi Award for Best Popular Feature Film. It was remade into Tamil as Saagasam.

== Plot ==
In Visakhapatnam, Ravindra "Ravi" Narayan, an intelligent yet lazy youth who prefers quick money over hard work, crosses paths with Bittu, a mastermind robber planning to steal ₹1,500 crores from a bank alongside corrupt MLA Varadarajulu. After Ravi inadvertently discloses information about an illegal betting ring to Bittu during their encounter, police raid the ring. During questioning by ACP Raja Manikyam, Ravi deduces that Bittu used the betting burst as a distraction to execute his bank heist. Police interrupt Bittu's brother Lala during the robbery; Lala dies in the ensuing struggle with Ravi. Meanwhile, when Bittu arrives at the designated dumping yard to retrieve the stolen cash, he finds the money burnt to ashes, prompting him to swear vengeance against Ravi.

For his safety, Manikyam fakes Ravi's death and places him under witness protection in Hyderabad at DIG Sitaram's residence. There, Ravi falls in love with Madhu, a travel agent associate unknowingly tied to Travel Murthy, Bittu's contact for forged passports. Bittu abducts Madhu as per Murthy's advice to use her to leave the country, prompting Ravi to track him down and rescue Madhu.

Vengeful, Bittu tracks Ravi down and orchestrates a series of retaliatory strikes. He assassinates Manikyam with a car bomb, attacks Ravi's family, and kidnaps his sister Raji. After the attack, Ravi's father Narayana Moorthy emphasises the importance of earning through hard work and advises Ravi to mend his ideology. A reformed Ravi resolves to bring Bittu down and recover the stolen public funds.

Ravi discovers that Manikyam and Varadarajulu had secretly swapped the stolen bank reserves with counterfeit currency at the dumping yard, burning the fake notes to deceive Bittu, and that Manikyam had faked his death by bombing his car. Bittu uncovers the conspiracy and executes both Manikyam and Varadarajulu. He loads the real cash into a shipping container to flee the country. Intercepting the shipment with Sitaram's aid, Ravi tricks Bittu's gang into returning the container directly to the bank, restoring the stolen funds to the public.

Following a final duel, Ravi kills Bittu and rescues Raji. Choosing an honest life, Ravi successfully completes a job interview and earns an honourable living.

== Cast ==
- Allu Arjun as Ravindra Narayan "Ravi"
- Ileana D'Cruz as Madhu, Ravi's love interest (voice dubbed by Haritha)
- Sonu Sood as Bittu (voice dubbed by P. Ravi Shankar)
- Rajendra Prasad as DIG Sitaram IPS
- Kota Srinivasa Rao as MLA Varadarajulu
- Rao Ramesh as ADGP Raja Manikyam IPS
- Tanikella Bharani as Narayana Murthy, Ravi's father
- Sheetal Menon as Devayani, Bittu's deaf-mute girlfriend
- Shafi as Lala, Bittu's brother
- M. S. Narayana as SI Valmiki
- Brahmanandam as "Pickpocket" Bhramam, Sitaram's servant
- Brahmaji as "Travel" Murthy, Madhu's boss
- Dharmavarapu Subramanyam as Madhu's father
- Tulasi as Kameswari, Ravi's mother
- Hema as Sujata, Madhu's step-mother
- Pragathi as Lalita, Sitaram's wife
- Sreemukhi as Raji, Ravi's sister
- Ravi Prakash as Dhanushkoti, Bittu's trusted aid
- Pradeep Machiraju as Ravi's friend working in FM studio
- Saptagiri as Giri, Ravi's friend
- Amit Tiwari as Bittu's henchman
- Vamsi Krishna as Bittu's henchman
- Posani Krishna Murali as a club owner
- Gautam Raju as a police constable
- Sivannarayana Naripeddi as a tea seller
- Kalpika Ganesh as Neha, Sitram's elder daughter
- Shravan as Sattar
- Ananth Prabhu as SI Prabhu
- Vennela Kishore as a deaf customer in cafe
- Raghu Babu as customer in a bar
- Ananth Babu as a priest
- Ali as a bus passenger
- Dhanraj as a patient in a hospital
- Rajitha as Ravi's neighbor
- Sunny as a thief
- Vajja Venkata Giridhar as a bike guy
- Udaya Bhanu in the song "Julayi"
- Raju Sundaram cameo appearance in the song "Osey Osey"
- Prakash Raj (voiceover)

== Production ==
=== Development ===
In 2010 after his film Khaleja was released, many reports suggested that Trivikram Srinivas would work with Venkatesh for his next film. It was reported that the film would start filming in early 2011, but for unknown reasons, the project was unable to take off. In March 2011, reports suggested that Trivikram Srinivas had approached Allu Arjun for a film and that Allu Arjun has accepted the offer. It was reported that DVV Danayya would produce the film under Universal Media banner. DVV Danayya previously made the successful film Desamuduru with Allu Arjun. It was also reported that Ileana D'Cruz was cast as the female lead and the filming would begin in May 2011. Although there were several reports on when the filming would begin, all proved untrue. In August 2011, it was reported that Allu Arjun has injured his shoulder and went to Australia for surgery on Trivikram's request. This caused the project to be further delayed. In September 2011, an official statement was released by the producers stating that as Allu Arjun was in Australia for shoulder surgery, the filming would start in late October 2011. It was also announced that the film is being produced by S. Radha Krishna under Haarika & Hassine Creations banner and with DVV Danayya presenting the film. It was also announced that Devi Sri Prasad who had previously worked with Allu Arjun and Trivikram Srinivas would score the music. It was reported that Allu Arjun, as well as Trivikram, had slashed their remuneration for the film in a bid to bring the production cost down. On 2 November 2011 after months of getting delayed, the film was officially launched. It was announced that Ileana D'Cruz was cast as the female lead and the other cast and crew was also announced. On 14 November 2011, filming began in Hyderabad. Although there were many reports that the film was titled as Honey, the director dismissed the reports saying that no decision was taken. In March 2012, it was announced that the film was titled as Julayi.

=== Casting ===
It was announced in September 2011 that Rajendra Prasad was cast for a vital role in the film. It was later reported that Rajendra Prasad would be playing the role of a cop in the film. at first Trivikram wanted to cast Sudeep as a villain, but due to Sudeep's busy schedule, Trivikram later cast Sonu Sood as the antagonist in the film. The other cast includes popular Telugu actors like Kota Srinivasa Rao, Brahmanandam, Tanikella Bharani, M. S. Narayana, Dharmavarapu Subramanyam, Brahmaji and Rao Ramesh. It was reported that Mahesh Babu would provide voice over for the film similar to Trivikram's Jalsa, but it proved to be untrue. It was reported that Udaya Bhanu would feature in an item number.

=== Filming ===
After months of delay, filming began in Hyderabad on 14 November 2011. The scenes between Brahmanandam and Ileana at a hospital in Kukatpally were canned during the first schedule of filming. The second schedule of filming began on 13 December 2011. Filming took place at Ramoji Film City and Sivarla in Hyderabad. In January 2012, action scenes in shivering cold weather were canned at RFC under the supervision of Peter Hein. In February 2012, bank robbery scenes were shot on Allu Arjun and Sonu Sood in Hyderabad. Also in February 2012, more action scenes on Allu Arjun were canned at Chennai Port under Peter Hein's supervision. In March 2012, filming took place in Visakhapatnam, Andhra pradesh. On 6 April 2012, it was reported that filming of the entire talkie part has been completed and four songs are yet to be canned. On 20 April 2012 it was reported that the production unit would be travelling to Dubai on 26 April 2012 to film two songs on the lead pair and the remaining two songs would be shot in India. On 9 June 2012 fire broke out in a special Irani Hotel set, that was erected for the film in Ramoji Film City. Allu Arjun and Brahmaji suffered minor injuries in this accident.

== Music ==
The soundtrack album was composed by Devi Sri Prasad. The audio of the film was released on 6 July 2012 through Aditya Music and the lyrics for three songs were written by Srimani, two songs by Ramajogayya Sastry and one song by Devi Sri Prasad. The audio launch event took place at the Hitex Exhibition center in Madhapur on the same day. The audio was a huge success with receiving a positive reception from critics and audience. Musicperk.com, a famous music site, marked Julai as one of the top 10 albums in 2012 rating it 9/10.

== Release ==
=== Pre-release business ===
Julayi Pre-release business
Territories and ancillary revenues	Price
AP Distribution rights (Siri Media)	₹23 crore (US$2.4 million)
Satellite rights with a TV channel	₹5.7 crore (US$590,000)
Overseas & home video rights with Ficus & Volga	₹3.5 crore (US$360,000)
Music rights (Aditya Music)	₹0.7 crore (US$73,000)
Karnataka rights with RNR Films	₹3 crore (US$310,000)
Kerala distribution rights	₹1.2 crore (US$120,000)
Total	₹37.1 crore (US$3.9 million)

In February 2012, it was announced that Telugu film director and producer Dasari Narayana Rao has bought the Andhra Pradesh distribution rights of the film for an amount of ₹23 crore (US$2.4 million). It was also reported that Dasari Narayana Rao will release the film under Siri Media. It was reported that it was the highest amount ever paid for an Allu Arjun film. It was reported in April 2012 that Ficus had acquired the overseas theatrical distribution rights of the film excluding Singapore and Malaysia. In July 2012, it was reported that the satellite rights were sold for ₹5.7 crore (US$590,000) to Star Maa. Kerala distribution rights were sold for ₹1.2 crore (US$120,000) which is a record in terms of Telugu and Tamil films.

=== Theatrical ===
The film was released worldwide on over 1600 screens on 8 August 2012. It is the biggest release of Allu Arjun's career Gajapokkiri The Black Prince, the Malayalam dubbed version of the film was released on 17 August 2012. The film was also dubbed and released in Hindi as Dangerous Khiladi in 2013.

== Reception ==
=== Box office ===
Julayi collected ₹8.5 crore (US$880,000) nett at AP box office on its first day. The film collected ₹32 crore (US$3.3 million) nett at AP box office on its first week. Julayi collected ₹7.54 crore (US$780,000) nett share in rest of India and overseas on its first week and ₹3.5 crore (US$360,000) nett at overseas in eight day, extended first week.

Julayi opened very well overseas and collected more than $1 million. In USA, the film collected more than $600,000 including premiere shows in its first weekend. Taran Adarsh of Bollywood Hungama reported that Julayi has collected over $569,436 (Rs. 3.15 crore) over the weekend in US with the per screen average for the film being around $12,379.

With Julayi, Allu Arjun became the fourth Telugu actor whose film collected a distributor share ₹47.9 crore (US$5.0 million) at the box office. The film has completed 50 days on 27 September 2012. Julayi got pre-release revenue's up to ₹37.2 crore (US$3.9 million) making table profits to the producer.

=== Critical response ===
Julayi received positive reviews from critics.

Riya Chakravarty of NDTV wrote, "Overall, the movie caters to all ages. Watch the movie for its witty dialogues and energetic performances." Sangeetha Devi Dundoo of The Hindu described the film as "high on energy and wit" and commented that "Julayi has all the staple ingredients that characterise a Telugu masala entertainer" and concluded that "brain matches brawn in this masala entertainer."

Karthik Pasupulate of The Times of India gave 3/5 stars and wrote "The movie has enough in it for Allu Arjun fans to dig into it, the others might not find it as amusing." Pavithra Srinivasan of Rediff criticised the film and felt it to be a "no brainer which loses steam because of the glaring lack of logic" and "gaping plot-holes." She lauded Allu Arjun for "carrying the film on his capable shoulders, hurling punches (both verbal and physical), bashing up goons and going gaga for his girl." CNN-IBN declared it as "lackluster" and noted that the film was "more amusing than intelligent". It also felt that the film is "far from being either a romance/laugh riot."

== Accolades ==
Ceremony	Category	Nominee	Result
Nandi Awards of 2012	Best Popular Feature Film	S. Radha Krishna	Won
Nandi Awards of 2012	Best Male Dubbing Artist	P. Ravi Shankar	Won
Nandi Awards of 2012	Nandi Award for Best Choreographer	Jani Master - "Mee Intiki Mundhu Gatu"	Won
2nd South Indian International Movie Awards	Best Film (Telugu)	S. Radha Krishna, D.V.V. Danayya	Nominated
2nd South Indian International Movie Awards	Best Director (Telugu)	Trivikram Srinivas	Nominated
2nd South Indian International Movie Awards	Best Actor (Telugu)	Allu Arjun	Nominated
2nd South Indian International Movie Awards	Best Supporting Actor (Telugu)	Rajendra Prasad	Won
2nd South Indian International Movie Awards	Best Actor in a Negative Role (Telugu)	Sonu Sood	Nominated
2nd South Indian International Movie Awards	Best Comedian (Telugu)	Brahmanandam	Nominated
2nd South Indian International Movie Awards	Best Music Director (Telugu)	Devi Sri Prasad	Nominated
2nd South Indian International Movie Awards	Best Lyricist (Telugu)	Devi Sri Prasad - "O Madhu"	Nominated
2nd South Indian International Movie Awards	Best Male Playback Singer (Telugu)	Adnan Sami - "O Madhu"	Nominated
2nd South Indian International Movie Awards	Best Fight Choreographer	Peter Hein	Nominated
2nd South Indian International Movie Awards	Best Dance Choreographer	Sekhar - "Julai"	Won
