= Dubai Seenu =

2007 Telugu film directed by Srinu Vaitla

- Film poster
- Directed by: Srinu Vaitla
- Written by: Srinu Vaitla; Gopimohan
- Dialogues by: Chintapalli Ramana
- Produced by: D. V. V. Danayya
- Starring: Ravi Teja; Nayanthara
- Cinematography: Bharani K. Dharan
- Edited by: M. R. Varma
- Music by: Mani Sharma
- Production company: Universal Media
- Release date: 8 June 2007
- Country: India
- Language: Telugu
- Box office: ₹13 crore distributors' share

Dubai Seenu is a 2007 Indian Telugu-language action comedy film directed by Srinu Vaitla and produced by D. V. V. Danayya. It stars Ravi Teja and Nayanthara, with music composed by Mani Sharma. The film follows Srinivas, known as Dubai Seenu, who aspires to make it big in Dubai but is deceived in Mumbai, forcing him to start a Pav Bhaji centre. His life takes an unexpected turn when he falls for a radio jockey searching for her brother and becomes entangled in a dangerous confrontation.

The film was released on 8 June 2007 and opened with nearly 250 prints. It received positive reviews and marked a commercial success for Ravi Teja following the failure of Khatarnak (2006). Several comedy scenes from the film have gained cult status and are frequently referenced in Telugu internet culture and meme pages. It was later remade in Kannada as Dubai Babu (2009).

== Plot ==
Srinivas (Ravi Teja) is popular in his village as Dubai Seenu. He dreams of seeking his fortune in Dubai. Seenu and his friends reach Mumbai but unfortunately, get cheated by a fraudster Tataji (Venu Madhav) because of Ramki alias Rama Krishna (Brahmanandam). After realizing that they were cheated, the friends start a Pav Bhaji center with the help of Patnaik (Krishna Bhagavaan), who is also a fraudster.

Madhumati (Nayanthara), who was working as an RJ, goes to Mumbai in search of her brother. Seenu meets Madhu on a local train and falls in love. Luckily, she surfaces right before his Pav Bhaji center. Seenu dares to propose his love, but Madhu does not reply and disappears. While Seenu was in search of Madhu, he meets Chakri (J. D. Chakravarthy). Seenu helps Chakri, who was in love with Puja (Neha Bamb), and gets them married. Chakri and Puja promise Seenu to help him go to Dubai and make all arrangements. They, too, plan to return to Hyderabad to repay the loan borrowed by Chakri's father for his education. Just before leaving the office, Chakri and Puja find that their boss is none other than Jinnah Bhai (Sushant Singh) the most wanted mafia don in India.

Finding that the couple recognized him, Jinnah and his brother kill Chakri and Puja right before Seenu. Before his death, Chakri reveals to Seenu that Madhu is his sister. Seenu returns to Hyderabad, where he meets Madhu and pays off her debt. When she asks how he got the money, he reveals that it is her brother's money. Madhu's uncle Babji (Sayaji Shinde) also wants to marry her. In the end, Seenu kills Jinnah and his henchmen and marries Madhu.

== Cast ==
- Ravi Teja as Srinivas aka Seenu
- Nayanthara as Madhumati
- J. D. Chakravarthy as Chakri
- Sushant Singh as Jinnah Bhai(voice by P Ravi Shankar)
- Brahmanandam as Ramakrishna "Ramki"
- Sunil as Seenu's cousin
- Neha Bamb as Pooja
- Bhanu Chander as DCP Diwakar
- Sayaji Shinde as Panjagutta Circle Inspector Babji
- Raghu Babu as Panjagutta Constable Durga
- Krishna Bhagavaan as Patnaik
- Venu Madhav as Tataji/Netaji (Bommakanti Nagalingam)
- Srinivasa Reddy as Suribabu
- Chitram Srinu as Ramana
- Surekha Vani as Dinesh's wife and Seenu's sister
- Mallikarjuna Rao as 9 to 9 Shastri
- Fish Venkat as Jinnah's henchman
- Master Bharath as Seenu's nephew
- Sarika Ramachandra Rao as Ramachandra
- C. V. L. Narasimha Rao as Madhumati and Chakri's father
- Giridhar as Seenu's friend
- Ramachandra as Bujji
- Telangana Shakuntala as Grandma
- Allari Subhashini as Director of Women's Association
- Gautam Raju as TV9 reporter
- Srinu Vaitla in a special appearance
- Japan Kumar in a special appearance in "Suppanathi"

== Music ==
Music was composed by Mani Sharma. Lyrics were written by Ramajogayya Sastry and Sahithi.

Track listing
No.	Title	Lyrics	Singer(s)	Length
1.	"Once Upon"	Ramajogayya Sastry	Karthik, Rita
2.	"Diwali Holi"	Ramajogayya Sastry	Deepu, Karunya, Kausalya
3.	"Kol Kol"	Sahithi	Ranjith, Saindhavi
4.	"Seenu Seenu"	Ramajogayya Sastry	Naveen
5.	"Kanya Raasi"	Ramajogayya Sastry	Vijay Yesudas, Suchitra
6.	"Suppanathi"	Ramajogayya Sastry	Manikya Vinayagam, Anuradha Sriram

== Critical reception ==
The film was well received by both audience and critics. The Hindu wrote, "Yes, there are blemishes in the screenplay but in a movie like this, one is really not supposed to bother about them as logic (Dubai Seenu never visits Dubai) is never the motive!" Idlebrain wrote, "On a while it's a time pass film if you are looking for Ravi Teja kind of comedy".

== Box-office performance ==
The movie has earned ₹10.73 crore rupees in its opening week and ₹15.89 crore rupees by the end of the second week, giving a strong competition with Sivaji (2007), a Rajinikanth starrer. Considering its budget of ₹9 crore, it was declared a super hit. It brought Ravi Teja, depressed after the failure of Khatarnak, a great joy and was released with nearly 250 prints.
