= V. V. Vinayak =

Indian filmmaker

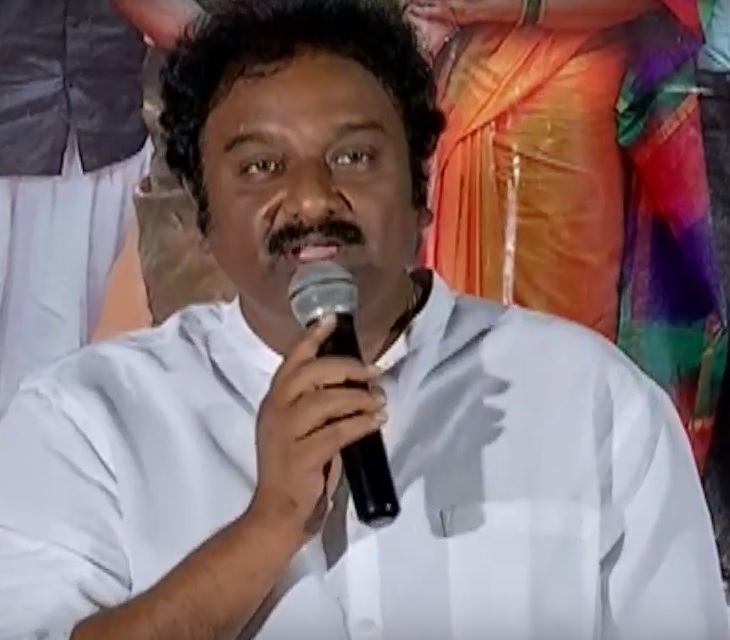
- Vinayak at the teaser trailer launch event of Ammammagarillu in 2018.
- Born: Gandrothu Veera Venkata Vinayaka Rao; 9 October 1974 (age 52); Chagallu, Andhra Pradesh, India
- Occupations: Film director; screenwriter

Gandrothu Veera Venkata Vinayaka Rao, better known as V. V. Vinayak (born 9 October 1974), is an Indian film director and screenwriter known for his work in Telugu cinema. He is recognised for directing action dramas and action comedies.

Vinayak made his directorial debut with Aadi (2002), which was a commercial blockbuster. His work on the film earned him the Nandi Award for Best First Film of a Director. In 2003, he directed two successful films, Dil and Tagore. Tagore became a major box office success, setting records and emerging as the second highest-grossing Telugu film of its time.

He continued to deliver successful films, including Bunny (2005), Lakshmi (2006), Krishna (2008), Adhurs (2010), Naayak (2013), and Khaidi No. 150 (2017). In 2013, Vinayak also directed a short film to promote organ donation.

== Early life ==
V. V. Vinayak, was born on 9 October 1974 in Chagallu, Andhra Pradesh. His family owned a cinema hall, which influenced his early interest in films. Director E. V. V. Satyanarayana hailed from the nearby village of Dommeru. Vinayak completed his intermediate education while staying at his aunt's house in Dommeru.

After completing his education, he convinced his father to allow him to pursue a career in films. He began his career as an assistant director to E. V. V. Satyanarayana on Abbayigaru (1993). He later worked with director Sagar on Amma Donga (1995) and collaborated with him on six films.

Vinayak also worked as an assistant to S. V. Krishna Reddy on Sakutumba Saparivara Sametam (2000) and to Kranthi Kumar on Paadutha Theeyaga (1998) and 9 Nelalu (2000).

== Filmography ==
Key
†	Denotes films that have not yet been released

List of V. V. Vinayak film credits
Year	Film	Notes
2002	Aadi	Debut Film
2002	Chennakesava Reddy	
2003	Dil	
2003	Tagore	Remake of Ramanaa
2004	Samba	
2005	Bunny	Also writer
2006	Lakshmi	
2007	Yogi	Remake of Jogi
2008	Krishna	
2010	Adhurs	
2011	Badrinath	
2013	Naayak	
2014	Alludu Seenu	
2015	Akhil	
2017	Khaidi No. 150	Remake of Kaththi
2018	Inttelligent	
2023	Chatrapathi	Hindi film; Remake of film of the same name

== Awards ==
Nandi Awards

- Nandi Award for Best First Film of a Director - Aadi (2002)

Other Awards

- Santhosham Best Commercial Director award By Tharun Sakibanda - Tirupathi - Krishna (2008)
