= Krishna (2008 film) =

- Theatrical release poster
- Directed by: V. V. Vinayak
- Written by: V. V. Vinayak; Siva Akula
- Produced by: B. Kasi Viswanadham; D. V. V. Danayya (presenter)
- Starring: Ravi Teja; Trisha; Mukul Dev; Bramhanandam
- Cinematography: Chota K. Naidu
- Edited by: Gautham Raju
- Music by: Chakri
- Release date: 11 January 2008
- Running time: 147 minutes
- Country: India
- Language: Telugu
- Budget: ₹8 crore
- Box office: est. ₹24.60 crore distributors' share

Krishna is a 2008 Indian Telugu-language action comedy film directed by V. V. Vinayak and produced by B. Kasi Viswanatham, with D. V. V. Danayya presenting the film. The film stars Ravi Teja and Trisha, with music composed by Chakri and cinematography by Chota K. Naidu. Released on 11 January 2008 during the Sankranthi festival, Krishna was a blockbuster at the box office, emerging as the Sankranti winner of 2008. It collected a distributor's share of ₹24.60 crore and was the second highest-grossing Telugu film of the year and one of the highest-grossing Telugu films at the time of its release. It was also Ravi Teja's highest-grossing film at that point, surpassing Vikramarkudu.

The film was later remade in Kannada as Rajani (2009), in Bengali as Awara (2012), and in Bangladeshi as Prem Prem Paglami (2013).

== Plot ==
The film follows Krishna, a former software engineer who quits his job to help a friend and becomes unemployed in Vijayawada. Sandhya, a college student from Hyderabad, visits Vijayawada during her vacation to stay with her elder brother Bobby and his wife. Krishna falls in love with Sandhya at first sight and moves into the upper portion of her house as a tenant with his brother Chandra Shekar and sister-in-law.

During his attempts to win her affection, Krishna clashes with a local rowdy, Lanka Raju. Initially misunderstanding him as a troublemaker, Sandhya dislikes Krishna but later comes to appreciate his genuine nature. She returns to Hyderabad to live with her older brother, Shinde, a former builder and now a powerful gangster who is extremely protective of her. Krishna follows her to Hyderabad and, with the help of her brother works his way into her house, and finally wins her heart.

Krishna learns about Sandhya's past, including how she is being pursued by Jakka, a notorious gangster, who wants to marry her with the support of his uncle Jayaprakash. In the climax, Shinde kills Jakka, and Krishna marries Sandhya.

== Cast ==
- Ravi Teja as Krishna "Kittu"
- Trisha as Sandhya
- Mukul Dev as Jaladangi Kameswara Rao alias Jakka
- Brahmanandam as Bobby
- Vajja Venkata Giridhar as Rama Chandra Murthy
- Chandra Mohan as MRO Chandra Shekar, Krishna's elder brother
- Kadhal Dhandapani as Lanka Raju
- Sunil as Krishna's friend
- Raghu Babu as Raghu, Krishna's Father
- Sayaji Shinde as Shinde, Sandhya's brother
- Kota Srinivasa Rao as Advocate K. Srinivasa Rao
- Jaya Prakash Reddy as Jayaprakash, Jakka's uncle
- Tanikella Bharani as Government Officer Seshadri "Seshu"
- Sudha as Chandra Shekar's wife
- Venu Madhav as Venu (Bobby's house tenant)
- Karate Kalyani as Bobby's maid
- Sana as Bobby's wife
- Sujatha Reddy as Lanka Raju's wife
- Fish Venkat as Sattulu, Jakka's henchman
- Chitram Srinu as Krishna's friend
- M. S. Narayana as David
- Satyam Rajesh as David's assistant
- C. V. L. Narasimha Rao as Judge

== Production ==
Krishna marked the first collaboration between Ravi Teja and Trisha, a combination highly anticipated by fans and the actor himself. Following lukewarm receptions for his performance in Khatarnak (2006), director V. V. Vinayak encouraged Ravi Teja to bring a fresh and enthusiastic approach to the project. Trisha, coming off the success of Aadavari Matalaku Arthale Verule (2007), balanced her work on Krishna alongside Bujjigadu (2008).

Principal photography for Krishna included an extended schedule in Vijayawada, where filming lasted for a couple of weeks.

== Music ==
The music was composed by Chakri and released by Aditya Music. All lyrics were penned by Chandrabose. The song "Adaragottu" was reused from "Appadi Podu" from the 2004 film Ghilli, starring Vijay and Trisha and was composed by Vidyasagar.

Krishna

Soundtrack album by Chakri
- Released: 2008
- Recorded: 2008
- Genre: Soundtrack
- Length: 26:43
- Label: Aditya Music
- Producer: Chakri

Chakri chronology
Kasipatnam Chudara Babu (2007)	Krishna (2008)	Victory (2008)

Track list
No.	Title	Singer(s)	Length
1.	"Nee Soku Maada"	Chakri	4:08
2.	"Muripinchey"	Fareedh, Kousalya	4:35
3.	"Dil Mangey More"	Kunal Ganjawala, Mahalakshmi Iyer	3:44
4.	"Taratha Etthuku"	Raghu Kunche, Kousalya	4:36
5.	"Tu Mera Jil"	Udit Narayan, Sadhana Sargam	4:48
6.	"Adaragottu"	Vasu, Sivani	4:52
Total length:			26:43

== Box-office ==
The film grossed ₹7.6 crore in its opening week and grossed ₹13.88 crore in 2 weeks. By the end of its 4th week, it had grossed ₹18 crore. The film was blockbuster at the box office collecting ₹38 crore worldwide and was 2nd highest grossing Telugu film of that year after Jalsa. The film completed its 50 days theatrical run in 164 theatres by March 2, 2008, and 100 days in 53 centres by April 21, 2008.

== Television rights ==
The television rights of the film were sold to Zee Telugu. In 2023, Star Maa renewed the rights from Zee Telugu. The satellite rights of the Hindi dubbed version were given to Colors Cineplex.
