= K. J. Yesudas discography =

Indian multilingual singer (born 1940)

K. J. Yesudas is a multilingual singer, singing Indian classical music, devotional, light music, and film songs. His commercially published recordings span multiple genres.

== Carnatic Classical Music ==
=== Gurusmarana ===
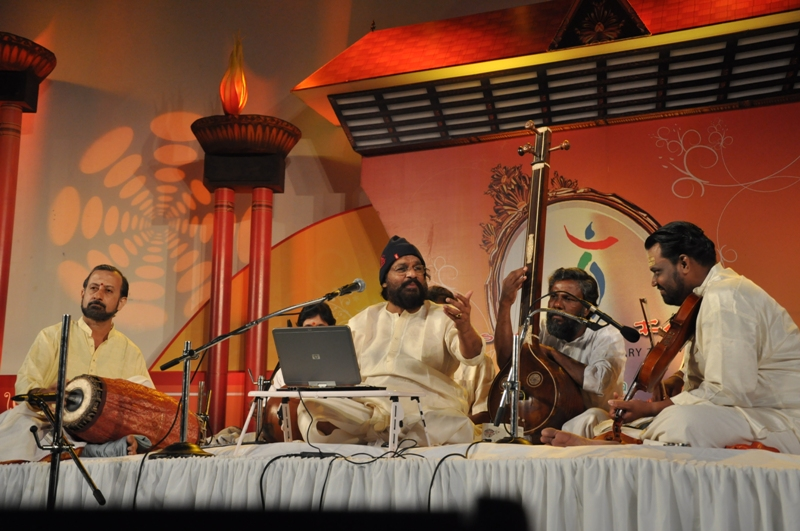
Classical music concert by Yesudas at Nishagandhi Dance and Music Festival, Thiruvananthapuram in 2011

Gurusmarana is one of Yesudas's Carnatic classical music albums, in which he sang with his guru, Chembai Vaidyanatha Bagavathar.

There are 2 cassettes currently released – Vol 1 & 2. Album produced by BGM Tharangini.

Songs:

- Viriboni varnam (Bhairavi)
- Vathapi Ganapathim Bhaje (Hamsadhvani)
- Pavana Guru (Hamsanandi)
- Ksheera Sagara (Devagandhari)
- Siva Siva Siva (Pantuvarali)

=== Thodi ===
Raaga Series – Raagam Thodi is a Carnatic classical music album, a garland kritis presented by Dr. K. J. Yesudas.

Album begins with the kriti Swami Unnai, followed by a Muthuswami Dikshitar composition Mahaganapathim. Yesudas decorates this kriti with Kalpanaswarams and gamakas. Other Kritis are `Sarasija’ and `Dakshayani’ and album ends with an Oothukadu Venkatasubba iyer composition 'Thaye Yesoda'. The album is produced by Tarangini Music, India.

Krithis

- Swami Unnei
- Mahaganapathim
- Yemijesina
- Sarasija
- Dakashayani
- Thaye Yasodha

=== Krishna Nee Begane Baaro ===
Krishna Nee Begane Baaro, a recording of live performance by Gana Gandharva Yesudas in the presence of Sri Sri Sri Vishveshatheertha Swamiji of Pejavara Sri Krishna Math, Udupi in early 2002. He is accompanied by Prov. V. Praveen on Mridangam, Mahadeva Sharma on violin and T. Radhakrishna on Ghatam.

- Gajavadana Beduve, Raagam : Hamsadhwani, Taalam : Aadi, Lyric : Sri Purandradasa
- Krishna Nee Begane, Raagam : Yaman Kalyani, Taalam : Mishra Chapu, Lyric : Vyasatirtha
- Tirupathi Venkataramana, Raagam : Keeravani, Taalam : Aadi, Lyric: Sri Purandradasa
- Kotta Bhaagyave Saako, Raagam : Shanmukhapriya, Taalam : Aadi, Lyric: Vidya prasanna theertha
- Nalidaade yenna Naaaliqe, Raagam : Shuddha Saveri, Taalam : Aadi, Lyric: Sri sri Ranga Viitala
- Srinivasa Yennabittu, Raagam : Sriranjani, Taalam : Aadi, Lyric: Sri sri Ranga Viitala
- Guruvina Gulaama, Raagam : Hamsanandi, Taalam : Aadi, Lyric: Sri Purandradasa
- Jagadodhaarana, Raagam : Kāpi, Taalam : Aadi, Lyric: Sri Purandradasa

== Festival Albums ==
=== Thiruvona Kaineettam ===
Thiruvona Kaineettam is an album of Onam festival Malayalam songs. All songs were written by Gireesh Puthenchery and the music was composed by Vidyasagar. Sujatha and Vijay Yesudas also sang in this album with Yesudas. Album released by Tharangini in 2001.

Songs

- Aaranmula Palliyodam ( Yesudas & Vijay Yesudas )
- Aaro Kamazhthivecha ( Yesudas & Sujatha )
- Chandanavala ( Sujatha & Vijay Yesudas )
- Illakkulangara ( Yesudas )
- Paraniraye ( Yesudas)
- Poomullakkodi ( Yesudas & Sujatha )
- Thevaaramuruvidum ( Yesudas )
- Villinmel ( Yesudas )

=== Ponnona Tharangini ===
Ponnona Tharangini is a musical album by Dr K J Yesudas. As the name suggests, the songs in the album were made on the basis of Onam, released by Tharangini. All songs were written by Sree Kumaran Thambi and the music was composed by Raveendran. Album released by Tharangini in 1992.

Songs

- Chingavayalkkili
- Mannin Manam
- Mudippokal Vadiyal
- Palnira Poo Ponchiri
- Pathira Maykathil
- Pookkalam Kanunna
- Thonikaranum avante pattum
- Uyarukayay

== Christian Devotional Songs ==
(to be completed)

== Light Music Albums ==
=== Madhura Geethangal (1970) ===
The album released in 1970 by HMV featured songs by Sreekumaran Thampi scored by V. Dakshinamoorthy

Songs

- Ee Lokagolathil
- Kalayude Sargamukhangal
- Kaliyakumbol karayum pennin
- Kanikandunaruvan
- Karalin kilimarathil
- Marathaka pattuduth
- Mathilekha
- Onakodiyuduthu
- Oru karimottinte kathayanu
- Oru moha lathikayil
- Thuyilunaroo

=== Madhura Geethangal vol.2 (1972) Hridayasangamam ===
The album released by HMV featured songs written by Sreekumaran Thampi, O. N. V. Kurup and TKR Bhadran. The music was composed by M. S. Baburaj, G. Devarajan, B. A. Chidambaranath and V. Dakshinamoorthy

Songs

- Adyathe nottathil
- Anuragalola nee
- Kadanathin kaatilengo
- Maaleyamaniyum
- Mamboo viriyunna
- Pambanadiyude
- Pandu paadiya paatilorenam
- Prabatha reshmikale
- Raavin chundilunnarnu
- Swarnathin sugantham

=== Vishaadha Gaanangal vol.1 (1983) ===
The album released by Tharangini contains songs penned by Balu Kiriyath and scored by Darsan Raman.

Songs

- Aa nalla naalinte
- Aarum kelkatha
- Ente praarthana
- Ettum pottum thiriyatha
- Iniyaare thirayunnu
- Karthika thaaramurangi
- Kadalin agaadhathayil
- Orikkal eeshwaran
- Parayathe ente
- Prathisthutha priya vadhu
- Swapnangal oru vazhiye
- Thiruvaathira poove

=== Vasantha Geethangal (1984) ===
The album released in 1984 by Tharangini, has 10 songs written by Bichu Thirumala and scored by Raveendran Master

Songs

- Arayaname
- Aruviyalakal
- Kaalam oru pularkalam
- Kayal kaneerolangal
- Kili makalae
- Maamankam
- Maavu pootha
- Sangeetham
- Sravana pournami
- Valampiri shankil

=== Raaga Tharangini (1987) ===
The album released in 1987 by Tharangini contains songs written by Yusufali Kechery and scored by Vidhyadaran Master.

Songs

- Amaavasi naalil
- Aruma sakhi
- Enniku ninnodu
- Guruvayoorappan
- Manmadha Jwarathinu
- Mohakuruvikku
- Nin Meni
- Omane nin kavil
- Pooja Maniyara
- Thozhi ninakkoru kavitha
- Vaanile nandhini

=== Vishaadha Gaanganal vol.2 (1993) ===
Sourcer:

The album released in 1993 by Tharangini features songs written by Poovachal Khader and scored by J. M. Raju.

Songs

- Aathma sakhi
- Ekaakini
- Maanam chonnedi
- Njaanumen
- Oru Sandhya
- Parayanullath
- Vennilave

== Hindu Devotional Releases ==
=== Hymns from the Rig-Veda ===
The Album Hymns from the Rig-Veda is one of the greatest albums of K J Yesudas. The album composed by Maestro Sri Rangasami Parthasarathy and recorded using Indian musical instruments in the background score. The Rig-Veda is the most ancient of the four Vedas and is one of the oldest texts of any Indo-European language and one of the world's oldest religious texts.

Forty minutes album consists of 1028 Hymns in 10 Mandalas. 37 slokas from Mandalas V-51-11 to 15; VII-35-1 to 13; X-63-6 to 17; X-190-1 to 3; X-191-1 to 4.

Album contained the text in Sanskrit with transliteration in English. Album released in 1979 by Oriental Records.

=== Music for Meditation – Gayatri Mantra ===
Album Music for Meditation – Gayatri Mantra was composed by Sri Rangasami Parthasarathy and sung by K J Yesudas. The Gayatri Mantra is sung in nine different ragas to symbolize the oneness of Divinity. Album released by Oriental Records. Vocal Artist: K. J. Yesudas Flute: Hariprasad Chaurasia Santoor: Shivkumar Sharma Sarod: Brij Narayan Sitar: Janardhan Mitta Veena & Music: R. Parthasarathy

=== Bhagavad-Gita – Song of God ===
Bhagavad-Gita – Song of God is the Sanskrit album series by Yesudas with music composed and produced by R Parthasarathy in 1977 and released by Oriental Records. The Bhagavad-Gita is as the spiritual wisdom of India.

Bhagavad-Gita, Chapter 12, 15 contains selected slokas from the chapter 12 and 15. Chapter 12 is on the Bhakti Yoga. Krishna describes the glory of devotion to God. Chapter 15 is known as Purusottama yoga. Krishna reveals the virtues, glories and transcendental characteristics of God. He explains the purpose and value of knowing about God.

Bhagavad-Gita, Chapter II – CD contains selected 38 slokas from the 72 Slokas in the Chapter II. Starting from sloka 20 which states, " The Atma is never born nor does it die", the artists recorded all the major slokas and concludes with 71 & 72 which states, " One who abandons all desires attains the state of final emancipation".

=== Mayilppeeli ===
Mayilppeeli is a Malayalam Hindu devotional album composed by K. G. Jayan in 1988. The lyrics of the songs were written by S. Ramesan Nair and sung by Dr. K. J. Yesudas. The album was produced by Yesudas' Tharangini Records. Upon release all the songs were become instant hits and still considered as evergreen classics.

== Light Music ==
=== Ahimsa ===
Songs are

- Ahimsa
- Atta Apu
- Beauty All Around
- Circle Of Return
- Gitanjali
- Hari
- Misere Karuna
- Nirahamhara
- Sari Sari.

=== Sitaron Mein Tu Hi ===
Sitaron Mein Tu Hi is one of Yesudas's hit music albums in Hindi. Songs are written by Mehboob and the music direction by Maestro Lalit Sen. Album was released by Universal in 2000.

Songs

- Chamak cham cham
- Door Humse Na Tum
- Dosti Hai Humne To Kiye
- Ishq Mushq Na Chupte
- Itna Bhi
- Man Mohini
- Sajni Sajni
- Sanwari Saloni Us Pe
- Tu Jaan Hai
- Tujh Se Bichhad Ke

== Film Music ==
=== Malayalam ===
Popular songs sung by Yesudas and composed by Baburaj are : Thamasamente Varuvaan – Bhargavi Nilayam (1964), Vellichilankayaninjumkondoru Pennu – Kaattuthulasi (1965), Nadhikalil – Anaarkali (1966), Innale Mayangumbol – Anveshichu Kandethiyilla (1967), Pranasakhi Njan Verumoru & Orupushpam Mathramen – Pareeksha (1967), Ezhuthiyatharanu Sujatha & Kalichirimaaraatha Penne;- Udhyogastha (1967), Ikkareyanente Tamasam – Karthika (1968),

Hit songs with composer Dakshinamoorthy are Swapnangale Ningal – Kavyamela (1965), Kakkathamburatti – Inapravukal (1965), Hrudaya Sarassile – Paadunna Puzha (1968), Ponveyil – Nirthasala (1972).

Songs by Yesudas with Devarajan master's music that became hits are : Ashtamudikkayalile – Manavatty (1964), Manikya Veena – Kattupookkal (1965), Kattadichu – Thulabharam (1968), Thangabhasma – Koottukudumbam (1969), Aayiram Padasarangal – Nadi (1969), Sangamam Sangamam – Triveni (1970), Omalale Kandu – Sindhoora Cheppu (1971), Chandralekha Kinnari;- C.I.D. Nazir (1971), Manushyan Mathangale Srishtichu – Achanum Bappayum (1972), Sankalppa Vrundaavanathil;- Taxi Car (1972), Indravallarippoo Choodivarum – Gandharava Kshetram (1972), Padmatheerthame Unaroo – Gayathri (1973). He sang most of his Malayalam songs in the music of Devarajan master – around 600, which is a record.

Songs with Salil Chowdhury are Neela Ponmane – Nellu (1974), Kalakalam Kayalolangal – Ee Ganam Marakkumo (1978), Madaprave Vaa – Madhanotsavam (1978), Shyamameghame Neeyen – Samayamayilla Polum (1978).

From 1980s, his hit songs are with composers such as Raveendran, Shyam, M. G. Radhakrishnan, Jerry Amaldev and Johnson. Yesudas made a lot of hit songs with Raveendran master. Ezhuswarangalum – Chiriyo chiri (1982), Kanana Poikayil Kalabham – Ariyapedatha Rahasiyam (1981), Pramadhavanam – His Highness Abdullah (1990).

Devanganagal Kayyozhinja tharakam from the film Njan Gandharvan (1991) is a popular song by composed by Johnson.

Because of his immense talent and popularity he is often preferred by music directors/producers to render the songs which require the power factor and extreme variations in ragas mainly in the big budget movies. The song 'Aadiyushassandhya' from the movie 'Pazhassi Raja' is an example for his voice clarity even at the age of 69.

His latest hits are Kadaniyum Kalchilambe {pulimurugan-2016}, Kanditum Kandittum [villain,2017] and Poyi Maranja Kalam from the movie Viswasapoorvam Mansoor for which Yesudas won the National Award for Best Male Playback Singer.

=== Tamil ===
After Malayalam, he sang the most in Tamil. Yesudas's first song in Tamil film was in the film Bommai (1963) – Neeyum Bommai. Urimai Kural (1974) – VizhiyE kadhai ezhuthu composed by M. S. Viswanathan Dr. Siva (1975) – Malarae kurinji malarae )M. S. Viswanathan Naalai Namadhe (1975) – Ennai vittal yArumillai Vazhvu En Pakkam (1976) – Veenai pesum adhu meettum viralgalai kandu perum pugazhum (1976) – Thaane thanakkul sirikkindraal Idhaya malar (1976)- Chendu malli poo pol azhagiya pandhu Neela malargal 1979 – Idhu irava pagalaa Thrishoolam- Thirumaalin thirumarbil sreedevi mugamae Vayasu Ponnu (1978) – Kaanchi Pattuduththi[Ilaiyaraaja]

He made lot of hit songs. Other major music directors worked with him are Ilaiyaraja, A. R. Rahman, Rajkumar S.A., S. Balachander, Vaidyanathan L., Deva, Gangai Amaran, Aadithyan, K. V. Mahadevan, Shankar–Ganesh and Vidyasagar.

He had fortune to sing songs written by Subramanya Bharathy (Yezhavuthu Manithan, 1981) and Bharati, 2000) and Kannadasan.'En Iniya Pon Nilave' – Moodu Pani, 'Poove Sempoove' – Solla Thudikkuthu manasu, 'Aarariraro' – Raam, 'Raaja Raaja Chozan' – Rettai Vaal Kuruvi, Thendral Vanthu' – Thendrale Ennai Thodu, 'Kanne Kalaimaane' & 'Poongaatru' – Moondram Pirai, 'Vaa Vaa Anbe' – Agni Natchathiram, 'Vellai Puraa' – Pudhu Kavithai are popular. He was awarded Kalaimamani Award and eight time State Award for the best playback singer from Tamil Nadu Government.

=== Kannada ===
He made lot of hit songs in Kannada films. Some hit songs are

- Anuragadalil Gandharva Gana – Gandharva
- Hoovina Lokha Nammadu – Kempu Gulabi
- Gouria Roopa Ninamma – Madura Preethi
- Anatha maguvaade – Hosa Jeevana
- Preethi Mador Madhya Hogi – Mallige Hoove
- Andavo Andavu Kannadanadu – Mallige Hoove
- Kele Kele Bharatha Mathe – Abhimanyu
- Nagumoo Mohana – Rayaru Bandaru Mavana Manege
- Nammoora Yuvarani – Ramachaari
- Ramachaari Haaduva – Ramachaari
- Ee Yavvana Madhura – Ramarajyadhalli Raksharu
- Yaakamma Beku – Sneha
- Haadonda Naa Haaduvenu – Shruthi
- Meru Giriyane – S. P. Sangliyana Part 2
- Mane Mandi Gella – Triveni
- Navarathri Nota Nayana Mohana – Shri Durgey Pooje
- Sone Sone – Preethsod Thappa
- Bangardinda – Preethsod Tappa
- Ellellu Sangeethave – Malaya Marutha
- Yaare Neenu Cheluve – Naanu Nanna Hendthi
- Ninnantha Kathaikaru – Asambhava
- Paaramaartha Thathwa – Ganayogi Panchakshara Gawai
- Naanu Kannadada Kanda – A.K 47
- Ago Bandanu – Dore
- Ade Saagara – Prithviraj
- Banni Kannamuche Adona – Prithviraj

Major Kannada musicians worked with him are Hamsalekha, R. Sudarsanam, S. A. Rajkumar, V.Manohar, Upendrakumar and Gurukiran. He is one of the favourite singers of ace musician and lyricist Hamsalekha. He often records songs with him, and the duo has produced a number of hit songs. He also sang for a number of devotional songs in Kannada.

== Telugu ==
Yesudas has been singing in both Classical and film songs in Telugu.His first song in Telugu was Oh Nindu Chandamama composed by S. P. Kodandapani for the movie Bangaru Thimmaraju (1964).

Year	Film	Song	Composer(s)	Writer(s)	Co-artist(s)
1964	Bangaru Thimmaraju	"Oh Nindu Chandamama"	S. P. Kodandapani		
1964	Kavala Pillalu	"Aame Baliyai"	Viswanathan–Ramamoorthy		P. B. Sreenivas
1964	Kavala Pillalu	"Maa Manase"	Viswanathan–Ramamoorthy		
1965	Prachanda Bhairavi	"Needhanara Nannelara"	Pendyala Nageshwara Rao		S. Janaki, B. Vasantha, Venkata Rao
1967	Iddaru Monagaallu	"Konguna Kattesukona"	S. P. Kodandapani		S. Janaki
1967	Sri Sri Sri Maryada Ramanna	"Vennela Undhi"	S. P. Kodandapani		P. Susheela
1967	Sathyame Jayam	"Nee Sogase Niganigalaadi"	S. P. Kodandapani		P. Susheela
1968	Manchi Kutumbam	"Preminchuta Pillala"	S. P. Kodandapani		P. Susheela, S. Janaki, Sowcar Janaki, Rallabhandi
1969	Prathikaram	"Stop Look And Go"	Satyam		S. Janaki
1970	Marina Manishi	"Chinnavada Velathava"	T. V. Raju		B. Vasantha
1971	Mary Matha	"Sagara Theera Sameepana"	G. Devarajan		
1971	Mary Matha	"Thana Thana Thandana"	G. Devarajan		P. Madhuri
1971	Sri Krishna Satya	"Sri Rama Jaya Rama"	Pendyala Nageshwara Rao		
1971	Sri Krishna Satya	"Kasthuri Thilakam"	Pendyala Nageshwara Rao		
1971	Sri Krishna Satya	"Sri Raghavam"(Slokam)	Pendyala Nageshwara Rao		
1971	Sri Krishna Satya	"Kavvadithodi Porithamu"	Pendyala Nageshwara Rao		
1972	Kula Gowravam	"Thera Chaapavantidi"	T. G. Lingappa		
1972	Prema Pakshulu	"Aaddham Choosthe"	Ashwathama Gudimetla		
1972	Prema Pakshulu	"Thellaredhaka Nuvvu"	Ashwathama Gudimetla		
1972	Prema Pakshulu	"Visavisa Nadiche"	Ashwathama Gudimetla		
1973	Nenu Naa Desham	"Kurisenu Hrudayamulo"	Satyam		P. Susheela
1975	Miss Julie Prema Katha	"Julie Yes Darling"	Satyam		P. Madhuri
1975	Miss Julie Prema Katha	"Vennela"	Satyam		
1975	Swamy Ayyappa	"Jagamula Netha"	G. Devarajan		
1975	Swamy Ayyappa	"Harivarasanam Viswamohanam"	G. Devarajan		
1975	Swamy Ayyappa	"Sabarimalanu Swarna"	G. Devarajan		
1976	Anthuleni Katha	"Devude Ichadu"	M. S. Viswanathan		
1977	Bhadrakali	"Chinni Chinni Kannayya"	Ilaiyaraaja		P. Susheela
1977	Tholireyi Gadichindi	"Jabilli Merisele"	Satyam		P. Susheela
1979	Dasha Thirigindhi	"Andhala Naa Krishnaveni"	Satyam		
1979	Rama Banam	"Amma Premaku"(Sad)	Satyam		
1980	Sivamethina Sathyam	"Neevu Naa Pakkanunte"	J. V. Raghavulu		Vani Jairam
1980	Sivamethina Sathyam	"Geetha O Geetha"	J. V. Raghavulu		Vani Jairam
1981	Dhaari Thappina Manishi	"Vu Anna Aa Anna"	Vijaya Bhaskar		P. Susheela
1981	Illaalu	"Oh Baatasaari"	K. Chakravarthy		S. P. Sailaja
1981	Jegantalu	"Evaramma Evaramma"	K. V. Mahadevan		Vani Jairam
1982	Golconda Abbulu	"Twinkle Twinkle"	K. V. Mahadevan		
1982	Gruha Pravesam	"Dhaari Choopina Devatha"	Satyam		
1982	Meghasandesam	"Sigalo Avi Virulo"	Ramesh Naidu		
1982	Meghasandesam	"Seetha Vela Raaneeyaku"	Ramesh Naidu		P. Susheela
1982	Meghasandesam	"Navarasa Sumamalika"	Ramesh Naidu		
1982	Meghasandesam	"Priye Chaarusheele"	Ramesh Naidu		P. Susheela
1982	Meghasandesam	"Radhika Krishna"	Ramesh Naidu		P. Susheela
1982	Meghasandesam	"Aakaasha Deshaana"	Ramesh Naidu		
1982	Meghasandesam	"Navarasa Sumamalika"(Bit)	Ramesh Naidu		
1982	Meghasandesam	"Poems"	Ramesh Naidu		
1982	Mettela Savvadi	"Yedhi Aa Nadham Yemaipoyindho"	Ilaiyaraaja		S. Janaki
1982	Mettela Savvadi	"Jeevithame Andhala"	Ilaiyaraaja		S. Janaki
1982	Mettela Savvadi	"Saage Padhamu"	Ilaiyaraaja		
1982	Swayamvaram	"Gaali Vaanalo"	Satyam		
1982	Yamakinkarudu	"Kantiki Nuvve Deepam"	Chandrashekar		P. Susheela, S. P. Balasubrahmanyam
1983	Dharmaatmudu	"Thaka Dhimi"	Satyam		
1983	Kalyana Veena	"Veguchukka Molichindi"	Satyam		
1983	Rudrakaali	"Oka Kavi Ninu Kani"	Satyam		S. Janaki
1984	Chadarangam	"Mabbu Musurukuntondi"	J. V. Raghavulu		P. Susheela
1984	Chadarangam	"Oke Muddu Chaalu"	J. V. Raghavulu		P. Susheela
1984	Ee Tharam Illalu	"Sirimalle Poola"	Ilaiyaraaja		P. Susheela
1984	Ee Tharam Illalu	"Raagam Madhuram"	Ilaiyaraaja		P. Susheela
1984	Memu Meelanti Manushulame	"Devudunnado Ledo"	Krishna Prasad		
1984	Priyamaina Rajinikanth	"Muddabanthi Kulikeve"	Ilaiyaraaja		
1984	Sahasame Jeevitham	"Sagaali Mana Yathra"	Ilaiyaraaja		
1984	Sahasame Jeevitham	"Prema Nidhiki Viralamu"	Ilaiyaraaja		
1984	Sahasame Jeevitham	"Mabbulo Chandamama"	Ilaiyaraaja		
1984	Sahasame Jeevitham	"Breake Vesthe"	Ilaiyaraaja		S. Janaki
1985	Andharikante Monagadu	"Kantiki Kunuke"	K. V. Mahadevan		Ramesh Naidu, S. P. Balasubrahmanyam
1985	Brahmamudi	"Evaru Pettaro"	Chandrashekar		P. Susheela
1985	Brahmamudi	"Rajani Rajani"	Chandrashekar		Lalitha Sagari
1985	Brahmamudi	"Prema Annadi"	Chandrashekar		
1985	Edadugula Bandham	"Endhuku Endhuku"	Shankar–Ganesh		
1985	Kalyana Thilakam	"Sapametho Veruchese"	J. V. Raghavulu		
1985	Kalyana Thilakam	"Amma Neeku Nuvve"	J. V. Raghavulu		S. P. Sailaja
1985	Kutumba Bandham	"Ye Kanuka Iyyagalanu"	Satyam		
1985	Maha Manishi	"Choopulu Choopulu"	J. V. Raghavulu		P. Susheela
1985	Maha Manishi	"Evaru Nenu Evaru Nenu"	J. V. Raghavulu		P. Susheela
1985	Pachani Kapuram	"Kotthagaa Mathugaa"	K. Chakravarthy		
1985	Pachani Kapuram	"Vennelainaa"(Male)	K. Chakravarthy		
1985	Pachani Kapuram	"Naa Prema Raagam"	K. Chakravarthy		
1985	Pachani Kapuram	"Vennelainaa"(Duet)	K. Chakravarthy		
1985	Siksha	"Vidhi Pagalesina"	K. V. Mahadevan		
1985	Sindhu Bhairavi	"Mahaganapathim"	Ilaiyaraaja		
1985	Sindhu Bhairavi	"Mari Mari"	Ilaiyaraaja		
1985	Sindhu Bhairavi	"Poomalaga Vadanuga"	Ilaiyaraaja		
1985	Sindhu Bhairavi	"Rasamanjari"	Ilaiyaraaja		
1985	Sindhu Bhairavi	"Moham Annudu"	Ilaiyaraaja		
1985	Sindhu Bhairavi	"Nee Kudithi"	Ilaiyaraaja		
1985	Sindhu Bhairavi	"Nee Dayaradha"	Ilaiyaraaja		
1985	Sri Mantralaya Raghavendra Swamy Mahathyam	"Aadave Lalana"	Ilaiyaraaja		
1985	Sri Mantralaya Raghavendra Swamy Mahathyam	"Rama Namamu Vedame"	Ilaiyaraaja		Vani Jairam, Seenukutti
1985	Sri Mantralaya Raghavendra Swamy Mahathyam	"Kadhalia Raa Madhava"	Ilaiyaraaja		Madhavapeddi Satyam
1986	Aadi Dampatulu	"Kadalinigani"	Satyam		P. Susheela
1986	Eenati O Ammayi	"Mogala Shahajadiva"	V Shiva Reddy		P. Susheela
1986	Eenati O Ammayi	"Nannu Ardham Chesuko"	V Shiva Reddy		Radhika
1986	Jayam Manade	"Rani Vaasala O Rama"	K. Chakravarthy		P. Susheela
1986	Jeevana Poratam	"Marachipo Nesthama"	K. Chakravarthy		
1986	Neti Yugadharmam	"Veena Palukadha"	J. V. Raghavulu		P. Susheela
1986	Neti Yugadharmam	"Shramikulaara"	J. V. Raghavulu		P. Susheela
1986	Neti Yugadharmam	"Veena Palukadha"(Pathos)	J. V. Raghavulu		P. Susheela
1986	Nireekshana	"Chukkalle Thochave"	Ilaiyaraaja		
1986	Sri Shirdi Saibaba Mahathyam	"Hey Pandu Ranga"	Ilaiyaraaja		
1986	Sri Shirdi Saibaba Mahathyam	"Maa Papaalu Tholagainchu"	Ilaiyaraaja		
1986	Sri Shirdi Saibaba Mahathyam	"Slokams"	Ilaiyaraaja		
1986	Tandra Paparayudu	"Abhinandhana Mandhara"	Saluri Rajeshwara Rao		P. Susheela
1986	Tandra Paparayudu	"Athipragalbha"	Saluri Rajeshwara Rao		
1986	Tandra Paparayudu	"Lalitha Pulakantha"	Saluri Rajeshwara Rao		P. Susheela
1986	Tandra Paparayudu	"Malle Kanna Thellana"	Saluri Rajeshwara Rao		
1986	Ugra Narasimham	"Veyi Kannulu Eduru"	Satyam		P. Susheela
1986	Veta	"O Ledi Koona"	K. Chakravarthy		
1986	Vikram	"O Kalama"	K. Chakravarthy		
1987	Aatma Bandhuvulu	"Nee Kannula Needalo"	Chandrashekar		P. Susheela
1987	Chinnari Devatha	"Maa Inti Pere Anuragam"	K. Chakravarthy		Lalitha Sagari
1987	Garjinchina Ganga	"Thalukuloluku"	Ilaiyaraaja		S. Janaki
1987	Kaala Rathri	"Jeevana Sangeetham"	Reghu Kumar		
1987	Kaala Rathri	"Sugandha Kusumam"	Reghu Kumar		
1987	Muddayi	"Devalayaanne Vidanaade"	K. Chakravarthy		P. Susheela
1987	Sankeertana	"Ye Naavade Theeramo"	Ilaiyaraaja		
1987	Srimathi Oka Bahumathi	"Ningini Vidichina"	Shankar–Ganesh		
1987	Sruthilayalu	"Thelavaradhemo"(Male)	K. V. Mahadevan		
1988	Aalochinchandi	"Nirudhyoga Uppenalo"	Satyam		
1988	Asthulu Anthasthulu	"Midisipade Deepalivi"	Ilaiyaraaja		
1988	Indradhanusu	"Katha Yedhaina"	Raj–Koti		
1988	Jeevana Jyothi	"Neeve Amma Jyothi"	Raj–Koti		
1988	Kanchana Seetha	"Kaalama Saagaku"	Satyam		S. Janaki
1988	Menamama	"Aasharepe"	Ilaiyaraaja		Vani Jairam
1988	Menamama	"Palletoollu"	Ilaiyaraaja		
1988	Rudraveena	"Lalitha Priya"	Ilaiyaraaja		K. S. Chithra
1988	Rudraveena	"Thulasi Dhalamulache"	Ilaiyaraaja		
1988	Rudraveena	"Neethone"	Ilaiyaraaja		
1988	Rudraveena	"Maanava Deva"	Ilaiyaraaja		
1988	Saagara Geetham	"Oh Vennela"	Ilaiyaraaja		
1988	Saagara Geetham	"Vinave Vinave Thudhiswasa"	Ilaiyaraaja		K. S. Chithra
1989	Laila	"Laila O Laila"	M. S. Viswanathan		
1989	Praja Theerpu	"Palikenu Naalona Mohana"	K. Chakravarthy		P. Susheela
1989	Rowdy Mogudu	"Andhaala Nelabaala"	Vijay anand		K. S. Chithra
1989	Sreerama Chandrudu	"Manmadha Baanam"	Satyam		P. Susheela, S. P. Balasubrahmanyam
1990	Abhisarika	"Aagaka Manasaagaka"	Vasu Rao		
1990	Adavilo Anveshana	"Ammanu Namminacho"	M. S. Viswanathan		
1990	Ayyappa Swamy Janma Rahashyam	"Lokaveram"(Slokam)	K. V. Mahadevan		
1990	Ayyappa Swamy Janma Rahashyam	"Swami Ayyappa"	K. V. Mahadevan		
1990	Ayyappa Swamy Janma Rahashyam	"Harivaraasanam"	K. V. Mahadevan		
1990	Alludugaru	"Kondalalo Nelakonna"	K. V. Mahadevan		K. S. Chithra
1990	Alludugaru	"Muddabanthi Puvvulo"	K. V. Mahadevan		K. S. Chithra
1990	Alludugaru	"Nagumomu Ganaleni"	K. V. Mahadevan		
1990	Ghatana	"Vidhi Chethilo Bommalu"	Manoj–Gyan		
1990	Intinti Deepavali	"Madhuram Madhuram"	Siva Shankar		K. S. Chithra
1990	Maa Inti Katha	"Koyila Koyila Koyilammalo"	K. Chakravarthy		K. S. Chithra
1990	Maa Inti Katha	"Idhena Runanu Bandham"	K. Chakravarthy		
1990	O Papa Lali	"Neevega Naa Pranam"	Ilaiyaraaja		K. S. Chithra
1990	O Papa Lali	"Segali Sandhela"	Ilaiyaraaja		K. S. Chithra
1990	Udhyamam	"Swagatham Suswagatham"	Raj–Koti		K. S. Chithra
1991	Amma Rajinama	"Srustikartha Oka Brahma"	K. Chakravarthy		
1991	Assembly Rowdy	"Andhamaina Vennelalona"	K. V. Mahadevan		K. S. Chithra
1991	Brahmarshi Viswamitra	"Priya Cheliya"	Ravindra Jain		P. Susheela
1991	Brahmarshi Viswamitra	"Ganga Taranga"	Ravindra Jain		
1991	Brahmarshi Viswamitra	"Kaushalya Suprajarama"	Ravindra Jain		
1991	Dalapathi	"Singarala"	Ilaiyaraaja		S. P. Balasubrahmanyam
1991	Manjeera Nadham	"Aagiponi Neeke"	K. V. Mahadevan		
1991	Minor Raja	"Nadi Veedhilo Amma"	Vidyasagar		K. S. Chithra
1991	Rowdy Gaari Pellam	"Kunti Kumari"	Bappi Lahiri		
1991	Rowdy Gaari Pellam	"Boyavani Vetuku"	Bappi Lahiri		
1991	Rowdy Gaari Pellam	"Theeripoye"(Bit)	Bappi Lahiri		
1991	Vidhatha	"Chiranjeevi Maa Nanna Pelliki"	Shyam		K. S. Chithra, Mano
1992	Brahma	"Chumma Chumma"	Bappi Lahiri		K. S. Chithra
1992	Brahma	"Musi Musi Navvulalona"	Bappi Lahiri		
1992	Donga Police	"Aa Poola Rangu Naa Cheera"	Bappi Lahiri		K. S. Chithra
1992	Gang War	"Valapukidhe"	Raj–Koti		Swarnalatha
1992	Pattudhala	"Yeppudu Voppukovaddura"	Ilaiyaraaja		
1992	Peddarikam	"Idhele Tharatharala"(Solo)	Raj–Koti		
1992	Peddarikam	"Idhele Tharatharala"(Duet)	Raj–Koti		Swarnalatha
1993	Anna Vadhina	"Penchukunna Malletheega"	M. S. Viswanathan		K. S. Chithra
1993	Chittemma Mogudu	"Chinuku Raalithe"	K. V. Mahadevan		K. S. Chithra
1993	Chittemma Mogudu	"Nindu Kundala"	K. V. Mahadevan		
1993	Director Gari Pellam	"Idhe Nizam"	Ilaiyaraaja		
1993	Kaliyugam	"Bantureethi Koluvu"	Mohan Sithara		
1993	Kunthi Puthrudu	"Oka Hrudayam Palikina"	Ilaiyaraaja		
1993	Kunthi Puthrudu	"Gummali Thommidhi"(Male)	Ilaiyaraaja		
1993	Major Chandrakanth	"Muddultho Onamaalu"	M. M. Keeravani		K. S. Chithra
1993	Naga Jyothi	"Nee Nosata Kumkuma"	Vidyasagar		K. S. Chithra
1993	Sarigamalu	"Krishna kripa Saagaram"	Bombay Ravi		K. S. Chithra
1993	Sarigamalu	"Swararaga Ganga"	Bombay Ravi		
1993	Sarigamalu	"Raagasudharasa"	Bombay Ravi		K. S. Chithra
1994	Allari Police	"Anaganaga"	Ilaiyaraaja		
1994	Neram	"Veyra Mundadugu"	Naveen - Jyothi		
1994	Palnati Pourusham	"Neeli Mabbu Kondallona"	A. R. Rahman		K. S. Chithra
1994	President Gari Alludu	"Kommadige Remmadige"	Madhavapeddi Suresh		K. S. Chithra, S. Janaki
1995	Ammaleni Puttillu	"Chedirina Nee Kumkumale"	Vandemataram Srinivas		
1995	Amma Naa Kodala	"Ye Nyayasthanam"	Vandemataram Srinivas		
1995	Pedarayudu	"Kadile kalama"	Koti		K. S. Chithra
1995	Sogasu Chooda Tarama	"Sogasu Chooda Tarama"	Bharadwaj		
1996	Amma Nanna Kaavali	"Kathaga Migilinda"	Vandemataram Srinivas		
1996	Aranyam	"Jo Laali Jo Laali"(Happy)	Vandemataram Srinivas		
1996	Aranyam	"Jo Laali Jo Laali"(Sad)	Vandemataram Srinivas		
1996	Bala Ramayanam	"Andabayani Jantaga"	Madhavapeddi Suresh		K. S. Chithra
1996	Bharateeyudu	"Pachani Chilukalu"	A. R. Rahman		
1996	Neti Savithri	"Evare Kannavaru"	Devendran		
1996	Pavitra Bandham	"Apuroopam"	M. M. Keeravani		
1996	Soggadi Pellam	"Konda Kona"	Koti		K. S. Chithra
1996	Soggadi Pellam	"Konda Kona"(Pathos)	Koti		
1996	Srikaram	"Manasu Kastha"	Ilaiyaraaja		
1996	Srikaram	"Nithyam Raguluthunna"	Ilaiyaraaja		
1997	Adavilo Anna	"Addhala Medaku"	Vandemataram Srinivas		Swarnalatha
1997	Adavilo Anna	"Vellipoyava Amma"	Vandemataram Srinivas		
1997	Adavilo Anna	"Vandhanalamma"	Vandemataram Srinivas		S. Janaki
1997	Bobbili Dora	"Bommalenni Chesina"	Koti		
1997	Collector Garu	"Entha Manchivadavayya"	Koti		K. S. Chithra
1997	Collector Garu	"Janma Ichinandhuku"	Koti		
1997	Evandi Pelli Chesukondi	"Nee Nosatana Kumkuma"	Koti		
1997	Hitler	"O Kaalama"	Koti		
1997	Maa Aayana Bangaram	"Chitti Koona"(Sad)	Vandemataram Srinivas		
1997	Pelli	"Anuraagame Mantramga"	S. A. Rajkumar		
1997	Pelli Chesukundam	"Nuvvemi Chesavu Neram"	Koti		
1997	Rakshakudu	"Ninne Ninne"	A. R. Rahman		Sadhana Sargam
1997	Thambulalu	"Evari Thalaratha Evaru"	Raj		
1998	Eshwar Allah	"Chempalaku Siggandham"	Koti		K. S. Chithra
1998	Kanyadanam	"Edhiprema Charithraki"	Koti		
1998	Kanyadanam	"Kanule Vethike"	Koti		
1998	Kanyadanam	"Ekkadundhi Nyayam"	Koti		
1998	Khaidi Garu	"Devathalaara Deevinchandi"	Koti		
1998	Pavitra Prema	"O Daivama"	Koti		
1998	Raayudu	"Jolali Jolali"	S. A. Rajkumar		
1998	Raayudu	"Epudo Paadindhi"	S. A. Rajkumar		
1998	Snehithulu	"Yennenni Kalalu"	Koti		
1998	Srimathi Vellostha	"Andhamaina"	Koti		
1998	Sri Ramulayya	"Bhoomiki Pachani"	Vandemataram Srinivas	Kalekuri Prasad	
1998	Sri Ramulayya	"Ghadiya Ghadiya"	Vandemataram Srinivas	Suddala Ashok Teja	K. S. Chithra
1998	Sri Ramulayya	"Karma Bhoomilo"	Vandemataram Srinivas	Kalekuri Prasad	
1998	Suryudu	"Maa Thandri Suryuda"	Vandemataram Srinivas		
1999	Aavide Shyamala	"Omkara Roopana"	Madhavapeddi Suresh		
1999	Hello My Dear Monisha	"Nammodhu Nammodhu"	T. Rajendar		
1999	Krishna Babu	"O Manasa"	Koti		
1999	Yamajathakudu	"Navvalamma Navvali"	Vandemataram Srinivas		
2000	Ammo Okato Tareekhu	"Sagatu Manishi"	Vandemataram Srinivas		
2000	Ayodhya Ramayya	"Kolo Kokkolo"	Vandemataram Srinivas		
2000	Chalo Assembly	"Sirigalla Bharatha Desham"	J. V. Raghavulu		
2000	Chalo Assembly	"O Bidda Naa Bidda"	J. V. Raghavulu		
2000	Postman	"Acha Tenugula Padaranala"	Vandemataram Srinivas		Sujatha Mohan
2000	Postman	"Nenoka Poola"(Slokam"	Vandemataram Srinivas		
2000	Postman	"Kukku Ku Kokilamma"	Vandemataram Srinivas		K. S. Chithra
2000	Postman	"Oolu Daaralatho"(Slokam)	Vandemataram Srinivas		
2000	Postman	"Ichotane"(Slokam)	Vandemataram Srinivas		
2000	Postman	"Veshamu Vesi"(Slokam)	Vandemataram Srinivas		
2000	Postman	"Rajahamsa Cheera"	Vandemataram Srinivas		K. S. Chithra
2000	Vijayaramaraju	"Maa Kosam"	Vandemataram Srinivas		Swarnalatha
2000	Vijayaramaraju	"Evaru Nuvvu"	Vandemataram Srinivas		
2001	Pandanti Samsaram	"Thaalibottuleni"	Vandemataram Srinivas		K. S. Chithra
2002	Aahuti	"Ningini Egire"	Vandemataram Srinivas		
2002	Hrudayanjali	"Sangamam Mana Sangamam"	L. Vaidyanathan		K. S. Chithra
2002	Kondaveeti Simhasanam	"Ashadaniki Harativa"	Koti		Sujatha Mohan
2002	Premalo Pavani Kalyan	"Thelimanchulona"	Ghantadi Krishna		
2002	Tappu Chesi Pappu Koodu	"Brindavanamali"	M. M. Keeravani		K. S. Chithra
2003	Kalyana Ramudu	"Kathalo Rajakumari"	Mani Sharma		
2003	Tarak	"Alakalu Ela"	Mani Sharma		
2004	Apparao Driving School	"Chirugaali Paata"	Ghantadi Krishna		
2004	Suryam	"Anandham Anandham"	Chakri		
2004	Swarabhishekam	"Anujudai Lakshmanudu"	Vidyasagar		S. P. Balasubrahmanyam
2005	Amma Meedha Ottu	"Amma Neeku Vandhanam"	R. Narayana Murthy		
2005	Aparichithudu	"Jiyangari Inti Sogasa"	Harris Jayaraj		
2005	Kumkuma	"Kaalama Aade Aata"	Ghantadi Krishna		
2006	Adavi Biddalu	"Amaasi Cheekati"	R. Narayana Murthy		
2006	Ganga	"Ellipothunnava Thalli"	Koti		
2007	Aadivaram Aadavallaku Selavu	"Devathavu Neevani"	Vandemataram Srinivas		
2007	Sri Sathyanarayana Swamy	"Bhagavan Bhagavan"	Vandemataram Srinivas		
2008	Andhariki Vandhanalu	"Yendhukayya Neekintha"	Sai Karthik		
2008	Naa Anevaadu	"Premalo"	Saketh Sairam		
2008	Sri Medaram Sammakka Sarakka Mahathyam	"Sathpurushunike"	Vandemataram Srinivas		
2009	Ajantha	"Evarikevarani Raasinodu"	Ilaiyaraaja		
2009	Devarakonda Veerayya Koothuri Kosam	"Thodai Nuvvu Undalamma"	Vandemataram Srinivas		Kalpana Raghavendar
2009	Mestry	"Anaganaga"	Vandemataram Srinivas		K. S. Chithra
2009	Swamy Manikanta	"Agiripai"	Manu Ramesh		
2010	Lava Kusa: The Warrior Twins	"Niliche Sathyam"	L. Vaidyanathan		
2010	Veera Telangana	"Naageti Salallo"	R. Narayana Murthy		
2011	Telugammayi	"Enninaallura"	Vandemataram Srinivas		
2012	26 Kingston	"Idhi Chivariki"	Padma Nabham		
2012	Mithunam	"Aadi Dampathulu"	Swaraveenapani		
2012	Mithunam	"Aata Gada Jananaalu"	Swaraveenapani		
2013	Athade	"Alasina Kanulalu"(Swaram)	Rajamani		
2016	Manalo Okadu	"Kali Kali Kalikaalam"	R. P. Patnaik		
2016	O Malli	"O Malli Bangaru Talli"	Krishna Sai		
2016	O Malli	"Prema Mruthyuvaina"	Krishna Sai		
2017	Head Constable Venkataramayya	"Endukuraa Jeevudaa"	Vandemataram Srinivas		
2018	Saakshyam	"Sivam Sivam"	Harshavardhan Rameshwar		
2018	Saakshyam	"Bhava Maaya"	Harshavardhan Rameshwar		

== Hindi ==
Yesudas's first Hindi song was for the movie Jai Jawan Jai Kisan song Dilruba Kya Hua music scored by A.A. Raj, Anand Mahal (1972) but first released song was in the film Choti Si Baath, both with music scored by Salil Chowdhury, a long-standing collaborator. His most popular Hindi songs are from the 1976 movie Chitchor with music given by Ravindra Jain. The greatest tribute paid to him is cited during an interview with Ravindra Jain, wherein the blind music director confessed that if he ever happened to regain vision, the first person he would like to see was Yesudas. Yesudas's greatest association in Hindi was with Ravindra Jain and the duo combined to produce memorable including Oo Goriya re (from the film Naiyya – directed by Prashanth Nanda),Sunayna (from the film Sunayna). The film in which Yesudas sang the most memorable Hindi songs is claimed to be Sawan Ko Aane Do with music given by the notable late Shri Raj Kamal. His most popular songs include Jaanam, Chand jaise mukhde pe and Tujhe Dekh Kar Jagwale Par (from Saawan Ko Aane Do), Kahan se aaye badra (from Chasme Baddoor), and Ni Sa Ga Ma Pa (from Anand Mahal) etc. His song Surmayee Ankhiyon Mein (from Sadma), penned by Academy Award winner lyricist Gulzar, is one of few notable and melodious song written in Lori prose. Yesudas was also nominated for the Filmfare Award for Best Male Playback Singer thrice: for "Gori Tera Gaon" from Chitchor in 1977, for Ka Karoon Sajni Aye Na Baalam from Swami in 1978, and "Sunayana in Nazaron Ko" from Sunayana and winning the trophy for Dil Ke Tukde Tukde from Dada in 1980.

Hindi music directors who worked with him include Laxmikant–Pyarelal, Raamlaxman, Rajesh Roshan, Khayyam, RD Burman, Bappi Lahiri, Kalyanji-Anandji, Salil Chowdhury, Naushad, Hemant Kumar, Ravi, Ravindra Jain, Raj Kamal and Usha Khanna, SN Tripathi, Anand Milind.

=== Other Languages ===
His film songs in Bengali are major hits. Naam sokuntala taar – Srikanter Will (1979), Path haraabo boley ebaar – Protiggya (1985) and Aar bujhitey parinaa – Debikaa (1985) are his memorable songs with Salil Chowdhury.

He is also familiar to the Oriya film world. Mamataari baalijhaDa and E laakhi jaay dekhi -Batasi Jhada (1981) some hit songs.

His song "Mayechi Sauli" from Marathi film "Nanand Bhavajay" is also hit one. His some other songs from Marathi Films are

1) Duur Duur Jaavuya..... Film:- Mazaa Mulaga (1991)

2) Velivari Umale Kali.....Film:- Mazaa Mulaga (1991)

3) Waara Aala Bhetayala ....Film:- Nanand Bhavajay (1991)

Yesudas have also sung few Tulu language songs. One of his notable song is "Udalda Thudar gu Manas Urkaru" from the film Udalda Thudar in year 1973.

== See also ==
- Dr. K.J.Yesudas
- Carnatic Music
- List of Carnatic singers
- Krishna Nee Begane Baaro
- K. J. Yesudas Tamil discography
