= Tarangini =

Tarangini may refer to:

- Tarangini (music), the most prominent musical compositions of Narayana Teertha
- INS Tarangini, a tall ship of the Indian Navy
- Tharangini Music, a record label and recording studio founded by singer K. J. Yesudas

== See also ==
- Tarang (disambiguation)
- Taranga (disambiguation)
- Tharangam (disambiguation)
- Rajatarangini (lit. 'flow of kings'), a chronicle of the kings of Kashmir and northern India by Kalhana
