= Tarang =

Tarang may refer to:

== Geography ==
- Tarang River Thailand, tributary of the Pa Sak River, part of the Chao Phraya River basin
- Tarang, Afghanistan
- Tarang (Yap), an island in the main harbor of Yap Island, Micronesia

== Percussion instruments ==
- Tabla tarang (Hindi: तबला तरंग) percussion instrument consisting of between ten and sixteen tuned dayan drum
- Jal tarang (Hindi: जल तरंग, Urdu: جل ترنگ, [dʒəl tərəŋg]), ceramic bowls with water
- Kanch tarang, a type of glass harp (see List of Indian musical instruments)
- Loh tarang (Hindi: लोह तरंग), a set of tuned gongs
- Bulbul tarang (Hindi: बुलबुल तरंग), nightingale harp
- Kashtha tarang, a type of xylophone (see List of Indian musical instruments)

== Other ==
- Tarang Chawla (born 1987), Indian-born Australian activist and writer
- Tarang (film), 1984 film directed by Kumar Shahani
- Radio Tarang, former radio station based in Hisar city of Haryana, India
- Tarang TV, Odia-language based general entertainment channels
- Tarang Music, 24-hour music channel owned by Odisha Television Ltd of India
- Young Tarang, third music album of the Pakistani pop duo Nazia and Zoheb
- Tarang Jain (born 1962/63), Indian billionaire businessman

== See also ==
- Taranga (disambiguation)
- Tarangini (disambiguation)
- Tharangam (disambiguation)
- Trang (disambiguation)
