= Taranga =

Taranga (a Sanskrit and Pali word meaning wave) or Tarangalu (the same in Telugu) may refer to:

- Taranga (clothing), a Kashmiri headscarf
- Taranga (film), or Under the Southern Cross, a 1929 American drama
- Taranga (magazine), a weekly Kannada magazine
- Taranga (Māori mythology), the mother of the Māori demigod Māui
- Taranga (Hen) Island, Hen and Chicken Islands, New Zealand
- Taranga, Nepal, a village development committee
- Taranga Jain temple, a pilgrimage site in Gujarat, India
- Taranga Gogoi, Indian politician
- Jeevana Tarangalu, a 1973 Indian drama film by T. Rama Rao
- Prema Tarangalu, a 1980 Indian film

== See also ==
- Tarang (disambiguation)
- Tarangini (disambiguation)
- Tharangam (disambiguation)
- Trang (disambiguation)
- Tharanga, a Sinhala male given name
