= Tharangam =

Tharangam may mean:

- Tarangini (music), the most prominent musical compositions of Narayana Teertha, the 17th century Carnatic music composer
- Tharangam (1979 film), a 1979 Indian Malayalam film, directed by Baby
- Tharangam (2017 film), The Curious Case of Kallan Pavithran, a Malayalam black comedy thriller film directed by Dominic Arun

== See also ==
- Tarang (disambiguation)
- Taranga (disambiguation)
- Tarangini (disambiguation)
