= Maduve Aagona Baa =

2001 film by V. S. Reddy

- Directed by: V S Reddy
- Written by: Bhoopathi Raja
- Based on: Pellichesukundam (1997)
- Produced by: D. Rama Naidu
- Starring: Shivarajkumar; Laya; Shilpi
- Cinematography: V Prathap
- Edited by: Shyam
- Music by: Koti-M. M. Srilekha
- Production company: Suresh Productions
- Release date: 1 February 2001
- Country: India
- Language: Kannada

Maduve Aagona Baa (transl. Come let us marry) is 2001 Kannada-language film starring Shivarajkumar, Laya, and Shilpi. It was a remake of Telugu film Pellichesukundam (1997)

== Plot ==
The film is about a rape victim sheltered by a kind hearted businessman who happens to be her former boss.

== Cast ==
- Shiva Rajkumar as Anand
- Laya as Shanthi
- Shilpi
- Sumithra
- Srilalitha
- Vanishree
- Sundar Raj
- Rekha Das
- Sanketh Kashi
- Rajitha Choudary
- Sadhu Kokila
- Meghana
- Mandya Ramesh
- Devishree
- Sharan
- Radha Prashanthi
- Raman Panjabi
- Arasikere Raju
- Shivaram
- Ramya
- Devan
- Amoolya
- Mohanraj
- Baby Nandini
- Venkatesh Prasad
- Master Vijay
- Ramakrishna

== Soundtrack ==
The music was composed by Koti-Srilekha and released by Akash Audio. All lyrics were penned by K. Kalyan. The audio was launched at 16 December 2001 at Malleswaram grounds, Bangalore.

Maduve Aagona Baa

Soundtrack album by Koti-Srilekha
- Released: Feb 9, 2001
- Recorded: 2001
- Genre: Soundtrack
- Length: 27:31
- Label: Akash Audio
- Producer: Koti-Srilekha

Track list
No.	Title	Singer(s)	Length
1.	"America Baby"	S. P. Balasubrahmanyam, Swarnalatha	4:35
2.	"A B C D Vayasu"	S. P. Balasubrahmanyam, M. M. Srilekha	4:17
3.	"Chilaka Paapa"	S. P. Balasubrahmanyam, K. S. Chithra	4:15
4.	"Sahaara"	Srinivas, M. M. Srilekha	4:10
5.	"Hogaya Mein"	S. P. Balasubrahmanyam, K. S. Chithra	5:13
6.	"Hogaya Mein"	Mano	5:01
Total length:			27:31

== Reception ==
A critic from Online Bangalore wrote that "Although a remake, it is a good one. It is a movie with a message and stands out from the regular love triangles".
