= Sri Krishna Leela Tarangini =

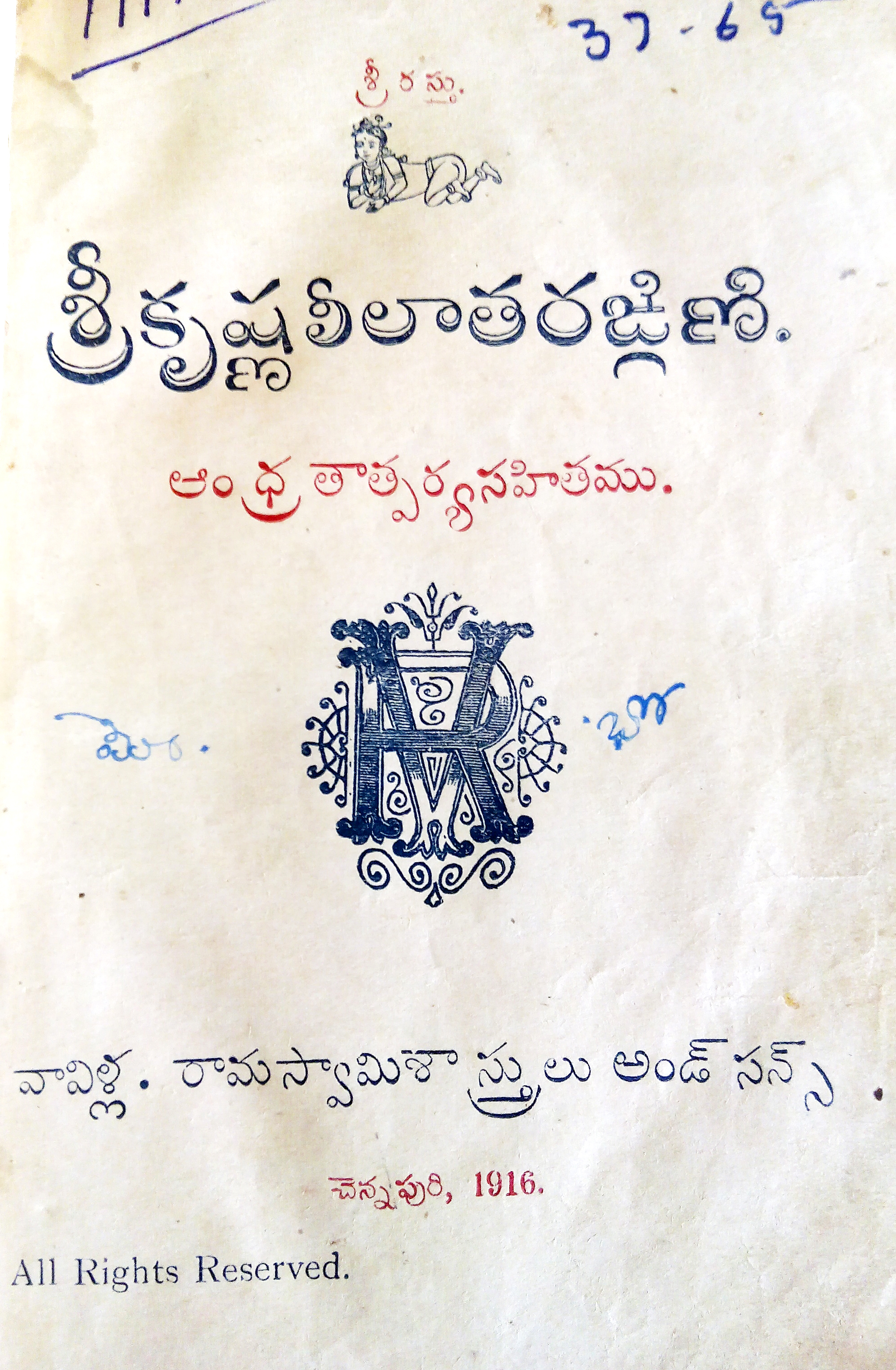
Sri Krishna Leela Tarangini book cover in Telugu script.

Sri Krishna Leela Tarangini is a tarangini or a Sanskrit opera authored by Narayana Teertha. The songs are in chaste Sanskrit and clear diction and are rich in poetic quality. Tarangini is an opera highly suitable for dance drama and it has been very well utilized by Indian classical dancers over the last two centuries. Tarangini consists of 12 Tarangams and encapsulates 153 songs, 302 slokams and 31 choornikaas. Teertha followed Veda Vyasa’s Bhagavatam and concentrated on the 10th skandam.

== Contents ==
The composition are on the life of the Hindu god Lord Krishna. It deals with the life story of Krishna starting with his birth, childhood pranks and ending with his marriage to Rukmini. Narayan Theertha uses various literary and musical forms such as songs, prose passages, Slokas (praises in verse), Dwipadis (couplets), etc. The songs are popularly called "Tarangas" means waves. The lyrics are simple yet beautiful and effective. The Astapadis of Jayadeva are said to be the inspiration. The tarangams are popular piece in Kuchipudi dance, where the dancers dance on brass plates maintaining complex rhythms.

Legend has it that the inspiration to compose this piece occurred when he was along the banks of Naducauvery. He was suffering from a serious stomach ailment and prayed that he should be given the strength to go back to Tirupati, where it all started. A divine voice asked him to follow a boar (varaha) to wherever it led him. The varaha led him to Bhupatirajapuram, which came to be known as `Varahur' later. The people of the village knew that a maha-purusha was coming. With their help, he rebuilt the temple for Sri Lakshmi Narayana and Lord Venkateswara and settled down on the banks of the Kudamurutti River, a tributary of the river Kaveri.

Aradhana sabhas by Narayana Tirthar Trust are held annually in honour of the Tarangini.
