= Sitaron Mein Tu Hi =

2000 Hindi-language album by Lalit

Studio album by Lalit
- Released: 2000
- Genre: Indian pop
- Length: 57:45
- Label: Universal Music India

Sitaron Mein Tu Hi is a 2000 Hindi studio album by Indian musician Lalit of Jatin–Lalit duo. It was released 2000 by Universal Music India. It is one of Yesudas's hit music albums. There are 10 tracks in this album. All songs were penned by Mehboob. The album's theme is separation. That is why many tunes are melancholic. Relationships are torn asunder by circumstances or by death. All songs except two echo this feeling of loss.

== Development ==
Shivaji Gupta of Universal Music wanted Yesudas to do his new album. But Yesudas told him that he would not want to sing certain kinds of songs like pop. Yesudas then met the composer, Lalit, and liked his compositions.

Later, Lalit told that he had composed most of these songs in the 1970s. It was Lalit's desire to have Yesudas to sing them. Lalit insisted that if Yesudas did not agree to do that, they would never be recorded.

== Track listing ==
#	Song	Singer(s)	Length
1	Chamak Cham Cham	K. J. Yesudas	5:32
2	Ishq Mushq	K. J. Yesudas	6:54
3	Tu Jaan Hai	K. J. Yesudas	4:46
4	Door Humse	K. J. Yesudas	6:12
5	Sajni	K. J. Yesudas	5:45
6	Tujh Se Bichhad Ke	K. J. Yesudas	5:55
7	Man Mohini	K. J. Yesudas	4:39
8	Itna Bhi	K. J. Yesudas	6:57
9	Dosti	K. J. Yesudas	6:06
10	Sanwali Saloni	K. J. Yesudas	4:56

== See also ==
- K. J. Yesudas discography
