= Vamsoddharakudu =

- Theatrical release poster
- Directed by: Sarath
- Screenplay by: Sarath
- Story by: Paruchuri Brothers
- Produced by: M. S. Reddy; T. Subbarami Reddy (presents)
- Starring: Nandamuri Balakrishna; Krishnam Raju; Sakshi Shivanand; Ramya Krishna
- Cinematography: V. S. R. Swamy
- Edited by: K. V. Krishna Reddy
- Music by: Koti
- Production company: Gayatri Films
- Release date: 14 January 2000
- Running time: 153 minutes
- Country: India
- Language: Telugu

Vamsoddharakudu (transl. Heir) is a 2000 Indian Telugu-language drama film directed by Sarath. It stars Nandamuri Balakrishna, Ramya Krishna, Sakshi Shivanand, Krishnam Raju with music composed by Koti. It was produced by M. S. Reddy under the Gayatri Films banner. The film was not successful at the Andhra Pradesh and Telangana box offices.

== Plot ==
Suryam is a gallant firing up in the office of a great industrialist, Rajagaru. An intense conflict arises when Suryam shoots Rajagaru, who is critical in the hospital. Following, Anand and Ashok, the vagabond sons of Rajagaru, bribe a wicked cop to finish apprehending Suryam. As per their steering, he stirs him to the remote area for an encounter. Nevertheless, Surya batters them, absconds into the forest and spins rearward. Sudarshan Rao, a malice brother-in-law of Rajagaru, predominates over his property and makes his sons puppets. Suryam acquired a physical director (PD) job at his college and lives with his widowed mother, Varalakshmi. He always contretemps with the vainglory Sudarshan Rao's daughter, Surekha, and they crush. Charming Satya joins as Suryam's junior and entices him, but in vain.

Once, they move on a college tour when Satya implicates Suryam in the rape case. Subsequently, the college committee decides that Suryam should knit her. Suryam imparts the truth via Satya that it is a wink of Sudarshan Rao to create a rift between the turtle doves. Plus, she has done it to rescue her ailing father, Sambasiva Rao. Enraged, Sudarshan Rao reaches Suryam's residence and gets startled by witnessing Varalakshmi. This minute, Sudarshan Rao accepts the marriage of the two, provided he expects an answer from Suryam that his father is alive and why his mother is living like a widow. Being mindful, Suryam stuns, rushes to his mother, and learns Rajagaru is his father. In the interim, terminally ill Sambasiva Rao spots Varalakshmi and lands there with incredible difficulty since he is one of the accomplices and divulges the past.

Twenty-five years ago, Varalakshmi was a maid at Rajagaru's residence when his wedding arrangements were afoot with Sudarshan Rao's sister. One night, Pandu, the cousin of Varalakshmi, commits a theft when he accidentally dies at the hands of Rajagaru. To secure him, Varalakshmi incriminates herself. Rajagaru acquits and splices Varalakshmi, unbeknownst of her kin, with Pandu. Exploiting it, begrudged Sudarshan Rao cabals on Varalakshmi's pregnant ceremony Seemantham mingling Sambasiva Rao by blemishing her chastity. Hence, Rajagaru decrees she should live as a widow by removing her wedding chain Mangalsutra, bangles, and sectarian mark Bottu.

Presently unfolding his sin, Sambasiva Rao passes away, leaving his daughter's responsibility to Suryam. Before the delay, Suryam approaches his father. Parallelly, Anand raids Rajagaru to grab the money for whitewashing his mistake in the trade. However, Suryam safeguards him and helps him attain a position in his company. Step by step, he wins his laurels and procures a post for Satya as an indebtedness to her father when she genuinely loves him. Sudarshan Rao forcibly transits Surekha to Rajagaru's residence, where two flies persist in their love, making Satya back up.

Meanwhile, Rajagaru is aware of Anand's scam, which has turned his reputation upside down. After a while, Ashok tries to molest Satya, and Suryam shields her when Rajagaru kicks him out. Grief-stricken Rajagaru shares with Suryam that he did not possess a virtuous heir. Moreover, he embraces him and states that getting a son like him is a boon, which makes Suryam cloud nine. Next, Sudarshan Rao senses Suryam's presence at his father. Immediately, he rushes to engage Sirisha with Anand and warns Varalakshmi, who hinders Suryam. Anyhow, Satya pauses it, brings the fact to light, and proves the eminence of Varalakshmi.

Rajagaru feels remorseful and advances to Varalakshmi but hesitates due to his sons. Hence, furious Suryam assaulted the office. Indeed, anguished Rajagaru attempted suicide, and Suryam tried to arrest him, but it was too late. As of today, Sudarshan Rao wiles by issuing shoot-at-sight orders for Suryam. Knowing it, Rajagaru wakes up and moves to the forest with Satya and Surekha. After a fierce fight, Suryam ceases the baddies and reforms his brothers, but Satya dies while shielding him. At last, Rajagaru bestows sectarian marks, bangles, and wedding chains to Varalakshmi. Finally, the film ends on a happy note with the marriage of Suryam and Surekha.

== Cast ==
- Nandamuri Balakrishna as Suryam
- Krishnam Raju as Raja
- Ramya Krishna as Satya
- Sakshi Shivanand as Surekha
- Charan Raj as Sudarshan Rao
- Srihari as Shrikant
- Brahmaji as Anand
- Ravi Babu as Ashok
- Brahmanandam as Hanumantu / Anjibabu (dual role)
- Babu Mohan as Dalapati
- M. S. Narayana as lecturer
- Chalapathi Rao as Pandu's father
- Giri Babu as Satya's father
- Surya as Pandu
- Ramaraju as Police Inspector
- Radhika as Varalakshmi
- Rama Prabha as Surekha's grandmother
- Jayalalita as Ramulamma
- Varsha as Suryam's sister
- Priya as Sudarshan Rao's sister
- Srilakshmi as Mangamma
- Kalpana Rai as warden
- Y. Vijaya as Gangamma

== Music ==
Vamsoddharakudu

Film score by Koti
- Released: 2000
- Genre: Soundtrack
- Length: 26:51
- Label: Supreme Music
- Producer: Koti

Koti chronology
Krishna Babu (1999)	Vamsoddharakudu (2000)	Goppinti Alludu (2000)

Music was composed by Koti. Music released on Supreme Music Company.

No.	Title	Lyrics	Singer(s)	Length
1.	"Kondapalli Bomma"	Ghantadi Krishna	S. P. Balasubrahmanyam, Chitra	4:09
2.	"Andala Prayam"	Sirivennela Sitarama Sastry	S. P. Balasubrahmanyam, Chitra	4:21
3.	"Gudi Gantalu"	Mallemala	S. P. Balasubrahmanyam, Chitra	5:22
4.	"Budi Budi Chinukula"	Bhuvanachandra	Ramu, Chitra	3:50
5.	"Dole Dole"	Bhuvanachandra	Udit Narayan, Sujatha	3:47
6.	"Nee Choopu Bhale"	Suddala Ashok Teja	S. P. Balasubrahmanyam, Chitra	4:23
Total length:				26:51
