= David O'Keefe (ship captain) =

- Born: 1824
- Died: 1901 (aged 76–77); Returning to Savannah, Georgia
- Occupation: Ship captain
- Known for: Historical and political figure on the South Pacific island of Yap

David Dean O'Keefe (1824 or 1828 – 1901) was an Irish-American ship captain who became a historical and political figure on the Western Pacific island of Yap.

O'Keefe emigrated to the United States in 1848 and established himself in Savannah, Georgia. In 1871 he captained a ship to the Western Pacific. After landing on Yap he became powerful by using tools from Hong Kong and East Asia to more easily create Rai stones; however, the ease of making the stone money ultimately helped lead to its decline during the period of German rule. Still the wealth allowed him to own an island, of which he was considered "king". Reportedly he had his own emblem, which showed the US flag waving over the letters "O K." He took two Yapese wives, despite already having a wife and daughter in Savannah.

In 1901 he died on the ship Santa Cruz returning to Savannah.

His Majesty O'Keefe is the story of O'Keefe's life on Yap. A film of the same name starring Burt Lancaster was made in 1954.

== See also ==
- O'Keefe's Island, where his home was located in Yap Harbor
