= Narayana Teertha =

Hindu saint and composer

- Born: Tallavajula Govinda Sastrulu; 1650
- Origin: Khaza, Guntur, India
- Died: 1745 (aged 94–95)
- Genre: Carnatic music
- Occupation: Carnatic music composer

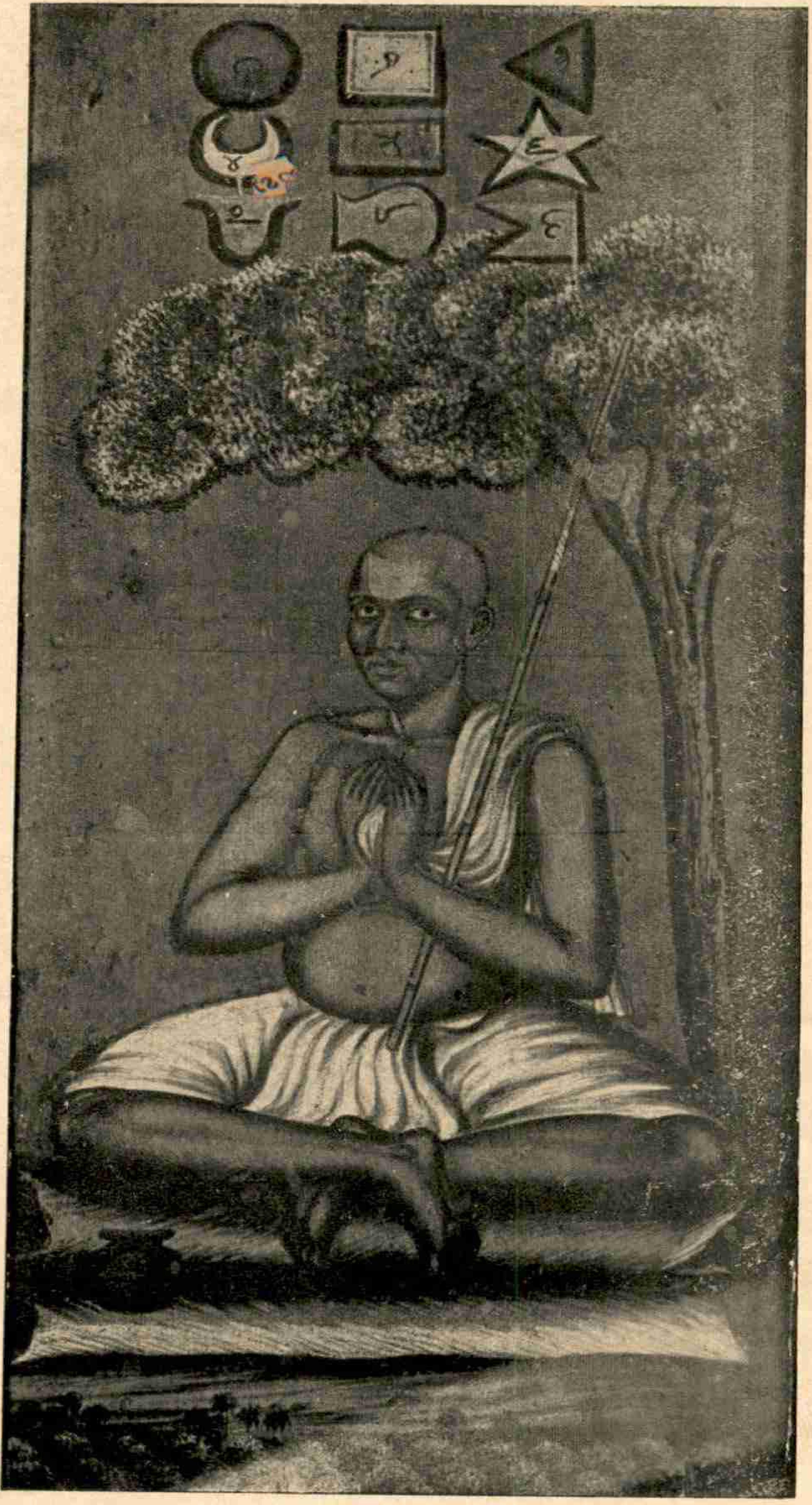
Narayana Tirtha from Grandhalaya Sarvasvamu

Narayana Teertha (c. 1650 – 1745 CE) was a Hindu saint and composer, known to be a devotee of the deity Krishna.

== Biography ==
Narayana Teertha was born in South India in the region covered by the present-day Andhra Pradesh. He lived in Kaza, Guntur district near Mangalagiri. He belonged to Tallavarjula family. His birth name was Govinda Sastrulu. They eventually moved to Thanjavur, Tamil Nadu.

While there is significant dissention as to his exact time, historians place him between 1610 and 1745 AD. An extensive research done with the help of archives preserved in Saraswati Mahal Library has helped place the time closer to 1650 AD – 1745 AD, and he reportedly lived a long life.

He mastered music at a very early age and studied Puranas, Srimad Bhagavatam and other Sanskrit works. He renounced family at a very early age and took on a life of a religious devotion. He went to Varanasi to spread his philosophy.

Teertha was very well versed in Music and, Natya Shastra, and a great scholar in Sanskrit. He used at least 34 popular ragas. He used Triputa, Adi, Rupaka, Chapu, Jampa, Matya, Vilamba, Eka and Ata taalams. Many of the songs are structurally well set for direct use as nritya or natya padams. He carefully avoided complex usages and utilized easy expressions. His Gadyams and Padyams are exquisite in beauty. He used 17 different Chandas or meters such as Anushtup, Arya, Indravajra, Bhujangaprayadam, Shardula vikriditam, Vasanta tilaka, Prithvi.

He wrote 15 books and some of them are available in Benares Hindu University and Parijatapaharanam at Saraswathi Mahal in Tanjore. He is also credited with composing two other operas, Parijaa Apaharanam and Haribhakti Sudharnavam.

Narayana Teertha received divine blessings at Varagur in Thanjavur District. His mukthi sthalam (place of eternity) is at Varagur. Although he lived in Varahur, Narayana Teertha attained Siddhi in 1745 at a nearby village called Thirupoonthuruthy under a huge mango tree, on the banks of Kudamurutti River, on the Masi Sukla Ashtami, Guruvaram, Krithika Nakshatram day. It is said that he attained 'Jeeva Samadhi' (even while alive). A small shrine has been constructed on this hallowed spot, under the sprawling mango tree.

== Sri Krishna Leela Tarangini ==
Narayana Teertha was the author of a Sanskrit opera called Sri Krishna Leela Tarangini on the life of the Krishna. It deals with the various pastimes of Krishna, starting from describing his various avataras, to his birth, childhood pastimes (Bala Leelas) and ending with his marriage to Rukmini. Narayana Teertha uses various literary and musical forms such as songs, prose passages, slokas (praises in verse), dwipadis (couplets), etc. The songs are popularly called "Tarangas" means waves. The lyrics are simple yet beautiful and effective. The Gita Govinda of Jayadeva Goswami is said to be the inspiration. The Gita Govinda of Jayadeva Goswami, Krishna Karnamritam of Sri Bilvamangalacharya, and the Krishna Leela Tarangini of Narayana Teertha are said to be the 'three gems' in medieval Vaishnava literature describing the deity's various pastimes and plays.

Legend has it that the inspiration to compose this piece occurred when he was along the banks of Naducauvery. He was suffering from a serious stomach ailment and prayed that he should be given the strength to go back to Tirupati, where it all started. A divine voice asked him to follow a boar (Varaha) to wherever it led him. The Varaha led him to Bhupatirajapuram, which came to be known as `Varagur' (meaning 'Varaha' or boar, and 'Ur' or village) later. The boar which guided Narayana Teertha to Bhupatirajapuram was no ordinary boar, but Lord Varaha (the boar-form of Krishna) himself. The people of the village knew that a great personality was coming, due to many auspicious omens. With their help, he re-built the beautiful Sri Lakshmi-Narayana temple, Navaneetha Krishna and Sri Srinivasa (Venkateshwara) (which were there in the village) and settled down on the banks of river 'Kudamurutty' the name by which the Cauvery was known at this place.

Tarangini is an opera highly suitable for dance drama and it has been very well utilized by Indian classical dancers, especially in Kuchipudi over the last two centuries. Tarangini consists of 12 Tarangams and encapsulates 153 songs, 302 slokams and 31 choornikaas. Teertha followed Veda VyAsa's Bhagavatam and concentrated on the 10th skandam.

== Other works ==
- Subodhinī – a treatise (in Sanskrit) on Brahma Sutra śaṅkara Bhāṣyam;
- Vivaraṇa Dīpika (in Telugu), a treatise on Panchīkaraṇa vartika of Sureshwarāchārya;
- Pārijātāpaharaṇam, the well known Yakshaganam in Telugu
- Hari Bhakti Sudhārṇavam, and
- Śāṇdilya bhakti sūtra vyākyānam

== Popular compositions ==
Some of the popular compositions are listed here:

1. Jaya jaya swāmin jaya jaya
2. Jaya jaya ramā nātha
3. Śaraṇaṃ bhava
4. Nārāyaṇāya
5. Maṅgalālayāya mamava deva
6. Jaya jaya durgē jita vairi vargē
7. Bāla gōpāla kṛṣṇa pāhi !
8. Bāla gōpāla māṃ uddhara ! kṛṣṇa
9. Mādhava Māmava deva
10. Ehi mudaṃ dehi kṛṣṇa
11. Ehi mudaṃ mama
12. kṛṣṇaṃ kalaya ! sakhi sundaraṃ
13. Kalaya yaśode
14. Dāmodara tāvaka
15. Govinda ghataya paramanandam
16. Alokaye śri Bālakṛṣṇaṃ
17. Pasyata pasyata
18. Jaya jaya gokulabala jaya sakalagama moola
19. Deva deva praseeda
20. Neela megha sareera
21. Pahi pahi jagan
22. Deva kuru Siksham
23. Shree Gopālaka
24. Ayahi vraja
1. Govardhana
2. Nanda nandana
3. Parama purusha
4. Pūraya mama kāmaṃ
5. vada kiṃ karavāṇi
6. Mādhava māmava
7. Govindaṃ iha
8. Nanda nandana
9. Kathaya kathaya
10. Bhavaye
11. Vijaya Gopala
12. Pahi pahi mam
13. Shiva shiva bhava sharanam
14. Vedadri shikhara nṛsimhaṃ
15. Vekshe kada devadevam gopalamoortim
16. Re re Manasa
17. Gopala Meva daivatam
18. Kalyanam bhavatu
19. jaya jaya bala gopala
20. Alokaye rukmini kalyana gopalam
21. jaya mangalam
22. Kshemam kuru Gopala
23. param karunaya mam palaya

== Aradhana ==
Narayana Teertha Trust of Kaja, at the birthplace of Saint Narayana Teertha celebrated his 264th aradhana. As a part of the celebrations, guru pooja, morning worship, sahasranama chanting, vedic renditions and tarangam singing were conducted. Bhajan troupes from various parts of the State rendered tarangams with devotion.

Specially residents and devotees of Varagur village (Thirukkattupalli, Tanjore) celebrate Tharangini Mahotsav every year on 25 & 26 January, all popular artists are performing Tharangam in front of Lord Venkateswara Perumal who has given Darshan to Sri Narayana Theerthar. Later on Sri Narayana Theerthar, the composer of Krishna Leela Tharangini, attained mukti at Varagur. The devotees of Thirupoonthuruti have been organising music festivals at the Samadhi shrine for over 300 years, at Tirupoonthuruti on Masi Sukla Ashtami Day.
