= His Majesty O'Keefe =

1954 film by Byron Haskin

- Directed by: Byron Haskin
- Screenplay by: Borden Chase; James Hill
- Based on: His Majesty O'Keefe; 1950 novel by Lawrence Klingman; Gerald Green
- Produced by: Harold Hecht
- Starring: Burt Lancaster; Joan Rice; André Morell; Abraham Sofaer
- Cinematography: Otto Heller
- Edited by: Manuel del Campo
- Music by: Dimitri Tiomkin (original score); Robert Farnon (alternate score: UK release)
- Production company: Norma Productions
- Distributed by: Warner Bros. Pictures
- Release date: January 16, 1954 (United States)
- Running time: 91 minutes
- Country: United States
- Language: English
- Budget: $1.5 million
- Box office: $2.5 million (US & Canada rentals)

His Majesty O'Keefe is a 1954 American adventure film directed by Byron Haskin and starring Burt Lancaster. The cast also included Joan Rice, André Morell, Abraham Sofaer, Archie Savage, and Benson Fong. The screenplay by Borden Chase and James Hill was based on the novel of the same name by Laurence Klingman and Gerald Green (1952).

== Plot ==
Captain David O'Keefe, seeking his fortune in the 19th century South Pacific, decides to enlist island natives to harvest copra, but runs into a wall of cultural problems. Backed by a Chinese dentist, he obtains a ship and sets about harvesting copra while fending off cantankerous native chieftains and ambitious German empire-builders. The natives, happy with their existence, see no reason to work hard to obtain copra, either for a German trading company or for O'Keefe. He finally motivates them by showing them how to produce large quantities of Rai stones, the stone money of Yap, and their valued coinage.

== Cast ==
- Burt Lancaster as Captain David O'Keefe / Narrator
- Joan Rice as Dalabo "Dali" Harris, mixed-race woman who is O'Keefe's love interest
- André Morell as Alfred Tetens
- Abraham Sofaer as Fatumak, Medicine Man
- Charles Horvath as Bully Hayes
- Lloyd Berrell as Inifel
- Grant Taylor at Lt. Brenner
- Guy Doleman as Herr Weber
- Tessa Prendergast as Kakofel
- Harvey Adams as Herr Friedlander
- Muriel Steinbeck
- Philip Ahn as Sien Tang, dentist and O'Keefe's partner
- Benson Fong as Mr. Chou
- Archie Savage as Boogulroo
- Max Osbiston
- Alexander Archdale

== Historical basis ==
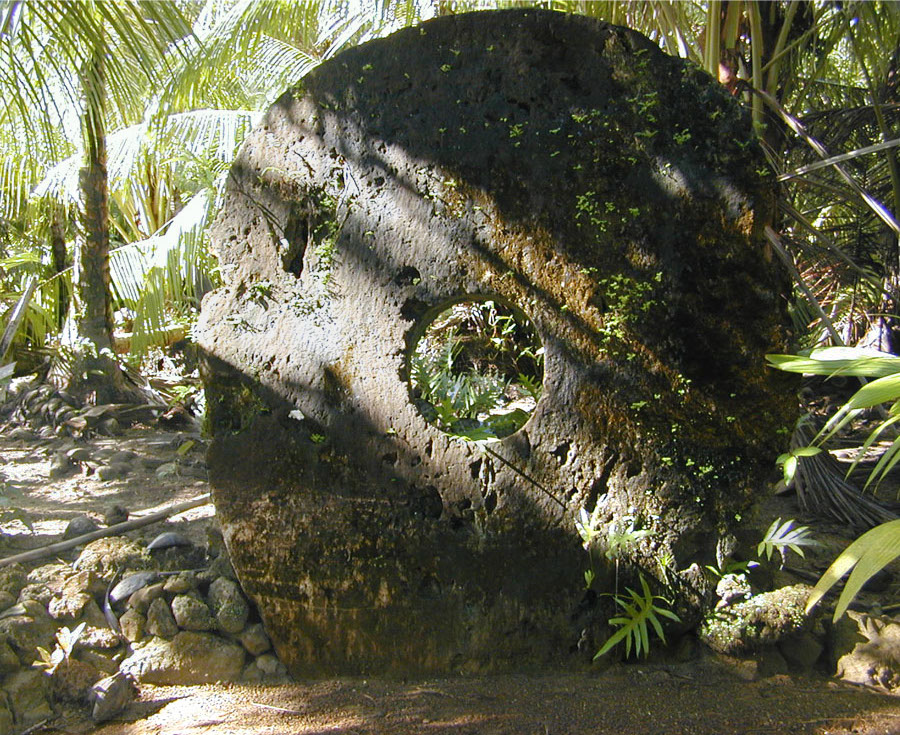
An 8-foot "coin" from the village of Gachpar, on Yap.

The story is based on the life of a sailor named David O'Keefe who in 1871 was shipwrecked on Yap in the Caroline Islands, where he found the natives highly prized Rai stones quarried at great effort and danger on the island of Palau. He organized the natives to produce the large stone disks by employing modern methods and then used them to buy copra for coconut oil. The stones he produced were not valued as highly as those obtained by traditional methods due to the lack of personal sacrifice in their production, and the effect of an inflationary over-production.

== Production ==
=== Original book ===
O'Keefe's life was turned into a 1950 book by Lawrence Klingman and Gerard Green. The Los Angeles Times said the writers did "a magnificent job". The Chicago Tribune called it a "well told story". The New York Times called it "interesting" and "curious".

=== Development ===
Film rights were optioned in December 1950 by Norma Productions, the company of Harold Hecht and Burt Lancaster.

In April 1951 Lancaster announced Fred Zinnemann would direct. Lancaster was very busy at this time in his career and the film was not made immediately. In January 1952 Frank Nugent was reported as working on the script. In May 1952 Byron Haskin signed to direct.

The film would be the last in a three-picture deal between Norma Productions and Warner Bros. The others had been The Flame and the Arrow and The Crimson Pirate.

=== Pre-production ===
Haskin arrived in Sydney, Australia in June 1952 and five Australian actors had roles in the supporting cast, including Lloyd Berrell, Guy Doleman, Muriel Steinbeck, Grant Taylor and Harvey Adams.

Max Osbiston was offered a role but turned it down due to his film commitments.

Later in June Haskin moved to Fiji where the bulk of the movie was shot.

The film was made with "frozen" English funds, so many English technicians and cast were used and it was decided to shoot on location in Fiji, a British colony at the time.

Joan Rice was cast in July 1952.

=== Shooting ===
Filming took four months, mostly on location in the South Pacific in Fiji – not Yap. Also, indigenous people and customs/dances portrayed in the movie were Fijian.

The choreographer was Daniel Nagrin.

The unit was based at the Beachcomber Hotel at Deuba Beach in Viti Levu. The entire village of Goloa five miles west of the hotel was rented. Two miles east of Deuba the unit built a temporary sound stage as well as a darkroom and lab. The village was handed over to the locals after the unit left

"I can't say that we'd ever want to remake O'Keefe," said Lancaster later. "It was so tough working in the humidity that one day I actually watched fungus grow on my clothes. Every day blazing sun or tropical rain beat down upon us and at night there were always mosquitos."

Haskin spoke highly of Australian actors saying:

American actors are hothouse plants by comparison because they don't have such an exacting apprenticeship as Australian radio and repertory give. Few of the unknowns we try out can pick up any script and do any kind of part with out rehearsal. But your boys can. And they don't mess about. Put them up in front of a camera and they get on with what's required of them.

Filming finished in November 1952.

== Reception ==
The film was popular. According to Kinematograph Weekly the film was a "money maker" at the British box office in 1954.

However Warner Bros were unhappy by the fact it went over budget. Hecht and Lancaster later welcomed His Majesty O'Keefe's screenwriter, James Hill, as an equal partner and renamed their company Hecht-Hill-Lancaster Productions in 1956.

== Legacy ==
The film prompted Guy Doleman to go to Hollywood.

Director Byron Haskin later returned to Australia to make Long John Silver (1954).
