= Srimathi Vellostha =

- DVD cover
- Directed by: K. Raghavendra Rao
- Written by: M. V. S. Haranatha Rao (dialogues)
- Screenplay by: K. Raghavendra Rao
- Story by: Bhupathi Raja
- Produced by: C. Venkataraju; G. Sivaraju
- Starring: Jagapati Babu; Devayani; Poonam Singar
- Cinematography: Navakanth
- Edited by: Gautham Raju
- Music by: Koti
- Production company: Geeta Chitra International
- Release date: 25 September 1998
- Running time: 135 minutes
- Country: India
- Language: Telugu

Srimathi Vellostha (transl. Wife! I Will Be Back) is a 1998 Telugu-language drama film, produced by C. Venkataraju, G. Sivaraju under the Geeta Chitra International banner and directed by K. Raghavendra Rao. The film stars Jagapati Babu, Devayani, Poonam and music composed by Koti.

== Plot ==
The film begins with Ravi, a young charm, attending his friend Deepa Brahma's wedding, where he crushes on a beautiful Madhumati. However, things worsen when his father fixes his alliance with his friend's daughter, Kanchana, and forcibly knits her. On their first night, Ravi decides to open before Kanchana. Startlingly, Kanchana reveals her love story with Rajendra, who used to be their tenant. She, too, faced the same succumbing and wedded Ravi. Forthwith, Ravi & Kanchana can be tailored and agonized because of haunts. So, they seek divorce to perform nuptials with their respective love interests. According to the Hindu Marriage Act, newlyweds must wait at least a year before filing for divorce. Hence, the couple lives with each other. In this period, love blossoms between them. The rest of the story is about whether they divorce or not.

== Cast ==
- Jagapati Babu as Ravi
- Devayani as Kanchana
- Poonam Singar as Madhumati
- Babloo Prithiveeraj as Rajendra
- Brahmanandam as Dippa Brahmam
- Sudhakar as Ravi's friend
- Tanikella Bharani as Lawyer Mamaiah
- M. S. Narayana
- Babu Mohan as Dippa Brahmam's father
- Ahuti Prasad as Kanchana's father
- Raghunatha Reddy as Ravi's father
- Ananth Babu as Servant
- Chitti Babu
- Gundu Hanumantha Rao as Dippa Brahmam's father-in-law
- Uttej as Ravi's friend
- Jayasudha as Judge
- Sudha as Kanchana's mother
- Siva Parvati as Ravi's mother
- Rajitha as Lawyer Mamaiah's wife
- Ragini as Balanagamma, Dippa Brahmam's wife
- Saraswatamma

== Soundtrack ==
Srimathi Vellostha

Film score by Koti
- Released: 1998
- Genre: Soundtrack
- Length: 28:06
- Label: Aditya Music
- Producer: Koti

Koti chronology
Snehitulu (1998)	Srimathi Vellostha (1998)	Sultan (1999)

The soundtrack was composed by Koti and was released on Aditya Music.

Track list
No.	Title	Lyrics	Singer(s)	Length
1.	"Nee Pedhavulatho"	Sirivennela Seetharama Sastry	S. P. Balasubrahmanyam, K. S. Chithra	4:34
2.	"Apsarasaa Apsarasa"	Chandrabose	S. P. Balasubrahmanyam, K. S. Chithra	4:40
3.	"Gala Gala Paare"	Sirivennela Seetharama Sastry	S. P. Balasubrahmanyam, K. S. Chithra	4:27
4.	"Vanamaali Vanamaali"	Chandrabose	S. P. Balasubrahmanyam, K. S. Chithra	4:54
5.	"Andhamaina"	Sirivennela Seetharama Sastry	K. J. Yesudas	4:56
6.	"Tirupathilo Yenaado"	Chandrabose	S. P. Balasubrahmanyam, K. S. Chithra	4:38
Total length:				28:10

== Reception ==
Rakesh P. of the Deccan Herald wrote that "On the whole the movie is a drag".
