= Krishna Babu =

1999 Indian film by Muthyala Subbaiah

- DVD cover
- Directed by: Muthyala Subbaiah
- Written by: Thotapalli Madhu (dialogues)
- Screenplay by: Muthyala Subbaiah
- Story by: Chanti Addala
- Produced by: Chanti Addala; V. Srinivasa Reddy
- Starring: Nandamuri Bala Krishna; Meena; Abbas; Raasi
- Cinematography: V. Srinivasa Reddy
- Edited by: V. Nagi Reddy
- Music by: Koti
- Production company: Srinivasa Arts
- Release date: 16 September 1999
- Running time: 126 minutes
- Country: India
- Language: Telugu

Krishna Babu is a 1999 Indian Telugu-language drama film, produced by Chanti Addala under the Srinivasa Productions banner and directed by Muthyala Subbaiah. It stars Nandamuri Balakrishna, Abbas, Meena, Raasi and music composed by Koti. It was the 75th film of Balakrishna as an actor.

== Cast ==
- Nandamuri Balakrishna as Krishna Babu
- Abbas as Vijay
- Meena as Rama
- Raasi as Shilpa
- Chandra Mohan as Chandraiah
- Kota Srinivasa Rao
- Rami Reddy as Sarva Rayudu
- Satya Prakash
- Ranganath
- Narra Venkateswara Rao as Jailor
- AVS
- M. S. Narayana
- Sivaji Raja
- Suthivelu
- Rama Prabha
- Rajitha
- Delhi Rajeswari
- Master Anand Vardhan

== Soundtrack ==
Krishna Babu

Film score by Koti
- Released: 1999
- Genre: Soundtrack
- Length: 29:31
- Label: Supreme Music
- Producer: Koti

Koti chronology
Sultan (1999)	Krishna Babu (1999)	Vamshoddharakudu (2000)

Music composed by Koti. Music released on Supreme Music Company.

No.	Title	Lyrics	Singer(s)	Length
1.	"Sakhi Masthu Masthu"	Chandrabose	Udit Narayan, Sujatha	4:49
2.	"Muddula Paapa"	Samavedam Shanmukha Sarma	S. P. Balasubrahmanyam, Swarnalatha	5:18
3.	"Hello Miss"	Surendra Krishna	Koti, Harini	5:20
4.	"Prema Patasalalo"	Chandrabose	Udit Narayan, Sujatha	5:08
5.	"Pampara Panasamma"	Veturi	S. P. Balasubrahmanyam, Chitra	5:00
6.	"O Manasa"	Sirivennela Sitarama Sastry	K. J. Yesudas	4:50
Total length:				29:31

== Release ==
Idlebrain wrote "The team of Balaiah - Muthyala - Chanti made sure that they hit the bulls eye this time. Full credit goes to all these three people for choosing a sensible story line and sticking to story than preferring to the towering mass persona of post-SSR Balaiah. You can see only characters in this film, not artists. There are a few loopholes in the story and the credit goes to Muthayala for narrating story in such a fascinating style". A critic from Sify wrote that "The entire movie`s strongpoint lies in the second half of the film. In their attempt at aiming for a hat-trick after the commercial success of Inspector Pratap and Pavithra Prema, the combination of Balakrishna and Muthyala Subbiah have taken extra care in the treatment of this subject. But too many flashbacks mar the smooth flow of the narrative". Andhra Today wrote "Though the story is loose and defective, the excellent treatment given by director makes it very appealing to the audience. The various turns and twists the story takes are not quite powerful and the way Krishnababu gets convicted for the first two crimes is not convincing as well as Vijay's decision to sacrifice his love for such a trivial reason. Kota Srinivasa Rao's role, which makes a few appearances, is totally redundant. All said and done, Muthyala Subbaiah, known for exploiting sentiment, did a thorough job of it and succeeded in impressing the audience".

The film was later dubbed and released in Tamil as Veera Vamsam.
