= James Hill (American film producer) =

American film producer (1916–2001)

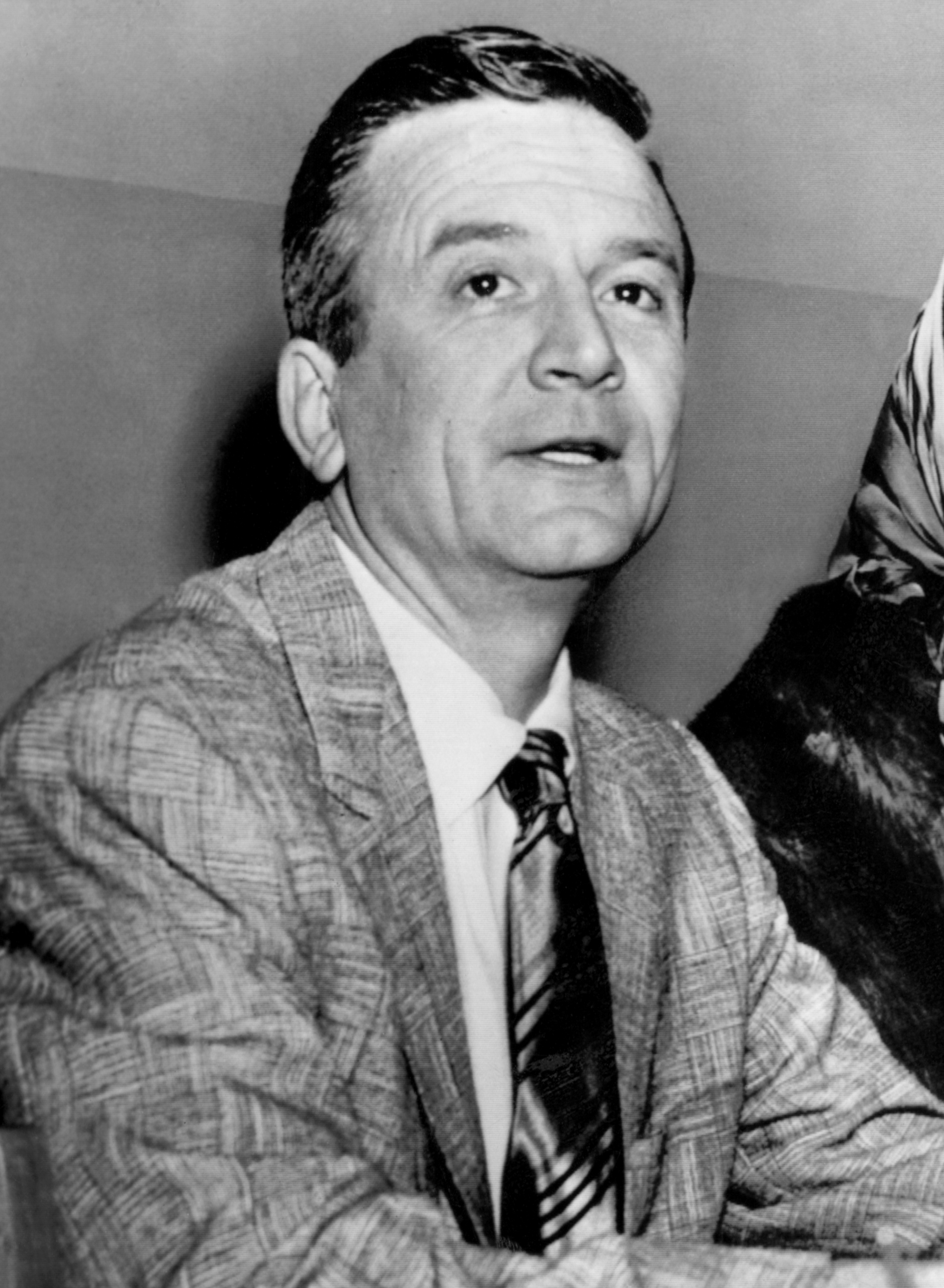
- Born: August 1, 1916; Indianapolis, Indiana, U.S.
- Died: January 11, 2001 (aged 84); Santa Monica, California, U.S.
- Occupations: Film producer; screenwriter
- Spouse: Rita Hayworth (m. 1958; div. 1961)

James Hill (August 1, 1916 – January 11, 2001) was an American film producer and screenwriter active from the late 1940s to the mid-1960s. He was born in Indianapolis, Indiana and came to Hollywood as a writer, working on films and televisions shows for Warner Brothers Pictures and Columbia Broadcasting System. He was eventually teamed with film producer Harold Hecht and actor Burt Lancaster when the pair produced His Majesty O'Keefe for their own film production company, Norma Productions. The movie was filmed in 1952 in the Fiji Islands, but only released in 1954.

In 1953, Hecht and Lancaster formed the imprint Hecht-Lancaster Productions and began producing films for United Artists, hiring Hill as producer for Vera Cruz, The Kentuckian and Trapeze. In early 1956, before Trapeze was released, Lancaster and Hecht announced in a press conference that Hill had been made an equal partner in their film production company; Hecht-Lancaster Productions would be changing name to Hecht-Hill-Lancaster Productions at the start of the next fiscal year in January 1957. From 1954 to 1959, the Norma Productions subsidiaries Hecht-Lancaster Productions and later Hecht-Hill-Lancaster Productions, were the biggest and most important independent production units in Hollywood.

Hill was the fifth and final husband of actress Rita Hayworth, married from 1958 to 1961. The pair met when Hayworth was filming Hecht-Hill-Lancaster Productions' Separate Tables. Like Hayworth, he developed Alzheimer's disease. He died in Santa Monica, California in 2001.

== Filmography ==
Year	Film	Production company	Distribution company	Role	Awards
1954	His Majesty O'Keefe	Norma Productions	Warner Brothers Pictures	Screenwriter	
1954	Vera Cruz	Hecht-Lancaster Productions / Flora Productions	United Artists	Producer	
1955	The Kentuckian	Hecht-Lancaster Productions / James Productions	United Artists	Producer	Nominated—Venice Film Festival Golden Lion
1956	Trapeze	Hecht-Lancaster Productions / Joanna Productions / Susan Productions	United Artists	Producer	Bambi Award for Best Actress – International; Berlin International Film Festival Silver Berlin Bear Award for Best Actor; Berlin International Film Festival Bronze Berlin Bear Award for Audience Poll; Nominated—Directors Guild of America Award for Outstanding Directorial Achievement in Motion Pictures
1957	The Bachelor Party	Hecht-Hill-Lancaster Productions / Norma Productions	United Artists	Executive producer	National Board of Review Award for Top Ten Films; Nominated—Academy Award for Best Actress in a Supporting Role; Nominated—BAFTA Award for Best Film from any Source; Nominated—Cannes Film Festival Palme d'Or
1957	Sweet Smell of Success	Hecht-Hill-Lancaster Productions / Norma Productions / Curtleigh Productions	United Artists	Executive producer	Bambi Award for Best Actor – International; National Film Preservation Board National Film Registry; Online Film & Television Association Award – Film Hall of Fame; Nominated—BAFTA Award for Best Foreign Actor; Nominated—Golden Laurel Award for Top Male Dramatic Performance; Nominated—Golden Laurel Award for Top Female Supporting Performance
1958	Run Silent, Run Deep	Hecht-Hill-Lancaster Productions / Jeffrey Productions	United Artists	Executive producer	Nominated—Golden Laurel Award for Top Cinematography – Black and White
1958	Separate Tables	Hecht-Hill-Lancaster Productions / Clifton Productions	United Artists	Executive producer	Academy Award for Best Actor in a Leading Role; Academy Award for Best Actress in a Supporting Role; Golden Globe Award for Best Actor – Motion Picture Drama; David di Donatello Award for Best Foreign Actress; Golden Laurel Award for Top Male Dramatic Performance; National Board of Review Award for Top Ten Films; New York Film Critics Circle Award for Best Actor; Sant Jordi Award for Best Foreign Actor; Nominated—Academy Award for Best Picture; Nominated—Academy Award for Best Actress in a Leading Role; Nominated—Academy Award for Best Writing, Screenplay Based on Material from Another Medium; Nominated—Academy Award for Best Cinematography, Black-and-White; Nominated—Academy Award for Best Music, Scoring of a Dramatic or Comedy Picture; Nominated—Golden Globe Award for Best Motion Picture – Drama; Nominated—Golden Globe Award for Best Actress – Motion Picture Drama; Nominated—Golden Globe Award for Best Supporting Actress; Nominated—Golden Globe Award for Best Director; Nominated—Golden Laurel Award for Top Female Dramatic Performance; Nominated—Golden Laurel Award for Top Female Supporting Performance; Nominated—New York Film Critics Circle Award for Best Film; Nominated—New York Film Critics Circle Award for Best Screenplay; Nominated—Writers Guild of America Award for Best Written American Drama
1959	The Rabbit Trap	Hecht-Hill-Lancaster Productions / Canon Productions / Anne Productions	United Artists	Executive producer	Locarno International Film Festival Award for Best Actor
1959	Cry Tough	Hecht-Hill-Lancaster Productions / Canon Productions / Anne Productions	United Artists	Executive producer	
1959	The Devil's Disciple	Hecht-Hill-Lancaster Films / Brynaprod	United Artists	Executive producer	Nominated—BAFTA Award for Best British Actor
1959	Summer of the Seventeenth Doll	Hecht-Hill-Lancaster Proprietary Limited	United Artists	Executive producer	
1959	Take a Giant Step	Hecht-Hill-Lancaster Productions / Sheila Productions	United Artists	Executive producer	Locarno International Film Festival Silver Sail Award; Nominated—Golden Globe Award for Best Supporting Actress; Nominated—Golden Globe Award for Best Film Promoting International Understanding; Nominated—BAFTA United Nations Award
1959	Thunder in the Sun	Carrollton Productions	Paramount Pictures	Story writer	
1960	The Unforgiven	Hecht-Hill-Lancaster Productions / James Productions	United Artists	Executive producer	
1961	The Happy Thieves	Hillworth Productions	United Artists	Executive producer	
