= Trang =

Trang may refer to:

== Places ==
- Trang province, Thailand
  - Trang, Thailand, capital city of Trang province
  - Trang Airport
  - Trang railway station
  - Trang River
- Trang, a sub-district of Mayo district, Pattani province, Thailand
- Trang (commune), Battambang province, Cambodia
- Trang, Lum Choar, Ratanakiri province, Cambodia

== People ==
- Trang (surname), a Vietnamese surname
- Trang F.C., a Thai semi-professional football club

== See also ==
- Taranga (disambiguation)
- Tarang (disambiguation)
