= Tarang (Yap) =

Island in Yap, Micronesia

- Location within Oceania

Geography
- Location: Yap, Federated States of Micronesia
- Coordinates: 9°31′38″N 138°7′54″E
- Highest elevation: 22 ft (6.7 m)

Administration
- Federated States of Micronesia
- State: Yap

Tarang, also known as O'Keefe's Island, is a small island in the main harbor of Yap, Federated States of Micronesia. It is located roughly in the center of the harbor east of Colonia, the Yapese capital, between Pekel and Bi Islands. It was the home of Captain David O'Keefe, for which it was made one of the U.S. National Register of Historic Places sites in the former Trust Territory of the Pacific Islands.

== Geography and ecology ==
Tarang is a low island with a maximum height of about 22 feet (6.7 m), and is overgrown with tropical vegetation. In 1950, Harvey I. Fisher reported that the brown noddy, although he could not find them on the main island of Yap or any of the other minor islands in the area, was present on Tarang, and estimated their population there to number at 250. They were usually seen in the tops of chestnut, breadfruit and pandanus trees, the lattermost of which was seen to have nests in them at heights of 12–18 ft (3.7–5.5 m).

== History ==
The island was the home of Captain David O'Keefe, an enterprising American who arrived on Yap in the 1870s, and was responsible for not only significant economic growth, but also for the depreciation of the distinctive Yapese currency, the large rai stones which became devalued after O'Keefe introduced iron tools that made manufacture of the stones easier. O'Keefe settled on Tarang with his wife Charlotte, where he had a boat landing, coal warehouse, and house. Charlotte was reported to still be living at the old trading station on the island as late as 1923; their daughter had by then moved to another island. Of the structures built by O'Keefe, only the boat landing has survived intact; only the foundations of the others remain. The island was listed on the United States National Register of Historic Places in 1976, a time when Yap was part of the US-administered Trust Territory of the Pacific Islands.
