= Koti (composer) =

Indian composer, record producer, singer (born 1958)

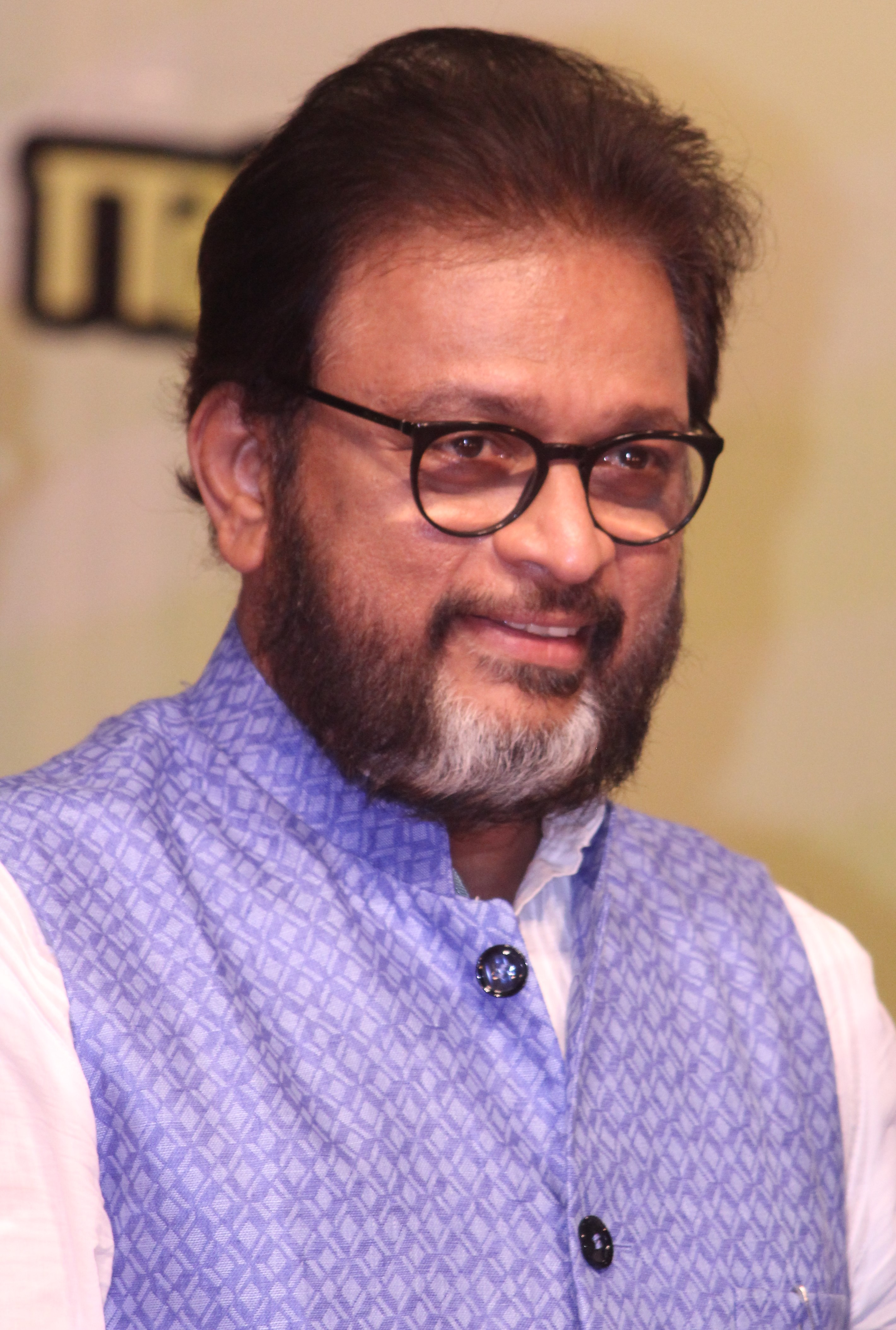
- Koti at Saluri Rajeswara Rao's 100th birth anniversary celebrations in Ravindra Bharathi on 17 October 2021
- Born: Saluri Koteswara Rao; 28 May 1958; Mylapore, Chennai, India
- Spouse(s): S.Jyothi (m.1985), Chennai
- Children: 3
- Father: S. Rajeswara Rao
- Musical career
- Genres: Film score; film music; electronic music; world music
- Occupations: Composer; record producer; singer
- Years active: 1983-present

Signature
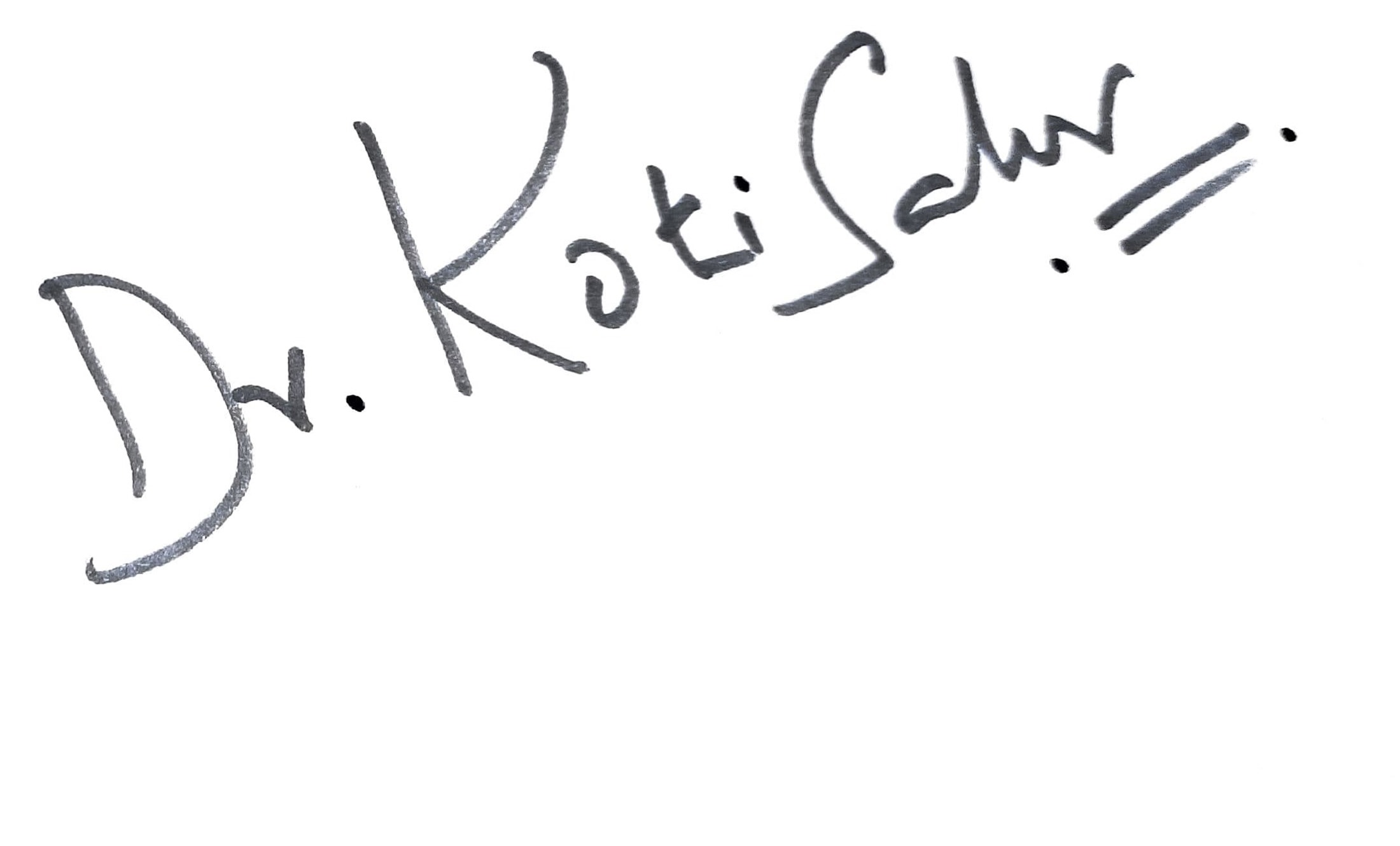

Saluri Koteswara Rao, known professionally as Koti, is an Indian composer and singer who predominantly works in Telugu films . He has composed music for over 550 films. The son of veteran composer S. Rajeswara Rao, in early 1980s Koti teamed up with Somaraju (Raj), son of T. V. Raju, and the resulting duo was known as Raj–Koti. The duo composed music for about 180 films from their debut in 1983 till their separation in 1994. After the separation, Koti has composed music and background score for more than 350 movies. He won the Nandi Award for Best Music Director for the film Hello Brother (1994).

== Career ==
He started his music career as an assistant to music director K. Chakravarthy. Renowned composers from South India such as A. R. Rahman, Mani Sharma, Harris Jayaraj and S. Thaman, worked as keyboard programmers with Koti during the initial part of their career. Roshan Saluri, son of Koti is also introduced as film score composer and is married to Tejaswini and their daughter is Swasthika Roshan saluri . Another son Rajeev Saluri started his career as an actor. Daughter Bhagyasri Saluri is married to Srinivas Nallapati and is blessed with daughters (Aanya & Diya)

== Discography ==
Telugu

Chikpak Chikbam(Private Album) (1991)

- Amma Donga (1995)
- Alluda Majaka (1995)
- Love Game (1995)
- Bhale Bullodu (1995)
- Rikshavodu (1995)
- Sankalpam (1995)
- Aayanaki Iddaru (1995)
- Telugu Veera Levara (1995)
- Ketu Duplicatu (1995)
- Peddarayudu (1995)
- Subhamasthu (1995)
- Pellaala Rajyam (1996)
- Vamsanikokkadu (1996)
- Sarada Bullodu (1996)
- Akkada Ammayi Ikkada Abbayi (1996)
- Hello Mogudu Bhale Pellam (1996)
- Hello Neeku Naaku Pellanta (1996)
- Akka Bagunnava (1996)
- Nayudu Gaari Kutumbam (1996)
- Soggadi Pellam (1996)
- Intlo Illalu Vantintlo Priyuralu (1997)
- Peddannayya (1997)
- Muddula Mogudu (1997)
- Hitler (1997)
- Subhakankshalu (1997)
- Chelikaadu (1997)
- Chilakkottudu (1997)
- Collector Gaaru (1997)
- Abbaygari Pelli (1997)
- Bobbili Dora (1997)
- Korukunna Priyudu (1997)
- Gokulamlo Seetha (1997)
- Maa Nannaki Pelli (1997)
- Pelli Chesukundam (1997)
- Priya O Priya (1997)
- Priyamaina Srivaru (1997)
- Jai Bajarangbali (1997)
- Jagadeka Veerudu (1997)
- Taraka Ramudu (1997)
- Khaidi Garu (1998)
- Yuvaratna Raana (1998)
- Prema Pallaki (1998)
- Mee Aayana Jagratha (1998)
- Shrivaarante Maavare (1998)
- Kanyadanam (1998)
- Gillikajjalu (1998)
- Maavidaakulu (1998)
- Pavitra Prema (1998)
- Snehitulu (1998)
- Shrimati Vellosta (1998)
- Pape Naa Pranam (1998)
- Subhavartha (1998)
- Subhalekhalu (1998)
- Ramasakkanodu (1999)
- Chinni Chinnni Aasa (1999)
- Sultan (1999)
- Pilla Nachindi (1999)
- Krishna Babu (1999)
- Vamsoddharakudu (2000)
- Oke Maata (2000)
- Okkadu Chalu (2000)
- Chala Bagundi (2000)
- Goppinti Alludu (2000)
- Nuvve Kavali (2000)
- Veedekkadi Mogudandi? (2001)
- Prema Sandadi (2001)
- Naalo Unna Prema (2001)
- Darling Darling (2001)
- Nuvvu Naaku Nachav (2001)
- Repallelo Radha (2001)
- Adhipathi (2001)
- June July (2002) (film unreleased)
- Manamiddaram (2002)
- Vooru Manadiraa (2002)
- Kondaveeti Simhasanam (2002)
- Neetho Cheppalani (2002)
- Sandade Sandadi (2002)
- Nuvve Nuvve (2002)
- Hai (2002)
- Vijayam (2003)
- Ela Cheppanu (2003)
- Maa Bapu Bommaku Pellanta (2003)
- Swetha Naagu (2004)
- Naalo Unna Prema (2004)
- Vijayendra Varma (2004)
- Gowri (2004)
- Anandamanandamaye (2004)
- Malliswari (2004)
- Preminchukunnam Pelliki Randi (2004)
- Dost (2004)
- Mr. Errababu (2005)
- Nayakudu (2005)
- Nuvvante Naakishtam (2005)
- Ganga (2006)
- Premante Inte (2006)
- Notebook (2006)
- Gopi – Goda Meedha Pilli (2006)
- Classmates (2007)
- Mee Sreyobhilashi (2007)
- Podarillu (2007)
- Aalayam (2008)
- Blade Babji (2008)
- Ek Police (2008)
- Kousalya Supraja Rama (2008)
- Manorama (2009)
- Nachchav Alludu (2009)
- Arundhati (2009)
- Aa Intlo (2009)
- Target (2009)
- Neramu Siksha (2009)
- Bendu Apparao R.M.P (2009)
- Aalasyam Amrutam (2010)
- Brahmi Gadi Katha (2011)
- Anaganaga O Dheerudu (2010) (2 Songs)
- Raaj (2011)
- Katha Screenplay Darshakatvam Appalaraju (2011)
- Kshetram (2011)
- Mugguru (2011)
- Aha Naa Pellanta! (2011) (Background score)
- Onamalu (2012)
- Hitudu (2015)
- Mama Manchu Alludu Kanchu (2015)
- 1997 (2022)
- Anthima Theerpu (2024)

Kannada films

- Gadibidi Aliya (1995)
- Jeevanadhi (1996)
- Maduve Aagona Baa (2001)
- Bahala Chennagide (2002)
- Rowdy Aliya (2004)
- Avale Nanna Gelathi (2004)

Hindi films

- Trimurti (1995) - (Background score)
- Jeet (1995) - (Background score)
- Judwaa (1997) (Background Score)
- Sooryavansham (1999) (Background score)
- Hogi Pyaar Ki Jeet (1999) (Background score)

== Actor ==
- Sehari (2022)
- Paga Paga Paga (2022)
