= Pelli Chesukundam =

- Theatrical release poster
- Directed by: Muthyala Subbaiah
- Written by: Posani Krishna Murali (dialogues)
- Story by: Bhupathi Raja
- Produced by: C. Venkat Raju; G. Siva Raju
- Starring: Venkatesh; Soundarya; Laila
- Cinematography: K. Ravindra Babu
- Edited by: Gautham Raju
- Music by: Koti
- Production company: Geeta Chitra International
- Release date: 9 October 1997
- Running time: 141 minutes
- Country: India
- Language: Telugu

Pelli Chesukundam (transl. Let us marry) is a 1997 Indian Telugu-language film directed by Muthyala Subbaiah, produced by C. Venkat Raju and G. Siva Raju under Geeta Chitra International. It stars Venkatesh, Soundarya and Laila, with music composed by Koti.

== Plot ==
Pelli Chesukundham is a story of how Anand, a multi-millionaire, supports Santhi, survivor of a rape. Santhi witnesses a murder committed by Kali Charan and reports it in the police station. His brother rapes her to take revenge and her family doesn't want her to stay with them. Anand, knowing everything, welcomes her and gives her shelter in his house, though society disapproves of it.

Anand slowly falls in love with Santhi, but Santhi thinks highly of him and doesn't want to get close with him. Meanwhile, Anand's cousin Laila returns from the US and pursues Anand. She slowly realises that Anand was in love with Santhi and leaves him. Anand and Santhi at last reconcile and marry.

== Cast ==
- Venkatesh as Anand
- Soundarya as Santhi
- Laila as Laila
- Mohan Raj as Kaali Charan
- Devan as Krishna Prasad
- Satya Prakash
- Brahmanandam as Brahmam
- Sudhakar as Subba Rao
- Tanikella Bharani
- Venu Madhav
- Narra Venkateswara Rao as S.P.
- Posani Krishna Murali as S.I. Ramesh
- Subhalekha Sudhakar as Siva
- Subbaraya Sharma
- Suthi Velu as Shanti's father
- Kallu Chidambaram
- Kishore Rathi
- Chandra Mouli
- Gadiraju Subba Rao
- Echuri
- Annapurna as Shanti's mother
- Sumitra as Anand's mother
- Rajitha
- Ragini
- Aswini (Rudra) as Radhika
- Annuja
- Radha Prashanthi
- Lata
- Sabita
- Nallini
- Master Mahendra
- Baby Soumya
- Niranjan Varma

== Soundtrack ==
Pelli Chesukundam

Film score by Koti
- Released: 1997
- Genre: Soundtrack
- Length: 28:25
- Label: Supreme Music
- Producer: Koti

Koti chronology
Priya O Priya (1997)	Pelli Chesukundam (1997)	Evandi Pelli Chesukondi (1997)

The music was composed by Koti and released by SUPREME Music Company.

No.	Title	Lyrics	Singer(s)	Length
1.	"O Laila Laila"	Bhuvanachandra	S. P. Balu, Swarnalatha	4:37
2.	"Kokila Kokila"	Sai Sri Harsha	S. P. Balu, K.S. Chithra	5:03
3.	"Nuvvemi Chesavu"	Sirivennela Sitaramasastri	K. J. Yesudas	4:48
4.	"Enno Enno"	Sirivennela Sitaramastri	S. P. Balu, K.S. Chithra	4:20
5.	"Manasuna Manasai"	Chandrabose	S. P. Balu, K.S. Chithra	5:15
6.	"Ghuma Ghumalade"	Chandrabose	S. P. Balu, K.S. Chithra	4:16
Total length:				28:25

== Remakes ==
Year	Film	Language	Cast	Notes
1998	En Uyir Nee Thaane	Tamil	Prabhu, Devayani, Maheswari	
2001	Maduve Aagona Baa	Kannada	Shiva Rajkumar, Laya, Shilpi	

== Reception ==
A critic from Andhra Today said that the film "has a message to convey to the audience and at the same time it has all the ingredients to make it a box-office hit. It drives home some truths and solutions on the social stigma attached to rape victims and the double standards of people".
