= Sultan (1999 film) =

1999 Indian film by Sarath

- Audio Cover
- Directed by: Sarath
- Screenplay by: Paruchuri Brothers
- Story by: M. R. V. Prasad
- Produced by: M. R. V. Prasad; Nandamuri Balakrishna (Presents)
- Starring: Nandamuri Balakrishna; Krishna; Krishnam Raju; Roja; Rachana; Deepti Bhatnagar
- Cinematography: K. Ravindra Babu
- Edited by: Kotagiri Venkateswara Rao
- Music by: Koti
- Production company: P. B. R. Art Productions
- Release date: 27 May 1999
- Running time: 143 minutes
- Country: India
- Language: Telugu

Sultan is a 1999 Indian Telugu-language action drama film directed by Sarath. The film stars an ensemble cast of Nandamuri Balakrishna, Krishna, Krishnam Raju, Roja, Rachana, and Deepti Bhatnagar, with music composed by Koti. The film was released on 27 May 1999. It was remade in Hindi with the same name.

== Cast ==
- Nandamuri Balakrishna as Sultan and Prudhvi (dual role)
- Krishna as Ashok
- Krishnam Raju as Mustafa
- Roja as Revati
- Rachana as Renuka
- Deepti Bhatnagar as Vandana
- Bramhanandam as Anji
- Narra Venkateswara Rao as M. P. Mutyala Rao
- Gokina Rama Rao as Minister Venkataratnam
- Siva Krishna as Sultan's father
- Mannava Balayya as Major Chakradhara Rao (Pruthvi's father)
- Raghunatha Reddy as Minister
- Ravi Babu as Noor
- Jeeva as Police Inspector
- Satya Prakash as Terrorist
- Jack Gaud as Terrorist
- Annapurna as Renuka's mother
- Sudha as Saraswathi (Pruthvi's mother)
- Siva Parvathi as Sultan's mother
- Bangalore Padma as Venkataratnam's wife

== Soundtrack ==
Music composed by Koti. Music released on Supreme Music Company.

No.	Title	Lyrics	Singer(s)	Length
1.	"O Kaliki Rama Chilaka"	Veturi	Udit Narayan, Chitra	4:29
2.	"Nandi Konda Meeda"	Veturi	Sukhwinder Singh, Sujatha	5:02
3.	"Aakasam Gundello"	Jaladi	S. P. Balasubrahmanyam, Mano	4:16
4.	"Panchadara Chettumeda"	Veturi	Udit Narayan, Chitra	4:52
5.	"Chima Chima"	Bhuvanachandra	Mano, Chitra	4:04
6.	"Shabba Shabba"	Chandrabose	Sukhwinder Singh, Malgudi Subha	4:44
Total length:				27:27
