= Tarangini (music) =

Raga Tarangini, Tarangini, is a raga in the Carnatic tradition.

The most well-known musical composition of Narayana Teertha, the 17th century Carnatic music composer, is a Sanskrit opera called the Sri Krishna Leela Tarangini. It is believed Lord Krishna danced to the Tharangams. It is an opera suitable for dramatic dance and it has been adapted by Kuchipudi dancers over the last two centuries.

== Compositions ==
The Sri Krishna Leela Tarangini consists of 12 Tarangams and encapsulates 153 songs, 302 slokams and 31 choornikaas. Teertha followed Veda Vyasa’s Bhagavatam and concentrated on the 10th Skandam.
