= List of Telugu films of 1988 =

This is a list of notable films produced by the Tollywood (Telugu language film industry) based in Hyderabad in the year 1988.

== 1988 ==
Title	Director	Cast	Music	Notes
Aahuthi	Kodi Ramakrishna	Rajasekhar, Jeevitha	Satyam	
Aakhari Poratam	K. Raghavendra Rao	Nagarjuna, Sridevi, Suhasini, Satyanarayana Kaikala	Ilaiyaraaja	
Abhinandana	Ashok Kumar	Karthik, Shobana	Ilaiyaraaja	
Agni Keratalu	T. Rama Rao	Krishna, Bhanupriya, Gummadi	Chakravarthy	
Antima Teerpu	Joshiy	Krishnam Raju, Thiagarajan, Sumalatha	Shyam	
Asthulu Anthasthulu	Bairisetty Bhaskara Rao	Rajendra Prasad, Chandra Mohan, Ramya Krishna	Ilaiyaraaja	
Aswaddhama	B. Gopal	Krishna, Vijayashanti, Nutan Prasad	Chakravarthy	
August 15 Raatri	P. N. Ramachandra Rao	Arjun, Sarath Babu, Gautami	Satyam	
Bava Marudula Saval	C. V. Ganesh	Rajendra Prasad, Rajasekhar, Ramya Krishna	Shivaji Raja	
Bazaar Rowdy	A. Kodandarami Reddy	Ramesh Babu, Gautami, Nadhiya, Mahesh Babu	Raj–Koti	
Bhama Kalapam	Relangi Narasimha Rao	Rajendra Prasad, Rajani, Ramya Krishna	Vasu Rao	
Bharatamlo Bala Chandrudu	Kodi Ramakrishna	Nandamuri Balakrishna, Bhanupriya	Chakravarthy	
Bharya Bhartala Bhagotham	Mahesh Kumar	Rajendra Prasad, Chandra Mohan, Ashwini	Krishna-Chakra	
Brahma Puthrudu	Dasari Narayana Rao	Daggubati Venkatesh, Rajani, Roja, Sharada, Jayasudha	Chakravarthy	
Chikkadu Dorakadu	Relangi Narasimha Rao	Rajendra Prasad, Rajani	Chakravarthy	
Chinababu	Mohan Gandhi	Nagarjuna, Mohan Babu, Amala, Jaggayya	Ilaiyaraaja	
Chinnodu Peddodu	Relangi Narasimha Rao	Rajendra Prasad, Chandra Mohan, Khushbu	S. P. Balasubrahmanyam	
Choopulu Kalasina Subhavela	Jandhyala	Mohan, Naresh, Ashwini	Rajan–Nagendra	
Chuttalabbayi	Kodi Ramakrishna	Krishna, Radha, Suhasini Maniratnam	Chakravarthy	
Daasi	B. Narsing Rao	Archana, Bhoopal Reddy		
Donga Kollu	Vijaya Bapineedu	Rajendra Prasad, Sumalatha, Nutan Prasad	Vasu Rao	
Dharma Teja	Perala	Krishnam Raju, Radhika, Sharada	Vidyasagar	
Donga Pelli	Ravi Raja Pinisetty	Sobhan Babu, Vijayashanti, Sumalatha	Chakravarthy	
Donga Ramudu	K. Raghavendra Rao	Nandamuri Balakrishna	Tulasi	
Illu Illalu Pillalu	Visu	Chandra Mohan, Sharada, Anand Babu	Vijayanand	
Inspector Pratap	Muthyala Subbaiah	Nandamuri Balakrishna, Vijayashanti	Chakravarthy	
Jamadagni	Bharathiraja	Ghattamaneni Krishna, Radha, Kaikala Satyanarayana	Raj–Koti	
Janaki Ramudu	K. Raghavendra Rao	Nagarjuna, Vijayashanti, Jeevitha	K. V. Mahadevan	
Jeevana Ganga	Mouli	Rajendra Prasad, Rajani	Chakravarthy	
Jeevana Jyothi	Relangi Narasimha Rao	Sarath Babu, Rajendra Prasad, Jayasudha, Khushbu	Raj–Koti	
Jhansi Rani	Satyanand	Rajendra Prasad, Bhanupriya	Chakravarthy	
Kallu	M. V. Raghu	Sivaji Raja	S.P. Balasubrahmanyam	
Khaidi No. 786	Vijaya Bapineedu	Chiranjeevi, Bhanupriya, Mohan Babu, Nutan Prasad, Kota Srinivasa Rao	Raj–Koti	
Maa Inti Maharaju	Vijaya Bapineedu	Krishnam Raju, Jayasudha, Rajesh, Nirmalamma	Vasu Rao	
Maharshi	Vamsy	Maharshi Raghava, Shantipriya	Ilaiyaraaja	
Manchi Donga	K. Raghavendra Rao	Chiranjeevi, Suhasini, Vijayashanti	Chakravarthy	
Marana Mrudangam	A. Kodandarami Reddy	Chiranjeevi, Suhasini, Radha, Mohan Babu	Ilaiyaraaja	
Mugguru Kodukulu	Krishna	Krishna, Radha, Sonam	Chakravarthy	
Murali Krishnudu	Kodi Ramakrishna	Nagarjuna, Rajani, Mohan Babu	K.V. Mahendran	
Pelli Chesi Choodu	Relangi Narasimha Rao	Rajendra Prasad, Ashwini, Tara, Ali	Vasu Rao	
Prana Snehithulu	V. Madhusudana Rao	Krishnam Raju, Sarath Babu, Radha	Raj–Koti	
Raktabhishekam	A. Kodandarami Reddy	Balakrishna, Radha	Ilaiyaraaja	
Raktha Tilakam	B. Gopal	Daggubati Venkatesh, Amala	Chakravarthy	
Ramudu Bheemudu	K. Murali Mohana Rao	Balakrishna, Radha, Suhasini	Raj–Koti	
Rao Gari Illu	Tharani Rao	Akkineni Nageswara Rao, Jayasudha, Revathy	Chakravarthy	
Rowdy No.1	S. S. Ravichandran	Krishna, Radha, Sharada	Raj–Koti	
Rudraveena	K. Balachandar	Chiranjeevi, Shobana, Gemini Ganesan, Brahmanandam	Ilaiyaraaja	
Sahasam Cheyara Dimbhaka	Relangi Narasimha Rao	Rajendra Prasad, Kalpana, Brahmanandam, Kota Srinivasa Rao	Chakravarthy	
Samsaram	Relangi Narasimha Rao	Sobhan Babu, Jaya Prada, Rajendra Prasad	Raj–Koti|	
Sri Kanaka Mahalakshmi Recording Dance Troupe	Vamsy	Naresh, Madhuri, Tanikella Bharani, Kota Srinivasa Rao	Ilaiyaraaja	
Station Master	Kodi Ramakrishna	Rajendra Prasad, Rajasekhar, Jeevitha, Ashwini, Chandra Mohan	Chakravarthy	
Swarnakamalam	K. Vishwanath	Daggubati Venkatesh, Bhanupriya	Ilaiyaraaja	
Thodallullu	Relangi Narasimha Rao	Rajendra Prasad, Chandra Mohan, Gautami	Raj–Koti	
Tiragabadda Telugubidda	A. Kodandarami Reddy	Nandamuri Balakrishna, Bhanupriya	Chakravarthy	
Trinetrudu	A. Kodandarami Reddy	Chiranjeevi, Bhanupriya, Brahmanandam	Raj–Koti	
Varasudochadu	Mohan Gandhi	Daggubati Venkatesh, Suhasini, Annapoorna, Kota Srinivasa Rao	Ilaiyaraaja	
Vivaha Bhojanambu	Jandhyala	Rajendra Prasad, Ashwini, Brahmanandam	Raj–Koti	
Yamudiki Mogudu	Ravi Raja Pinisetty	Chiranjeevi, Deepika, Radha, Vijayashanti, Kota Srinivasa Rao	Raj–Koti	
Yuddha Bhoomi	K. Raghavendra Rao	Chiranjeevi, Vijayashanti	Chakravarthy	
