= List of Telugu films of 1989 =

This is a list of films produced by the Tollywood (Telugu language film industry) based in Hyderabad in the year 1989.

== Released films ==
Title	Director	Cast	Music	Notes
Agni	K. Raghavendra Rao	Nagarjuna, Shantipriya	Hamsalekha	
Ajatha Satruvu	Vijaya Nirmala	Krishna, Radha	Shankar-Ganesh	
Anna Chellalu	Ravi Raja Pinisetty	Shoban Babu, Radhika, Sharath Babu, Jeevitha	Chakravarthy	
Ashoka Chakravarthy	S. S. Ravichandra	Balakrishna, Anjali Devi, Bhanupriya, Suvarna	Ilaiyaraaja	
Attaku Yamudu Ammayiki Mogudu	A. Kodandarami Reddy	Chiranjeevi, Vanisri, Vijayashanti	Chakravarthy	
Adavilo Abhimanyudu	Anil	Jagapathi Babu, Aishwarya, Gummadi	K. V. Mahadevan	
Bala Gopaludu	Kodi Ramakrishna	Balakrishna, Suhasini, Rekha, Mohan Babu	Raj–Koti	
Bandhuvulostunnaru Jagratha	Sharath	Rajendra Prasad, Rajani, Subhalekha	Chakravarthy	
Bava Bava Panneeru	Jandhyala	Naresh, Kota Srinivasa Rao, Rupakala, Brahmanandam	Chakravarthy	
Bhale Dampathulu	Kodi Ramakrishna	ANR, Rajendra Prasad, Jayasudha	K. V. Mahadevan	
Bhale Donga	A. Kodandarami Reddy	Balakrishna, Mohan Babu, Vijayashanti, Jaggayya	Chakravarthy	
Bharata Nari	Muthyala Subbaiah	Vinod Kumar Alva, Vijayashanti	Chakravarthy	
Bharyalu Jagratha	K. Balachandar	Rahman, Geetha, Sithara, Janakaraj	Ilaiyaraaja	Dubbed from Tamil film
Chalaki Mogudu Chadastapu Pellam	Relangi Narasimha Rao	Rajendra Prasad, Rajani	J. V. Raghavulu	
Chettu Kinda Pleader	Vamshi	Rajendra Prasad, Urvashi, Kinnera	Ilaiyaraaja	
Dhruva Nakshatram	Y. Nageswara Rao	Daggubati Venkatesh, Rajani	Chakravarthy,	
Gaduggai	Sharath	Rajendra Prasad, Rajani	Chakravarthy	
Geetanjali	Mani Ratnam	Nagarjuna, Girija, Vijayakumar	Ilaiyaraaja	
Goonda Rajyam	Kodi Ramakrishna	Krishna, Vijayashanti, Sharada	Raj-Koti	
Gopala Rao Gari Abbayi	Manivannan	Rajendra Prasad, Karthik, Ramya Krishna	Raj-Koti	
Gudachari 117	Kodi Ramakrishna	Krishna, Shubha	Chakravarthy	
Hai Hai Nayaka	Jandhyala	Naresh, Sri Bharathi, Suryakantham	Suresh Chandra	
Indrudu Chandrudu	Suresh Krishna	Kamal Haasan, Vijayashanti, Charanraj	Ilaiyaraaja	
Jayammu Nischayammu Raa	Jandhyala	Rajendra Prasad, Sumalatha, Chandra Mohan	Raj-Koti	
Joo Laka Taka	G. Madhusudhan Rao	Rajendra Prasad, Thulasi, Brahmanandam, Chandra Mohan	Raj–Koti	
Koduku Diddina Kapuram	Krishna	Krishna, Vijayashanti, Mahesh Babu	Raj–Koti	
Kokila	Geetha Krishna	Naresh, Shobana, Sharath Babu, Geetha	Ilaiyaraaja	
Lankeswarudu	Dasari Narayana Rao	Chiranjeevi, Revathi, Radha, Mohan Babu	Raj–Koti	
Mamatala Kovela	Muthyala Subbaiah	Rajasekhar, Suhasini, Rami Reddy Shubhalekha Srinivas	K. V. Mahadevan	
Manchu Kutumbam		Krishna	Chakravarthy	
Mouna Poratam	Mohan Gandhi	Yamuna, Vinod Kumar Alva	S. Janaki	
Muddula Mavayya	Kodi Ramakrishna	Nandamuri Balakrishna, Vijayashanti	K. V. Mahadevan	
Muthyamantha Muddu	Raviraja Pinisetty	Rajendra Prasad, Seetha	Hamsalekha	
Ontari Poratam	K. Raghavendra Rao	Daggubati Venkatesh, Payal Malhotra, Rupini, Jayasudha	Chakravarthy	
Paila Pacheesu	T. S. B. K. Moulee	Rajendra Prasad, Ramya Krishnan	Nagendranath	
Poola Rangadu	Relangi Narasimha Rao	Rajendra Prasad, Ashwini, Vanisri	Raj-Koti	
Prema	Suresh Krissna	Daggubati Venkatesh, Revathi	Ilaiyaraaja	
Preminchi Choodu	Trivuraneni Varaprasad	Rajendra Prasad, Chandra Mohan, Silk Smitha	Raj-Koti	
Rajakeeya Chadarangam	P. Chandrasekhara Reddy	ANR, Krishna, Sujatha	Raj-Koti	
Rudranetra	K. Raghavendra Rao	Chiranjeevi, Vijayashanti, Radha, Brahmanandam	Ilaiyaraaja	
Sahasame Naa Oopiri	Vijaya Nirmala	Krishna, Vijaya Nirmala, Naresh	Vidyasagar	
Sakshi	P. N. Ramachandra Rao	Rajendra Prasad, Chandra Mohan, Lissy	Raj-Koti	
Samsaram Oka Sangeetham	Bharadhwaj	Chandra Mohan, Vijayashanti, Sharath Babu, Poornima, Nirmalamma	Chakravarthy	
Sarvabhoumudu	S. S. Ravichandra	Krishna, Radha	Chakravarthy	
Simha Swapnam	V. Madhusudhana Rao	Krishnam Raju, Jayasudha	Chakravarthy	
Siva	Ram Gopal Varma	Nagarjuna, Amala, Raghuvaran, J. D. Chakravarthy	Ilaiyaraaja	
Srirama Chandrudu	B. Bhaskara Rao	Krishnam Raju, Sujatha, Vijayashanti, Sharada	Satyam	
State Rowdy	B. Gopal	Chiranjeevi, Radha, Bhanupriya, Sharada	Bappi Lahiri	
Sutradharulu	K. Viswanath	ANR, Bhanuchander, Ramya Krishna	K. V. Mahadevan	
Swathi Chinukulu	Sri Chakramurthy	Vanisri, Ramya Krishna	Ilaiyaraaja	
Two Town Rowdy	Dasari Narayana Rao	Daggubati Venkatesh, Radha	Raj-Koti	
Vichitra Sodarulu	Singeetham Srinivasa Rao	Kamal Haasan, Rupini, Gautami	Ilaiyaraaja	
Vicky Daada	A. Kodandarami Reddy	Nagarjuna, Radha, Juhi Chawla	Raj-Koti	
Vijay	B. Gopal	Nagarjuna, Vijayashanti, Sharath Babu, Jayasudha	Chakravarthy	
Yamapaasam	Raviraja Pinisetty	Rajasekhar, Deepika, Shanti Priya	Chakravarthy	
