= Rao Gari Intlo Rowdy =

- Theatrical release poster
- Directed by: Kodi Ramakrishna
- Written by: T. Madhu (dialogues)
- Screenplay by: Kodi Ramakrishna
- Story by: Ram Prasad Arts Unit
- Produced by: N. Sai Prasanna
- Starring: Akkineni Nageswara Rao; Vanisri; Suman; Rajani
- Cinematography: Sarath
- Edited by: K. Nageswara Rao; Satyanarayana
- Music by: Raj–Koti
- Production company: Ram Prasad Arts
- Release date: 1990
- Running time: 120 mins
- Country: India
- Language: Telugu

Rao Gari Intlo Rowdy (transl. Rowdy in Rao's House) is a 1990 Telugu-language action-drama film, produced by N. Sai Prasanna under the Ram Prasad Arts banner and directed by Kodi Ramakrishna. It stars Akkineni Nageswara Rao, Vanisri, Suman, Rajani and music composed by Raj–Koti.

== Cast ==
- Akkineni Nageswara Rao as Anand Rao
- Vanisri as Vani
- Suman as Kotigadu
- Rajani as Gowri
- Prabhakar Reddy as I.G.
- Kota Srinivasa Rao as Bujjulu
- Raja Krishna Murthy as Alexander
- Sudarshan as Periyappa Devara
- Brahmanandam as Inspector Kukuteswara Rao / Ram Prasad
- Babu Mohan as Broker Babu Rao
- Mallikarjuna Rao as Munni Swamy
- Ananth
- Bhimeswara Rao as Judge
- Gadiraju Subba Rao
- Bhagyasri as Shanti
- Anitha
- Aruna as Saroja
- Baby Sowmya Hamsa as Baby

== Soundtrack ==
Rao Gari Intlo Rowdy

Film score by Raj–Koti
- Released: 1990
- Genre: Soundtrack
- Length: 17:20
- Label: Cauvery Audio
- Producer: Raj–Koti

Raj–Koti chronology
Kondaveeti Rowdy (1990)	Rao Gari Intlo Rowdy (1990)	Qaidi Dada (1990)

Music composed by Raj–Koti. Lyrics were written by Jonnavithhula Ramalingeswara Rao. Music released on Cauvery Audio Company.

S. No.	Song title	Singers	length
1	"Manasanedi Maya Bazaar"	S. P. Balasubrahmanyam	3:39
2	"Chitti Kanna"	S. P. Balasubrahmanyam, S. Janaki	3:17
3	"Yerretti Poye"	S. P. Balasubrahmanyam, S. Janaki	3:36
4	"Ardha Rathri Kodi"	S. P. Balasubrahmanyam, S. Janaki	3:33
5	"Manasanedi Maya Bazaar"	S. P. Balasubrahmanyam	3:15

== Other ==
- VCDs and DVDs on - SHALIMAR Video Company, Hyderabad
