= Agni Gundam =

- Theatrical poster
- Directed by: Kranthi Kumar
- Written by: Satyanand [dialogues]
- Produced by: Kranthi Kumar
- Starring: Chiranjeevi; Sumalatha; Silk Smitha
- Cinematography: A. Venkat
- Edited by: B. Krishnam Raju
- Music by: K. Chakravarthy
- Release date: 22 April 1984
- Country: India
- Language: Telugu

Agni Gundam is a 1984 Telugu film directed by Kranthi Kumar. The film stars Chiranjeevi, Sumalatha and Silk Smitha in prominent roles.

== Plot ==
Vijay, a factory worker, exposes the wrongdoings of Satyam. In retaliation, Satyam arranges for Vijay's brother, Chinna, to marry Latha, Vijay's lover. Later, Chinna is killed, and Vijay is arrested for the crime.

== Cast ==
- Chiranjeevi
- Sumalatha
- Raogopal Rao
- Sujatha
- Sarath Babu
- Nutan Prasad
- Silk Smitha
- Athili Lakshmi
- Suthi Veerabhadra Rao
- Suthi Velu
- Rallapalli
- Uday Kumar
- Rajiv
- Rajasekhar Reddy
- Raju
- B. Isaac Prabhakar
- Telephone Satyanarayana
- Madan Mohan

== Crew ==
- Dialogues: Satyanand
- Lyrics: Veturi
- Playback Singers: S. P. Balasubrahmanyam, P. Susheela & S. P. Sailaja
- Stunts: Raju
- Art Director: Bhaskar Raju
- Dances: Saleem
- Operative Cameraman: K. V. Ramana
- Associate Director: Nagandla
- Chief Associate Director: Vankineni Ratna Pratap
- Co-director: Jayakumar Kanagala
- Editor: B. Krishnam Raju
- Cinematographer: A. Venkat
- Music: K. Chakravarthy
- Producer: Kranthi Kumar

== Production Companies ==
- Production Company: Sri Kranthi Chitra
- Studios: Prasad Studios, Vauhini Studios, AVM Studios, Arunachalam Studios & Karpagam Studios
- Outdoor Unit: Sarada Enterprises, Sri Bhramarambika Outdoor Unit
- Processing & Printing: Prasad Color Laboratories
- Poster Printing: National Litho Printers

== Soundtrack ==
The music was composed by K. Chakravarthy

Songs
No.	Title	Singer(s)	Length
1.	"Kavvinche Sagara Geetam"	S. P. Balasubrahmanyam, P. Susheela	4:16
2.	"Cheekati Padithe Sitharam"	S. P. Balasubrahmanyam, P. Susheela	4:37
3.	"Rumba Rumba Ho"	S. P. Balasubrahmanyam, S. P. Sailaja	4:21
4.	"Chempaku Chaaredu Kallamma"	S. P. Balasubrahmanyam, S. P. Sailaja	4:28
