= Preminchi Choodu =

Preminchi Choodu may refer to:

- Preminchi Choodu (1965 film), an Indian Telugu-language romantic comedy film
- Preminchi Choodu (1989 film), a Telugu-language comedy film
