= Santhi Nivasam =

Santhi Nivasam may refer to:

- Santhi Nivasam (1960 film), a 1960 film by C. S. Rao
- Santhi Nivasam (1986 film), a 1986 film by G. Ramamohana Rao
- Santhi Nivasam (TV series), a 2000–2001 television series
