= Raja Simham =

- Directed by: K. Raghavendra Rao
- Written by: Marudhuri Raja (dialogues)
- Story by: Satyanand
- Produced by: Ch. V. Appa Rao
- Cinematography: K. Ravindra Babu
- Edited by: Kotagiri Venkateswara Rao
- Music by: Raj–Koti
- Release date: 9 March 1995
- Country: India
- Language: Telugu

Raja Simham is a 1995 Telugu-language action comedy film directed by K. Raghavendra Rao and produced by Ch.V. Appa Rao. The film stars Rajasekhar, Ramya Krishna and Soundarya. The music was composed by Raj–Koti. It was released on 9 March 1995.

== Cast ==
- Rajasekhar as Major Raj Kumar / Chinna Raja & Shrimannarayana (Dual role)
- Ramya Krishna as Lata
- Soundarya as Sundari
- Ranganath
- Kaikala Satyanarayana as Kukka Raja
- Kota Srinivasa Rao as Pilli Raja
- Sharat Saxena as Ali Khan
- Srihari
- Brahmanandam as Ashirvadam
- Mallikarjuna Rao as bank manager
- Sudhakar
- Ali
- Suthivelu
- Shubha as Shrimannarayana's mother
- Vijaya Lalitha
- Sangeeta
- Sudha
- Jayalalita

== Soundtrack ==
All music is composed by Raj–Koti. The song "Daayi Daayi" is based on the Kannada song "Jama Jama Jamaisi", which was also composed by Raj-Koti for the Kannada film Gadibidi Aliya

Track listing
No.	Title	Lyrics	Singer(s)	Length
1.	"Oka Chinna Maata"	Veturi	Mano, K. S. Chithra	4:58
2.	"Daayi Daayi"	Veturi	S. P. Balasubrahmanyam, K. S. Chithra	6:27
3.	"Uskuladi Kiskuready"	Veturi	S. P. Balasubrahmanyam, K. S. Chithra	4:46
4.	"Suvvi Ee Takkari"	Vennelakanti	S. P. Balasubrahmanyam, K. S. Chithra	4:42
5.	"Ammayi Kallu"	Bhuvanachandra	S. P. Balasubrahmanyam, K. S. Chithra	5:00
6.	"Indumathi Charumathi"	Sirivennela Seetharama Sastry	S. P. Balasubrahmanyam, K. S. Chithra	4:08
Total length:				30:01
