= Chikkadu Dorakadu =

Chikkadu Dorakadu may refer to

- Chikkadu Dorakadu (1967 film)
- Chikkadu Dorakadu (1988 film)
