= Jhansi Rani (1988 film) =

- VCD cover
- Directed by: Satyanand
- Screenplay by: Satyanand
- Story by: Malladi Venkata Krishna Murthy
- Based on: Mr. V (Novel)
- Produced by: Midde Rama Rao
- Starring: Rajendra Prasad; Bhanupriya
- Cinematography: D. D. Prasad
- Edited by: D. Venkataratnam
- Music by: Chakravarthy
- Production company: Sri Rajyalakshmi Art Pictures
- Release date: 13 June 1988
- Running time: 128 mins
- Country: India
- Language: Telugu

Jhansi Rani is a 1988 Telugu-language thriller film, produced by Midde Rama Rao under the Sri Rajyalakshmi Art Pictures banner and directed by Satyanand. It stars Rajendra Prasad, Bhanupriya and music composed by Chakravarthy. The film is based on Malladi Venkata Krishna Murthy's novel Mr. V.

== Cast ==
- Rajendra Prasad as Sriraj / Mr.V
- Bhanupriya as Jhansi Rani
- Daggupati Raja as Dinakar
- Jaggayya as Advocate Jagadish Chandra
- Kanta Rao as Jhansi's uncle
- Suthi Veerabhadra Rao as Velu's uncle
- Suthi Velu as Constable Velaki Velu
- Subhalekha Sudhakar as Chanti
- Kota Srinivasa Rao as Neelakantham, CB-CID Officer
- Ali as Nani
- P. J. Sarma as Advocate Jagannatham
- Sakshi Ranga Rao as Garudachalam
- Banerjee as Raju
- Balaji as Pratap Kumar
- Hema Sundar as Judge
- Potti Prasad
- KK Sarma as Durvasa Murthy
- Annapurna as Lakshmi
- Poornima as Radha
- Rajyalakshmi as Sampoorna
- Mucherla Aruna as Selvarani
- Radha Kumari as Selvarani's mother
- Srilakshmi as Velu's wife

== Soundtrack ==
Jhansi Rani

Film score by Chakravarthy
- Released: 1988
- Genre: Soundtrack
- Length: 10:26
- Label: AVM Audio
- Producer: Chakravarthy

Chakravarthy chronology
Anna Chellelu (1988)	Jhansi Rani (1988)	Jeevana Ganga (1988)

Music composed by Chakravarthy. Lyrics were written by Veturi. Music released on AVM Audio Company.

S. No.	Song title	Singers	length
1	"Pranayaniki Puttina Roju"	S. P. Balasubrahmanyam, P. Susheela	3:39
2	"Ativa Kopam Adhara"	S. P. Balasubrahmanyam, P.Susheela	3:23
3	"Repo Mapo Pellanta"	Mano, S. Janaki	3:24
