= Khilladi Mappillai =

- Poster
- Directed by: J. George Prasad
- Written by: M. S. Kamalesh Kumar (dialogues)
- Screenplay by: J. George Prasad
- Story by: Aadi Vishnu
- Produced by: Jothi Prasad
- Starring: Pandiarajan; Sindhuja; Divyasri
- Cinematography: Babji
- Edited by: N. Benerji
- Music by: Deva
- Production company: Maruthi Art Films
- Release date: 26 August 1994
- Running time: 130 minutes
- Country: India
- Language: Tamil

Khilladi Mappillai (transl. Clever groom) is a 1994 Indian Tamil language comedy film, directed by J. George Prasad. The film stars Pandiarajan, Sindhuja and Divyasri, with Vennira Aadai Moorthy, C. R. Saraswathi, S. S. Chandran, Vadivelu, Jayalalita and Chinni Jayanth playing supporting roles. It was released on 26 August 1994. This film is a remake of the Telugu film Jayammu Nischayammu Raa (1989). The film became a failure at the box office.

== Plot ==
Rajaram (Pandiarajan) and his friend Dhanapal (Chinni Jayanth) are college students and they live together. Rajaram's father (Mohan Gandhiraman) decides to arrange the wedding between Rajaram and his relative Sarasu (Divyasri), who is very outspoken. Rajaram is at first reluctant about this marriage, but he accepts because of his father's insistence. Sarasu really loves Rajaram. In the meantime, Rajaram falls in love with the college girl Shanthi (Sindhuja). When Rajaram proposes his love for Shanthi, she rejects it. Shanthi, even so, advises him to convince her parents. What transpires later forms the crux of the story.

== Cast ==
- Pandiarajan as Rajaram
- Sindhuja as Shanthi
- Divyasri as Sarasu
- Vennira Aadai Moorthy as Jagannadhan, Shanthi's father
- C. R. Saraswathi as Meenakshi, Shanthi's mother
- S. S. Chandran as Dhanapal's father
- Vadivelu as Gangamma's husband
- Jayalalita as Gangamma
- Chinni Jayanth as Dhanapal
- Meesai Murugesan as Periyasamy
- Vinodh as Prathap
- Mohan Gandhiraman as Rajaram's father
- Srilekha
- Lakshmi Priya
- Bindu Madhavi
- Loose Mohan as Swamy
- Thideer Kannaiah
- Vellai Subbaiah
- R. Sarathkumar as himself (cameo appearance)

== Soundtrack ==
The soundtrack was composed by Deva, with lyrics written by Vaali.

Song	Singer(s)	Duration
"Emma Emma"	Swarnalatha	4:04
"Kanchi Kamatchi"	Mano	4:17
"Kadhal Duet"	Mano, Sindhu	4:37
"Ovanna Solli"	Mano, K. S. Chithra	4:09
"Elumicham Pazham"	Krishnaraj, Sindhu	4:25

== Reception ==
K. Vijiyan of New Sunday Times wrote that the film suffered from lack of good plot and a good director.
