= Mechanic Alludu =

- Theatrical release poster
- Directed by: B. Gopal
- Written by: Satyanand (story / dialogues)
- Screenplay by: B. Gopal
- Produced by: Allu Aravind
- Starring: Akkineni Nageswara Rao; Chiranjeevi; Vijayashanti
- Cinematography: Lok Singh
- Edited by: Vellaiswamy
- Music by: Raj–Koti
- Production company: Geetha Arts
- Release date: 27 May 1993
- Running time: 146 mins
- Country: India
- Language: Telugu

Mechanic Alludu (transl. The Mechanic Son-in-law) is a 1993 Telugu-language action comedy film directed by B. Gopal. It stars Akkineni Nageswara Rao, Chiranjeevi, Vijayashanti with music composed by Raj–Koti. The film was produced by Allu Aravind under the Geetha Arts banner.

== Cast ==
- Akkineni Nageswara Rao as Jagannatham
- Chiranjeevi as Ravi
- Vijayashanti as Chitti
- Satyanarayana as Narayana
- Kota Srinivasa Rao as Kotappa
- Brahmanandam as Babji
- Sudhakar as Raja
- Ali
- Mohan Raj
- Ponnambalam
- Prasad Babu
- Sharada as Mahalakshmi
- Shubha as Parvathi
- Jayalalita as Pankajam
- Hema
- Disco Shanthi as item number
- Thalapathy Dinesh

== Soundtrack ==
Mechanic Alludu

Soundtrack album by Raj–Koti
- Released: 1993
- Genre: Soundtrack
- Length: 33:08
- Label: Lahari Music
- Producer: Raj–Koti

Raj–Koti chronology
Bangaru Bullodu (1993)	Mechanic Alludu (1993)	Nakshatra Poratam (1993)

Music composed by Raj–Koti. Music released on Lahari Music Company.

No.	Title	Lyrics	Singer(s)	Length
1.	"Premiste Pranamistha"	Bhuvana Chandra	S. P. Balasubrahmanyam	4:19
2.	"Chekka Chekka Chemma Chekka"	Bhuvana Chandra	S. P. Balasubrahmanyam, Chitra	4:44
3.	"Guruvaa Guruvaa"	Bhuvana Chandra	S. P. Balasubrahmanyam, S. P. Sailaja	6:25
4.	"Gunthalakkadi Gundamma"	Bhuvana Chandra	S. P. Balasubrahmanyam, Chitra	5:20
5.	"Amba Palikindi"	Veturi	S. P. Balasubrahmanyam, Chitra	6:28
6.	"Jummane Tummeda Veta"	Bhuvana Chandra	S. P. Balasubrahmanyam, Chitra	5:52
Total length:				33:08
