= Pekata Papa Rao =

- Title card
- Directed by: Y. Nageswara Rao
- Written by: Tanikella Bharani (dialogues)
- Screenplay by: Y. Nageswara Rao
- Story by: M. S. Narayana; Janardhan Maharshi. P.S.Ramachandrudu
- Produced by: T. Govinda Reddy; Pantangi Pullayah; D. V. V. Ramana Reddy
- Starring: Rajendra Prasad; Khushbu
- Cinematography: Suresh
- Edited by: J. Narsimha Rao
- Music by: Raj–Koti
- Production company: Uma Maheswara Movies
- Release date: 8 September 1993
- Running time: 121 mins
- Country: India
- Language: Telugu

Pekata Papa Rao is a 1993 Indian Telugu-language comedy film directed by Y. Nageswara Rao. It stars Rajendra Prasad, Khushbu with music composed by Raj–Koti. The film was recorded as a hit at the box office.

== Cast ==
- Rajendra Prasad as Pekata Papa Rao
- Khushbu as Uma
- Brahmanandam as Constable Neelakantam
- Ali as Abdullah
- Tanikella Bharani as Harichandra
- Gundu Hanumantha Rao as Gundu
- Sivaji Raja as Sivaji
- Prasanna Kumar
- Ironleg Sastri as Gapathi Sastry
- Chidatala Appa Rao as Appa Rao
- Kadambari Kiran
- Gadiraju Subba Rao as Paalavadu
- Jenny as doctor
- Haritha as Aadi Lakshmi
- Chandrika as item number
- Nirmalamma as Ramanamma

== Soundtrack ==
Pekata Papa Rao

Film score by Raj–Koti
- Released: 1993
- Genre: Soundtrack
- Length: 21:48
- Label: Supreme Music
- Producer: Raj–Koti

Raj–Koti chronology
Radha Saradhi (1993)	Pekata Papa Rao (1993)	Pelli Gola (1993)

Music composed by Raj–Koti. Music released on Supreme Music Company.

No.	Title	Lyrics	Singer(s)	Length
1.	"Pekata Papa Rao"	Sirivennela Sitarama Sastry	S. P. Balasubrahmanyam	4:33
2.	"Tailamista"	Sirivennela Sitarama Sastry	Chitra	4:09
3.	"Edendiroy"	Guduru Viswanatha Sastry	S. P. Balasubrahmanyam, Chitra	4:18
4.	"Pukare Pukare"	Jonnavithula	S. P. Balasubrahmanyam, Radhika	4:18
5.	"Prema Pettandoi"	Jonnavithhula	S. P. Balasubrahmanyam, Chitra	4:30
Total length:				21:48
