= Pranadaata =

- Directed by: A. Mohan Gandhi
- Written by: Paruchuri Brothers (story / dialogues)
- Screenplay by: A. Mohan Gandhi
- Produced by: P. Balaram
- Starring: Akkineni Nageswara Rao; Lakshmi; Harish; Charmmila
- Cinematography: Maheedhar
- Edited by: Murali-Ramaiah
- Music by: Raj–Koti
- Production company: Sri Anupama Productions
- Release date: 24 December 1992
- Running time: 121 mins
- Country: India
- Language: Telugu

Pranadaata (transl. Life Saver) is a 1992 Telugu-language drama film, produced by P. Balaram under the Sri Anupama Productions banner and directed by Mohan Gandhi. It stars Akkineni Nageswara Rao, Lakshmi, Harish, Charmmila with music composed by Raj–Koti.

== Cast ==
- Akkineni Nageswara Rao as Dr. Chakravarthy
- Lakshmi as Kamala
- Harish as Narendra
- Charmila as Jyothi
- Girish Karnad as Dr. Siva Prasad
- Allu Ramalingaiah as Aadiseshaiah
- Kota Srinivasa Rao as Dr. Govindaraju
- Brahmanandam as Babu Rao
- Babu Mohan as Kondaiah
- Pundarikakshaiah as Bapaiah
- Mouli as Special appearance
- Narra Venkateswara Rao as Jooginadham
- Bhimeswara Rao as Inspector
- Paruchuri Ravi as Naani
- Jenny as Shankaraiah
- Annapurna as Annapurna
- Jayalalita as Kalpataruvu
- Bangalore Padma as Dr. Bindu
- Chandrika as Babu Rao's wife
- Tatineni Rajeswari as Rajeswari
- Raghavamma as Aadiseshaiah's wife
- Master Rajesh as Seenu

== Soundtrack ==
Pranadaata

Film score by Raj–Koti
- Released: 1992
- Genre: Soundtrack
- Length: 18:34
- Label: Balaji Audio
- Producer: Raj–Koti

Raj–Koti chronology
Ahankhari (1992)	Pranadaata (1992)	Bangaru Mama (1992)

Music composed by Raj–Koti. Music released on Balaji Audio Company.

No.	Title	Lyrics	Singer(s)	Length
1.	"Aagipo Aagipo"	Vennelakanti	S. P. Balasubrahmanyam	4:50
2.	"You Are My Boyfriend"	D. Narayana Varma	S. P. Balasubrahmanyam, Chitra	4:26
3.	"Dhee Kotha Raa"	Veturi	S. P. Balasubrahmanyam, Chitra	4:08
4.	"Premikulam"	Sirivennela Sitarama Sastry	S. P. Balasubrahmanyam, Chitra	5:10
Total length:				18:34
