= Bala Gopaludu =

- Theatrical release poster
- Directed by: Kodi Ramakrishna
- Written by: Satyanand (dialogues)
- Screenplay by: Kodi Ramakrishna
- Story by: P.B.R. Arts Unit
- Produced by: M. R. V. Prasad
- Starring: Nandamuri Balakrishna; Suhasini; Rekha
- Cinematography: Sarath
- Edited by: Suresh Tata
- Music by: Raj–Koti
- Production company: P. B. R. Art Productions
- Release date: 13 October 1989
- Running time: 148 minutes
- Country: India
- Language: Telugu

Bala Gopaludu is a 1989 Indian Telugu-language film produced by M. R. V. Prasad under the P. B. R. Art Productions banner and directed by Kodi Ramakrishna. It stars Nandamuri Balakrishna, Suhasini and Rekha music composed by Raj–Koti. This film is the debut of Nandamuri Kalyan Ram as child artist.

== Cast ==
- Nandamuri Balakrishna as Bangaru Muvva Bala Gopalam
- Suhasini as Rekha
- Rekha as Kantham
- Rao Gopal Rao as Narasimham
- Allu Ramalingaiyah as Lingaiah
- Jaggayya as Chandra Shekar Rao
- Mohan Babu as Govinda Babu
- Giri Babu as Tikkanna
- Mallikarjuna Rao as School Master
- Chitti Babu as Raj
- Hema Sundar as Narasaiah
- Bhimiswara Rao as Officer
- Madan Mohan as Drama Artist
- Jaya Bhaskar as Orphanage Warden
- Chidatala Appa Rao as Kung Fu master
- Tata Appa Rao as Doctor
- Gadiraju Subba Rao as Officer
- Juttu Narasimham as Dead body
- Hema as Rekha's friend
- Mamatha as Amba Shetty
- Kuaili as Nagaratnam
- Samyuktha as Rekha's friend
- Master Nandamuri Kalyan Ram as Raja
- Baby Raasi as Lakshmi

== Production ==
The film was shot in Gobichettipalayam.

== Soundtrack ==
Bala Gopaludu

Film score by Raj–Koti
- Released: 1989
- Genre: Soundtrack
- Length: 28:38
- Label: LEO Audio
- Producer: Raj–Koti

Raj–Koti chronology
Lankeswarudu (1989)	Bala Gopaludu (1989)	Vicky Daada (1989)

Music composed by Raj–Koti. Lyrics written by Veturi.

No.	Title	Singer(s)	Length
1.	"Okate Thanuvantha"	S. P. Balasubrahmanyam, Chitra	4:28
2.	"Bava Bava Banthi Puvva"	S. P. Balasubrahmanyam, S. Janaki	4:25
3.	"Chakkanamma Pakkanunte"	S. P. Balasubrahmanyam, S. Janaki	4:13
4.	"Sitika Meda Sitikalaie"	S. P. Balasubrahmanyam	6:30
5.	"Suvvi Suvvi"	S. P. Balasubrahmanyam, P. Susheela	4:22
6.	"Dont Worry Be Happy"	S. P. Balasubrahmanyam, S. Janaki	4:40
Total length:			28:38
