= Mandaladeesudu =

- Directed by: M. Prabhakar Reddy
- Produced by: Dr. DVN Raju
- Starring: Kota Srinivasa Rao; Bhanumathi; Jamuna; Gummadi
- Music by: Raj–Koti
- Release date: 26 February 1987
- Country: India
- Language: Telugu

Mandaladeesudu (Telugu: Maṇḍalādhīśuḍu, lit. 'Sub-district head') is a 1987 Indian Telugu-language satirical film directed by M. Prabhakar Reddy and starring Kota Srinivasa Rao in the main role. The film was based on the then chief minister of Andhra Pradesh N. T. Rama Rao, causing the film's production to be controversial and both negatively and positively impacting Rao's career.

== Plot ==
The famous actor Bhima Rao (a parody of N. T. Rama Rao) shifts to politics, using theatrics, making impossible promises and cutting backroom deals to try to win the election.

== Cast ==
- Kota Srinivasa Rao as Bhima Rao
- P. Bhanumathi
- Jamuna
- Gummadi

== Production ==
Mandaladeesudu was made by Krishna during a low point in his relationship with Rama Rao. Already major rivals in the film industry, their animosity increased after Rama Rao entered politics with the formation of the Telugu Desam Party and eventually became the chief minister of pre-bifurication Andhra Pradesh in 1983, with Krishna entering the Congress Party in response. During this period, Krishna made three films criticizing Rama Rao, with Mandaladeesudu being one of them. Initially, no one "dared" to play Rama Rao, especially leading actors, and even when Kota Srinivasa Rao, considered a "character actor", was cast for the part, he was fearful of the potential backlash.

== Reception ==
According to Rao, he was blacklisted by some directors and producers in the industry that supported NTR after the film's release, and was also involved in an incident where he was confronted and beaten by a mob of Telugu Desam Party supporters at a train station. Posani Krishna Murali has stated that NTR himself actually approved of Rao's performance and went on to say that the character was indistinguishable from him. Rao also stated in a 2021 interview that NTR appreciated his performance, but that his son and fellow actor Balakrishna spat in his face when he encountered him during another film shooting in Rajahmundry sometime during the 1990s. Later on, Jandhyala decided to cast Rao as the miser character Lakshmipathy in the film Aha Naa-Pellanta! based on his acting in Mandaladeesudu despite the initial objections of producer D. Ramanaidu, with both the film and the character becoming a huge success.
