= Prema Zindabad =

- Directed by: Jandhyala
- Screenplay by: Jandhyala
- Story by: Aadi Vishnu; Shankaramanchi Parthasaradhi
- Produced by: B. A. V. Sandilya; V. Bhoopal Reddy
- Starring: Rajendra Prasad; Aiswarya
- Cinematography: Babji
- Edited by: Gautam Raju
- Music by: Madhavapeddi Suresh
- Production company: Sangeetha Art Films
- Release date: 1990
- Running time: 121 mins
- Country: India
- Language: Telugu

Prema Zindabad (transl. Long Live Love) is a 1990 Telugu-language comedy film, produced by B. A. V. Sandilya and V. Bhoopal Reddy under the Sangeetha Art Films banner and directed by Jandhyala. It stars Rajendra Prasad and Aiswarya, with music composed by Madhavapeddi Suresh.

== Cast ==
- Rajendra Prasad as Gopalam
- Aiswarya as Bharati
- Subhalekha Sudhakar as Anjaneyulu
- Kota Srinivasa Rao as S.I. Ahobilam
- Brahmanandam as Charplin Nataraju
- Suthi Velu as Muddu Krishna
- Dharmavarapu Subramanyam as Head Constable
- Subbaraya Sharma as Bose Babu
- Ashok Kumar as S.P.
- Nittela as Denthal Murthy
- Kadambari Kiran
- Jenny as Neelakantam

== Soundtrack ==
Prema Zindabad

Film score by Madhapeddi Suresh
- Released: 1990
- Genre: Soundtrack
- Length: 17:39
- Label: Cauvery Audio
- Producer: Madhapeddi Suresh

Madhapeddi Suresh chronology
| Ramba Rambabu (1990) | Prema Zindabad (1990) | Babai Hotel (1991) |

Music composed by Madhapeddi Suresh. The music has been released by the Cauvery Audio Company.

| S. No. | Song title | Lyrics | Singers | length |
|---|---|---|---|---|
| 1 | "Kalaham Viraham Tamakam" | Jonnavithhula Ramalingeswara Rao | S. P. Balasubrahmanyam, Chitra | 4:20 |
| 2 | "Anandam Edantha" | Veturi | Mano, Chitra | 4:19 |
| 3 | "Srungaramga Sirimuddu Pettukona" | Veturi | S. P. Balasubrahmanyam, Chitra | 4:41 |
| 4 | "ABC Raani Ebhrasiro" | Veturi | S. P. Balasubrahmanyam | 4:19 |
