= Iddaru Iddare =

- Theatrical release poster
- Directed by: A. Kodandarami Reddy
- Written by: Ganesh Patro(dialogues)
- Screenplay by: A. Kodandarami Reddy
- Story by: S. S. Creations Unit; Bhamidipati Radhakrishna
- Produced by: Akkineni Venkat; Yarllagada Surendra
- Starring: Akkineni Nageswara Rao; Nagarjuna; Ramya Krishna
- Cinematography: P. S. Prakash
- Edited by: D. Venkataratnam
- Music by: Raj–Koti
- Production companies: Annapurna Studios; S. S. Creations
- Release date: 5 September 1990
- Running time: 141 minutes
- Country: India
- Language: Telugu

Iddaru Iddare (transl. They are equals) is a 1990 Telugu-language action drama film, produced by Akkineni Venkat and Yarllagada Surendra under Annapurna Studios and S.S. Creations banner and directed by A. Kodandarami Reddy. It stars Akkineni Nageswara Rao, Nagarjuna and Ramya Krishna, with music composed by Raj–Koti.

== Cast ==
- Akkineni Nageswara Rao as Justice Madhusudhan Rao
- Nagarjuna as Ravibabu
- K. R. Vijaya as Lakshmi
- Ramya Krishna as Aruna
- Kota Srinivasa Rao as Ramadasu / Thulasi Das
- Gollapudi Maruthi Rao as Raghava Rao
- Rama Prabha as Ramanamma
- Ranganath as Jayaram
- Babu Mohan
- Mallikarjuna Rao
- Jaya Prakash Reddy as Ramireddy
- Anand Raj as Teja
- Keerikkadan Jose as Joseph
- Husain as Husain

== Soundtrack ==
Music composed by Raj–Koti. Music released on LEO Audio Company.

No.	Title	Lyrics	Singer(s)	Length
1.	"Onamalu Nerpalani"	Sirivennela Seetharama Sastry	S. P. Balasubrahmanyam	5:05
2.	"Pitta Lotti"	Sirivennela Seetharama Sastry	S. P. Balasubrahmanyam, Chitra	6:39
3.	"Ori Devudo"	Sirivennela Seetharama Sastry	S. P. Balasubrahmanyam, Chitra	6:11
4.	"Abbaiyule Cheppana"	Sirivennela Seetharama Sastry	Mano, Chitra	4:59
5.	"Paisalunna Papalendi"	Veturi	S. P. Balasubrahmanyam, S. P. Sailaja	4:24
Total length:				27:18
