= Bazaar Rowdy =

- Theatrical release poster
- Directed by: A. Kodandarami Reddy
- Written by: G. Satyamurthy
- Produced by: U. Suryanarayana Babu; Krishna (Presents)
- Starring: Ramesh Babu; Nadhiya; Gautami; Seetha; Mahesh Babu
- Cinematography: N. Sudhakar Reddy
- Edited by: D. Venkataratnam
- Music by: Raj–Koti
- Production company: Padmavathi Films
- Release date: 12 August 1988
- Country: India
- Language: Telugu

Bazaar Rowdy (transl. Street goon) is a 1988 Indian Telugu-language action drama film directed by A. Kodandarami Reddy. It stars Ramesh Babu, Nadhiya, Gautami, Seetha, Mahesh Babu. The film was produced by U. Suryanarayana Babu under the Padmavathi Films banner and was presented by Krishna.

Music of the film was composed by Raj–Koti. Until this film, Kodandarami Reddy has collaborated only with K. Chakravarthy and Ilaiyaraaja as music composers. The film also marked the Telugu debut of actress, Nadhiya.

== Cast ==
- Ramesh Babu as Ranjeeth
- Nadhiya as Sirisha & Sarika (Dual role)
- Gautami as Manga
- Seetha as Lalitha
- Mahesh Babu as Mahesh
- Satyanarayana as Ahobala Rao
- Allu Ramalingaiah as Ambhujam's father
- Prabhakar Reddy as Bhanoji Rao
- Subhalekha Sudhakar as Mohan
- Pradeep Shakti as CBI Officer Pradeep
- Kota Srinivasa Rao as Bujji Pandu
- Ramana Murthy as Master
- P. J. Sarma as Dr. Sundara Murthy
- Bhimiswara Rao as Sirisha's father
- Jaya Bhaskar as Inspector
- Telephone Satyanarayana as Governor
- Shubha as Lawyer
- Kalpana Rai as Rangamma
- Y. Vijaya as Ambhujam
- Nirmalamma as Parvathamma

=== Special appearance ===
- Krishna as himself
- Radha as herself

== Soundtrack ==
Bazaar Rowdy

Film score by Raj–Koti
- Released: 1988
- Genre: Soundtrack
- Length: 17:58
- Label: Cauvery Audio
- Producer: Raj–Koti

Raj–Koti chronology
Rowdy No.1 (1988)	Bazaar Rowdy (1988)	Maharajasri Mayagadu (1988)

Music composed by Raj–Koti. Lyrics were written by Veturi. Music released on Cauvery Audio Company.

S. No.	Song title	Singers	length
1	"Chakkiligili Chikkulamudi"	S. P. Balasubrahmanyam, S. Janaki	3:34
2	"Singarakko Siggenduke"	S. P. Balasubrahmanyam, P. Susheela	4:18
3	"O Prema"	S. P. Balasubrahmanyam, P. Susheela	4:31
4	"Taakamaaka Taggamaaka"	S. P. Balasubrahmanyam, P. Susheela	4:29
5	"Kotta Pellikutura"	S. P. Balasubrahmanyam, S. Janaki	4:06
