= Jenny (actor) =

Indian comedian and artist

- Born: Pollapragada Janardhana Rao; Andhra Pradesh, India
- Occupation: Actor
- Years active: 1980s–present

Pollapragada Janardhana Rao, popularly known as Jenny, is an Indian comedian and artist, who appears in Telugu films and television. Jenny is from Godavari District, Andhra Pradesh. He is a mime artist. He has performed at over 1,000 shows in India as well as abroad. He acted in comic roles in more than 400 films and on television. He also did mime in many government funded TV ads.

== Filmography ==
=== Telugu ===
- Karu Diddina Kapuram (1986)
- Padamati Sandhya Ragam (1987)
- Chandamama Raave (1987)
- Aha Naa Pellanta (1987) as Server in star hotel
- O Bharya Katha (1988) as Priest
- Intinti Bhagavatham (1988)
- Choopulu Kalasina Subhavela (1988)
- Vijay (1989) as Defence Council member
- Prema (1989)
- Indrudu Chandrudu (1989)
- Paila Pachessu (1989)
- Prema Khaidi (1990)
- Yuvabharatham (1990)
- Prema Zindabad (1990)
- Rowdy Gaari Pellam (1991)
- Surigadu (1992)
- Champion (1992)
- Pranadaata (1992)
- Mondi Mogudu Penki Pellam (1992)
- Ahankari (1992)
- Mayadari Mosagadu (1993)
- Pekata Papa Rao (1993)
- Mister Pellam (1993)
- Ladies Special (1993)
- Mayalodu (1993)
- One by Two (1993)
- Money (1993)
- Aadarsham (1993)
- Hello Brother (1994)
- Lucky Chance (1994)
- Kishkindha Kanda (1994)
- Yamaleela (1994)
- Criminal (1994)
- Street Fighter (1995) as Subba Rao
- Khaidi Inspector (1995) as Subbarayudu
- Alibaba Adbhuta Deepam (1995) as Seth
- Pokiri Raja (1995)
- Amma Durgamma (1996)
- Once More (1996)
- Adirindi Alludu (1996)
- Vinodam (1996)
- Bobbili Bullodu (1996)
- Maavichiguru (1996)
- Pelli Sandadi (1996)
- Kuthuru (1996)
- Pittala Dora (1996)
- Adhirindhi Alludu (1996)
- Gunshot (1996)
- Oho Naa Pellanta (1996)
- Pelli Sandadi (1996)
- Anaganaga Oka Roju (1997)
- Priyamaina Srivaru (1997)
- Annamayya (1997)
- Priya O Priya (1997)
- Master (1997)
- Maa Pelliki Randi (2000)
- Manasichanu (2000)
- Uncle (2000)
- Anandam (2001)
- Inspector Vikram (2001)
- Ishtam (2001)
- Jayam (2002)
- Nee Sneham (2002)
- Pellam Oorelithe (2003)
- Simhachalam (2003) as Doctor
- Tagore (2003)
- Villain (2003)
- Satyam (2003)
- Nee Manasu Naaku Telusu (2003)
- Nenu (2004)
- Nenunnanu (2004)
- Pedababu (2004)
- Valliddari Vayasu Padahare (2006)
- Samanyudu (2006)
- Khatarnak (2006)
- Bhale Dongalu (2008)
- Dabbu Bhale Jabbu (2008)
- Pandurangadu (2008)
- Ready (2008)
- Victory (2008)
- Black & White (2008)
- Shubhapradam (2010)
- Namo Venkatesa (2010)
- Parama Veera Chakra (2011)
- Shirdi Sai (2012)
- Ayyare (2012)
- Sevakudu (2013)
- Naayak (2013)
- Baadshah (2013)
- Sukumarudu (2013)
- Masala (2013)
- Aagadu (2014)
- Noothilo Kappalu (2015)
- Vaisakham (2017)
- Gorre Puranam (2024)

==== Television ====
- Lady Detective (1995)
- Amrutham as Various Characters (2001 - 2007)

=== Tamil ===
- Enakku 20 Unakku 18 (2003)
- Gajendra (2004)
- Kedi (2006)

=== Hindi ===
- Criminal (1995)
