= Raja Vikramarka (1990 film) =

1990 Telugu film directed by Ravi Raja Pinisetty

- Theatrical release poster
- Directed by: Ravi Raja Pinisetty
- Screenplay by: Ravi Raja Pinisetty
- Story by: Ravi Raja Pinisetty; Satyanand
- Produced by: P. Amaranatha Reddy
- Starring: Chiranjeevi; Radhika; Amala
- Cinematography: Lok Singh
- Edited by: Vellaiswamy
- Music by: Raj–Koti
- Production company: Skhandha Arts
- Distributed by: Geetha Arts
- Release date: 14 November 1990
- Running time: 154 minutes
- Country: India
- Language: Telugu

Raja Vikramarka is a 1990 Indian Telugu-language film directed by Ravi Raja Pinisetty and produced by P. Amaranatha Reddy under the Sandhya Arts banner. It stars Chiranjeevi, Radhika and Amala, the film features music composed by Raj–Koti, marking their 100th project. It was dubbed into Tamil as Sathiyama Naan Kavalkaran and Hindi as Daulat Ki Duniya.

== Plot ==
Raja Vikramarka is the prince of Skanda Dweepam, a small kingdom. As he is a prince, he is not allowed to live his own free life. His father Raja Bhupathi arranges his marriage with another kingdom's princess. She turns out to be nothing more than a sycophant, one without a brain or spine of her own. Vikramarka leaves the kingdom along with his trusted friend, Jockie, to live his own life. In the modern big city, he finds a friend and works as a mechanic, during which time he saves a woman Rekha from two attempts on her life. Her uncle Vishwanatham hires him as her bodyguard. Viswanatham later reveals to him that he was in fact the assassin trying to kill her for her money. To thwart his plot, Vikramarka agrees to handle the murder attempts, while at the same time trying to save her. After being thrown out of the house, Viswanatham, along with his allies Kanaka Rao and Raja Kotappa join forces to kill Vikramarka and his parents. Vikramarka saves the day and rules as king of his land.

== Cast ==
- Chiranjeevi as Raja Vikramarka, a prince
- Radhika as Maya
- Amala as Rekha
- Rao Gopal Rao as Viswanatham, Rekha's uncle and an assassin
- Kaikala Satyanarayana as Raja Bhupathi
- Kota Srinivasa Rao as Raja Kotappa
- Allu Rama Lingaiah as Joginatham
- Brahmanandam as Janaki / Jockey
- Gollapudi Maruti Rao as Kanaka Rao
- Sudhakar as Kireeti
- King Kong as Tarjan
- K. R. Vijaya as Queen
- Annapurna as Savitri
- Sri Lakshmi as Mangala
- Srilatha
- Sandhya
- Narayana Rao as Ganapathi
- Hari Prasad as Hari
- Prasad Babu as Thangavelu
- Manik Irani as Billa
- Nalinikanth
- Arun Kumar
- Vijay Kumar
- Jaggarao
- Ashok Kumar
- Anjaneyulu
- Seshagiri Rao
- Madhava Rao

== Production ==
The production of Raja Vikramarka began on August 7, 1989, in Bangalore. The film marked the only collaboration between Chiranjeevi and Amala, with Radhika also playing a lead role. Rajinikanth, who was in Bangalore at the time, attended the launch as the chief guest and gave the inaugural clap for the film.

During the production of Raja Vikramarka, Chiranjeevi committed to his debut Hindi film, Pratibandh (1990), leading to overlapping schedules. Producer Amaranatha Reddy reassured him and adjusted the timelines, allowing Chiranjeevi to complete Pratibandh during the dates originally allocated for Raja Vikramarka. Interestingly, the Raja Vikramarka's director, Ravi Raja Pinisetty, also directed Pratibandh.

The production faced further delays due to various factors. Amala traveled to the United States, while Radhika left for London during the filming. As a result, the film, which began in 1989, took 13 months to complete and release.

A few scenes from the film were reportedly inspired by the 1988 American film Coming to America.

== Music ==
Raja Vikramarka

Soundtrack album by Raj–Koti
- Released: 1990
- Recorded: 1990
- Genre: Film soundtrack
- Label: Aditya Music
- Producer: Raj–Koti

The soundtrack was composed by the duo Raj–Koti, their 100th soundtrack as composers. The album consists of six songs. Lyrics for all songs were penned by Veturi.

No.	Title	Lyrics	Singer(s)	Length
1.	"Erraroi"	Veturi	S. P. Balasubrahmanyam	4:48
2.	"Ellelo"	Veturi	S. P. Balasubrahmanyam, S. Janaki	5:05
3.	"Gagana Kirana"	Veturi	S. P. Balasubrahmanyam, K. S. Chithra, Radhika	6:04
4.	"Aanatinundi"	Veturi	S. P. Balasubrahmanyam, P. Susheela	4:52
5.	"Naginivo"	Veturi	S. P. Balasubrahmanyam, K. S. Chithra,	5:27
6.	"Bhala Changu Bhala"	Veturi	S. P. Balasubrahmanyam, K. S. Chithra	6:35
Total length:				31:35

== Reception ==
Despite its grand scale, innovative backdrop, and significant budget, Raja Vikramarka did not achieve the anticipated success at the box office.
