= Pradeep Shakthi =

Indian actor, director and businessman

- Born: 25 July 1954
- Died: 20 February 2016 (aged 61)
- Occupations: Film actor, Director, Business man
- Years active: 1985-1994; 2008-2015

Pradeep Shakthi (25 July 1954 – 20 February 2016) was an Indian Telugu actor, director and businessman.

Pradeep Shakthi, born Raja Vasireddy, was from the Guntur district of Andhra Pradesh. He was reintroduced to Telugu cinema by director Vamsy in the film Aalaapana (1985). He acted in many Telugu and Tamil films, mostly in negative roles. He also directed a politically controversial film, 1990 Kaliyuga Viswamithra (1989). He migrated to the US in 1993 and settled in Staten Island, New York, where he became a full-time restaurateur.

== Filmography ==
=== Actor ===
Telugu

- Anthuleni Katha (1976)
- Pantulamma (1977)
- Maa Bhoomi(1979)
- Aalaapana (1985)
- Ladies Tailor (1986)
- Lawyer Suhasini (1987)
- Saradhamba (1987)
- Rakshasa Samharam (1987) as Jackal
- Thene Manasulu (1987) as Photographer
- Bazaar Rowdy (1988)
- Anna Chellelu (1988)
- Janaki Ramudu (1988)
- Veguchukka Pagatichukka (1988)
- Aakhari Poratam (1988)
- Raktha Tilakam (1988)
- August 15 Raatri (1988)
- Donga Kollu (1988)
- Marana Mrudangam (1988)
- Indrudu Chandrudu (1989)
- Chettu Kinda Pleader (1989)
- Simha Swapnam (1989)
- Two Town Rowdy (1989)
- Prema (1989)
- Vintha Dongalu (1989) as Kareem Bhai
- Raktha Kanneeru (1989) as Srinivasulu
- Rajakeeya Chadarangam (1989)
- Koduku Diddina Kapuram (1989)
- Ashoka Chakravarthy (1989)
- Geethanjali (1989)
- Kondaveeti Rowdy (1990)
- Bobbili Raja (1990)
- Raktha Jwala (1990)
- Chinnari Muddula Papa (1990)
- Neti Siddhartha (1990)
- Ghatana (1990)
- Aggiramudu (1990)
- April 1 Vidudala (1991)
- Agni Nakshatram (1991)
- Shri Edukondalu Swamy (1991) as Shani
- Chitram Bhalare Vichitram (1991)
- Brahma (1992)
- Chakravyuham (1992)
- Samarpana (1992)
- Vasthavam (1993)
- Nakshatra Poratam (1993)
- Kirayi Gunda (1993)
- Kalikalam Aadadhi (1994)
- Parugo Parugu (1994)
- Anna (1994)
- Prema & Co (1994)
- Chintakayala Ravi (2008)
- Gopi Gopika Godavari (2009)
- Chinna Cinema (2013)
- Subramanyam for Sale (2015)

Tamil

- Nayakan (1987)
- Jeeva (1988)
- Kaliyugam (1988)
- Sathya (1988)
- Pen Puthi Mun Puthi (1988)
- Rajadhi Raja (1989)
- En Rathathin Rathame (1989)
- Aadi Velli (1990)
- Idhaya Thamarai (1990)
- Maruthu Pandi (1990)
- Michael Madana Kama Rajan (1990)
- Bramma (1991)
- Gunaa (1991)
- Thalapathi (1991)
- Meera (1992)
- Valli (1993)
- Madurai Meenakshi (1993)

Malayalam

- Chamaram (1980)
- Aattakatha (1987)
- Vice Chancellor (1988)
- Keli Kottu (1990)
- Iyer The Great (1990)
- Aakasha Kottayile Sultan (1991)
- Kalamorukkam (1991)
- Gandeevam (1994)
- Ladies and Gentleman (2001)

Hindi

- Khatron Ke Khiladi (1988)

Kannada

- Lockup Death (1994)

=== Director ===
- Kaliyuga Vishwamitra (1989)
