= Thene Manasulu (1987 film) =

1987 Telugu film by Rajendra Singh Babu

- Poster
- Directed by: Rajendra Singh Babu
- Written by: Rajendra Singh Babu; Satyanand
- Produced by: K. C. N. Chandrasekhar
- Starring: Krishna; Jaya Prada; Suhasini
- Cinematography: V. S. R. Swamy
- Edited by: Kotagiri Gopala Rao
- Music by: Bappi Lahiri
- Production company: KCN Films
- Release date: 24 April 1987
- Country: India
- Language: Telugu

Thene Manasulu (transl. Sweet Hearts) is a 1987 Indian Telugu-language film written and directed by Rajendra Singh Babu, produced by K. C. N. Chandrasekhar for KCN Films starring Krishna, Jaya Prada and Suhasini. Bappi Lahiri scored and composed the film's soundtrack. The film was a remake of Hindi film Souten. Krishna had debuted with the 1965 film of the same name Thene Manasulu.

== Cast ==
- Krishna as Krishnamohan
- Jaya Prada as Rukmini
- Suhasini as Radha
- Kaikala Satyanarayana as Satyam
- Jaggayya as Rao Bahadur Ratnagiri Ranga Rao
- Nutan Prasad as Madanagopal
- Giribabu as Bhairava Murthy
- Nagesh as Seshu
- Y. Vijaya as Sarojini Devi
- Pradeep Shakti as Photographer
- Suthi Veerabhadra Rao as Madanagopal's father
- Raj Babu
- Fight Master Raju as Madanagopal's goon

== Music ==
Bappil Lahiri scored and composed the film's soundtrack. Veturi Sundararama Murthy penned the lyrics.

1. "Veedkolide Sodari — P. Susheela
2. "Alare Alare" — P. Susheela
3. "Naa Praname" — P. Susheela
4. "Govinda Govinda" — Raj Sitaram
5. "Mummy Mummy" — P. Susheela, Raj Sitaram
6. "Mammayya Mammayya" — P. Susheela, Raj Sitaram
7. "Neeve Chente" — P. Susheela, Raj Sitaram
