= Jeevana Jyothi (1988 film) =

- Title card
- Directed by: Relangi Narasimha Rao
- Written by: Satyanand (dialogues)
- Screenplay by: Relangi Narasimha Rao
- Story by: A. V. Mohan
- Produced by: D. Pratap Raju
- Starring: Sarath Babu; Jayasudha; Rajendra Prasad; Khushbu
- Cinematography: Sarath
- Edited by: K. Ravindra Babu
- Music by: Raj–Koti
- Production company: Nava Bharath Art Movies
- Release date: 26 October 1988
- Running time: 130 mins
- Country: India
- Language: Telugu

Jeevana Jyothi (transl. Joy of Life) is a 1988 Indian Telugu-language drama film, produced by D. Pratap Raju and directed by Relangi Narasimha Rao. It stars Sarath Babu, Jayasudha, Rajendra Prasad and Khushbu, with music composed by Raj–Koti. The film was a remake of Tamil film Thaali Dhaanam.

== Cast ==
- Sarath Babu as Sridhar
- Jayasudha as Kalyani
- Rajendra Prasad as Akbar
- Khushbu as Noorjahan
- Rallapalli as Abdulla Ali Khan
- Narra Venkateswara Rao
- Potti Prasad
- K. K. Sharma
- Juttu Narasimham as Ali
- Mano Chitra as Nirmala
- Jhansi
- Jaya Vijaya as Durgamma
- Dubbing Janaki
- Nirmalamma

== Soundtrack ==
Jeevana Jyothi

Film score by Raj–Koti
- Released: 1988
- Genre: Soundtrack
- Length: 19:22
- Label: Cauvery Audio
- Producer: Raj–Koti

Raj–Koti chronology
Thodallullu (1988)	Jeevana Jyothi (1988)	Sahasam Cheyara Dimbhaka (1988)

Music composed by Raj–Koti. Music released on Cauvery Audio Company.

S. No.	Song title	Lyrics	Singers	length
1	"Samsara Jeevitham"	Veturi	Mano, S. Janaki	4:03
2	"Muddoche Bulbul Pita"	Jonnavithhula	Mano, S. Janaki	3:42
3	"O Vayyari"	Veturi	S. P. Balasubrahmanyam, S. Janaki	3:43
4	"Guvva Guvva Jagratha"	C. Narayana Reddy	S. P. Balasubrahmanyam	4:00
5	"Neeve Namma Jyothi"	Veturi	K. J. Yesudas	3:54

== Awards ==
Nandi Awards - 1988

- Best Male Comedian - Rallapalli
- Best Male Playback Singer - K. J. Yesudas for "Neeve Namma Jyothi"
