= Preminchi Choodu (1989 film) =

- Directed by: Trivuraneni Varaprasad
- Written by: Sivsai Reddy A (dialogues)
- Screenplay by: Trivuraneni Varaprasad
- Story by: Aadi Vishnu; Pusala (main story)
- Produced by: Silk Smitha
- Starring: Rajendra Prasad; Chandra Mohan; Silk Smitha
- Narrated by: Jandhyala
- Cinematography: N. S. Raju
- Edited by: Gautham Raju
- Music by: Raj–Koti
- Production company: Essar Cine Enterprises
- Release date: 9 March 1989
- Running time: 132 mins
- Country: India
- Language: Telugu

Preminchi Choodu (transl. Love someone then See) is a 1989 Telugu-language comedy film, produced by Silk Smitha under the Essar Cine Enterprises banner and directed by Trivuraneni Varaprasad. It stars Rajendra Prasad, Chandra Mohan, Silk Smitha with music composed by Raj–Koti.

== Cast ==
- Rajendra Prasad as Chitti Babu
- Chandra Mohan as Mohan
- Silk Smitha as Satyabhama
- Kaikala Satyanarayana as Lord Brahma
- Suthi Veerabhadra Rao as Sastry
- Nutan Prasad as David Gopal Rao
- Kota Srinivasa Rao as Akkineni Bala Chandra aka A B C Chowdary
- Sakshi Ranga Rao
- Mada as Venkatapaiah
- Dr. Siva Prasad as Anjaneyulu
- Chitti Babu
- Ali
- Poornima as Jyothi
- Sri Lakshmi
- Radha Kumari
- Kakinada Shyamala as Annapurna
- Potti Prasad as Sanyasi
- Y. Vijaya as Mary

== Soundtrack ==
Preminchi Choodu

Film score by Raj–Koti
- Released: 1989
- Genre: Soundtrack
- Length: 21:45
- Label: LEO Audio
- Producer: Raj–Koti

Raj–Koti chronology
Jayammu Nischayammu Raa (1989)	Preminchi Choodu (1989)	Bhale Dampathulu (1989)

Music composed by Raj–Koti. Music released on LEO Audio Company.

S. No.	Song title	Lyrics	Singers	length
1	"Ugaali Gaali Uyyala"	Sirivennela Sitarama Sastry	Mano, Chitra	4:29
2	"Lechiraa Bava"	Jonnavithhula	Lalitha Sagari	3:15
3	"Aakasadesana"	Jonnavithhula	Mano	4:45
4	"Kokilamma"	Jaladi	Mano, S. P. Sailaja	4:49
5	"Raja Raja"	Jonnavithhula	Mano, Chitra	4:17
