= Rajakeeya Chadarangam =

- Theatrical release poster
- Directed by: P. Chandrasekhara Reddy
- Written by: Tripuraneni Maharadhi (dialogues)
- Screenplay by: P. Chandrasekhara Reddy
- Story by: S. N. Swamy
- Based on: The Day of the Jackal by Frederick Forsyth; August 1 by S. N. Swamy
- Produced by: G. Adiseshagiri Rao; G. Hanumantha Rao; Krishna (Presents)
- Starring: Akkineni Nageswara Rao; Krishna; Sujatha
- Cinematography: Lakshman Gore
- Edited by: Nageswara Rao, Satyanarayana
- Music by: Raj–Koti
- Production company: Padmalaya Studios
- Release date: 14 January 1989
- Running time: 120 minutes
- Country: India
- Language: Telugu

Rajakeeya Chadarangam (transl. Political Chess) is a 1989 Telugu-language action film, produced by G. Hanumantha Rao, G. Adiseshagiri Rao under the Padmalaya Studios banner, presented by Krishna and directed by P. Chandrasekhara Reddy. It stars Akkineni Nageswara Rao, Krishna and Sujatha, with music composed by Raj–Koti. The film was a remake of the Malayalam film August 1 (1988), itself loosely based on the 1971 Frederick Forsyth novel The Day of the Jackal.

== Cast ==
- Akkineni Nageswara Rao as Chief Minister Satya Murthy
- Krishna as S.P. Pratap IPS
- Sujatha as Savitri
- Charan Raj as Professional Killer Narang / Ranjeet Kumar
- Nagabhushanam as President Parandhamaiah
- Gummadi as I.G. Surendra Nath IPS
- Prabhakar Reddy as Contractor Papa Rao
- M. Balaiah as D.I.G.Gupta IPS
- Kota Srinivasa Rao as Joginadham
- Nutan Prasad as Thief
- Brahmanandam as Gopi
- Babu Mohan as M.L.A.
- Pradeep Shakthi as Jungle Jakka
- Tyagaraju as Dalal
- Vinod as Vinod
- Eshwara Rao as Journalist Gopal
- KK Sharma
- Ananth Babu
- Ram Mohan as M.L.A.
- Chidatala Appa Rao as Butler
- Jamuna as Governor
- Sangeeta as Principal
- Srilakshmi as Thief
- Priyanka
