= Santhi Nivasam (1986 film) =

1986 Telugu drama film by G. Ramamohana Rao

- Poster
- Directed by: Gullapalli Ram Mohana Rao
- Written by: Bheesetty; Satyanand; Gullapalli Ram Mohana Rao
- Produced by: Angara Satyam
- Starring: Krishna; Suhasini; Radhika Sarathkumar; Satyanarayana Kaikala
- Cinematography: V. S. R. Swamy
- Edited by: D. Venkataratnam
- Music by: Chakravarthy
- Production company: Rajalakshmi Movies
- Release date: 4 December 1986
- Country: India
- Language: Telugu

Santhi Nivasam (transl. Abode of Peace) is a 1986 Indian Telugu-language drama film produced by Angara Satyam for Rajalakshmi Movies, directed by Gullapalli Ram Mohan Rao starring Krishna, Suhasini, Radhika Sarathkumar and Kaikala Satyanarayana. Chakravarthi scored and composed the film's soundtrack. The film was declared a flop at the box office.

== Cast ==
- Krishna as Dr. Ravindra
- Suhasini as Lekha
- Radhika Sarathkumar as Lalitha
- Satyanarayana Kaikala
- Nutan Prasad
- Jayanthi as Lakshmi
- Kota Srinivasa Rao
- Banerjee
- Potti Prasad as Pellilla Perayya
- Mikkilineni as Raghupathi
- Sri Lakshmi as Sundari
- Sakshi Ranga Rao
- Sutti Veerabhadra Rao
- Vallam Narasimha Rao
- Kantha Rao(Guest) as Dr. Rao
- Gummadi(Guest)
- Anuradha

== Songs ==
Chakravarthi scored and composed the film's soundtrack with Veturi Sundararama Murthy writing the lyrics.

1. "Puvvula" -
2. "Podduna Gullo" -
3. "Tholinati Ratri" -
4. "Thummeda" -
5. "Chilakamma" -
