= Ashoka Chakravarthy =

- Theatrical Release Poster
- Directed by: S. S. Ravi Chandra
- Written by: Paruchuri Brothers (story / dialogues)
- Screenplay by: S. S. Ravi Chandra
- Produced by: Smt. Kaaja Venkataravamma
- Starring: Nandamuri Balakrishna; Bhanupriya; Bhagyasri
- Cinematography: Nandamuri Mohana Krishna
- Edited by: Kotagiri Venkateswara Rao
- Music by: Ilaiyaraaja
- Production company: Sri Venkateswara Art Productions.
- Release date: 29 June 1989
- Running time: 154 minutes
- Country: India
- Language: Telugu

Ashoka Chakravarthy is a 1989 Telugu-language action film produced by Smt. Kaaja Venkataravamma under the Sri Venkateswara Art Productions banner and directed by S. S. Ravi Chandra. It stars Nandamuri Balakrishna, Bhanupriya and music composed by Ilaiyaraaja. The film was a remake of the Mohanlal-starring Malayalam film Aryan with several changes to suit the audience.

== Plot ==
The film begins in Bombay, which is in jeopardy of a gang war between two dreadful Karim Saheb & Majid Khan. Vedam Venkata Ashok, a spirited man from an orthodox Brahmin family, endeavors to make a living but fails. However, he is acquainted with a sincere cop, ACP Robin Albert. A benevolent Muslim, Abdullah shelters him and turns his life around. Ashok is a priest at a temple in their village, "Krishnapuram." Vedam Venkataraya Sastry, his father, was bankrupted by the betrayal of his brother-in-law Shanmukha Sastry & Aadiseshaiah, and Ashok revolted against them. Moreover, Shanmukha Sastry begrudged as his daughter Urmila endears him. Accordingly, they conspire with a vile cop who incriminates Ashok for heisting the jewelry of Goddess and sentences him. Soon after release, Venkataraya Sastry ostracizes Ashok when he pledges to return with great riches.

Once, Ashok clashes with Majid Khan's men in rescuing a penniless. Since then, death has been behind him. Gazing at his caliber, Karim Saheb allows him to enroll in his syndicate. As it is inevitable, Ashok sets foot into the netherworld as a white knight who succeeds in several dangerous operations and destroys the Majid Khan dynasty. He sends all his earnings to Urmila to hand over his sly brother-in-law Krishna Murthy, who swindles it. Presently, Ashok summits as a kingpin who envies a sidekick, Kishtaiah, & Preeti, one that fascinates Ashok, whom he rejects. Urmila flees to avoid forcible knit and reaches Bombay when ACP Robin secures her. Karim's son Salim loves Abdullah's daughter Anarkali, which infuriates Karim Saheb and warns Abdullah. Here, Ashok's counterstrikes make him realize the eminence of love and decide to ban the lovers.

Meanwhile, Robin unites Ashok & Urmila through her. He knows that his family has dropped into poverty. So, Ashok moves to his hometown, where Venkataraya Sastry still hinders his entrance. Then, he challenges to prove himself as non-guilty by "Vijayadashami." In Bombay, Kishtaiah & Preeti mingle with Majid Khan and backstab Karim Saab when Robin seizes him. Immediately runs back, tactically acquits Karim Saheb, and performs the wedding of Salim & Anarkali. On that eve, Majid Khan onslaughts, in which Karim Saheb dies when Ashok strikes back, absconds from Bombay and lands at Krishnapuram. Now, he grabs knaves, recoups the temple jewelry, and is exonerated. Therefore, Venkataraya Sastry requests Ashok to partake in the family, which he politely rejects as he is ineligible to be with them. At last, Majid Khan assaults, and Robin also proceeds to apprehend the two. Finally, the movie ends with Ashok ceasing the baddies and surrendering to the Police.

== Cast ==
- Nandamuri Balakrishna as Ashok
- Bhanupriya as Urmila
- Satyanarayana as Karim Saheb
- Gollapudi Maruti Rao as Shanmukha Shastri
- Sharat Saxena as Majid Khan
- Pradeep Shakthi as Police Inspector
- Ranganath as ACP Rohin Albert
- Subhalekha Sudhakar as Johnson
- Harish as Salim
- J. V. Somayajulu
- P. L. Narayana as Abdullah
- Narra Venkateswara Rao as Aadi Sheshaiah
- Chalapathi Rao as Krishniah
- Vankayala Satyanarayana as Subba Rao
- Eeswar Rao as Krishna Moorti
- Tata Appa Rao as Shipward head
- Vijaya Rangaraju as Goon
- Suparna Anand as Preeti
- Bhagyasri as Anarkali
- Anjali Devi as Meenakshi
- Tatineni Rajeswari as Alivelu
- Jyothi as Rukmini
- Indira as Gayatri

== Soundtrack ==
Ashoka Chakravarthy

Film score by Ilaiyaraaja
- Released: 1989
- Genre: Soundtrack
- Length: 23:50
- Label: Echo Audio
- Producer: Ilaiyaraaja

Ilaiyaraaja chronology
| Rudranetra (1989) | Ashoka Chakravarthy (1989) | Prema (1989) |

Music composed by Ilaiyaraaja. Lyrics written by Veturi. Music released on Echo Audio Company.

| No. | Title | Singer(s) | Length |
|---|---|---|---|
| 1. | "Endaro Mahanubhavulu" | S. P. Balasubrahmanyam, S. Janaki | 5:06 |
| 2. | "Abba Rupamentha" | S. P. Balasubrahmanyam, Chitra | 4:33 |
| 3. | "Limmericku" | S. P. Balasubrahmanyam, Chitra | 4:33 |
| 4. | "Suvvi Suvvi" | S. P. Balasubrahmanyam, Chitra | 4:35 |
| 5. | "Jhanak Jhanak" | S. P. Balasubrahmanyam, S. Janaki | 4:28 |
| 6. | "Dharmala Logililo" | Ilaiyaraaja | 0:35 |
| Total length: | | | 23:15 |
