= Choopulu Kalasina Subhavela =

1988 film

- Directed by: Jandhyala
- Written by: Jandhyala (dialogues)
- Screenplay by: Jandhyala
- Story by: Adivishnu
- Produced by: Koneru Radhakumari
- Starring: Naresh; Mohan; Ashwini; Gayatri
- Cinematography: P. Diwakar
- Edited by: Gautam Raju
- Music by: Rajan–Nagendra
- Production company: Santosh Films
- Release date: 7 October 1988
- Country: India
- Language: Telugu

Choopulu Kalasina Subhavela is a 1988 Telugu-language romantic comedy film directed by Jandhyala starring Naresh, Mohan, Ashwini and Gayatri. The music was composed by Rajan–Nagendra.

== Plot ==
Anand Mohan works as a manager in a wall clock company owned by Pandurangam. Padma, daughter of Pandurangam's brother Nagalingam stays in his house and goes to college. Anand falls in love with her. But he is afraid to reveal it to Pandurangam because of the fear of losing his job.

Anand receives a letter from his friend Lakshmi Prasad. The letter explains his problems because of losses in his business. Anand goes to the village and rescues him as he is about to kill himself. He brings him to the town in hope of finding a job. Anand uses Lakshmi Prasad in various ways to convince Pandurangam of his love with Padma. At last Pandurangam realises their love and agrees to their proposal.

Lakshmi Prasad also loved a girl when he was in his village. He loses track of her when her family has migrated to some other city. Luckily, Lakshmi Prasad finds her again. Nagalingam does not like the word "Love". So he opposes it when his daughter proposes to marry Anand. This leads to conflict between the brothers and they split their property including their mother. She feels bad about this. When she decided to live in a temple instead of witnessing the fight of her two sons, Anand's father takes her to his home. He advises his son to reunite their family because they split because of his love.

Anand along with Padma, Lakshmi Prasad and others enact a story to change the minds of Nagalingam, who finally agrees to marry his daughter to Anand, and their family reunites.

== Cast ==
- Naresh as Prasad
- Mohan as Anand Mohan
- Ashwini as Padma
- Gayatri as Lalitha
- Nutan Prasad as Nagalingam
- Suthi Veerabhadra Rao as Pandurangam (voice dubbed by Jandhyala)
- Kota Srinivasa Rao as Gurunatham
- Suthi Velu
- Brahmanandam as Personal assistant of Pandurangam, a foodie
- Sri Lakshmi
- Ratna Sagar
- Radha Kumari
- Vidyasagar
- Ashok Rao
- Jenny
- Lakshmipati

== Awards ==
- Nandi Award for Best Art Director - Ramana
