= Sahasam Cheyara Dimbhaka =

- Directed by: Relangi Narasimha Rao
- Written by: Diwakar Babu (dialogues)
- Screenplay by: Relangi Narasimha Rao
- Story by: P. Sekhar
- Produced by: KVS Raju
- Starring: Rajendra Prasad; Kalpana
- Cinematography: B. Koteswara Rao
- Edited by: K. Balu
- Music by: Raj–Koti
- Production company: Suchitra Movies
- Release date: 1988
- Running time: 146 mins
- Country: India
- Language: Telugu

Sahasam Cheyara Dimbhaka (transl. Show some courage, man!) is a 1988 Telugu-language comedy film, produced by KVS Raju under the Suchitra Movies banner and directed by Relangi Narasimha Rao. It stars Rajendra Prasad and Kalpana, with music composed by Raj–Koti. The film was recorded as a flop at the box office.

== Cast ==
- Rajendra Prasad as Chandram
- Kalpana as Saroja
- Kota Srinivasa Rao as Harmonium Hanumantha Rao
- Suthi Veerabhadra Rao as Pond
- Suthi Velu as Gomukham
- Raavi Kondala Rao as Chidambaram
- Vidya Sagar as Inspector
- Eswara Rao as Chidambaram's brother-in-law
- Srilakshmi as Pond's assistant
- Rajitha as Rita
- Chilakala Radha as Haigamana

== Soundtrack ==
Sahasam Cheyara Dimbhaka

Film score by Raj–Koti
- Released: 1988
- Genre: Soundtrack
- Label: LEO Audio
- Producer: Raj–Koti

Raj–Koti chronology
Jeevana Jyothi (1988)	Sahasam Cheyara Dimbhaka (1988)	Doragaarintlo Dongodu (1988)

Music composed by Raj–Koti. Music released on LEO Audio Company.

S. No.	Song title	Lyrics	Singers	length
1	"Dammada Naa"	Veturi	S. P. Balasubrahmanyam, S. Janaki	
2	"Merise Nee Roopam"	C. Narayana Reddy	S. P. Balasubrahmanyam, S. Janaki	
3	"Musalode Muddu"	Veturi	S. P. Balasubrahmanyam, S. Janaki	
4	"Marodamu Anandam"	Veturi	Anitha Reddy	
5	"Neeku Naaku"	Acharya Aatreya	S. P. Balasubrahmanyam, S. Janaki	
