= Suthi Veerabhadra Rao =

Indian actor (1947–1988)

- Born: Mamidipalli Veerabhadra Rao; 6 June 1947; East Godavari, Andhra Pradesh, India
- Died: 30 June 1988 (aged 41); Chennai, India
- Other name: Bhadrudu
- Occupations: Actor; theatre artist; radio artist
- Spouse: Sekhari

Mamidipalli Veerabhadra Rao (1947–1988), commonly known as Suthi Veerabhadra Rao, was an Indian actor known for his comic and character roles in Telugu cinema. He was also a radio and theatre artist.

== Early life ==
Veerabhadra Rao was the only son, and had two younger sisters. He hailed from the East Godavari District (born at Ayanapuram) of Andhra Pradesh, and moved to Vijayawada due to his father's job. He did his schooling in 'AKTP school' and graduated from Andhra University, through 'SRR College', Vijayawada.

== Career ==
Suthi Veerabhadra Rao was one half of the famous "Sutti Janta", the other being Velu. He was a popular Radio and Theater Artist from 1970–1980. He entered the film industry in 1981, and became popular with Naalugu Sthambaalata in 1982. Until his untimely death due to heart attack, at the age of 41, he acted in 200+ films.

=== Radio and theatre career ===
Veerabhadra Rao was interested in acting right from his childhood, he used to act in stage plays at school level. During his graduation days at SRR College, Vijayawada, he teamed with Jandhyala who was his classmate, and together, they participated in many competitions at university level. This team went on to become one of the hit teams in film industry with respect to comedy.

After Graduation, with love for theatre, he went on to become an employee of All India Radio (AIR), Vijayawada. While working there, he had staged many plays in Thummalapalli Kalakshetram, and Veledandla Hanumantharaya Grandhalayam, Vijayawada. He also participated in many plays that were broadcast from AIR. During his tenure with AIR, VJA, he worked with stalwarts of Telugu Theater and literature, like CSR Anajaneyulu, Vinnakota Ramanna Panthulu, Nanduri Subba Rao, C Rama Mohan Rao, Usha Sri, Vinnakota Vijayaram, Indrakanti Sreekanth Sarma, P Pandurangarao (Panduringa), Peri Kameswara Rao, Koka Sanjeeva Rao, A B Anand etc. Sri Balatranpu RajaniKantha Rao (Rajani) is instrumental for his entry into AIR. Sri Rajani would select his staff only if they could pronounce all the 56 letters of Telugu language, in a clear tone, with correct pronunciation and enunciation. His most popular stage play was Krishna Paksham presented at Konteru Nataka Parishath.

=== Film artist ===
He entered the Telugu film industry in 1981, with the film Jatara. However, he got noticed in the industry in 1982, through the film Naalugu Sthambaalata by Jandhayla. He became famous in Tollywood for his lengthy dialogues. From 1982 to 1988, he acted in over 200 films. During this period, he played different kinds of roles.

He was the main character in many of the earlier films of Naresh and Rajendra Prasad. He was approached by few producers and directors for a guest role, with the belief that his presence would make the film a hit. As a result, there are many films where he is seen, sometimes, even without credits. During his short tenure, he acted with most of the heroes of his time. At the time of his death in 1988, he completed the shooting for the film Choopulu Kalisina Subhavela, but, the voice dubbing remained. Jandhyala gave his voice for the character.

== Personal life ==
Veerabhadra Rao married Sekhari in 1970 and has two children, a son and a daughter. His daughter died in 2013 from cancer.

He was an avid reader of Literature in Telugu and English. He had his own personal library consisting of some of the books such as Veyi Padagalu and Srimad Bhagavatham. He also had a big collection of plays written in Telugu.

He used to donate huge amounts of money for the needy, and there were many beneficiaries from him. He led a simple life, helping others, and doing what he liked to do. He was religious.

== Death ==
While shooting for a song in the film Choopulu Kalisina Subhavela, there was a sprain in one of his legs. Being a diabetic, he could not recover immediately and was advised to take some rest, as he was working continuously for a long time.

He was admitted in a hospital for recovery. On 30 June 1988, he died of a drug-induced heart attack.

== Filmography ==
Some of his popular films are:

List of Suthi Veerabhadra Rao film credits
Year	Title	Role	Notes
1974	Dorababu		
1974	Amma Manasu		
1975	Bharatamlo Oka Ammayi		
1978	Mallepoovu		
1980	Jathara		
1981	Erra Mallelu		
1981	Kondaveeti Simham		
1982	Nalugu Stambhalata		
1982	Kalahala Kapuram	Annavaram	
1982	Brahmaa Nee Raata Taarumaaru		
1982	Manishiko Charithra		
1983	Bezawada Bebbuli	Achari	
1983	Nelavanka	Avadhanlu	
1983	Palletoori Monagadu		
1983	Rendu Jella Seetha		
1983	Ramarajyamlo Bheemaraju		
1983	Durga Devi	Gowripathi	
1983	Puttadi Bomma	Meka / medhavi kavi	
1983	Ananda Bhairavi		
1983	Konte Kodallu		
1983	Mugguru Ammayila Mogudu	Tailor Subba Rao	
1983	Lanke Bindelu	Muthaiah	
1983	Moodu Mullu		
1984	Mayuri		
1984	Kanchu Kagada	Sadanandam	
1984	Rustum		
1984	Agni Gundam		
1984	Sundari Subbarao		
1984	Rama Rao Gopal Rao a.k.a. Rao Gopal Rao		
1984	Aparadhi		
1984	Eduruleni Monagallu	Singareni Simhachalam	
1984	Merupu Daadi	Owner of Fool&Son Guns Shop	
1984	Goonda		
1984	Srivariki Premalekha		
1985	Babayi-Abbayi		
1985	Preminchi Pelladu		
1985	Chattamtho Poratam	Public Prosecutor	
1985	Mayadari Maridi		
1985	Sri Datta Darsanam		
1985	Musugu Donga	Bhadrayya, the drunkard	
1985	Chiranjeevi	Thirupathayya	
1985	Vande Mataram		
1985	Terror		
1985	Raktha Sindhuram	Doctor	
1985	Mogudu Pellalu		
1986	Rendu Rella Aaru	Airavatham	
1986	Maa Vari Gola		
1986	Dora Bidda		
1986	Challani Ramayya Chakkani Seethamma		
1986	Maruthi		
1986	Driver Babu	Dakshinamurthy	
1986	Swathi Muthyam		
1986	Chantabbai		
1986	Sravana Sandhya		
1986	Oka Radha Iddaru Krishnulu	Anjneelu	
1986	Sri Shirdi Saibaba Mahathyam	Bal Bhate	
1986	Chadastapu Mogudu		
1986	Santhi Nivasam		
1986	Poojaku Panikiraani Puvvu		
1986	Konte Kapuram		
1986	Jeevana Poratam		
1986	Padaharella Ammayi		
1987	Vijetha Vikram	S.P.Pithal	
1987	Rakshasa Samharam	Raghava	
1987	Gandhinagar Rendava Veedhi		
1987	Rowdy Police		
1987	Dabbevariki Chedu		
1987	Manmadha Leela Kamaraju Gola	Pandala Paramasivam	
1987	Paga Saadhista	Head Constable	
1987	Daada		
1987	Ajeyudu		
1987	Dammit Katha Addam Thirigindi		
1987	Saradhamba		
1987	Aha Naa Pellanta		
1987	Thene Manasulu	Madanagopal's father	
1987	Maavoori Magadu		
1987	Madana Gopaludu		
1988	Vivaha Bhojanambu		
1988	Sahasam Cheyara Dimbaka		
1988	Pelli Chesi Choodu		
1988	Station Master		
1988	Rowdy No.1	Meesala Venkatappaiah	
1988	Bandipotu	Minister	
1988	Nyayaniki Siksha	'Sayankalam' newspaper reporter	
1988	Choopulu Kalisina Shubhavela	Pandurangam	
1988	O Tandri Theerpu		
1988	Neeku Naku Pellanta		
1988	Collector Vijaya		
1988	Chikkadu Dorakadu		
1988	Chinni Krishnudu		
1989	Krishna Gari Abbayi		
1989	Preminchi Choodu		(final film role)
