= Two Town Rowdy =

- Theatrical release poster
- Directed by: Dasari Narayana Rao
- Written by: Dasari Narayana Rao (dialogues)
- Screenplay by: Dasari Narayana Rao
- Story by: N. Chandra
- Based on: Tezaab (1988)
- Produced by: C. Venkat Raju; B. Sivaraju
- Starring: Venkatesh; Radha; Krishnam Raju; Mohan Babu
- Cinematography: K. S. Hari
- Edited by: B. Krishanam Raju
- Music by: Raj–Koti
- Production company: Sri Vijaya Lakshmi Productions
- Release date: 29 December 1989
- Running time: 140 mins
- Country: India
- Language: Telugu

Two Town Rowdy is a 1989 Telugu-language action film produced by C. Venkat Raju and B. Sivaraju under the Sri Vijaya Lakshmi Productions banner and directed by Dasari Narayana Rao. It stars Venkatesh and Radha, with music composed by Raj–Koti. It is a remake of the Hindi film Tezaab. The film was average' at the box-office.

== Plot ==
Inspector Ranjith Kumar (Krishnam Raju) gets a tip about an infamous exiled criminal Shakthi (Venkatesh), entering his jurisdiction, so he checks Shakthi's file. Ranjith Kumar is shocked to find that Shakthi is none other than NCC Cadet, an aspiring officer, whom he had met years ago in a bank. In front of the eyes of Ranjith Kumar and Shakthi, a robbery took place, and Shakthi's parents were killed. Ranjith Kumar never got to know what happened to Shakthi. Nevertheless, Ranjith Kumar tracks down Shakthi and asks him to surrender. Shakthi tells him that he has to save his love Padmini / Puppy (Radha) from the clutches of dreaded gangster Baba Sab (Mohan Babu).

Then, he reveals the past, after the death of his parents, he shifted to Madras with his sister Jyothi (Sudha Rani. He met a girl named Padmini / Puppy and fell in love with her. Puppy's father, Appa Rao (Pradeep Shakthi), didn't like this relationship. Appa Rao was a drunkard who mooched off the money earned by his dancer wife. When she finally stood up to him, Appa Rao burned her face with sulphuric acid. She died soon afterwards, following which Appa Rao forced Puppy to follow in her mother's steps. Appa Rao has taken a loan from Baba Sab, and the only way to repay it is to make Puppy dance. But Puppy does not give up and continues meeting Shakthi. Appa Rao meets the younger brother of Baba Sab (Ahuti Prasad), who joined him after completing his term for robbery, and he was arrested due to Shakthi. Baba Sab doesn't know Shakthi's identity. Appa Rao instantly recognizes Shakthi and explains everything to Baba Sab. Chote goes to Shakthi's house and tries to rape Jyothi as revenge. Shakthi averts this and kills Chotu. Shakthi is arrested and sentenced to one year in jail, after which he becomes Shakthi and gets exiled. After serving his sentence, Shakthi starts destroying Baba Sab's empire with the help of his friends. As revenge, Baba Sab kidnaps Puppy. Appa Rao now deals with Shakthi to get Puppy rescued. Shakthi rescues her, but she is shocked to see that Shakthi is sending her back to her father. On learning the whole story from Shakthi, Ranjith Kumar allows him to complete his task. After saving Puppy, Shakthi surrenders unconditionally to Ranjith Kumar, whereupon he gets arrested and sent to prison. After a retrial, Shakthi is acquitted of his charges and plans to start a new life at Goa. However, Jyoti convinces him to accept Puppy again. Naresh (Naresh) reaches Puppy's home and explains Shakthi's actions to her. Appa Rao is enraged and tries to stop Puppy from leaving and tries to throw acid on her face, but accidentally he only dies. Puppy meets Shakthi again.

However, Baba Sab, learning of Shakthi's acquittal, conspires to kill him at a dockyard. Naresh gets the tip of Baba Sab's conspiracy and challenges Baba Sab. Baba Sab gets enraged, and a fight between him and Naresh ends in Baba Sab getting defeated. Naresh wants to kill Baba Sab in a fit of rage, but Shakthi intercepts him and stops him from committing murder. Meanwhile, Baba Sab regains his strength and goes to attack Shakthi with a club. Naresh dies, deflecting the attack. Shakthi fought back Baba Sab and was about to kill him. But the Inspector Ranjith Kumar stops him from killing Baba Sab. In another attempt of Baba Sab trying to kill Shakthi, Inspector Ranjith Kumar kills Baba Sab with his service revolver, and the movie comes to an end.

== Cast ==
- Venkatesh as Shakthi
- Radha as Padmini / Puppy
- Krishnam Raju as Inspector Ranjeeth Kumar
- Mohan Babu as Baba Sab
- Naresh as Naresh
- Pradeep Shakthi as Appa Rao
- Chandra Mohan as Canteen singer
- Brahmanandam as Shakthi's friend
- Ahuti Prasad as Chota Sab
- Anand Raj as Goon
- Jaya Prakash Reddy as Inspector Prakash
- Sakshi Ranga Rao as Canteen owner
- Suthivelu as Marvadi
- Ramana Reddy as Shakthi's friend
- P. J. Sarma as Public Prosecutor
- Hema Sundar as Shakthi's father
- Telephone Satyanarayana as Judge
- Maganti Sudhakar as Navanitha Rao
- Srihari as Shakthi's friend
- Manjula as Padmini's mother
- Sudha Rani as Jyothi
- Reshma Singh as Preethi

== Soundtrack ==
Two Town Rowdy

Soundtrack album by Raj–Koti
- Released: 1989
- Genre: Soundtrack
- Length: 25:04
- Label: AMC Audio
- Producer: Raj–Koti

Raj–Koti chronology
Bhagawan (1989)	Two Town Rowdy (1989)	Koduku Didina Kapuram (1989)

The musical soundtrack was composed by Raj–Koti. The lyrics were written by Dasari Narayana Rao. The music was released on AMC Audio Company. The songs "One Two Three" and "Ding Dong Ding" were both remakes of the famous song "Ek Do Teen" from the original Hindi version.

No.	Title	Singer(s)	Length
1.	"One Two Three"	S. Janaki	6:33
2.	"Maa Ammayiki"	S. P. Balasubrahmanyam, S. Janaki	4:33
3.	"Mokkajonna Paththu"	S. P. Balasubrahmanyam, Chitra	4:39
4.	"Vaddura Niddara"	Mano, Jayachandra, s.janaki	4:37
5.	"Ding Dong Ding"	S. P. Balasubrahmanyam	4:42
Total length:			25:04
