= Vicky Daada =

1989 Telugu film by A. Kodandarami Reddy

- Theatrical poster
- Directed by: A. Kodandarami Reddy
- Screenplay by: Paruchuri Brothers
- Story by: Yandamuri Veerendranath
- Produced by: D. Sivaprasad Reddy
- Starring: Nagarjuna; Radha; Juhi Chawla
- Cinematography: N. Sudhakar Reddy
- Edited by: D. Venkataratnam
- Music by: Raj–Koti
- Production company: Kamakshi Art Movies
- Release date: 9 March 1989
- Running time: 140 minutes
- Country: India
- Language: Telugu

Vicky Daada is a 1989 Telugu-language film directed by A. Kodandarami Reddy. It stars Nagarjuna, Radha, and Juhi Chawla in lead roles with music composed by Raj–Koti. The film was dubbed into Hindi with the same title.

== Plot ==
Vikram is a graduate in law. He and Sravani are both in love with each other. She, one day, leaves town for a while and comes back to see Nagarjuna as a thug named Vicky Dada (his title role). Nagarjuna turned into a criminal because of the corruption in court. He is after the villains (led by Kannada Prabhakar). How he stops them and helps the poor forms the rest of the story.

== Cast ==
- Nagarjuna as Vikram
- Radha as Revathi
- Juhi Chawla as Sravani
- Kannada Prabhakar as Prabhakar
- Gollapudi Maruthi Rao as Amrutha Rao
- Giri Babu as Lawyer Giridhar Rao
- Ranganath as D.I.G. Ranganatha Rao
- Kota Srinivasa Rao as Inspector Kota
- Sudhakar as Amrutha Rao's younger son
- Prasad Babu as Amurtha Rao's elder son
- Vinod as Jaggu
- Vankayala as Vankayala Master
- Bhimeswara Rao as Principal
- Srividya as Justice Srividya
- Vara Lakshmi as Rekha
- Kalpana Rai

== Music ==
Music for the film was composed by Raj–Koti and lyrics were written by Veturi. Audio soundtrack was released on AMC audio label.

No.	Title	Singer(s)	Length
1.	"O Baby Neemeeda"	Mano, S. Janaki	4:23
2.	"Abba Takku Tikku"	S. P. Balasubrahmanyam, P. Susheela	4:07
3.	"Beauty Beauty"	S. P. Balasubrahmanyam, S. Janaki	4:57
4.	"Ganta Gantaki Motaguntadi"	S. P. Balasubrahmanyam, S. Janaki	4:27
5.	"Jarindammo Jarindammo"	S. P. Balasubrahmanyam, S. Janaki	4:01
Total length:			21:55
