= Raj–Koti =

- Origin: Andhra Pradesh
- Genres: Film score, World music
- Occupations: Film score composer, music director, singer
- Years active: 1982–1995

Thotakura Somaraju (c. 1954 – 21 May 2023) and Saluri Koteswara Rao, popularly known as Raj–Koti, were a duo of Indian film music composers, singer-songwriters, record producers, musicians and multi-instrumentalists in Telugu cinema. In a notable career spanning a decade, the duo garnered particular acclaim for redefining contemporary Telugu film music. They composed music for about 180 films. Out of their 3,000 songs, about 2,500 were sung by the singers S. P. Balasubrahmanyam, P. Susheela and K. S. Chithra.

The Raj–Koti duo was among the many prominent South Indian composers for whom A. R. Rahman has worked as a keyboard programmer for 8 years.

In a television interview aired on ABN Andhrajyothy, the duo announced that they were teaming up again in 2012 and reinstating the Raj–Koti brand.

== Background ==
Thotakura Somaraju (Raj) was the son of T. V. Raju. He died on 21 May 2023, at the age of 68.

Saluri Koteswara Rao (Koti) is the son of S. Rajeswara Rao.

== Awards ==
Nandi Awards

- Nandi Award for Best Music Director – 1994 – Hello Brother

== Discography ==
Raj–Koti

- Pralaya Garjana (1982)
- Bharya Bhartala Sawaal (1982)
- Udayam (1984)
- Ee Theerpu Illalidhi (1984)
- James Bond 999 (1984)
- Pralaya Simham (1984)
- Lady Jamesbond (1985)
- Punnami Rathri (1985)
- Digvijayam (1986)
- Love Master (1986)
- Pelli Kaani Illalu (1986)
- Naa Pilupe Prabhanjanam (1986)
- Mandaladeesudu (1987)
- Madana Gopaludu (1987)
- Sankharavam (1987)
- Paga Sadhista (1987)
- Rowdy Babai (1987)
- Doctorgari Abbai (1987)
- Samsaram (1988)
- Thodallullu (1988)
- Jeevana Jyothi (1988)
- Sahasam Cheyara Dimbhaka (1988)
- Doragaarintlo Dongodu (1988)
- Chikkadu Dorakadu (1988)
- Indradhanassu (1988)
- Prana Snehithulu (1988)
- Ukku Sankellu (1988)
- Veguchukka Pagatichukka (1988)
- Yamudiki Mogudu (1988)
- Khaidi No.786 (1988)
- Rowdy No.1 (1988)
- Bazaar Rowdy (1988)
- Trinetrudu (1988)
- Bandipotu (1988)
- Ugranethrudu (1988)
- Maharajasri Mayagaadu (1988)
- Lankeswarudu (1989)
- Sakshi (1989)
- Paape Maa Pranam (1989)
- Poola Rangadu (1989)
- Jayammu Nischayammu Raa (1989)
- Preminchi Choodu (1989)
- Adavilo Artharatri (1989)
- Palnati Rudraiah (1989)
- Black Tiger (1989)
- Bhale Dampathulu (1989)
- Bala Gopaludu (1989)
- Vicky Daada(1989)
- Rajakeeya Chadarangam (1989)
- Manchi Kutumbam (1989)
- Goonda Rajyam (1989)
- Pinni (1989)
- Bhagavan (1989)
- Two Town Rowdy (1989)
- Koduku Didina Kapuram (1989)
- Anna Thammudu (1990)
- Vishnu (1990)
- Judgement (1990)
- Mamasri (1990)
- Sila Sasanam (1990)
- Balachandrudu (1990)
- Irugillu Porugillu (1990)
- Papa Kosam (1990)
- Master Kapuram (1990)

Karthavyam (1990)

- Magaadu (1990)
- Aadadi (1990)
- Kondaveeti Rowdy (1990)
- Rao Gari Intlo Rowdy (1990)
- Qaidi Dada (1990)
- Indrajith (1990)
- Yama Dharma Raju (1990)
- Kodama Simham (1990)
- Raja Vikramarka (1990)
- Iddaru Iddare (1990)
- Sathruvu (1990)
- Bujjigadi Babai (1990)
- Stuvartpuram Dongalu (1991)
- Ramudu Kadhu Rakshasudu (1991)
- Super Express (1991)
- Parama Sivudu (1991)
- Pasidi Pantalu (1991)
- Mamagaaru (1991)
- Peddinti Alludu (1991)
- Siva Sakthi (1991)
- Pandirimancham (1991)
- Naa Pellam Naa Ishtam (1991)
- Nenera Police (1991)
- Aagraham (1991)
- Akka Mogudu (1992)
- Pranadaata (1992)
- Bangaru Mama (1992)
- Ahankari (1992)
- Rendu Pondatti Kaavalkaaran (1992; Tamil)
- Gang War (1992)
- Antham (1992)
- Pelli Neeku Subham Naaku (1992)
- Collector Gari Alludu (1992)
- College Bullodu (1992)
- Peddarikam (1992)
- Balaramakrishnulu (1992)
- Seetharatnam Gari Abbayi (1992)
- Alexander (1992)
- Attasommu Alludu Danam (1992)
- Snehada Kadalalli (1992; Kannada)
- Mogudu Pellala Dongaata (1992)
- Edurmaneli Ganda Pakkadmaneli Hendthi (1992; Kannada)
- Nagaradalli Nayakaru (1992; Kannada)
- Public Rowdy (1992)
- Rayaru Bandaru Mavana Manege (1993; Kannada)
- Inspector Jhansi(1993)
- Bava Bavamaridi (1993)
- Dongalludu (1993)
- Muta Mestri (1993)
- Jambalakidi Pamba (1993)
- Bangaru Bullodu (1993)
- Mechanic Alludu (1993)
- Ish Ghup Chup (1993)
- Nakshatra Poratam (1993)
- Paruvu Pratishta (1993)
- Nippu Ravva (1993)
- Evandi Avida Vachchindi (1993)
- Pelli Gola (1993)
- Rajadhani (1993)
- Ish Gup Chup (1993)
- Pekata Papa Rao (1993)
- Aasayam (1993)
- Parugo Parugu (1994)
- Doragaariki Donga Pellam (1994)
- Mayadari Mosagadu (1994)
- Alludu Poru Ammayi Joru (1994)
- Maa Voori Maaraju (1994)
- Govinda Govinda (1994)
- Kiladigalu (1994; Kannada)
- Hello Brother (1994)
- Bhale Mavayya (1994)
- Jailor Gari Abbai(1994)
- Andaroo! Andare!! (1994)
- Bangaru Kutumbam(1994)
- Todi Kodallu (1994)
- Maga Rayudu (1994)
- Srivari Priyuralu (1994)
- Atha Kodalu (1994)
- Maa Voori Maaraju (1994)
- Hello Alludu (1994)
- Jeevana Khaidi (1994)
- M. Dharmaraju M.A. (1994)
- Tapassu (1995)
- Raja Simham (1995)
- Pokiri Raja (1995)
- Leader (1995)
- Aasti Mooredu Aasa Baaredu (1995)
- God Father (1995)
- Hogi Pyaar Ki Jeet (1999) (Hindi; score only)

Raj's Solo career filmography

- Sisindri (1995)
- Bharatha Simham (1995)
- Ramudochadu (1996)
- Mrugam (1996)
- Bobbili Bullodu (1996)
- Panjaram (1997)
- Sambhavam (1998)
- Premante Idera (1998) (BGM)
- Chinni Chinni Aasa (1999)
- Prema Kosam (1999)
- Surya Putrika (1999)
- Lagna Patrika (2002)
