= Jayammu Nischayammu Raa (1989 film) =

- Theatrical release poster
- Directed by: Jandhyala
- Screenplay by: Jandhyala
- Story by: Aadi Vishnu
- Produced by: G. V. H. Prasad; Satyanarayana; Kota Srinivasa Rao (Presents)
- Starring: Rajendra Prasad; Sumalatha; Chandra Mohan
- Cinematography: Babji
- Edited by: Gautam Raju
- Music by: Raj–Koti
- Production company: Sudarshana Pictures
- Release date: 6 July 1989
- Running time: 143 mins
- Country: India
- Language: Telugu

Jayammu Nischayammu Raa (transl. 'Victory is certain') is 1989 Indian Telugu-language comedy film directed by Jandhyala and produced by G. V. H. Prasad under the Sudarshana Pictures banner. The film was presented by Kaikala Satyanarayana and Kota Srinivasa Rao. It stars Rajendra Prasad, Sumalatha and Chandra Mohan, with music composed by Raj–Koti. The film's title is taken from a popular song in the film Sabhash Ramudu (1959). It marked the film debut of comedian Dharmavarapu Subramanyam. Jayammu Nischayammu Raa was a commercial success and was later remade in Tamil as Killadi Mappillai (1994).

== Plot ==
The film begins with two best friends, Rambabu and Suribabu, who are tenants in the house of Gopalam, a hound playing instruments, and his wife Kantham, who pesters by hugging everyone who remembers their deceased son Chitti. Rambabu gets acquainted with Shanti and falls for her. Simultaneously, Suribabu loves a girl, Seeta, who suffers from family dysfunction. Suribabu works to tackle the problem, which never ends. After completing her studies, Shanti returns to her village. Rambabu and Suribabu fail to detect her and return to their hometowns. Here, Suribabu notices Shanti as his neighbor and informs Rambabu. Rambabu's father, Ranganatham fixes his alliance with his best friend Jaganatham's daughter, i.e. Shanti only. Being incognizant of it, Rambabu refuses the match and challenges his father to succeed in his love within six months. Rambabu lands at Suribabu's village and proposes to Shanti, which she denies as she loathes the love and affirms an arranged marriage.

Rambabu decides to inspire her parents when he learns Jaganatham is a martinet atheist, and his wife Subbalakshmi is an adherent devotee. Rambabu engraves in both ways. Soon after, he discovers Jaganatham's assumption that he must like his parents too. Thus, Rambabu concocts Gopalam and Kantham as his parents and gets in. Thereupon, Rambabu confronts Shanti to couple up her with elders' acceptance. Accordingly, she aims to bring out his reality. After a few comic incidents, a clash arises between Jaganatham and Ranganatham, and they call off the match. Jaganatham decides to perform Shanti's espousal with Rambabu. Before, he tests his character with the help of Chakrapani. Shanti understands Rambabu's virtue. As a closing, Jaganatham announces Shanti's nuptials with Chakrapani, to which Rambabu agrees. Exploiting it, Chakrapani's swindler father, Narayana prints the wedding cards. During that plight, Rambabu makes a play and teaches a lesson to Narayana. Eventually, Jaganatham realizes Rambabu is Ranganatham's son, and they reunite. Finally, the movie ends on a happy note with the marriage of Rambabu and Shanti.

== Cast ==
- Rajendra Prasad as Rambabu
- Sumalatha as Shanthi
- Chandra Mohan as Suribabu
- Satyanarayana as Narayana
- Kota Srinivasa Rao as Patil
- Brahmanandam as Gopalam
- Suthi Velu as Jaganatham
- Dharmavarapu Subramanyam as Ranganatham
- Ashok Kumar as Chakrapani
- Telephone Satyanarayana as Murthy
- Satti Babu as Gruhaspathi
- Srilakshmi as Kantham
- Avanthi as Seetha
- Radha Kumari as Subbalakshmi

=== Special appearances ===
- Krishna as himself
- Venkatesh as himself
- Suman as himself
- Ramesh Babu
- Hema

== Soundtrack ==
Jayammu Nischayammu Raa

Film score by Raj–Koti
- Released: 1989
- Genre: Soundtrack
- Length: 20:22
- Label: AMC Audio
- Producer: Raj–Koti

Raj–Koti chronology
Bhale Dampathulu (1989)	Jayammu Nischayammu Raa (1989)	Black Tiger (1989)

Music composed by Raj–Koti. Music released on AMC Audio Company.

S. No.	Song title	Lyrics	Singers	length
1	"Abhimathamo Abhinayamo"	Sirivennela Sitarama Sastry	S. P. Balasubrahmanyam, P. Susheela	3:59
2	"Nee Manase Mahashakthi Raa"	Jonnavithhula Ramalingeswara Rao	S. P. Balasubrahmanyam	4:22
3	"O Chilaka"	Mallapudi Sastry	S. P. Balasubrahmanyam, Chitra	3:34
4	"Ayyayyayyo Rama"	Jonnavithhula Ramalingeswara Rao	S. P. Sailaja	4:00
5	"Jayammu Nischayammura"	Jonnavithhula Ramalingeswara Rao	S. P. Balasubrahmanyam, Chitra	4:27

== Other ==
- VCDs and DVDs on - Sri Ganesh Video Company, Bangalore
