= Chikkadu Dorakadu (1988 film) =

- DVD cover
- Directed by: Relangi Narasimha Rao
- Written by: Satyanand (story / dialogues)
- Screenplay by: Relangi Narasimha Rao
- Produced by: S. P. Venkanna Babu
- Starring: Rajendra Prasad; Rajani
- Cinematography: Sarath
- Edited by: D. Raja Gopal
- Music by: Raj–Koti
- Production company: Maheswari Movies
- Release date: 1988
- Running time: 144 mins
- Country: India
- Language: Telugu

Chikkadu Dorakadu is a 1988 Telugu-language action film, produced by S. P. Venkanna Babu for Maheswari Movies and directed by Relangi Narasimha Rao. It stars Rajendra Prasad, Rajani with music composed by Raj–Koti.

== Cast ==
- Rajendra Prasad as Raja & Chinnababu Dileep (Dual Role)
- Rajani as Rani / Seeta Devi
- Satyanarayana as Peddodu Satyam
- Gollapudi Maruti Rao as Principal Krishna Paramatma
- Giri Babu as Chinnodu Sivam
- Ranganath as S. I. Rama Rao
- Suthi Veerabhadra Rao as Head Constable
- Suthi Velu as Dumbu
- Allu Ramalingaiah as Teacher
- Brahmanandam as Bullodu Sundaram
- Chidatala Appa Rao as Thief
- Satti Babu as Thief
- Madan Mohan as Lawyer Tikamaka Rao
- Malladi as Judge
- Manjula as Gayatri Devi
- Jyothi as Sumitra
- Maya as Kasulamma

== Soundtrack ==
Chikkadu Dorakadu

Film score by Raj–Koti
- Released: 1988
- Genre: Soundtrack
- Length: 21:08
- Label: LEO Audio
- Producer: Raj–Koti

Raj–Koti chronology
Doragaarintlo Dongodu (1988)	Chikkadu Dorakadu (1988)	Indradhanassu (1988)

Music composed by Raj–Koti. Lyrics were written by Veturi. Music released on LEO Audio Company.

S.No	Song title	Singers	length
1	"Chaline Nammukundama "	S. P. Balasubrahmanyam, S. Janaki	4:21
2	"Sayankalam Andagathe Odi Sai"	S. P. Balasubrahmanyam, S. Janaki	4:04
3	"Orabbi Nee Kattera Debbaku"	S. P. Balasubrahmanyam, S. Janaki	4:31
4	"Ethu Ethu Ethu Veyi Janmalethu"	S. P. Balasubrahmanyam, S. Janaki	3:49
5	"Vinave Bala Naa Prema Gola"	S. P. Balasubrahmanyam	4:23
