= Rowdy No.1 =

1988 Telugu action film by S. S. Ravichandra

- Theatrical release poster
- Directed by: S. S. Ravichandra
- Written by: Paruchuri Brothers (Dialogues)
- Produced by: K. V. V. Satyanarayana
- Starring: Krishna; Radha; Sarada
- Cinematography: Mahidhar
- Edited by: Kotagiri Venkateswara Rao
- Music by: Raj–Koti
- Production company: Sri Sowdamini Creations
- Release date: 16 June 1988
- Country: India
- Language: Telugu

Rowdy No.1 is a 1988 Indian Telugu-language action film directed by S. S. Ravichandra, produced by K. V. V. Satyanarayana for Sri Sowdamini Creations. The film stars Krishna, Radha, Sarada, and Kaikala Satyanarayana with musical score by Raj–Koti duo. The film turned out to be a successful venture.

== Cast ==
- Krishna as Bhagawan
- Radha as Sandhya
- Sarada as S.P. Sharvani
- Kaikala Satyanarayana as S. Sivalingeswara Rao
- Nutan Prasad as Tiger Nagaraju
- Gollapudi Maruti Rao as Kongajapam Koteswara Rao
- Sutti Veerabhadra Rao as Meesala Venkatappaiah
- Jayamalini as Meesala Venkatappaiah's wife
- Sakshi Ranga Rao as Avadhani
- Narra Venkateswara Rao as Sub-Inspector of Police
- P.J. Sarma as Judge
- Tyagaraju as I.G. Prabhakar Rao
- K.K. Sarma as Constable

== Music ==
Raj–Koti duo scored and composed the film's soundtrack.

- "Andamaina Adapilla" — S.P.B., S. Janaki
- "Jai Bolo" — S.P.B., K. S. Chithra
- "Sogase Unnadanni" — S. Janaki
- "Yendayyo" — S.P.B., S. Janaki
- "Yenduko Cheema" — S. Janaki, S.P.B.
