= Kota Srinivasa Rao =

Indian Telugu actor (1942–2025)

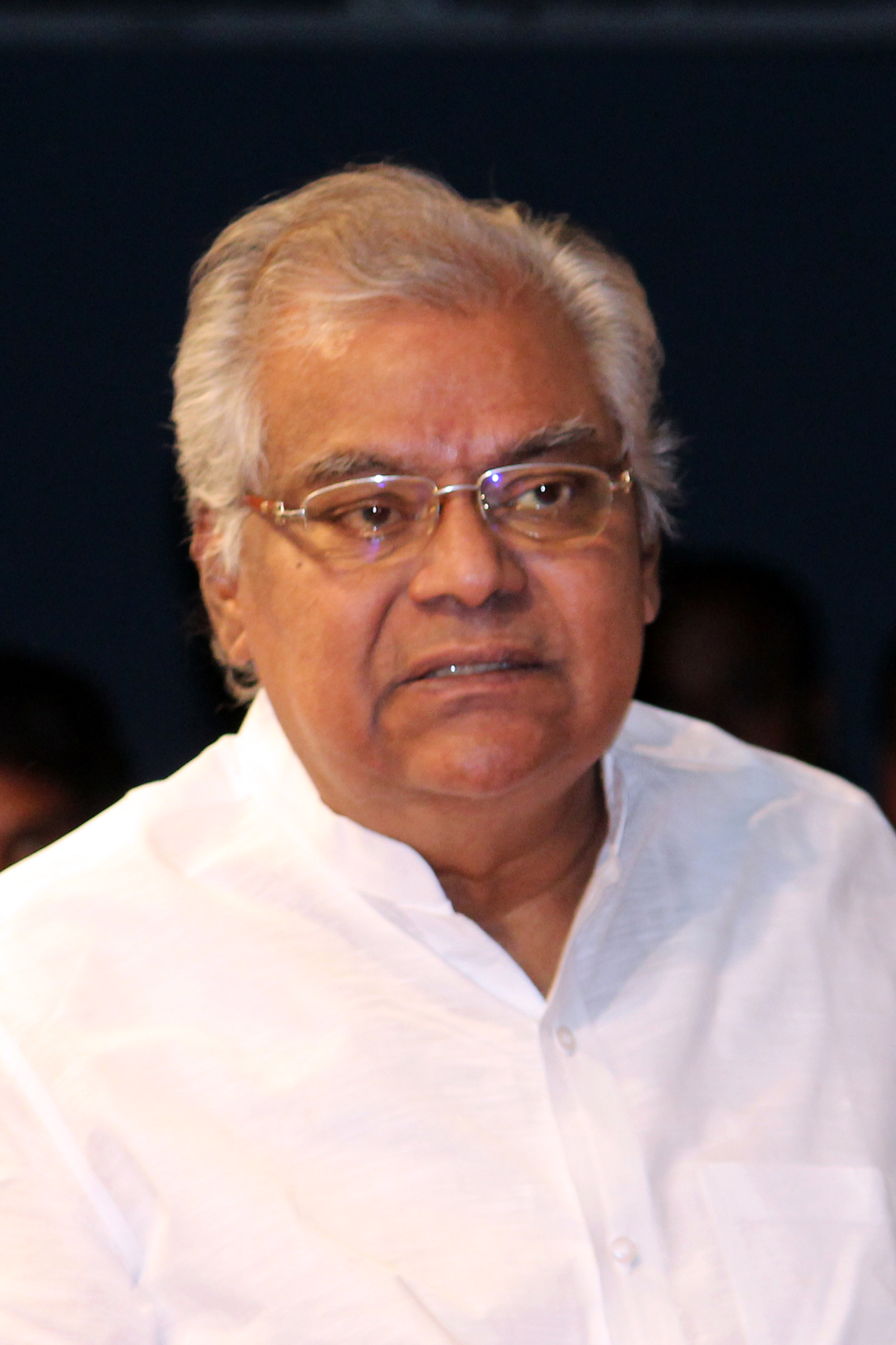
- Kota in 2016
- Born: 10 July 1942; Kankipadu, Vijayawada, Madras Province, British India (present-day Andhra Pradesh, India)
- Died: 13 July 2025 (aged 83); Jubilee Hills, Hyderabad, Telangana, India
- Occupations: Actor; politician
- Years active: 1977–2025
- Political party: Bharatiya Janata Party
- Spouse: Rukmani (m. 1965)
- Children: 3
- Honours: Padma Shri (2015)

Member of Legislative Assembly, Andhra Pradesh
- In office 11 October 1999 – 11 May 2004
- Preceded by: Vangaveeti Ratnakumari
- Succeeded by: Vangaveeti Radha Krishna
- Constituency: Vijayawada East

Kota Srinivasa Rao (10 July 1942 – 13 July 2025) was an Indian actor and politician. Known for his work primarily in Telugu cinema and theatre, he also starred in films in Tamil, Hindi, Kannada and Malayalam. As a politician, Rao has served as the MLA from Vijayawada East in Andhra Pradesh, India from 1999 to 2004. He made his debut with the Telugu film Pranam Khareedu in 1978. He starred in over 750 feature films. He won nine state Nandi Awards in various categories of villain, character actor, and supporting actor. In 2012, he garnered the SIIMA Award for his work in Krishnam Vande Jagadgurum. In 2015, he was awarded the Padma Shri, India's fourth highest civilian honour, for his contribution to Indian cinema. Rao's last film appearance was Hari Hara Veera Mallu, which was released in 2025.

== Early life ==
Kota Srinivasa Rao was born on 10 July 1942 in a Telugu brahmin family in the village of Kankipadu in present-day Andhra Pradesh. His father Seetha Rama Anjaneyulu was a doctor. Srinivasa Rao initially aimed to become a doctor but eventually couldn't make it because of his love towards acting. He started his career on stage in plays during college. He had a Bachelor of Science degree and worked as a State Bank employee before entering the film industry.

Srinivasa Rao's younger brother Kota Sankara Rao is also an actor. He works in a nationalised bank and acts primarily in TV soap operas.

In 1978, Rao made his debut in the Telugu industry with Pranam Khareedu. He has received wide critical acclaim for his diverse roles in films such as S/O Satyamurthy (2015), Attarintiki Daredi (2013), Rakta Charitra (2010), Leader (2010), Ready (2008), Pellaina Kothalo (2006), Sarkar (2006), Bommarillu (2006), Chatrapathi (2005), Athadu (2005), Aa Naluguru (2004), Malliswari (2004), Idiot (2002), Prudhvi Narayana (2002), Chinna (2000), Ganesh (1998), Anaganaga Oka Roju (1997), Little Soldiers (1996), Aame (1994), Hello Brother (1994), Teerpu (1994), Govindha Govindha (1993), Gaayam (1993), Money (1993), Sathruvu (1990), Siva (1989), Aha Naa Pellanta (1987), Pratighatana (1985), and Repati Pourulu (1986).

== Personal life ==
Rao married Rukmini in 1965 rukmani born on 24 June 1945 and they had three children (2 daughters and a son). Their son, Kota Venkata Anjaneya Prasad, died on 20 June 2010 in a road accident in Hyderabad. Prasad acted in J. D. Chakravarthy's film Siddham and alongside his father in Gaayam 2 (2010).

=== Death ===
Kota Srinivasa Rao died in the early hours of 13 July 2025, at the age of 83, at his residence in Film Nagar, Jubilee Hills, Hyderabad, following a prolonged illness. His death came just three days after his 83rd birthday.

His death marked the end of an era in Telugu cinema. Over a career spanning more than four decades, Rao acted in over 750 films across Telugu, Tamil, Kannada, Malayalam, and Hindi cinema. He was known for his versatility, voice modulation, and impactful performances in both villainous and comedic roles.

He was a recipient of several honours, including the Padma Shri in 2015 and nine Nandi Awards for his performances.

His death was mourned across the Indian film industry:

- Director S. S. Rajamouli called him "a master of his craft" whose characters would live on forever.
- Actor Chiranjeevi, a longtime collaborator, expressed deep grief and said that Rao's range and voice modulation were unmatched.

== Filmography ==
=== As actor ===
==== Telugu ====
List of Kota Srinivasa Rao film credits in Telugu cinema
Year	Title	Role	Notes
1978	Pranam Khareedu		
1979	Maavoori Devatha		
1983	Moodu Mullu		
1983	Amarajeevi		
1984	Devanthakudu		
1985	Babayi-Abbayi		
1985	Vande Mataram		
1985	Pratighatana	Kasaiah	
1986	Tandra Paparayudu	Hyder Jung	
1986	Ashtalakshmi Vaibhavam	Ravana	
1986	Prema Gharshana		
1986	Dora Bidda		
1986	Chaitanyam		
1986	Poojaku Panikiraani Puvvu		
1986	Vivaha Bandham		
1986	Karpoora Deepam		
1986	Chadastapu Mogudu		
1986	Naa Pilupe Prabhanjanam	Akkupakshi	
1986	Santhi Nivasam		
1986	Cowboy No. 1		
1986	Repati Pourulu		
1986	Ide Naa Samadhanam	Satyam	
1987	Aha Naa Pellanta	Lakshmipathi	
1987	Attagaru Zindabad	Chintapikkala Chinna Rao	
1987	Marana Homam		
1987	Dayamayudu		
1987	Rowdy Babai		
1987	Kaboye Alludu		
1987	Veera Pratap	Marati	
1987	Kulala Kurukshetram		
1987	Rowdy Police		
1987	Bharatamlo Arjunudu		
1987	Chaitanya Ratham		
1987	Maa Voori Magadu	Sathakopam	
1987	Jebu Donga	Rambantu	
1987	Bhargava Ramudu		
1987	Subhavartha		
1987	Mandaladeesudu	Bhima Rao	
1987	Sri Kanaka Maalakshmi Recording Dance Troop	Yella Papa Rao	
1988	Varasudochhadu		
1988	Sahasam Cheyara Dimbhaka	Harmonium Hanumantha Rao	
1988	Choopulu Kalasina Subhavela	Gurnadham	
1988	Yamudiki Mogudu	Kotayya	
1988	Khaidi No. 786	Surya Chandra Rao	
1988	Bandipotu	M.L.A. Yedukondalu	
1988	Premayanam		
1988	Maa Inti Maharaju		
1988	Rocky		
1988	Jhansi Rani	Neelakantham, CB-CID Officer	
1988	Prana Snehithulu		
1988	Veguchukka Pagatichukka		
1988	Ooregimpu		
1988	Asthulu Anthasthulu		
1988	Doctor Gari Abbayi		
1988	Mugguru Kodukulu		
1988	Nyayaniki Siksha	Dharmaraju	
1988	Praja Pratinidhi		
1988	Mr. Hero	Sarabhaiah	
1988	Bazaar Rowdy		
1988	Collector Vijaya		
1988	Ugranethrudu	Pachipenta Papa Rao	
1988	Kaliyuga Karnudu	Panganamala King George	
1988	O Bharya Katha	Sundar Rao	
1989	Swara Kalpana		
1989	Police Report		
1989	Hai Hai Nayaka	Pedda Rayudu	
1989	Bava Bava Panneeru		
1989	Bandhuvulostunnaru Jagratha	Suraiah	
1989	Naa Mogudu Naa Sontham		
1989	Sahasame Naa Oopiri		
1989	Black Tiger		
1989	Zoo Lakataka		
1989	Bhagavan		
1989	Krishna Gari Abbayi		
1989	Rajakeeya Chadarangam		
1989	Siva	Machiraju	
1989	Preminchi Chudu	Akkineni Bala Chandra aka A B C Chowdary	
1989	Mouna Poratam		
1989	Sarvabhoumudu	Appanna	
1989	Vicky Daada	Inspector Kota	
1989	Ajatha Satruvu	Papaala Parandhamaiah	
1989	Oorantha Golanta	Dasavatharam	
1989	Jayammu Nischayammu Raa!	Patel	
1989	Dorikithe Dongalu	Bhairava Murthy	
1989	Palnati Rudraiah	Sisupala Rayudu	
1990	Chevilo Puvvu	Manager Venkateswara Rao	
1990	Maa Inti Katha		
1990	Aggi Ramudu		
1990	Jayasimha	Devadanam	
1990	Kondaveeti Rowdy		
1990	Alajadi		
1990	Master Kapuram		
1990	Udhyamam	Rajaram	
1990	Sathruvu	Venkatarathnam	
1990	Prajala Manishi	Bhupathi	
1990	Justice Rudrama Devi	Sanyasi Rao	
1990	Nagastram		
1990	Iddaru Iddare		
1990	Kaliyuga Abhimanyudu	Kukkala Kanaka Rao aka Pithaji	
1990	Inspector Rudra		
1990	Sahasa Putrudu		
1990	Yama Dharmaraju		
1990	Prema Zindabad		
1990	Bobbili Raja	Ahobala Rao	
1990	Raja Vikramarka	Raja Kotappa	
1991	Seetharamayya Gari Manavaralu	Veerabhadraiah	
1991	Super Express	Inspector Ramaiah	
1991	Mamagaru	Pothuraja	
1991	Kobbari Bondam		
1991	Maha Yagnam		
1991	Pichi Pullayya		
1991	Chaitanya		
1991	Edu Kondalaswamy		
1991	Indra Bhavanam	Sanayya	
1991	Agni Nakshatram		
1991	Athiradhudu	Appala Naidu	
1991	Athmabandham		
1991	Prema Vijetha		
1991	Stuartpuram Police Station		
1991	Sathruvu		
1991	Prema Entha Madhuram	Narayan Rao	
1991	Chitram Bhalare Vichitram	G. Garudachalam	
1991	Rowdy Alludu	Venkat Ramudu	
1992	Pelli Neeku Shobhanam Naaku		
1992	Pachani Samsaram		
1992	Chilara Mogudu Allari Koduku		
1992	Aswamedham	Rayudu	
1992	Yamudannaki Mogudu		
1992	Mogudu Pellala Dongata		
1992	Gang War		
1992	Karuninchina Kanaka Durga		
1992	Srimaan Brahmachari		
1992	Nani		
1992	Joker Mama Super Alludu	Bangaraiah	
1992	Alexander		
1992	Bhale Khaideelu		
1992	Seetharatnam Gari Abbayi		
1992	Moratodu Naa Mogudu		
1992	Sundarakanda		
1992	Praana Daata		
1992	Akka Mogudu		
1992	420	Tadi Mattayya	
1992	Chittemma Mogudu	Military Babai	
1992	President Gari Pellam	Nadamuni	
1993	Rajendrudu Gajendrudu	Kotilingam	
1993	Amma Kodaku	Subbaiah	
1993	Kondapalli Raja		
1993	Manavarali Pelli	Peddi Raju	
1993	Rakshana		
1993	Tholi Muddu		
1993	Rendilla Poojari		
1993	Matru Devo Bhava		
1993	Pellama Majaka		
1993	Money		
1993	Mechanic Alludu	Kotappa	
1993	Jeevithame Oka Cinema		
1993	Mayalodu	Appalakonda	
1993	Vastavam		
1993	Inspector Ashwini		
1993	Pelli Gola		
1993	Konguchaatu Krishnudu		
1993	Attaku Koduku Mamaku Alludu		
1993	Nakshatra Poratam		
1993	Aarambham		
1993	Radha Saradhi		
1993	Jamba Lakidi Pamba	Ramalakshmi's father	
1993	Ish Gup Chup		
1993	Gaayam	Guru Narayan	
1993	Chinna Alludu		
1993	Ladies Special	Himself	
1993	Rowdy Mogudu	Srikakulam	
1993	Akka Pettanam Chelleli Kapuram		
1993	Bava Bavamaridi		
1993	Evandi Aavida Vachindi		
1993	Alibaba Aradajanu Dongalu		
1993	Mutha Mestri	Chitikela Pandiri	
1994	Govinda Govinda	Satyananda Swamy	
1994	Yes Nenante Nene	Appaji	
1994	Police Brothers		
1994	Yamaleela	Inspector Ranjith	
1994	Pelli Koduku		
1994	Maga Rayudu	Yama	
1994	Ammayi Kapuram		
1994	Number One		
1994	Muddula Priyudu		
1994	Hello Brother	Tadi Mattayya	
1994	Criminal		
1994	Gharana Alludu	Ramakoti	
1994	Andaru Andare		
1994	Aame	Srinivasa Rao	
1994	Top Hero	Dasu	
1994	Mugguru Monagallu		
1994	Raithu Bharatam		
1994	Kishkindha Kanda		
1994	Pacha Thoranam		
1994	Lucky Chance	Nayudamma	
1994	Police Alludu	Vishwanatham	
1994	Subhalagnam	Bangarayah	
1994	Super Police	Abbanna	
1994	Money Money	Allaudin	
1994	Hello Alludu		
1995	Subha Sankalpam		
1995	Ghatotkachudu	Mantrikudu	
1995	Badili		
1995	Rambantu		
1995	Alluda Majaka	Kota Pentaiah	
1995	Aasthi Mooredu Aasa Baredu		
1995	Raja Simham		
1995	Taj Mahal		
1995	Aalu Magalu		
1995	Sisindri		
1995	Aunty		
1995	Telugu Veera Levara	Pamu	
1995	Gharana Bullodu	Ammaji's husband	
1995	Bhale Bullodu		
1995	Maato Pettukoku	Mayor Geedapenta Basavaiah	
1995	Big Boss	Varadarajulu	
1995	Aayanaki Iddaru	Mysore Jackson	
1995	Akkum Bakkum		
1996	Jagadeka Veerudu	Raja Rao Bahadur	
1996	Bombay Priyudu		
1996	Intlo Illalu Vantintlo Priyuralu	Sriram's father	
1996	Sahanam		
1996	Once More		
1996	Topi Raja Sweety Roja		
1996	Gunshot		
1996	Mummy Mee Aayanochadu		
1996	Little Soldiers	Major Harishchandra Prasad	
1996	Akkada Abbai Ikkada Ammayi	Suleiman	
1996	Oho Naa Pellanta	Vallabha Rao	
1996	Pittala Dora		
1996	Vamshanikokkadu	Kotilingam	
1996	Vinodam	Bangaram	
1996	Anaganaga Oka Roju		
1997	Chilakkottudu		
1997	Annamayya	Minister	
1997	Veedevadandi Babu		
1997	Panjaram		
1997	Collector Garu		
1997	Evandi Pelli Chesukondi		
1997	Hello I Love You		
1997	Illalu		
1997	Thoka Leni Pitta		
1997	Peddanayya		
1997	Aahwanam		
1997	Priyaragalu		
1997	Ayyinda Leda	Kotesh, the multi-millionaire	
1997	Mama Bagunnavaa?		
1997	Maa Nannaki Pelli	Subba Raju	
1997	Super Heroes		
1997	Taraka Ramudu		
1997	Gokulamlo Seetha	Muddukrishnayya	
1997	Dongaata	Subbalakshmi's father	
1997	Chinnabbayi		
1997	Devudu	Gangaraju	
1998	Pratishta	Katari	
1998	Aavida Maa Aavide	Murari	
1998	Maavidaakulu	Bapineedu	
1998	Pelli Peetalu		
1998	Bavagaru Bagunnara?	Pedda Basavaraju	
1998	Asala Sandadi		
1998	Gamyam	Bapineedu	
1998	Sreevarante Maavare		
1998	Kanyadanam	Venkat's father	
1998	Ganesh	Health Minister Samba Sivudu	
1998	Pavitra Prema		
1998	Kodukulu		
1998	Pape Naa Pranam		
1998	Sri Ramulayya		
1998	Raayudu		
1998	Suryavamsam	Major Yeddulayya	
1998	Subhalekhalu		
1999	Harischandra		
1999	Sneham Kosam		
1999	Swapnalokam		
1999	Vichitram	Simhachalam	
1999	Bharata Ratna		
1999	Swayamvaram		
1999	Samarasimha Reddy	Kanthamma's brother	
1999	Hello...Yama!	Yama Dharma Raja	
1999	Manikyam		
1999	Mechanic Mavayya	Rani's father	
2000	Postman	Ramkoti	
2000	Annayya	Babai	
2000	Manasunna Maaraju		
2000	Nuvvu Vastavani	Koteswara Rao	
2000	Badri	Badri's father	
2000	Maa Pelliki Randi		
2000	Vamsi	Ankineedu's gang member	
2000	Okkadu Chalu	Nandigama Narayana	
2000	Ayodhya Ramayya		
2000	Prema Sandadi		
2000	Cheliya Cheliya Chirukopama		
2000	Manasunna Maaraju		
2000	Vijayaramaraju		
2000	Sakumba Saparivara Sametamga		
2001	Orey Thammudu		
2001	Chinna	Appa Rao	
2001	Student No. 1	Leakage Sambashiva Rao	
2001	Daddy	Shanti's paternal uncle	
2001	Maa Aavida Meeda Ottu Mee Aavida Chala Manchidi		
2001	Maa Aayana Sundarayya		
2001	Eduruleni Manishi		
2001	Preminchu	Dolly's father	
2001	Prematho Raa	Chandu's grandfather	
2001	Pandanti Samsaram	Chalapathi	
2001	Family Circus	Lance Naik Bhaghat	
2001	Naa Manasistha Raa		
2001	Akasa Veedhilo	G.K.	
2001	Adhipati	Gnaneswara Rao	
2001	Thank You Subba Rao		
2001	Veedekkadi Mogudandi		
2001	Badrachalam		
2001	Idem Oorura Babu		
2001	Hanuman Junction		
2001	Darling Darling	Srinivasa Rao	
2002	Kondaveeti Simhasanam		
2002	Raghava	Lakshma Reddy	
2002	Avunu Valliddaru Ista Paddaru!		
2002	O Chinadana		
2002	Santosham	Himsaraju / Vikram	
2002	Allari	Mahabala Rao	
2002	Tappu Chesi Pappu Koodu	Pedda Koteswara Rao	
2002	Idiot	Head Constable Venkata Swamy	
2002	Prudhvi Narayana	Narayana	
2002	Sandade Sandadi	Lakshmi Narayana / Lucky	
2002	Premalo Pavani Kalyan	Sitarama Raju	
2002	Gelupu		
2003	Pellam Oorelithe		
2003	Ammulu		
2003	Donga Ramudu and Party	K. Srinivas	
2003	Simhachalam	Home Minister	
2003	Pellamto Panenti	Kalyani's father	
2003	Simhadri		
2003	Tagore		
2003	Satyam	Shankar	
2004	Pellam Oorelithe		
2004	Malliswari	Bhavani Prasad	
2004	Naani	Doctor	
2004	Shanti Sandesham		
2004	Gudumba Shankar	Devudu	
2004	Suryam	Police Officer	
2004	Satta		
2005	Orey Pandu	Police Inspector	
2005	Dhairyam	Makarana's father	
2005	Soggadu	Ravi's father	
2005	Naa Alludu	Bilahari	
2005	Hungama	Pedda Babu	
2005	Athadu	Baaji Reddy	
2005	Chatrapati	Appala Naidu	
2005	Allari Bullodu		
2005	Allari Pidugu	Subbalakshmi's father	
2005	Seenugadu Chiranjeevi Fan	Seenu's grandfather	
2005	Sri		
2005	Mahanandi	Nayar	
2006	Shock	Dharma Reddy	
2006	Nandanavanam 120km	Banerjee	
2006	Andala Ramudu	Bhushanam	
2006	Sainikudu	Chief Minister	
2006	Pellaina Kothalo	Veeraraju	
2006	Pournami	Nagendra Naidu	
2006	Bommarillu	Kanaka Rao	
2006	Rakhi	Rakhi's grandfather	
2006	Khatarnak	Dasu's father	
2007	Yogi	Kotaiah	
2007	Bhajantreelu		
2007	Athidi	MLA Maccha Srinu	
2007	Pellaindi Kaani	Rajeshwari's brother	
2007	Lakshyam	Chandu & Bose's father	
2007	Munna	Srinivas Rao	
2007	Aadavari Matalaku Ardhalu Verule	Ganesh's father	
2007	Classmates	Professor Chandram	
2008	Krishna	K. Srinivasa Rao [Advocate]	
2008	Okka Magadu		
2008	Visakha Express	Mohan Rao	
2008	Idi Sangathi	Chief Minister	
2008	Nee Sukhame Ne Korukunna	Sarvabhouma Rao	
2008	Salute	Home Minister Kondal Rao	
2008	Ready	Peddi Naidu	
2008	Sundarakanda	Kota	
2008	Kousalya Supraja Rama	Ranga Rao	
2008	Kantri	Daiva Sahayam	
2008	Bujjigadu	Machi Reddy	
2008	Hare Ram	G. Siva Reddy (Health Minister)	
2008	Pourudu	Kasi	
2008	Hero	Ram Mohan Rao	
2008	Gajibiji		
2009	Aa Intlo		
2009	Rajavari Chepala Cheruvu		
2009	Evaraina Epudaina		
2009	Sare Nee Istam		
2009	Kick	Minister	
2009	Sankham	Pasupathi	
2009	Anjaneyulu	Gurudev	
2009	Posani Gentleman		
2010	Leader	Mahadevayya (Peddayana)	
2010	Maro Charitra		
2010	Darling	Vishwanath's father	
2010	Simha	Veerakesavudu's father	
2010	Gaayam 2	Guru Narayana	
2010	Khaleja	Raju's Grandfather	
2010	Brindaavanam	Durga Prasad	
2010	Rakta Charitra	Rajidi Nagamani Reddy	
2010	Kalyan Ram Kathi	Krishna Mohan's father	
2010	Rakta Charitra 2	Rajidi Nagamani Reddy	
2010	Kathi Kantha Rao	Ringu Raja Rao	
2010	Ragada	Gangaiah	
2011	Mirapakaay	Shankar Anna	
2011	Dookudu	Mallesh Goud	
2011	Bejawada	Ramana	
2011	Maaro	Venkatratnam	
2011	Kshetram	Chinnanna	
2012	Bodyguard	Siva Reddy	
2012	Dhammu	Raja of Veera Durgam Fort	
2012	Adhinayakudu	Politician	
2012	Srimannarayana	Rajan Modaliyar	
2012	Rachcha	Baireddanna	
2012	Nenu Naa Rakshasi	Vishwanath	
2012	Gabbar Singh	Bhagyalakshmi's father	
2012	Poola Rangadu	Ranga's father	
2012	Julayi	MLA Varadarajulu	
2012	Denikaina Ready	Rudrama Naidu	
2012	Cameraman Gangatho Rambabu	Jawahar Naidu	
2012	Krishnam Vande Jagadgurum	Subrahmanyam	
2013	Seethamma Vakitlo Sirimalle Chettu	Brahmananda Rao	
2013	Ramayya Vasthavayya	Umapathi	
2013	Doosukeltha	Rajeshwar	
2013	Attarintiki Daredi	Siddhappa Naidu	
2013	Okkadine	Sivaiah	
2013	Naayak	Minister	
2014	Yevadu	Central Minister	
2014	Race Gurram	Hanumayya	
2014	Prathinidhi	Chief Minister Sambasiva Rao	
2014	Jump Jilani	Venkatnarayana	
2014	Power	Baldev's Uncle	
2014	Anukshanam	Home Minister	
2014	Run Raja Run	Minister Govindharaju	
2014	Govindudu Andarivadele	Balaraju's brother	
2015	Temper	Judge	
2015	S/O Satyamurthy	Devaraj's Father	
2015	Lion	Murugan	
2015	Jadoogadu		
2015	Subramanyam for Sale	Govind's father	
2016	Terror	Home Minister K. Sudarshan Rao	
2016	Ghatana	Viswanatham	
2017	Gunturodu	MLA Koteswara Rao	
2017	Radha	Chief Minister	
2017	Balakrishnudu	Raghunandan Yadav	
2017	Jawaan	Baabai (Uncle)	
2018	Achari America Yatra	Chakrapani	
2018	Gayatri	Judge	
2019	Maharshi	Pooja's grandfather	
2019	ABCD: American Born Confused Desi	Koteswara	
2019	Sita	Basavaraju's father-in-law	
2019	Rajdooth	Sanjay's grandfather	
2019	Oorantha Anukuntunnaru	Oori Pedda	
2021	Konda Polam	Grandfather of Ravi	
2021	Power Play		
2022	Hero	Arjuna's father	
2023	Suvarna Sundari	Priest	
2025	Hari Hara Veera Mallu	Peddha Dora	Posthumous film

==== Tamil ====
Year	Title	Role	Notes
2003	Saamy	Perumal Pichai	
2004	Kuthu	Annamalai	
2004	Jore	Lingam	
2004	Aai	Naachiyaar	
2004	Jaisurya	Highways Govindan	
2005	Thirupaachi	Saniyan Saggadai	
2006	Paramasivan	Swami Kathirvedhi	
2006	Kokki	Uppiliappan	
2008	Sadhu Miranda	Venkata Sabhapathy	
2008	Sathyam	Home Minister Kondal Dhasan	
2008	Dhanam	Vedhagiri	
2009	Karthik Anitha	Ramachandramoorthy	
2009	Perumal		
2009	Laadam	Pavadai	
2009	Odipolama	Anjali's father	
2009	Jaganmohini	Sidhar	
2010	Kanagavel Kaaka	Ayyanarappan	
2010	Ambasamuthiram Ambani	Annachi	
2011	Bhavani	Sivalingam	
2011	Ko	Aalavandhan	
2011	Mambattiyan	Annachchi	
2012	Saguni	Perumal	
2012	Thaandavam	Home Minister	
2012	Maasi	Paramasivam	
2013	All in All Azhagu Raja	Chokkanathan	
2014	Malini 22 Palayamkottai	Santhanam	
2014	Damaal Dumeel	Ilavarasu	
2014	Thalaivan		Cameo appearance
2014	Thalakonam	Minister Sethupathy	
2017	Maragadha Naanayam	Astrologer	
2018	Saamy 2	Ilaiya Perumal (Perumal Pichai)	Cameo
2018	Kaathadi	Seth	

==== Hindi ====
Year	Title	Role	Notes
1987	Pratighaat		
2005	Sarkar	Selver Mani	
2006	Darwaza Bandh Rakho	Veterinary Doctor Umapathi	
2007	Darling	Psychiatrist	
2009	Luck	Swami	
2009	Kirkit		
2010	Rakta Charitra	Rajidi Nagamani Reddy	
2010	Rakta Charitra 2	Rajidi Nagamani Reddy	
2016	Baaghi	Dasanna	

==== Kannada ====
Year	Title	Role	Notes
1997	Lady Commissioner		
2003	Raktha Kanneeru		
2004	Love		
2005	Namma Basava	Pampathy	
2005	Nammanna		
2007	Masti		
2011	Srimathi		
2023	Kabzaa		

==== Other languages ====
Year	Title	Role	Language	Notes
2006	Hyderabad Nawabs	Dasanna	Deccani	
2011	The Train	Yogesh Thivari	Malayalam	

=== As singer ===
Year	Title	Song	Notes
1995	Sisindri	"Ori Naayano"	
2012	Gabbar Singh	"Mandu Babulam"	

=== As dubbing artist ===
Year	Title	Actor	Notes	Ref.
1993	Gentleman	Goundamani	Telugu dubbed version	
1996	Bharatyeedu	Goundamani	Telugu dubbed version	
1999	Narasimha	Manivannan	Telugu dubbed version	
1999	Premikula Roju	Goundamani	Telugu dubbed version	
1999	Oke Okkadu	Manivannan	Telugu dubbed version	
2000	Priyuralu Pilichindi	Manivannan	Telugu dubbed version	
2002	Baba	Goundamani	Telugu dubbed version	
2005	Majaa	Manivannan	Telugu dubbed version	
2007	Sivaji: The Boss	Manivannan	Telugu dubbed version	

== Awards ==
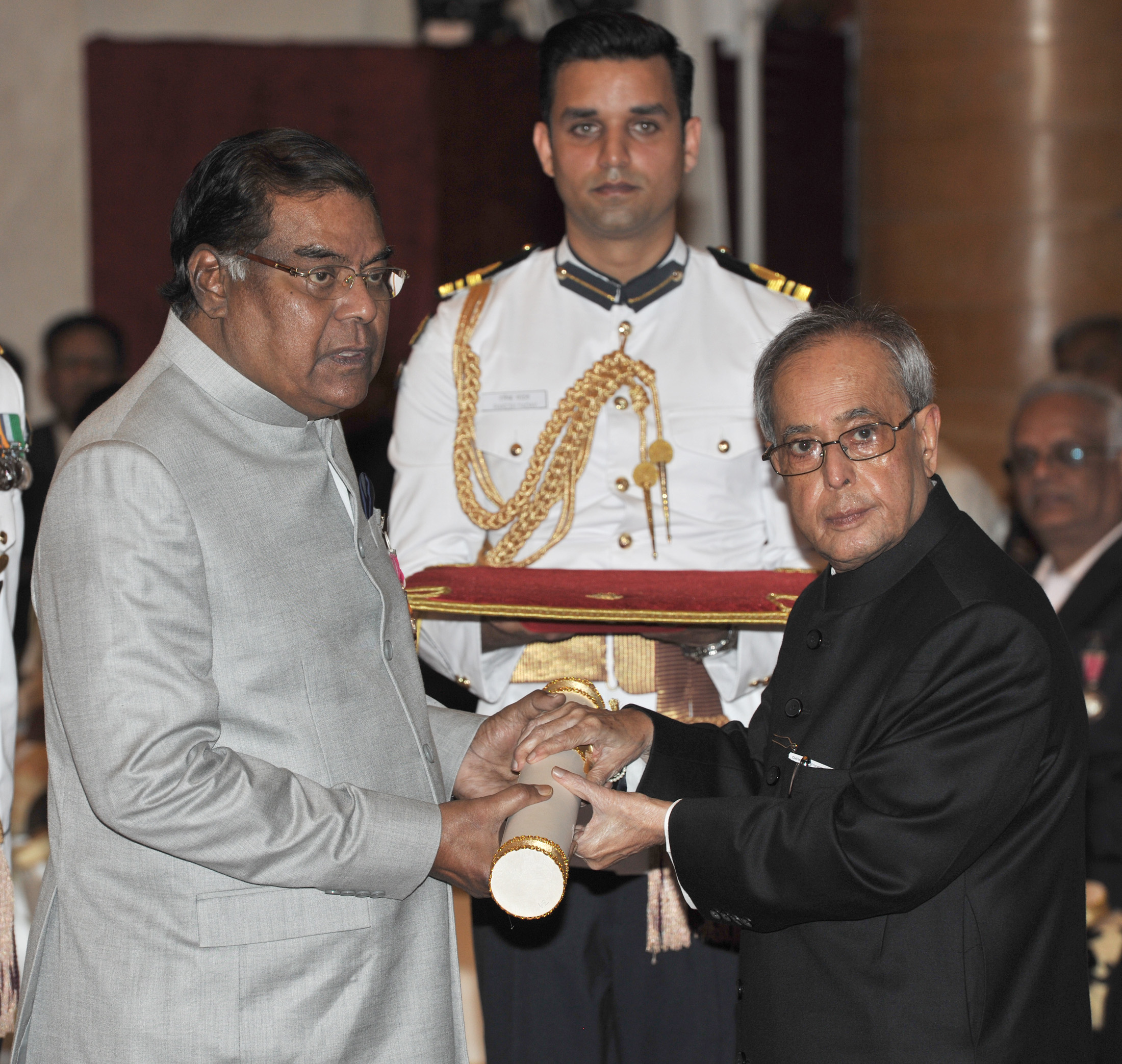
The President, Shri Pranab Mukherjee presenting the Padma Shri Award to Kota Srinivasa Rao in 2015.

Civilian Honours

- Padma Shri (2015)

Nandi Awards

- Special Jury Award – Pratighatana (1985)
- Best Villain – Gaayam (1993)
- Best Villain – Teerpu (1994)
- Best Character Actor – Little Soldiers (1996)
- Best Villain – Ganesh (1998)
- Best Villain – Chinna (2001)
- Best Supporting Actor – Prudhvi Narayana (2002)
- Best Character Actor – Aa Naluguru (2004)
- Best Character Actor – Pellaina Kothalo (2006)

SIIMA Awards

- South Indian International Movie Award – Best Supporting Actor – Krishnam Vande Jagadgurum (2012)

Other honours

- Allu Ramalingaiah Puraskaram
