= Satyanand =

Satyanand is a surname and given name may refer :

== Surname ==
- Anand Satyanand (born 1944), New Zealand governor-general
- Paidipalli Satyanand, Indian film writer

== Given name ==
- Satyanand Bhogta, Indian politician
