= Rajendra Prasad filmography =

Filmography of Indian actor Rajendra Prasad

Rajendra Prasad is an Indian actor who predominantly works in Telugu cinema.

== Telugu films ==
Key
†	Denotes films that have not yet been released

Year	Title	Role	Notes	Ref.
1977	Sneham	Chandram		
1979	Chaaya	Prasad		
1980	Nijam			
1980	Aadadi Gadapa Daatite			
1980	Moodu Mulla Bandham	Murali		
1981	Daari Tappina Manishi	Atma		
1982	Ee Charitra Ae Sirato	Varun		
1982	Manchu Pallaki	Hari		
1982	Kalavari Samsaram	Rajeev		
1983	Mundadugu	Mohan		
1983	Pelli Choopulu	Sivaiah		
1983	Pelli Chesi Chupestham	Papa Rao		
1983	Navodayam	Vikram		
1983	Ramarajyamlo Bheemaraju	Satish		
1983	Poratam	Tailor Appa Rao		
1983	Idi Kaadu Mugimpu	Krishna		
1983	Ee Pillaku Pellavutundaa?	Dancer		
1983	Ee Desamlo Oka Roju	Bus Passenger		
1983	Adavalle Aligithe	Karthik		
1984	Ee Chaduvulu Makkodu	Kishan		
1984	Aakali Neeku Joharlu			
1984	Rojulu Marayi	Kaamesam		
1984	Udayam	Raja		
1984	Gudi Gantalu Mrogayi	Mestri		
1984	Sampoorna Premayanam	Prasad		
1984	Tandava Krishnudu	Raja		
1984	Challenge	Vidyarthi		
1984	Swati	Subba Rao		
1984	Yama Doothalu	Raja		
1984	James Bond 999	Bose		
1984	Rustum	Paper Punna Rao		
1985	Vandemataram	Dr.G. N. Kal / Nukaal		
1985	Yamudu	Vinod		
1985	Ada Pillale Nayam	Devadasu		
1985	Ottuku Viluva Ivvandi			
1985	Aagraham	Shankar		
1985	Deshamlo Dongalu Paddaru			
1985	Muddula Chellelu	Luli Rao		
1985	Mangalya Bandham	Bus Conductor		
1985	Garjana	Balu		
1985	Musugu Donga	Giri		
1985	Anadiga Aadadi	Shankar		
1985	Darja Donga	Prasad		
1985	Kotha Pelli Koothuru	Raja		
1985	Babai Abbai	Taxi Driver		
1985	Muchataga Mugguru	Ramesh		
1985	Preminchu Pelladu	Rambabu	Debut as a lead actor	
1985	Kattula Kondayya	Inspector Vijay		
1985	Donga	Inspector Ravi		
1985	Puli	Inspector Prasad		
1985	Bharyabhartala Bhandam	Madan		
1985	Pattabhishekam	Rajesh		
1986	Kashmora	Dharka		
1986	Karu Diddina Kapuram	Satya Keerthi David		
1986	Punyasthree	Peter		
1986	Padaharella Ammayi	Chanti		
1986	Aranyakanda	Singadu		
1986	Pavitra	Kishtaiah		
1986	Brahmastram	Raja		
1986	Captain Nagarjun	Ravi		
1986	Rakshasudu	Inspector Vijay		
1986	Oka Radha Iddaru Krishnulu	Prasad		
1986	Ladies Tailor	Sundaram (Tailor)		
1986	Rendu Rella Aaru	Mad / Madhusudhana Rao / Venkata Sivam		
1987	Samsaram Oka Chadarangam	Raghava		
1987	Lawyer Suhasini	Surya Prakash Rao		
1987	Satyagraham	DEO	Cameo appearance	
1987	Dharmapatni	Bosu Babu		
1987	Madana Gopaludu	Gopalam		
1987	Manmadha Leela Kamaraju Gola	Kamaraju		
1987	Makutamleni Maharaju	Mohan		
1987	Trimurtulu	Sandeep		
1987	Kaboye Alludu	Prasad		
1987	Damit Katha Adam Thirigindi	Gagapathi & Chakravarthy	Dual role	
1987	Gundamma Gari Krishnulu	Gopala Krishna		
1987	Bhale Mogudu	Ramakrishna		
1987	Dabbevariki Chedu	Vidyasagar		
1987	Gandhinagar Rendava Veedhi	Prabhu / Ram Singh		
1987	Aha Naa Pellanta	Krishna Murthy		
1987	Naku Pellam Kavali	Lakshmana		
1988	Samsaram	Ravi Babu		
1988	Bhama Kalapam	Krishna Murthy		
1988	Thodallullu	Bhaskar		
1988	Aanimuthyam	Inspector Murali		
1988	Bava Marudula Saval	Inspector Jai Kumar		
1988	Asthulu Anthasthulu	Kishtaiyah		
1988	Bharya Bhartala Bhagotham	Basu / Bhagothula Subramanyam		
1988	Jeevana Jyothi	Akbar		
1988	Jhansi Rani	Mr. V / Sriraj		
1988	Pelli Chesi Choodu	Mohan		
1988	Jeevana Ganga	Raja		
1988	Chinnodu Peddodu	Chinnodu		
1988	Sahasam Cheyara Dimbhaka	Chandram		
1988	Chikkadu Dorakadu	Raja & Chinnababu Dillep	Dual role	
1988	Station Master	Rama Rao		
1988	Donga Kollu	Alli Billi Anjineelu		
1988	Vivaha Bhojanambu	Sitarama Rao		
1989	Bandhuvulostunnaru Jagratha	Chittibabu		
1989	Paila Pacheesu	Suresh		
1989	Chettu Kinda Pleader	Balaraju		
1989	Bhale Dampathulu	Raja		
1989	Bamma Maata Bangaru Baata	Kishtaiah		
1989	Chalaki Mogudu Chadastapu Pellam	Giri		
1989	Gaduggai	Gopi / Pandu		
1989	Poola Rangadu	Ranga		
1989	Gopala Rao Gari Abbayi	Ranga		
1989	Muthyamantha Muddu	Anudeep		
1989	Jayammu Nischayammu Raa	Rambabu		
1989	Zoo Laka Taka	Prabhu		
1989	Preminchi Choodu	Chittibabu		
1989	Sakshi	Raja		
1990	Idem Pellam Baboi	Kalyana Chakravarthy		
1990	Guru Sishyulu	Babu		
1990	Ramba Rambabu	Rambabu		
1990	Dagudumuthala Dampathyam	Kishtaiah		
1990	Mama Alludu	Vijay		
1990	Mahajananiki Maradalu Pilla	Ravi / Kishtaiyah		
1990	Prema Zindabad	Gopalam		
1990	Chevilo Puvvu	Prasad		
1990	Navayugam			
1990	Master Kapuram	David		
1991	Vichitra Prema	Sivudu		
1991	Yerra Mandaram	Ramudu		
1991	Minor Raja	Minor Raja		
1991	Teneteega	Varun Kumar		
1991	April 1 Vidudala	Diwakaram		
1991	Attintlo Adde Mogudu	Gopi		
1991	Iddaru Pellala Muddula Police	Constable Kishtaiyah & Anand	Dual role	
1991	Edurinti Mogudu Pakkinti Pellam	Bava / Badaradandi Varaprasad		
1991	Prema Thapassu	Rathaiyah		
1991	Pelli Pustakam	KK / K. Krishna Murthy		
1991	Kobbari Bondam	Raju		
1992	Golmaal Govindam	Govindam		
1992	Appula Appa Rao	Appula Apparao		
1992	Subba Rayudi Pelli	Subbarayudu		
1992	Pellaniki Premalekha Priyuraliki Subhalekha	Raja		
1992	Brundavanam	Ravi		
1992	Seetapathi Chalo Tirupathi	Seethapati		
1992	Valu Jada Tolu Beltu	Accha Rao		
1992	Aa Okkati Adakku	Atukula Chitti Babu		
1993	Srinatha Kavi Sarvabhowmudu	Raja Vallabha Devudu		
1993	Ladies Special	Himself	Cameo	
1993	Rajendrudu Gajendrudu	Rajendra		
1993	Kannayya Kittayya	Kannaiya / Krishna & Kittayya	Dual role	
1993	Alibaba Aradajanu Dongalu	Alibaba		
1993	Joker	Balaji / Joker		
1993	Akka Pethanam Chellili Kapuram	Satyanarayana		
1993	Mayalodu	Veerababu		
1993	Mister Pellam	Balaji		
1993	Pekata Papa Rao	Pekata Papa Rao		
1994	Bramhachari Mogudu	Rambabu		
1994	Madam	Prasad / Madam Sarojini / Mandakini		
1994	Allarodu	Krishna Murthy		
1994	Parugo Parugu	Rambabu / Angala		
1994	Lucky Chance	Bosu		
1995	Vaddu Bava Thappu	Raja		
1995	Lingababu Love Story	Lingababu		
1995	Ketu Duplicatu	Vijay		
1995	Rambantu	Rambantu		
1996	Mummy Mee Aayanochadu	Satish		
1996	Topi Raja Sweety Roja	Raja	Also composer	
1996	Family	Krishna		
1996	Ladies Doctor	Dr. Ram Prasad		
1997	Hitler	Balu		
1997	Thaali	Ramu		
1997	Chilakkottudu	Rajendra Prasad		
1997	Jai Bajarangbali	Madhu		
1997	Mama Bagunnava	Gopala Krishna		
1998	Navvulata	Bosu		
1998	All Rounder	Balaraju		
1998	Ulta Palta	Raja & Raja	Dual role	
1998	Sisindri Babai			
1998	Mee Aayana Jagratha	Gopi Krishna		
1999	Chinni Chinni Aasa	Raja		
1999	Yamajathakudu	Yama Dharma Raju		
2000	Kshemamga Velli Labhamga Randi	Rambabu		
2000	Antha Mana Manchike	Jagapati		
2000	Ninne Premistha	Ramesh		
2000	Devullu	Hanuman		
2001	Ammo Bomma	Rambabu		
2001	Apparao Ki Oka Nela Thappindi	Schemes Apparao & Appula Apparao	Dual role	
2001	Family Circus	Pataudi		
2001	Akasa Veedhilo	Suribabu		
2001	Daddy	Prasad		
2001	Ammaye Navvithe	Sundaram		
2002	Sandade Sandadi	Balu		
2003	Sriramachandrulu	Sriram		
2003	Maa Alludu Very Good	A.V.Rao		
2004	Oka Pellam Muddu Rendo Pellam Vaddu	Hari Chandra		
2004	Andaru Dongale Dorikite	Bangaru Raju		
2004	Apparao Driving School	Apparao		
2004	Aa Naluguru	Raghuram		
2005	Andagadu	Sundaram		
2005	Pellam Pichodu	Srinivas / Srinu		
2006	Iddaru Attala Muddula Alludu	Balu		
2006	Sarada Saradaga	Balaraju		
2006	Bhagyalakshmi Bumper Draw	Bullabbai		
2007	Mee Sreyobhilashi	Rajaji		
2008	Appu Chesi Pappu Koodu			
2010	Brahmalokam To Yamalokam Via Bhulokam	Brahma		
2010	Gudu Gudu Gunjam	Gopalam		
2010	Baava	Sitaramudu		
2011	Bhale Mogudu Bhale Pellam	Venkat		
2011	Yemainadoi Naalo	Krishna		
2011	Mogudu	Anjaneya Prasad		
2012	Nippu	Narayana Murthy		
2012	Ayyare	Prasad / Swamiji / Krishna		
2012	Lovely	Maharadhi		
2012	Onamalu	Narayana Rao		
2012	Julai	DIG Sitaram		
2012	Dream	Army Officer		
2012	Cinemakeldam Randi			
2013	Manushulatho Jagratha	Yama Dharma Raju		
2013	Vasundhara Nilayam	Sanjeev Chaturvedi		
2013	Man of the Match	Radha Krishna		
2014	Aagadu	C.I. Rajarao		
2015	Top Rankers	Principal Viswanath		
2015	Tommy	Satyam Master		
2015	S/O Satyamurthy	Paida Sambasiva Rao		
2015	Noothi Lo Kappalu			
2015	Dagudumootha Dandakor	Rajugaru		
2015	Srimanthudu	Narayana Rao		
2015	Akhil	K.V. Rajendra Prasad		
2016	Nannaku Prematho	Ramesh Chandra Prasad alias Subramaniam		
2016	Eedo Rakam Aado Rakam	Advocate Narayana		
2016	Supreme	Nagaraju		
2016	Thikka	Manohar		
2016	Intlo Deyyam Nakem Bhayam	Gopala Krishna		
2017	Gunturodu	Suryanarayana		
2017	Andhhagadu	Ranjith Kulkarni		
2017	Shamanthakamani	Uma Maheswara Rao / Mahesh Babu		
2017	Raja The Great	Prasad		
2018	Oo Pe Ku Ha			
2018	Mahanati	K. V. Chowdary		
2018	Raju Gadu	Narayana		
2018	Srinivasa Kalyanam	Ramaraju		
2018	Ee Maaya Peremito	Babu Rao		
2018	Bewars	Satya Murthy		
2019	F2: Fun and Frustration	Prasad		
2019	Oh! Baby	Chanti		
2019	Burra Katha	Eeswara Rao		
2019	Kousalya Krishnamurthy	Krishna Murthy		
2019	Tholu Bommalata	Somaraju / Sodal Raju		
2020	Sarileru Neekevvaru	Siva Prasad		
2020	Ala Vaikunthapurramuloo	IG Prajapathi		
2020	College Kumar	Sasi Kumar		
2020	Miss India	Dr. Viswanatha Sastry		
2020	Solo Brathuke So Better	Venkataramana		
2021	Gaali Sampath	Gaali Sampath		
2021	Climax	Vijay Modi		
2021	Checkmate	Inspector Krishna Prasad		
2021	Gully Rowdy	Head Constable Patapagalu Venkat Rao		
2021	Pelli SandaD	Maya's father		
2021	Senapathi	Krishna Murthy		
2022	Super Machi	Prasad		
2022	F3: Fun and Frustration	C. I. Nagaraju		
2022	Macherla Niyojakavargam	Surendra		
2022	Anukoni Prayanam	Rajendra		
2022	Sasanasabha	Narayana Swamy		
2023	Waltair Veerayya	CI Seethapati		
2023	Organic Mama Hybrid Alludu	Venkataramaiah		
2023	Anni Manchi Sakunamule	Prasad Garikapati		
2023	Jilebi	Warden Dhairyam		
2023	Krishna Rama	Ramathirtham		
2024	Kalki 2898 AD	Rumi		
2024	Utsavam	Aaradhyulu		
2024	Janaka Aithe Ganaka	Judge		
2024	Laggam	Sadanandam		
2025	Shashtipoorthi	Diwakar		
2025	Single	Murthy		
2025	Robinhood	John Snow		
2025	Paradha	Krishna	Special appearance	
2025	Mass Jathara	Hanuman Bheri		
2026	Sahakutumbaanaam	Driver Prasad Rao		

=== As voice actor ===
Year	Title	Actor	Notes	Ref.
1980	Mouna Geetham	Mohan	Telugu dubbed version	
2000	Tenali	Jayaram	Telugu dubbed version	
2003	Boys	Vivek	Telugu dubbed version	

== Tamil films ==
Year	Title	Role	Notes
1981	Nandu	Rickshaw driver	
1983	Inimai Idho Idho		
1997	Vasuke	Balu	
2008	Nadigai	Himself	Special appearance
2019	Kee	Rao	
2021	Annabelle Sethupathi	Sivabalan	

== Other language films ==
Year	Title	Role	Language
2005	Mahasadhvi Mallamma	Barama Reddy	Kannada
2009	Quick Gun Murugan	Quick Gun Murugan	English

== Television ==
Year	Title	Role	Network	Language
2024	Bench Life	Isha's father	SonyLIV	Telugu
2024	Harikatha	Rangachari	Disney+ Hotstar	Telugu

== Discography ==
Year	Film	Songs	Notes
1991	Prema Thapassu	"Aadeshchane Ammi" "Ateto Avudha"	
2015	Noothilo Kappalu	"Tagithe Okka Sukka"	
