= Mano (singer) =

Indian singer

Kalaimamani Nagoor Babu
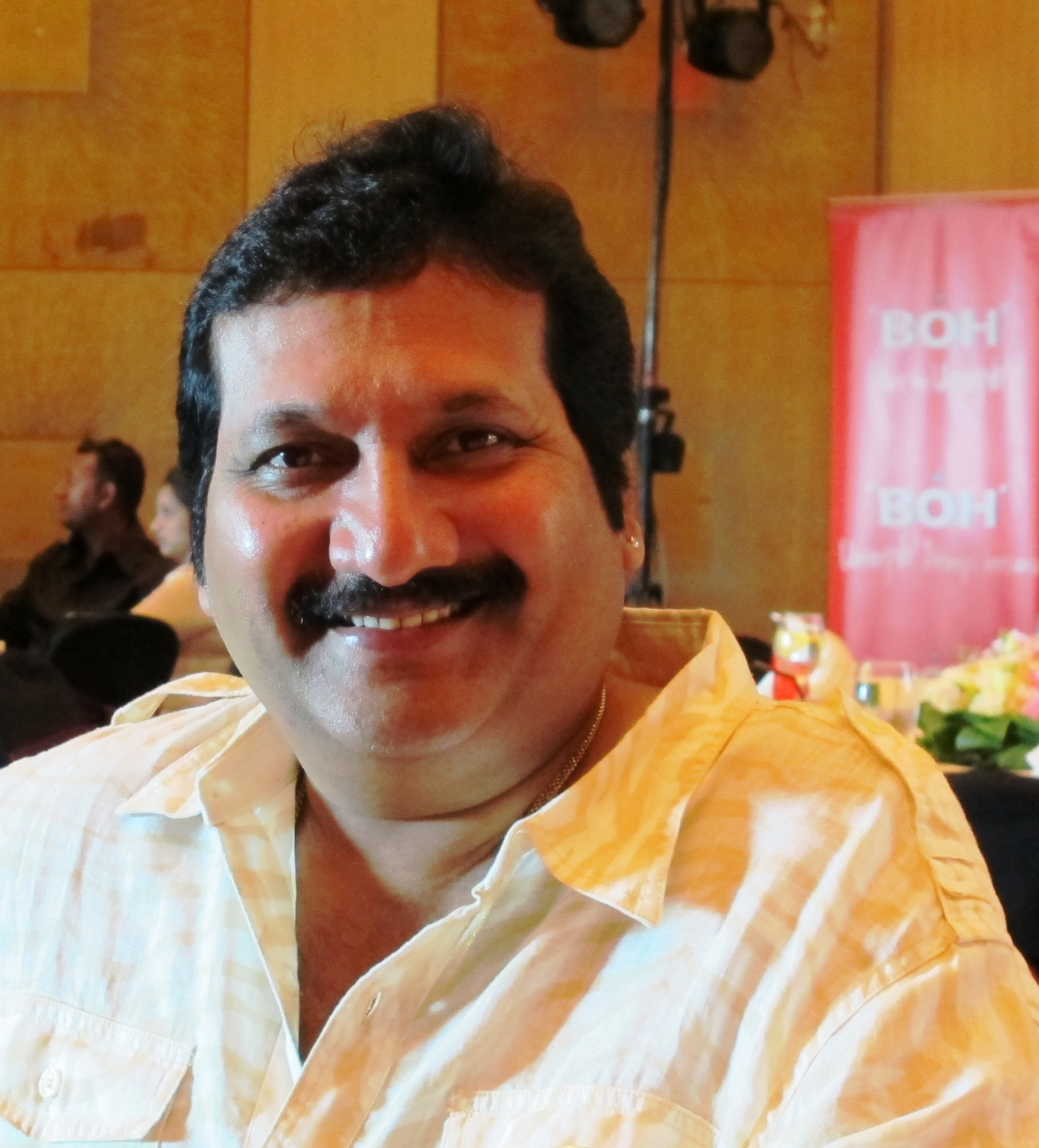
- Born: Nagoor Babu; 26 October 1965 (age 61); Sattenapalli, Andhra Pradesh, India
- Other name: Mano
- Known for: Nayakan; Roja; Josh; Kadhalan
- Television: Star Singer; Super Singer (multiple seasons); Super Singer Junior; Manathodu Mano; Kalyanam Kamaneeyam
- Spouse: Jameela Babu (1985-present)
- Children: 3
- Parents: Rasool Babu (father); Shaheeda Babu (mother)
- Musical career
- Genres: playback singing, carnatic music
- Occupations: Playback Singer, actor, producer, voice dubbing artist, music composer
- Years active: 1977–present
- Award: Kalaimamani Award (1994)

Nagoor Babu, known by his stage name Mano, is an Indian playback singer, voice-over artist, actor, and composer. Mano has recorded songs for film and private various Telugu, Tamil, Bengali, Kannada, Malayalam, Hindi, Tulu, Konkani and Assamese films. He has also performed for over 3000 live concerts across the continents. He has recorded many songs for music director Ilaiyaraaja. Mano is also recognized for being as the full-fledged dubbing artist for Rajinikanth in Telugu from Muthu (1995) onwards.

== Career ==
=== Early days and debut ===
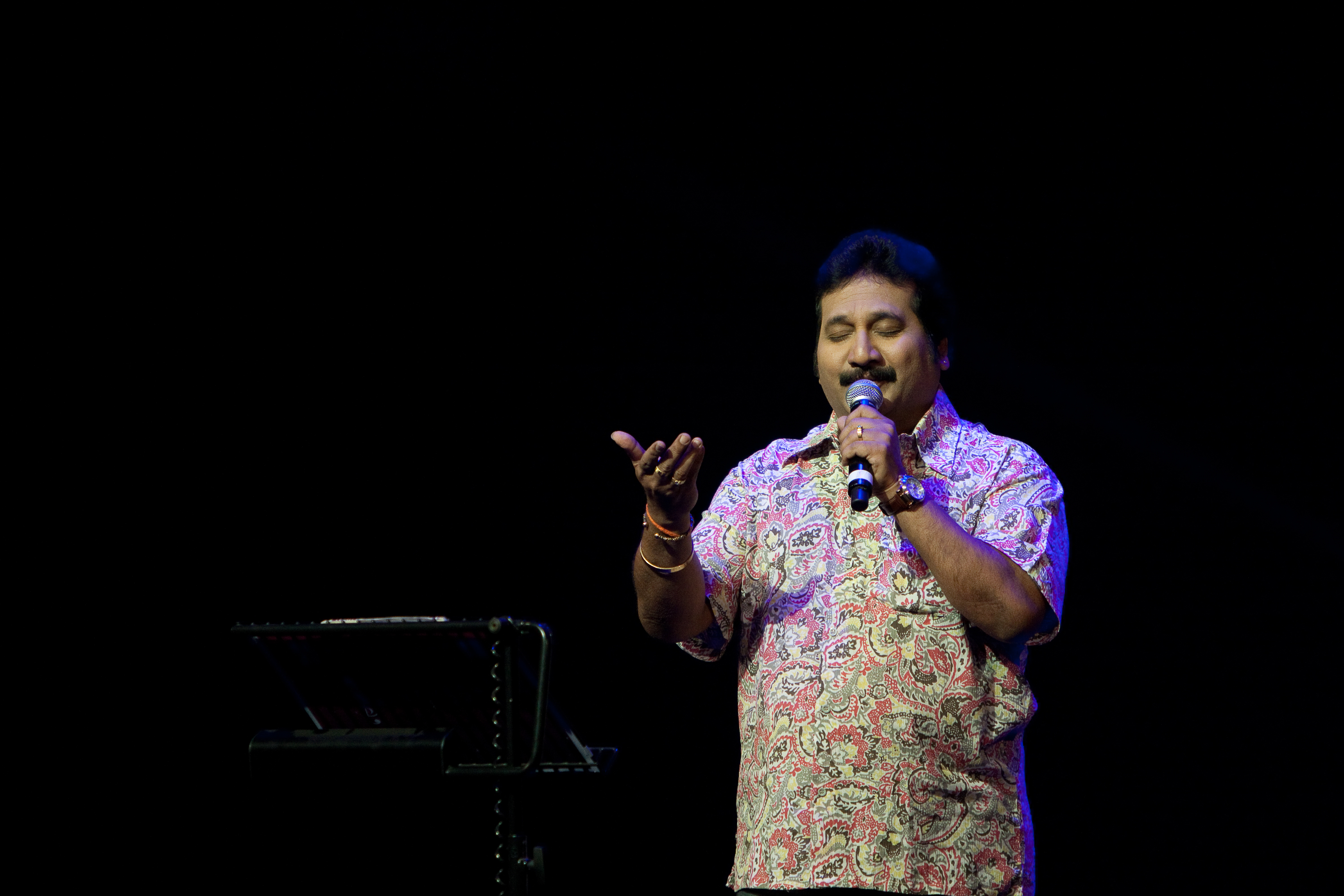
Mano at a concert

He learned Carnatic Music from Nedunuri Krishnamurthy, and acted in a number of stage plays before debuting as an actor, where he acted in 15 films in total, with Rangoon Rowdy being one of them.

His debut as a playback singer was in 1979, when he went to Madras to work with music director M. S. Viswanathan, with whom he worked for 3 years as an assistant.

He worked with director Chakaravarthy in 1982, producing dummy versions of songs, before the actual singers came in to do the recording. In 1984, he worked with S. P. Balasubrahmanyam and Susheela as the song needed a third voice for the film Karpoora Deepam. Shortly thereafter he worked on a hit Kannada film for Hamsalekha, and subsequently sang in a film for Ilaiyaraaja, after which his independent career took off.

It was Ilaiyaraaja who urged him to use the name, Mano, instead of his birth name - Nagoor Babu - as there already was a popular artist by the name of Nagore Hanifa, and this would prevent any mixups.

Taking the criticism in his stride, Mano went on recording as many as 500 songs with Ilaiyaraaja and slowly branched out to sing for other Tamil composers as well.

=== Voice-over dubbing ===
The year 1995 also saw another face of Mano as the voice-over dubbing artist in the Tamil film industry. He dubbed for almost all Rajinikanth starrers in Telugu. His voice became almost synonymous with Rajinikanth and was in great demand by all the directors and producers. He also dubbed for Kamal Haasan in some movies in Telugu.

=== Television works ===
Mano has worked on various television programs, most notably as a judge and host for a variety of singing shows. Notable among them are Super Singer, Super Singer Junior, Star Singer, Pillalu Piduglu (as host), cook with comali season 7 and more.

Mano also hosts Manathodu Mano – a musical talk show on Jaya TV.

== Personal life ==
Mano was born into a Muslim family from Andhra Pradesh. He is married to Jameela in 1985. His son Shakir is an actor and has starred in Naanga (2012).

== Filmography ==
=== As actor ===
Telugu

- 1979: Needa
- 1979: Rangoon Rowdy as Raju
- 1980: Ketugadu
- 1982: O Adadi O Magadu
- 1983: Kalyana Veena
- 1992: Hello Darling
- 1999: Vichithram as Narada
- 2003: Nee Manasu Naaku Telusu as himself
- 2015: Shivam as Tanu's father
- 2021: Crazy Uncles as Reddy

Tamil

- 1991: Sigaram as himself
- 1992: Singaravelan as Mano
- 1993 Porantha Veeda Puguntha Veeda as singer in song "Veettukku Vilakku"
- 2003: Enakku 20 Unakku 18 as himself
- 2014: Vetri Selvan as Ananthakrishnan
- 2023: Single Shankarum Smartphone Simranum as Bhaskaran
- 2025: Kadhalikka Neramillai as Chandramohan
- 2025: Vattakhanal

=== Television ===
year	program	Role	Original language	Notes
2008	Star Singer	Judge	Malayalam	reality show
2009	Super Singer Junior (season 2)	Judge	Tamil	reality show
2011-2012	Super Singer Junior (season 3)	Judge	Tamil	reality show
2013	Pillalu Pidugulu	Host	Telugu	
2013-2014	Super Singer 4	Judge	Tamil	reality show
2014-2015	Super Singer Junior (season 4)	Judge	Tamil	reality show
2015-2016	Super Singer 5	Judge	Tamil	reality show
2016-2017	Super Singer Junior (season 5)	Judge	Tamil	reality show
2019-2023	Jabardasth	Judge	Telugu	reality show
2019-2022	Extra Jabardasth	Judge	Telugu	reality show
2021-2023	Manathodu Mano	Host	Tamil	talk show
2022-2023	Kalyanam Kamaneeyam	Govardhan	Telugu	TV serial
2023-2024	Super Singer Season 10	Judge	Tamil	Reality Show
2024	Super Singer Junior (season 10)	Judge	Tamil	Reality Show

=== As dubbing artist ===
Actor	Film	Original language	Notes
Rajinikanth	Muthu, Arunachalam, Narasimha, Baba, Chandramukhi, Sivaji, Robo, Yamudiki Mogudu, Kochadaiiyaan, Lingaa, Veera, Kabali, Kaala, Petta, Darbar, Peddanna, Jailer, Vettaiyan - The Hunter, Coolie	Tamil	Only for Telugu dubbed versions
Kamal Haasan	Sathi Leelavathi, Brahmachari, Pothuraju, Manmadha Banam	Tamil	Telugu version
Anupam Kher	Little John	Tamil/Hindi/English	Tamil version
Sarath Kumar	Bunny	Telugu	
Akshay Kumar	Galatta Kalyanam	Hindi	Tamil version
Babloo Prithiveeraj	Pelli, Pelli Pandiri	Telugu	
Mammootty	Madhura Raja	Malayalam	Telugu dubbed version

== Discography ==
=== Telugu discography ===
==== 1980s ====
Year	Film	Song	Composer(s)	Writer(s)	Co-singer(s)
1986	Vikram	"Ding Dong"	K. Chakravarthy		
1987	Agni Putrudu	"Yerra Yerrani Bugga"	K. Chakravarthy		
1987	Aha Naa-Pellanta!	"Swagatham"	Ramesh Naidu		
1987	Collector Gari Abbai	"Sannayi Apaku Bava"	K. Chakravarthy		
1987	Gundamma Gari Krishnulu	"How Are You"	K. Chakravarthy		
1987	Gundamma Gari Krishnulu	"Jamale Idi Intele"	K. Chakravarthy		
1987	Gundamma Gari Krishnulu	"Poddu Valapu Vaddu"	K. Chakravarthy		
1987	Gundamma Gari Krishnulu	"Hai Krishna"	K. Chakravarthy		
1987	Kaboye Alludu	"Sai Sai Sara Kotto"	K. Chakravarthy		
1987	Manmadha Leela Kamaraju Gola	"Nannu Cheera Chesuko"	Vasu Rao		
1987	Trimurtulu	"Ee Jeevitham"	Bappi Lahiri		
1987	Trimurtulu	"Bye Bye Bye"	Bappi Lahiri		
1988	Asthulu Anthasthulu	"Thulli Thulli"	Ilaiyaraaja		
1988	Rudraveena	"Randi Randi"	Ilaiyaraaja		
1988	Donga Kollu	"Seethammo Mayammo"	Vasu Rao		
1988	Donga Kollu	"Ravoyi Maayintiki"	Vasu Rao		
1988	Donga Ramudu	"Taku Chiku Taku Chiku"	K. Chakravarthy		
1988	Inspector Pratap	"Takadhim"	K. Chakravarthy		
1988	Jeevana Jyothi	"Samsara Jeevitham"	Raj–Koti		
1988	Jeevana Jyothi	"Muddiche Bulbul Pitta"	Raj–Koti		
1988	Jhansi Rani	"Repo Mapo Pellanta"	K. Chakravarthy		
1988	Raktabhishekam	"Bandaru Chinnadana"	Ilaiyaraaja		
1988	Raktabhishekam	"Cheye Cheye"	Ilaiyaraaja		
1988	Raktha Tilakam	"Guppedu Mallelu"	K. Chakravarthy		
1988	Station Master	"Parugulu Teese"	K. Chakravarthy		
1988	Station Master	"Kottara Chappatlu"	K. Chakravarthy		
1988	Station Master	"Gangolamandi"	K. Chakravarthy		
1988	Yamudiki Mogudu	"Ekku Bendekku Maava"	Raj–Koti		
1989	Siva	"Sarasalu Chalu"	Ilaiyaraaja		S. Janaki
1989	Koduku Diddina Kapuram	"Bahu Paarak O Maharani"	Raj–Koti		
1989	Koduku Diddina Kapuram	"Aalu Ledu"	Raj–Koti		
1989	Paila Pachchees	"Teenage Team Maadi"	Ramesh Vinayakam		
1989	Poola Rangadu	"Yedekokkate"	Raj–Koti		
1989	Poola Rangadu	"Cheerapettu Poolupettu"	Raj–Koti		
1989	Poola Rangadu	"Ottarulaara"	Raj–Koti		
1989	Preminchi Choodu	"Ugaali Gaali Uyyala"	Raj–Koti		
1989	Preminchi Choodu	"Aakasadesana"	Raj–Koti		
1989	Preminchi Choodu	"Kokilamma"	Raj–Koti		
1989	Preminchi Choodu	"Raja Raja"	Raj–Koti		
1989	Sakshi	"Andhamaina Batalaga"	Raj–Koti		
1989	Sakshi	"Jhummani Manasimmani"	Raj–Koti		
1989	Sutradharulu	"Maharaja Rajasri"	K. V. Mahadevan		
1989	Swathi Chinukulu	"Cham Cham Chalaaki"	Ilaiyaraaja		
1989	Swathi Chinukulu	"Ninnu Kanna"	Ilaiyaraaja		
1989	Swathi Chinukulu	"Midisi Midisi Padina Vayasu"	Ilaiyaraaja		
1989	Two Town Rowdy	"Vaddura Niddara"	Raj–Koti		
1989	Vicky Daada	"O Baby Neemeeda"	Raj–Koti		
1989	Vijay	"Ayyayyo Chetilo Dabbulu"	K. Chakravarthy		

==== 1990s ====
Year	Film	Song	Composer(s)	Writer(s)	Co-singer(s)
1990	Dagudumuthala Dampathyam	"Gonthemma"	M. M. Keeravaani		
1990	Dagudumuthala Dampathyam	"Madiloni Mata"	M. M. Keeravaani		
1990	Idem Pellam Baboi	"Darling Darling"	Ilaiyaraaja		
1990	Idem Pellam Baboi	"Godavari Pongalle"	Ilaiyaraaja		
1990	Idem Pellam Baboi	"Rammante Raadaaye"	Ilaiyaraaja		
1990	Kokila	"Thalluku"	Ilaiyaraaja		
1990	Aggiramudu	"Haayile Haayile"	K. Chakravarthy		
1990	Aggiramudu	"Savaal Chestaava"	K. Chakravarthy		
1990	Anna Thammudu	"Oosuponi"	Raj–Koti		
1990	Anna Thammudu	"Puttu Puttu Aa"	Raj–Koti		
1990	Anna Thammudu	"Kadupaara"	Raj–Koti		
1990	Chevilo Puvvu	"Doraka Doraka"	K. Chakravarthy		
1990	Iddaru Iddare	"Abbayilu Cheppana"	Raj–Koti		
1990	Kodama Simham	"Gum Gumainchu"	Raj–Koti		
1990	Kodama Simham	"Pillo Jaabillo"	Raj–Koti		
1990	Mama Alludu	"Edi Manmadha Samrajyam"	Vasu Rao		
1990	Mama Alludu	"Mangalyam Tantunanena"	Vasu Rao		
1990	Mama Alludu	"Gundelo Gusagusalu"	Vasu Rao		
1990	Mama Alludu	"Seetapati Chapegathi"	Vasu Rao		
1990	Mama Alludu	"Mama Alludu"	Vasu Rao		
1990	Master Kapuram	"Mallelo Manchamesuko"	Raj–Koti		
1990	Master Kapuram	"Neeve Prema Neede Prema"	Raj–Koti		
1990	Prananiki Pranam	"Eeshwar Alla Terenaam"	K. Chakravarthy		
1990	Prema Zindabad	"Anandam Ajantha"	Madhavapeddi Suresh		
1990	Rambha Rambabu	"Rambha Ramba"	Madhavapeddi Suresh		
1990	Rambha Rambabu	"Balamani Raave"	Madhavapeddi Suresh		
1991	Sathruvu	"Maata Vintara"	Raj–Koti		
1991	Amma Rajinama	"Cheekatlo Aadapilla"	K. Chakravarthy		
1991	Dalpathi	"Muddabanthi Poochenule"	Ilaiyaraaja		
1991	Nirnayam	"Mila Mila Merisenu"	Ilaiyaraaja		
1991	Pandirimancham	"Chilakamma Paluku"	Raj–Koti		
1991	Pandirimancham	"Pillo Pidugo"	Raj–Koti		
1991	Pandirimancham	"Rowdygaaru"	Raj–Koti		
1991	Pandirimancham	"Amma Nee"	Raj–Koti		
1991	Stuartpuram Police Station	"Fantastic"	Ilaiyaraaja		
1991	Parishkaram	"Kanya Kumarini"	Vidyasagar		
1991	Parishkaram	"Chemanthi Chempalo"	Vidyasagar		
1991	Parishkaram	"Illantha Uyyalavuthundi"	Vidyasagar		
1991	Kshana Kshanam	"Jumbaare"	M. M. Keeravaani		
1991	April 1 Vidudala	"Chukkalu Temmanna"	Ilaiyaraaja		
1991	April 1 Vidudala	"Nijamante"	Ilaiyaraaja		
1991	Teneteega	"Gitcham Gitcham"	Vidyasagar		
1992	Allari Pilla	"Bhale Chance"	Vidyasagar		
1992	Allari Pilla	"Alakalaku Laalijo"	Vidyasagar		
1992	Allari Pilla	"Inta Inta"	Vidyasagar		
1992	Antham	"Oohalevo Regey"	R. D. Burman		
1992	Asadhyulu	"Kanapade Daarilo"	Ilaiyaraaja		
1992	Chittemma Mogudu	"Hello Hello Lady Doctor"	K. V. Mahadevan		
1992	Chittemma Mogudu	"Boddulo Rupayibilla"	K. V. Mahadevan		
1992	Killer	"Priya Priyathama"	Ilaiyaraaja		
1992	Roja	"Vinara Vinara"	A. R. Rahman		
1992	Dharma Kshetram	"Kora Meenu Komalam"	Ilaiyaraaja		
1992	Sahasam	"Sahasam"	M. M. Keeravaani		
1992	Gharana Mogudu	"Kitukulu Thelisina"	M. M. Keeravaani		
1992	Gharana Mogudu	"Hey Pilla Hello Pilla"	M. M. Keeravaani		
1992	Golmaal Govindam	"Yem Tapamo"	K. Chakravarthy		
1992	Mother India	"Lajja Gummadi"	K. Chakravarthy		
1992	Pellaniki Premalekha Priyuraliki Subhalekha	"Kannugotti Raa"	J. V. Raghavulu		
1993	Bangaru Bullodu	"Thathiginathom"	Raj–Koti		
1993	Donga Donga	"Veera Bobbili"	A. R. Rahman		
1993	Donga Donga	"Kotha Bangaru"	A. R. Rahman		
1993	Donga Donga	"Kanulu Kanulanu"	A. R. Rahman		
1993	Kondapalli Raja	"Guvvamgudug"	M. M. Keeravaani		
1993	Kondapalli Raja	"Ammamma"	M. M. Keeravaani		
1993	Money	"Paadu Kaburu"	Sri Kommineni		
1993	Padmavyuham	"July Maasam"	A. R. Rahman		
1993	Aadarsam	"Lavva Lakidi Laati"	M. M. Keeravaani		
1993	Aadarsam	"Eedu Korinadi"	M. M. Keeravaani		
1993	Aadarsam	"Chikati Musirina"	M. M. Keeravaani		
1993	Gaayam	"Nizam Pori"	Sri Kommineni		
1993	Gaayam	"Cheli Mida Chitikedu"	Sri Kommineni		
1993	Major Chandrakanth	"Neekkavalisindi"	M. M. Keeravaani		
1993	Mutha Mestri	"Chickchick Cham"	Raj–Koti		
1993	Pillalu Diddina Kapuram	"Mangala Gowri"	Vidyasagar		
1993	Pillalu Diddina Kapuram	"Malakpeta Pori"	Vidyasagar		
1994	Parugo Parugu	"Kindaninchi Paiki"	Raj–Koti		
1994	Alibaba Aradajanu Dongalu	"Nee Paita Jaripothe"	Vidyasagar		
1994	Allarodu	"Teacher Teacher"	Vidyasagar		
1994	Allarodu	"Sarangaa Srirangaa"	Vidyasagar		
1994	Allarodu	"Vakitlo Chali Chali"	Vidyasagar		
1994	Allarodu	"Agadha Allari Vaana"	Vidyasagar		
1994	Bhale Pellam	"Maapatela Mallelabasthi"	Deva		
1994	Bobbili Simham	"Maayadaari Pillada"	M. M. Keeravaani		
1994	Captain	"Paaliyyave Hai"	Sirpy		
1994	Lucky Chance	"Aaja Aaja Raja"	Sri Kommineni		
1994	Lucky Chance	"Vudutha Vudutha Huch"	Sri Kommineni		
1994	Madam	"Navallakaadu"	Madhavapeddi Suresh		
1994	Mugguru Monagallu	"Aaja Aaja"	Vidyasagar		
1994	Palnati Pourusham	"Raagala Chilaka"	A. R. Rahman		
1994	Palnati Pourusham	"Idigo Peddapuram"	A. R. Rahman		
1994	Super Police	"Teku Kuttina Tenalilo"	A. R. Rahman		
1994	Super Police	"Mukkambe Mukkambe"	A. R. Rahman		
1994	Gangmaster	"Nagu Monu Nagma"	A. R. Rahman		
1994	Gangmaster	"Baddaragiri"	A. R. Rahman		
1994	Gangmaster	"Kila Kilala"	A. R. Rahman		
1994	Gangmaster	"Aa Siggu Eggu Enthavaraku"	A. R. Rahman		
1994	Vanitha	"Koodu Pettebhoomi"	A. R. Rahman		
1994	Premikudu	"Mukkala Mukkabula"	A. R. Rahman	Rajasri	Swarnalatha
1994	Aladdin	"A Whole New World"(Reprise)	Alan Menken		
1994	Aladdin	"Prince Ali"	Alan Menken		
1994	Aladdin	"Friend Like Me"	Alan Menken		
1994	Aladdin	"One Jump Ahead"(Reprise)	Alan Menken		
1994	Aladdin	"One Jump Ahead"	Alan Menken		
1994	Aladdin	"A Whole New World"	Alan Menken		
1995	Vaddu Bava Thappu	"My Dear Maradaluji"	Vidyasagar		
1995	Vaddu Bava Thappu	"O Prema Sastri"	Vidyasagar		
1995	Vaddu Bava Thappu	"Orayyo Yo Yo"	Vidyasagar		
1995	Tapassu	"Talukumannadi Kulukula Tara" "Nuvvante Nenani"	Raj–Koti		
1995	Om	"College Kumaru" "Mehbooba" "Amruthavanthe Premada"	Hamsalekha		
1995	Aayanaki Iddaru	"Arera Kothaga Undiro"	Koti		
1995	Muthu	"Thillana Thillana"	A. R. Rahman		
1995	Money Money	"Em Kompa"	Sri Kommineni		
1995	Ammoru	"Dandalu"	Sri Kommineni		
1995	Ammoru	"Emani Piluvanu"	Sri Kommineni		
1995	Rangeli	"Yemi Cheyavachu"	A. R. Rahman		
1995	Big Boss	"Sudiki Daaram"	Bappi Lahiri		
1995	Gharana Bullodu	"Vangi Vangi"	M. M. Keeravaani		
1995	Gharana Bullodu	"Emkasi Emkasi"	M. M. Keeravaani		
1995	Gharana Bullodu	"Adirendiro"	M. M. Keeravaani		
1995	Gharana Bullodu	"Chukkalo"	M. M. Keeravaani		
1995	Maato Pettukoku	"Maaghamaasam"	Madhavapeddi Suresh		
1995	Maato Pettukoku	""Mazare Gajjala"	Madhavapeddi Suresh		
1995	Maato Pettukoku	"Ammamte Elelo"	Madhavapeddi Suresh		
1995	Maya Bazaar	"Tholi Valapula"	Madhavapeddi Suresh		
1995	Mummy Mee Aayanochadu	"Dhintanana Vennela Chilaka"	Vidyasagar		
1995	Mummy Mee Aayanochadu	"Chali Gaali Chengu Chaatu"	Vidyasagar		
1995	Mummy Mee Aayanochadu	"Gampalo Kodenta"	Vidyasagar		
1995	Mummy Mee Aayanochadu	"Maharani Manjulavani"	Vidyasagar		
1995	Mummy Mee Aayanochadu	"Hye Hye Madana"	Vidyasagar		
1995	Sisindri	"Ori Naayano"	Raj		
1995	Sisindri	"Kya Scene Hai"	Raj		
1995	Gulabi	"Meghalalo"	Shashi Preetam		
1996	Akkada Ammayi Ikkada Abbayi	"Chaligali Jummandi"	Koti		
1996	Deyyam	"Alli Billi Kurra Cheera"	Vishwanatha Sathyanarayana		
1996	Deyyam	"Ee Kulasaala Gulabi"	Vishwanatha Sathyanarayana		
1996	Deyyam	"Hello Hello O Missu"	Vishwanatha Sathyanarayana		
1996	Love Birds	"Come On Come On"	A. R. Rahman		
1996	Little Soldiers	"Maa Father O Tiger"	Sri Kommineni		
1996	Little Soldiers	"Yevadandi Veedu"	Sri Kommineni		
1996	Prema Desam	"Vennela Vennela"	A. R. Rahman		
1996	Prema Desam	"College Style"	A. R. Rahman		
1996	Family	"Aalumagalu"	Prasanna Swaraj		
1996	Family	"Cheeraleni Sundarangeevi"	Prasanna Swaraj		
1996	Family	"Kothapelli Koothuru"	Prasanna Swaraj		
1996	Intlo Illalu Vantintlo Priyuralu	"Paapato Pap"	Koti		
1996	Intlo Illalu Vantintlo Priyuralu	"Olammi Timmirekkinde"	Koti		
1996	Jabilamma Pelli	"Boddupai Vadanam"	M. M. Keeravaani		
1996	Ladies Doctor	"O Aakashavaani"	Vidyasagar		
1996	Ladies Doctor	"Chali Gaali Chengu Chaatu"	Vidyasagar		
1996	Ladies Doctor	"Yennenno Nomu"	Vidyasagar		
1996	Pavitra Bandham	"O My Daddy"	M. M. Keeravaani		
1996	Rayudugaru Nayudugaru	"Naa Kantiki Choopuvu"	M. M. Keeravaani		
1996	Rayudugaru Nayudugaru	"Monna Choopu Kalisindi"	M. M. Keeravaani		
1996	Sahasa Veerudu Sagara Kanya	"Pettamandi Pettamandi"	M. M. Keeravaani		
1996	Topi Raja Sweety Roja	"Alluku Pora"	Rajendra Prasad		
1997	Aaro Pranam	"Pedaviki Pedavi"	Veeru K		
1997	Aaro Pranam	"Makhana"	Veeru K		
1997	Devudu	"Ra Chilaka Kulukula"	Sirpy		
1997	Devudu	"Tanantu Nanu"	Sirpy		
1997	Devudu	"Made in China"	Sirpy		
1997	Devudu	"Gullo Ramayyo"	Sirpy		
1997	Dongaata	"O Priya Edo Tamasha"	Ramani Bharadwaj		
1997	Dongaata	"Lallaguda Sahiti Mallesha"	Ramani Bharadwaj		
1997	Egire Paavurama	"This Is The Rhythm"	S. V. Krishna Reddy		
1997	Gokulamlo Seeta	"Andala Sermaloni"	Koti		
1997	Gokulamlo Seeta	"Hey Papa"	Koti		
1997	Hitler	"Koosindi Kanne"	Koti		
1997	Hitler	"Prema Johar"	Koti		
1997	Jai Bajarangabhali	"Nee Lipstick Pedavulu"	Koti		
1997	Jai Bajarangabhali	"Ghallu Ghallu"	Koti		
1997	Jai Bajarangabhali	"O Sokula Diamond Rani"	Koti		
1997	Mama Bagunnava	"Chinnari Cheekatela"	Vidyasagar		
1997	Merupu Kalalu	"Strawberry Kanne"	A. R. Rahman		
1997	Anaganaga Oka Roju	"Ema Kopama"	Sri Kommineni		
1997	Anaganaga Oka Roju	"Edo Taha Taha"	Sri Kommineni		
1997	Anaganaga Oka Roju	"Love Is Blind"	Sri Kommineni		
1997	Anaganaga Oka Roju	"Oopa Lenayyo"	Sri Kommineni		
1997	Anaganaga Oka Roju	"Endhammo"	Sri Kommineni		
1997	Iddaru	"Adhukonadam"	A. R. Rahman		
1997	Iddaru	"Odalu Mannata"	A. R. Rahman		
1997	Annamayya	"Padaharu Kalalaku"	M. M. Keeravaani		
1997	Annamayya	"Sobhaname Sobhaname"	M. M. Keeravaani		
1997	Annamayya	"Asmadeeya"	M. M. Keeravaani		
1997	Annamayya	"Nanati Bathuku"	M. M. Keeravaani		
1997	Oka Chinna Maata	"Abbo Oyabbo"	Ramani Bharadwaj		
1997	Omkaram	"College Kurrodu"	Hamsalekha		
1997	Omkaram	"Bullemma"	Hamsalekha		
1997	Osey Ramulamma	"Addalori Buddayya"	Vandemataram Srinivas		
1997	Maa Aayana Bangaram	"Chummare Chumma"	Vandemataram Srinivas		
1997	Maa Aayana Bangaram	"Bul Bul Basthi Lady"	Vandemataram Srinivas		
1997	Pelli	"Rukku Rukku Rukkumini"	S. A. Rajkumar		
1997	Pelli Chesukundam	"O Laila Laila"	Koti		
1997	Preminchukundam Raa	"Pellikala Vachesinde"	Mani Sharma		
1997	Preminchukundam Raa	"O Panaipothundi"	Mani Sharma		
1997	Subhakankshalu	"Panchavannela Chilaka"	Koti		
1997	Surya Putrulu	"Peesu Peesu Polisu"	M. M. Keeravaani		
1997	Thaali	"Guppu Guppu Ghallumandi"	Vidyasagar		
1997	Veedevadandi Babu	"Rama Hey Rama"	Sirpy		
1997	Veedevadandi Babu	"Chamak Chamak"	Sirpy		
1997	Veedevadandi Babu	"Chitti Chitti Guvvapilla"	Sirpy		
1997	Veedevadandi Babu	"I Love You Love You"	Sirpy		
1997	Veedevadandi Babu	"O Cheele Cheele"	Sirpy		
1997	Veedevadandi Babu	"Aoura Laila"	Sirpy		
1997	Ugadi	"Brathukaina Neede Kada"	S. V. Krishna Reddy		
1998	Pelli Pandiri	"Dosth Mera Dosth"	Vandemataram Srinivas		
1998	All-rounder	"Golkonda Chowrastha"	Swaraveenapani		
1998	Bavagaru Bagunnara?	"Chalnedo Gaadi"	Mani Sharma		
1998	Bavagaru Bagunnara?	"Sorry Sorry"	Mani Sharma		
1998	Daddy Daddy	"Jaangri Lanti Pilla"	Vandemataram Srinivas		
1998	Ganesh	"Aadabarse"	Mani Sharma		
1998	Ganesh	"Hindilona Chumma"	Mani Sharma		
1998	Prematho	"O Priyathama"	A. R. Rahman		
1998	Mee Aayana Jagratha	"Vaana Vaana"	Koti		
1998	Mee Aayana Jagratha	"Andam Debba Kottinde"	Koti		
1998	Mee Aayana Jagratha	"Naa Holi Rangeli"	Vinayak Rao		
1998	Mee Aayana Jagratha	"Tyte Jeans Vesi"	Vinayak Rao		
1998	Antahpuram	"Chhamaku Chhamaku"	Ilaiyaraaja		
1998	Navvulata	"Chik Chikladki"	M. M. Srilekha		
1998	Navvulata	"Eevela Anividala"	M. M. Srilekha		
1998	Pandaga	"Bagundammo"	M. M. Keeravaani		
1998	Pandaga	"Mudda Banthulu"	M. M. Keeravaani		
1998	Pelli Peetalu	"Pelli Peetalu"	S. V. Krishna Reddy		
1998	Premante Idera	"Nizam Babulu"	Ramana Gogula		
1998	Sri Sita Ramula Kalyanam Chootamu Raarandi	"Evamma Computeramma"	M. M. Keeravaani		
1998	Suryavamsam	"Chukkalanni"(Version ll)	S. A. Rajkumar		
1998	Suswagatham	"Happy Happy"	S. A. Rajkumar		
1998	Suswagatham	"Figure Maata"	S. A. Rajkumar		
1998	Ulta Palta	"Chamaku Chamaku"	M. M. Srilekha		
1998	Ulta Palta	"Kashmirunundi Kanyakumari"	M. M. Srilekha		
1998	Ulta Palta	"Rajamandri Ramba"	M. M. Srilekha		
1998	W/o V. Vara Prasad	"Peru Cheppave Papa"	M. M. Keeravaani		
1999	Harischandraa	"Muvva Gopala"	Aghosh		
1999	Harischandraa	"Premante Thenela"	Aghosh		
1999	Harischandraa	"Chinna Saayam Cheyaana"	Aghosh		
1999	Harischandraa	"Vinudu Vinudu Antha"	Aghosh		
1999	Naa Hrudayamlo Nidurinche Cheli	"Ninne Premincha"	Sri Kommineni		
1999	Naa Hrudayamlo Nidurinche Cheli	"Ayyo Ayyo"	Sri Kommineni		
1999	Preminche Manasu	"Mumbai Minku Bangaru"	S. A. Rajkumar		Swarnalatha
1999	Preminche Manasu	"Maaloni Maata Paata Aata"	S. A. Rajkumar		
1999	Neeli Meghalu	"Punnami Vennelaki"	Duggiraala		
1999	Nee Kosam	"Konte Baapu"	Devi Sri Prasad		
1999	Preminchedi Endukamma	"Manasu Koyila Paata"	Ilaiyaraaja		
1999	Prema Katha	"Sunday Sunday"	Sandeep Chowta		
1999	Premaku Velayera	"Inter Chadive"	S. V. Krishna Reddy		
1999	Chinni Chinni Aasa	"Mallepulla Jallule"	Raj		
1999	Chinni Chinni Aasa	"Aa Vankachusuko"	Raj		
1999	Narasimha	"Kikku Ekkele"	A. R. Rahman		
1999	Ravoyi Chandamama	"Naa Kosmae"	Mani Sharma		
1999	Raja	"Mallela Vaana"	S. A. Rajkumar		
1999	Samarasimha Reddy	"Lady Lady"	Mani Sharma		
1999	Samarasimha Reddy	"Adees Abbabba"	Mani Sharma		
1999	Iddaru Mitrulu	"Nootokka Jillalo"	Mani Sharma		
1999	Speed Dancer	"Janedo Janedo"	Ramesh Vinayakam		
1999	Speed Dancer	"Meethali Meethali Hai"	Ramesh Vinayakam		
1999	Speed Dancer	"Hai Ooru Vaada"	Ramesh Vinayakam		
1999	Speed Dancer	"Andhra Jyothi Choosa"	Ramesh Vinayakam		
1999	Speed Dancer	"Dikkulne Dee Kotte"	Ramesh Vinayakam		
1999	Sneham Kosam	"Ayyagaru Avunandi"	S. A. Rajkumar		
1999	Jodi	"Andhala Jeeva"	A. R. Rahman		
1999	Sultan	"Aakasham Gundello"	Koti		
1999	Sultan	"Chima Chima"	Koti		
1999	Swayamvaram	"Pellichesukora"	Vandemataram Srinivas		
1999	Yamajathakudu	"Nee Chevulaki"	Vandemataram Srinivas		

==== 2000s ====
Year	Film	Song	Composer(s)	Writer(s)	Co-singer(s)
2000	Choosoddaam Randi	"Emani Cheppanuraa"	M. M. Keeravaani		
2000	Manasunna Maaraju	"Oodala Oodala"	Vandemataram Srinivas		Sujatha Mohan, Malgudi Subha, Tippu
2000	Maa Annayya	"Thajaga Maa Intlo"	S. A. Rajkumar		K. S. Chithra, Sujatha Mohan
2000	Kshemamga Velli Labhamga Randi	"Aadavallamandi Memu"	Vandemataram Srinivas		K. S. Chithra
2000	Bachi	"Habibi"	Chakri	Kulashekar	Gopika Poornima, Usha
2000	Moodu Mukkalaata	"Chinavaada Chinavaada"	M. M. Srilekha	Chandrabose	Nithyasree Mahadevan
2001	Narasimha Naidu	"Chilakapacha Koka"	Mani Sharma	Bhuvana Chandra	Radhika
2001	Soori	"Kottu Kottu Tenkaaya"	Vidyasagar	Kaluva Krishna Sai	
2001	Soori	"Gumma Saradaaga"	Vidyasagar	Kaluva Krishna Sai	Sujatha Mohan
2001	Kushi	"Holi Holi"	Mani Sharma	Suddala Ashok Teja	Swarnalatha
2001	Hanuman Junction	"Golumaalu Golumaalu"	Suresh Peters	Veturi Sundararamurty	K. S. Chithra, M. G. Sreekumar
2001	Subbu	"Janani Janma Bhoomi"	Mani Sharma	Jaladi	
2001	Subbu	"Hari Hara"	Mani Sharma	Kulashekar	Sunitha
2001	Naalo Unna Prema	"O Naa Priyathama"	Koti		K. S. Chithra
2002	Seema Simham	"Pori Hoosharu"	Mani Sharma		
2003	Raghavendra	"Boothulu Tittakuraa"	Mani Sharma		
2003	Vijayam	"Ee Ooji Sunoji"	Koti		
2003	Simhadri	"Chinnadame"	M. M. Keeravaani		
2003	Gangotri	"Maavayyadi"	M. M. Keeravaani		
2003	Kalyana Ramudu	"Parigetti Pothundi"	Mani Sharma		
2003	Tagore	"Gappuchippu"	Mani Sharma		
2003	Palnati Brahmanayudu	"Palaka Balapam"	Mani Sharma		
2004	Puttintiki Ra Chelli	"Seethakoka Chilakala Chelli"	S. A. Rajkumar		
2004	Swarabhishekam	"Nee Chente Oka"	Vidyasagar	Sirivennela Sitaramasastry	K. S. Chithra
2004	Shankar Dada M.B.B.S.	"Shankar Dada M.B.B.S"	Devi Sri Prasad		
2004	Mass	"Maama Mass"	Devi Sri Prasad		
2004	Samba	"Kita Kitalu Pettamaaku"	Mani Sharma		
2005	Naa Alludu	"Pilla Choodu"(Film Version)	Devi Sri Prasad		
2006	Style	"Chiru Cheyyesthe"	Mani Sharma		
2007	Shankar Dada Zindabad	"Jagadeka Veerudiki"	Devi Sri Prasad		
2007	Yamadonga	"Young Yama"	M. M. Keeravaani		
2007	Yamadonga	"Srikara Karunda"	M. M. Keeravaani		
2007	Yamadonga	"Bambharala Chumbhanala"	M. M. Keeravaani		
2008	Gorintaku	"Rajugari Thotalona"	S. A. Rajkumar		
2008	Gorintaku	"Karuna Kuriyu"	S. A. Rajkumar		
2008	Krishnarjuna	"Pedda Marrikemo"	M. M. Keeravaani		
2009	Billa	"Hariloranga Hari"	Mani Sharma		

==== 2010s ====
Year	Film	Song	Composer(s)	Writer(s)	Co-singer(s)	Notes
2010	Simha	"Simhamanti"	Chakri	Chandrabose	Sravana Bhargavi	
2010	Panchakshari	"Nagendra Haraya"	Chinna			
2013	Iddarammayilatho	"Shankara Bharanamtho"	Devi Sri Prasad			
2013	Gundello Godari	"Ekkadundi Ekkadundi"	Ilaiyaraaja			
2013	2014	Amrutham Chandamamalo	"Bahuparak", "Yarukaga"	Shree		
Lingaa	2014	"Mona Mona"	A. R. Rahman			Dubbed version
2017	Gayatri	"Ravana Bramha"	S. Thaman			
2019	Petta	"Mass Maranam"	Anirudh Ravichander			Dubbed version
2019	Kurukshetram	"Jhumma Jhumma"	V. Harikrishna			
2019	Kurukshetram	"Bharata Vamshaja"	V. Harikrishna			
2019	The Lion King	"Siddhama"	Hans Zimmer			Dubbed version

==== 2020s ====
Year	Film	Song	Composer(s)	Writer(s)	Co-singer(s)
2023	Veera Simha Reddy	"Mass Mogudu"	S. Thaman	Ramajogayya Sastry	Ramya Behara
2024	Pekamedalu	"Boom Boom Lacchanna"	Smaran	Bhargava Karthik	
2024	Veeranjaneyulu Viharayatra	"AyyAyyo"	RH Vikram	Sanapati Bharadwaj Patrudu	
2024	Swag	"Guvva Gootilo"	Vivek Sagar	Bhuvana Chandra	Geetha Madhuri, Snigdha Sharma
2024	Keshava Chandra Ramavath	"Telangana Tejam"	Charan Arjun	Goreti Venkanna	Goreti Venkanna, Kalpana, Veeha, Charan Arjun
2025	Patang	"Oh Ranga"	Jose Jimmy	Praneeth Prattipati	

=== Tamil discography ===
==== 1980s ====
Year	Film	Song	Composer(s)	Writer(s)	Co-singer(s)
1986	Poovizhi Vasalile	"Anne Anne"	Ilaiyaraaja	Ilaiyaraaja	
1987	Velaikkaran	"Velai Illadhavan"	Ilaiyaraaja		
1987	Velaikkaran	"Vaa Vaa Kanna"	Ilaiyaraaja		K. S. Chithra
1987	Enga Ooru Pattukaran	"Shenbagame Shenbagame"	Ilaiyaraaja		
1987	Enga Ooru Pattukaran	"Pechi Pechi"	Ilayaraja		
1987	Enga Ooru Pattukaran	"Jinjinaku Janakku"	Ilayaraja		
1987	Enga Ooru Pattukaran	"Madurai Marikozhundhu"	Ilayaraja		
1987	Nayakan	"Nee Oru Kaadhal"	Ilayaraja	K. S. Chithra	
1988	Soora Samhaaram	"Vedhalam Vandhirukuthu"	Ilayaraja		
1988	Guru Sishyan	"Jingidi Jingidi"	Ilayaraja		
1988	Solla Thudikuthu Manasu	"Thenmozhi"	Ilayaraja		
1988	En Jeevan Paduthu	"Mounam Yen"	Ilayaraja		
1988	Ennai Vittu Pogaathe	"Vaalaattum"	Ilayaraja		
1988	Raasave Unnai Nambi	"Raasathi Manasula"	Ilayaraja	P. Susheela	
1988	Poonthotta Kaavalkaaran	"Paaramal Partha Nenjam"	Ilayaraja	Gangai Amaran	K. S. Chithra
1989	En Purushanthaan Enakku Mattumthaan	"Kaathu Kaathu"			
1989	Karakattakkaran	"Kudagu Malai"	Ilayaraja		
1989	Karakattakkaran	"Mundhi Mundhi"	Ilayaraja		
1989	Paandi Nattu Thangam	Un Manasila Paatuthaan	Ilayaraja	Gangai Amaran	K. S. Chithra
1989	Rajadhi Raja	"Meenamma"	Ilayaraja		
1989	Rajadhi Raja	"Malayala Karaiyoram"	Ilayaraja		
1989	Rajadhi Raja	"Enkitta Modhathe"	Ilayaraja		
1989	Rajadhi Raja	"Vaa Vaa Manjal"	Ilayaraja		
1989	Raja Chinna Roja	"Poo Poopol manam"	Illaiyaraaja		K. S. Chithra

==== 1990s ====
Year	Film	Song	Composer(s)	Writer(s)	Co-singer(s)
1990	Paattukku Naan Adimai	"Thaalattu Ketkaatha"			
1990	Kavalukku Kettikaran	"Idhazenum"			
1990	Kavalukku Kettikaran	"Solai Ilanguyil"			
1990	Amman Kovil Thiruvizha	"Naan Sonnal"			
1990	Panakkaran	"Nooru Varusham"			
1990	Arangetra Velai	"Gundu Onnu"			
1991	Sami Potta Mudichu	"Ponneduthu"	Ilaiyaraaja	Gangai Amaran	K. S. Chithra
1991	Eeramana Rojave	"Adho Mega Oorvalam"	Ilaiyaraaja	Pulamaipithan	Sunanda
1992	Chembaruthi	"Nila Kayum"		Vaali	S. Janaki
1992	Thanga Manasukkaran	"Manikuyil Isaikkuthadi"	Ilaiyaraaja	Piraisoodan	
1992	Thanga Manasukkaran	"Paatukulle Pattu"	Ilaiyaraaja	Kamakodian	S Janaki
1992	Thanga Manasukkaran	"Poothathu Poonthoppu"	Ilaiyaraaja	Gangai Amaran	S Janaki
1992	Thanga Manasukkaran	"Udakkachatham"	Ilaiyaraaja	Gangai Amaran	
1992	Thanga Manasukkaran	"Maaney Mayanguvathu"	Ilaiyaraaja	Piraisoodan	
1993	Uzhaippali	"Uzhaippali Illatha"	Ilaiyaraaja	Vaali	
1993	Uzhaippali	"Oru Maina Maina Kuruvi"	Ilaiyaraaja	Vaali	K. S. Chithra
1993	Kizhakku Cheemayile	Aathangara Marame	A. R. Rahman	Vairamuthu	Sujatha
1993	Ponnumani	"Aadi Pattam"	Ilaiyaraaja	R. V. Udayakumar	
1993	Senthoorapandi	"Chinna Chinna Sethi Solli"	Deva	Vaali	Swarnalatha
1994	Kaadhalan	"Mukabala"	A.R.Rahman	Vaali	Swarnalatha
1995	Ellame En Rasathan	"Azhagana Manja Pura"			K. S. Chithra
1996	Ullathai Allitha	All songs	Sirpy		
1997	Nerukku Ner	"Thudikindra Kadhal"	Deva		Bhavatharini
1997	Suryavamsam	"Natchathira Jannalil"	S. A. Rajkumar	Mu. Metha	Sunandha
1998	Aval Varuvala	"Rukku Rukku"	S. A. Rajkumar		
1999	Unnai Thedi	"Oyila Oyila"	Deva		
1999	Minsara Kanna	Boy Frienda	Deva		
1999	Minsara Kanna	Oh Uncle	Deva		
1999	Padayappa	Kick Erudhe	A. R. Rahman		
1999	Ninaivirukkum Varai	Thirupathi Ezhumalai	Deva		

==== 2000s ====
Year	Film	Song	Composer(s)
2000	Kadhal Rojave	Chinna Vennila	Ilayaraja
2000	Vaanathaippola	Rojapoo Maalaiyile	S. A. Rajkumar
2000	Eazhaiyin Sirippil	Yappa Yappa Ayyappa	Deva
2000	Eazhaiyin Sirippil	Pacha Kallu Mookuthi	Deva
2000	Thai Porandachu	Gopala Gopala	Deva
2000	Kakkai Siraginile	Nenavu Therinja	Ilayaraja
2000	Rajakali Amman	Kalyanam Thevaiyillai	S. A. Rajkumar
2000	James Pandu	Nikkatuma Nadakatuma	S. A. Rajkumar
2000	Kandha Kadamba Kathirvela	Kandha Kadamba	S. A. Rajkumar
2000	Kandha Kadamba Kathirvela	Nalla paasamulla	S. A. Rajkumar
2001	Vinnukum Mannukum	Paasamulla Sooriyane	Sirpy
2001	Ullam Kollai Poguthae	Kingda	Karthik Raja
2009	Aadhavan	Maasi Maasi	Harris Jayaraj

==== 2010s ====
Year	Film	Song	Composer(s)	Writer(s)	Co-singer(s)	Notes
2011	Rajapattai	"Villathi Villain"	Yuvan Shankar Raja			
2011	Mankatha	"Machi Open the Bottle"	Yuvan Shankar Raja			
2014	Lingaa	Mona Gasolina	A. R. Rahman			
2015	Puli	Puli Puli	Devi Sri Prasad			
2016	Kadhalum Kadandhu Pogum	"Akkam Pakkam Paar"	Santhosh Narayanan	Thamarai	Santhosh Narayanan	

=== Malayalam discography ===
Year	Film	Song	Writer(s)	Composer(s)	Co-singer(s)	Notes
1992	Manyanmar	Theeratha Dahamo	Chunakkara Ramankutty	SP Venkitesh	K.S.Chitra	
1992	Soorya Manasam	Kanil Nila	Kaithapra	MM Keeravani		
1994	Sainyam	Mercury	Shibu Chakravarthy	SP Venkitesh	Malgudi Subha, Sujatha Mohan	
1994	Sainyam	Baggy Jeans	Shibu Chakravarthy	SP Venkitesh	Krishnachandran	
1994	Manathe Vellitheru	Moovanthi	Shibu Chakravarthy	Johnson	Malgudi Subha	
1994	Sopanam	Nagumomu	Thyagaraja	SP Venkitesh		

=== Kannada discography ===
Year	Film	Song	Composer(s)	Writer(s)	Co-singer(s)	Notes
1986	Brahma Vishnu Maheshwara	"Chinna Naale Chinnu"	Vijayanand		K. S. Chithra	
1991	Ramachaari	"Yaarivalu"	Hamsalekha			
1991	Ramachaari	"Aakashadaage"	Hamsalekha			
1991	Ramachaari	"Burude Burude"	Hamsalekha			
1995	Om	"College Kumaru"	Hamsalekha			
1995	Om	"Amruthavanthe"	Hamsalekha			
1995	Om	"Mehbooba"	Hamsalekha			
1995	Putnanja	"Puttamalli"	Hamsalekha			
1995	Putnanja	"Nammamma"	Hamsalekha			
1995	Putnanja	"Haadiro"	Hamsalekha			
1995	Putnanja	"Naanu Putnanja"	Hamsalekha			
1995	Putnanja	"Dasara Gombe"	Hamsalekha			
1996	Shiva Sainya	"O Mere Pyare"	Ilaiyaraaja		K. S. Chithra	
1996	Shiva Sainya	"Are Laila Laila"	Ilaiyaraaja			
1996	Shiva Sainya	"Raja Namma"	Ilaiyaraaja			
1996	Shiva Sainya	"Jailali Hutti"	Ilaiyaraaja		Ilaiyaraaja	
1997	Simhada Mari	"Ninna Kannu"	Hamsalekha		K. S. Chithra	
1997	Simhada Mari	"Ushe Bandalamma"	Hamsalekha			
1997	Simhada Mari	"Kannada Nadina"	Hamsalekha			
1997	Simhada Mari	"Dekhore"	Hamsalekha			
1999	Upendra	"Masthu Masthu"	Gurukiran	Upendra		
2001	Kurigalu Saar Kurigalu	"Ayyo Hogi Saar"	Hamsalekha		Hemanth Kumar, Badri Prasad	
2001	Kurigalu Saar Kurigalu	"Nidire Baradire"	Hamsalekha			

=== Hindi discography ===
Year	Film	Song	Composer(s)	Writer(s)	Co-singer(s)	Notes
1994	Humse Hain Muqabla	"Muqabla"	A. R. Rahman	P. K. Mishra	Swarnalatha	
1995	Priyanka (Hindi Dubbed of Indira )	"Koi Yahan Bhanumati Koi Yahan Roopmati" "Barasnewali Hai Barkha"	A. R. Rahman	P. K. Mishra	Udit Narayan Swarnalatha	
1996	Aur Ek Prem Kahani	"Hona Hain Toh", "Monday To Utkar"	Ilayaraja			
1998	Satya	"Golimaar"	Vishal Bharadwaj			
2000	Josh	"Sailaro Sailare"	Anu Malik		Suresh Peters	
2019	Petta	"Mass Marudan"	Anirudh Ravichander		Anirudh	Dubbed version

=== Television serial songs ===
Year	Series	Song	Composer(s)
1996	Jenmam X	"Jenmam X"	
2001	Mandhira Vaasal	"Mandhira Vaasal"	D. Imman

== Awards ==
- 1994: Received title of Kalaimamani Award by the Government of Tamil Nadu, which is the highest state honour in the field of Arts.
- 1991: Won the Tamil Nadu State Film Award for Best Male Playback – For Various films.
- 1997: Won the Filmfare Award for Best Male Playback Singer – Telugu – "Ruku Ruku Rukmini" – Pelli
- Won the State Award of Tamil Nadu for the song "Thuliyela" from Chinna Thambi.
- 2023: Honoured with Doctrate by Richmond Gabriel University for his contribution to Music.
- 'Ghantasala Award' from Government of Andhra Pradesh
