= List of Telugu films of 1990 =

This is a list of films produced by the Telugu language film industry based in Hyderabad in the year 1990.

== List of released films ==
Title	Director	Cast	Music	Sources
20va Shatabdam	Kodi Ramakrishna	Suman, Lizzy, Suman Ranganathan	J. V. Raghavulu	
Aayudham	K. Murali Mohan Rao	Krishna, Ghattamaneni Ramesh Babu, Radha	Chakravarthy	
Adadhi	A. Mohan Gandhi	Siva Krishna, Yamuna, Sharada, Aamani	Raj Koti	
Abhisarika	Dasari Narayana Rao	Bhanumathi Ramakrishna, Ashok, Srinivas, Sarika	Krishna Teja	
Adavi Diviteelu	R. Narayana Murthy	R. Narayana Murthy, Devadas Kanakala, P. Ravishankar	Vandemataram Srinivas	
Aggiramudu		Venkatesh, Amala, Gautami, Satyanarayana Kaikala	Chakravarthy	
Agni Sakshi	M. A. Aziz	Murali Mohan, Naresh, Shobana	K. V. Mahadevan	
Agni Pravesam	Yandamuri Veerendranath	Bhargav, Ramya Krishna, Yamuna, Sudhakar	Nallori Sudhir Kumar	
Alajadi	T. Bharadwaja	Bhanuchander, Khushbu, Rahman, Naresh	Raj–Koti	
Alludugaru	K. Raghavendra Rao	Mohan Babu, Shobana, Jaggayya	K. V. Mahadevan	
Ankitham	Bandaleswara Rao	Suresh, Vijaya Rekha		
Ankusam	Kodi Ramakrishna	Rajasekhar, Jeevitha, Rami Reddy		
Anna Thammudu	Krishna	Krishna, Mahesh Babu, Gautami		
Balachandrudu	Krishna	Mahesh Babu, Kaikala Satyanarayana, R. Sarathkumar, Rami Reddy		
Bamma Maata Bangaru Baata	Rajasekhar	Rajendra Prasad, Gautami, Bhanumathi	Chandrabose	
Bobbili Raja	B. Gopal	Daggubati Venkatesh, Divya Bharti	Ilaiyaraaja	
Chaitanya	Prathap Pothan	Nagarjuna, Gautami, Girish Karnad	Ilaiyaraaja	
Chevilo Puvvu	E. V. V. Satyanarayana	Rajendra Prasad, Seetha, Brahmanandam	K. V. Mahadevan	
Chinnari Muddula Papa	Vaasi Reddy	NTR, Sobhan Babu, Kaveri		
Dagudumuthala Dampathyam	Relangi Narasimha Rao	ANR, Rajendra Prasad, Sharada		
Guru Sishyulu	Muthuraman	Rajendra Prasad, Krishnam Raju, Khushbu, Sumalatha	Ilaiyaraaja	
Idem Pellam Baboi	Ravi Teja	Rajendra Prasad, Radhika	Ilaiyaraaja	
Iddaru Iddare	A. Kodandarami Reddy	ANR, Nagarjuna, Ramya Krishna, Kota Srinivasa Rao	Raj–Koti	
Inspector Rudra	Krishna Ghattamaneni	Krishna, Yamuna	K. V. Mahadevan	
Jagadeka Veerudu Athiloka Sundari	K. Raghavendra Rao	Chiranjeevi, Sridevi, Rami Reddy	Ilaiyaraaja	
Jayammu Nischayammu Raa	Jandhyala	Rajendra Prasad		
Kadapa Redamma	Bharathwaja	Mohan Babu, Sharada		
Kartavyam	Mohan Gandhi	Vijayashanti, Vinod Kumar, Nirmalamma, Meena		
Kodama Simham	Murali Mohan Rao	Chiranjeevi, Radha, Sonam	Raj–Koti	
Kokila	Geetha Krishna	Naresh, Shobhana, Sarath Babu		Ilaiyaraaja
Kondaveeti Donga	A. Kodandarami Reddy	Chiranjeevi, Radha, Vijayashanti, Amrish Puri	Ilaiyaraaja	
Lorry Driver	B. Gopal	Balakrishna, Vijayashanti	Chakravarthy	
Magaadu	K. Madhu	Rajasekhar, Jeevitha		
Mahajananiki Maradalu Pilla	Vallabhaneni Jhanardan	Rajendra Prasad, Nirosha		
Mama Alludu	Dasari Narayana Rao	Rajendra Prasad, Vani Viswanath, Jayachitra		
Manasu Mamata	Mouli	Naresh, Sithara	M. M. Keeravani	
Master Kapuram	P. N. Ramachandra Rao	Rajendra Prasad, Gayatri		
Matti Manushulu	B. Narsing Rao	Archana		
Mrugathrushna	P. Sambasiva Rao	Revathy, Sarath Babu, P. L. Narayana		
Muddula Menalludu	Kodi Ramakrishna	Nandamuri Balakrishna, Vijayashanti		
Nari Nari Naduma Murari	A. Kodandarami Reddy	Balakrishna, Shobana, Nirosha, Sharada	K. V. Mahadevan	
Navayugam	K. Aditya	Rajendra Prasad, Meena, Vinod Kumar		
Neti Siddhartha	Kranthi Kumar	Nagarjuna, Shobana		
Police Bharya	Mohan Gandhi	Naresh, Seetha, Gollapudi Maruti Rao		
Prananiki Pranam	Chalasani Rama Rao	Nandamuri Balakrishna, Rajani		
Prema Khaidi	E. V. V. Satyanarayana	Harish, Malashri, Sharada, Brahmanandam	Rajan–Nagendra	
Prema Yuddham	S. V. Rajendra Singh Babu	Nagarjuna, Amala Akkineni		
Prema Zindabad	Jandhyala	Rajendra Prasad, Aishwarya		
Qaidi Dada	T. L. V. Prasad	Suman, Radha		
Raja Vikramarka	Ravi Raja Pinisetty	Chiranjeevi, Amala, Radhika	Raj–Koti	
Rambha Rambabu	Relangi Narasimha Rao	Rajendra Prasad, Chandra Mohan, Parijaata		
Rao Gari Intlo Rowdy	Kodi Ramakrishna	Akkineni Nageswara Rao, Vanisri, Suman, Rajani		
Sathruvu	Kodi Ramakrishna	Venkatesh, Vijayashanti, Kota Srinivasa Rao, Brahmanandam	Ilaiyaraaja	
Udhyamam	K. Ranga Rao	Bhanuchander, Yamuna		
Yamadharma Raju	Ravi Raja Pinisetty	Mohan Babu, Rambha, Sujatha	Raj–Koti	
Yauvana Poratham				
Yuvabharatham	M. S. Gopinath			

== Dubbed films ==
Title	Director	Original film		Cast	Ref.
Title	Director	Title	Language	Cast	Ref.
Lakshmi Durga	Rama Narayanan	Durgaa	Tamil	Baby Shamili, Nizhalgal Ravi, Kanaka	
Anjali	Mani Ratnam	Anjali	Tamil	Raghuvaran, Revathi, Prabhu, Tarun, Shamili	
Samrajyam	Jomon	Samrajyam	Malayalam	Mammootty, Madhu	

== Highest Grossing ==
Number	Film	Cast	Director
1.	Jagadeeka Veerudu Athiloka Sundari	Chiranjeevi, Sridevi, Amrish Puri, Tiger Prabhakar	K. Raghavendra Rao
2.	Bobbili Raja	Venkatesh Daggubati, Divya Bharati, Vanisri	B. Gopal
3.	Kondaveeti Donga	Chiranjeevi, Vijayashanti, Radha, Amrish Puri	A. Kodandarami Reddy
4.	Lorry Driver	NBK, Vijayashanti, Sarada, Mohan Raj	B. Gopal
4.	Shatruvu	Venkatesh Daggubati, Vijayashanti, Kota Srinivasa Rao	
4.	Nagastram	Krishna Ghattamaneni, Vijayashanti	Krishna Ghattamaneni
4.	Kodama Simham	Chiranjeevi, Radha, Mohan Babu	K. Murali Mohan Rao
5.	Nari Nari Naduma Murari	NBK, Sobhana, Nirosha	A. Kodandarami Reddy
5.	Alludugaru	Mohan Babu, Sobhana, Jaggayya	K. Raghavendra Rao
5.	Magaadu	Rajasekhar	K. Madhu, Jeevitha
