= Rajyalakshmi =

Indian actress

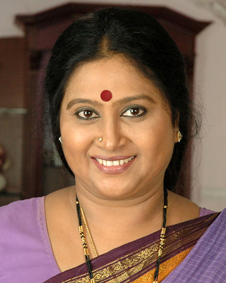
- Born: 18 December 1964
- Occupation: Film actress
- Years active: 1980–1990; 2003–present
- Spouse: K. R. Krishnan (m.1990)
- Children: 2

Rajyalakshmi Chandu, better known by her stage name Sankarabharanam Rajyalakshmi (born 18 December 1964) is an Indian actress. She was a prominent lead actress during the 1980s in Telugu, Tamil, Kannada and Malayalam films. She was well noted for her performance in the Telugu movie Sankarabharanam in which she starred as the female lead alongside Chandra Mohan at the age of fifteen. Since her success from Sankarabharanam, Rajyalakshmi has acted in all major south Indian languages. Currently she is acting in Telugu and Tamil television shows with guest appearances in movies.

== Family and personal life ==
Rajyalakshmi was born in Tenali, Andhra Pradesh. As a child she acted in small plays with her mother as part of an acting troupe where she was eventually discovered. In 1980 she was cast to play "Sarada" in Sankarabharanam to which she received critical acclaim.

She was married in the year 1990 to K. R. Krishnan and they have two children, Rohit Krishnan and Rahul Krishnan. She now resides in Chennai with her family.

== Filmography ==
Year	Film	Role	Language	Notes
1979	Koodi Baalidare Swarga Sukha		Kannada	
1980	Sankarabharanam	Sarada	Telugu	
1980	Pelli Gola	Saroja	Telugu	
1980	Rowdy Ramudu Konte Krishnudu		Telugu	
1980	Ammayi Mogudu Mamaku Yamudu		Telugu	
1980	Sujatha		Tamil	
1981	Jagamondi	Lakshmi	Telugu	
1981	Prema Natakam	Vimala	Telugu	
1981	Kodeeswaran Magal		Tamil	
1981	Ahimsa		Malayalam	
1981	Thrishna	Sreedevi	Malayalam	
1981	Muniyana Madari		Kannada	
1982	Gopala Krishnudu		Telugu	
1982	Naa Desam		Telugu	
1982	Trishulam		Telugu	
1982	Justice Chowdary	Lata	Telugu	
1982	Moondru Mugam		Tamil	
1982	Adhisayappiravigal		Tamil	
1982	Archanai Pookal		Tamil	
1982	Garuda Saukiyama		Tamil	
1982	Nalanthana		Tamil	
1982	Pooviriyum Pulari	Nandhini	Malayalam	
1982	Aakrosham	Nirmala	Malayalam	
1982	Aarambham	Rasiya	Malayalam	
1982	Sahasa Simha		Kannada	
1983	Nelavanka		Telugu	
1983	Idhi Kaadu Mugimpu	Raji	Telugu	
1983	Abhilasha		Telugu	
1983	Neti Bharatam		Telugu	
1983	Adavallu Aligithe		Telugu	
1983	Bhagavathipuram Railway Gate		Tamil	
1983	Imaigal		Tamil	
1983	Ankam	Treasa	Malayalam	
1983	Kodunkaattu	Jameela	Malayalam	
1983	Ahankaaram	Radhika	Malayalam	
1984	Rustum		Telugu	
1984	Janani Janmabhoomi		Telugu	
1984	Srimadvirat Veerabrahmendra Swami Charitra		Telugu	
1984	Rojulu Marayi		Telugu	
1984	Ee Charitra Inkennallu	Uma	Telugu	
1984	Kai Kodukkum Kai		Tamil	
1984	Naanayam Illatha Naanayam		Tamil	
1984	Sanga Natham		Tamil	
1984	Then Koodu		Tamil	
1984	Ivide Thudangunnu	Indu	Malayalam	
1984	Indina Bharatha		Kannada	
1985	Pachani Kapuram	Jyothi	Telugu	
1985	Donga		Telugu	
1985	Musugu Donga	Rajyam	Telugu	
1985	Maa Inti Mahalakshmi	Rajyam	Telugu	
1985	O Thandri Theerpu		Telugu	
1985	Aadapille Nayam		Telugu	
1985	Kadivalam		Tamil	
1985	Perumai		Tamil	
1985	Puthiya Theerpu		Tamil	
1985	Vannu Kandu Keezhadakki	Sridevi	Malayalam	
1985	Thayi Thande		Kannada	
1986	Driver Babu	Chandini	Telugu	
1986	Vikram	Seetha	Telugu	
1986	Ashtalakshmi Vaibhavamu		Telugu	
1986	Vijrumbhana	Dr. Geetha Anand	Telugu	
1986	Jayam Manade	Jyothi	Telugu	
1986	Aakrandana		Telugu	
1986	Patnam Pilla Palletoori Chinnodu		Telugu	
1986	Poojaku Panikiraani Puvvu		Telugu	
1986	Dharmapeetam Daddarillindi		Telugu	
1986	Chanakya Shapatham	Savithri	Telugu	
1986	Kashmora	Poornima	Telugu	
1986	Meendum Pallavi		Tamil	
1986	Manithanin Marupakkam		Tamil	
1986	Anandha Kanneer		Tamil	
1986	Thaaiku Oru Thaalaattu		Tamil	
1986	Aayiram Kannukal	Suzy	Malayalam	
1986	Ilanjippookkal		Malayalam	
1986	Usha		Kannada	
1987	Pasivadi Pranam		Telugu	
1987	Rotation Chakravarthy		Telugu	
1987	Chinnari Devatha		Telugu	
1987	Jaganmatha		Telugu	
1987	Madana Gopaludu		Telugu	
1987	Dharmapatni		Telugu	
1987	President Gari Abbai	Satyavathi	Telugu	
1987	Pookkal Vidum Thudhu		Tamil	
1987	Poovizhi Vasalile		Tamil	
1987	Shankar Guru		Tamil	
1987	Ithente Neethi		Malayalam	
1987	Amrutham Gamaya	Sarada	Malayalam	
1987	Manavararu		Kannada	
1988	Jhansi Rani		Telugu	
1988	Bharya Bharthalu		Telugu	
1988	Vivaha Bhojanambu		Telugu	
1988	Chinababu		Telugu	
1988	Nyayaniki Siksha		Telugu	
1988	Aadadhe Aadharam		Telugu	
1988	Abhinandana		Telugu	
1988	Thodallullu		Telugu	
1988	Neerajanam		Telugu	
1988	August 15 Raatri		Telugu	
1988	Samsaram		Telugu	
1988	Agni Keratalu	Kavitha	Telugu	
1988	Kaliyuga Karnudu	Seetha	Telugu	
1988	Soora Samhaaram		Tamil	
1988	Kaadhal Geetham		Tamil	
1989	Sahasame Naa Oopiri		Telugu	
1989	Paila Pacheesu		Telugu	
1989	Aakhari Kshanam		Telugu	
1989	Yamapasam		Telugu	
1989	Police Report		Telugu	
1989	Kai Veesamma Kai Veesu		Tamil	
1989	Dravidan		Tamil	
1989	En Arumai Manaivi		Tamil	
1989	Oru Vadakkan Veeragatha	Kuttimani	Malayalam	
1989	Kaalalppada	Mercy Raveendranath	Malayalam	
1990	Idem Pellam Baboi		Telugu	
1990	Inspector Rudra		Telugu	
1990	Chevilo Puvvu		Telugu	
1990	Police Bharya		Telugu	
1990	Raktha Jwala		Telugu	
1990	Bhargav		Telugu	
1990	Nyayangal Jeyikkattum		Tamil	
1990	Pudhu Padagan		Tamil	
1990	Thalattu Padava		Tamil	
1990	Superstar	Kanchana	Malayalam	
1992	Police Diary		Malayalam	
1993	Kalachakram		Telugu	
1994	Palletoori Mogudu		Telugu	
2003	Parasuram		Tamil	
2004	Anji		Telugu	
2004	Swarabhishekam		Telugu	
2004	Malliswari		Telugu	
2004	Dreams		Tamil	
2005	Dhairyam		Telugu	
2005	Athanokkade		Telugu	
2005	Mr. Errababu		Telugu	
2005	Premikulu		Telugu	
2005	Good Boy		Telugu	
2005	Thirupaachi		Tamil	
2005	Priyasakhi		Tamil	
2005	Chess	Vijayakrishnan's mother	Malayalam	
2006	Evandoi Srivaru		Telugu	
2006	Maa Iddari Madhya		Telugu	
2006	Thirupathi		Tamil	
2006	Em Magan		Tamil	
2006	Varalaru		Tamil	
2007	Chandrahas		Telugu	
2007	Aadavari Matalaku Arthale Verule		Telugu	
2007	Mudhal Kanave		Tamil	
2008	Sadhu Miranda		Tamil	
2008	Dhanam		Tamil	
2008	Yaaradi Nee Mohini		Tamil	
2008	Pirivom Santhippom		Tamil	
2009	Oru Kadhalan Oru Kadhali		Tamil	
2010	Adhurs		Telugu	
2010	Kutty		Tamil	
2010	Vaada		Tamil	
2010	Uthamaputhiran		Tamil	
2010	Puthumukhangal	Subhadra	Malayalam	
2011	Parama Veera Chakra		Telugu	
2012	Nuvvekkadunte Nenakkadunta		Telugu	
2012	Medhai		Tamil	
2012	Aathi Narayana		Tamil	
2012	Ariyaan		Tamil	
2013	Proprietors: Kammath & Kammath	Kammath's mother	Malayalam	
2014	Saivam		Tamil	
2016	Naruda Donoruda		Telugu	
2018	Kaala Koothu		Tamil	
2020	Prati Roju Pandage		Telugu	
2020	Shylock	Chinnamma	Malayalam	
2021	Naandhi		Telugu	
2021	Iruvar Ullam		Tamil	
2024	Swag		Telugu	

== Television series ==
Year	Title	Role	Channel	Language
1991	Penn	Sujatha	Doodarshan	Tamil
2007–2010	Megala	Thilaga	Sun TV	Tamil
2009	Kanmaneeya	Amutha / Rajalakshmi	Sun TV	Tamil
2010–2012	No.23 Mahalakshmi Nivasam		Gemini TV	Telugu
2010–2011	Kasthuri	Bhagyam	Sun TV	Tamil
2011–2012	Pirivom Santhippom 1	Dhanam	Vijay TV	Tamil
2012	Chellamay	Parvathi	Sun TV	Tamil
2012–2014	Pilai Nila	Neelaveni	Sun TV	Tamil
2012–2014	Paartha Gnabagam Illayo	Kalavathi	Kalaignar TV	Tamil
2013	Pirivom Santhippom 2	Dhanam	Vijay TV	Tamil
2013–2015	Deivamagal	Sampoornam	Sun TV	Tamil
2014	Amma		Gemini TV	Telugu
2017–2019	Raja Rani	Lakshmi Rajasekhar	Star Vijay	Tamil
2017–2019	Azhagu	Devi Manimaran	Sun TV	Tamil
2019	Kanulu Moosina Neevayee	Jagadamba	Star Maa	Telugu
2020	Vadinamma	Parvathy	Star Maa	Telugu
2020–2025	Baakiyalakshmi	Eshwari	Star Vijay	Tamil
2021–2022	Anbe Vaa	Saraswati	Sun TV	Tamil
2021–2022	Pandian Stores	Eshwari	Star Vijay	Tamil
2024–present	Annam	Shenbagavalli	Sun TV	Tamil
2026	Kadhal Kadhal Kadhal	Grandma	Star Vijay	Tamil
