= Pellaniki Premalekha Priyuraliki Subhalekha =

- Title card
- Directed by: Relangi Narasimha Rao
- Written by: Kaasi Viswanath (dialogues)
- Screenplay by: Relangi Narasimha Rao
- Story by: Relangi Narasimha Rao; Kaasi Viswanath
- Produced by: Vadde Naveen
- Starring: Rajendra Prasad; Sruthi; Nandini
- Cinematography: Sarath
- Edited by: G. G. Krishna Rao
- Music by: J. V. Raghavulu
- Production company: Sri Nalini Cine Creations
- Release date: 9 June 1992
- Running time: 139 mins
- Country: India
- Language: Telugu

Pellaniki Premalekha Priyuraliki Subhalekha (transl. Love letter to wife, Wedding card to lover) is a 1992 Telugu-language comedy film directed by Relangi Narasimha Rao and produced by Vadde Naveen. It stars Rajendra Prasad, Sruthi, and Nandini in lead roles, with music composed by J. V. Raghavulu.

== Cast ==
- Rajendra Prasad as Raja
- Sruthi as Keerthi
- Nandini as Swathi
- Brahmanandam as Lakshman Rao
- Babu Mohan as Dusyanthudu
- Gundu Hanumantha Rao as Sannassi
- Kaasi Viswanath as Inspector
- Krishna Chaitanya as Khan Saab
- Srilakshmi as Lakshman Rao's wife
- Pakhija as Dusyanthudu's wife
- Chandrika as Dusyanthudu's wife

== Music ==
Pellaniki Premalekha Priyuraliki Subhalekha

Film score by J. V. Raghavulu
- Released: 1992
- Genre: Soundtrack
- Length: 26:45
- Label: Surya Audio
- Producer: J. V. Raghavulu

J. V. Raghavulu chronology
Edurinti Mogudu Pakkinti Pellam (1991)	Pellaniki Premalekha Priyuraliki Subhalekha (1992)	Bramhachari Mogudu (1994)

Music was composed by J. V. Raghavulu. Audio soundtrack was released on Surya Audio.

No.	Title	Lyrics	Singer(s)	Length
1.	"Pakkesi Unchuko"	Sahithi	S. P. Balasubrahmanyam, Chitra	4:04
2.	"Bath Roomlo"	Veturi	S. P. Balasubrahmanyam, Chitra	3:59
3.	"One Two Three"	Veturi	S. P. Balasubrahmanyam, Chitra	4:49
4.	"Alli Billi"	Sahithi	S. P. Balasubrahmanyam, Chitra	3:44
5.	"Kattu Kunna Vaade"	Veturi	Chitra, S. P. Sailaja	5:18
6.	"Kannugotti Ra"	Sahithi	Mano, S. P. Sailaja, Ramani	4:51
Total length:				26:45
