= Madana Gopaludu =

- Theatrical release poster
- Directed by: P. S. Krishna Mohan Reddy
- Written by: Madhu (dialogues)
- Screenplay by: P. S. Krishna Mohan Reddy
- Story by: Thotakura Aasalatha
- Produced by: V. Ramakrishna; P. Surendra Nath Reddy
- Starring: Rajendra Prasad; Ramya Krishna
- Cinematography: Divakar
- Edited by: K. Ram Gopal Reddy
- Music by: Sivaji Raja
- Production company: Sri Sailaja Combines
- Release date: 16 September 1987
- Running time: 137 mins
- Country: India
- Language: Telugu

Madana Gopaludu is a 1987 Telugu-language drama film, produced by V. Ramakrishna and P. Surendra Nath Reddy under the Sri Sailaja Combines banner and directed by P. S. Krishna Mohan Reddy. It stars Rajendra Prasad, Ramya Krishna and music composed by Sivaji Raja.

== Cast ==
- Rajendra Prasad as Gopalam
- Ramya Krishna as Gowri
- Gollapudi Maruthi Rao as Ranga Chary
- J. V. Somayajulu as Rama Chary
- Suthi Veerabhadra Rao as Manmadha & Ramba (dual role)
- Narayana Rao as Dasu
- Balaji as Syedulu
- Pucha Poornanandam as Bhushaiah
- Rajyalakshmi as Poornima
- Radha Kumari as Ranga Chary's wife
- Mamatha as Subba Lakshmi
- Dubbing Janaki as Seeta

== Soundtrack ==
Madana Gopaludu

Film score by Sivaji Raja
- Released: 1987
- Genre: Soundtrack
- Length: 21:07
- Label: AVM Audio
- Producer: Sivaji Raja

Music composed by Sivaji Raja. Lyrics were written by Acharya Aatreya. The music was released on AVM Audio Company.

S. No.	Song title	Singers	length
1	"Madana Gopaludu"	S. P. Balasubrahmanyam	4:12
2	"Kondavagai Kodenagai"	S. P. Balasubrahmanyam, S. Janaki	4:01
3	"Pramadala Aasala"	Vani Jayaram, S.P. Sailaja	4:27
4	"Vannava Chindi"	Madhavpeddi Ramesh, Chitra	3:52
5	"Brathakadam Neekentha"	P. Susheela	4:35
