= Gundamma Gari Krishnulu =

- Title card
- Directed by: Relangi Narasimha Rao
- Written by: Satyanand(dialogues)
- Screenplay by: Relangi Narasimha Rao
- Story by: Bhamidapaati Radhakrishna Murthy
- Produced by: Midde Rama Rao
- Starring: Rajendra Prasad; Rajani
- Cinematography: B. Koteswara Rao
- Edited by: D. Venkataratnam
- Music by: Chakravarthy
- Production company: Sri Rajalakshmi Art Pictures
- Release date: 6 August 1987
- Running time: 120 min
- Country: India
- Language: Telugu

Gundamma Gari Krishnulu (transl. Gundamma's Krishnas) is a 1987 Telugu-language comedy film, produced by Midde Rama Rao under the Sri Rajalakshmi Art Pictures banner and directed by Relangi Narasimha Rao. It stars Rajendra Prasad, Subhalekha Sudhakar, Rajani, Poornima, and Nirmalamma. The music composed by Chakravarthy. The film was recorded as a hit at the box office.

== Cast ==
- Rajendra Prasad as Pedda Gopala Krishna
- Rajani as Saroja
- Subhalekha Sudhakar as Chinna Gopala Krishna
- Poornima as Lakshmi
- Suthi Veerabhadra Rao as Gangadharam
- Suthi Velu as Seetapati
- Kota Srinivasa Rao as Gun Papa Rao
- Benerjee as Mohan
- KK Sarma as Marriage Broker Panthulu
- Bhemiswara Rao as Lakshmi's father
- Chidatala Appa Rao as Rikshawala
- Dham
- Sri Lakshmi as Gangadharam's second wife
- Radha Kumari as Parvathi
- Dubbing Janaki as Janaki
- Nirmalamma as Gundamma

== Soundtrack ==
Gundamma Gari Krishnulu

Film score by K. Chakravarthy
- Released: 1987
- Genre: Soundtrack
- Length: 16:17
- Label: LEO Audio
- Producer: K. Chakravarthy

Music composed by K. Chakravarthy was released on LEO Audio Company. Lyrics were written by Veturi and Sirivennela Seetharama Sastry.

Track list
No.	Title	Lyrics	Singer(s)	Length
1.	"Thom Tharikita Tharikita"	Veturi	Mano, P. Susheela	3:37
2.	"How Are You Miss Give Me A Kiss"	Veturi	Mano, P. Susheela	4:03
3.	"Hey Krishna Mukunda"	Veturi	Mano, P. Susheela	4:41
4.	"Poddu Manaku Vaddu"	Sirivennela Seetharama Sastry	Mano, P. Susheela	3:56
Total length:				16:17

== Other ==
- VCDs and DVDs on - SHALIMAR Video Company, Hyderabad
