= Samsaram (1988 film) =

- Theatrical release poster
- Directed by: Relangi Narasimha Rao
- Written by: Satyanand (dialogues)
- Screenplay by: Relangi Narasimha Rao
- Story by: Balachandra Menon
- Based on: Oru Painkilikatha (1984)
- Produced by: Sakhamuuri Ramachandra Rao
- Starring: Sobhan Babu; Jaya Prada; Sharada; Rajendra Prasad; Rajani
- Cinematography: Sarath
- Edited by: D. Venkataratnam
- Music by: Raj–Koti
- Production company: SR Films
- Release date: 1 January 1988
- Running time: 143 mins
- Country: India
- Language: Telugu

Samsaram (transl. Family) is a 1988 Telugu-language drama film, produced by Sakhamuuri Ramachandra Rao under the SR Films banner and directed by Relangi Narasimha Rao. It stars Sobhan Babu, Jaya Prada, Sharada, Rajendra Prasad, Rajani and music composed by Raj–Koti. The film is a remake of the Malayalam film Oru Painkilikatha (1984) which was earlier remade in Tamil as Thaaiku Oru Thaalaattu (1986). The film was recorded as a Super Hit at the box office.

== Plot ==
The film begins with a martinet, Raja Shekaram, a tycoon who lives delightfully with his wife Lakshmi and three children. However, his elder Hari & daughter Radha follow in his footsteps. He excludes the second, Ravi, who works as a laborer in his factory and blisses life. Ravi loves an orphan, Gowri. With the aid of their intimate insider, Gopalam, Ravi copes by setting her as a servant. Meanwhile, Raja Shekaram couples Radha with a well-educated Kumar. Then, he discerns Ravi's love affair and expels him when Ravi quits and espouses Gowri. Soon after, for his selfhood, the vicious union leader Seshagiri / Seshu raises issues in the factory and drags Ravi, creating a feud between father & son. The Govt. appoints a special labor officer, Padmavathi, to resolve the conflict when Raja Shekaram is startled as she is his first love. Now, he divulges the past to Lakshmi. Indeed, the two were turtle doves in their student years, but destiny stipulated that he splice Lakshmi for his sibling. Forthwith, Lakshmi acquits Padmavathi, which concerns herself with a wrong choice for her husband and leaves the breath. Here, Raja Shekaram is left alone, and Padmavathi also heads out. So, he shifts to his elder but backs as Hari is bustling. Till then, Kumar occupies his house and deserts him. At last, Ravi stands up for his father's honor when Raja Shekaram comprehends his virtue. Finally, the movie ends happily with Raja Shekaram spending the rest of his life with Ravi & Gowri.

== Cast ==
- Sobhan Babu as Raja Sekharam
- Jaya Prada as Padmavathi
- Sharada as Lakshmi
- Rajendra Prasad as Ravi Babu
- Rajani as Gowri
- Gollapudi Maruthi Rao as Gopalam
- Sudhakar as Kumar
- Prasad Babu as Seshagiri / Seshu
- Hari Prasad as Hari Babu
- Sakshi Ranga Rao as Manager Dharma Rao
- Rajyalakshmi as Lalitha
- Varalakshmi as Radha
- Baby Raasi as Raja Shekaram's granddaughter

== Soundtrack ==
Samsaram

Film score by Raj–Koti
- Released: 1988
- Genre: Soundtrack
- Length: 24:07
- Label: LEO Audio
- Producer: Raj–Koti

Raj–Koti chronology
Pape Maa Pranam (1987)	Samsaram (1988)	Thodallullu (1988)

Music composed by Raj–Koti. Music released on LEO Audio Company.

S. No.	Song title	Lyrics	Singers	length
1	"Kommalo Koiyila"	Veturi	S. P. Balasubrahmanyam, P. Susheela	4:56
2	"Neevallu Vyaaram"	Veturi	S. P. Balasubrahmanyam, Chitra	4:45
3	"Ralugayi Rambha Lati"	Jonnavithhula Ramalingeswara Rao	S. P. Balasubrahmanyam, Chitra	4:29
4	"O Thappa Thagina"	Veturi	S. P. Balasubrahmanyam, SP Sailaja, G. Anand	5:04
5	"Evaramma Neeku"	Acharya Aatreya	S. P. Balasubrahmanyam	4:53

== Other ==
- VCDs & DVDs on - HYDERABAD Video Company, Hyderabad
