= Dabbevariki Chedu =

- VCD cover
- Directed by: Relangi Narasimha Rao
- Written by: Diwakar Babu (dialogues)
- Screenplay by: Relangi Narasimha Rao
- Story by: Malladi Venkata Krishna Murthy
- Produced by: S. Io; Ramalingaraju
- Starring: Rajendra Prasad; Chandra Mohan; Sarath Babu; Seetha
- Cinematography: B. Koteswara Rao
- Edited by: D. Raja Gopal
- Music by: Vasu Rao
- Production company: Tarakanama Movies
- Release date: 1 January 1987
- Running time: 138 minutes
- Country: India
- Language: Telugu

Dabbevariki Chedu (transl. Money is Bitter to Whom?) is a 1987 Telugu-language comedy film, produced by S. Ramalingaraju under the Tarakanama Movies banner and directed by Relangi Narasimha Rao. It stars Rajendra Prasad, Chandra Mohan, Sarath Babu, Seetha and music composed by Saluri Vasu Rao. It was released on 1 January 1987. The film is the debut of actress Seetha in the Telugu film industry.

== Cast ==
- Rajendra Prasad as Vidyasagar
- Chandra Mohan as Lakshmikanth
- Seetha as Mamatha
- Sarath Babu as Govardhanam
- Dasari Narayana Rao as himself (Guest)
- Suthi Veerabhadra Rao as Viswanatham
- Suthi Velu as Various Names
- Nutan Prasad as Lawyer Dharmalingam
- Prabhakar Reddy as Justice Paramahamsa
- Raavi Kondala Rao as Govardhanam's Manager
- Potti Prasad as Lawyer Nookaraju
- Eeswar Rao as Manohar
- Mukku Raju as Beggar
- Krishna Chaitanya as Bus Conductor
- Gadiraju Subba Raju as Client
- Sulakshana as Swarna
- Deepa as Jayasila
- Manochitra as Devi
- Padmanabham as Bank Manager
- Dubbing Janaki as Dharmalingam's wife
- Kalpana Rai as Vidyaratnam

== Crew ==
- Art: Somanath, Bhaskara Rao
- Choreography: Anthony, Raju, Nambiraju
- Lyrics: Acharya Aatreya, C. Narayana Reddy, Kosaraju, Sirivennela Seetharama Sastry
- Playback: S. P. Balasubrahmanyam, V. Ramakrishna, Madhavapeddi Ramesh, P. Susheela, Vani Jayaram, S. P. Sailaja
- Story: Malladi Venkata Krishna Murthy
- Dialogues: Diwakar Babu
- Music: Saluri Vasu Rao
- Editing: D. Rajagopal
- Cinematography: B. Koteswara Rao
- Publicity Designer: Lanka Bhaskar
- Producer: S. Ramalinga Raju
- Screenplay- Director: Relangi Narasimha Rao
- Banner: Tharakanama Movies

== Soundtrack ==
Dabbevariki Chedu

Film score by Saluri Vasu Rao
- Released: 1987
- Genre: Soundtrack
- Length: 21:27
- Label: Lahari Music
- Producer: Saluri Vasu Rao

Music composed by Saluri Vasu Rao was released through Lahari Music. Lyrics were written by Acharya Aatreya, C. Narayana Reddy, Kosaraju and Sirivennela Seetharama Sastry.

Track list
No.	Title	Lyrics	Singer(s)	Length
1.	"Dabbevariki Chedu"	Acharya Aatreya	S. P. Balasubrahmanyam	4:26
2.	"Panchadaara Chilakaa"	Sirivennela Seetharama Sastry	S. P. Balasubrahmanyam, P. Susheela	5:03
3.	"Nuvvunte Vihaaram"	C. Narayana Reddy	Vani Jayaram	3:47
4.	"Ettuku Pai Ettu"	Acharya Aatreya	S. P. Balasubrahmanyam, P. Susheela, S. P. Sailaja, Madhavapeddi Ramesh	4:11
5.	"Thagunaa"	Kosaraju	S. P. Balasubrahmanyam, V. Ramakrishna	4:00
Total length:				21:27

== Others ==
- VCDs and DVDs on - Santosh Video Company, Hyderabad
