= Pondatti Sonna Kettukanum =

- Poster
- Directed by: V. Sekhar
- Written by: V. Sekhar
- Produced by: K. Parthiban; Vetriyur K. Sethu; A. Rajendran
- Starring: Chandrasekhar; Bhanupriya
- Cinematography: G. Rajendran
- Edited by: A. P. Manivannan
- Music by: Chandrabose
- Production company: Jayalakshmi Art Creations
- Release date: 28 November 1991
- Country: India
- Language: Tamil

Pondatti Sonna Kettukanum (transl. Obey your wife) is a 1991 Indian Tamil-language comedy drama film written and directed by V. Sekhar. The film was produced by K. Parthiban, Vetriyur K. Sethu and A. Rajendran under Jayalakshmi Art Creations. The film stars Bhanupriya and Chandrasekhar, with Goundamani, Senthil, Charle and Chinni Jayanth portraying supporting roles.

The cinematography and editing was handled by G. Rajendran and A. P. Manivannan. The soundtrack was composed by Chandrabose. The film was released on 28 November 1991.

== Plot ==
The film revolves around how women are treated in a male chauvinist family setting. The father-in-law Dharmalingam (Goundamani) and mother-in-law (Manorama) look down upon their 3 daughters-in-law Thangam, Indira and Girija.

Things get worse when Dharmalingam and his youngest son torture their mute daughter-in-law on coming to know that her father died leaving behind a huge debt and even try to kill her and her baby.

Taking things into their hands, the 3 daughters-in-law decide to reform their husbands and ultimately their father-in-law and mother-in-law culminating into a comical ending.

== Cast ==
- Bhanupriya as Indira
- Chandrasekhar as Indira's husband / Dharamalingam's 2nd son
- Goundamani as Dharmalingam
- Senthil as Villager
- Kumarimuthu as Villager
- Manorama as Dharmalingam's wife
- Charle Dharamalingam's 1st son
- Chinni Jayanth as Dharamalingam's 3rd son
- Vetri Vigneshwar as Dharmalingam 4th son
- Kovai Sarala as Thangam, Dharamalingam's 1st daughter-in-law
- Devishree as Girija, Dharamalingam's 3rd daughter-in-law
- Meera as Meenakshi, Dharamalingam's 4th daughter-in-law
- Thideer Kannaiah as police constable
- MLA Thangaraj as police officer

== Production ==
The film was based on events that happened in Sekhar's next door neighbour's life.

== Soundtrack ==
Soundtrack was composed by Chandrabose and lyrics were written by Vaali and Muthulingam.

- Pondatti Sonna – Mano, Chithra, Deepan Chakravarthy, Lalitha Sagari
- Chinna Chinna Varigal – S. P. Balasubramaniam
- Jolluthan Jolluthan – S. P. Balasubramaniam, Chithra
- Vanthale therku – P. Susheela, S. Janaki, Vani Jayaram,
- Naanthaan Di – S. P. Shailaja
- Ponne poovamma– P. Susheela

== Reception ==
C. R. K. of Kalki gave a mixed review for the film citing that film which promised to revolve around a revolutionary woman but breaks anticipation around it and the film wanders around aimlessly. He also noted that Bhanupriya and Chandrasekhar were wasted but appreciated Goundamani's performance. The film ran for over 100 days in theatres, and Manorama won the Cinema Express Award for Best Comedy Actress.

== Remakes ==
Year	Title	Language
1992	Pellam Chepithe Vinali	Telugu
1993	Hendthi Helidare Kelabeku	Kannada
1997	Kottappurathe Koottukudumbam	Malayalam
