= Thodallullu =

- Theatrical release poster
- Directed by: Relangi Narasimha Rao
- Written by: Kaasi Viswanath (dialogues)
- Screenplay by: Relangi Narasimha Rao
- Story by: Relangi Narasimha Rao; Kaasi Viswanath
- Produced by: G. V. G. Raju
- Starring: Rajendra Prasad; Chandra Mohan; Gautami
- Cinematography: B. Koteswara Rao
- Edited by: D. Rajagopal
- Music by: Raj–Koti
- Production company: Vijaya Lakshmi Movies
- Release date: 15 July 1988
- Running time: 136 mins
- Country: India
- Language: Telugu

Thodallullu (transl. Co-Brothers) is a 1988 Telugu-language comedy film, produced by G.V.G. Raju under the Vijaya Lakshmi Movies banner and directed by Relangi Narasimha Rao. It stars Rajendra Prasad, Chandra Mohan, Gautami and music composed by Raj–Koti.

== Cast ==
- Rajendra Prasad as Bhaskar
- Gautami as Aruna
- Chandra Mohan as Mohan
- Satyanarayana as Narasimham
- Subhalekha Sudhakar as LIC Agent Sudhakar
- Suthi Velu as Dharma Rao
- Vinod as Ramesh
- Vijaya Rangaraju as Mangal Singh
- Haranath as Manager
- Bhimeswara Rao as Venkatraju
- K. K. Sarma as Marriage Broker
- Gadiraju Subba Rao as House Owner
- Srilakshmi as Lakshmi
- Rajyalakshmi as Uma
- P. R. Varalakshmi as Varalakshmi
- Kuyili in item number
- Rajitha as Rani
- Nirmalamma as Papayamma

== Soundtrack ==
Thodallullu

Film score by Raj–Koti
- Released: 1988
- Genre: Soundtrack
- Length: 20:38
- Label: LEO Audio
- Producer: Raj–Koti

Raj–Koti chronology
Samsaram (1988)	Thodallullu (1988)	Jeevana Jyothi (1988)

Music composed by Raj–Koti. Music released on LEO Audio Company.

S. No.	Song title	Lyrics	Singers	length
1	"Ammalara Kalyanam"	Jonnavithhula	S. P. Balasubrahmanyam, Madhavpeddi Ramesh	4:13
2	"A Aa E Ee"	C. Narayana Reddy	S. P. Balasubrahmanyam, S. Janaki	4:15
3	"Jadalo Chamthidanda"	C. Narayana Reddy	S. P. Balasubrahmanyam, S. Janaki	3:52
4	"Hey Gundu"	C. Narayana Reddy	S. P. Balasubrahmanyam, S. Janaki	4:23
5	"Chaligavundi Raraa"	C. Narayana Reddy	S. P. Balasubrahmanyam, Ramana, S. Janaki	3:55
