= Parugo Parugu =

- Title card
- Directed by: Relangi Narasimha Rao
- Screenplay by: Relangi Narasimha Rao
- Based on: Parugo Parugu by Malik
- Produced by: Sudhakar
- Dialogues by: Y. Kasi Viswanath
- Starring: Rajendra Prasad; Sruthi
- Cinematography: Sarath
- Edited by: Ravindra Babu
- Music by: Raj–Koti
- Production company: Satyadev Movie Makers
- Release date: 13 October 1994
- Running time: 131 minutes
- Country: India
- Language: Telugu

Parugo Parugu is a 1994 Indian Telugu-language comedy film directed by Relangi Narasimha Rao and produced by comedian Sudhakar. The film stars Rajendra Prasad and Sruthi in lead roles, with music composed by Raj–Koti. Based on Malik's novel of the same name, the film was a failure at the box office.

== Plot ==
Rambabu is an inept photographer who runs a photo studio with his assistant, Kittigadu. Their poor-quality photos often lead to confrontations with dissatisfied customers. Rambabu's life takes a turn when he meets Saroja, a woman he helps in a dispute, and the two fall in love. Under Saroja's guidance, Rambabu improves his photography skills and becomes a perfectionist.

Meanwhile, Ranganatha Rao, a powerful racketeer, is warned by his wife, Neelima, about potential police action if he does not cease his illegal activities. By chance, Neelima befriends Saroja, who advises her to visit Rambabu to learn about an automatic camera. During the visit, Neelima faints, and a photograph captures Rambabu holding her. At the same time, Ranganatha Rao continues to benefit from the ideas of his associate, Jackal, whom he treats with disdain. Seeking revenge, Jackal secretly photographs Ranganatha Rao’s henchmen, Veeru and Jaggu, murdering Neelima on his orders.

As Rambabu prepares for an all-India photography competition, he discovers Neelima's corpse while developing photos. He reports the incident to the police, but the inept Inspector Appalakonda mistakenly arrests Rambabu. With Saroja's help, Rambabu proves his innocence, and they uncover Neelima's body. Determined to expose the killer, Rambabu inadvertently implicates himself when a random photo from the crime scene surfaces. Fearing arrest, he flees with Kittigadu and deduces Ranganatha Rao's involvement in the murder.

In a series of comedic events, Rambabu and Kittigadu chase Ranganatha Rao and his associates. They encounter Jackal, who attempts to blackmail Ranganatha Rao with photographic evidence of Neelima's murder. However, Veeru and Jaggu kill Jackal, who swallows the negative of the incriminating photo before dying. The negative becomes crucial evidence to prove Rambabu's innocence, leading to a chaotic pursuit of Jackal's body to retrieve it.

The climax unfolds in a theatre where a spoof of the Mahabharata is being performed. Rambabu, Ranganatha Rao, and Inspector Appalakonda converge in a comedic confrontation. Ultimately, Rambabu retrieves the negative from Jackal's stomach, proving his innocence and exposing Ranganatha Rao's crimes. The film concludes on a happy note with Rambabu and Saroja's marriage.

== Cast ==
- Rajendra Prasad as Rambabu / Angala (in disguise)
- Sruthi as Saroja
- Brahmanandam as Simha Swapnam
- Sudhakar as Special appearance
- Gollapudi Maruti Rao as Saroja's father
- Allu Ramalingaiah as Parandhamayya
- Padmanadham as Kirana store owner
- Giri Babu as Veeru
- Chalapathi Rao as Ranganatha Rao
- Mallikarjuna Rao as S. I. Appalakonda
- Dharmavarapu Subramanyam as Jackal
- Pradeep Shakthi as Jaggu
- Chinna as Constable
- Gundu Hanumantha Rao as Koyadora
- Ananth as Kittigadu / Pingala (in disguise)
- Visweswara Rao as Nakkaraju
- Kaasi Viswanath as Hotel Manager
- Krishna Chaitanya as Hotel Server
- Kallu Chidambaram
- Disco Shanthi as Veeramma
- Hema as Hema
- Dubbing Janaki as Rambabu's mother
- Deepika as Neelima

== Music ==
Music was composed by Raj–Koti with lyrics written by Jonnavithhula.

No.	Title	Singer(s)	Length
1.	"Mounamela"	S. P. Balasubrahmanyam, Chitra	4:37
2.	"Bugga Bugga"	Malgudi Subha	3:52
3.	"Kidaninchi Paiki"	Mano, S. P. Sailaja	4:00
4.	"Ajantha Guhalo"	S. P. Balasubrahmanyam, Chitra	3:57
5.	"Howare"	S. P. Balasubrahmanyam, Chitra	3:25
Total length:			19:41
