= Hendthi Helidare Kelabeku =

- Directed by: Relangi Narasimha Rao
- Written by: Chi. Udayashankar (dialogues)
- Screenplay by: Relangi Narasimha Rao
- Story by: V. Sekhar
- Based on: Pondatti Sonna Kettukanum (Tamil)(1992)
- Produced by: Murali Mohan; Vijayalakshmi; Padmajavani
- Starring: Malashri; Harish Kumar; Dwarakish
- Cinematography: K. Hari
- Edited by: Narasaiah
- Music by: Chakravarthy
- Production company: Jayabheri Art Productions
- Release date: 1993
- Running time: 149 minutes
- Country: India
- Language: Kannada

Hendthi Helidare Kelabeku (transl. Obey your wife) is a 1993 Indian Kannada-language comedy drama film, directed by Relangi Narasimha Rao and is a remake of the Tamil film Pondatti Sonna Kettukanum. The film stars Malashri and Harish Kumar, with Dwarakish, Umashree, Balaraj, and Srikanth in key supporting roles.

The film's music was composed by Chakravarthy and the audio was launched on the Lahari Music banner.

== Cast ==
- Malashri as Mala
- Harish Kumar as Subbu aka Subramanya, Mala's Husband, Eeshwaryya's youngest son
- Dwarakish as Eeshwarayya, Mala's father-in-law
- Umashree as Eeshwaryya's wife
- Balaraj as Eeshwaryya's Second Son, Prema's Husband
- Ramesh Bhat as Eeshwaryya's Eldest Son, Sarala's Husband
- Srinath as Mala's Father
- Sathyabhama as Ganga Bai
- Srikanth as Mohan, Eeshwaryya's third son, Vani's Husband
- Kovai Sarala as Sarala, Eeshwaryya's Eldest daughter-in-law
- G. R. Bheema Rao
- Kunigal Nagabhushan

== Soundtrack ==
The music of the film was composed by Chakravarthy and the lyrics were written by Chi. Udaya Shankar.

Track listing
No.	Title	Lyrics	Singer(s)	Length
1.	"Teenage Banthu"	Chi. Udaya Shankar	S. P. Balasubrahmanyam, Swarnalatha
2.	"Ganda Helidare"	Chi. Udaya Shankar	S. P. Balasubrahmanyam
3.	"Baare Bangaara"	Chi. Udaya Shankar	Manjula Gururaj, Swarnalatha
4.	"Malashri Malashri"	Chi. Udaya Shankar	S. P. Balasubrahmanyam, Swarnalatha
5.	"Hendathi Helidare"	Chi. Udaya Shankar	Manjula Gururaj, Swarnalatha
