= Manushulatho Jagratha =

- Movie Poster
- Directed by: Govinda Varaha
- Written by: Govinda Varaha
- Produced by: B. Chiranjeevulu Naidu
- Starring: Rajendra Prasad; Naresh; Akshay Tej; Soniya Biriji
- Cinematography: Anand Dola; Satish Mutyala
- Edited by: Vinay Rai
- Music by: Pranav
- Production company: Vasundhara Academy
- Release date: 21 December 2013
- Running time: 136 mins
- Country: India
- Language: Telugu

Manushulatho Jagratha (transl. Be-careful with Humans) is a 2013 Telugu-language fantasy film, produced by B. Chiranjeevulu Naidu on Vasundhara Academy banner and directed by Govinda Varaha. Starring Rajendra Prasad, Naresh, Akshay Tej, Soniya Biriji and music composed by Pranav.

== Cast ==
- Rajendra Prasad as Yama
- Naresh as Brahma
- Akshay Tej as Ramaraju
- Soniya Biriji as Neetu
- M. S. Narayana as Solmen Raju
- A.V.S as T. V. Channel Owner
- Posani Krishna Murali
- Pruthvi Raj as Inspector
- Krishna Bhagawan as Chitragupta
- Poornima as Doctor
- Kadamdari Kiran as Naakudu Baba
- Gundu Sudarshan
- Gautham Raju as Doctor
- Ambati Srinivas as Nataraju
- Suman Setty as Kamaraju
- Sarika Ramachandra Rao
- Junior Relangi

== Soundtrack ==
Manushulatho Jagratha

Film score by Pranav
- Released: 2013
- Genre: Soundtrack
- Length: 19:39
- Label: Aditya Music
- Producer: Pranav

Music composed by Pranav. Music released by ADITYA Music Company.

No.	Title	Lyrics	Singer(s)	Length
1.	"O Devuda Chusavuga"	Balaji	Deepu	3:34
2.	"Emunnade Ninnu Chudadaniki"	Balaji	Ramya, Ahul Silp	4:37
3.	"Blackberry New Bike"	Chirravuri Vijay Kumar	Prudhvi Chandra	3:29
4.	"O Subbammatha"	Chirravuri Vijay Kumar	Anjana Sowmya	4:07
5.	"Manushulatho Jagratha"	Chirravuri Vijay Kumar	Vandemataram Srinivas, Uma Neha	3:52
Total length:				19:39
