= Relangi Narasimha Rao =

Indian film director and screenwriter

Relangi Narsimha Rao
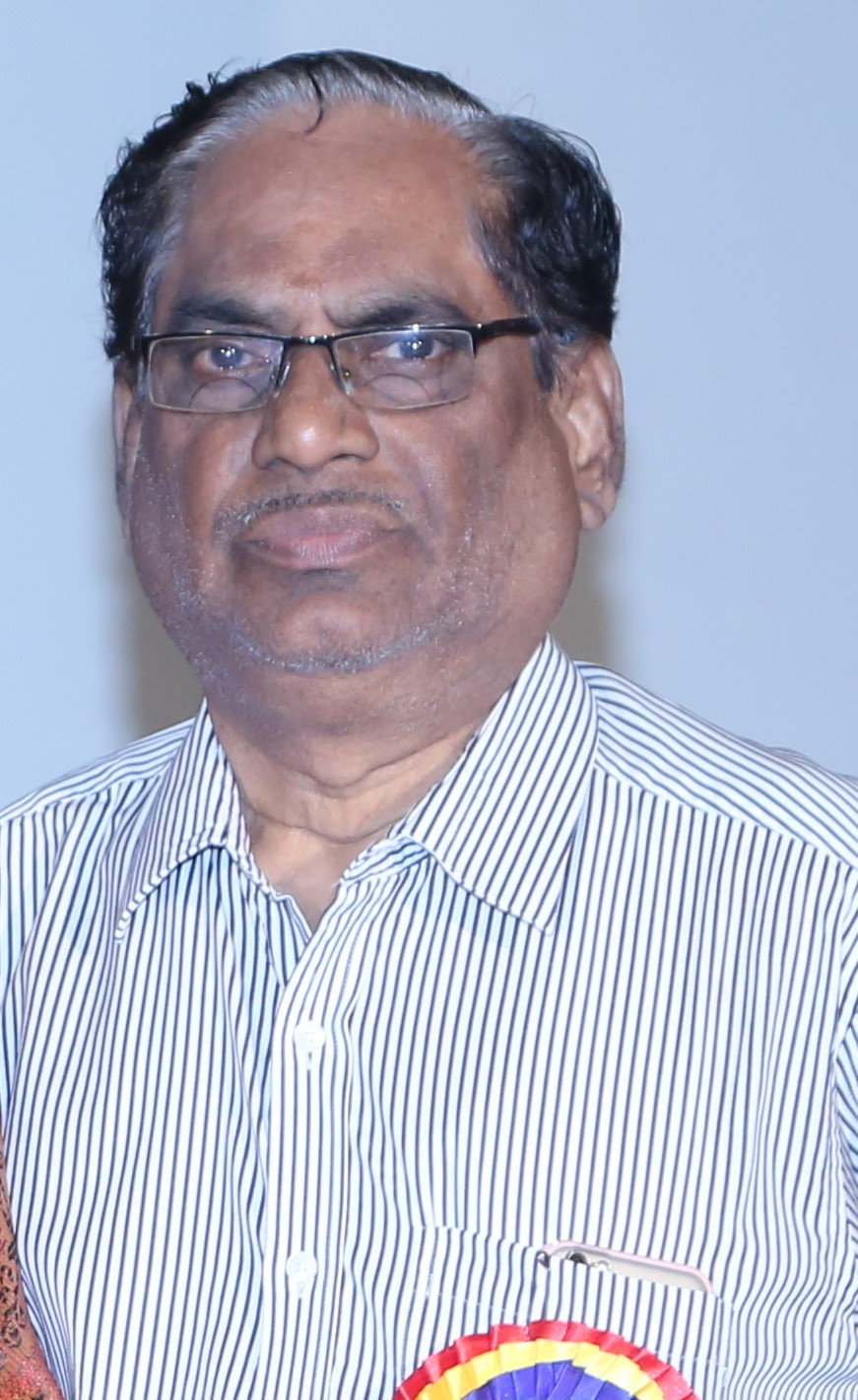
- Born: 30 September 1951 (age 75); Palakollu, Madras State, India
- Occupation: Film director

Relangi Narasimha Rao (born 30 September 1951) is an Indian film director and screenwriter who predominantly works in Telugu cinema. He is well known for his comedy films, especially his collaborations with actors Chandra Mohan and Rajendra Prasad. His notable films include Gundammagari Krishnulu (1987), Dabbevariki Chedu (1987), Samsaram (1988), Chinnodu Peddodu (1988), Mama Alludu (1990), Police Bharya (1990), Iddaru Pellala Muddula Police (1991), Edurinti Mogudu Pakkinti Pellam (1991).

He has directed over 70 films, mostly in Telugu, seven films in Kannada, as well as one film in Tamil. He also directed two TV series in Telugu. He won a Nandi Award for Best Screenplay Writer for the film Sundari Subbarao (1984), which he directed too. He introduced writers like Diwakar Babu and Sankaramanchi Parthasarathy. He also introduced Telugu cinema actors like Suman, Revathy, and Kinnera to Telugu cinema.

== Career ==
=== Director of comedy films ===
Narasimha Rao made his directorial debut in 1980 with the Telugu film Chandamama. It was a family drama. But the release of the film was delayed and was not screened until the year 1982. His second, third and fourth films, Nenu Maa Avida (1981), Evandoi Sreemathigaru, and Illantha Sandadi, were all successful comedies and he earned a reputation for directing low-budget clean comedies.

=== Entry into Kannada cinema ===
Narasimha Rao directed the Telugu films Iddaru Pellala Muddula Police and Edurinti Mogudu Pakkinti Pellam, both from 1991. These films paved the way for his foray into Kannada cinema. Over the next five years, Narasimha Rao directed seven films in Kannada. He was invited to remake the two Telugu films into Kannada in 1992. Iddaru Pellala Muddula Police was remade as Ibbaru Hendira Muddina Police and Edurinti Mogudu Pakkinti Pellam was remade as Edurmaneli Ganda Pakkadmaneli Hendthi. Both the films starred Kannada actor Shashi Kumar. He went on to direct five more Kannada movies - Hendthi Helidare Kelabeku, Geluvina Saradara, Ibbara Naduve Muddina Aata, Raja and Enondre.

== Other works and achievements ==
He was awarded the Nandi Award for Best Screenplay Writer along with writer Adi Vishnu for the film Sundari Subbarao (1984).

He was also adjudged Best Low Budget Director in the year 1991 by the Delhi Telugu Academy.

He acted as the Asian Panorama Jury Member for the 15th International Children's Film Festival by CFSI in 2007. He was also a Jury Chairman for the Nandi Television Awards for the years 2005–2006.

He directed a few TV series in Telugu including Bujji Bujjibabu for ETV in 2008.

== Filmography ==
=== Director ===
1. Nenu Maa Avida (1981)
2. Evandoy Srimatigaaru
3. Chandamama
4. Illantaa Sandadi
5. Mugguru Ammayila Mogudu
6. Iddaru Kiladilu
7. Ramarajyam Vachchindi
8. Tella Gulabeelu
9. Manasa Veena
10. Sundari Subba Rao
11. Muchataga Mugguru
12. Siksha
13. Samsaram O Sangeetam
14. Konte Kapuram
15. O Inti Kapuram
16. Kaboye Alludu
17. Dabbevariki Chedu
18. Rotation Chakravarti
19. Manmadha Leela Kamaraju Gola
20. Gundamma Gari Krishnulu
21. Bhale Mogudu
22. Premaku Padi Sutralu
23. Chilipi Dampatulu
24. Samsaram
25. Bhama Kalapam
26. Thodallullu
27. Chinnodu Peddodu
28. Chikkadu Dorakadu
29. Jeevana Jyothi
30. Sahasam Cheyara Dimbhaka
31. Poola Rangadu
32. Pelli Chesi Choodu
33. Pelli Kodukulostunnaru
34. Chalaki Mogudu Chadastapu Pellam
35. Yama Dharma Raju
36. Ramba Rambabu
37. Police Bharya
38. Mama Alludu
39. Irugillu Porugillu
40. Padmavati Kalyanam
41. Dagudumuthala Dampathyam
42. Srivari Chindulu
43. Iddaru Pellala Muddula Police
44. Edurinti Mogudu Pakkinti Pellam
45. Attintlo Adde Mogudu
46. Mogudu Pellala Dongaata
47. Samsarala Mechanic
48. Pellaniki Premalekha Priyuraliki Subhalekha
49. Kannayya Kittayya
50. Pellam Chaatu Mogudu
51. Chillara Mogudu Allari Koduku
52. Yenti Bava Mareenu
53. Ibbaru Hendthira Muddina Police (Kannada film)
54. Edurmaneli Ganda Pakkadmaneli Hendthi (Kannada film)
55. Rendu Pondatti Kaavalkaaran (Tamil film)
56. Pellama Majaka
57. Bramhachari Mogudu
58. Hendthi Helidare Kelabeku (Kannada film)
59. Parugo Parugu
60. Kurradi Kurradu
61. Sundara Vadana Subbalakshmi Moguda
62. Idandee Maavaari Varasa
63. Ketu Duplicatu
64. Enondre (Kannada film)
65. Geluvina Sardara (Kannada film)
66. Ibbara Naduve Muddina Aata (Kannada film)
67. High Class Atta Low Class Allullu
68. Raja (Kannada film)
69. Ulta Palta
70. Chinni Chinni Aasa
71. Ammo Bomma (2001)
72. Apparao Ki Oka Nela Thappindi
73. Preminchukunnam Pelliki Randi (2004)
74. Appu Chesi Pappu Koodu (2008)
75. Eluka Majaka (2016)
76. Oo Antava Maava Oo Ooo Antava Maavaa (2023)

=== Assistant director ===
- Sita Ramulu (1980)

Director of comedy sequences

- Pagale Vennela (2007)
