= Rambha Rambabu =

- Directed by: Relangi Narasimha Rao
- Written by: Paatibandla Ananda Rao (dialogues)
- Screenplay by: Relangi Narasimha Rao
- Story by: Relangi Narasimha Rao
- Produced by: G. Mattayya; M. S. R. Prasad
- Starring: Rajendra Prasad; Chandra Mohan; Parijaata
- Cinematography: Kabirlal
- Edited by: Murali-Ramaiah
- Music by: Madhavapeddi Suresh
- Production company: Sri Lakshmi Durga Movies
- Release date: 9 February 1990
- Running time: 125 minutes
- Country: India
- Language: Telugu

Rambha Rambabu is a 1990 Telugu-language fantasy comedy film, produced by G. Mattayya and M. S. R. Prasad under the Sri Lakshmi Durga Movies banner and directed by Relangi Narasimha Rao. It stars Rajendra Prasad, Chandra Mohan and Parijaata, with music composed by Madhavapedhi Suresh. The film was recorded as a hit at the box office. The film is based on Tamil film Rambaiyin Kaadhal (1956).

== Cast ==
- Rajendra Prasad as Rambabu
- Parijaata as Rambha
- Chandra Mohan as Narada Maharshi
- Dasari Narayana Rao as Yama Dharma Raju
- Suthi Velu as Garalakantam
- Raavi Kondala Rao as Chitra Gupta
- Sakshi Ranga Rao as Priest
- Thyagaraju as Bhetalla
- K. K. Sarma
- Kaasi Viswanath
- Srilakshmi as Sarva Mangalam
- Kakinada Shyamala as Janakamma
- Sridevi as Chittitalli

== Soundtrack ==
Ramba Rambabu

Film score by Madhavapedhi Suresh
- Released: 1990
- Genre: Soundtrack
- Length: 19:37
- Label: Cauvery Audio
- Producer: Madhavapedhi Suresh

Music composed by Madhavapedhi Suresh and it is released on Cauvery Audio Company.

S. No.	Song title	Lyrics	Singers	length
1	"Rambha Rambha"	Acharya Aatreya	Mano, S. P. Sailaja	4:52
2	"Priyatham Piluvakumaa"	Mullapudi Sastry	P. Susheela	4:22
3	"Koora Koora Gongoora"	Acharya Aatreya	S. P. Balasubrahmanyam, P. Susheela	4:29
4	"Balamani Raave"	Acharya Aatreya	Mano	4:45
5	"Vagdanamulu" (Padyam)	Paatibandla Ananda Rao	Madhavapeddi Ramesh	1:09
