= Dagudumuthala Dampathyam =

- Theatrical release poster
- Directed by: Relangi Narasimha Rao
- Written by: Satyanand (dialogues)
- Screenplay by: Relangi Narasimha Rao
- Story by: Srinivasa Chakravarthy
- Produced by: B. V. S. N. Prasad
- Starring: Akkineni Nageswara Rao; Rajendra Prasad; Sharada; Vani Viswanath; Ramya Krishna
- Cinematography: Sarath
- Edited by: Kotagiri Venkateswara Rao
- Music by: M. M. Keeravani
- Production company: Sri Vijaya Prasanna Pictures
- Release date: 1990
- Running time: 130 mins
- Country: India
- Language: Telugu

Dagudumuthala Dampathyam is a 1990 Indian Telugu-language comedy film, produced by Bogavalli Prasad and directed by Relangi Narasimha Rao. Starring Akkineni Nageswara Rao, Rajendra Prasad, Sharada, Vani Viswanath, Ramya Krishna, and music composed by M. M. Keeravani. The film recorded as Super Hit at the box office.

== Cast ==
- Akkineni Nageswara Rao as Raja Shekaram
- Rajendra Prasad as Kishtaiah
- Sharada as Lalitha
- Vani Viswanath as Rekha
- Ramya Krishna as Radha
- Satyanarayana as Major Narasimham
- Gummadi as Gopalam
- Suthi Velu as Dr. Tikka Makka Rao
- Raavi Kondala Rao as Prof. Bhairava Murthy
- Ashok Kumar as Madman
- Y. Vijaya as Sundaramma
- Nirmalamma as Seetamma

== Crew ==
- Art: Bhaskar Raju
- Choreography: Taara
- Stills: Sabastian Brothers
- Dialogues: Satyanand
- Lyrics: Veturi
- Playback: S. P. Balasubrahmanyam, Mano, Chitra, Ramola
- Music: M. M. Keeravani
- Story: Srinivasa Chakravarthy
- Editing: Kotagiri Venkateswara Rao
- Cinematography: Sarath
- Producer: Bogavalli Prasad
- Screenplay - Director: Relangi Narasimha Rao
- Banner: Sri Vijaya Prasanna Pictures
- Release Date: 1990

== Soundtrack ==
Dagudumuthala Dampathyam

Film score by M. M. Keeravani
- Released: 1990
- Genre: Soundtrack
- Length: 20:13
- Label: Surya Music
- Producer: M. M. Keeravani

M. M. Keeravani chronology
Dagudumuthala Dampathyam (1990)	Seetharamayya Gari Manavaralu (1991)

Music was composed by M. M. Keeravani. Lyrics were written by Veturi. Music released on Surya Music Company.

S. No.	Song title	Singers	length
1	"Malli Yavvana"	S. P. Balasubrahmanyam, Ramana	3:57
2	"Gusa Gusa"	S. P. Balasubrahmanyam, Chitra	3:21
3	"Gonthemma"	Mano, Chitra	4:16
4	"Mapatela Puttanu"	Chitra	4:19
5	"Oka Maata"	S. P. Balasubrahmanyam, Chitra	4:20
