= Rajendra Prasad (actor) =

Indian actor(born 19 July 1956)

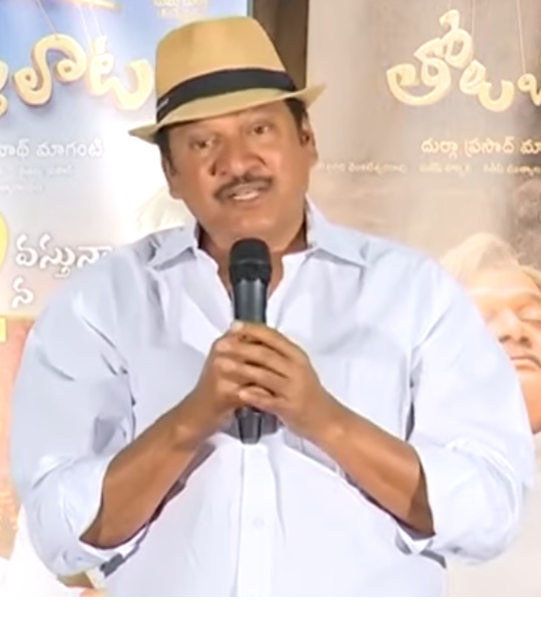
- Rajendra Prasad in 2019
- Born: Gadde Babu Rajendra Prasad; 19 July 1956 (age 70); Nimmakuru, Andhra State, India
- Occupations: Actor; Comedian
- Years active: 1977–present
- Spouse: Vijaya Chamundeswari
- Children: 2
- Relatives: Rama Prabha (mother-in-law)
- Awards: Padma Shri (2026)

Gadde Babu Rajendra Prasad (born 19 July 1956) is an Indian actor known for his work predominantly in Telugu cinema. Prasad made his debut in 1977 with Sneham and gained recognition with Manchu Pallaki (1982). He then went on to star in several successful comedy films such as Rendu Rellu Aaru (1986), Ladies Tailor (1986), Aha Naa-Pellanta! (1987), Appula Appa Rao (1992), and Mayalodu (1993). He received a Nandi Award for Best Actor for Erra Mandaram (1991) and Aa Naluguru (2004). He has also received an Honorary doctorate from Andhra University. He turned music director for Topi Raja Sweety Roja (1996).

In 2012, he starred in the medical thriller Dream, for which he won the Royal Reel Award at the Canada International Film Festival. He is fondly called "Nata Kireeti" and has been honored with the title "Hasya Kireeti" by the Telugu Alliances of Canada, in Mississauga. He was also honored to walk the green carpet at the IIFA film festival held in 2009, marking his performance in the English-language film, Quick Gun Murugun.

He is a recipient of four state Nandi Awards, three SIIMA Awards, and three Santosham Film Awards. In 2026, he was awarded the Padma Shri, India's fourth highest civilian honour, for his contribution to Indian cinema.

== Early life ==
Prasad was born into a middle-class family, to Gadde Venkata Narayana and Manikyamba, in Nimmakuru, Andhra Pradesh. His parents hailed from Dondapadu, Gudivada mandal, Krishna district, Andhra Pradesh. His father was a teacher. Prasad graduated with a diploma in ceramic engineering before entering the film industry. He joined a company but had to resign from the job because he was too young. After witnessing the shooting of Tatamma Kala, he aspired to join the industry. Upon the suggestion of brothers N.T.R and N. Trivikrama Rao, he joined an acting school.

== Personal life ==
Prasad is married to Vijaya Chamundeswari, who is the niece and adoptive daughter of actress Rama Prabha. They have a son and a daughter. Their daughter Gayatri died on 4 October 2024 due to a heart attack.

== Career ==
=== Early career (1977 – 1985) ===
Prasad made his debut as an actor on the silver screen with the film Sneham (1977), directed by Bapu. Initially, he worked as a dubbing artist and played many supporting roles. He played a supporting role in the film Ramarajyamlo Bheemaraju, starring Krishna, which fetched him a chance in 14 films.

=== Breakthrough as a lead & comedy actor (1985 – 2004) ===
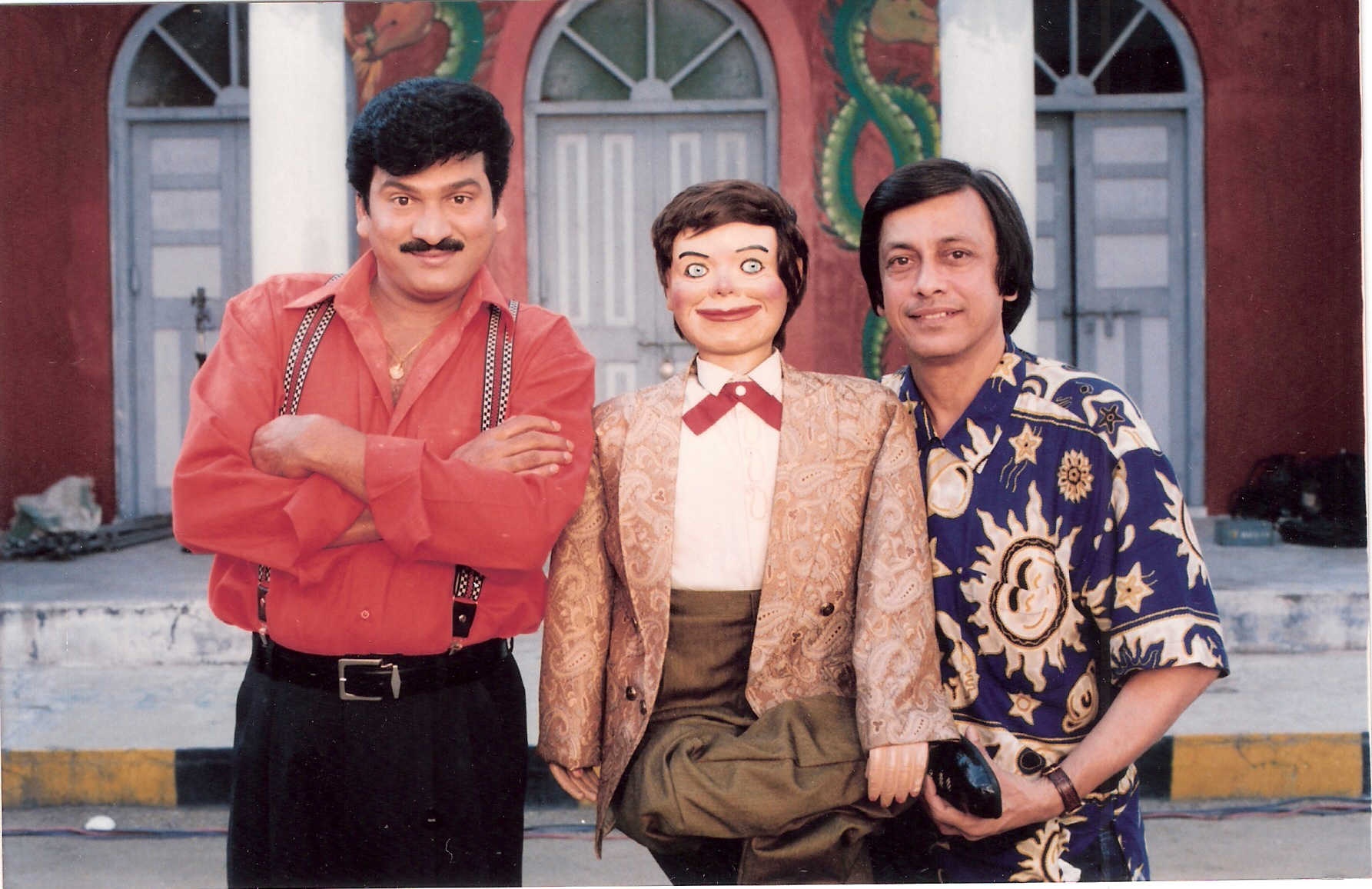
Prasad with ventriloquist Ramdas Padhye during the filming of Ammo Bomma (2001).

He was identified by director Vamsy to play a lead role in his film, Preminchu Pelladu. He rose to fame with Vamsy's Ladies Tailor. He continued to act in supporting roles while also playing lead roles. In a career of over 45 years, he acted in more than 200 Telugu films and few Tamil films. Prasad has been called a great comedy actor and is fondly called the King of Comedy and Natakireeti in Andhra Pradesh.

His collaboration with the director Jandhyala in Aha Naa Pellanta established him as an overnight star. He also made successful collaborations with directors Vamsy, E. V. V. Satyanarayana, S. V. Krishna Reddy and Relangi Narasimha Rao. Notably, Relangi made 32 films (out of 70 as a director) with Prasad.

=== Critically acclaimed roles (2004 – 2011) ===
One major role which garnered him a lot of accolades was in the movie Aa Naluguru, for which he won the State Nandi Award for the second time in his career. Critically acclaimed films such as Mee Sreyobhilashi and Onamalu made him one of the most promising actors in Telugu film industry. He acted as Lord Hanuman in the blockbuster multi-star film Devullu.

In 2009, Prasad played the titular role in the English-language film, Quick Gun Murugun. The film was screened at the London Film Festival, the Indian Film Festival of Los Angeles, the New York Asian Film Festival and at The Museum of Modern Art, New York.

=== Supporting roles (2011 – present) ===
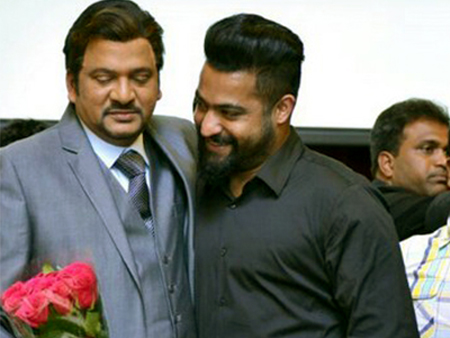
Prasad celebrating his birthday on the sets of Nannaku Prematho (2016) with Jr. NTR.

He played remarkable characters as supporting artist in films such as Julai, Aagadu, S/O Satyamurthy, Srimanthudu and Nannaku Prematho as well as elderly characters in films like Dagudumoota Dandakore.

Telugu people who emigrated abroad would take Prasad's movies along with them, such was the popularity and impact of his films on at least two generations of Telugu people. The then prime minister P. V. Narasimha Rao too was a huge fan of Prasad.

In 2015, he was elected President of Movie Artist Association (MAA), over actress Jayasudha.

His recent film, Senapathi, is currently streaming on Aha.

== Awards ==
Civilian honors

- Padma Shri (2026)

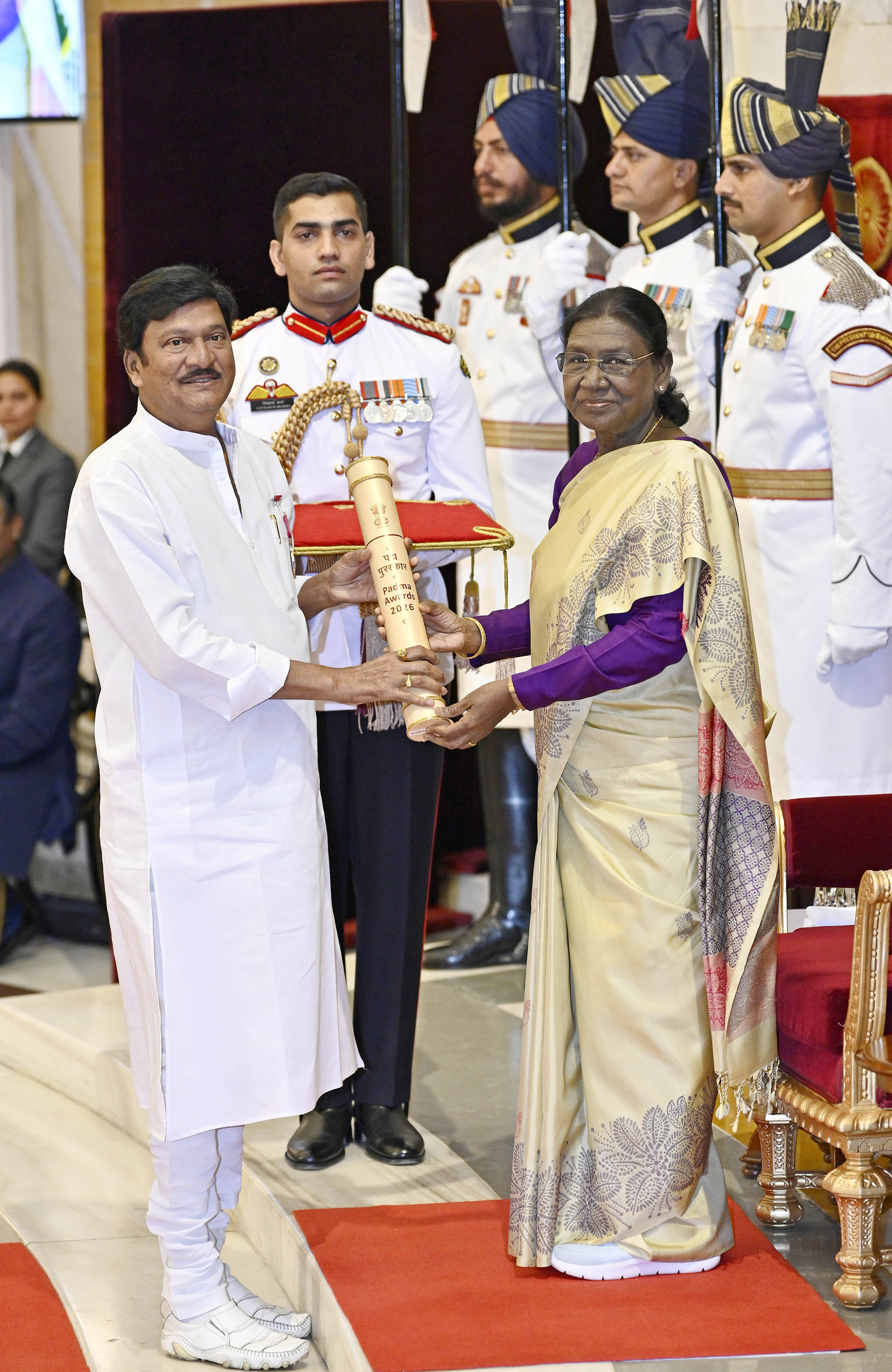
The President of India, Smt. Droupadi Murmu presenting the Padma Shri Award to Shri Gadde Babu Rajendra Prasad at the Civil Investiture Ceremony-II at Rashtrapati Bhavan, in New Delhi on June 23, 2026.

Nandi Awards

- Nandi Award for Best Actor (1991) for Erra Mandaram
- Nandi Special Jury Award (1994) for Madam
- Nandi Award for Best Actor (2004) for Aa Naluguru
- Nandi Award for Best Character Actor (2014) for Tommy

South Indian International Movie Awards

- SIIMA Award for Best Supporting Actor (Telugu) (2013) for Julai at 2nd SIIMA
- SIIMA Award for Best Supporting Actor (Telugu) (2016) for Srimanthudu at 5th SIIMA
- SIIMA Award for Best Supporting Actor (Telugu) (2019) for Mahanati at 8th SIIMA

CineMAA Awards

- CineMAA Award for Best Outstanding Actor – Onamalu (2013)

=== Santosham Film Awards ===
- Best Supporting Actor for Mahanati at 17th Santosham Film Awards 2019
- Santosham Akkineni Nageswara Rao Smarakam Award at 16th Santosham Film Awards 2018
- Best Supporting Actor for Srimanthudu at 14th Santosham Film Awards 2016
