= Bhairava Dweepam =

1994 film by Singeetam Srinivasa Rao

- Theatrical release poster
- Directed by: Singeetam Srinivasa Rao
- Written by: Raavi Kondala Rao; Singeetam Srinivasa Rao
- Produced by: B. Venkatrama Reddy
- Starring: Nandamuri Balakrishna; Roja
- Cinematography: Kabir Lal
- Edited by: D. Raja Gopal
- Music by: Madhavapeddi Suresh
- Production company: Chandamama Vijaya Combines
- Release date: 14 April 1994
- Running time: 162 minutes
- Country: India
- Language: Telugu
- Budget: ₹4.5 crore

Bhairava Dweepam (transl. 'Bhairava's island') is a 1994 Indian Telugu-language high fantasy film co-written and directed by Singeetam Srinivasa Rao. Starring Nandamuri Balakrishna and Roja in lead roles, the film features Vijaya Rangaraja as the titular antagonist, Bhairava. The supporting cast includes K. R. Vijaya, Vijayakumar, Kaikala Satyanarayana, and Babu Mohan. The story follows Vijay, a young man raised by a tribal chieftain, who embarks on a mission to rescue Princess Padmavati from the evil wizard Bhairava.

Produced by B. Venkatrama Reddy under the Chandamama Vijaya Pictures banner, Bhairava Dweepam aimed to revive the folklore-fantasy genre in Telugu cinema. Raavi Kondala Rao co-wrote the script with director Srinivasa Rao and oversaw the film's production. Filming began in June 1993, with principal photography taking place at Vijaya Vauhini Studios and various challenging outdoor locations, including a waterfall in Kemmangundi. The production, which spanned 240 days with a budget of ₹4.5 crore, faced significant logistical challenges. Cinematography was handled by Kabir Lal, and the film predominantly relied on practical effects, supplemented by a limited use of visual graphics.

Released in April 1994, Bhairava Dweepam was a major commercial success, completing a 100-day theatrical run in 28 centres. It also achieved a 50-day run in 59 centres during its initial release, setting a record for a Telugu film at the time. The film received critical acclaim and won ten Nandi Awards, including Best Director for Singeetam Srinivasa Rao. It was dubbed into Tamil as Vijaya Prathapan and also into Hindi. The film is regarded as a landmark in Telugu fantasy cinema.

== Plot ==
The film begins in the Chandraprabha Dynasty with King Jayachandra deserting a woman, Vasundhara, after she gives birth to a baby boy. Distraught, Jayachandra searches for her, but on a stormy night, Vasundhara loses her child, who is then found and raised by a tribal chieftain as Vijay. Shattered, Vasundhara attempts suicide but is saved by a hermit, Jamadagni, who consoles her and gives her a flower that will bloom as long as her son is alive. Years pass, and Vijay grows into a brave and courteous young man.

Vijay's foster family aspires to obtain a divine liquid from a special tree that grants youthfulness. He sets off with his brother Kondanna, where he meets and falls in love with Princess Padmavati, the daughter of King Brahmananda Bhupathi, who reciprocates his feelings. One night, Vijay sneaks into the palace to meet Padmavati, successfully evading the guards. Meanwhile, Jayachandra is blinded, and his foolish sons, Uttar and Dakshin, take over the throne, exiling him to the desert. Brahmananda invites the princes to a Swayamvaram to marry Padmavati, honouring a promise to Jayachandra. Vijay, disguised as a prince, attends with Kondanna. When his true identity is revealed, he flees, but Padmavati declares her intention to marry him.

The story shifts to Bhairava Dweepam, a mystical island where the malevolent wizard Bhairava seeks immortality. He believes that sacrificing a virgin born at sunrise under the Revati star and the Pisces zodiac sign will grant him immense powers. Acting on this belief, Bhairava abducts Padmavathi, placing her under a trance and taking her to the island during a full moon night to perform the ritual.

The following morning, Padmavathi awakens with fragmented memories of the abduction and falls gravely ill. Doctors attribute her condition to black magic. Meanwhile, in the palace, Brahmananda accuses Vijay of being responsible for the events and has him imprisoned and tortured. Determined to save Padmavathi, Vijay escapes captivity and seeks refuge at Jamadagni's asram. There, Vasundhara nurses his injuries and gifts him a protective bracelet to shield him from evil forces on his quest to rescue Padmavathi.

On the full moon night, Vijay sneaks into the palace and sees a green fog transporting Padmavati. Protected by his bracelet, he follows the fog to the island. There, he breaks the curse of a nymph who gives him a ring that can reverse Bhairava's magic and warns him not to confront the wizard yet. Vijay uses the ring to bring Padmavati out of her trance and escapes with her on a magic bed. Bhairava attacks them with a Gandabherunda bird, causing Vijay to fall into the sea. A pair of mischievous devils find him and recount their past as Bhairava's servants, who were freed by the kick of a blind Jayachandra. Grateful, Jayachandra asks them for food, but a flying horse prevents him from eating as punishment. The devils request Vijay's help, and with his music, Vijay convinces the horse to restore Jayachandra's vision.

The horse grants Vijay a boon to transport him to mysterious places. The devils inform Vijay about a Satha-Ratna necklace that can protect Padmavati, located in Yakshinilokam. Vijay embarks on this journey, asking Jayachandra to stay in their village. Meanwhile, Brahmananda offers half his kingdom and Padmavati's hand to anyone who rescues her. With the help of four little people, Vijay reaches Yakshinilokam, deceives a Yakshiki, and wins the necklace after many challenges. Angered, the Yakshini curses Vijay, turning him into a vile creature, but tells him the necklace will be effective unless it falls or he reveals himself. At Jamadagni's asram, the flower darkens, worrying Vasundhara, but Jamadagni reassures her that her son is safe.

Vijay, in disguise, manages to place the necklace on Padmavati. Brahmananda reluctantly arranges a wedding between the cursed Vijay and Padmavati. Bhairava's acolyte, disguised as a priest, claims Vijay stole the necklace. Padmavati throws it away, and Bhairava abducts her. Vijay rushes to Jamadagni's asram for help, where Vasundhara recognizes him as her son. Following Jamadagni's instructions, Vijay calls the magic horse, but it cannot transport him due to the curse. Vasundhara takes on the curse, allowing Vijay to ride the horse to Bhairava Dweepam. Vijay defeats Bhairava, and the island collapses. The Goddess appears and lifts Vasundhara's curse. The film concludes with Vijay and Padmavati's marriage and the union of the Chandraprabha and Karthikeya dynasties.

== Cast ==
- Nandamuri Balakrishna as Vijay
- Roja as Padmavathi
- Satyanarayana as Brahmananda Bhupati
- Vijayakumar as Jayachandra Maharaju
- K. R. Vijaya as Vasundhara
- Vijaya Rangaraja as Bhairava
- Subhalekha Sudhakar as Dakshin
- Giri Babu as Uttar
- Babu Mohan as Kondanna
- Mikkilineni as Jamadagni Maharshi
- Padmanabham as Mattepa Sastry
- Malladi
- Suthi Velu as an Allari Deyyam
- Kovai Sarala as an Allari Deyyam
- Vinod as Soora Varma
- Bhimeswara Rao
- Chitti Babu as a Lilliputian
- Visweswara Rao as a Lilliputian
- Manorama
- Sangeeta as Padma's mother
- Radhabai
- Rajitha as Madanika
- Attili Lakshmi
- Sailaja
- Rambha as Yakshini (Cameo appearance)

== Production ==
=== Development ===
Bhairava Dweepam was produced by Chandamama Vijaya Combines, a production banner founded in 1991 by B. Venugopala Reddy, B. Viswanatha Reddy, and B. Venkatrama Reddy, the sons of producer B. Nagi Reddy, who was known for producing influential films like Pathala Bhairavi (1951). Inspired by their father's legacy and the success of Pathala Bhairavi, the brothers sought to revive the "janapada" (folklore fantasy) genre in Telugu cinema.

The company's first Telugu film, Brundavanam (1992), directed by Singeetam Srinivasa Rao, was a commercial success. Building on this, the brothers decided to produce Bhairava Dweepam as their second project, aiming to reinvigorate the folklore-fantasy genre, which had been underexplored since Mohini Sapatham (1986), directed by Vittalacharya. The film's title, Bhairava Dweepam, was inspired by Pathala Bhairavi, blending the elements of "Bhairavi" and "Dweepam" (meaning island) to pay homage to the classic.

Directed by Singeetam Srinivasa Rao, who had also directed Brundavanam, the film was produced under the presentation of Venugopala Reddy and Viswanatha Reddy, with Venkatrama Reddy serving as the producer. Raavi Kondala Rao, a journalist and actor with over 25 years of experience at Vijaya Productions, played a key role in the production of Bhairava Dweepam. In addition to overseeing production, he wrote the story, offering a fresh take on traditional folk tales, and also penned the dialogues. Singeetam Srinivasa Rao wrote the screenplay. Kondala Rao acknowledged the influence of Vijaya Productions' films and some Hollywood films on certain scenes.

=== Casting ===
Nandamuri Balakrishna, impressed by the story's resemblance to Pathala Bhairavi—which starred his father, N. T. Rama Rao—readily agreed to play the lead role. In the film, Balakrishna plays an adventurous young man who is cursed and becomes a hunchback, marking a shift from his usual mass hero roles. The fact that Balakrishna portrayed a hunchback character was kept under wraps until the film's release. The transformation required two hours of makeup, and Balakrishna followed a juice-based diet to minimize time spent in the makeup chair.

Roja, a leading actress of the time, was cast as the female lead. The film marked the first collaboration between Balakrishna and Roja, who would later go on to act together in several films. K. R. Vijaya and Vijayakumar were chosen to portray Balakrishna’s parents, while the supporting cast included Kaikala Satyanarayana, Sangeeta, Radha Kumari, and Babu Mohan. Rambha appeared in a special role as a Yakshini, and comic roles were performed by Giri Babu and Subhalekha Sudhakar. Visweswara Rao and Chitti Babu played the roles of little people.

For the role of the antagonist Bhairavudu, the filmmakers sought an actor with a strong screen presence similar to S. V. Ranga Rao. Initial considerations included Hindi actors Nana Patekar and Amrish Puri. Producer Venkatarama Reddy later decided to cast Malayalam actor Rajkumar after being impressed by his performance in the film Vietnam Colony (1992). Upon learning that Rajkumar was a Telugu person, the decision was finalized. He was introduced under the screen name "Vijaya Rangaraja" to align with the legacy of the Vijaya production house and S. V. Ranga Rao’s contributions.

=== Filming ===
Principal photography for Bhairava Dweepam commenced on 25 June 1993, with an opening ceremony held at Vijaya Vauhini Studios in Madras (now Chennai). The event was attended by prominent figures, including Rajinikanth, who gave the ceremonial clap, Chiranjeevi, who switched on the camera, and N. T. Rama Rao, who provided honorary direction. The first shot was filmed with lead actors Balakrishna and Roja. Kabir Lal, who had worked with director Srinivasa Rao on Aditya 369 (1991), handled cinematography for the film. After the opening ceremony, the song "Naruda O Naruda," featuring Balakrishna and Rambha, was filmed. Due to shots involving dwarf characters, the song took about a month to complete.

The production moved to a challenging site for a key sequence filmed at a waterfall near Kemmangundi in the Chikmagalur district of Karnataka. Surrounded by towering hills, the location required the construction of a shrine and a statue of Goddess Parvati. These sequences, featuring Balakrishna, K. R. Vijaya, and Mikkilineni, were accompanied by the song "Ambaa Sambhavi." Accessing the remote location posed significant logistical challenges. The team had to undertake a car ride followed by a Jeep journey and then trek 1 kilometre through water, crossing a bridge to reach the site. The crew faced additional difficulties from leeches in the water, necessitating the use of lime to repel them. While Balakrishna and K. R. Vijaya managed the trek with assistance, 80-year-old Mikkilineni required the support of four assistants daily. The site's geography further complicated the filming process. Due to the surrounding hills, the area received sunlight only between 12 PM and 2 PM, allowing for a limited shooting window. Without artificial lighting, outdoor scenes, including the song, had to be completed within this brief timeframe. Additional scenes, including horse chase sequences, were filmed in the forest near the waterfall.

The action sequences involving horses were filmed using tripping wires to create the effect of horses falling during arrow attacks. While this technique effectively depicted the required visuals, it posed risks of injury to the animals, including potential broken legs. To mitigate this, handlers and horse owners promptly checked the horses after filming and provided veterinary care when necessary. During the censor review, these scenes were highlighted, with the board clearing the film without cuts but cautioning that animal rights activists might raise concerns. However, the scenes ultimately avoided scrutiny and were retained in the final release.

Indoor sequences were filmed at Vijaya Vauhini Studios. One particularly challenging scene, featuring a mirror demon, required significant effort from cinematographer Kabir Lal. Night shoots were conducted for scenes involving a flying bed to achieve the desired effect. Large cranes were used for sequences involving the Gandabherunda bird, while small figurines were created for the dwarf characters. These figurines were remotely controlled by engineers to simulate climbing movements.

For the song "Sri Tumbura Naarada," Balakrishna dedicated considerable time to rehearsing the gamakas and lyrics. He would travel to Marina Beach in Madras early every morning for practice. The film, one of the earliest Telugu productions to utilize computer graphics, incorporated a limited amount of visuals due to the technological limitations of the time. These graphics were created by experts trained in the United States. The production spanned 240 days and was completed on a budget of approximately ₹4.5 crore.

== Music ==
Bhairava Dweepam

Film score by Madhavapeddi Suresh
- Released: 1994
- Genre: Soundtrack
- Length: 29:17
- Label: Supreme Music
- Producer: Madhavapeddi Suresh

Madhavapeddi Suresh chronology
Madam (1993)	Bhairava Dweepam (1994)	Maatho Pettukoku (1995)

The music for Bhairava Dweepam was composed by Madhavapeddi Suresh, with the audio soundtrack released under the Supreme Music Company label. The music received critical acclaim and played a key role in the film's success. Thaman, then aged 10, played drums for the film as part of the recording team.

The soundtrack features six songs, including two duets and four solo tracks. The selection of songs took nearly three months to finalize. "Amba Sambhavi" was composed in Hamsanandi raga, and "Naruda O Naruda" was composed in Sindu Bhairavi raga. "Virisinadi Vasanta Gaanam," composed in Mohanakalyani raga, has lyrics written by director Singeetam Srinivasa Rao.

The song "Sri Tumbura Narada" was modelled after "Siva Sankari" from Jagadekaveeruni Katha (1961). It was composed in a blend of ragas such as Abheri, Mohana, Hindolam, Saraswati, Chakravakam, and Kalyani, and became an instant success. Veturi, known for his quick lyric-writing, took a week to complete the lyrics. Madhavapeddi Suresh spent a month composing and recording the music.

Among the duet songs, "Entha Entha Vintha Mohamo," composed in Brindavani Sarang raga, was sung by Sandhya, the niece of P. Suseela. The other duet, "Ghataina Prema Ghatana," was composed in Shuddha Saveri raga.

No.	Title	Lyrics	Singer(s)	Length
1.	"Entha Entha Vintha Mohamo"	Sirivennela Sitarama Sastry	S.P. Balasubrahmanyam, Sandhya	5:46
2.	"Ghataina Prema Ghatana"	Sirivennela Sitarama Sastry	S. P. Balasubrahmanyam, Chitra	3:54
3.	"Sri Thumbura Naaradha"	Veturi	S. P. Balasubrahmanyam	5:51
4.	"Virisinadhee Vasanta Gaanam"	Singeetham Srinivasa Rao	Chitra	4:59
5.	"Narudaa O Narudaa"	Veturi	S. Janaki	4:34
6.	"Ambaa Sambhavi"	Vaddepalli Krishna	S. Janaki	4:02
Total length:				29:17

== Reception ==
=== Box office ===
Bhairava Dweepam was cleared by the censor board without any cuts and released on 14 April 1994. Despite initial skepticism within the industry about the viability of a folklore film in the 1990s, the film emerged as a commercial success, completing a theatrical run of over 100 days in 28 centres. It also achieved a 50-day run in 59 centres during its initial release, setting a record for a Telugu film at the time. The film performed well even in some smaller towns of Karnataka and Orissa. Its silver jubilee celebration was held at the Vijaya Seshamahal in Madras. The film was later dubbed into Tamil as Vijaya Prathapan, achieving success in Tamil Nadu. It was also dubbed in Hindi.

The success of Bhairava Dweepam bolstered the confidence of the production team, inspiring them to collaborate again on a mythological film, Sri Krishnarjuna Vijayam (1996). However, this venture failed to replicate the success of its predecessor.

=== Critical response ===
The film was praised for its costumes, music and technicality. K. Vijiyan of New Straits Times while reviewing the Tamil dubbed version Vijaya Prathapan praised Balakrishna's performance, the special effects and production design, calling it an "enjoyable 'raja-rani' film".

== Legacy ==
Bhairava Dweepam is considered a significant film in Telugu fantasy cinema, drawing on elements of Telugu folklore. In 2020, Vogue India called it a standout fantasy film and listed it among seven must-watch Telugu films for fantasy fans. Film Companion also praised it as one of the better examples of the genre, highlighting its imaginative aspects like a flying bed and a swashbuckling hero.

The film has left a lasting impact on the industry. Director Venkatesh Maha credited Bhairava Dweepam with significantly influencing his childhood and career, commending its boldness and the unique emotional response it evoked in him. Additionally, director Nag Ashwin has cited Bhairava Dweepam, alongside Aditya 369, as among his favourite films. Actor and producer Nandamuri Kalyan Ram has acknowledged the film as an inspiration for his 2022 project, Bimbisara.

== Awards ==
Nandi Awards

- Third Best Feature Film – Bronze – B. Venkatarami Reddy
- Best Director – Singeetam Srinivas Rao
- Best Actress - Roja
- Best Male Playback Singer – S. P. Balasubrahmanyam for the song "Sri Thumabara Narada"
- Best Female Playback Singer – S. Janaki for the song "Naruda O Naruda Yemi Korikaa"
- Best Makeup Artist – M. Sathyam
- Best Costume Designer – Kondala Reddy
- Best Audiographer – Kolli Ramakrishna
- Best Art Director – Peketi Ranga
- Special Jury Award – Kabir Lal for Best Photography
