= Nandi Awards of 2015 =

Indian Telugu film and TV awards ceremony

Nandi Awards for the year 2015 announced by Andhra Pradesh Government on 14 November 2017. The S. S. Rajamouli starrer Baahubali: The Beginning emerged as a big winner with a record 13 awards for the year. The NTR National award for the year was conferred on director K. Raghavendra Rao.

The Awards Ceremony was held in Amaravati.

== Winners list ==
Category	Winner	Film	Nandi Type
Best Feature Film	Shobu Yarlagadda; Prasad Devineni	Baahubali: The Beginning	Gold
Best Feature Film (Second)	Priyanka Dutt	Yevade Subramanyam	Silver
Best Feature Film (Third)	Sravanti Ravi Kishore	Nenu Sailaja	Bronze
Best Family Entertainment Film	Naveen Yerneni Yalamanchili Ravi Shankar C. V. Mohan	Srimanthudu	Copper
Best Actor	Mahesh Babu	Srimanthudu	Silver
Best Director	S. S. Rajamouli	Baahubali: The Beginning	Silver
Best Actress	Anushka Shetty	Size Zero	Silver
Best Supporting Actor	Posani Krishna Murali	Temper	Copper
Best Supporting Actress	Ramya Krishnan	Baahubali: The Beginning	Copper
Best Character Actor	Allu Arjun	Rudramadevi	Copper
Best Male Comedian	Vennela Kishore	Bhale Bhale Magadivoy	Copper
Best Female Comedian	Snigdha	Jatha Kalise	Copper
Best Villain	Rana Daggubati	Baahubali: The Beginning	Copper
Best Cinematographer	K. K. Senthil Kumar	Baahubali: The Beginning	Copper
Best Music Director	M. M. Keeravani	Baahubali: The Beginning	Copper
Best Editor	Navin Nooli	Ladies and Gentlemen	Copper
Best Art Director	Sabu Cyril	Baahubali: The Beginning	Copper
Best Screenplay Writer	Kishore Tirumala	Nenu Sailaja	Copper
Best Story Writer			Copper
Best Dialogue Writer	Sai Madhav Burra	Malli Malli Idi Rani Roju	Copper
Best Lyricist	Ramajogayya Sastry	Srimanthudu	Copper
Nandi Award for Akkineni Award for best home-viewing feature film	K. A. Vallabha	Malli Malli Idi Rani Roju	Silver
Best Popular Film for Providing Wholesome Entertainment	Mahesh Babu; Y. Naveen; C. V. Mohan; Y. Ravi Shankar	Srimanthudu	Gold
Best Children's Film			Gold
Best Documentary Film		Sitavalokanam	Gold
Best Film Critic on Telugu Cinema	Dr. K. Ravi Chandran		Copper
Sarojini Devi Award for a Film on National Integration	Y. Rajeev Reddy; J. Sai Babu	Kanche	Gold
Best Male Playback Singer	M. M. Keeravani	Baahubali: The Beginning	Copper
Best Female Playback Singer	Chinmayi	Malli Malli Idi Rani Roju	Copper
Best Child Actor	Master NTR	Dhana Veera Sura Karna	Copper
Best Child Actress	Baby Karunya	Dhana Veera Sura Karna	Copper
Best First Film of a Director	Nag Ashwin	Yevade Subramanyam	Copper
Best Choreographer	Prem Rakshith	Baahubali: The Beginning	Copper
Best Audiographer	P. M. Sateesh	Baahubali: The Beginning	Copper
Best Costume Designer	Rama Rajamouli; Prashanti Tipirneni	Baahubali: The Beginning	Copper
Best Makeup Artist	R. Madhava Rao	Dhana Veera Shura Karna	Copper
Best Fight Master	Peter Hein	Baahubali: The Beginning	Copper
Best Special Effects	V. Srinivas Mohan	Baahubali: The Beginning	Copper
Best Male Dubbing Artist	P. Ravi Shankar	Baahubali: The Beginning	Copper
Best Female Dubbing Artist	Sowmya	Rudramadevi	Copper
Nandi Award for Best Book on Telugu Cinema (Books, posters, etc.)		Telugu Cinema lo Dubbing Paatalu	Copper
Special Jury Award	Nithya Menon	Malli Malli Idi Rani Roju	Copper
Special Jury Award	Sharwanand	Malli Malli Idi Rani Roju	Copper
Special Jury Award	Vijay Devarakonda	Yevade Subramanyam	Copper

== Controversy ==
Director Ram Gopal Varma and Gunasekhar criticised that the selection of awards are biased, the Rudhramadevi (film), which is about women empowerment was not considered as best films.

== See also ==
- Nandi Awards of 2013
