= Maatho Pettukoku =

1995 Indian film by A. Kodandarami Reddy

- DVD cover
- Directed by: A. Kodandarami Reddy
- Written by: Ganesh Patro (dialogues)
- Screenplay by: Ramani
- Story by: Bhargav Arts Unit
- Produced by: S. Gopal Reddy
- Starring: Nandamuri Balakrishna; Roja; Rambha
- Cinematography: V. S. R. Swamy
- Edited by: Tirunavukkarasu Narasimha Rao
- Music by: Madhavapeddi Suresh
- Production company: Bhargav Art Productions
- Release date: 28 July 1995
- Running time: 147 min
- Country: India
- Language: Telugu

Maatho Pettukoku (transl. Don't try to mess with us) is a 1995 Indian Telugu-language action film produced by S. Gopal Reddy under the Bhargav Art Productions banner and directed by A. Kodandarami Reddy. The film stars Nandamuri Balakrishna, Roja, Rambha, and music composed by Madhavapeddi Suresh.

== Plot ==
The film begins in the town where Sitamma, a benevolent daughter-in-law of a Zamindar, leads a delightful life with her husband and the two identical children, Arjun & Kishtaiah. Chakravarthy, a malice son-in-law of Zamindar, intrudes into their house, slays him & his son, and grabs their riches. Thus, Sitamma pledges not to disperse her husband's ashes until he seeks to avenge Chakravarthy when suddenly, Chakravarthy attacks, which detaches all. Years roll by, and a bold woman, Manikyam, rears Kishtaiah, who becomes a pickpocket. Once, he clashes with a naughty girl, Latha, the daughter of Chakravarthy's sidekick, Mayor Geedapenta Basavaiah, and crushes on her. Besides, Arjun turns into a stout-hearted cop and intentionally makes his posting to his hometown.

Whereat, Bhavani, the vicious son of Chakravarthy, conducts various trafficking & torts and tramples law & order. Upon arrival, Arjun acquaints with a handywoman, Lakshmi, and falls for her. In the interim, Latha returns home, and Kishtaiah shadows her; from there, a confusing drama arises, which ends hilariously. Parallelly, Sitamma resides at a temple in an insane state, carrying her husband's ashes and waiting for her children. Kishtaiah comes across her, and an unknown bondage relates to them. Meanwhile, Arjun destroys the Bhavani dynasty and seizes him. Being conscious of it, Chakravarthy lands to rescue his son and challenges Arjun. However, Arjun strikes back with his wit and blocks all the roads. So, Chakravarthy bribes a wicked cop, SI Venkata Rao, to free his son. Here, Arjun tactically gets Venkata Rao killed by Bhavani and encounters him. Infuriated, Chakravarthy roars at Arjun when he reveals his identity and vows to ruin him.

At that point, Chakravarthy gazes at the existence of two alike. Hence, he lures Kishtaiah to fulfill his longing to knit Latha and ruses to assassinate Basavaiah via him to incriminate Arjun. At a public function, when Kishtaiah is about to shoot, Mayor Sitamma fires on Chakravarthy, and Arjun apprehends her. Learning it, Kishtaiah bails her out in the guise of Arjun when Manikyam discerns and declares Kishtaiah as Sitamma's son. Meanwhile, Arjun detects Sitamma's bag, recognizes his mother, and all unite. At last, Arjun & Kishtaiah cease Chakravarthy and dissolve their father's ashes. Finally, the movie ends on a happy note with the marriage of Arjun to Lakshmi & Kishtaiah to Latha.

== Cast ==
- Nandamuri Balakrishna as (dual role)
  - SP Arjun; Seetamma's son;Kishtayya 's elder brother; Lakshmi's husband
  - Kishtayya;Seetamma's son; Arjun's younger brother; Latha's husband
- Roja as Latha; Kishtayya's wife
- Rambha as Lakshmi; Arjun's wife
- Captain Raju as Chakravarthy
- Raghuvaran as Bhavani
- Kota Srinivasa Rao as Mayor Geedapenta Basavayya
- Babu Mohan as Hanumanthu
- Giri Babu as Head Constable
- Rallapalli as Writer
- Ahuti Prasad as the father of the lead characters
- Ramalinga Raju as the grandfather of the lead characters
- Chinna as Inspector
- Vinod as S.I. Venkatrao
- Sakshi Ranga Rao as Rishawala
- Visweswara Rao as Kishtayya's henchman
- Gautam Raju as Kishtayya's henchman
- KK Sarma as Lawyer Pichaiah Chowdary
- Juttu Narasimham as Chilaka Jyothishikudu
- Dham
- Sujatha as Seetamma; Arjun and Kishtayya 's mother
- Varalakshmi as Shanti
- Disco Shanthi as item number
- Kalpana Rai as Hostel Warden
- Y. Vijaya as Manikyam
- Master Baladitya as Young Arjun

== Soundtrack ==
Maato Pettukoku

Film score by Madhavapeddi Suresh
- Released: 1995
- Genre: Soundtrack
- Length: 26:14
- Label: Supreme Music
- Producer: Madhavapeddi Suresh

Madhavapeddi Suresh chronology
Bhairava Dweepam (1994)	Maato Pettukoku (1995)	Sri Krishnarjuna Vijayam (1996)

Music composed by Madhavapeddi Suresh. Music released on Supreme Music Company.

No.	Title	Lyrics	Singer(s)	Length
1.	"Adhirindhi Adhirindhi"	Vennelakanti	S. P. Balasubrahmanyam, Renuka	4:20
2.	"Lachimee Lachimee"	Bhuvanachandra	S. P. Balasubrahmanyam, Chitra	4:26
3.	"Super Duper"	Vennelakanti	S. P. Balasubrahmanyam, Annupamaa	4:14
4.	"Maaghamasam"	Vennelakanti	Mano, Chitra	4:09
5.	"Mazare Gajjala"	Vennelakanti	Mano, Chitra	4:25
6.	"Ammante Elelo"	C. Narayana Reddy	Mano, P. Susheela, Renuka	4:23
Total length:				26:14
