= Nandi Awards of 2009 =

Indian Telugu film and TV awards ceremony

The Nandi Awards are presented annually in Andhra Pradesh, For Telugu cinema by State government. "Nandi" means "bull", the awards being named after the big granite bull at Lepakshi — a cultural and historical symbol of Andhra Pradesh. Nandi Awards are presented in four categories: Gold, Silver, Bronze, and Copper.

== 2009 Nandi Awards Winners List ==
Category	Winner	Film
Best Feature Film	Sontha Ooru	Sontha Ooru
Second Best Feature Film	Baanam	Baanam
Third Best Feature Film	Kalavaramaye Madilo	Kalavaramaye Madilo
Nandi Award for Akkineni Award for best home-viewing feature film	Konchem Ishtam Konchem Kashtam	Konchem Ishtam Konchem Kashtam
Best Popular Film for Providing Wholesome Entertainment	Magadheera	Magadheera
Sarojini Devi Award for a Film on National Integration	Jagadguru Sri Shiridi	Saibaba Jagadguru Sri Shiridi Saibaba
Best Children's Film	Nazarana	Nazarana
Second Best Children's Film	Bunty	Bunty
Best Documentary Film	Kartavyam	Kartavyam
Second Best Documentary Film	O Jogini Atmakatha	O Jogini Atmakatha
First best educational film	Vimukti	Vimukti
Second best educational film	R K Akna Goud	Bhavani
Best Actor	Dasari Narayana Rao	Mestri
Best Actress	Theertha	Sontha Ooru
Best Supporting Actor	Ramjagan	Mahatma
Best Supporting Actress	Ramya Krishna	Raju Maharaju
Best Character Actor	L.B. Sriram	Sontha Ooru
Best Villain	Taraka Ratna	Amaravathi
Best Male Comedian	Kishore Bokkala	Inkosari
Best Female Comedian	Hema	Konchem Ishtam Konchem Kashtam
Best Child Actor	Sai Krishna	Drona
Best Child Actress	Baby Gayatri	My Name is Amrutha
Best Director	S. S. Rajamouli	Magadheera
Best First Film of a Director	Suman Pathuri	Inkosari
Best Director for a Children's Film	Koti Babu	Nazarana
Best Screenplay Writer	Vikram Sirikonda-Deepak Raj	Konchem Ishtam Konchem Kashtam
Best Music Director	M. M. Keeravani	Vengamamba
Best Male Playback Singer	S. P. Balasubrahmanyam	Mahatma
Best Female Playback Singer	Chithra	Kalavaramaye Madilo
Best Lyricist	Suddala Ashok Teja	Mestri
Best Story Writer	Sekhar Kammula	Leader
Best Dialogue Writer	L.B. Sri Ram	Sontha Ooru
Best Cinematographer	Sudhakar Reddy	Amaravathi
Best Editor	Kotagiri Venkateswara Rao	Magadheera
Best Art Director	Ravinder	Magadheera
Best Choreographer	Siva Shankar	Magadheera
Best Male Dubbing Artist	P. Ravi Shankar	Anjaneyulu
Best Female Dubbing Artist	Soumya	Mahatma
Best Makeup Artist	Mallikharjuna Rao	Vengamamba
Best Fight Master	Ram-Lakshman	Ride
Best Costume Designer	Rama Rajamouli	Magadheera
Best Audiographer	Radhakrishna	Magadheera
Best Special Effects	Kamal Kannan, PC.Sanath, Ch Srinivas	Magadheera
Nandi Award for Best Book on Telugu Cinema(Books, posters, etc.)	Pulagam Chinnaraana (Aanati Aanavallu)	
Best Film Critic on Telugu Cinema	Hari Krishna Mamidi	
Special Jury Award	Genilia	Katha
Special Jury Award	Ram Charan Teja	Magadheera
Special Jury Award	Srikanth	Mahatma
Special Jury Award	Kumara Swamy	Raju Maharaju
Special Jury Award	Raghu Kunche	Bumper Offer
