= Matrudevobhava (TV series) =

- Genre: Drama; Family
- Created by: Padmini Nadella
- Written by: Gopi Venkat (dialogues)
- Screenplay by: Balabhadrapatruni Ramani
- Directed by: Mouli
- Starring: Pravaleeka; Raja Sridhar; Sainath; Srilakshmi; Nalini; Mounika; Ravikanth
- Theme music composer: Josya Bhatla
- Opening theme: "Mathrudevobhava"; Nakul Abhaykar (vocals) lyrics Ramajogayya Sastry; Bhuvanachandra
- Country of origin: India
- Original language: Telugu
- No. of seasons: 1
- No. of episodes: 553

Production
- Executive producer: Nandhana Nadella
- Producers: Yepuru Sreenath; Padmini Nadella
- Cinematography: Hanumantha Rao
- Editor: Ramaanjaneyareddy
- Camera setup: Multi-camera
- Running time: 20-22 minutes
- Production company: Sri Shirdi Sai Productions

Original release
- Network: Gemini TV
- Release: 30 October 2017 – 30 November 2019

Matrudevobhava (Telugu: మాతృదేవోభవ) was an Indian Telugu language soap opera starring Pravallika, Raja Sridhar, and Sainath as the main protagonists and Srilakshmi, Nalini, Mounika, and Ravikanth in pivotal roles. The serial aired on Gemini TV from 30 October 2017 to 30 November 2019 every Monday to Saturday at 12:30 PM IST for 553 episodes.

== Cast ==
- Pravallika as Krishnaveni
- Raja Sridhar as Arjun prasad, Krishnaveni's husband
- Sainath as Vijay
- Rishika as Meghana
- Srilakshmi as Gayatri devi, Arjun's mother
- C.H Krishnaveni as Vijay's grand mother
- Aditya as Venkat, Meghana's father
- Uma Shankar as Harish
- Sameera as Harish wife
- Divya Deepika as Karthik's sister in law

=== Former cast ===
- Ravi Kiran as Karthik
- Mounica as Kavya
- Nalini as Karthik's mother
- Bharani Shankar
- Lireesha

== Airing history ==
The serial started airing on Gemini TV on 30 October 2017. It aired on Monday to Friday 8:00PM IST. Later, a serial named Maya replaced this show at 8:00PM and pushed this serial to 2:30PM IST. Again it was shifted to 12:30PM from 30 September 2019. The serial ended on 30 November 2019 after airing 553 episodes.

== Awards and nominations ==
Year	Award	Category	Recipient	Role	Result
2019	TV9 Theevi Awards 2019	Best serial	Sri Shirdi Sai Productions	----	Won
2019	Swathi Art Creations Silver jubilee TV Awards 2019	Best Actress	Pravallika	Krishnaveni	Won
