= Madhavapeddi =

Madhavapeddi is a Telugu surname. Notable people with the surname include:

- Madhavapeddi Satyam (1922–2000), Telugu singer and stage actor
- Madhavapeddi Suresh (born 1951), Indian music composer
