= Anubandham =

Anubandham (lit. 'Relation') may refer to:

- Anubandham (1984 film), a Telugu film
- Anubandham (1985 film), a Malayalam film
