= Raaste Pyar Ke =

- Theatrical release poster
- Directed by: V. B. Rajendra Prasad
- Written by: Dr. Rahi Masoom Reza (dialogues)
- Screenplay by: Ram Kelkar
- Story by: V. B. Rajendra Prasad
- Based on: Dasara Bullodu (1971)
- Produced by: V. B. Rajendra Prasad
- Starring: Jeetendra; Rekha; Shabana Azmi
- Cinematography: P.S. Selvaraj
- Edited by: Akkkineni Sanjeevi
- Music by: Laxmikant–Pyarelal
- Production company: Jagapathi Art Productions
- Release date: 19 December 1982
- Running time: 126 minutes
- Country: India
- Language: Hindi

Raaste Pyar Ke (transl.The roads of love) is a 1982 Indian Hindi-language romance film, produced and directed by V. B. Rajendra Prasad under his Jagapathi Art Productions banner. The love triangle stars Jeetendra, Rekha and Shabana Azmi with music composed by Laxmikant–Pyarelal. The film is a remake of the Telugu blockbuster Dasara Bullodu (1971) with the same director.

== Plot ==
Mohanlal Srivatsav lives with his elder brother Sohanlal and sister-in-law Yashoda. Municipal Chairman Dwarka Prasad is their paternal uncle separated from them because of a family feud instigated by their aunt Saraswati. Mohanlal runs a mechanic shop opposite the house of rich man Udit Narayan Gupta who has repeatedly tried to get the shop closed. Gupta's daughter Shyama loves Mohanlal who is already in love with Shyama's best friend Gauri.

Shyama is diagnosed with cancer. Around the same time she discovers that Mohanlal and Gauri love each other. Udit Narayan conspires to get Shyama married to Mohanlal in the hope that she will survive. With help from Saraswati he separates Mohanlal from his brother as they have adopted him in childhood. He orders Gauri to leave Mohanlal and tells her about Shyama's condition. Gauri decides to marry Suldev who in turn adores her.

Shyama who had found out that Mohan and Gauri love each other becomes instrumental in uniting them before her death.

== Cast ==
- Jeetendra as Mohanlal Shrivatsav
- Rekha as Gauri
- Shabana Azmi as Shyama
- Shreeram Lagoo as Dwarka Prasad
- Utpal Dutt as Udit Narayan Gupta
- Parikshit Sahni as Sohanlal Shrivastav
- Om Puri as Suldev
- Yunus Parvez as Seetaram
- Mazhar Khan
- Nadira as Saraswati
- Ashalata Wabgaonkar as Laxmi
- Shaukat Kaifi
- Baby Khushbu as Anu

== Reception ==
Subhash K. Jha calls it "A typical South Indian masala-dosa film about two women sharing the same man".

== Soundtrack ==
Song	Singer	Raga
"Gokul Ki Galiyon Ka Gwala" (Trio)	Kishore Kumar, Asha Bhosle, Usha Mangeshkar	
"Sara Din Satate Ho"	Kishore Kumar, Asha Bhosle	
"Log Jal Gaye, Jane Kya Baat Hui Sathi, Chhati Pe Teer Chal Gaye"	Kishore Kumar, Anuradha Paudwal, Kavita Krishnamurthy	
"Main Tum Mein Sama Jaun"	S. P. Balasubrahmanyam, Lata Mangeshkar	Bairagi (raga)
"Raaste Pyar Ke"	Lata Mangeshkar	
"Gokul Ki Galiyon Ka Gwala" (Female)	Lata Mangeshkar, Asha Bhosle	
