= Uttar Purush =

Uttar Purush is a 1966 Bengali-language film directed by Chitrakar. The film was remade as Uyarndha Manithan (1968) in Tamil, and Anubandham (1984) in Telugu.

== Cast ==
- Vasant Choudhury
- Rabi Ghosh
- Anup Kumar
- Amar Mullick

== Soundtrack ==
All songs are composed by Manabendra Mukhopadhyay and written by Shyamal Gupta.

- "Ekbar Braje Cholo" - Madhuri Chatterjee
- "Moner Deule Chirodin" - Sandhya Mukhopadhyay
- "Ami Sei Pathe Jai" - Manabendra Mukhopadhyay
- "Moroger Ingreji Cock" - Pratima Bandopadhyay
