= Mamidi Harikrishna =

Director of culture department, Government of Telangana, India

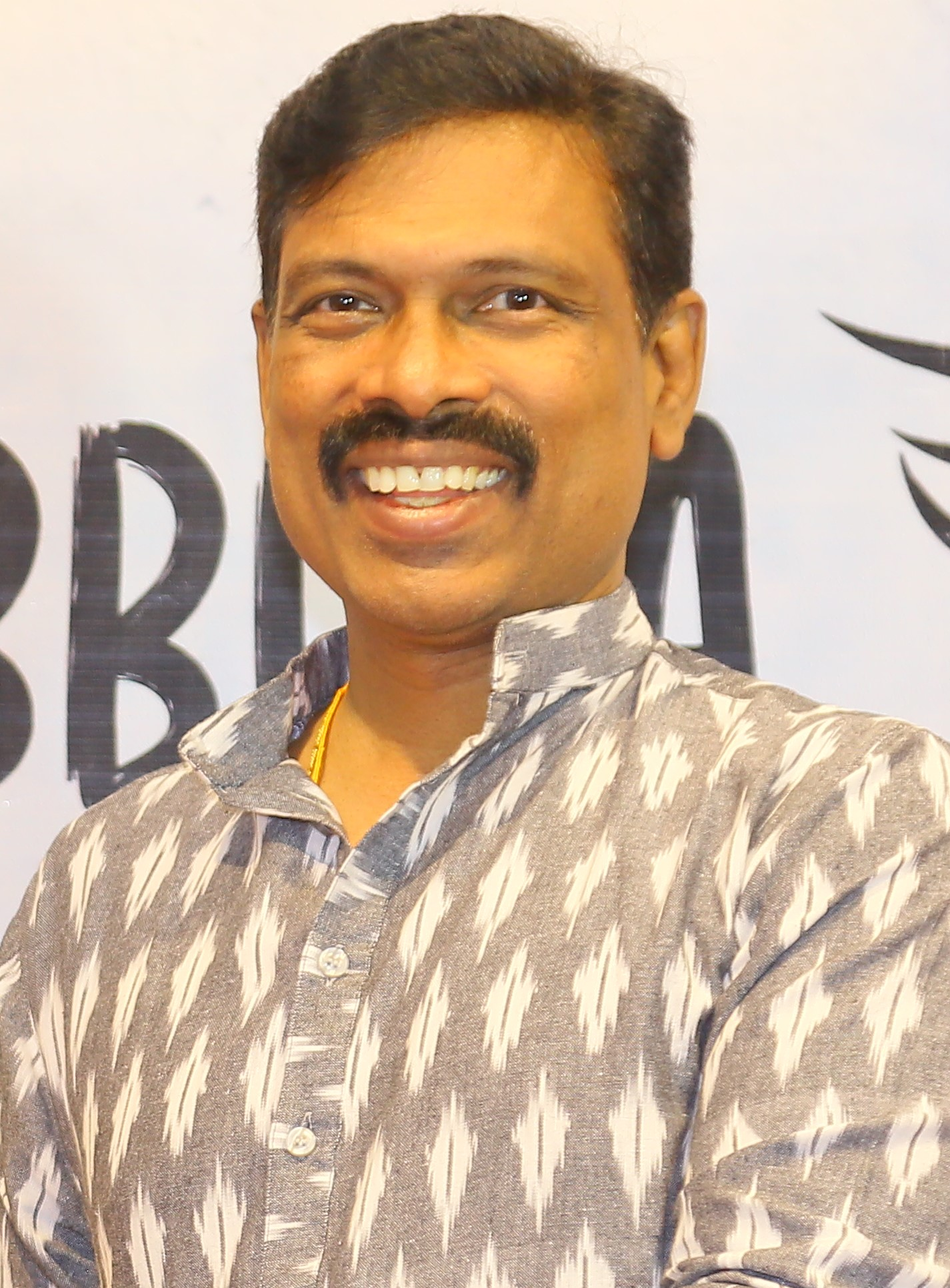
- Mamidi Harikrishna
- Born: Shayampet, Warangal District, Telangana, India
- Occupations: Director, culture department, government of telangana
- Years active: 1996–present
- Known for: poetry, film criticism

Mamidi Harikrishna is an Indian Telugu poet, illustrator, translator, documentary filmmaker, movie critic and Historian on Telangana state history and Films. He is currently the director of Language and Culture department of the Telangana government.

== Birth, early life ==
Harikrishna was born to Dr. Sudarshan and Smt. Swarajyam in Shayampet of Warangal district. He did his schooling up to class X in his village. His intermediate education and degree were completed from Lalbahadur College in Warangal and his post-graduation MA in psychology from Osmania University. He further completed his MEd from Kakatiya University. He did Ph.D. research on 'Folklore elements in Telugu Cinema a study', and received doctorate from Telugu University on 16 July 2022.

== Poetry ==
Harikrishna has published three of his own poetry compilations and as a director of the Culture Department, published 50 above books of various writers and poets. He is credited with introducing "Fusion Shayaree" into Telugu poetry in 2014.

=== as writer ===
1. Telugu Cinemallao Basha-Saahithyam-Samskruthi (Essays on Film Criticism and Analysis)
2. Ooriki Poyina Yalla (An anthology of selected 30 poems written in Telangana language between 1995 and 2018)
3. Sushupthi Nunchi (An anthology of poems written between 1986 and 1989)
4. Ontareekarana (An anthology of selected 45 poems written between 1993 and 2003)
5. Folklore elements in Telugu Cinema a study (Research Book)

=== as editor ===
1. Aashadeepam (Poetry on AIDS)
2. Chigurantha Aasha (First ever largest collection of stories on AIDS awareness)
3. Viniyogam - Vikasam Kosam (First ever collection of stories, poetry, cartoons on consumer rights awareness)

=== as editor (published by Dept. of Language and Culture, Government of Telangana) ===
The Department of Language and Culture have published the following books.

- Tolipoddu
- Kotta Salu
- Tangedu Vanam
- Matti Mudra
- Padya Telanganam
- Talli Veru
- Akupachani Poddu Podupu
- Smara Narayaneeyam
- Golla Ramavva and other plays
- Kala Telanganam
- Patam Kathalu
- Telangana Harvest
- Naya Saal
- Telangana Tejomurthulu
- Telangana Vaggeyakara Vaibhavam
- Telugu Cartoon
- A Green Garland
- Kakateeya Prasthanam
- Swedha Bhoomi
- Women in Art & Culture
- Manaku Teliyani Telangana
- Tharikullo Telangana
- Telangana Ruchulu
- Jaya Jayosthu Telangana
- Where the head is held high
- Adirang Mahotsav -2017
- Culture of Amity: Glimpses of Dargahs of Hyderabad
- Mimescape of Telangana
- A Montage On Mime
- Eyewitness Of An Epoch
- Culture of Telangana At Surajkund
- Alugu Dunkina Aksharam
- Telangana Bonalu
- Samkshema Swaralu
- Echoes of Lines
- Udyama Geetha

=== Public Service ===
Harikrishna joined the state civil services (of erstwhile Andhra Pradesh) in 1996. He was appointed to his current position, Director of Language and Culture, on 28 October 2014.

== Recognition ==
Harikrishna was awarded Best Film Critic in Telugu Cinema for the year 2009 and 2012. He is credited with organising the fifth edition of World Telugu Conference in Hyderabad in 2017. He was selected as the national poet from Telugu by Ministry of Information and Broadcasts, Government of India in 2019.
