= Kotha Pelli Koothuru =

- Theatrical release poster
- Directed by: K. S. Rami Reddy
- Written by: Thotapalli Madhu (dialogues)
- Screenplay by: K. S. Rami Reddy
- Story by: C. Kanakambara Raju
- Produced by: I. Seshu Babu
- Starring: Chandra Mohan; Vijayashanti; Rajendra Prasad
- Cinematography: B. A. Baig
- Edited by: M. S. Mani
- Music by: K. V. Mahadevan
- Production company: Jhansi Pictures
- Release date: 21 June 1985
- Running time: 126 mins
- Country: India
- Language: Telugu

Kotha Pelli Koothuru (transl. Newly married bride) is a 1985 Telugu-language drama film directed by K. S. Rami Reddy. It stars Chandra Mohan, Vijayashanti, Rajendra Prasad, and music composed by K. V. Mahadevan.

== Cast ==
- Chandra Mohan as Vijay
- Vijayashanti as Sujatha
- Rajendra Prasad as Raja
- Gollapudi Maruthi Rao as Veera Swamy
- Raavi Kondala Rao as Visweswara Rao
- Haranath as Dr. Pratap
- Kakarala as Simhachalam
- Potti Prasad as Dance Master
- Chitti Babu as Jimbo
- Annapurna as Janaki
- Rama Prabha as Parvathi
- Anuradha as item number
- Vanitha Sri as Swapna

== Soundtrack ==
Kotha Pelli Koothuru

Film score by K. V. Mahadevan
- Released: 1985
- Genre: Soundtrack
- Length: 19:25
- Label: EMI Columbia
- Producer: K. V. Mahadevan

K. V. Mahadevan chronology
Bullet (1985)	Kotha Pelli Koothuru (1985)	Muddula Chellelu (1985)

Music composed by K. V. Mahadevan. Music released on EMI Columbia Company.

S. No.	Song title	Lyrics	Singers	length
1	"Kommalo Kusindi O Koyila"	Veturi	S. P. Balasubrahmanyam, P. Susheela	4:02
2	"Padudhuna Jaavali"	Veturi	P. Susheela	3:50
3	"Kotta Neeru Pettukundi Godavari"	Veturi	S. P. Balasubrahmanyam, P. Susheela	4:45
4	"Panchuko Patte"	Veturi	Vani Jayaram	4:24
5	"Choodu Choodu Needalu"	Sri Sri	Anand	2:22

== Other ==
- VCDs and DVDs on - HYDERABAD Video Company, Hyderabad
