= V. B. Rajendra Prasad =

Indian filmmaker (1932–2015)

- Born: Veeramachaneni Rajendra Prasad; 4 November 1932; Gudivada, Madras Presidency, British India (present-day Andhra Pradesh, India)
- Died: 12 January 2015 (aged 82); Hyderabad, Telangana, India
- Occupations: Producer, director
- Children: 3, including Jagapathi Babu

Veeramachaneni Rajendra Prasad (4 November 1932 – 12 January 2015) was an Indian film producer, director, and screenwriter known for his works predominantly in Telugu cinema along with a few Hindi and Tamil films. He received a National Film Award for Antastulu (1965) and two Filmfare Awards for the films, Antastulu (1965) and Aastiparulu (1966). He is the father of noted actor Jagapathi Babu.

== Death ==
V. B. Rajendra Prasad died on 12 January 2015 at Isha Hospital following a serious respiratory ailment. Doctors informed that it was a natural death.

== Filmography ==
| Year | Title | Language | Producer | Director | Writer |
|---|---|---|---|---|---|
| 1960 | Annapurna | Telugu | Yes | No | No |
| 1962 | Aradhana | Telugu | Yes | No | No |
| 1964 | Aathma Balam | Telugu | Yes | No | No |
| 1965 | Antastulu | Telugu | Yes | No | No |
| 1966 | Aastiparulu | Telugu | Yes | No | No |
| 1969 | Adrushtavanthulu | Telugu | Yes | No | No |
| 1970 | Akka Chellelu | Telugu | Yes | No | No |
| 1971 | Dasara Bullodu | Telugu | Yes | Yes | Yes |
| 1973 | Bangaru Babu | Telugu | Yes | Yes | Yes |
| 1973 | Engal Thanga Raja | Tamil | Yes | Yes | No |
| 1974 | Andaru Dongale | Telugu | No | Yes | No |
| 1974 | Manchi Manushulu | Telugu | Yes | Yes | No |
| 1976 | Pichimaaraju | Telugu | No | Yes | Yes |
| 1976 | Uthaman | Tamil | Yes | Yes | No |
| 1977 | Bangaru Bommalu | Telugu | Yes | Yes | Yes |
| 1978 | Rama Krishnulu | Telugu | Yes | Yes | Yes |
| 1979 | Muddula Koduku | Telugu | Yes | Yes | No |
| 1979 | Pattakkathi Bhairavan | Tamil | Yes | Yes | No |
| 1982 | Raaste Pyar Ke | Hindi | Yes | Yes | Yes |
| 1983 | Bekaraar | Hindi | Yes | Yes | No |
| 1984 | S.P. Bhayankar | Telugu | Yes | Yes | No |
| 1985 | Bharyabhartala Bandham | Telugu | Yes | Yes | No |
| 1986 | Captain Nagarjun | Telugu | Yes | Yes | Yes |
| 1988 | Khatron Ke Khiladi | Hindi | Yes | No | No |
| 1989 | Simha Swapnam | Telugu | Yes | No | No |
| 1992 | Killer | Telugu | Yes | No | No |
| 1993 | Bangaru Bullodu | Telugu | Yes | No | No |
| 1995 | Bhale Bullodu | Telugu | Yes | No | No |
| 1998 | Pelli Peetalu | Telugu | Yes | No | No |

== Awards ==
National Film Awards

- Best Feature Film in Telugu - Antastulu (1965).

Filmfare Awards

- Best Film - Antastulu (1965)
- Best Film – Telugu - Aastiparulu (1966)

Nandi Awards

- Third Best Feature Film - Bronze - Aastiparulu (1966)
- Raghupathi Venkaiah Award (2003) - Lifetime achievement

Other honors

- K. V. Reddy memorial Award (2000)

== See also ==
- Raghupathi Venkaiah Award
