= Madam (film) =

- DVD cover
- Directed by: Singeetam Srinivasa Rao
- Written by: M. V. V. S. Babu Rao (dialogues)
- Screenplay by: Singeetam Srinivasa Rao
- Story by: Singeetam Srinivasa Rao
- Produced by: M. Chitti Babu; G. Gnaram Harish; Rajendra Prasad (present)
- Starring: Rajendra Prasad; Soundarya
- Cinematography: V. Suresh
- Edited by: Trinath
- Music by: Madhavapeddi Suresh
- Production company: Vijaya Chamundeswari Movies
- Release date: 19 October 1994
- Running time: 150 minutes
- Country: India
- Language: Telugu

Madam is a 1994 Indian Telugu-language comedy film written and directed by Singeetam Srinivasa Rao. It stars Rajendra Prasad, Soundarya with music composed by Madhavapeddi Suresh. Prasad plays the titular character of a man who disguises himself as a woman. The film was released on 19 October 1994, and won two Nandi Awards.

== Cast ==
- Rajendra Prasad as Prasad / Madam Sarojini / Mandakini
- Soundarya as Soundarya
- Subhalekha Sudhakar as Bobby
- Nagesh as Rayudu
- A.V.S. as a journalist
- Raavi Kondala Rao as Soundarya's father
- Sakshi Ranga Rao
- Vijaya Rangaraju as Major Chandrakanth
- Vinod as Yedakula Venkatrao
- Dr. Siva Prasad as Rayudu's P.A.
- Gundu Sudarshan as Sarojini's bodyguard
- Chitti Babu
- K.K.Sarma
- Kallu Chidambaram
- Sowcar Janaki as Sarada Devi
- Radha Kumari as Soundarya's mother
- Latha Sri as Kalpana
- Sailaja as Soundarya's sister
- Athili Lakshmi
- Kalpana Rai
- Chiranjeevi as himself
- Vijayashanti as herself

== Soundtrack ==
Music composed by Madhavapeddi Suresh.

No.	Title	Lyrics	Singer(s)	Length
1.	"Mahila Ika Niduranunchi"	Bhuvana Chandra	S.Janaki	3:40
2.	"Vache Vache Vaisakamlo"	Veturi	S. P. Balasubrahmanyam, Chitra	4:31
3.	"Navallakadu"	Bhuvana Chandra	S. P. Balasubrahmanyam, Mano	3:43
4.	"Singudama Singudama"	Bhuvana Chandra	S. P. Balasubrahmanyam, Renuka	4:28
5.	"My Dear Madam"	Jonnavittula	Rajendra Prasad, Chitra	4:45
Total length:				21:46

== Awards ==
Nandi Awards – 1994

- Best Home Viewing Feature Film – M. Chittibabu & Ramprasad
- Special Jury Award – Rajendra Prasad
