= Mounica =

South Indian film and television actress

- Occupation: Actress
- Years active: 2005–present
- Notable work: Radha Madhu

Mounica is an Indian actress who works predominantly in the Telugu film and television industries. Her big break was in MAA TV's show Radha Madhu one of the titular characters.

== Career ==
Mounica made her debut in Telugu cinema with Mahesh Babu starrer Athadu (2005). Mounica acted in films like Oka Oorilo and Stalin. She also acted in Chukkallo Chandrudu (2006) as the sister of Sadha which brought the opportunity of a lead role in Just Yellow Team's Radha Madhu, which aired on MAA TV (2006–08). She won hearts of many with her natural performance.

Mounica has received a lot of lead opportunities in television, including roles in Laya, Raktha Sambandham, Kunkuma Rekha, Arundhathi, Janaki Weds Raghuram, etc.

She also acted in the TV shows Abhishekam (ETV), Rama Seetha (Zee Telugu), and Ranivasam (Gemini TV).

== Filmography ==
- Note: all films are in Telugu, unless otherwise noted.

Year	Title	Role	Notes
2005	Oka Oorilo		
2005	Athadu	Poori’s cousin	
2006	Chukkallo Chandrudu	Shravani's sister	
2006	Stalin	Lakshmi	
2006	Annavaram	Yadav’s daughter	
2007	Vijayadasami	Aishwarya	
2009	Josh	Vidhya's sister-in-law	
2009	Vettaikaran	Shanthi	Tamil film
2015	Sher	Nandini’s sister	
2017	Ninnu Kori	Pallavi's elder sister	
2017	Lanka	Lady Officer	
2022	Sarkaru Vaari Paata	Rajendranath’s family member	
2024	Pushpa 2		
2026	The Raja Saab	Raju's family member	

== Television ==
- Note: all serials are in Telugu, unless otherwise noted.

Year	Serial	Role	Channel	Notes
2006-2008	Radha Madhu	Madhulika	MAA TV	Debut
2008-2010	Laya		MAA TV	
2008–2022	Abhishekam		ETV Telugu	
2009	Rakta Sambandham		Gemini TV	
2011	Kumkumarekha		E TV	
2011	Arundhati		Zee Telugu	
2008	Sriram Weds JanakiRaghuram		Zee Telugu	
2013	Auto Bharathi		Zee Telugu	
2015–2016	Rama Seetha		Zee Telugu	
2015–2016	Ranivasam		Gemini TV	
2016	Sri Venkateswara Vaibhavam		TTD	
2017	Matrudevobhava	Kavya	Gemini TV	
2017-2018	Ganga	Gangamma	Sun TV	Tamil serial
2022	Vantalakka		Star Maa	
2024	Kothaga Rekkalochena		Gemini TV	Cameo appearance
2025	Ammayigaru		Zee TV	
2025	Chaamanthi		Zee TV	
