= Hai Hai Nayaka =

1989 film by Jandhyala

- Directed by: Jandhyala
- Screenplay by: Jandhyala
- Story by: Adivishnu
- Produced by: Gunasekar M & Govardan N
- Starring: Naresh; Sri Bharati; Kota Srinivasa Rao; Suryakantam
- Edited by: Goutham Raju
- Music by: Suresh Chandra
- Production company: Lakshmi Krupa Productions
- Release date: 23 February 1989
- Country: India
- Language: Telugu

Hai Hai Nayaka is a 1989 Telugu-language comedy drama film, co-written and directed by Jandhyala, starring Naresh and Sri Bharati. Madhavapeddi Suresh composed the music for this film. The film released on 23 February 1989.

The film deals with the story of a school teacher transforming an abusive and ill-mannered student into a good student. A love track is interwoven in the main story.

== Plot ==
Ramakrishna (Naresh), grandson of Suryakantamma (Suryakantam) loses his job as a Telugu school teacher and is in search of a new job. However, his grandmother thinks that he is still working and keep boasting about it. He gets marriage proposals, but they withdraw after knowing that he is a Telugu teacher. He tries to make a living by doing odd jobs, but is asked to leave as he tries to teach correct Telugu to his customers also.

Suryakantamma is very affectionate towards his grandson. He faces a lot of difficulties with her pampering. During his college days, he falls in love with his classmate Radha Rani and she also accepts it. Once Suryakantamma comes to visit him and she feels sorry for his situation. She tries to arrange his job by linking it to his marriage. However, he rejects it because he wants to marry Radha Rani, whom he loved sincerely, though they had gotten separated because of some misunderstanding. He wants to get a job on his own.

In a school, Gopi, son of Pedda Rayudu (Kota Srinivasa Rao) behaves very rudely and uses very abusive language with his teachers. But the school teachers are afraid of controlling him because Rayudu also uses abusive language. Whenever Rayudu asks them how his son is studying, they try to cover it up by saying he is a good student. Once a D.E.O comes to inspect the school and asks some questions to the students. He gets an arrogant and abusive reply from Gopi. The DEO gets angry leaves the school immediately. Infuriated, Rayudu gives an ultimatum to the teachers that his son should be educated properly within 6 months, otherwise he would sack them.

As none of the existing school teachers dare to teach him, they look for another teacher who is unaware of the situation. At the same time, Suryakantamma arranges an interview for Ramakrishna in that school. They ask him easy questions, and also gives several allowances to stay in their village. Ramakrishna teaches discipline to all the students, but he is shocked by his abusive language and severely beats him. All the teachers are shocked by this behavior. They explain to him that the school is run by Pedda Rayudu and if he gets angry, all of them would lose their jobs. Ramakrishna is afraid of Rayudu and tries to flee from the village, but Rayudu's followers asks him to visit Rayudu once. He goes there and finds Radha Rani. Radha Rani still hates him because of some reason. Rayudu severely abuses him because he beat his son. After listening to his language, Ramakrishna openly opposes his behavior and explains to him that kids learn their manners by imitating their elders, and he is the reason for his son's behavior. Rayudu confesses his mistake and gives Ramakrishna full permission to change his son.

Ramakrishna chooses an innovative method to teach Gopi by playing along with him. Rayudu is now confident that he would definitely mend his son's behavior. Gopi slowly obliges Ramakrishna and learns good manners. The school teachers try to find the reason she hates Ramakrishna. She confesses that because of an unfortunate incident in her friend's life, she thinks that she will face the same fate. But after knowing about his sincerity, she agrees to marry him. After some funny incidents to tease Rayudu and his daughter by hiding Ramakrishna, Ramakrishna escapes from them with the help of Gopi and gets united with Radha Rani.

== Cast ==
- Naresh as Ramakrishna, a school teacher
- Sri Bharati as Radha Rani
- Kota Srinivasa Rao as Pedda Rayudu
- Suryakantam as Suryakantamma
- Master Vinnakota Kiran as Bulli Rayudu
- Brahmanandam as Patel master
- Suthivelu as Sarabhalingam master
- Potti Prasad as Avadhanulu master
- Srilakshmi as Oorvasi
- Subbaraya Sharma as Social studies teacher
- Mallikarjuna Rao as School worker
- Ashok Kumar
- Chitti Babu
- Gundu Hanumantha Rao
- Sandhya
- Rambabu

== Sound track ==
Song title	Singer(s)	Lyrics
Guruvante Gundrayi Kaadu	S. P. Balasubrahmanyam	Mullapudi Sastry
Achulu Padaharu	S. P. Balasubrahmanyam, S. Janaki	Mullapudi Sastry
Idi Saragamlerugani Raagamu	S. P. Balasubrahmanyam, S. Janaki	Jonnavithula
Muddoche Papa	S. P. Balasubrahmanyam, Sreelekha	Jonnavithula
Nadumu natyamadithe	S. P. Balasubrahmanyam, Chitra & JOJO	Mullapudi Sastry

== Awards ==
- Nandi Award for Best Editor - Gowtham Raju (1988)
