= Dasara Bullodu =

- Theatrical release poster
- Directed by: V. B. Rajendra Prasad
- Written by: Story & Screenplay: V. B. Rajendra Prasad; Dialogues: Acharya Aatreya
- Produced by: V. B. Rajendra Prasad
- Starring: Akkineni Nageswara Rao; Vanisri; Chandrakala
- Cinematography: S. Venkataratnam
- Edited by: Akkineni Sanjeev Rao
- Music by: K. V. Mahadevan
- Production company: Jagapathi Art Pictures
- Release date: 13 January 1971
- Running time: 160 minutes
- Country: India
- Language: Telugu

Dasara Bullodu (transl. Dasara lad) is a 1971 Indian Telugu-language drama film written, directed and produced by V. B. Rajendra Prasad. The film stars Akkineni Nageswara Rao, Vanisri, and Chandrakala, with music composed by K. V. Mahadevan. This film marked Rajendra Prasad's directorial debut.

Dasara Bullodu was a major success, becoming an Industry Hit in Telugu cinema. It is considered one of Akkineni Nageswara Rao's biggest hits. The film ran for 100 days in 25 theatres and achieved a 200-day run in four centers, making it the first non-mythological Telugu film to achieve such a milestone. It was also the first film to celebrate a 200-day run in all three regions of the then undivided Andhra Pradesh. The film was later remade in Hindi as Raaste Pyar Ke (1982) by the same banner and director.

== Plot ==
The film opens in a village where Gopi, a cheerful and carefree young man, is raised by his elder brother Vasu and sister-in-law Yasodha. Their paternal uncle, President Bhushayya, is a man of integrity who was estranged from his elder brother due to the manipulations of his wife, Bullemma.

Bullemma's brother, Bullayya, seeks to exploit Gopi for his wealth by arranging a marriage between Gopi and his daughter, Nirmala. Despite Nirmala's affection for Gopi, he is in love with Radha, Yasodha's sister and Nirmala’s close friend. Nirmala, who is suffering from cancer, discovers Gopi and Radha’s relationship and decides to sacrifice her own love for their happiness.

Bullayya, aware of Nirmala's illness and her love for Gopi, insists on hastening the marriage to Gopi, hoping that her deep affection might lead to a miraculous recovery. Simultaneously, he plots to separate Gopi and Radha, creating conflict between Gopi and Vasu and threatening Radha to keep her away from Gopi. Radha, understanding Nirmala's condition, reluctantly agrees to the plan and convinces Gopi to marry Nirmala.

As the wedding preparations proceed, Vasu arranges for Radha to be married to Gopi's close friend, Bodi Babu. On the wedding day, Bodi Babu attempts to reunite Gopi and Radha, but Bullayya disrupts the ceremony by setting fire to the venue. Gopi successfully rescues everyone, and, despite the chaos, Nirmala dies peacefully, content in knowing that Gopi and Radha are finally united.

== Cast ==
- Akkineni Nageswara Rao as Gopi
- Vanisri as Radha
- Chandrakala as Nirmala
- S. V. Ranga Rao as Bhushayya
- Gummadi as Vasu
- Nagabhushanam as Bullayya
- Padmanabham as Bodi Babu
- Raavi Kondala Rao as priest
- Anjali Devi as Yashoda
- Suryakantham as Bullamma
- Chaya Devi as Aademma
- Radha Kumari as Nirmala's mother
- Jhansi as Kantamma
- Baby Rani as Chitti
- Pisupati Venkateswara Rao as doctor

== Production ==
The film marked the directorial debut of V. B. Rajendra Prasad. Prasad initially wanted V. Madhusudhana Rao and later Adurthi Subba Rao to direct the film but due to busy schedules they could not direct it instead Prasad himself directed the film after Nageswara Rao encouraged him to do so. Jayalalitha was originally chosen as lead actress but due to her prior commitments in Tamil, Vanisri became the lead actress. The film's first schedule began with the song "Pachagadi Koseti" at Bhatlapenumarru of Krishna district and that schedule was completed within twelve days while the second schedule was shot at Amalapuram.

== Soundtrack ==
Dasara Bullodu

Film score by K. V. Mahadevan
- Released: 1971
- Genre: Soundtrack
- Length: 27:31
- Label: Saregama Audio
- Producer: K. V. Mahadevan

K. V. Mahadevan chronology
Iddaru Ammayilu (1971)	Dasara Bullodu (1971)	Prem Nagar (1971)

The film's music was composed by K. V. Mahadevan. The lyrics were written by Acharya Aatreya. Music was released on Saregama Audio Company. The song "Ettago Unnadi" was remixed for the film Nenunnanu (2004), and the song "Pachagaddi Koseti" was remixed for Mallanna (2009).

S. No	Song title	Singers	length
1	"Pachagaddi Koseti"	Ghantasala, P. Susheela	3:53
2	"Ettaago Vunadi"	Ghantasala, P. Susheela	4:09
3	"Nallavaade"	Ghantasala, P. Susheela	3:58
4	"Chethilo Cheyyesi"	Ghantasala, P. Susheela	3:36
5	"Nallavaade" (Pathos)	S. Janaki, P. Susheela	3:56
6	"Chethilo Cheyyesi" (Pathos)	P. Susheela	3:36
7	"Oh Mallayyagari"	Ghantasala, Pithapuram	4:23

== Release ==
The film completed 100 days in 25 centers and had a 365-day run in Pratap theater at Tirupathi. The film celebrated its 100-day run in Vijayawada, Gudivada, and Vizag, and the 250-day run in Madras (now Chennai).
