= Anubandham (1984 film) =

- Theatrical release poster
- Directed by: A. Kodandarami Reddy
- Written by: Satyanand (dialogues)
- Screenplay by: A. Kodandarami Reddy
- Based on: Uttar Purush (1966)
- Produced by: N. R. Anuradha Devi
- Starring: Akkineni Nageswara Rao; Radhika; Sujatha; Karthik
- Cinematography: S. Navakanth
- Edited by: Kotagiri Venkateswara Rao
- Music by: Chakravarthy
- Production company: Lakshmi Films Combines
- Release date: 31 March 1984
- Running time: 137 minutes
- Country: India
- Language: Telugu

Anubandham (transl. Relation) is a 1984 Telugu-language drama film directed by A. Kodandarami Reddy. The film stars Akkineni Nageswara Rao, Radhika and Sujatha, with music composed by Chakravarthy. It is a remake of the Bengali film Uttar Purush (1966) which was previously remade in Tamil as Uyarndha Manithan (1968).

== Cast ==
- Akkineni Nageswara Rao as Rajesh
- Radhika as Malli
- Sujatha as Sujatha
- Jaggayya as Dr. Gopal
- Karthik as Satya Murthy
- Prabhakar Reddy as Ranganna
- Allu Ramalingaiah as Shankaraiah
- Nagesh as Tata Rao
- Raavi Kondala Rao as Ramanaiah
- Chalapati Rao as Rowdy
- Bhimeswara Rao as Raghupati Rao
- Hema Sundar as Pedda Dora
- Tulasi as Gowri
- Radha Kumari as Ramanaiah's wife
- Girija as Girija
- Mamatha as Aliveelu
- Jaya Vijaya as Vijaya
- Nirmalamma as Nirmala

== Soundtrack ==
Music was composed by Chakravarthy.

Song title	Lyrics	Singers	length
"Jim Jim Tarare"	Veturi	S. P. Balasubrahmanyam, P. Susheela	4:39
"Mallepulu Gollumannavi"	Veturi	S. P. Balasubrahmanyam, S. Janaki	4:17
"Aanati Aa Sneha"	Acharya Aatreya	S. P. Balasubrahmanyam	4:04
"Pratireyi Ravala"	Rajasri	S. P. Balasubrahmanyam, P. Susheela	4:41
"Oka Budhavaram"	Veturi	Madhavapeddi Ramesh, P. Susheela	4:30
