= Chitti Babu (Telugu actor) =

Indian actor and comedian

- Born: Punyamurthula Suryanarayana Murthy; Amalapuram, Andhra Pradesh
- Occupations: Actor; comedian
- Years active: 1973–2013

Punyamurthula Suryanarayana Murthy, also known by his stage name Chitti Babu, is an Indian actor and comedian, known for his works predominantly in Telugu cinema. He is the brother of noted comedians Raja Babu and Ananth Babu.

== Personal life ==
Chitti Babu was born in Amalapuram Andhra Pradesh, to Punyamurthula Umamaheswara Rao and Ramanamma as Suryanarayana Murthy. His elder brother is well-known Telugu comedian Raja Babu and his younger brother, Ananth Babu, is also a Tollywood comedian. He has campaigned for the Indian National Congress by staging plays in Nalgonda in 2009.

== Filmography ==
=== Telugu films ===
List of films and roles
Year	Title	Role	Notes
1973	Palleturi Bava	Rickshawala	
1975	Annadammula Anubandham		
1975	Aadavalu Apanindhalu		
1976	Monagadu	Chittigadu	
1976	Alludochadu	Garudachalam's servant	
1977	Bangaru Bommalu		
1977	Chanakya Chandragupta	Nandulu	
1980	Bhola Shankarudu		
1982	Anuraga Devatha	Mallayya's assistant	
1982	Prathikaram	Govind	
1983	Sree Ranga Neethulu	Daivaaeenam	
1983	Bezawada Bebbuli		
1983	Adavallu Aligithe	Damodaram	
1983	Pichi Pantulu		
1983	Pelli Choopulu		
1984	Kanchu Kagada		
1984	Aparadhi		
1984	Devanthakudu		
1984	Rustum		
1985	Jwala		
1985	Vintha Mogudu		
1985	Kotha Pelli Koothuru		
1985	Vande Mataram		
1985	Maa Inti Mahalakshmi	Chinthakayala Chittibabu	
1985	Puli		
1985	Donga		
1985	Pratighatana		
1985	Pattabhishekam		
1985	Paripoyina Khaideelu		
1985	Babai Abbai		
1986	Kaliyuga Pandavulu		
1986	Kondaveeti Raja		
1986	Anasuyamma Gari Alludu		
1986	Ugra Narasimham		
1986	Chanakya Sapatham	Kaky	
1987	Idha Prapancham		
1987	Muddayi	Thadivelu	
1987	Hanthakudi Veta		
1987	Daada		
1987	Ajeyudu		
1987	Alludu Kosam	Anji	
1987	Krishna Leela		
1988	Abhinandana		
1988	Bandipotu	Pickpocket	
1988	Yuddha Bhoomi		
1988	Sagatu Manishi		
1988	Raktabhishekam		
1988	Aanimuthyam		
1988	Donga Pelli		
1988	Station Master		
1988	Donga Kollu	Constable	
1988	Tiragabadda Telugubidda		
1989	Hai Hai Nayaka	Sanskrit Teacher turned Rickshaw Puller	
1989	Bandhuvulostunnaru Jagartha		
1989	Bala Gopaludu		
1989	Chennapatnam Chinnollu	Gafoor Khan	
1989	Preminchi Chudu		
1989	Ayyappa Swamy Mahatyam		
1989	Pape Maa Pranam		
1989	Ontari Poratam		
1990	Kodama Simham	Thelu	
1990	Jayasimha	Chitti	
1990	Alludugaru		
1990	Maa Inti Katha		
1990	Nari Nari Naduma Murari		
1990	Chevilo Puvvu		
1991	Parishkaram		
1991	Bhargav		
1991	Chitram Bhalare Vichitram	Swapna's servant	
1991	Kalikalam		
1991	Siva Sakthi		
1992	Agreement		
1992	Valu Jada Tolu Beltu		
1992	Jagannatham & Sons		
1992	Srimaan Brahmachari		
1992	President Gari Pellam		
1992	Killer		
1992	Repati Koduku		
1993	Allari Priyudu		
1993	Pelli Gola		
1993	Adivaram Amavasya		
1993	Nippu Ravva		
1993	Allari Alludu		
1993	Shh Ghup Chup		
1993	Asale Pellaina Vaani		
1994	Bhairava Dweepam		
1994	Yamaleela		
1994	Bobbili Simham		
1994	Nannagaru		
1994	Palletoori Mogudu		
1994	Kurradhi Kurradu	Chitti Babu	
1994	Madam		
1995	Leader		
1995	Pokiri Raja		
1995	Vaddu Bava Thappu		
1995	Alibaba Adbhuta Deepam	Gandharva	
1995	Sisindri		
1995	Love Game		
1995	Ketu Duplicate		
1995	Ghatothkachudu		
1996	Bombay Priyudu		
1996	Pelli Sandadi		
1996	Mummy Mee Aayanochadu		
1997	Pattukondi Chuddam		
1997	Super Heroes		
1997	Egire Paavurama		
1997	Priyamaina Srivaru		
1997	Kaliyugamlo Gandargolam		
1997	Priyaragalu		
1998	Kante Kuthurne Kanu		
1998	Pape Naa Pranam		
1998	Daddy Daddy		
1998	Pavitra Prema		
1998	Aahaa..!		
1998	Pelli Peetalu		
1998	Ulta Palta		
1999	English Pellam East Godavari Mogudu		
1999	Bala Veerulu		
1999	Iddaru Mithrulu	Jacky	
2000	Azaad		
2000	Vijayaramaraju		
2000	Uncle		
2001	Evadra Rowdy		
2001	Raa		
2002	Vachina Vaadu Suryudu		
2002	Nuvve Nuvve		
2002	Vasu		
2002	Okato Number Kurraadu		
2003	Gangotri		
2003	Palanati Brahmanaidu		
2003	Maa Alludu Very Good		
2004	Malliswari		
2004	Enjoy		
2004	Jai	Priest	
2004	Nenunnanu		
2004	Shiva Shankar		
2004	Aaptudu		
2005	Andhrudu		
2005	Hungama		
2005	Radha Gopalam		
2006	Hanumanthu		
2006	Sri Ramadasu		
2006	Evandoi Srivaru	Music troupe member	
2007	Itlu Nee Vennela		
2008	Aatadista		
2008	Pandu Rangudu		
2008	Veedu Mamoolodu Kadu	Swathi's grandfather	
2009	Koothuru Kosam		
2009	Circus Circus		
2009	Jagadguru Sri Shirdi Sai Baba		
2010	Buridi		
2010	Subapradam		
2012	Prema Pilustondi		
2012	Bongaram		
2012	Sevakudu		
2012	Plan		
2012	Manasa Thulli Padake		
2013	Julayi		

=== Hindi films ===
List of Hindi films and roles
Year	Title	Role	Notes
1984	Aaj Ka M.L.A. Ram Avtar		
1984	John Jani Janardhan		
1995	Taqdeerwala		

== Television ==
- Janaki Kalaganaledu as Kanna Rao
- "Paan Parakasta" episodes of Amrutham
