= Yamadonga =

2007 Indian film by SS Rajamouli

- Theatrical Movie Poster
- Directed by: S. S. Rajamouli
- Screenplay by: S. S. Rajamouli
- Dialogues by: M. Rathnam
- Story by: V. Vijayendra Prasad
- Produced by: Chiranjeevi Pedamallu; Urmila Gunnam
- Starring: N. T. Rama Rao Jr. Mohan Babu; Priyamani; Mamta Mohandas
- Cinematography: K. K. Senthil Kumar
- Edited by: Kotagiri Venkateswara Rao
- Music by: M. M. Keeravani
- Production company: Visvamitra Creations
- Distributed by: Visvamitra Creations
- Release date: 15 August 2007
- Running time: 179 minutes
- Country: India
- Language: Telugu
- Budget: ₹16–18 crore
- Box office: ₹28 crore distributors' share

Yamadonga (transl. The grand thief or The thief of Yama) is a 2007 Indian Telugu-language fantasy action comedy film directed by S. S. Rajamouli, who co-wrote the film with V. Vijayendra Prasad. It was produced by Chiranjeevi Pedamallu and Gangaraju Gunnam under Visvamitra Creations. It stars N. T. Rama Rao Jr., Mohan Babu, Priyamani, and Mamta Mohandas.

Inspired by the 1977 film Yamagola, the plot follows Raja, a thief who is killed by his rivals. Raja's soul travels to Naraka (hell) to face the trail for his sins by Yama, the Hindu god of death and justice. The film began its production in January 2007 and was made on a budget of ₹16 crore (US$1.7 million)–₹18 crore (US$1.9 million). (Note: The average exchange rate in 2007 was 41.35 Indian rupees (₹) per 1 US dollar (US$).) Filming primarily took place in Hyderabad and Ramoji Film City. The film has music composed by M. M. Keeravani and cinematography by K. K. Senthil Kumar.

Yamadonga was released worldwide on 15 August 2007. Upon its release, it received positive reviews from both critics and audiences, becoming a major success at the box office. The film collected a distributor's share of ₹28 crore (US$2.9 million) and a box office gross of over ₹49 crore (US$5.1 million), emerging as a blockbuster as well as becoming the highest-grossing Telugu film of 2007. It won four Nandi Awards while Rama Rao Jr., went on to win the Filmfare Award for Best Actor – Telugu.

== Plot ==
Raja is a street-smart thief operating in Hyderabad alongside his partner-in-crime, Sathi, while harboring a massive financial debt to a violent moneylender named Dhanalakshmi. During his childhood, Raja briefly met Mahi, a wealthy orphan girl who gifted him a distinct, sacred locket. Finding no market value for the artifact, Raja repeatedly attempts to discard it, but it miraculously returns to his possession each time. Twelve years later, following the demise of her grandfather, Mahi is subjected to severe domestic servitude and psychological abuse by her greedy relatives, who intend to usurp her multi-million rupee inheritance. Realizing that Mahi's direct murder would legally transfer her wealth to a public charity, her uncles stage a fraudulent abduction, intending to surrender her estate under the guise of paying a ransom. Raja inadvertently rescues Mahi from the staged kidnapping and shelters her. Upon discovering her immense wealth, he negotiates a massive ransom payout with her uncles. Unaware of his mercenary motives, Mahi falls deeply in love with him. Unwilling to pay Raja, the uncles contract a local gangster named Narayana to assassinate him.

Following his murder, Raja's soul is transported to Yamalokam (the underworld). There, he discovers that although he was destined for a long mortality, Yama Dharmaraja, the King of Hell, orchestrated his premature death as retaliation for an insult Raja uttered while intoxicated on Earth. Seeking retribution, Raja learns that possessing the Yama Pasam (the celestial lasso of death) grants absolute authority over the underworld. He surreptitiously steals the lasso from Yama during the deity's private leisure trip with his consort. Raja then instigates the denizens of Hell to revolt against the underworld's strict penal codes. When Yama challenges his insubordination, the divine sage Narada proposes a democratic election for the throne of Yamaloka. During the subsequent campaign, Raja outmaneuvers Yama and publicly frames him for lecherous behavior, causing Yama's consort to abandon him. Raja wins the election, but Yama manages to reclaim the Yama Pasam. However, Raja reveals he has already rewritten his own destiny using celestial records to grant himself a long life, subsequently returning to his physical body on Earth.

Awakening in the mortal realm, a reformed Raja witnesses Mahi's severe exploitation and resolves to protect her. He violently overpowers her relatives, takes control of the household, and proposes marriage to Mahi, genuinely reciprocating her love. When an arrogant Raja insults Yama once again, the deity descends to Earth alongside his scribe, Chitragupta, seeking vengeance. Yama assumes the guise of the moneylender Dhanalakshmi, while Chitragupta poses as her father, and they embed themselves in Mahi's mansion. Yama soon realizes that Mahi's pure, spiritual love creates a protective barrier that prevents him from taking Raja's life. To circumvent this, Yama orchestrates a series of misunderstandings that successfully alienates the couple.

With Raja isolated, Mahi's uncles once again enlist Narayana to eliminate him. However, Narayana betrays the uncles, abducts Mahi out of lust, and severely wounds a intervening Raja. A bleeding Raja tracks them to the Lord Narasimha temple in Simhachalam. Yama dispatches the Yama Pasam to execute Raja, but the weapon halts because taking a mortal life inside the holy temple precincts is divinely forbidden. Remaining in the guise of Dhanalakshmi, Yama attempts to lure Raja outside the gates. Raja reveals that he has known Dhanalakshmi's true divine identity all along; he sincerely apologizes for his past arrogance and begs for a temporary reprieve to save Mahi, promising to surrender his soul willingly afterward. Moved by Raja's honor, Yama relents but admits to Narada that once unleashed, the Yama Pasam cannot be recalled and will inevitably claim Raja's life.

Despite his critical injuries, Raja overpowers Narayana and successfully rescues Mahi, collapsing on the verge of death. At that moment, the childhood locket—revealed to be a divine blessing from Lord Narasimha—intervenes, absorbing the lethal energy of the Yama Pasam and permanently restoring Raja's health and lifespan. Meanwhile, Chitragupta convinces Yama's estranged wife to descend to Earth to reconcile with her husband. However, as the human Dhanalakshmi pursues Raja for his unpaid debts, Raja eludes her by tying her saree to Yama's Yama Pasam. Arriving at that exact moment, Yama's wife misinterprets the scene as another act of infidelity and abandons Yama once more. Having permanently secured Mahi's safety and estate, Raja happily begins his new life with her.

== Cast ==
- Jr. N.T.R. in a dual role as
  - Raja
    - Sri Simha as young Raja
  - Young Yama Dharma Raja
- Mohan Babu as Yama Dharma Raja
- Priyamani as Maheswari "Mahi"
  - Vishnu Priya Bhimeneni as young Maheswari "Mahi"
- Mamta Mohandas in a dual role as
  - Dhanalakshmi, a moneylender
  - Maya Dhanalakshmi, earthly avatar of Yama Dharma Raja
- Narendra Jha as Narayana
- Ali as Sathi
- Brahmanandam as Chitragupta
- Khushbu as Yama's wife
- Jaya Prakash Reddy as Ram Prasad, Maheswari's elder uncle
- Siva Parvathi as Maheswari's aunt
- Raghubabu as Maheswari's younger uncle
- Ranganath as Maheswari's grandfather
- Rajiv Kanakala as Indra
- Naresh as Narada
- Narsing Yadav as Guard in Yama's Palace
- Bharani as Varuna Deva
- MS Narayana as Raja's partner in Yamalokam and former client of Raja when he was alive
- Stunt Silva as a goon
- Rambha (special appearance in the song "Nachore")
- Navneet Kaur as Rambha (special appearance in the song "Young Yama")
- Preeti Jhangiani as Urvasi (special appearance in the song "Young Yama")
- Archana Veda as Menaka (special appearance in the song "Young Yama")
- Sr. N.T.R. is featured in the cameo appearance as himself using archived footage.

== Production ==
Yamadonga is the third collaboration between S. S. Rajamouli and N. T. Rama Rao Jr. after Student No: 1 (2001) and Simhadri (2003). In an interview with Telugucinema.com, Rajamouli revealed that the basic plot — where the hero dies and goes to Yamalokam and comes back to Earth — is inspired by the films Devanthakudu (1960) and Yamagola (1977) which starred Jr NTR's grandfather Sr. N.T.R. Rajamouli mentioned that apart from the basic plot, Yamadonga has no similarities with earlier films.

The film also features a scene with Jr NTR alongside his grandfather as an acknowledgement of Yamagola. Rajamouli worked along with his father V. Vijayendra Prasad to develop the script. Rajamouli chose veteran actor Mohan Babu to play the role of Yama as he felt Mohan Babu was the "perfect and only choice" for the role. Following the suggestion of Rajamouli, Jr NTR underwent extensive weight loss especially for the film. Actress Priyamani is cast opposite Jr NTR. She slipped while walking on the stones and got her ankle sprained with a minor bleeding injury during shooting.

Principal photography of the film began in January 2007. Scenes related to Naraka (or Yama Loka) were shot at a specially erected set at Ramoji Film City. A few sequences were filmed at Talakona forest in Andhra Pradesh. A song was shot at Golconda Fort in Hyderabad, for which a waterfall was created at the location.

== Release ==
The film was initially planned to release on 9 July 2007, but was ultimately released on 15 August 2007. The Tamil version of the film was released on 29 November 2019 under the title Vijayan. ARK Rajaraja wrote the dialogues for the Tamil version. The film was also dubbed into Hindi language as Lok Parlok, and in Odia as Yamraja.

=== Home media ===
The DVD version of the film was released on 29 February 2008. This DVD release was distributed by Tolly2Holly all around the world, except for India. It is available in 16:9 anamorphic widescreen, Dolby Digital 5.1 Surround, progressive 24 FPS, widescreen and NTSC format. The film had a Blu-ray release in Japan on 3 April 2024.

== Reception ==
=== Critical response ===
Oneindia.in described as "The film is a visual treat for all ages and classes. Rajamouli has done an excellent job molding NTR Jr's character in the film much like his grandfather's and also for bringing NTR back on the screen in an animated form. NTR Jr's overall performance and his dialogue delivery are a joy to watch. Mohanbabu playing 'Yama' once again proved to be the versatile actor that he is".

Sify gave an "average" verdict explained "This socio-fantasy film works, thanks to the new look of NTR and enigmatic performance of Mohan Babu. The songs and background score of MM Keeravani, the technical aspects and entertainer quotient in the first half make the film watchable". Jeevi of Idlebrain.com gave 3/5 stars said "First half of the film is entertaining. The second half should have been better. The plus points of the film are Mohan Babu, NTR, sets, cinematography and music. On the flip side, the screenplay of the film is not gripping in second half (after NTR returns to earth). The runtime of the film is pretty lengthy (3.05 hours)".

=== Box office ===
Yamadoga was a huge commercial success, earning a distributor share of over ₹29 crores. It ran for 50-days in 405 centers and completed a 100-day run in 32 centres, becoming the highest-grossing Telugu film of 2007. It gave NTR Jr. a massive success after his previous blockbuster, Simhadri (2003), with S. S. Rajamouli.

== Music ==
The music was composed by M. M. Keeravani and released by Vel Records.

Yamadonga

Soundtrack album by M. M. Keeravani
- Released: 14 July 2007
- Recorded: 2007
- Genre: Soundtrack
- Length: 32:41
- Label: Vel Records
- Producer: M. M. Keeravani

M. M. Keeravani chronology
Chandrahas (2007)	Yamadonga (2007)	Dhokha (2007)

Track list
No.	Title	Lyrics	Singer(s)	Length
1.	"Rabbaru Gajulu"	Ananta Sriram	Daler Mehndi, Pranavi Acharya	5:19
2.	"Nuvvu Muttukunte"	Ananta Sriram	Ranjith, Pranavi Acharya	3:53
3.	"Olammi Tikkareginda"	Bhuvana Chandra	N. T. Rama Rao Jr, Mamta Mohandas	4:11
4.	"Nachore Nachore"	Bhuvana Chandra	Deepu, Ganga	4:54
5.	"Nunugu Misalodu"	Ananta Sriram	M. M. Keeravani, Sunitha Upadrashta	5:03
6.	"Young Yama"	Ananta Sriram	M. M. Keeravani, Shankar Mahadevan, Mano, Pranavi Acharya	4:54
7.	"Srikara Karunda"	Jonnavitthula	Mano	1:29
8.	"Chala Challaga Gali"	Bhuvana Chandra	M. M. Keeravani, Sangeethaa-Sangeetha Sajith.	1:57
9.	"Bambharala Chumbhanala"	Bhuvana Chandra	Mano, Pranavi Acharya	1:01
Total length:				32:41

== Awards ==
Nandi Awards 2008.

- Best Editor – Kotagiri Venkateswara Rao
- Best Makeup Artist – Nalla Seenu
- Best Costume Designer – Rama Rajamouli
- Nandi Award for Best Special Effects – Kamal Kannan

Filmfare Awards 2008

- Filmfare Best Actor Award (Telugu) – N. T. Rama Rao Jr.

CineMAA Awards 2008

- Best Actor – N. T. Rama Rao Jr.
