= Raavi Kondala Rao =

Indian actor, writer, and journalist (1932–2020)

- రావి కొండలరావు
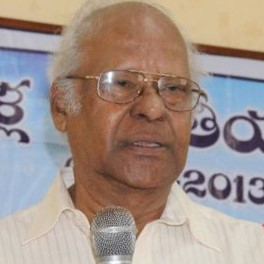
- Film and theatre artist
- Born: Raavi Kondala Rao; 11 February 1932; Andhra Pradesh
- Died: 28 July 2020 (aged 88); Hyderabad, Telangana
- Other name: Sukumar (pen-name)
- Occupations: Actor, playwright, screenwriter, editor, journalist
- Notable work: Nagavalli Nunchi Manjeera Varaku
- Title: Kalaprapoorna
- Spouse: Radha Kumari (m. 1960; died 2012)
- Children: Raavi Venkata Sasikumar
- Awards: Inturi Memorial Award Nandi Award for Best Story Writer Nandi Award for Best Book on Telugu Cinema

Raavi Kondala Rao (11 February 1932 – 28 July 2020) was an Indian actor, screenwriter, playwright, and journalist who worked in Telugu cinema and Telugu theatre. He acted in over 400 films. He won Nandi Award for Best Story Writer for Pelli Pusthakam (1991) and won Nandi Award for Best Book on Telugu Cinema for Black and White.

He made his film debut with Sobha in 1958 as an actor, and gained recognition as an actor with the 1964 film Preminchi Choodu. He was known for his collaborations with Bapu-Ramana. He worked as a writer for notable films like Brundavanam (1992), Bhairava Dweepam (1994), Sri Krishnarjuna Vijayam (1996).

Besides films, he worked as an editor, writer and columnist for English and Telugu newspapers and magazines. He worked as the associate editor for the then popular film magazine Vijaya Chitra from 1966 to 1990. Later, he joined Chandamama Vijaya production house as a writer and executive producer.

== Early life ==
Raavi Kondala Rao was born on 11 February 1932 in Srikakulam of present-day Andhra Pradesh. His father was a postmaster. His education had been done in Srikakulam. He participated in Satyagraha in 1948 in Rajahmundry against the ban on RSS and Hindu Mahasammelan and was put in jail for three months. In his free time in Rajahmundry Jail, he read many books on literature. He wrote stories under the pen name of 'Mana Oohalu'. A few stories had been published in Chandamama.

== Career ==
Raavi Kondala Rao used to write articles for Mahodaya weekly newspaper. He worked as sub editor for Aanandavani weekly magazine. He was a writer of 'Paata Bangaram' in Sitara magazine, owned by the Eenadu group. He used to write cinema articles for Andhra Jyothi, Vijaya Chitra.

Kodavatiganti Kutumba Rao was his inspiration for writing. Later, he was encouraged by Mullapudi Venkata Ramana, Gutha Ramineedu to act in films. He also worked as an assistant director for B. N. Reddy, Kamalakara Kameswara Rao, D. V. Narasa Raju. He was the assistant director for Nartanasala (1963), directed by Kamalakara Kameswara Rao. He also worked as an assistant director for Pooja Phalam (1964), directed by B. N. Reddy.

== Personal life ==
Veteran actress Radha Kumari was his wife. She was his co-star in nearly 100 films. His brother R. Kameswara rao was a leading dubbing artist.

Raavi Kondala Rao died of heart attack at a private hospital in Hyderabad, aged 88, on 28 July 2020. He is survived by his son, R. V. Sasikumar.

== Partial filmography ==
- Kutumba Gowravam (1957)
- Sobha (1958)
- Anna Thammudu (1958)
- Aada Pettanam (1958)
- Bhagya Devatha (1959)
- Dagudu Moothalu (1964) as Doctor
- Preminchi Choodu (1965)
- Thene Manasulu (1965)
- Veerabhimanyu (1965)
- Nirdoshi (1967)
- Aggimeedha Guggilam (1968) as 'Prajapramukhulu' Punyakoti
- Brahmachari (1968)
- Bangaru Sankellu (1968)
- Vintha Kapuram (1968) as Rayakota Raghavaiah
- Ardha Ratri (1969)
- Bhale Rangadu (1969)
- Gandikota Rahasyam (1969)
- Muhurtha Balam (1969) as Veerabhadraiah
- Sipayi Chinnayya (1969)
- Varakatnam (1969)
- Ali Baba 40 Dongalu (1970)
- Kodalu Diddina Kapuram (1970)
- Atthalu Kodallu (1971) (1971) as Madhava Rao
- Adrusta Jathakudu (1971)
- Amaayakuraalu (1971)
- Dasara Bullodu (1971)
- Jeevitha Chakram (1971)
- Kalam Marindi (1972) as guest appearance
- Muhammad bin Tughluq (1972)
- Neeti-Nijayiti (1972)
- Andala Ramudu (1973)
- Ammayi Pelli (1974)
- Annadammula Anubandham (1975)
- Moguda Pellama (1975)
- Zamindarugari Ammayi (1975) as Lakshmikantha Rao
- Dongalaku Donga (1977) as Hanumantha Rao
- Idekkadi Nyayam (1977)
- Savasagallu (1977)
- Dongala Veta (1978) as Major Bandaramaiah
- Mugguru Muggure (1978) as Head Museum Guard
- Dongalaku Saval (1979) as Retd. Major Pratapa Rao
- Erra Gulabeelu (1979)
- Rangoon Rowdy (1979)
- Ramayanamlo Pidakala Veta (1980)
- Sirimalle Navvindi (1980)
- Prema Simhasanam (1981) as Kesava Varma son of Raja Kalyana Varma
- Manishiko Charitra (1982)
- Chattaniki Veyyi Kallu (1983) as 'Heccharika' paper editor
- Ikanaina Marandi (1983)
- Nijam Chepite Nerama (1983)
- Anubandham (1984)
- Dongalu Baboi Dongalu (1984)
- Mangammagari Manavudu (1984)
- Dandayatra (1984)
- Nayakulaku Saval (1984) as Chintapandu Sivaramaiah
- Pralaya Simham (1984) as Inspector Narasimham
- Rama Rao Gopal Rao (1984) as College Principal Krishnamachari
- Raraju (1984)
- Aadapille Nayam (1985)
- Bullet (1985)
- Kotha Pelli Koothuru (1985)
- Chantabbai (1986)
- Dharmapeetam Daddarillindi(1986)
- Challani Ramayya Chakkani Seethamma (1986)
- Ide Naa Samadhanam (1986) as Royyala Rosaiah
- Padaharella Ammayi (1986)
- Kaboye Alludu (1987)
- Dabbevariki Chedu (1987)
- Maavoori Magaadu (1987)
- Bharya Bhartalu (1988)
- Chilipi Dampatulu (1988)
- Donga Kollu (1988)
- Pelli Chesi Choodu (1988)
- Ramudu Bheemudu (1988)
- Ugranethrudu (1988) as Lawyer Tirupathi Rao
- Chalaki Mogudu Chadastapu Pellam (1989)
- Chettu Kinda Pleader (1989)
- Paila Pachessu (1989)
- Dagudumuthala Dampathyam (1990)
- Prema Khaidi (1990)
- Edurinti Mogudu Pakkinti Pellam (1991)
- Pelli Pustakam (1991)
- Chitram Bhalare Vichitram (1991)
- Brundavanam (1992)
- Joker Mama Super Alludu (1992) as Shankaram master
- Parvathalu Panakalu (1992)
- Repati Koduku (1992)
- Srimaan Brahmachari (1992)
- Madam (1994)
- Shri Krishnarjuna Vijayam (1996)
- Rajahamsa (1998)
- Radha Gopalam (2005)
- Mee Sreyobhilashi (2007)
- King (2008)
- Oy! (2009)
- Varudu (2010)
- 365 Days (2015)

=== Other roles ===
Year	Title	Writer	Notes
1959	Daiva Balam	No	Assistant director
1964	Pooja Phalam	No	Assistant director
1991	Pelli Pustakam	Story	
1994	Bhairava Dweepam	Story	
2008	Ghatothkach	Dialogues	Telugu version

=== Television ===
- Radha Madhu
