= Abhishekam (TV series) =

Indian television series

- Genre: Soap opera
- Directed by: Dasari Narayana Rao; Haricharan; Lakshmi Srinivas; Venkat Sriramoju
- Country of origin: India
- Original language: Telugu
- No. of episodes: 4000

Production
- Producer: Dasari Padma
- Running time: 22 minutes
- Production company: Sowbhagya Media Ltd

Original release
- Network: ETV
- Release: 22 December 2008 – 1 February 2022

Abhishekam (Telugu: అభిషేకం; translation: Anointing) is an Indian Telugu soap opera that aired on ETV (Telugu). It aired from Monday to Saturday initially during prime time and later shifted to afternoons. It premiered on 22 December 2008 and is the longest running Telugu television soap opera. The series went off air on 1 February 2022.

== Plot ==
Abhishekam is a story of family relationships and human values.

Narasimham and Susheela have two children, Vinay and Sumathi. Vinay grows up hating his father because of Narasimham's alcoholism. Narasimham also harasses his wife on constant basis. Because of Narasimham Vinay's sister dies which causes Vinay to leave the house. He goes on to live with Mastaru (Eng translation Teacher) and his family in a village.

He stays with the family for twelve years during which Mastaru's daughter Rekha starts to love him. He rejects her love because of Rekha's grandmother who is against their union.

He becomes a software engineer and marries his boss's daughter Swathi.

One day he accidentally meets his mother and Mastaru. From whom he learns about critical health of Rekha. Urged by his mother and Mastaru he also marries Rekha to fulfill her last wish due to her critical status.

However, Rekha recovers and comes to Vinay's home. How Vinay deals with his wife Swathi forms the crux of the story.

== Cast ==
- Ravi Kiran
- Satish
- Mounica
- Sameera Sherief
- Chinna
- Ananya
- Saimantha
- Shyamala Devi
- Bangalore Padma
- Saimithra
- Dileep Teja
- Hari Teja
- Sainadh
- Kaushik
- Madhu Babu as Parvathaneni Harikrishna
- Vishnu Priya as Sirisha, Harikrishna's wife
- Kaaruna Bhushan as Subhadhra
- Sireesha Nulu as Archana
- Siddarth Varma
- Seetha Mahalakshmi
- Mirchi Madhavi
- Vandana Gollu as Subhadhra
- Priyanka as Haritha
- Varsha as Latha
- Seethamahalaxmi as Tulasi
- Pranay Hanumadla as Dev
- Hinduja Chowdary as Training Teacher
- Rohit Sahni as Pujari
- Jyothika Bobbili as Haritha
- Nawazshaan as Chakrapani
- Rupamuggalla as Latha
- Sridevi Kumrani as Sirisha's mother

== Production ==
During the COVID-19 pandemic, the production of the serial was halted indefinitely on 19 March 2020 and the airing stopped after inadequate bank episodes from 27 March 2020. Production resumed after three months on mid June 2020 and new episodes started broadcasting from 22 June 2020.
