= Rama Rajamouli =

Indian costume designer and film stylist

- Born: 14 July 1969 (age 56); Andhra Pradesh, India
- Occupation: Costume designer Film stylist
- Years active: 2001–present
- Spouse: S. S. Rajamouli (m. 2001)
- Children: 2
- Relatives: M. M. Keeravani (brother-in-law); V. Vijayendra Prasad (father-in-law); Gunnam Gangaraju (cousin)
- Family: See Koduri family

Rama Rajamouli is an Indian costume designer and film stylist, who primarily works in Telugu cinema. Rama made her debut with the 2001 film Student No: 1. She is known for her work in the films Magadheera (2009), Eega (2012), Baahubali: The Beginning (2015), Baahubali 2: The Conclusion (2017) and RRR (2022).

She is a three-time Nandi Award winner for Best Costume Designer. She was nominated along with Prashanti Tipirneni for Best Costume Design at the 42nd Saturn Awards and at the 12th Asian Film Awards for Baahubali: The Beginning and Baahubali 2: The Conclusion.

== Personal life ==
Rama married filmmaker S. S. Rajamouli in 2001, after the divorce of her previous marriage. Rajamouli calls her Chinni. Rajamouli adopted Karthikeya, Rama's son from her previous marriage. The couple also has an adopted daughter Mayookha. Karthikeya is married to Pooja Prasad, niece of actor Jagapathi Babu. Filmmaker Gunnam Gangaraju is her cousin.

== Career ==
Initially Rama entered the industry in 2001 as an actor by doing various small roles in the TV sitcom Amrutham, created and produced by her cousin Gangaraju Gunnam.

After marrying S. S. Rajamouli, she started her career as a costume designer with the film Student No. 1 (2001). Rama regularly works in her husband films as a costume designer and stylist. In an interview to TV9, Rama said that Amar Chitra Katha is her inspiration for costume designing in Baahubali. For the film RRR, Rama worked as an additional dialogue writer.

She was invited to join the Academy of Motion Picture Arts and Sciences in June 2024.

== Filmography ==
Key
†	Denotes films that have not yet been released

=== As a costume designer and stylist ===
List of Rama Rajamouli film credits
Year	Film	Notes
2001	Student No. 1	Debut film
2004	Sye	
2005	Chatrapathi	
2006	Vikramarkudu	
2007	Yamadonga	
2009	Magadheera	
2010	Maryada Ramanna	
2010	Nagavalli	
2012	Eega	
2015	Baahubali: The Beginning	
2017	Baahubali 2: The Conclusion	
2022	RRR	also additional dialogue writer
2027	Varanasi †	

=== As actress ===
List of television appearances
Year	Title	Role	Network	Ref.
2001–2002	Amrutham	Various	Gemini TV	

== Awards and nominations ==
Year	Award	Category	Work	Result
2008	Nandi Awards	Best Costume Designer	Yamadonga	Won
2009	Nandi Awards	Best Costume Designer	Magadheera	Won
2016	Ananda Vikatan Cinema Awards	Best Costume Designer	Baahubali: The Beginning	Won
2016	Saturn Awards	Best Costume Design	Baahubali: The Beginning	Nominated
2017	Nandi Awards	Best Costume Designer	Baahubali: The Beginning	Won
2018	Asian Film Awards	Best Costume Design	Baahubali 2: The Conclusion	Nominated
