= Padaharella Ammayi =

- Directed by: P. S. Krishna Mohan Reddy
- Written by: Madhu (dialogues)
- Screenplay by: P. S. Krishna Mohan Reddy
- Story by: Vasundhara
- Produced by: R. Dasaradha Rami Reddy
- Starring: Rajendra Prasad; Chitra
- Cinematography: Divakar
- Edited by: K. Ramgopal Reddy
- Music by: Sivaji Raja
- Production company: Sri Sailaja Films
- Release date: 2 October 1986
- Running time: 126 mins
- Country: India
- Language: Telugu

Padaharella Ammayi (transl. Sixteen Years Girl) is a 1986 Telugu-language comedy film, produced by R. Dasaradha Rami Reddyunder the Sri Sailaja Films banner and directed by P. S. Krishna Mohan Reddy. It stars Rajendra Prasad, Chitra and music composed by Sivaji Raja.

== Cast ==
- Rajendra Prasad as Chanti
- Chitra as Papai
- Suthi Veerabhadra Rao as Trilokadhipati
- Nutan Prasad as Babu Rao
- Dasari Narayana Rao as himself
- S. P. Balasubrahmanyam as himself
- Raavi Kondala Rao
- Kakarala
- Radha Kumari
- Jayalalita as Rekha
- Mamatha
- Chandana
- Jayamalini as herself

== Crew ==
- Art: Thota Yaadu
- Choreography: John Babu, Kumari
- Fights: Horseman Babu
- Dialogues: Madhu
- Lyrics: Veturi, Acharya Aatreya, Sirivennela Sitarama Sastry
- Playback: S. P. Balasubrahmanyam, P. Susheela, K. J. Yesudas, Vani Jayaram
- Music: Sivaji Raja
- Story: Vasundhara
- Editing: K. Ramgopal Reddy
- Cinematography: Divakar
- Producer: R. Dasaradha Rami Reddy
- Screenplay - Director: P. S. Krishna Mohan Reddy
- Banner: Sri Sailaja Films
- Release Date: 2 October 1986

== Soundtrack ==
Padaharella Ammayi

Film score by Sivaji Raja
- Released: 1986
- Genre: Soundtrack
- Length: 16:40
- Label: MGS Audio
- Producer: Sivaji Raja

Music composed by Sivaji Raja was released through MGS Audio Company. Lyrics were written by Veturi, Acharya Aatreya and Sirivennela Seetharama Sastry.

Track list
No.	Title	Lyrics	Singer(s)	Length
1.	"O Padahaarella Ammaayii"	Veturi	S. P. Balasubrahmanyam	4:02
2.	"Naa Prema Pandindhi Nee Pedavilona"	Acharya Aatreya	K. J. Yesudas, Vani Jayaram	4:26
3.	"Raa Raa Raa Sankellu Tenchukoni Raa"	Sirivennela Seetharama Sastry	S. P. Balasubrahmanyam, P. Susheela, Vani Jayaram	4:00
4.	"Manasukidi Saapam"	Sirivennela Seetharama Sastry	P. Susheela	4:12
Total length:				16:40
