= Radha Madhu =

Indian Telugu language TV series

- Genre: Romantic drama
- Created by: Gunnam Gangaraju
- Starring: Kalyan Prasad Thoram; Mounica
- Theme music composer: Vaibhav
- Opening theme: "Gadenaadu Kaalamu" sung by Pranavi
- Country of origin: India
- Original language: Telugu

Production
- Running time: 22 minutes
- Production company: Scorpio Productions

Original release
- Network: Maa TV
- Release: 2006 – 2008

Radha Madhu is a 2006–2008 Indian Telugu language romantic drama television series starring Kalyan Prasad Thoram and Mounica in the titular roles. The series was aired on Star Maa.

== Cast ==
=== Main ===
- Kalyan Prasad Thoram as Radha Krishna
- Mounica as Madhulika

=== Recurring ===
- Siva Parvathi as Raja Rajeshwari
- Lahari as Julie
- Devadas Kanakala / Raja Babu as Gopalam
- Shankar Melkote as Dr. Mitra
- Alapati Lakshmi as Adilakshmi
- Raavi Kondala Rao as Venkat Rao
- Radha Kumari as Janakamma
- Chalapathi Raju as Sai
- Ragini as Padma Shri
- Sai Mitra as Murthy
- Lakshmi
- Varamma
- Kumari
- Raghavaiah

== Production ==
While working in the HR department of a software company, assistant director Chinna offered Kalyan the opportunity to play one of the lead roles. The series was noted for being different from most Indian serials in the sense that there wasn't over-the-top emptional scenes for the sake of TRP. K. Sandhya Rani dubbed for one of the characters.

== Music ==
The soundtrack was composed by S. K. Balachandan while the theme song was composed by Vaibhav.

Radha Madhu (Original Soundtrack)
No.	Title	Music	Singer(s)	Length
1.	"Agadenaadu Kaalamu"	Vaibhav	Pranavi	2:36

== Reception and legacy ==
The serial was a hit and became one of the popular Telugu serials. The pairing of Kalyan and Mounica were well received from the audience and became household names.
