= Brundavanam =

- VCD Cover
- Directed by: Singeetam Srinivasa Rao
- Written by: D. V. Narasa Raju (dialogues)
- Screenplay by: Singeetam Srinivasa Rao
- Story by: Singeetam Srinivasa Rao
- Produced by: B. Venkatarama Reddy
- Starring: Rajendra Prasad; Ramya Krishna
- Cinematography: R. Devi Prasad
- Edited by: D. Raja Gopal
- Music by: Madhavapeddi Suresh
- Production company: Chandamama Vijaya Combines
- Release date: 27 November 1992
- Running time: 153 minutes
- Country: India
- Language: Telugu

Brundavanam is a 1992 Indian Telugu-language comedy film co-written and directed by Singeetam Srinivasa Rao. It stars Rajendra Prasad and Ramya Krishna, with music composed by Madhavapeddi Suresh. The film was produced by B. Venkatarama Reddy under the Chandamama Vijaya Combines banner. The film won two state Nandi Awards. It was commercially successful.

== Cast ==
- Rajendra Prasad as Ravi, Latha Devi’s husband
- Ramya Krishna as Latha Devi, Ravi’s wife
- Bhagyasri as Thara
- Satyanarayana as Panakala Swamy
- Subhalekha Sudhakar as Balu
- Gummadi as Jagannadham
- Raavi Kondala Rao as Ravi's father
- Nagesh as Perumallu
- Rallapalli as Jeedimetla Zamindar
- Ranganath as Guru Murthy
- KK Sarma as Broker Govinda Rao
- Chidathala Appa Rao as Watchman Appanna
- Anjali Devi as Lakshmi Devi
- Sri Lakshmi as Parvathi
- Radha Kumari as Ravi's mother
- Kalpana Rai as Appanna's wife

== Soundtrack ==
Brundavanam

Film score by Madhavapeddi Suresh
- Released: 1992
- Genre: Soundtrack
- Length: 22:16
- Label: AKASH Audio
- Producer: Madhavapeddi Suresh

Madhavapeddi Suresh chronology
Babai Hotel (1992)	Brundavanam (1992)	Madam (1994)

The music for Brundavanam was composed by Madhavapeddi Suresh, with lyrics by Vennelakanti. The soundtrack was released under Akash Audio.

No.	Title	Singer(s)	Length
1.	"Madhurame Sudha Ganam"	S. P. Balasubrahmanyam, S. Janaki	4:12
2.	"Oho Oho Bujji Pavurama"	S. P. Balasubrahmanyam, S. Janaki	4:20
3.	"Aa Roju Naa Rani"	S. P. Balasubrahmanyam, S. Janaki	4:20
4.	"Abbo Emi Vinta"	S. P. Balasubrahmanyam, S. Janaki	4:47
5.	"Miya Miya Maama Miya"	S. P. Balasubrahmanyam	4:37
Total length:			22:16

== Awards ==
Nandi Awards

- Best Screenplay Writer - Singeetam Srinivasa Rao
- Best Makeup Artist - M. Sathyam
