= Sainath =

Sainath is both a given name and a surname. Notable people with the name include:

- Palagummi Sainath (born 1957), Indian photojournalist
- Sainath Thotapalli (born 1956), Indian writer in Tollywood
- Tara Sainath, American computer scientist
