= Radha Kumari =

Indian actress

- Born: Radha Kumari; 1942; Vizianagaram
- Died: 8 March 2012 (aged 70); Hyderabad, India
- Occupation: Actress
- Spouse: Raavi Kondala Rao (1960–2012)
- Children: RV Sashikumar
- Parent(s): Ramana Murthy; Surya Prakasamma

Radha Kumari was an Indian veteran film actress who appeared in Telugu-language films. She acted in over 600 films in over four decades. She is well known for her humor and played mother or grandmother roles in most of her films.

== Film career ==
Radha Kumari was born in 1942 in a Padmasali family at Vizianagaram. She began her career as a stage actress aged 12 and had played various roles in about 10,000 plays. She married Raavi Kondala Rao, an actor and writer, after she entered into the film industry. She made her debut in the film Tene Manasulu with Raavi Kondala Rao and had played the on-screen wife and husband roles in over 100 films. Seen as the best choice to play good-hearted roles, she acted with top heroes of two generations. She won the "Nandi" award for her role in the film Mee Sreyobhilashi.

== Filmography ==
Year	Film	Role	Notes
1964	Vivaha Bandham		
1964	Dagudu Moothalu		
1965	Tene Manasulu		
1967	Poola Rangadu		
1968	Nenante Nene		
1970	Thaali Bottu		
1971	Adrusta Jathakudu		
1971	Dasara Bullodu	Nirmala's mother	
1973	Andala Ramudu		
1975	Bhagasthulu	Shanta	
1976	Secretary		
1976	Aadavalu Apanindhalu		
1978	Gorantha Deepam		
1978	Chilipi Krishnudu		
1978	Patnavasam	Kanthamma	
1981	Raja Paarvai (Tamil)		
1981	Amavasya Chandrudu		
1982	Naa Desam		
1983	Chandirani		
1984	Nayakulaku Saval		
1984	Rama Rao Gopal Rao a.k.a. Rao Gopal Rao	'Steel' Seetha	
1984	Anubandham		
1985	Preminchu Pelladu		
1985	Surya Chandra		
1985	Babayi-Abbayi		
1986	Padaharella Ammayi		
1987	Madana Gopaludu		
1987	Veera Prathap		
1987	Gundamma Gari Krishnulu		
1987	Manavadostunnadu		
1988	Choopulu Kalasina Subhavela		
1988	Brahma Putrudu		
1988	Jhansi Rani		
1989	Jayammu Nischayammu Raa		
1989	Rudranetra		
1989	Bandhuvulostunnaru Jagratha		
1989	Preminchi Choodu		
1990	Master Kapuram		
1990	Inspector Rudra		
1990	Prema Khaidi		
1991	Pelli Pustakam	Divya vani's mother	
1991	Chitram! Bhalare Vichitram!!	Raja's grandmother	
1991	Parama Sivudu		
1992	Valu Jada Tolu Beltu		
1992	Brundavanam		
1992	Prema Vijetha		
1993	Akka Chellelu		
1994	Madam		
1995	Pokiri Raja		
1996	Sri Krishnarjuna Vijayam		
2002	Nuvvu Leka Nenu Lenu	Radha Krishna's Grandmother	
2003	Okariki Okaru		
2005	Dhana 51		
2006	Sainikudu		
2007	Mee Sreyobhilashi		
2007	Chandamama	Dhorababu's Grandmother	
2008	Sangamam		
2008	King		
2009	Oy!	Rajyamma	
2009	Arya 2	Raji Reddy's mother	
2011	Brahmi Gadi Katha	Bhagya's grandmother	
2011	Nuvvila		
2012	Erra Gulabeelu		

Television

- Lady Detective (1995)
- Radha Madhu

== Death ==
She died on 8 March 2012.
