= Uyarndha Manithan =

1968 film by Krishnan–Panju

- Theatrical release poster
- Directed by: Krishnan–Panju
- Screenplay by: Javar Seetharaman
- Based on: Uttar Purush by Chitrakar
- Produced by: M. Murugan; M. Kumaran; M. Saravanan; M. Balasubramanian; M. S. Guhan
- Starring: Sivaji Ganesan; Sowcar Janaki
- Cinematography: P. N. Sundaram
- Edited by: S. Panjabi; O. Narasimhan
- Music by: M. S. Viswanathan
- Production company: AVM Productions
- Release date: 29 November 1968
- Running time: 168 minutes
- Country: India
- Language: Tamil

Uyarndha Manithan (transl. The Noble Man) is a 1968 Indian Tamil-language drama film written by Javar Seetharaman and directed by Krishnan–Panju. The film was produced by A. V. Meiyappan, M. Saravanan, M. Kumaran and M. Murugan under AVM Productions. It stars Sivaji Ganesan and Sowcar Janaki, while S. A. Ashokan, Major Sundarrajan, Vanisri and Sivakumar play pivotal roles. The film's soundtrack and background score were composed by M. S. Viswanathan, while the lyrics for the songs were written by Vaali.

The film was Sivaji Ganesan's 125th as an actor. It was a remake of the 1966 Bengali film Uttar Purush. The plot revolves around a wealthy industrialist's son who secretly marries the daughter of his family estate's accountant, only for his father to discover it and burn down the estate along with his son's pregnant wife, who is inside. The remainder of the film reveals the truth behind how she and her progeny survive.

Released on 29 November 1968, Uyarndha Manithan went on to become a commercial success, with a theatrical run of over 125 days. The film won the National Film Award for Best Female Playback Singer at the 16th National Film Awards for P. Susheela for the song "Paal Polave", making her the inaugural recipient of that category. It also won four Tamil Nadu State Film Awards, including Best Film (First prize) and Best Director for Krishnan–Panju.

== Plot ==
Rajalingam "Raju" is the son of a wealthy Madurai-based industrialist, Sankaralingam. Living with Raju is his driver and friend, Sundaram. While vacationing at his family estate in Kodaikanal with Sundaram and his family doctor, Gopal, Raju falls in love with a woman named Parvathi. Gopal too becomes smitten with Parvathi when he meets her whilst treating her father. Parvathi, who knows Raju through her father, as he is also an accountant of Raju's family estate, reciprocates Raju's feelings. Gopal decides not to reveal his love for Parvathi to Raju for Raju's sake. Raju and Parvathi marry in secret with the help of Gopal and the consent of Parvathi's father. The couple lives together in Kodaikanal without disclosing their marriage to Raju's father, Sankaralingam.

Three months later, Parvathi becomes pregnant. Sankaralingam, fearing for his son's safety, arrives at Kodaikanal and becomes furious upon finding out Raju's marriage to Parvathi. He orders his henchmen to set the estate on fire with Parvathi and her father inside. Raju and Gopal rush to save Parvathi, but they are stopped by Sankaralingam's henchmen and are forcefully returned to Madurai, leaving Parvathi and her father for dead. A few months after returning to Madurai, Raju is forced to marry his cousin Vimala. After the marriage, Sankaralingam hands over his business affairs to Raju and dies. Nineteen years pass. Despite having mutual affection for each other, Raju and Vimala remain childless and Raju is unable to forget Parvathi.

Nineteen-year-old Sathyamurthy, who lives with his uncle Murugan, is unable to retain any job due to his honest nature. He becomes acquainted with Gopal, with whose recommendation he becomes Raju's personal house servant. When Sathyamurthy displays his mother's photograph at his house to pray for her, it is revealed that Sathyamurthy is the son of Raju and Parvathi. Parvathi had survived the accident, was cared for by Murugan and died a few years after giving birth to Sathyamurthy without divulging the identity of Raju to Sathyamurthy and Murugan. Sathyamurthy improves his reading and writing skills with the help of Sundaram's daughter, Gowri and the two fall in love. When Raju learns of their love, he approves of their marriage. Gopal learns that Sathyamurthy is Raju's son, but dies of a heart attack before revealing it.

Jealous of Sathyamurthy's influence on Raju, another servant Rathnam and his wife hide Vimala's diamond necklace in Sathyamurthy's suitcase in an effort to get rid of him. Vimala, upset at losing her necklace, searches the house for it. When Raju, Sundaram, Gowri, and Sathyamurthy return after attending a conference in Kodaikanal, Vimala, acting on Rathnam's provocation, orders that Sathyamurthy's suitcase is searched. When the necklace is found in it, Raju throws Sathyamurthy out of his house, despite Sathyamurthy proclaiming his innocence. Gowri then shows Parvathi's photograph to Raju, who is shocked to learn that Sathyamurthy is his own son. Raju reveals the truth about Parvathi to Vimala, who also accepts Sathyamurthy as her son. Before Raju and Vimala rush to bring Sathyamurthy back, Raju learns of a fire breaking out in one of his mills. Sathyamurthy, unhappy of being wrongly accused by Raju, attempts suicide by entering the burning mill. Raju saves Sathyamurthy in time and reveals the truth about his birth to him. The family is united and Sathyamurthy marries Gowri.

== Cast ==
Adapted from the opening credits:

- Sivaji Ganesan as Rajalingam "Raju"
- Sowcar Janaki as Vimala
- S. A. Ashokan as Gopal
- Major Sundarrajan as Sundaram
- Vanisri as Parvathi
- Bharathi as Gowri
- Manorama as Rani
- G. Sakunthala as Pankajam Raman
- Seethalakshmi as Swarnam
- Sivakumar as Sathyamoorthy
- V. K. Ramasamy as Rathnam
- V. Nagayya as Manickam
- S. V. Ramadas as Sankaralingam
- V. S. Raghavan as Murugan
- Poornam Viswanathan as Ranganathan
- S. N. Parvathi as Lakshmi
- Typist Gopu as Kittu

== Production ==
=== Development ===
V. A. P. Iyer, a Kolkata-based friend of AVM Productions founder A. V. Meiyappan, told Meiyappan that a Bengali film named Uttar Purush (1966) was running well. After watching the film, Meiyappan was impressed and decided to remake it into what would become Uyarndha Manithan. Javar Seetharaman was hired as screenwriter, and made a few alterations to the screenplay, while the duo Krishnan–Panju (R. Krishnan and S. Panju) were signed to direct. P. N. Sundaram was hired as the cinematographer, and Panju edited the film under the pseudonym "Panjabi".

=== Casting ===
When the script was ready, Meiyappan's sons and the film's co-producers M. Saravanan, M. Kumaran and M. Murugan narrated it to Sivaji Ganesan at his residence, Annai Illam. Ganesan initially refused to play the main character, Raju, as he felt the supporting character Gopal had more impact than Raju, and offered to act as Gopal. However, on Saravanan's insistence, Ganesan played the role of Raju, and the role of Gopal went to S. A. Ashokan. Uyarndha Manithan became the 125th film to star Ganesan, and his first with AVM since Pachhai Vilakku (1964). When M. Saravanan asked about Ganesan's salary to Ganesan's younger brother V. C. Shanmugham, who spoke on Ganesan's behalf, Shanmugham said that Ganesan was willing to accept any amount that AVM could afford to offer. Taking this to be a vague statement as Shanmugham did not state Ganesan's salary properly, Saravanan discovered that Ganesan accepted ₹200,000 (US$26,667 in 1968) (Note: The exchange rate in 1968 was 7.50 Indian rupees (₹) per 1 US dollar (US$).) for one of A. P. Nagarajan's latest films. Since Thiruvilaiyadal (1965), Nagarajan's films were made in Eastmancolor, and because Uyarndha Manidhan was made in black-and-white and costume designing for the film was less as compared to those of Nagarajan's films, M. Saravanan decided to pay ₹150,000 (US$20,000 in 1968) to Ganesan. Sowcar Janaki, who portrayed Raju's possessive wife Vimala, felt her character was depicted "negatively", so some changes to the character were made at her request. This was the debut film for Poornam Viswanathan, who portrayed Vimala's father.

=== Filming ===
Principal photography began in Kodaikanal. The first song sequence shot was "Velli Kinnamthan", depicting Raju and Parvathi (Vanisri) in a boat. The song "En Kelvikkenna Badhil", depicting Sathyamoorthy (Sivakumar) and Gowri (Bharathi), was shot at Kodaikanal and My Lady Garden, Madras (now Chennai). Meiyappan was not pleased with the original song sequence shown to him by the production unit as he felt it was incongruous to have two poor characters dressed well in modern attire, so it was reshot. The song "Paal Polave" was initially meant to be shot at Kodaikanal, but due to unfavourable weather conditions, the shoot had to be called off. The film's art director, A. K. Sekhar, therefore constructed a specially erected set at AVM Studios in Madras that resembled Kodaikanal's misty ambience. Ganesan assisted Ashokan for acting in the scene where Gopal dies of a heart attack.

It was speculated that a production company bought the remake rights of The Parent Trap (1961) in Hindi and titled it as Vapas. (Note: Saravanan does not mention the production company's name.) AVM had already acquired the rights to the film, which they were making under the title Do Kaliyan (1968). (Note: The Parent Trap was earlier remade in Tamil as Kuzhandaiyum Deivamum (1965). Both Do Kaliyaan and Kuzhandaiyum Deivamum were produced by AVM Productions.) To avoid a clash with that film, AVM stalled production on Uyarndha Manithan for eight months to focus on Do Kaliyan. Ganesan, who thought that the project had been shelved, went to inform AVM that he would commence filming with another technical crew. However, AVM convinced him that the shooting was only delayed, and paid him ₹50,000 (US$6,667 in 1968) in advance. After the release of Do Kaliyan, filming resumed. (Note: Ganesan completed his portions in Kaaval Dheivam (1969) for five days in between the schedules of Uyarndha Manithan upon M. Saravanan's permission.) When filming resumed after a year, Ganesan and Janaki refused to act along each other due to a fallout they had at a public forum but later relented after the producers convinced them. During the shoot, Ganesan noted Janaki's sari colour was changed as she wore a black sari in the film's previous shoot. Janaki initially refused to believe; however after seeing the rushes, she realised her error and apologised to Ganesan.

For the scene where Raju beats and throws Sathyamurthy out of his house, multiple canes were kept as backup in case the cane with which Ganesan beats Sivakumar broke. Sivakumar was eventually left with his right arm dislocated after being kicked by Ganesan and falling over the sofa, and was hospitalised. The climax, where Raju rushes to the burning mill to save Sathyamurthy, took four to six days to film. The final length of the film's prints were 4,591 metres (15,062 ft) long.

== Themes ==
In his 2015 book Madras Studios: Narrative, Genre, and Ideology in Tamil Cinema, Swarnavel Eswaran Pillai notes that the title Uyarndha Manithan, meaning "A Honourable Man", epitomises the contradiction within the character of Raju, and in the trajectory of the rebel in Parasakthi (1952), as he finally ends up a "meek/reactionary family man" who had forsaken his own offspring/lineage at a critical juncture.

== Music ==
The soundtrack and musical score for Uyarndha Manithan were composed by M. S. Viswanathan, while the lyrics were written by Vaali. Vaali worked on the film alongside Adimai Penn (1969) and felt that working on two films simultaneously was "torrid". Mangalamurthy worked as the accordionist for the song "Paal Polave", also known as "Naalai Intha Velai Paarthu". In the composition and picturisation for the song "Andha Naal Gnaabagam", Viswanathan was inspired by a sequence in My Fair Lady (1964) in which Rex Harrison's character sings with a walking stick in hand on a golf course. M. Saravanan, in his book AVM 60 Cinema, described the use of dialogues in "Andha Naal Gnaabagam" as something new to Tamil cinema. The song was parodied by Vikram and Vivek in Dhool (2003), and "Paal Polave" was parodied by Santhanam in Yuvan Yuvathi (2011).

The soundtrack was received positively by critics, with "Andha Naal Gnaabagam" and "Paal Polave" attaining popularity. Malathi Rangarajan of The Hindu praised the bossa nova portions in the song "Velli Kinnamthan". News Today described "Andha Naal Gnaabagam" as "testament to the capabilities of two legends – TM. Soundarajan and Sivaji Ganesan", adding that the "transition from Sivaji panting and TMS taking over is seamless".

Track listing
No.	Title	Singer(s)	Length
1.	"Aththaanin Muththangal"	P. Susheela	03:43
2.	"Andha Naal Gnaabagam"	T. M. Soundararajan	05:47
3.	"En Kelvikkenna Badhil"	T. M. Soundararajan, P. Susheela	03:45
4.	"Velli Kinnamthan"	T. M. Soundararajan, P. Susheela	03:39
5.	"Paal Polave (Naalai Intha Velai Paarthu)"	P. Susheela	04:50
6.	"Aththai Magal"	P. Susheela	03:38
Total length:			25:24

== Release and reception ==
Uyarndha Manithan was released on 29 November 1968. An event was organised in Chennai to celebrate its release, and it was attended by Yashwantrao Chavan, then the Home Minister of India. The film became a commercial success, completing a theatrical run of 125 days. The 125th day commemorative celebrations were held in the presence of C. N. Annadurai, the then Chief Minister of Tamil Nadu. This was also the last function which Annadurai attended before his death.

=== Critical reception ===
On 7 December 1968, the critic from The Indian Express lauded the performances of the cast members, particularly Ganesan, Janaki, Ashokan, Vanisri and Sundararajan along with Ramaswamy's comedy and Sundaram's cinematography, but criticised the "predictable" climax, editing and musical score, adding, "But directors Krishnan and Panju see to it that the picture does not fall apart. There lies their moderate success." On Ganesan's performance, the Tamil magazine Ananda Vikatan, wrote in a review dated 15 December 1968 that Ganesan proved that he could show both love and hate at the same time, and no more than words of 'natural acting' were enough for him.

=== Accolades ===
The National Film Award for Best Female Playback Singer was introduced in 1968, and Susheela won the award for her rendition of "Paal Polave". It was also Ganesan's first film to win a Tamil Nadu State Film Award.

Award	Ceremony	Category	Nominee(s)	Outcome	Ref.
National Film Awards	16th National Film Awards	Best Female Playback Singer	P. Susheela	Won	
Tamil Nadu State Film Awards	2nd Tamil Nadu State Film Awards	Best Film (First prize)	A. V. Meiyappan	Won	
Tamil Nadu State Film Awards	2nd Tamil Nadu State Film Awards	Best Director	Krishnan–Panju	Won	
Tamil Nadu State Film Awards	2nd Tamil Nadu State Film Awards	Best Female Playback Singer	P. Susheela	Won	
Tamil Nadu State Film Awards	2nd Tamil Nadu State Film Awards	Best Cinematographer	P. N. Sundaram	Won	

== Legacy ==
My first national award came for the song ”Naalai intha velai parthu’ ["Paal Polave"] (from 1969’s [Uyarndha] Manithan), which Vaali wrote. How can I ever forget that? I will never forget him.

— Susheela attributing her success for the song "Paal Polave" to Vaali.

The song "Andha Naal Gnaabagam" was considered one of the most memorable songs written by Vaali that featured in a Sivaji Ganesan film. Rediff ranked it alongside "Madhavi Pon Mayilaal" from Iru Malargal (1967) and "Potri Paadadi Penne" from Thevar Magan (1992).

Susheela chose "Paal Polave" along with "Unnai Ondru Ketpen" (Note: From Puthiya Paravai (1964).) and "Paartha Gnaabagam Illaiyo" as her favourite songs that she had recorded. Singer Swarnalatha, who made her debut with the song "Chinnanchiru Kiliye" from Neethikku Thandanai (1987), was chosen to sing the song by M. S. Viswanathan after he was impressed with her rendition of "Paal Polave", which he had asked her to sing during the song's audition.

Ganesan's biographer T. S. Narayanswami included Uyarndha Manithan in his list of Ganesan's "all-time greats". In March 2009, Sharadha Narayanan of The New Indian Express rated Sundarrajan's performance in the film among his other noted films in which he featured like Vennira Aadai (1965), Major Chandrakanth (1966) and Gnana Oli. In her review of the 2011 film Seedan, Malathi Rangarajan of The Hindu said that the premise of the film was "on the lines of Sivaji Ganesan's poignant Uyarndha [Manithan]". Uyarndha Manithan was included with other Sivaji Ganesan-starrers in the compilation DVD 8th Ulaga Adhisayam Sivaji, featuring Ganesan's "iconic performances in the form of scenes, songs and stunts". It was released in May 2012.

== Bibliography ==
- Ganesan, Sivaji; Narayana Swamy, T. S. (2007) [2002]. Autobiography of an Actor: Sivaji Ganesan, October 1928 – July 2001. Sivaji Prabhu Charities Trust. OCLC 297212002.
- Pillai, Swarnavel Eswaran (2015). Madras Studios: Narrative, Genre, and Ideology in Tamil Cinema. SAGE Publications. ISBN 978-93-5150-212-8.
- Saravanan, M. (2013) [2005]. AVM 60 Cinema (in Tamil) (3rd ed.). Rajarajan Pathippagam. OCLC 1158347612.
