= Madhavapeddi Suresh =

Indian composer and singer (born 1951)

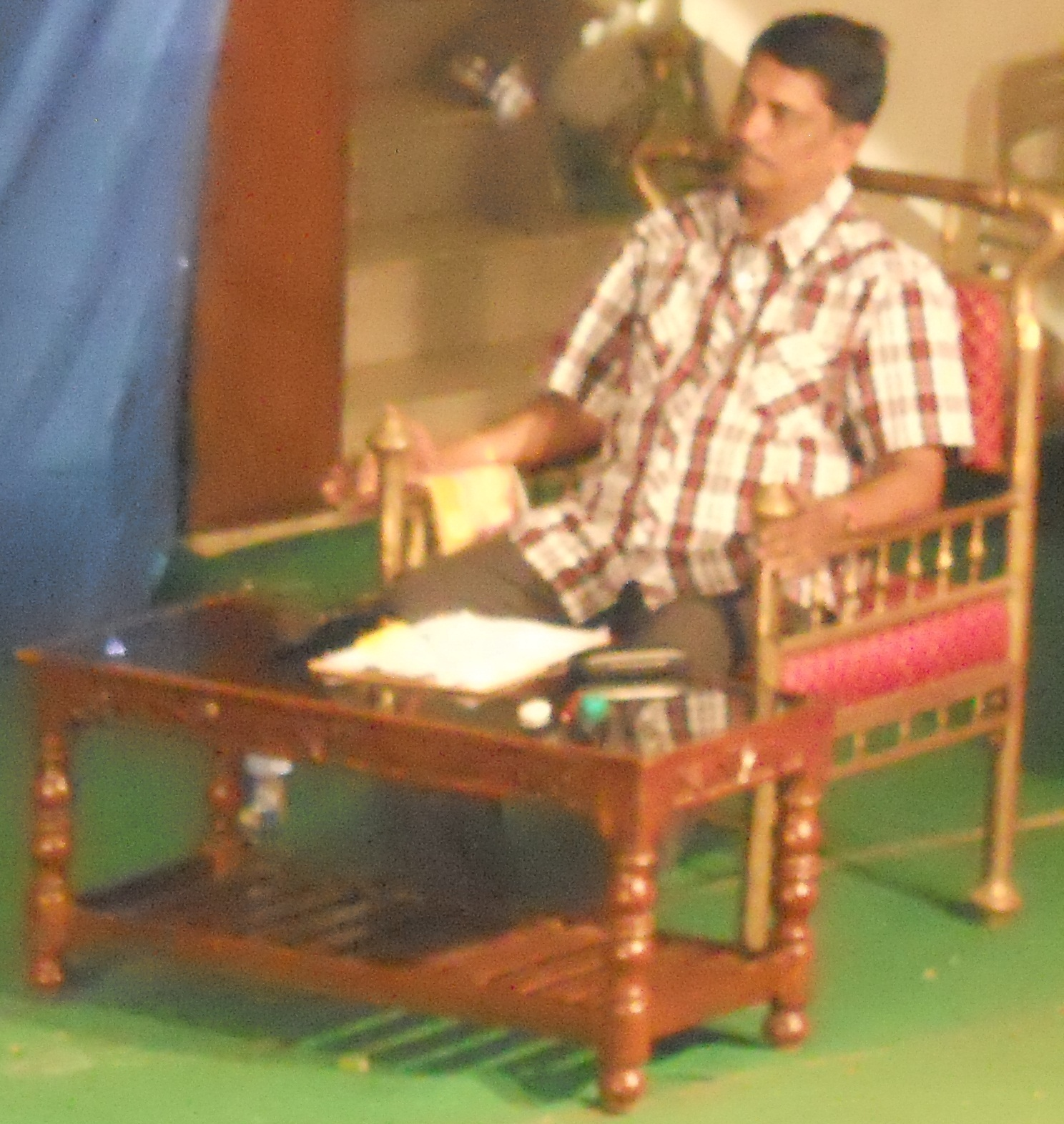
- Born: Madhavapeddi Suresh; 8 September 1951 (age 75); Tenali, Andhra Pradesh, India
- Occupations: Composer, Singer
- Years active: 1989 - present
- Spouse: Nirmala
- Children: Sarath, Lakshmi
- Parents: Nageswara Rao (father); Vasundhara (mother)
- Relatives: Madhavapeddi Satyam

Madhavapeddi Suresh is an Indian music composer and playback singer who works in Telugu cinema and television. He is the recipient of four Andhra Pradesh state Nandi Awards for his works.

A close relative of noted playback singer Madhavapeddi Satyam, Suresh began his career at the age of 16 as a harmonium player in Vijayawada. His first film was Parivartana (1975), in which he played accordion in the troupe of music director T. Chalapathi Rao. Later he became a keyboard player and worked for many famous composers in around 1,500 films in recording and re-recording.

Suresh debuted as a music director with the film Hai Hai Nayaka (1989) directed by his collegemate Jandhyala. Later, he composed music for over 60 films including Brundavanam (1992), Bhairava Dweepam (1994), Madam (1994), Maatho Pettukoku (1995), Ramayanam (1997). He received the Nandi Award for Best Music Director for the film Sri Krishnarjuna Vijayam (1996).

Suresh is also the first in-house music director for ETV. He worked in their serials for seven years and also composed the title song for the supernatural serial Anveshitha (1997–1999). Of the four Nandi Awards he had won, two were for his contribution in the television field.

== Life ==
Madhavapeddi Suresh is born on 8 September 1951 in Tenali to Vasundhara Devi and Nageswara Rao. Suresh is a close relative of noted playback singer Madhavapeddi Satyam. He began his career at the age of 16 in 1967 as a harmonium player in Bhawana Kala Simithi, Vijayawada.

His first film was Parivartana (1975) in which he played accordion in the troupe of music director T. Chalapathi Rao. Later he became a keyboard player and worked for famous composers like Naushad, R. D. Burman, M. S. Viswanathan, K. V. Mahadevan, Ramesh Naidu, Laxmikant–Pyarelal, Bappi Lahiri and worked for about 1,500 films in recording and re-recording. He was a keyboard player for playback singer S. P. Balasubrahmanyam’s tours abroad from 1979 to 1985.

Jandhyala and Sutti Veerabhadra Rao studied in the same college as Suresh in Vijayawada. Jandhyala introduced him as a music director for Hai Hai Nayaka (1989). Suresh got a major success with his sixth film Brundavanam (1992). He followed it up with Bhairava Dweepam (1994), Madam (1994), Maatho Pettukoku (1995), Ramayanam (1996). He won the state Nandi Award for Best Music Director for Sri Krishnarjuna Vijayam (1996). He scored music for three Chandamama-Vijaya Combines films in a row and collaborated with Singeetam Srinivasa Rao in those three films.

He is also the first in-house music director for ETV. He worked for ETV serials for seven years. He composed the title song for ETV's supernatural TV serial Anveshitha (1997–1999). Of the four Nandi Awards he won, two awards were for his contribution to the television.

== Career ==
- Hai Hai Nayaka (1989)
- Prema Zindabad (1990)
- Rambha Rambabu (1990)
- Parvathalu Panakalu (1992)
- Brundavanam (1992)
- Babai Hotel (1992)
- Bhairava Dweepam (1994)
- Madam (1994)
- Maatho Pettukoku (1995)
- Maya Bazaar (1995)
- Ramayanam (1996)
- Tata Manavadu (1996)
- Sri Krishnarjuna Vijayam (1996)
- Kutumba Gouravam (1997)
- Awaragadu (1998)
- Aavide Syamala (1999)
- Nee Sukhame Ne Koruthunna (2008)

== Awards ==
- Nandi Award for Best Music Director - Sri Krishnarjuna Vijayam (1996)
- Saluri Pratibha Puraskaram in 2013.
