= Sri Krishnarjuna Vijayam =

1996 Indian film by Singeetam Srinivasa Rao

- Theatrical release poster
- Directed by: Singeetam Srinivasa Rao
- Screenplay by: Singeetam Srinivasa Rao
- Story by: Raavi Kondala Rao
- Produced by: B. Venkatarama Reddy
- Starring: Nandamuri Balakrishna; Roja
- Cinematography: R. Raghunatha Reddy
- Edited by: D. Raja Gopal
- Music by: Madhavapeddi Suresh
- Production company: Chandamama Vijaya Combines
- Release date: 15 May 1996
- Running time: 157 minutes
- Country: India
- Language: Telugu

Sri Krishnarjuna Vijayam (transl. 'Victory of Sri Krishna and Arjuna') is a 1996 Indian Telugu-language Hindu mythological film, produced by B. Venkatarama Reddy under the Chandamama Vijaya Combines banner and directed by Singeetam Srinivasa Rao. It stars Nandamuri Balakrishna, and Roja, with music composed by Madhavapeddi Suresh. The film won four Nandi Awards. However, it was a box-office flop.

== Plot ==
The film begins in Hastinapuram, where Bhima and Duryodhana compete in a mace duel during a tournament. The competition escalates into a dispute, prompting Dronacharya to declare them equally skilled. Arjuna impresses everyone with his archery skills, earning Dronacharya’s praise. Karna arrives to challenge Arjuna but is insulted due to his caste. Duryodhana, aided by Sakuni, crowns Karna as the king of Anga, forging a strong bond between them. Kunti secretly recognizes Karna as her son but remains silent out of fear of societal repercussions.

Dronacharya later asks Arjuna for Guru Dakshina, requesting him to capture Drupada, the king of Panchala, who had once humiliated him. Arjuna successfully defeats Drupada and presents him before Dronacharya, fulfilling his mentor's wish. Humiliated by his defeat, Drupada vows revenge. Krishna advises him to perform the Putrakameshti yagna, through which Drupada begets twins—Dhrushtadyumna, destined to slay Drona, and Draupadi, destined to marry Arjuna. Draupadi has adored Krishna since childhood, who treats her as his sister.

Dharmaraju is crowned as the prince of Hastinapuram, inciting envy among the Kauravas, especially Duryodhana. Concerned for her sons' safety, Kunti prays to Krishna, who vows to protect and guide the Pandavas. During a visit to Dvārakā, the Pandavas meet Krishna, who commissions the divine architect Mayasura (Maya) to construct a magnificent palace, the "Mayasabha." Draupadi also joins them and secretly admires Arjuna. Sage Narada gifts Krishna a fruit and asks him to give it to his favourite person. As Krishna prepares to share it, he accidentally cuts his finger. Draupadi quickly tears a piece of her saree to bandage the wound. Moved by her gesture, Krishna promises to repay her kindness when the time comes.

During their journey to expand their kingdom, the Pandavas reach Rameswaram, where Arjuna observes the Rama Setu. Narada appears and questions why Lord Rama relied on Vanaras to build the bridge despite being a skilled archer capable of constructing one with arrows. Arjuna responds, claiming that a bridge made of arrows would be highly potent and indestructible. Hearing this, Anjaneya challenges Arjuna to prove his claim by building a bridge that can withstand his weight. Twice, Anjaneya destroys Arjuna’s bridges, frustrating him. Determined, Arjuna vows to immolate himself if his final attempt fails. This time, the bridge holds firm, and Arjuna discovers that Krishna had secretly supported its foundation. Realising Krishna’s divine nature as Lord Rama, Anjaneya seeks forgiveness and agrees to adorn Arjuna’s chariot as a flag.

Meanwhile, Duryodhana and Sakuni conspire to eliminate the Pandavas. They build a wax palace in Varanasi and invite the Pandavas under the pretense of a royal ritual. Krishna forewarns Bhima, who digs a tunnel to escape. When the palace is set ablaze, the Pandavas and Kunti escape through the tunnel. They later take refuge in the forest, where Bhima marries Hidimbi after defeating her brother Hidimbasura, a rakshasa. The couple has a son, Ghatotkacha. The Pandavas, disguised as Brahmins, settle in Ekachakrapuram on sage Vyasa’s advice.

In Ekachakrapuram, a monstrous demon named Bakasura terrorizes the region, demanding two oxen, a cartload of food, and one person each day. When the turn comes for the Pandavas' host family, Kunti sends Bheema in their place. Bheema battles and slays Bakasura, liberating the region from his tyranny.

Meanwhile, King Drupada organizes a svayamvara for Draupadi, offering her hand in marriage to the victor of a challenging archery contest. Renowned rulers, including Salya, Jarasandha, and Duryodhana, fail to meet the challenge. Krishna subtly ensures Karna's disqualification. Disguised as a Brahmin, Arjuna succeeds in the contest, revealing the Pandavas' true identities. Draupadi is brought home, and in a misunderstanding, Kunti instructs her sons to share what they have brought, unknowingly referring to Draupadi. This creates a dilemma, but Krishna intervenes, justifying Kunti's words and blessing Draupadi's marriage to all five Pandavas. The narrative concludes with Draupadi becoming their wife, symbolizing unity and harmony.

== Cast ==
- Nandamuri Balakrishna as Lord Krishna and Arjuna (Dual role)
- Roja as Draupadi
- Rambha as Apsara
- Priya Raman as Rukmini
- Naresh as Narada
- Srihari as Duryodhana
- Daggupati Raja as Karna
- Subhalekha Sudhakar
- Vinod as Dhrishtadyumna
- Chakrapani as Yudhishthira
- Vijaya Rangaraju as Bheema
- Mikkilineni as Dhritarashtra
- Arja Janardhan Rao as Lord Hanuman
- Padmanabham as Purochana
- Raavi Kondala Rao as Mayudu
- Sakshi Ranga Rao as Sumitrudu
- Suthi Velu as priest
- Nagesh
- AVS as Shakuni
- Eeswar Rao as Vidura
- P. J. Sarma as Kripa Acharya
- Gokina Rama Rao as Bhishma
- Kallu Chidambaram as Bhojara
- Ramaraju as Gandharva
- Bheemeswara Rao
- K. R. Vijaya as Kunti
- Srikanya as Satyabhama
- Jayalalita as Hidimba
- Rama Prabha
- Radha Kumari
- Attili Lakshmi
- Renuka
- Ujjala
- Madhurima
- Sridivya
- Sajanva
- Rachana
- Alekhya
- Sailaja
- Padmasri
- Master Baladitya as Young Krishna
- Kalyankumar as Drupada

== Production ==
The film was influenced by Sri Krishna Pandaveeyam (1966), which starred Balakrishna's father, N. T. Rama Rao.

== Music ==
Sri Krishnarjuna Vijayam

Film score by Madhavapeddi Suresh
- Released: 1996
- Genre: Soundtrack
- Length: 26:59
- Label: Supreme Music
- Producer: Madhavapeddi Suresh

Madhavapeddi Suresh chronology
Bala Ramayanam (1996)	Sri Krishnarjuna Vijayam (1996)	Puttinti Gowravam (1996)

Music was composed by Madhavapeddi Suresh. Audio soundtrack was released on Supreme Music Company label.

No.	Title	Lyrics	Singer(s)	Length
1.	"Bhalee Bhalee"	Vennelakanti	S. Janaki, B. A. Narayana	4:55
2.	"Ee Neeti Uyyaala"	C. Narayana Reddy	S. P. Balasubrahmanyam, Chitra	4:16
3.	"Nadichaedhi Jeevudu"	Vennelakanti	S. Janaki	3:17
4.	"Priyaa Pilupu Andhera"	C. Narayana Reddy	S. P. Balasubrahmanyam, Chitra	4:18
5.	"Saaho Mahaa Veerudaa"	Veturi	S. Janaki	4:33
6.	"Swaram Charanam"	Sirivennela Sitarama Sastry	S. P. Balasubrahmanyam, Chitra	5:40
Total length:				26:59

== Awards ==
Nandi Awards

- Best Music Director – Madhavapeddi Suresh
- Best Costume Designer - G. Babu
- Best Makeup Artist - Sathyam
- Best Art Director - G. Chalam
