= Nandi Award for Best Makeup Artist =

Indian film award

This is the complete list of recipients of the Nandi Award for Best Makeup Artist since 1991.

Year	Artist	Film
2016	Ranjith	Arddhanaari
2015	R. Madhava Rao	Daana Veera Soora Karna
2014	Krishna	Sani Devudu
2013	Sivakumar	Jagadguru Adi Shankara
2012	Chittoru Srinivas	Krishnam Vande Jagadgurum
2011	P. Rama Babu	Sri Rama Rajyam
2010	Sri Gangadhar	Brahmalokam To Yamalokam Via Bhoolokam
2009	Mallikharjuna Rao	Vengamamba
2008	Ramesh Mahanthi	Arundhati
2007	Nalla Seenu	Yamadonga
2006	Ramachandra Rao	Sri Ramadasu
2005	R. V. Raghava	Subash Chandra Bose
2004	Chandra Rao	Anji
2003	Anji Babu	Harivillu
2002	Kishore	Khadgam
2001	Shyam Zadcharla	Thiladanam
2000	A Sekhar Babu	Hindustan The Mother
1999	Rama Chandra Rao	Seetharama Raju
1998	Raghava	Ganesh
1997	T. Mallikharjuna Rao	Annamayya
1996	Sathyam	Sri Krishnarjuna Vijayam
1995	M.Chandra Rao	Ammoru
1994	M.Satyam	Bhairava Dweepam
1993	Nageswara Rao	Mr. Pellam
1992	M. Satyam	Brundavanam
1991	Sobhalatha	Chanti
