= Nandi Award for Best Costume Designer =

Indian film award

This is the list of Nandi Award for Best Costume Designer winners since 1985.

Year	Artist	Film
2016	V. Thirumaleswar Rao	Sri Chilukur Balaji
2015	Rama Rajamouli; Prashanti Tipirneni	Baahubali: The Beginning
2014	Uddandu	Ori Devudoi
2013	Thirumala	Jagadguru Adi Shankara
2012	Thirumala	Krishnam Vande Jagadgurum
2011	Nikhil Dawan; Baasha	Anaganaga O Dheerudu
2010	Peruboyina Ramesh	Varudu
2009	Rama Rajamouli	Magadheera
2008	Deepa Chandar	Arundhati
2007	Rama Rajamouli	Yamadonga
2006	Basha	Sri Ramadasu
2005	Basha	Subhash Chandra Bose
2004	Murali	Santhi Sandesam
2003	P Rambabu	Vasantham
2002	Ganapathi	Avunu Valliddaru Ista Paddaru
2001	Ghalib	Jabili
2000	Giri	Sri Sai Mahima
1999	Rambabu	Samarasimha Reddy
1998	Thota Sai	Anthahpuram
1997	Thota Baburao	Annamayya
1996	G. Babu	Sri Krishnarjuna Vijayam
1995	Koteswar Rao	Sogasu Chuda Taramaa?
1994	T. Kondala Rao	Bhairava Dweepam
1993	Manohar Reddy	Prema Pusthakam
1992	Sai	Rajeswari Kalyanam
1991	A. Samba Siva Rao	Aditya 369
1990	M. Krishna	Jagadeka Veerudu Athiloka Sundari
1989	Kondaiyya	Mouna Poratam
1988	Apparao	Inspector Pratap
1987	P. Venkata Rao	Viswanatha Nayakudu
1986	Kameswara Rao	Tandra Paparayudu
1985	N. Apparao	Devalayam
