= List of Telugu film actresses =

This is a list of notable actresses who have played key roles in the Telugu cinema, primarily based in Andhra Pradesh and Telangana.

Prominent actresses of Telugu cinema across decades

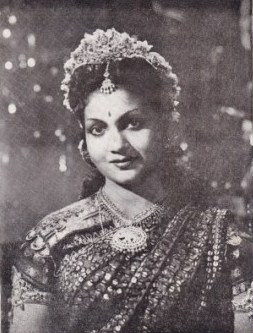
1940s: Anjali Devi

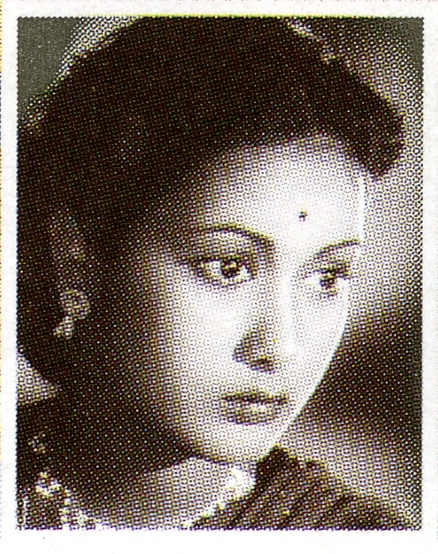
1950s: Savitri

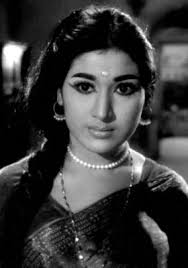
1960s: Vanisri

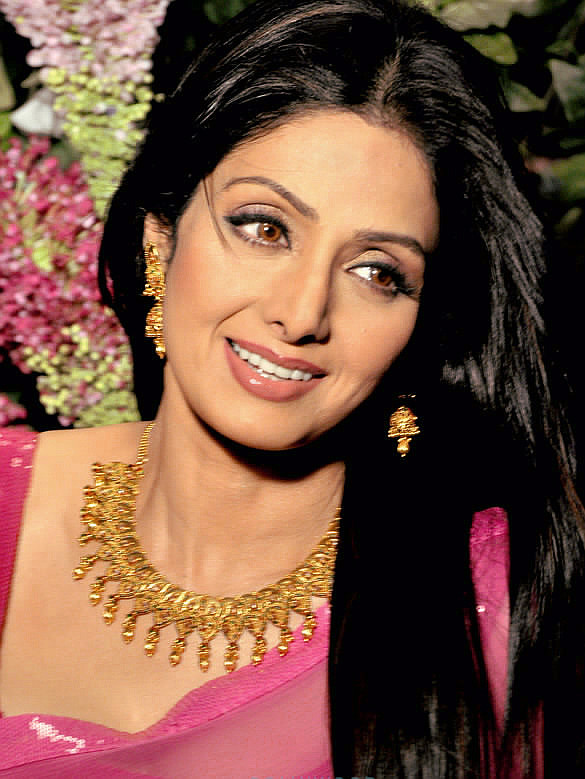
1970s: Sridevi

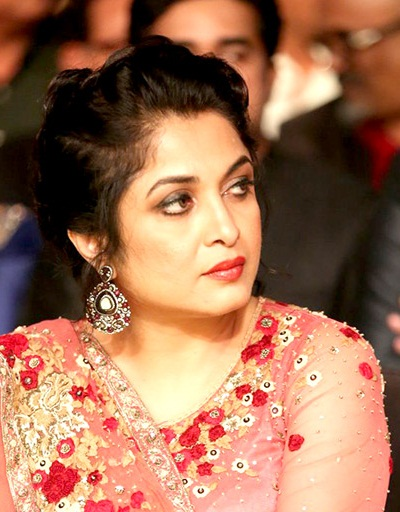
1980s: Ramya Krishna

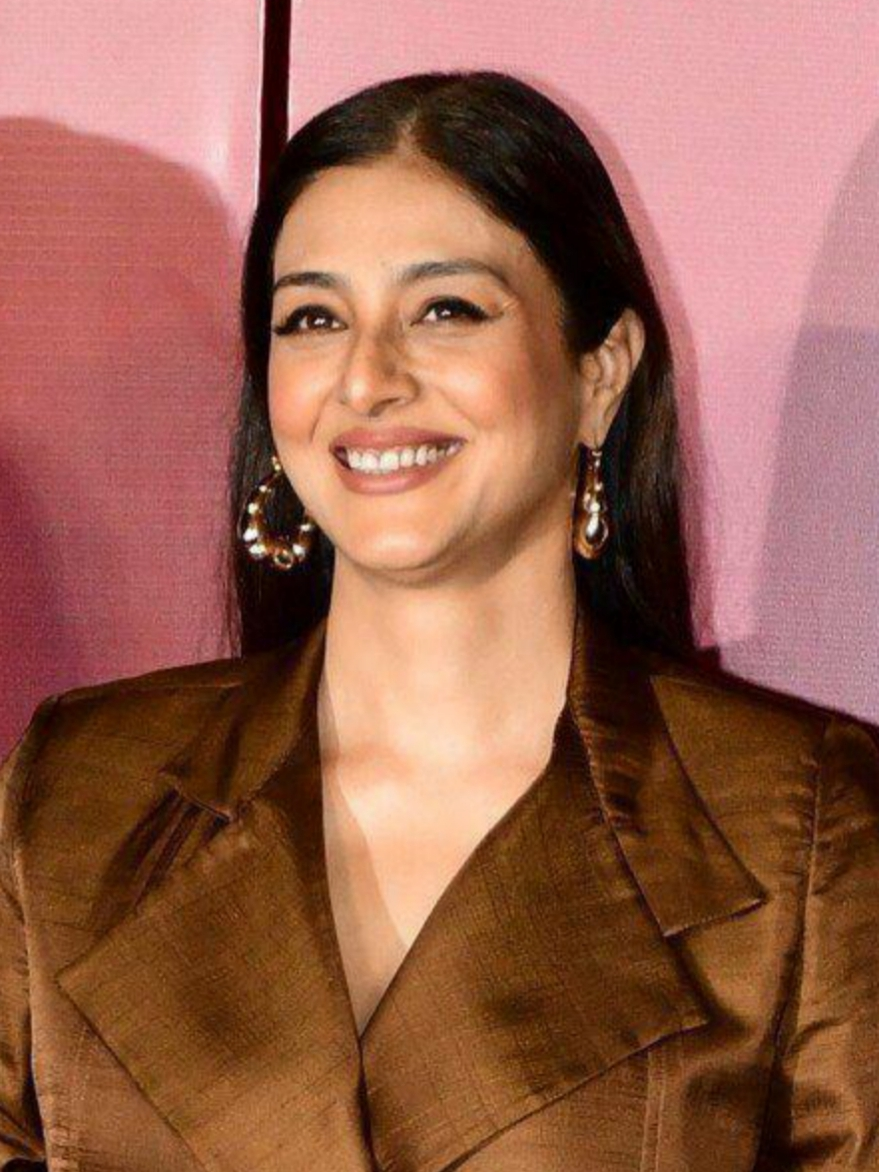
1990s: Tabu

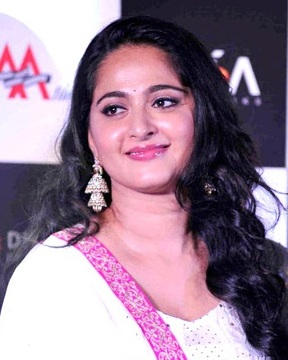
2000s: Anushka Shetty

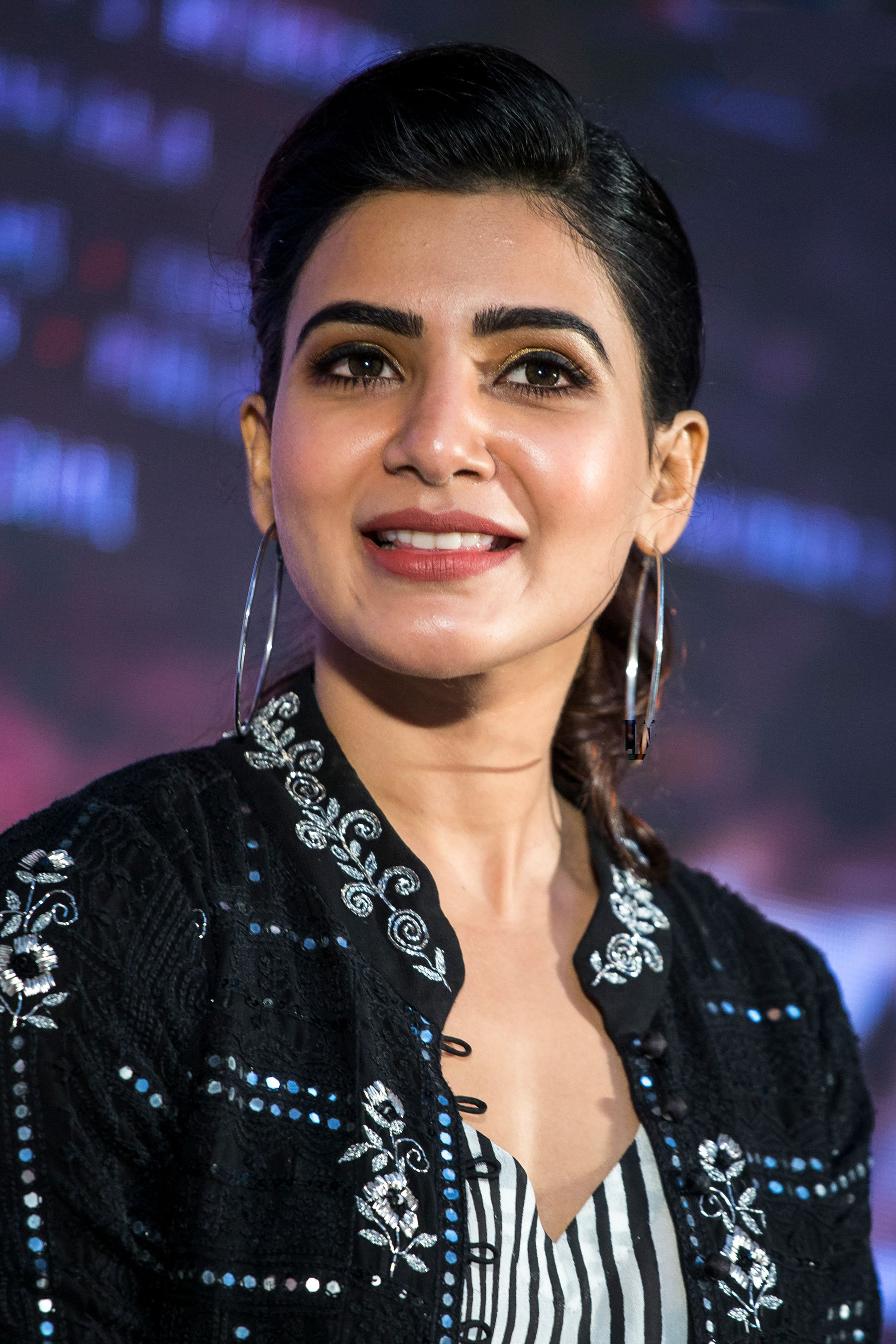
2010s: Samantha

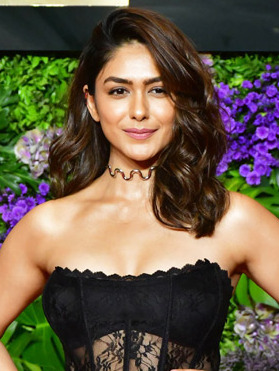
2020s: Mrunal Thakur

== 1930s ==
Year	Name	Debut film	Notable films
1935	Kanchanamala	Srikrishna Thulabhaaram	Veera Abhimanyu (1936), Gruhalakshmi (1938), Mala Pilla (1938)
1939	P. Bhanumathi	Vara Vikrayam	Laila Majnu (1949), Palnati Yuddham (1966), Mangamma Gari Manavadu (1984)

== 1940s ==
Year	Name	Debut film	Notable films
1947	Anjali Devi	Gollabhama	Lava Kusa (1963), Palnati Yuddham (1966), Allauddin Adhbhuta Deepam (1957)

== 1950s ==
Year	Name	Debut film	Notable films
1950	Sowcar Janaki	Shavukaru	Kanyasulkam (1955)
1951	Savitri	Pathala Bhairavi	Devadasu (1953), Mayabazar (1957), Pooja (1975)
1952	T. R. Rajakumari	Naa Illu	
1953	Jamuna	Puttilu	
1955	Sarada	Kanyasulkam	Jeevitha Chakram (1971), Justice Chowdary (1982), Amma Rajinama (1991)
1957	Kanchana	Suvarna Sundari	
1957	Vijaya Nirmala	Panduranga Mahatyam	

== 1960s ==
Year	Name	Debut film	Notable films
1960	Geetanjali	Rani Ratnaprabha	
1962	Vanisri	Bhishma	Jeevana Tarangalu (1973)

== 1970s ==
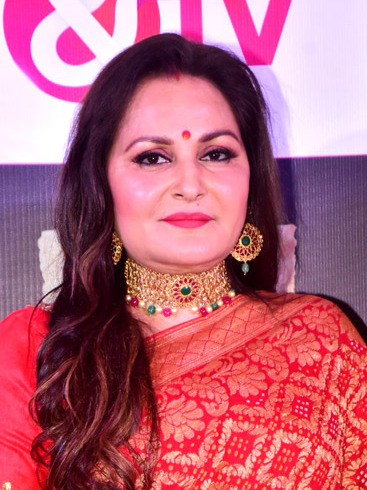
Jaya Prada

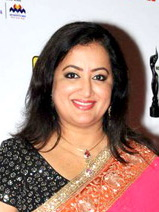
Sumalatha

Year	Name	Debut film	Notable films
1970	Sridevi	Maa Nanna Nirdoshi	Padaharella Vayasu (1978), Premabhishekam (1981), Jagadeka Veerudu Athiloka Sundari (1990)
1972	Jayasudha	Pandanti Kapuram	Tandra Paparayudu (1986)
1974	Jaya Prada	Bhoomi Kosam	Yamagola (1977)
1974	Rohini	Harathi	Maga Maharaju (1983), Devanthakudu (1984), Stri (1995)
1978	Sumalatha	Karunamayudu	Justice Chakravarthy (1984), Janani Janmabhoomi (1984), Agni Gundam (1984)

== 1980s ==
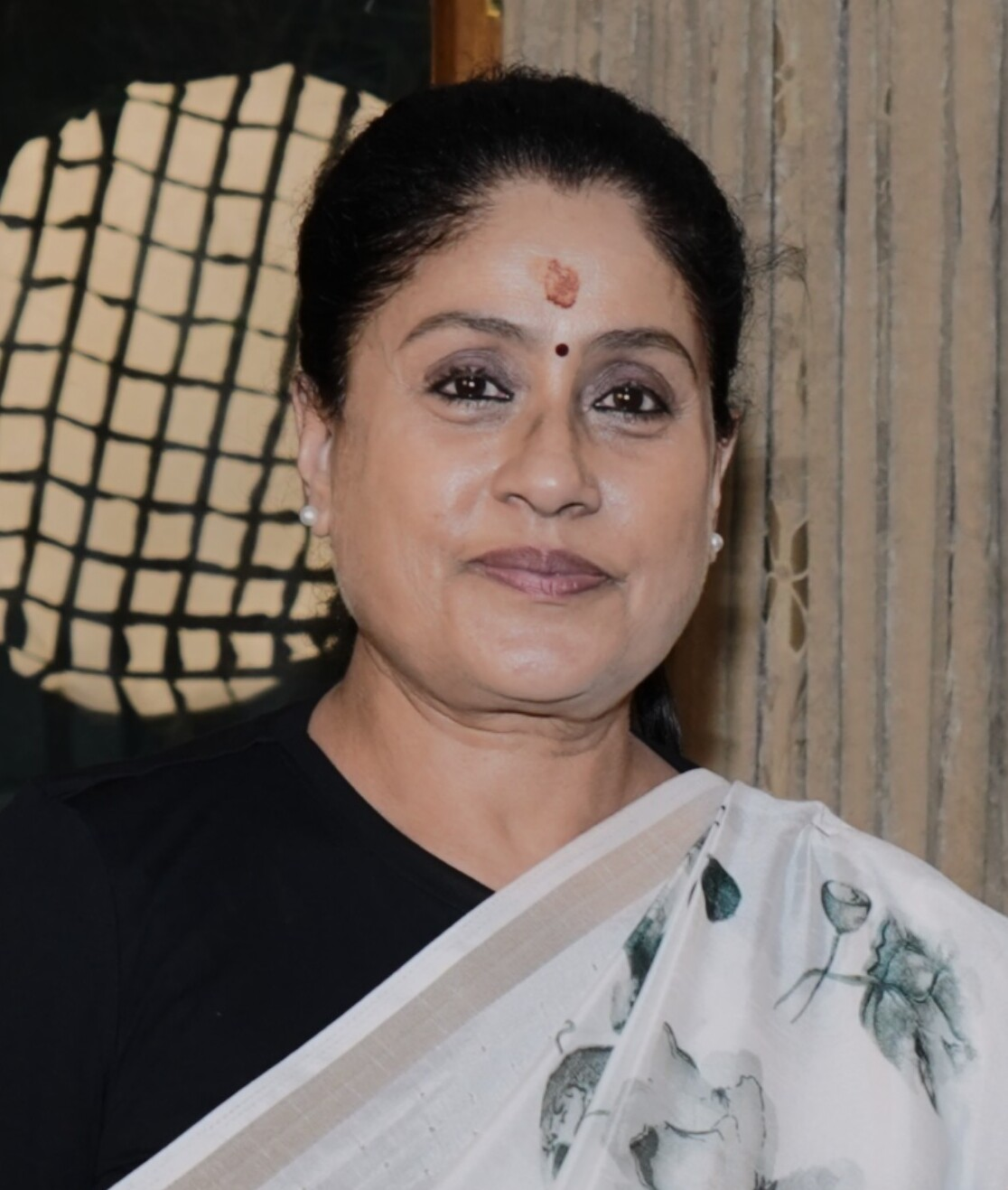
Vijayashanti

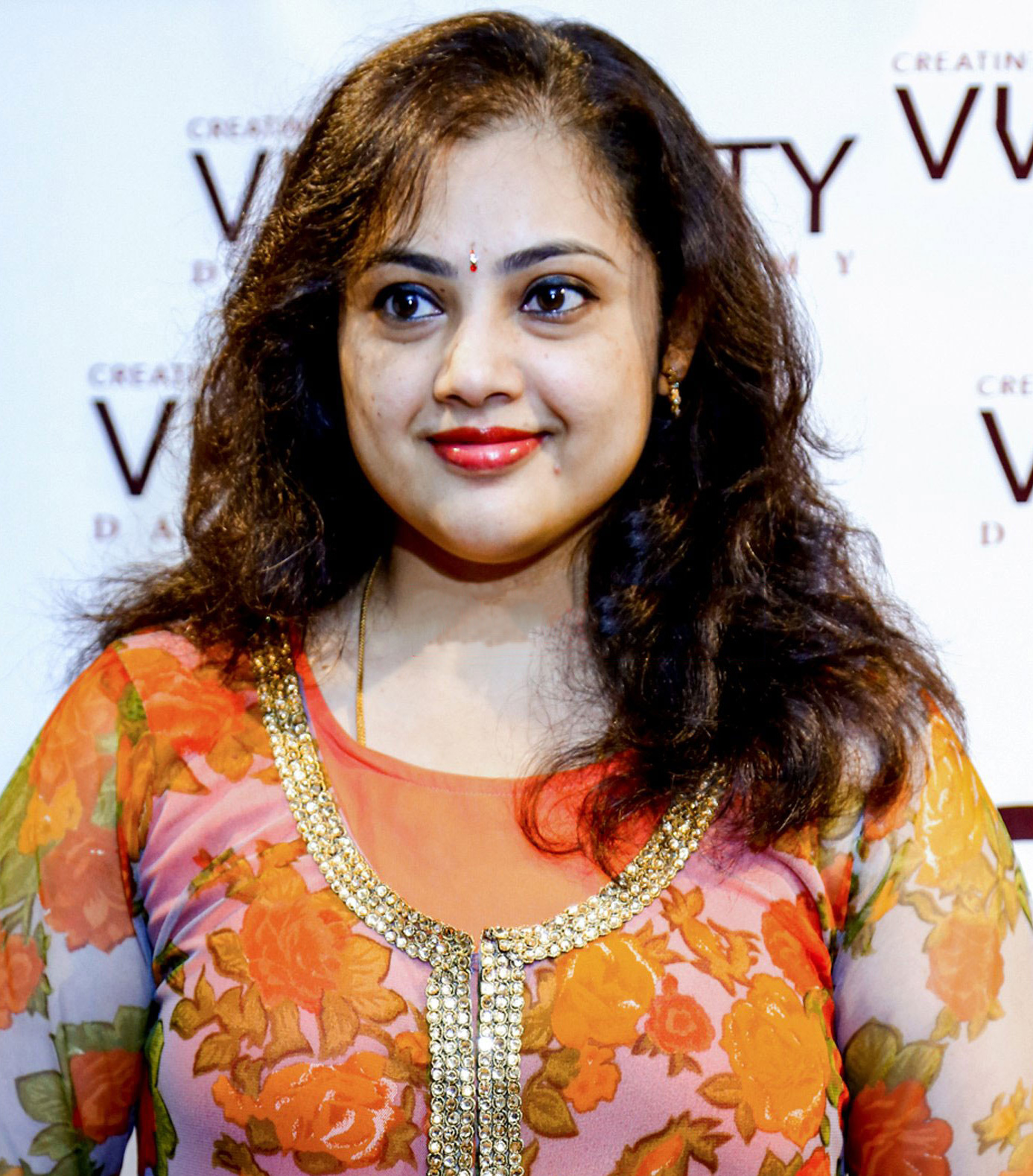
Meena

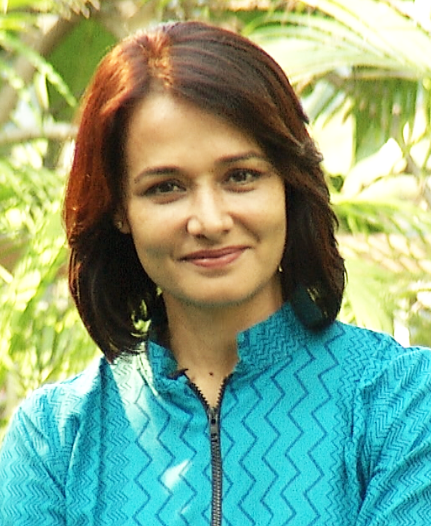
Amala Akkineni

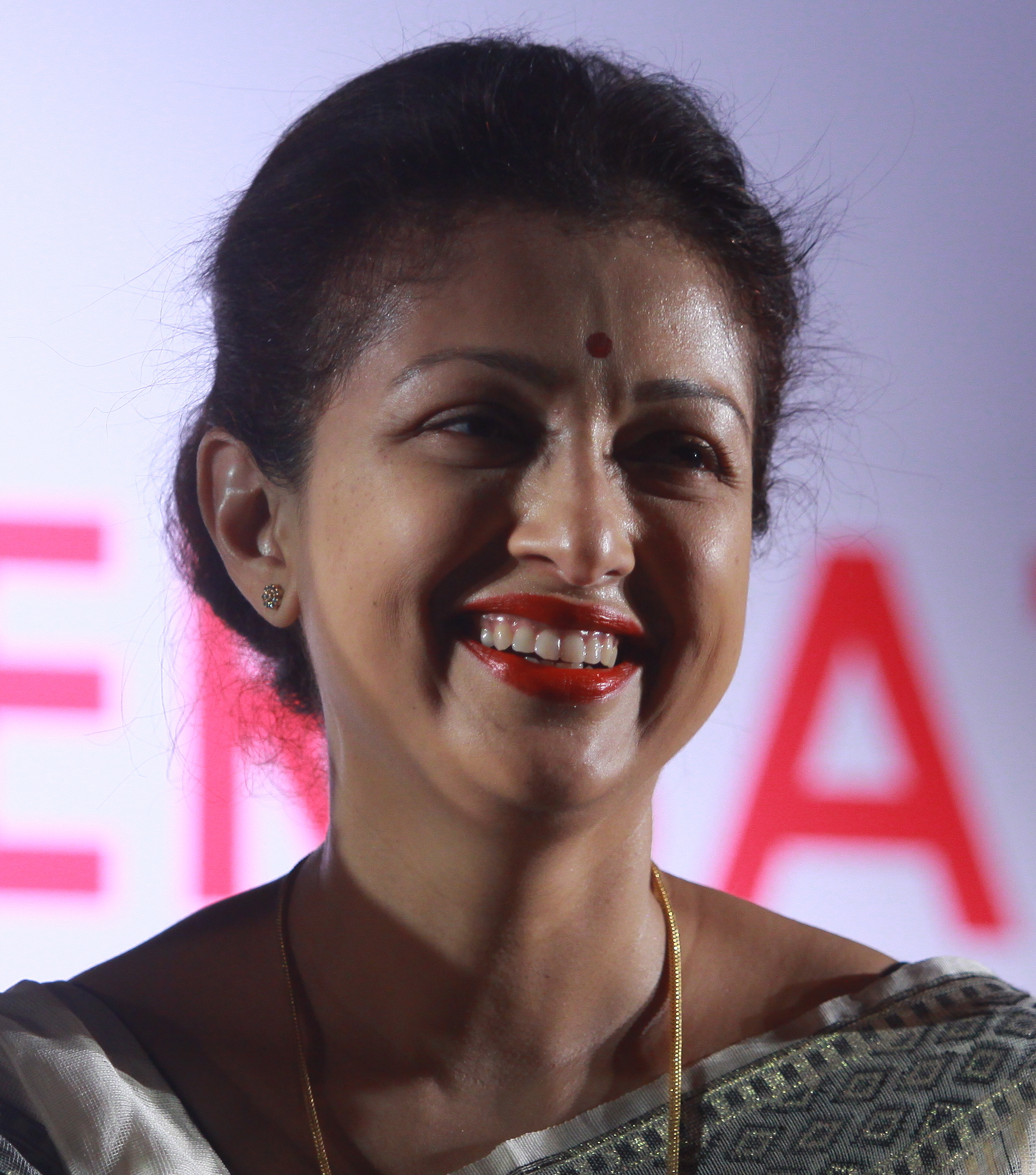
Gautami

Year	Name	Debut film	Notable films
1980	Vijayashanti	Khiladi Krishnudu	Sangharshana (1983), Kondaveeti Raja (1986), Karthavyam (1990)
1981	Silk Smitha	Seethakoka Chilaka	Khaidi (1983), Agni (1989), Aditya 369 (1991)
1982	Radha	Prema Moortulu	Simhasanam (1986), Yamudiki Mogudu (1988)
1983	Meena	Siripuram Monagadu	Muta Mestri (1993), Muddula Mogudu (1997), Drushyam (2014)
1984	Ramya Krishna	Kanchu Kagada	Allari Priyudu (1993), Gharana Bullodu (1995), Annamayya (1997)
1984	Bhanupriya	Sitara	Anveshana (1985), Swarnakamalam (1988), Gudachari 117 (1989)
1987	Amala Akkineni	Kirayi Dada	Raja Vikramarka (1990)
1987	Gautami	Dayamayudu	Srinivasa Kalyanam (1987), Chakravyuham (1992), Manamantha (2016)
1987	Shantipriya	Kaboye Alludu	Maharshi (1987), Agni (1989), Simha Swapnam (1989)
1988	Vani Viswanath	Chinni Krishnudu	Simha Swapnam (1989), Prema Yuddham (1990), Gharana Mogudu (1992)
1989	Rupini	Ontari Poratam	Gandeevam (1994)
1989	Nirosha	Muddula Mavayya	Nari Nari Naduma Murari (1990), Stuartpuram Police Station (1991), One by Two (1993)

== 1990s ==
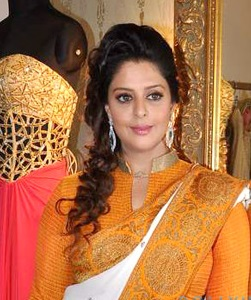
Nagma

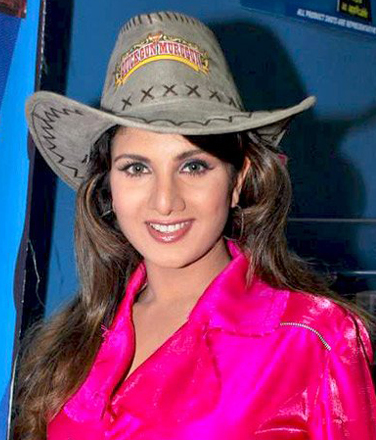
Rambha

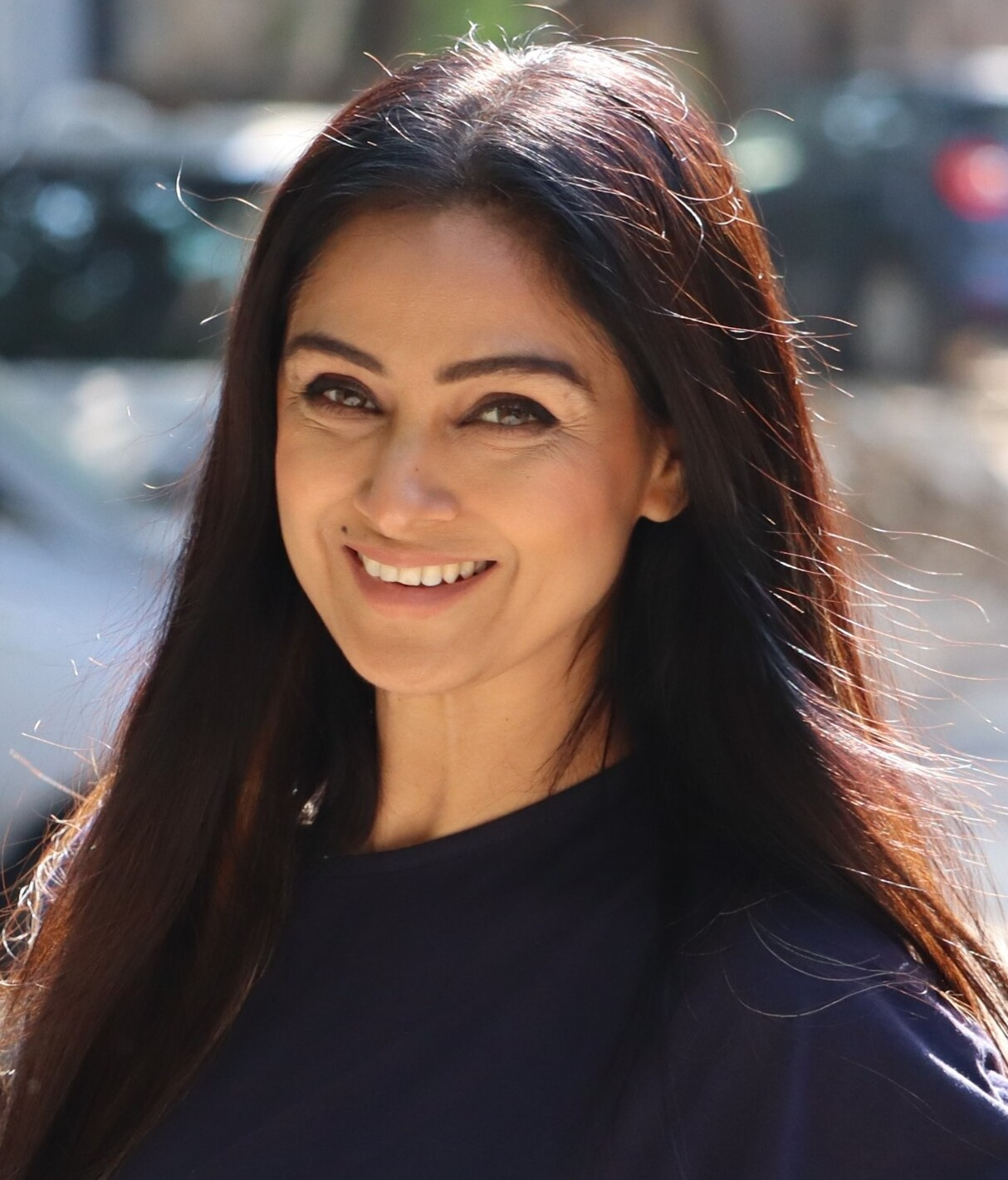
Simran

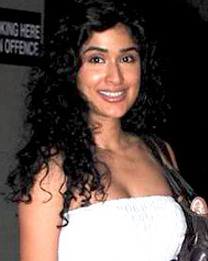
Anjala Zaveri

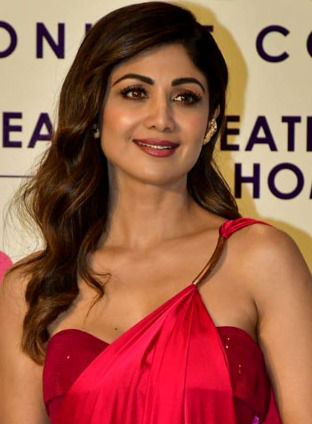
Shilpa Shetty

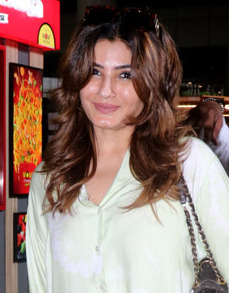
Raveena Tandon

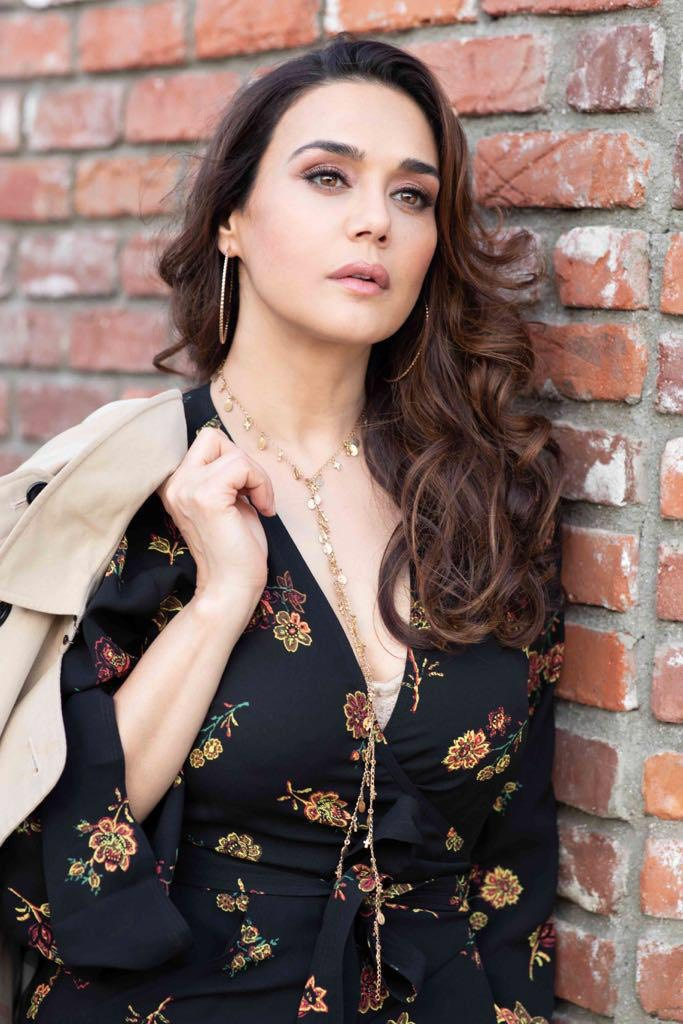
Preity Zinta

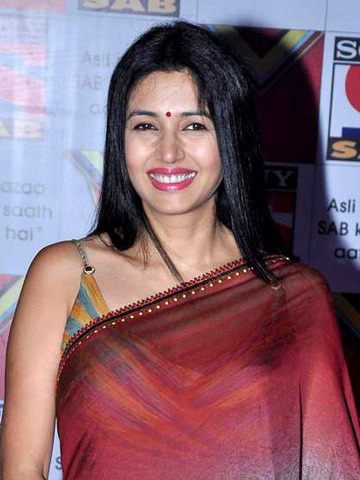
Deepti Bhatnagar

Year	Name	Debut film	Notable films
1990	Divya Bharti	Bobbili Raja	Assembly Rowdy (1991), Rowdy Alludu (1991), Tholi Muddhu (1993)
1991	Nagma	Peddintalludu	Gharana Mogudu (1992), Allari Alludu (1993), Mugguru Monagallu (1994)
1991	Tabu	Coolie No. 1	Sisindri (1995), Ninne Pelladata (1996), Chennakesava Reddy (2002)
1991	Roja	Prema Thapassu	Muta Mestri (1993), Bhairava Dweepam (1994), Subhalagnam (1994)
1992	Rambha	Aa Okkati Adakku	Rowdy Annayya (1993), Hitler (1997), Choosoddaam Randi (2000)
1992	Laya	Bhadram Koduko	Swayamvaram (1999), Kodanda Ramudu (2000), Naalo Unna Prema (2001)
1993	Aamani	Jamba Lakidi Pamba	Mister Pellam (1993), Subha Lagnam (1994), Subha Sankalpam (1995)
1993	Soundarya	Manavarali Pelli	Hello Brother (1994), Intlo Illalu Vantintlo Priyuralu (1996), Raja (1999)
1993	Raveena Tandon	Ratha Saradhi	Bangaru Bullodu (1993), Akasa Veedhilo (2001), Pandavulu Pandavulu Tummeda (2014)
1993	Sakshi Shivanand	Anna Vadina	Master (1997), Seetharama Raju (1999), Yuvaraju (2000)
1993	Sanghavi	Kokkoroko	Sarada Bullodu (1996), Suryavamsam (1998), Sandade Sandadi (2002)
1996	Shilpa Shetty	Sahasa Veerudu Sagara Kanya	Veedevadandi Babu (1997), Azad (2000), Bhalevadivi Basu (2001)
1996	Deepti Bhatnagar	Pelli Sandadi	Auto Driver (1998), Maa Annayya (2000), Kondaveeti Simhasanam (2002)
1997	Simran	Abbai Gari Pelli	Kalisundam Raa (2000), Nuvvu Vastavani (2000), Narasimha Naidu (2001)
1997	Anjala Zaveri	Preminchukundam Raa	Samarasimha Reddy (1999), Devi Putrudu (2001), Life Is Beautiful (2012)
1997	Sangeetha Krish	Circus Sattipandu	Khadgam (2002), Sankranti (2004), Sarileru Neekevvaru (2020)
1998	Isha Koppikar	Chandralekha	
1998	Preity Zinta	Premante Idera	Rajakumarudu (1999)
1999	Preeti Jhangiani	Thammudu	Narasimha Naidu (2001), Adhipathi (2001), Yamadonga (2007)

== 2000s ==
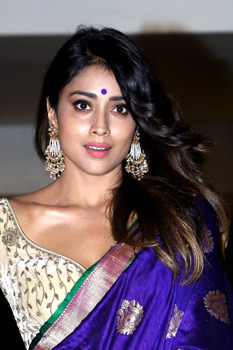
Shriya Saran

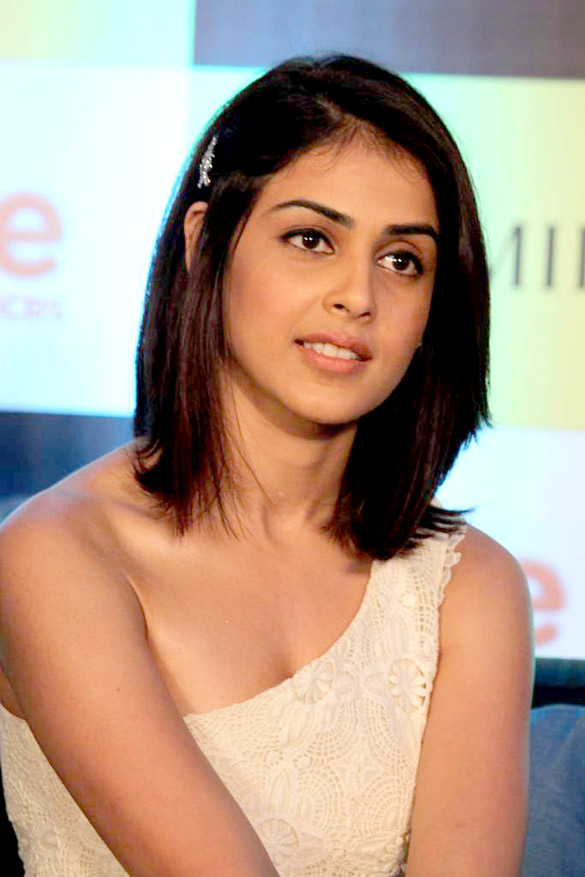
Genelia D'Souza

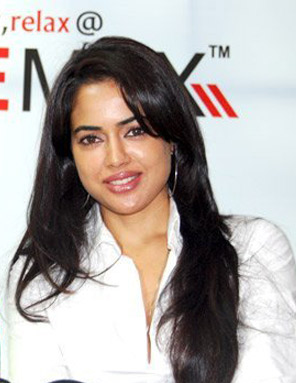
Sameera Reddy

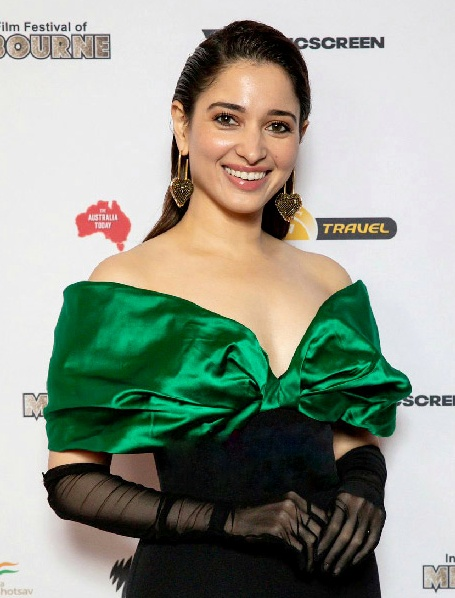
Tamannaah Bhatia

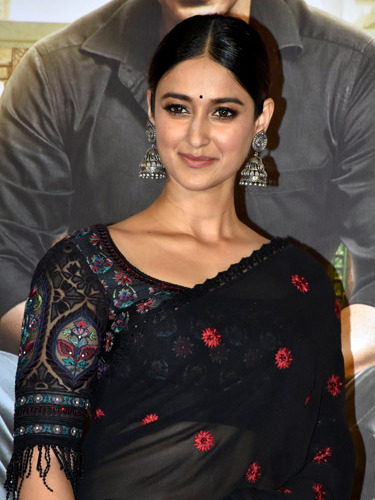
Ileana D'Cruz

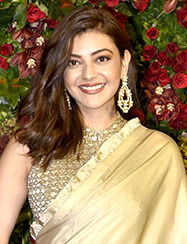
Kajal Aggarwal

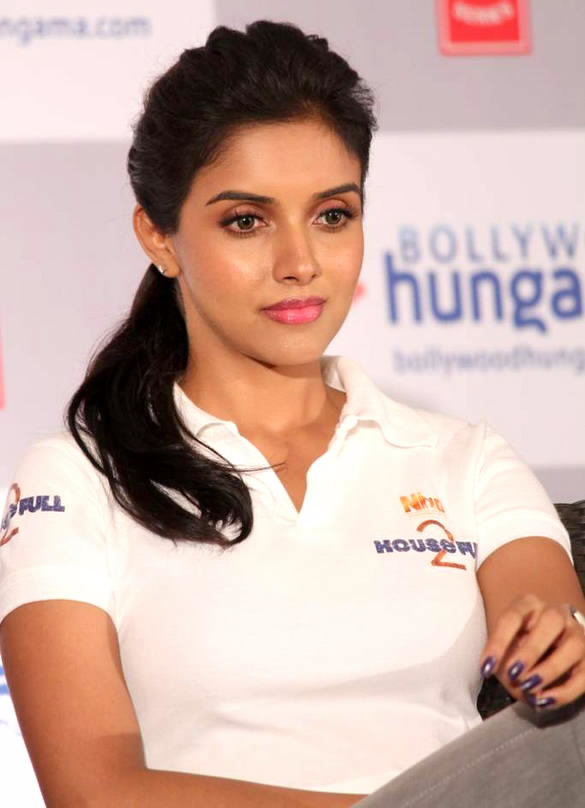
Asin

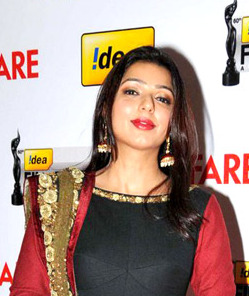
Bhumika Chawla

Year	Name	Debut film	Notable films
2000	Bhumika Chawla	Yuvakudu	Kushi (2001), Okkadu (2003), Missamma (2003)
2000	Reema Sen	Chitram	Adrustam (2002), Anji (2004), Bangaram (2006)
2000	Amisha Patel	Badri	Naani (2004), Narasimhudu (2005), Parama Veera Chakra (2011)
2001	Shriya Saran	Ishtam	Santosham (2002), Chatrapathi (2005), RRR (2022)
2001	Sonali Bendre	Murari	Indra (2002), Manmadhudu (2002), Shankar Dada M.B.B.S. (2004)
2001	Aarthi Agarwal	Nuvvu Naaku Nachav	Indra (2002), Vasantam (2003), Veede (2003)
2001	Sneha	Priyamaina Neeku	Hanuman Junction (2001), Sankranti (2005), Sri Ramadasu (2006)
2001	Anita Hassanandani	Nuvvu Nenu	Sreeram (2002), Thotti Gang (2002), Nenu Pelliki Ready (2003)
2001	Gajala	Naalo Unna Prema	Student No: 1 (2001), Kalusukovalani (2002), Malliswari (2004)
2002	Nikita Thukral	Hai	Kalyana Ramudu (2003), Sambaram (2003), Kushi Kushiga(2004)
2002	Charmy Kaur	Nee Thodu Kavali	Mantra (2007), Manorama (2009), Kavya's Diary (2009)
2002	Sadha	Jayam	Avunanna Kadanna (2005), Veerabhadra (2006), Classmates (2007)
2002	Rakshita	Idiot	Sivamani (2003), Andhrawala (2004), Andarivaadu (2005)
2003	Jyothika	Tagore	Mass (2004), Shock (2006), Vikramarkudu (2006)
2003	Asin	Amma Nanna O Tamila Ammayi	Sivamani (2003), Gharshana (2004), Chakram (2005)
2003	Genelia D'Souza	Satyam	Bommarillu (2006), Dhee (2007), Ready (2008)
2003	Trisha krishnan	Nee Manasu Naaku Telusu	Varsham (2004), Athadu (2005), Aadavari Matalaku Arthlale Verule (2007)
2003	Priyamani	Evare Athagadu	Yamadonga (2007), Golimaar (2010), Narappa (2021)
2004	Meera Jasmine	Ammayi Bagundi	Gudumba Shankar (2004), Yamagola Malli Modalayindi (2007), Gorintaku (2008)
2004	Kamalinee Mukherjee	Anand	Godavari (2006), Shirdi Sai (2012), Govindudu Andarivadele (2014)
2005	Anushka Shetty	Super	Chintakayala Ravi (2008), Mirchi (2013), Baahubali 2: The Conclusion (2017)
2005	Tamannaah Bhatia	Sree	Happy Days (2007), 100% Love (2011), Baahubali: The Beginning (2015)
2005	Swathi Reddy	Danger	Ashta Chamma (2008), Swamy Ra Ra (2013), Month of Madhu (2023)
2005	Poonam Bajwa	Modati Cinema	Boss (2006 film) (2006), Parugu (2008), NTR: Kathanayakudu (2019)
2005	Madhu Shalini	Andarivaadu	Oka V Chitram (2006), State Rowdy (2007), Karalu Miriyalu (2011)
2005	Raai Laxmi	Kanchanamala Cable TV	Adhinayakudu (2012), Balupu (2013), Where Is the Venkatalakshmi (2019)
2005	Kamna Jethmalani	Premikulu	Ranam (2006), Bendu Apparao R.M.P (2009), Kathi Kantha Rao (2010)
2005	Sanjjanaa Galrani	Soggadu	Bujjigadu (2008), Yamaho Yama (2012), Sardaar Gabbar Singh (2016)
2005	Sameera Reddy	Narasimhudu	Jai Chiranjeeva (2005), Ashok (2006), Krishnam Vande Jagadgurum (2012)
2006	Ileana D'Cruz	Devadasu	Pokiri (2006), Jalsa (2008), Julayi (2012)
2006	Nayanthara	Lakshmi	Yogi (2007), Adhurs (2010), Simha (2010)
2006	Anjali	Photo	Seethamma Vakitlo Sirimalle Chettu (2013), Balupu (2013), Geethanjali (2014)
2007	Kajal Aggarwal	Lakshmi Kalyanam	Magadheera (2009), Darling (2010), Brindavanam (2010)
2007	Hansika Motwani	Desamuduru	Kandireega (2011), Denikaina Ready (2012), Goutham Nanda (2017)
2007	Sonia Deepti	Happy Days	Vinayakudu (2008), Brahmalokam To Yamalokam Via Bhulokam (2010), Dookudu (2011)
2007	Vedhika	Vijayadasami	Ruler (2019), Bangarraju (2022), Razakar (2024)
2007	Shamna Kasim	Sri Mahalakshmi	Seema Tapakai (2011), Avunu (2012), Raju Gari Gadhi (2015)
2008	Sonal Chauhan	Rainbow	Legend (2014), Pandaga Chesko (2014), F3: Fun and Frustration (2022)
2008	Shraddha Das	Siddu from Sikakulam	Adhineta (2009), Arya 2 (2009), Nagavalli (2010)
2008	Bindu Madhavi	Avakai Biryani	Bumper Offer (2009), Rama Rama Krishna Krishna (2010), Pilla Zamindar (2011),
2009	Nyrraa M Banerji	Aa Okkadu	Saradaga Kasepu (2010), Kotha Janta (2014), Temper (2015)

== 2010s ==
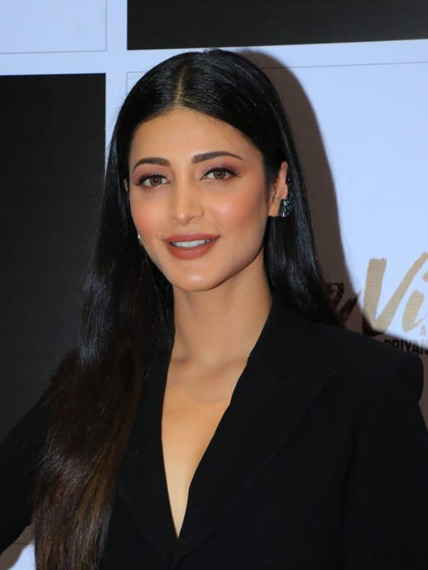
Shruti Haasan

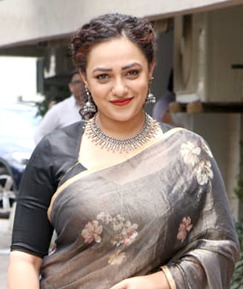
Nithya Menen

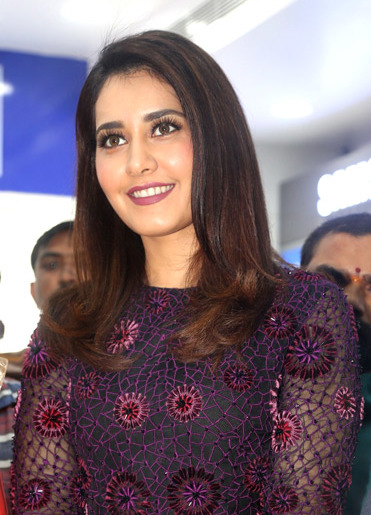
Raashii Khanna

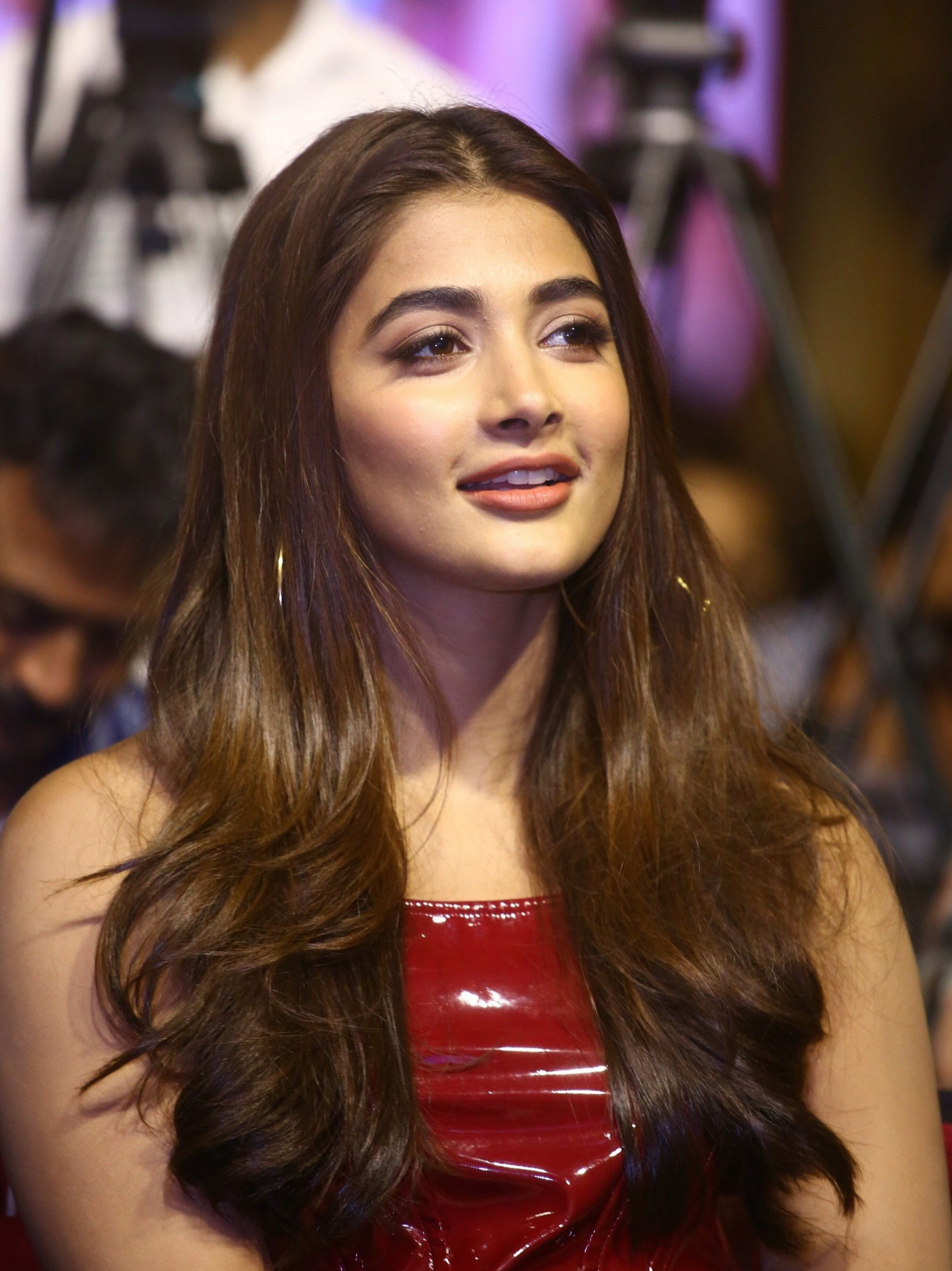
Pooja Hegde

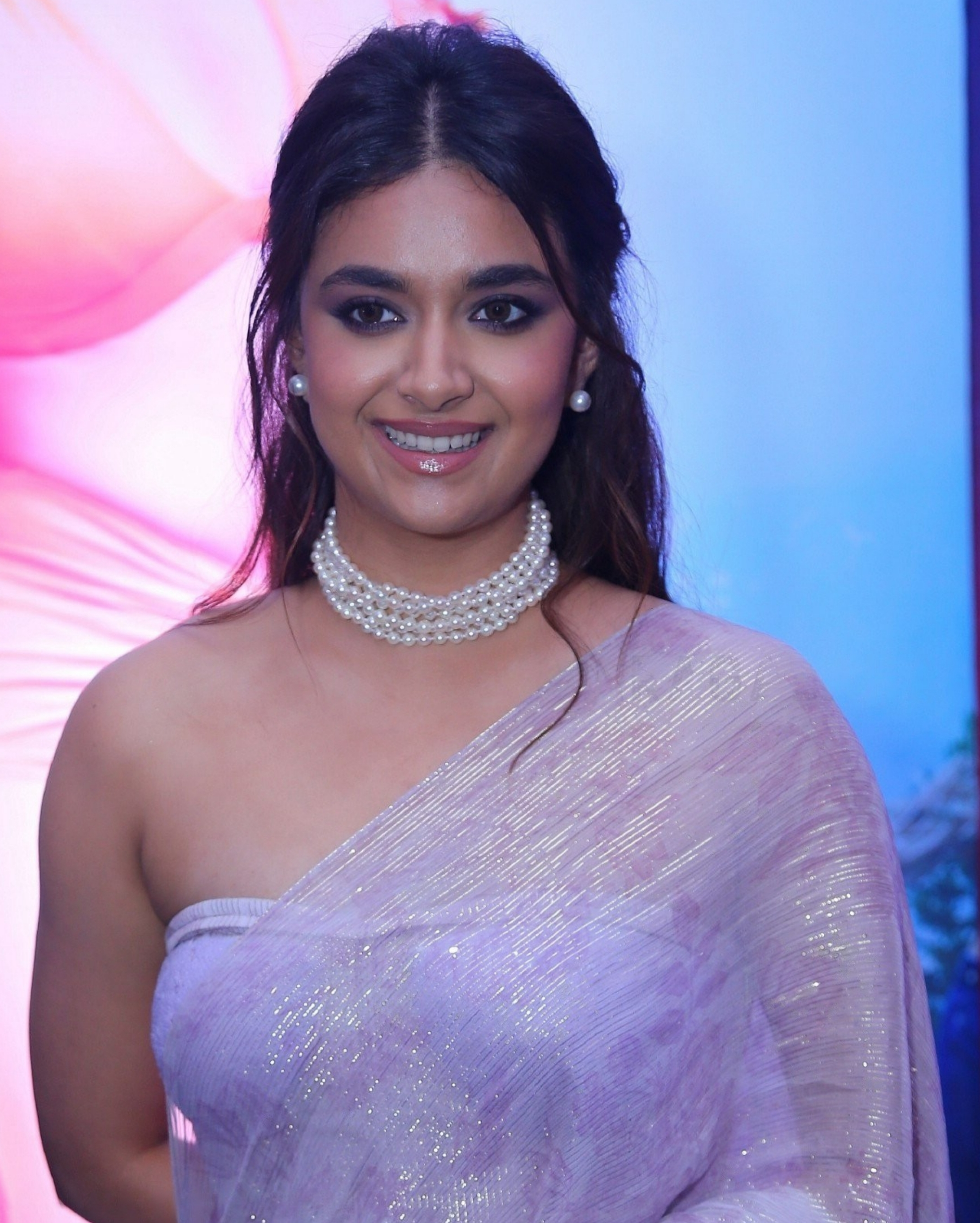
Keerthy Suresh

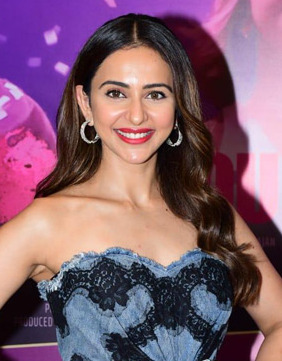
Rakul Preet Singh

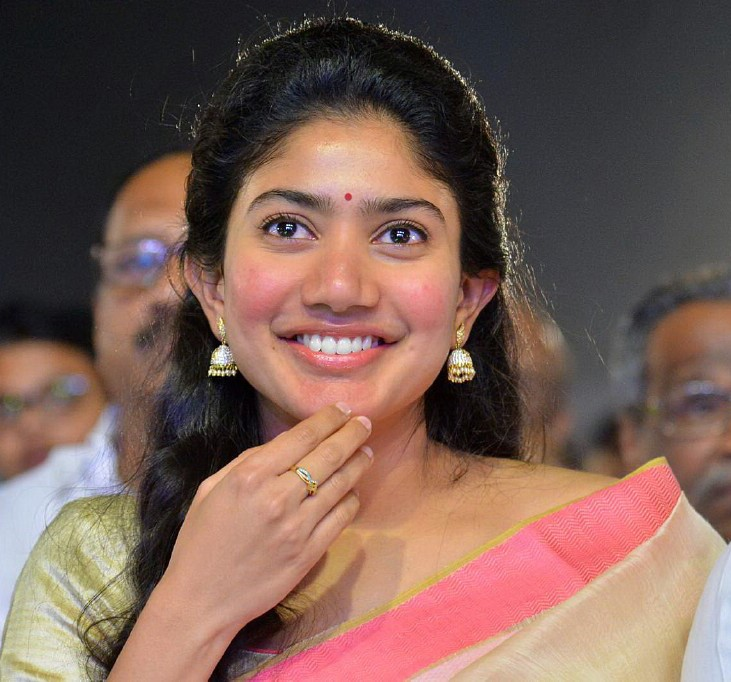
Sai Pallavi

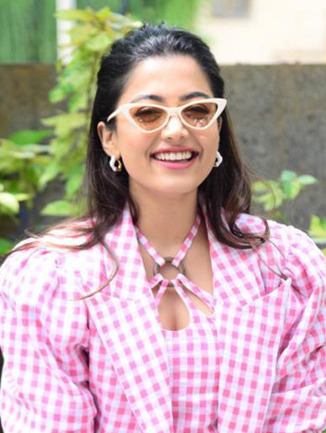
Rashmika Mandanna

Year	Name	Debut film	Notable films
2010	Samantha Ruth Prabhu	Ye Maaya Chesave	Dookudu (2011), Rangasthalam (2018), Oh! Baby (2019)
2010	Rakul Preet Singh	Keratam	Venkatadri Express (2013), Nannaku Prematho (2016), Sarrainodu (2016)
2010	Taapsee Pannu	Jhummandi Naadam	Mr. Perfect (2011), Gundello Godari (2013), Mishan Impossible (2022)
2010	Pranitha Subhash	Em Pillo Em Pillado	Attarintiki Daredi (2013), Rabhasa (2014), Hello Guru Prema Kosame (2018)
2010	Radhika Apte	Rakta Charitra	
2011	Nithya Menen	Ala Modalaindi	
2011	Shruti Hassan	Anaganaga O Dheerudu	Race Gurram (2014), Srimanthudu (2015), Salaar: Part 1 – Ceasefire (2023)
2011	Amala Paul	Bejawada	
2011	Isha Chawla	Prema Kavali	
2012	Regina Cassandra	Siva Manasulo Sruthi	Subramanyam for Sale (2015), Awe (2018), Saakini Daakini (2022)
2012	Lavanya Tripathi	Andala Rakshasi	
2012	Eesha Rebba	Life Is Beautiful	
2012	Monal Gajjar	Sudigadu	
2012	Anandhi	Ee Rojullo	
2012	Chandini Chowdary	Life Is Beautiful	
2013	Catherine Tresa	Chammak Challo	Iddarammayilatho (2013), Goutham Nanda (2017), Bimbisara (2022)
2013	Chandini Tamilarasan	Kaalicharan	Kiraak (2014), Chitram Bhalare Vichitram (2016), Ram Asur (2021)
2013	Ritu Varma	Baadshah	
2013	Avika Gor	Uyyala Jampala	
2014	Kriti Sanon	1: Nenokkadine	Dohchay (2015), Adipurush (2023)
2014	Raashii Khanna	Manam	Oohalu Gusagusalade (2014), Bengal Tiger (2015), Venky Mama (2019)
2014	Pooja Hegde	Oka Laila Kosam	DJ: Duvvada Jagannadham (2017), Aravinda Sametha Veera Raghava (2018), Ala Vaikunthapurramuloo (2020)
2014	Hebah Patel	Ala Ela	Kumari 21F (2015), 24 Kisses (2018), Odela Railway Station (2022)
2014	Seerat Kapoor	Run Raja Run	
2014	Mishti Chakraborty	Chinnadana Nee Kosam	
2015	Pragya Jaiswal	Mirchi Lanti Kurradu	Kanche (2015), Jaya Janaki Nayaka (2017), Akhanda (2021)
2015	Pooja Jhaveri	Bham Bolenath	Dwaraka (film) (2017), Touch Chesi Chudu (2018), Bangaru Bullodu (2021)
2015	Malvika Nair	Yevade Subramanyam	Kalyana Vaibhogame (2016), Taxiwaala (2018), Phalana Abbayi Phalana Ammayi (2023)
2015	Tridha Choudhury	Surya vs Surya	Manasuku Nachindi (2018), Anukunnadi Okati Ayinadi Okati (2020)
2016	Anupama Parameswaran	A Aa	Hello Guru Prema Kosame (2018), Karthikeya 2 (2022), Tillu Square (2024)
2016	Nivetha Thomas	Gentleman	Ninnu Kori (2017), Ninnu Kori (2017), Brochevarevarura (2019)
2016	Anu Emmanuel	Majnu	Kittu Unnadu Jagratha (2017), Agnyaathavaasi (2018), Naa Peru Surya (2018)
2016	Riya Suman	Majnu	Paper Boy (2018), Top Gear (2022), #MenToo (2023)
2016	Keerthy Suresh	Nenu Sailaja	Mahanati (2018), Sarkaru Vaari Paata (2022), Dasara (2023)
2016	Chitra Shukla	Nenu Sailaja	Maa Abbayi (2017), Rangula Ratnam (2018), Pakka Commercial (2022)
2016	Nandita Swetha	Ekkadiki Pothavu Chinnavada	Bluff Master (2018), Kapatadhaari (2021), Akshara (2021)
2016	Mehreen Pirzada	Krishna Gaadi Veera Prema Gaadha	Mahanubhavudu (2017), Raja the Great (2017), F2: Fun and Frustration (2019)
2016	Pujita Ponnada	Oopiri	Darsakudu (2017), Odela Railway Station (2022), Jorugaa Husharugaa (2023)
2016	Komalee Prasad	Nenu Seetha Devi	Napoleon, Sebastian P.C. 524 (2022), HIT: The Second Case (2022)
2017	Sai Pallavi	Fidaa	Middle Class Abbayi (2017), Love Story (2021), Shyam Singha Roy (2021)
2017	Megha Akash	Lie	Chal Mohan Ranga (2018), Dear Megha (2021), Ravanasura (2023)
2017	Nivetha Pethuraj	Mental Madhilo	Ala Vaikunthapurramuloo (2020), Red (2021), Paagal (2021)
2017	Dimple Hayathi	Gulf	Eureka (2020), Khiladi (2022), Ramabanam (2023)
2017	Sreeleela	Chitrangada	Pelli SandaD (2021), Dhamaka (2022), Guntur Kaaram (2024)
2017	Rukshar Dhillon	Aakatayi	Krishnarjuna Yudham (2018), ABCD: American Born Confused Desi (2019),
2018	Nabha Natesh	Nannu Dochukunduvate	iSmart Shankar (2019), Alludu Adhurs (2021), Maestro (2021)
2018	Kiara Advani	Bharat Ane Nenu	Vinaya Vidheya Rama (2019), Game Changer (2024)
2018	Aditi Rao Hydari	Sammohanam	Antariksham 9000 KMPH (2018), V (2020), Maha Samudram (2021)
2018	Rashmika Mandanna	Chalo	Geetha Govindam (2018), Sarileru Neekevvaru (2020), Pushpa: The Rise (2021)
2018	Neha Shetty	Mehbooba	Gully Rowdy (2021), DJ Tillu (2022), Bedurulanka 2012 (2023)
2018	Payal Rajput	RX 100	RDX Love (2019), Disco Raja (2020), Anaganaga O Athidhi (2020)
2018	Ruhani Sharma	Chi La Sow	HIT: The First Case (2020), Dirty Hari (2020), Saindhav (2024)
2018	Priyanka Sharma	Tharuvatha Evaru	Savaari (2020), Bommala Koluvu (2022), Tantiram (2023)
2018	Priya Vadlamani	Premaku Raincheck	Husharu (2018), Mukhachitram (2022), Manu Charitra (2023)
2018	Nidhhi Agerwal	Savyasachi	Mr. Majnu (2019), iSmart Shankar (2019), Hero (2022)
2019	Ananya Nagalla	Mallesham	Play Back (2021), Vakeel Saab (2021), Anveshi (2023)
2019	Ammu Abhirami	Rakshasudu	FCUK: Father Chitti Umaa Kaarthik (2021), Narappa (2021), Ranasthali (2022)
2019	Shivathmika Rajashekar	Dorasaani	Panchathantram (2022), Ranga Maarthaanda (2023)
2019	Aishwarya Rajesh	Kousalya Krishnamurthy	World Famous Lover (2020), Tuck Jagadish (2021), Republic (2021)
2019	Priyanka Mohan	Nani's Gang Leader	Sreekaram (2021), They Call Him OG (2024), Saripodhaa Sanivaaram (2024)
2019	Shraddha Srinath	Jersey	Jersey (2019), Saindhav (2024), Daaku Maharaaj (2025)
2019	Mirnalini Ravi	Gaddalakonda Ganesh	Organic Mama Hybrid Alludu (2023), Mama Mascheendra (2023)

== 2020s ==
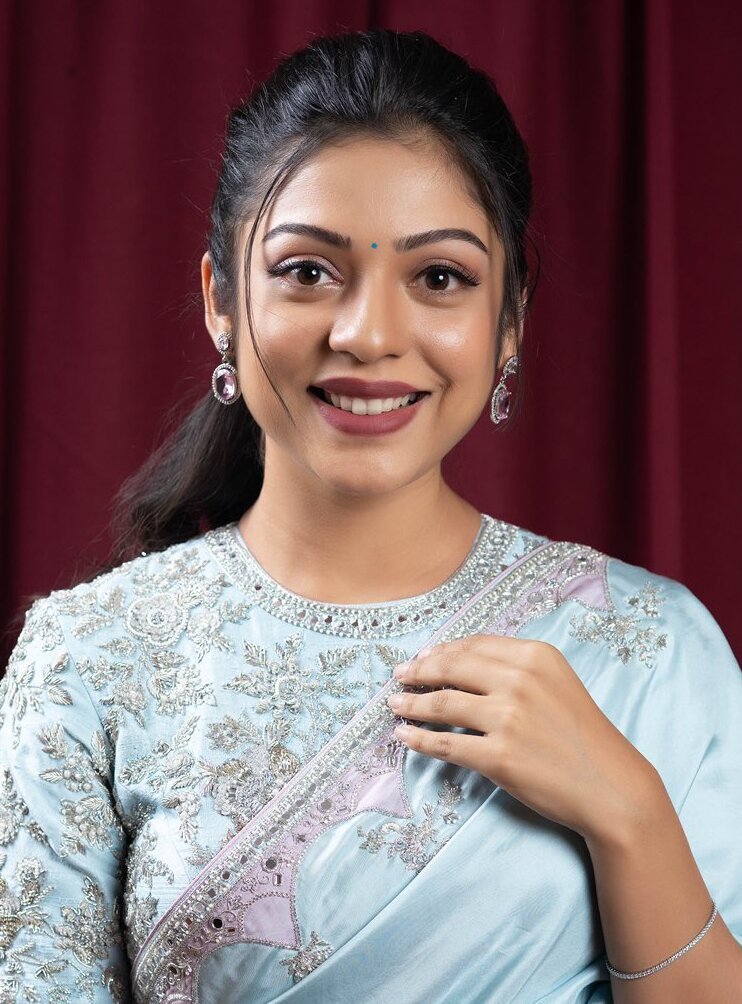
Varsha Bollamma

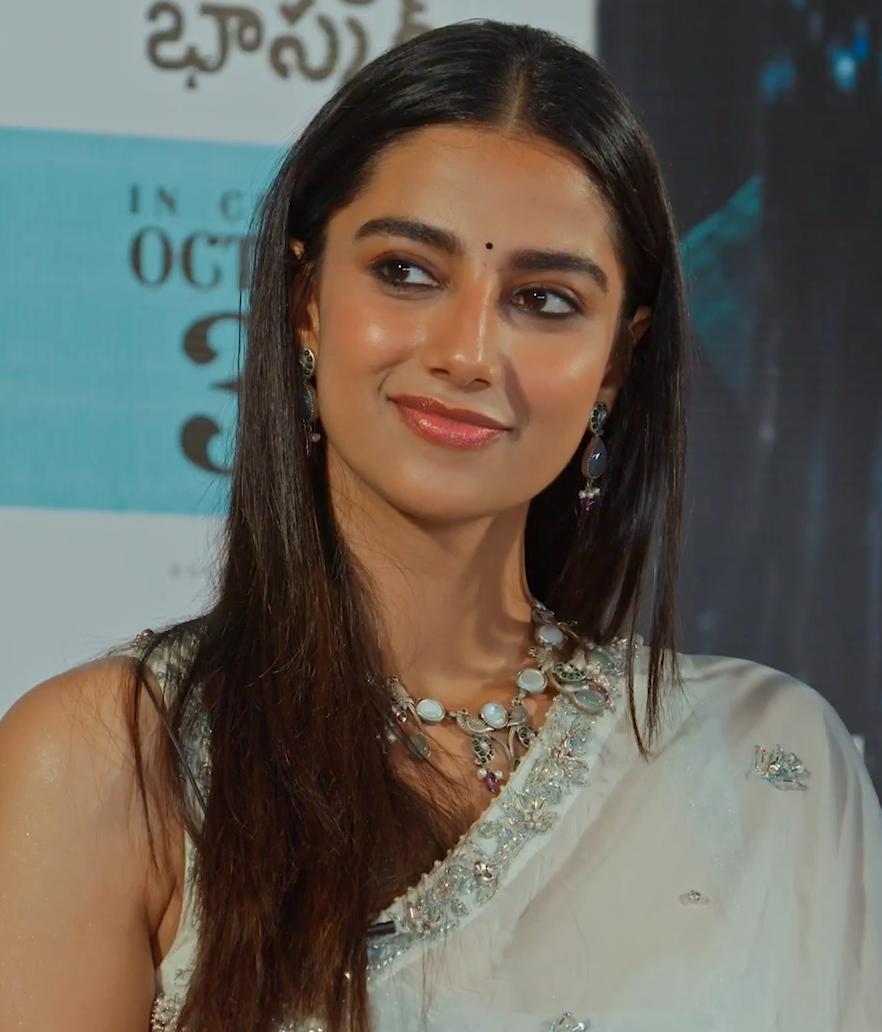
Meenakshi Chaudhary

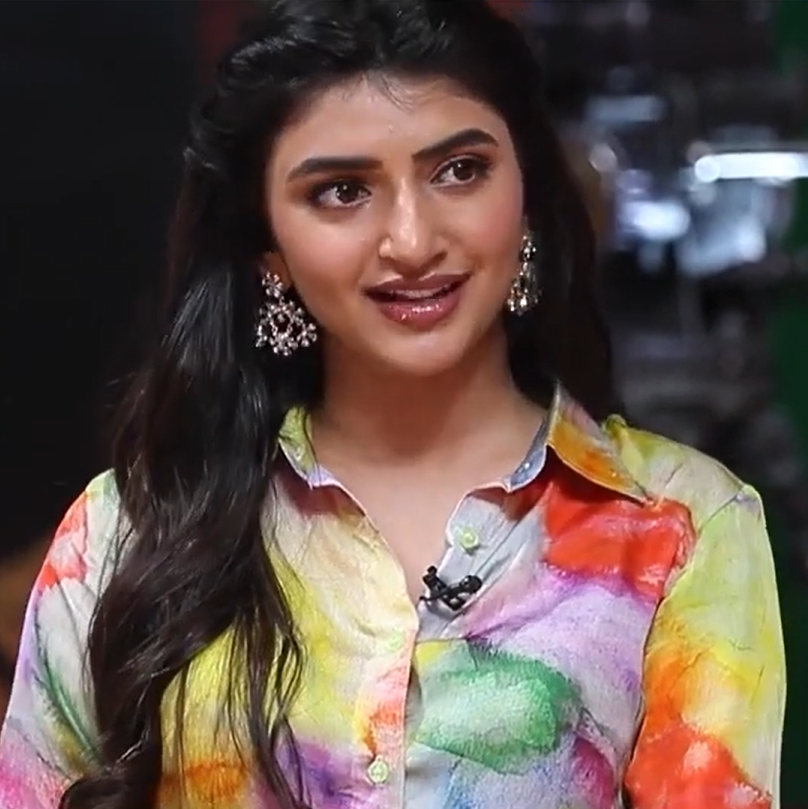
Sree Leela

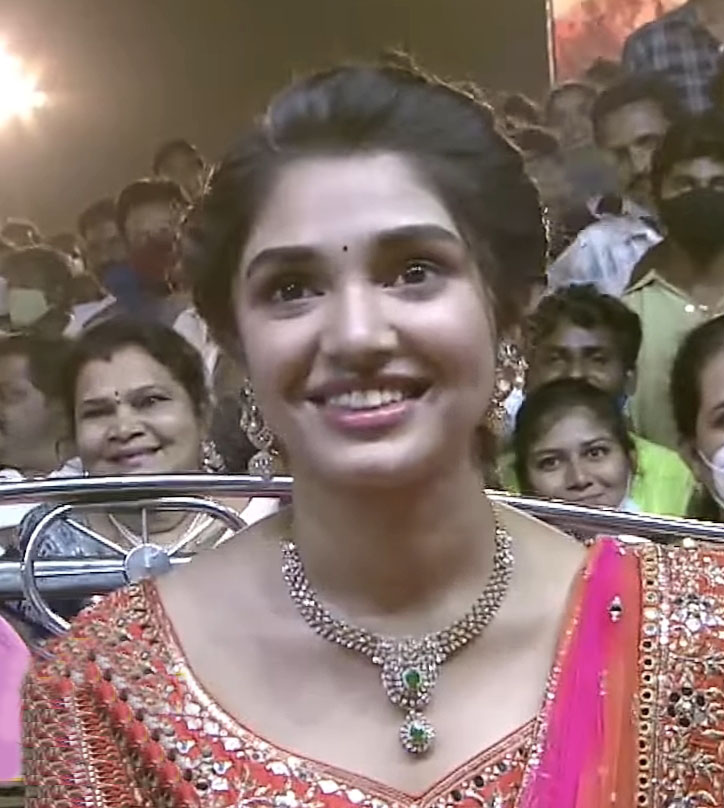
Krithi Shetty

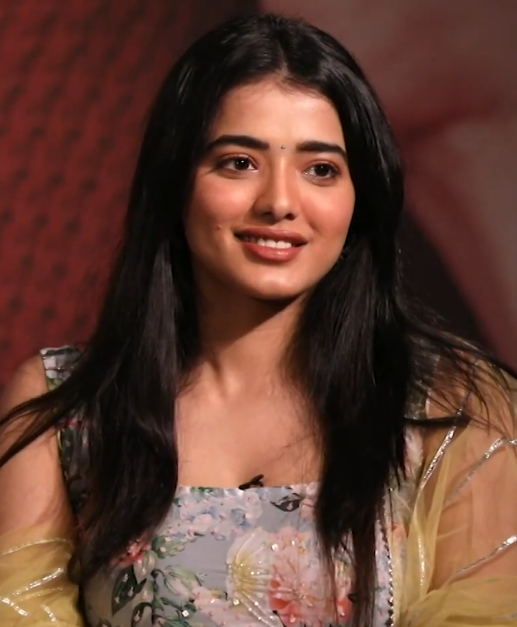
Ketika Sharma

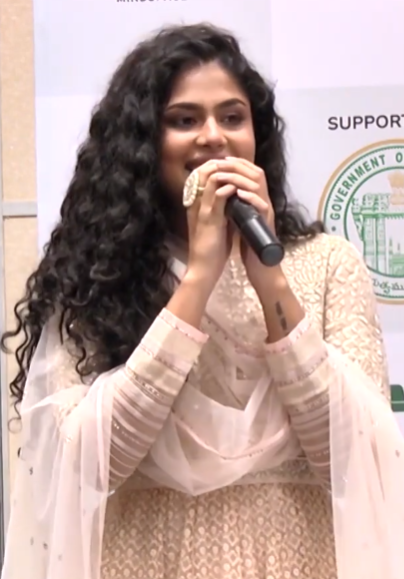
Faria Abdullah

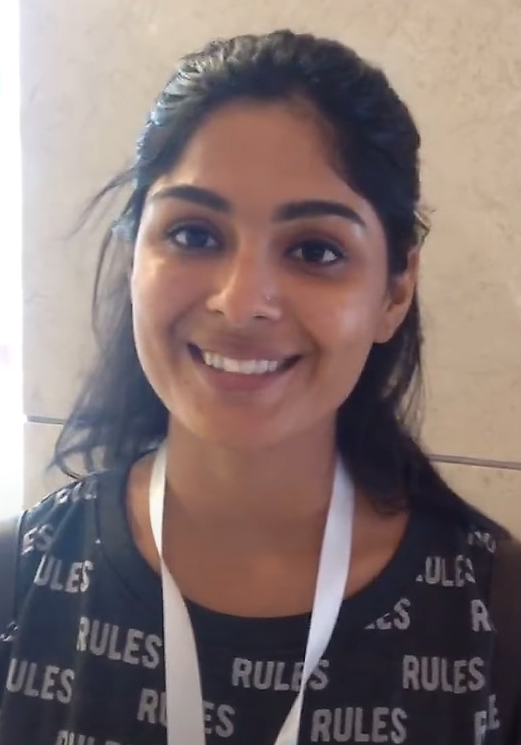
Samyuktha

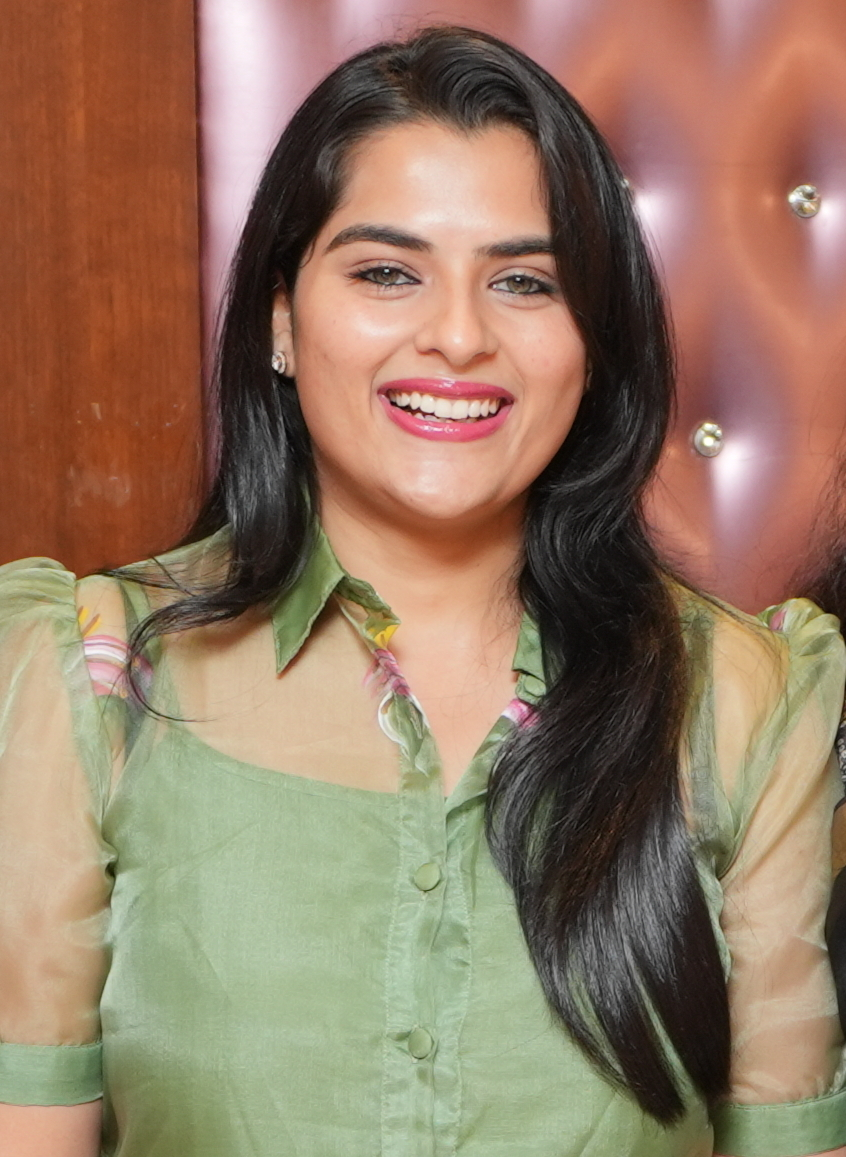
Kavya Kalyanram

Year	Name	Debut film	Notable films
2020	Varsha Bollamma	Choosi Choodangaane	Middle Class Melodies (2020), Swathi Muthyam (2022), Ooru Peru Bhairavakona (2024)
2021	Krithi Shetty	Uppena	Shyam Singha Roy (2021), Bangarraju (2022), Macherla Niyojakavargam (2022)
2021	Priya Prakash Varrier	Check	Ishq (2021), Bro (2023)
2021	Meenakshi Chaudhary	Ichata Vahanamulu Niluparadu	Khiladi (2022), HIT: The Second Case (2022), Guntur Kaaram (2024)
2021	Shivani Rajashekar	Pelli SandaD	Adbhutham (2021), WWW (2021), Kota Bommali PS (2023)
2021	Ketika Sharma	Romantic	Lakshya (2021), Ranga Ranga Vaibhavanga (2022), Bro (2023)
2021	Faria Abdullah	Jathi Ratnalu	Bangarraju (2022), Like, Share & Subscribe (2022), Aa Okkati Adakku (2024)
2021	Rashi Singh	Sashi	Prasanna Vadanam (2024), Paanch Minar (2025), Ramba Oorvasi Menaka (2026)
2022	Samyuktha	Bheemla Nayak	Bimbisara (2022), Sir (2023), Virupaksha (2023)
2022	Aishwarya Lekshmi	Godse	Ammu (2022), SYG - Sambarala Yeti Gattu (2025)
2022	Mrunal Thakur	Sita Ramam	Hi Nanna (2023), The Family Star (2024)
2022	Kavya Kalyanram	Masooda	Balagam (2023), Ustaad (2023)
2023	Vaishnavi Chaitanya	Baby	Love Me If You Dare (2024)
2023	Priya Bhavani Shankar	Kalyanam Kamaneeyam	Bhimaa (2024), Zebra (2024)
2023	Ashika Ranganath	Amigos	Naa Saami Ranga (2024), Vishwambhara (2025)
2024	Janhvi Kapoor	Devara: Part 1	Peddi (2026), Raaka (2027)
2025	Srinidhi Shetty	HIT: The Third Case	Telusu Kada (2025)

== Accolades ==
Actresses in the Telugu film industry have been recognized through various awards at the national, state and industry levels. These include the National Film Award for Best Actress in a Leading Role, Nandi Award for Best Actress, Filmfare Award for Best Actress – Telugu, SIIMA Award for Best Actress – Telugu and others.

== Other notable ==
Other notable actresses who have appeared in fewer than three Telugu films include Twinkle Khanna, Katrina Kaif, Priyanka Chopra Jonas, Alia Bhatt, Shraddha Kapoor, Deepika Padukone and Ananya Pandey but these weren't their debut roles. Disha Patani started her career with Loafer in 2015.

== See also ==
- Telugu cinema
- List of Indian film actresses
- List of Hindi film actresses
- List of Kannada film actresses
- List of Tamil film actresses
