= Jithender Reddy =

2024 Indian Telugu-language film by Virinchi Varma

- Theatrical release poster
- Directed by: Virinchi Varma
- Screenplay by: Virinchi Varma
- Story by: Muduganti Ravinder Reddy
- Produced by: Muduganti Ravinder Reddy
- Starring: Rakesh Varre; Vaishali Raj; Riya Suman; Subbaraju; Ravi Prakash
- Cinematography: Gnana Shekar V. S.
- Edited by: Raamakrishna Reddy Arram
- Music by: Gopi Sundar
- Production company: Muduganti Creations
- Release date: 8 November 2024
- Country: India
- Language: Telugu

Jithender Reddy is a 2024 Indian Telugu-language action drama film directed by Virinchi Varma. The film features Rakesh Varre, Vaishali Raj, Riya Suman, Subbaraju and Ravi Prakash in important roles.

The film was released on 8 November 2024.

== Cast ==
- Rakesh Varre as Jithender Reddy
  - Ruthvik Varma as young Jithender Reddy
- Vaishali Raj as Lawyer Sharada, Jithender's love-interest
- Riya Suman as Gayathri
- Subbaraju as Gopanna
- Ravi Prakash as Gunman Gattaiah, Gayathri's father
- Chatrapathi Sekhar as Naxalite Sai anna
- Kishore Kumar Polimera as Balaram
- Meka Ramakrishna as Jithender's father
- Bindu Chandramouli as Jithender's mother
- Rama Rao Jadhav
- Prem Sagar

== Music ==
The background score and soundtrack is composed by Gopi Sundar. The audio rights were acquired by Aditya Music.

All lyrics are written by Rambabu Gosala; all music is composed by Gopi Sundar.

Track list
No.	Title	Singer(s)	Length
1.	"A aa E ee U uu"	Rahul Sipligunj	5:17
2.	"Dheera Ra Ra"	Kaala Bhairava	4:52
3.	"Lachimakka"	Mangli	4:06
4.	"Ee Matti Bangaram"	Ritesh G Rao	5:53
5.	"Election Campaign"	Sai Charan Bhaskaruni	2:16

== Release ==
Jithender Reddy was originally scheduled to release on 3 May 2024, but was rescheduled and released on 8 November 2024.

== Reception ==
Sashidhar Adivi of Times Now gave the same rating echoing the same about the performance of Rakesh Varre. Aditya Devulapally of the Cinema Express gave a rating of 1 out of 5 and criticised the screenplay.
