= Veerta =

Veertaa
- Theatrical release poster
- Directed by: Shibu Mitra
- Screenplay by: Ajit Singh Deol; Ram Kelkar
- Dialogues by: Zaheer Ali
- Story by: Ajit Singh Deol
- Produced by: Sital Singh Johal; Ajit Singh Deol
- Starring: Sunny Deol; Jaya Prada; Prosenjit Chatterjee; Shantipriya; Neena Gupta; Prem Chopra
- Cinematography: Siba Mishra
- Edited by: Heera
- Music by: Bappi Lahiri
- Production company: Kuki Films International
- Release date: 1993
- Running time: 129 min
- Country: India
- Language: Hindi

Veertaa is a 1993 Indian film directed by Shibu Mitra. The movie stars Sunny Deol, Jaya Prada, Prosenjit Chatterjee, Shantipriya, Neena Gupta, Shakti Kapoor, Prem Chopra in pivotal roles.

== Plot ==
Balwant Rai (Pradeep Kumar) is a big industrialist. His daughter Uma (Neena Gupta) is married to Sunderlal's (Prem Chopra) elder son Raghuveer (Shakti Kapoor). Sunderlal is the managing director of the Rai Group of Industries. Balwant Rai's only son, Amar—nicknamed Munna loves his sister very much. Sunderlal is a greedy character whose intends to steal the property of Balwant Rai and kill Munna. He plots a conspiracy to finish off Munna. But a village boy, Mangal saves Munna's life. Now both are living together and Mangal's mother (Seema Deo) feels happy because they love her very much. However, some people recognise Munna and take him back again to his father. Balwant Rai realises that his son's life is in danger and sends Munna to a foreign country along with his trusted employee-friend, Laxman Chacha (Ram Mohan).

After many years, Sunderlal and Raghuveer become restless and desperate to kill Balwant Rai. They lock up Uma (Neena Gupta) in a cell. Now young Munna (Prosenjit Chatterjee) returns home and takes charge of the entire business. Sunderlal informs Munna that his sister Uma is very much ailing and has gone to U.S.A for treatment. Munna calls his childhood friend Mangal (Sunny Deol) and appoints him as the new managing director of his business. Here Mangal meets Shalu (Jaya Prada) who is the daughter of another industrialist, Jay Prakash (Satyen Kappu). In her childhood, Shalu's marriage was fixed with Munna. But now Shalu falls in love with Mangal and he too accepts her love. Munna does not mind it, because he himself is in love with a village girl Maina (Shantipriya) from his childhood days.

Sunderlal and Raghuveer plot many ideas to finish off Mangal and Munna. Once with the help of Munna's secretary Lili (Aruna Irani), they almost succeed in framing Mangal in a false rape and murder case. A misunderstanding thus develops between Mangal and Shalu, who even agrees to marry Sunderlal's younger son Ranveer (Tej Sapru). Finally Mangal and Munna succeed in identifying the real culprits.

== Cast ==
- Sunny Deol as Mangal Singh
- Jaya Prada as Shalu – Mangal's girlfriend
- Prosenjit Chatterjee as Amar Rai/Munna
- Shantipriya as Maina – Amar's girlfriend
- Neena Gupta as Uma – Amar's sister, Mangal's adoptive sister
- Prem Chopra as Sundarlal
- Shakti Kapoor as Raghuveer
- Seema Deo as Mangal's Mother
- Satyen Kappu as Shalu's father
- Pradeep Kumar as Balwant Rai – Amar's father
- Tej Sapru as Ranveer
- Aruna Irani as Lily
- Jagdish Raj
- Sudhir as Mill Manager Mehta
- Viju Khote as Kallu Dada
- Tiku Talsania
- Jagdarshan Samra as Mohan
- Asha Sharma as Shalu's Mother
- Ram Mohan
- Rajan Haskar
- Brahmachari as Sevakram
- Birbal
- Gurbachan Singh
- Master Harsh Vashisht as Young Mangal Singh

== Music and soundtrack ==
The music of the film was composed by Bappi Lahiri and the lyrics of the songs were penned by Ajit Singh Deol.

Song	Singer
"Badhai Ho"	Kavita Krishnamurthy, Alka Yagnik
"Kanna Vati"	Amit Kumar, Alka Yagnik
"Beli O Beli"	Debashish Dasgupta, Kumar Sanu
"O Judewali"	Asha Bhosle, Kumar Sanu
"Na Na Na Na"	Asha Bhosle, Kumar Sanu
"Sha Ra Ra Ra"	Asha Bhosle, Mangal Singh
