= Neram Nalla Irukku =

- Poster
- Directed by: Manoj Kumar
- Written by: Manoj Kumar
- Produced by: M. Nachiappan; P. S. Jayarama Iyer
- Starring: Ramarajan; Nishanti
- Cinematography: Ranga
- Edited by: R. Baskaran
- Music by: M. S. Viswanathan
- Production company: Srini Creations
- Release date: 21 October 1987
- Country: India
- Language: Tamil

Neram Nalla Irukku (transl. The timing is good) is a 1987 Indian Tamil-language film written and directed by Manoj Kumar. The film stars Ramarajan and Nishanti. It was released on 21 October 1987.

== Cast ==
- Ramarajan as Dr. Raja
- Nishanti as Jyothi
- Janagaraj
- Senthil
- Kodai Mazhai Vidya
- Deepa
- Krishnaraj
- Chinni Jayanth
- Vijay Krishnaraj
- Thyagu
- Master Karthik
- Baby Kavita Rani
- Gandhimathi
- Vellai Subbaiah
- Singamuthu

== Production ==
Singamuthu made his acting debut with this film.

== Soundtrack ==
The soundtrack was composed by M. S. Viswanathan.

Track listing
No.	Title	Lyrics	Singer(s)	Length
1.	"Naan Thaniyadicha"	Gangai Amaran	Malaysia Vasudevan
2.	"Sammatham Sammatham"	Pulamaipithan	K. J. Yesudas, K. S. Chithra
3.	"Keerai Keerai"	Gangai Amaran	S. Janaki
4.	"Yemma Yemma"	Gangai Amaran	S. P. Balasubrahmanyam, S. P. Sailaja
5.	"Unnaipol Manasu"	Gangai Amaran	Malaysia Vasudevan, K. S. Chitra

== Release and reception ==
Neram Nalla Irukku was released on 21 October 1987, during Diwali. Jayamanmadhan of Kalki appreciated the film's final hour, final suspense and Viswanathan's music but panned Janagaraj's acting, technical elements and felt the director gave up on the plot after midway.
