= Sigappu Thali =

1988 film by Ramamurthy Thyagarajan

- Theatrical release poster
- Directed by: R. Thyagarajan
- Story by: R. P. Viswam
- Produced by: T. Subbalakshmi
- Starring: Charan Raj; Ramki; Nishanthi; Saranya
- Cinematography: V. Ramamurthy
- Edited by: M. G. Balurao
- Music by: Shankar–Ganesh
- Production company: Lakshmiraja Films
- Release date: 15 April 1988
- Country: India
- Language: Tamil

Sigappu Thali (/θɑːli/ transl. The red thali) is a 1988 Indian Tamil-language film directed by R. Thyagarajan, starring Charan Raj, Ramki, Nishanthi and Saranya. It was released on 15 April 1988.

== Plot ==
Periya Thoppu Panaiyar is the generous and well-loved head of the village. He's raised his daughter Kalamani to be an outspoken tomboy. Periya Thoppu has a wastrel, womanising younger brother, Chinna Thoppu. Sadayan runs errands for the locals and lives off the generosity of the villagers. He is orphaned the son of a Devadasi and is often treated poorly because of that. Sadayan is generally kind-hearted but becomes very belligerent when he's drunk. Kalamani falls in love with Pandikaalai when she attends the boxing classes he teaches. Not knowing this, Periya Thoppu arranges her marriage with someone else. Chinna Thoppu uses this situation to his benefit. He gets Sadayan drunk enough to enter the ceremony and cause a ruckus to stop the engagement.

When a heartbroken Periya Thoppu is alone, Chinna Thoppu murders him and makes it look like a suicide. In this way, he gains control of his brother's wealth. Pandikaalai leaves town for police training and Sadayan promises Kalamani to arrange her marriage with Pandikaalai when he returns. Keerthana is a well-regarded dancer that arrives in town to perform during a festival. Like Sadayan, she's the daughter of a Devadasi and bonds with him over this. She eventually falls in love with him and they marry. Chinna Thoppu is irritated as he's had his eye on Keerthana for a while. He rapes her the night of her wedding causing Keerthana to have a mental breakdown. Kalamani is the only one who knows the truth but is threatened into silence. Pandikaalai, now a police inspector, returns to the village to investigate. The film culminates when Sadayan learns the truth of what happened to his wife and plots out his vengeance.

== Cast ==
- Charan Raj as Sadayan
- Ramki as Pandikaalai
- Nishanthi as Kalamani
- Saranya as Keerthana
- S. S. Chandran as Dance master
- Jai Ganesh as Periya Thoppu Panaiyar
- R. P. Viswam as Chinna Thoppu Panaiyar

== Soundtrack ==
Soundtrack was composed by Shankar–Ganesh and lyrics written by Vairamuthu.

Track listing
No.	Title	Singer(s)	Length
1.	"Odathanni"	K. J. Yesudas, K. S. Chithra
2.	"Nee Than Thotta"	S. Janaki
3.	"Thillalangadi"	S. P. Balasubrahmanyam, S. P. Sailaja
4.	"Maadham Mummari"	Malaysia Vasudevan

== Reception ==
The Indian Express appreciated the film's music and wrote, "Acting honours go to Sharanya and Charanraj". Jayamanmadhan (a duo) of Kalki praised the performances of Saranya, Nishanthi and Viswam. They also praised Charanraj's acting but felt it was difficult to accept him as tragic village hero and were tired of seeing him in the same outfit throughout the film and felt Ramki should stop imitating Prabhu. The duo felt the smooth flow missing in screenplay either going too slow or too fast and called Shankar–Ganesh's music as so so. Tiruvarur M. S. Das won the Tamil Nadu State Film Award for Best Stunt Director.
