= Virinchi Varma =

Indiam film director

Virinchi Varma is an Indian film director who works in Telugu cinema. He made his film debut with Uyyala Jampala in 2013 and also directed Majnu, which featured Nani and Anu Emmanuel in the lead roles. The film was released worldwide on 23 September 2016.

== Career ==
His debut directorial feature film was the 2013 romantic drama, Uyyala Jampala, which was produced by Akkineni Nagarjuna, under Annapurna Studios.

== Filmography ==
| Year | Title |
|---|---|
| 2013 | Uyyala Jampala |
| 2016 | Majnu |
| 2024 | Jithender Reddy |
