= Sirayil Pootha Chinna Malar =

- Poster
- Directed by: Amirtham
- Written by: Arulmozhi (dialogues)
- Screenplay by: Amirtham
- Story by: Amirtham
- Produced by: M. Gopi
- Starring: Vijayakanth; Bhanupriya; Shantipriya; Rajesh
- Cinematography: S. Maruthi Rao; Amirtham
- Edited by: P. Venkateswara Rao
- Music by: Ilaiyaraaja
- Production company: Sri Thirumala Art Productions
- Release date: 21 July 1990
- Running time: 130 minutes
- Country: India
- Language: Tamil

Sirayil Pootha Chinna Malar (transl. The small flower that bloomed in prison) is a 1990 Indian Tamil-language action drama film, directed by Amirtham and produced by M. Gopi. The film stars Vijayakanth, Bhanupriya, Shantipriya and Rajesh. It was released on 21 July 1990.

== Plot ==
Muthappa, a poor singer falls in love with the sister of a cruel landlord Rajalingam. After surviving a murder attempt, Muthappa marries his ladylove. He is shocked to learn that Rajalingam has had a change of heart thereby accepting the relation. However, that night Muttappa and his wife are shifted to a secret and separate prisons by her brother, an evil landlord in such a way that they can never meet each other. After the incident he forbids love in the village and also closes the temple where his sister's marriage was conducted. People forget the presumably dead Muthappa.

Several years later, Parthiban, a courageous young man arrives in the village openly defying the laws of the landlord. He reopens the village temple and helps in uniting lovers. He even humiliates the arrogant children of the landlord much to his anger. On a journey the landlord who hears the long forgotten song of Muthappa confronts the singer who happens to be Parthiban and is shocked to find his similarities to Muthappa.

Who is Parthiban? Is he related to Muthappa? Will Muthappa escape from the prison? What happens later forms the crux of the story.

== Cast ==
- Vijayakanth in dual role as
  - Parthiban
  - Muthappa
- Bhanupriya as Chitra
- Shantipriya as Mangamma
- Rajesh as Rajalingam
- S. S. Chandran
- Jayabharathi as Chitra's Mother
- Tara as Muthappa's wife
- Thyagu as Chitra's Brother
- Charle
- R. Shankaran as Yanai Pandithar
- Kokila
- Sivaraman
- S. A. Kannan
- Azhagu
- Manoj
- Abhinaya
- Vani
- Latha
- Ushapriya
- Premi

== Production ==
Sirayil Pootha Chinna Malar was the home production of Bhanupriya. Amirtham made his directorial comeback with this film after Thooku Medai (1982).

== Soundtrack ==
The music was composed by Ilaiyaraaja.

Song	Singers	Lyrics	Length
"Aalolam Paadum"	Mano, S. Janaki	Vaali	04:40
"Adhisaya Nadamidum"	K. J. Yesudas, K. S. Chithra	Vaali	05:07
"Ethanai Per Unnai Nambi"	K. S. Chithra	Piraisoodan	05:03
"Adi Thaana Pazhutha"	Mano, Saibaba, Kovai Soundararajan, Kausalya	Gangai Amaran	04:27
"Vaasakari Veppilaiye"	Arunmozhi, S. Janaki	Pulamaipithan	04:56
"Vachaan Vachaan"	K. S. Chithra	Gangai Amaran	04:12

== Reception ==
NKS of The Indian Express wrote, "Directed by Amirtham, the film follows the traditional manner of narration".
