= Ontari Poratam =

- Theatrical release poster
- Directed by: K. Raghavendra Rao
- Written by: Marudhuri Raja (dialogues)
- Produced by: B. V. S. N. Prasad
- Starring: Venkatesh; Sohni; Rupini
- Cinematography: K. S. Prakash
- Edited by: Kotagiri Venkateswara Rao
- Music by: Chakravarthy
- Production company: Sri Krishna Prasanna Enterprises
- Release date: 18 May 1989
- Running time: 133 minutes
- Country: India
- Language: Telugu

Ontari Poratam (transl. Lonely Battle) is a 1989 Telugu-language film directed by K. Raghavendra Rao, produced by B. V. S. N. Prasad, under Sri Krishna Prasanna Enterprises. It stars Venkatesh, Sohni (credited as Swetha), and Rupini, with the music composed by K. Chakravarthy. The film was recorded as hit at the box office. The movie was dubbed in Tamil as Jeyithu Kattuvein.

== Plot ==
Raja, an uneducated, intelligent guy, works as a laborer. Priyanka, the daughter of Sudarshan Rao, a multimillionaire, has a lot of arrogance and ego. Raja Rajeswari Devi, Priyanka's lecturer, always instigates her ego. Indu, an unemployed, educated woman, lives in a small room opposite Priyanka's house along with two more unemployed, educated guys, a Scientist and an Engineer. Indu and her gang meet Raja, and they become good friends. Raja and Priyanka always have silly fights and quarrels with each other.

One day, Raja Rajeswari Devi bets with Priyanka to resolve the problem at a shopping complex. Priyanka takes Indu's help. At the same time, Raja requires money for his friend Siddappa's mother's operation. So, Raja says he will resolve the problem if Priyanka is ready to pay the amount. Raja solves the problem very intellectually, but Priyanka cheats on him, which leads to her death. In a fit of anger, Raja insults Priyanka before everybody by kissing her. For that, Sudarshan Rao restrains Raja, and Priyanka beats him very badly. Then Raja throws a challenge to Sudarshan Rao to defeat him in his business within four years, and the bet is that if Raja wins the challenge, Sudarshan Rao should make Priyanka's marriage with him. Sudarshan Rao accepts the challenge. Raja Rajeswari Devi silently observes all these things, and she decides to help him. So, She starts teaching him about life and brings him up as a well-educated person. Raja grows step-by-step with his intelligence and hard work and almost reaches the heights of Sudarshan Rao.

At the same time, Sudarshan Rao discovers that the person behind Raja is Raja Rajeswari Devi, which shocks him because they have vengeance. One more shocking incident, Sudarshan Rao, is that he is none other than Raja's mother, Bhagyalakshmi's brother, his maternal uncle, who has cheated Raja's father and thrown their family on the roads. Meanwhile, Priyanka also understands Raja's good heart and starts loving him. All these things take Sudarshan Rao to a breathless situation; to rescue himself, he brings a person, Sivangi Sivaramakrishna, from jail. Once, Sivaramakrishna insults Raja & Raja Rajeswari Devi on the public dais and declares Raja Rajeswari Devi his wife. Raja questions Raja Rajeswari Devi about what happened; then she reveals the truth; once, Sudarshan Rao was a college chairman where Raja Rajeswari Devi worked as a lecturer, she exposed all his illegal activities in college, and he was arrested. To take revenge, he used her husband Sivaramakrishna as a henchman and tried to molest her, so there she takes a pledge that she won't tie her hair until she sees Sudarshan Rao's end, and she sends Sivaramakrishna to jail. Hearing this, Raja decides to fulfill his teacher's pledge, so he collects all the proof against Sudarshan Rao, which collapses his entire dynasty. Simultaneously, Sudarshan Rao and Sivaramakrishna kidnap Raja Rajeswari Devi and Indu, and Raja protects them. Finally, Raja wins in his challenge and fulfills his teacher's pledge.

== Cast ==
- Venkatesh as Raja
- Sohni (Credited as Swetha) as Priyanka
- Rupini as Indu
- Satyanarayana as Sudarshan Rao
- Mohan Babu as Sivangi Sivaramakrishna
- Jayasudha as Raja Rajeswari Devi
- Brahmanandam as Bangarayah
- Sudhakar as Kesava Scientist
- Anand Raj as Rowdy Govinda Yadav
- Prasanna Kumar as Yogesh
- Guru as Engineer
- Sivaji Raja as Bose
- Chittibabu as Siddappa
- Mada as Vishweshwaraiah, Shopping Complex Owner
- Chidatala Appa Rao as Hotel Owner
- P. J. Sarma as Minister
- Malladi Satyanarayana as House Owner
- Bhimeswara Rao as Doctor
- Annapurna as Bhagyalakshmi
- Shubha as Sudarshan Rao's Wife
- Mamatha as Mangi
- Dubbing Janaki as Siddapa's Mother

== Soundtrack ==
Ontari Poratam

Film score by Chakravarthy
- Released: 1989
- Genre: Soundtrack
- Length: 19:34
- Label: LEO Audio
- Producer: Chakravarthy

Chakravarthy chronology
| Simha Swapnam (1989) | Ontari Poratam (1989) | Vijay (1989) |

Music composed by Chakravarthy. Music released on LEO Audio Company.

| S. No. | Song title | Singers | lyrics | length |
|---|---|---|---|---|
| 1 | "Nuvvu Ready Nenu Ready" | S. P. Balasubrahmanyam, Chitra | Jonnavithhula Ramalingeswara Rao | 3:35 |
| 2 | "Padali Premalona" | S. P. Balasubrahmanyam, P. Susheela | Veturi | 4:04 |
| 3 | "Tippu Tapu Sokuladi" | S. P. Balasubrahmanyam, S. Janaki | Jonnavithhula Ramalingeswara Rao | 4:22 |
| 4 | "Medaloddhu Middheloddhu" | S. P. Balasubrahmanyam, S. Janaki | Jonnavithhula Ramalingeswara Rao | 3:53 |
| 5 | "Pedhavimeedha Muddu" | S. P. Balasubrahmanyam, Chitra | Veturi | 3:40 |
