= Agni (1989 film) =

- Audio Cover
- Directed by: K. Raghavendra Rao
- Written by: Marudhuri Raja (dialogues)
- Screenplay by: K. Raghavendra Rao
- Story by: Satya Murthy
- Produced by: K. S. Prakash
- Starring: Nagarjuna; Shantipriya
- Cinematography: K. S. Prakash
- Edited by: Kotagiri Venkateswara Rao
- Music by: Hamsalekha
- Production company: Sowbhagya Lakshmi Films
- Release date: 9 August 1989
- Running time: 145 mins
- Country: India
- Language: Telugu

Agni (transl. Fire) is a 1989 Telugu-language action film, produced by K. S. Prakash under the Sowbhagya Lakshmi Films banner and directed by K. Raghavendra Rao. It stars Nagarjuna, Shantipriya and music composed by Hamsalekha.

== Cast ==
- Nagarjuna as Pawan Kumar
- Shantipriya as Rekha / Chinnari
- Rao Gopal Rao as K. D. K. Das
- Satyanarayana as Ramachandraiah
- Vanisri as Seeta Mahalakshmi
- Mohan Babu as Video Babu
- Allu Ramalingaiyah
- Rallapalli as M. P. Joginadham
- Brahmanandam as Sahayam
- Narra Venkateswara Rao as S. I. Babu Rao
- Babu Antony
- P. J. Sarma
- Balaji as Kondababu
- Jagga Rao
- Chidatala Appa Rao as Ice Ice
- Telephone Satyanarayana
- Silk Smitha
- Priyanka
- Satyapriya as Usharani
- Kalpana Rai
- Baby Raasi

== Soundtrack ==
Agni

Film score by Hamsalekha
- Released: 1989
- Genre: Soundtrack
- Length: 25:17
- Label: LEO Audio
- Producer: Hamsalekha

Hamsalekha chronology
Aarthanadham (1989)	Agni (1989)	Muthyamantha Muddu (1989)

Music composed by Hamsalekha. Music released on LEO Music Company.

No.	Title	Lyrics	Singer(s)	Length
1.	"Andala Kotalona"	Veturi	S. P. Balasubrahmanyam	4:15
2.	"Ennalla Daka"	Jonnavithhula	S. P. Balasubrahmanyam, S. Janaki	4:10
3.	"Jabilli Edallo"	Veturi	S. P. Balasubrahmanyam, S. Janaki	4:46
4.	"Madanudugaru Inka"	Veturi	S. P. Balasubrahmanyam, S. Janaki	4:03
5.	"O Preyasi Oorvasi"	Jonnavithhula	S. P. Balasubrahmanyam, S. Janaki	4:06
6.	"Premanagaru Preyasiki"	Veturi	S. P. Balasubrahmanyam, S. Janaki	3:57
Total length:				25:17
