= Uyyala Jampala =

2013 Telugu film directed by Virinchi Varma

- Theatrical release poster
- Directed by: Virinchi Varma
- Written by: Virinchi Varma; Ram Mohan P Raj Tarun
- Produced by: Ram Mohan P Nagarjuna
- Starring: Avika; Raj Tarun
- Cinematography: Vishwa Devabattula
- Edited by: Marthand K. Venkatesh; Venkata Krishna Chikkala
- Music by: Sunny M.R.
- Production companies: Sun Shine Cinemas; Annapurna Studios
- Distributed by: Suresh Productions
- Release date: 25 December 2013
- Running time: 124 minutes
- Country: India
- Language: Telugu
- Budget: ₹80 lakhs
- Box office: ₹11 crore distributors' share

Uyyala Jampala is a 2013 Indian Telugu-language romantic comedy drama film directed by Virinchi Varma, produced by Ram Mohan P and Nagarjuna under Sunshine Cinema in association with Annapurna Studios, starring Avika Gor and Raj Tarun.

Uyyala Jampala received positive reviews from critics who appreciated the performances and technical aspects of the film. Gor and Tarun won the Best Female Debut and the Best Male Debut, respectively, at the 3rd South Indian International Movie Awards. The film was remade in Bengali as Parbona Ami Chartey Tokey (2015) and in Kannada as Krishna-Rukku (2016).

== Plot ==
The film is narrated by the protagonist, Soori. He wants to confess his love for his cousin Umadevi. Soori and Umadevi have quarreled since childhood. Umadevi is the daughter of Rangaraju, the younger brother of Soori's mother. Her family lives in a mansion, while Soori and his widowed mother live in a small house beside the mansion. Soori maintains fish ponds near the village. His friend Kodanda is a techie and gossip. A second friend Vasu is a gullible person who always has a "Be positive" attitude. A local belle Sunitha is infatuated with Soori, and is Umadevi's close friend. To tease Umadevi, Soori flirts with Sunitha.

Meanwhile, Umadevi falls in love with a techie Parthu. When Soori observes her neglecting him, he gets suspicious thus he along with Vasu follow Umadevi and find her with Parthu. They learn that Parthu is a mechanic who works in the nearby town's Hero Motorcorp outlet. Soori calls Parthu and tells him that he wants to purchase the bike Parthu uses. After a test drive, Soori beats up Parthu. The wounded Parthu asks Umadevi to elope with him as Parthu's father is trying to arrange a marriage for him. When Umadevi expresses her fear, Parthu announces that he would kill himself if she refuses his request, so she agrees.

After packing her dresses, gifts presented by Parthu, and her ornaments, Umadevi escapes from her house that night and boards a bus with Parthu. Rangaraju creates havoc in his house, and Soori finds out with the help of Sunitha that Umadevi is in Tuni, a major town in East Godavari District. When Parthu and Umadevi exit the bus, Parthu's friends try to kidnap her and Parthu tries to snatch her ornaments. Soori comes with Kodanda and Vasu and rescues Umadevi. Umadevi realizes that Parthu was trapping her when Soori admits with a grin that the love letter written by Parthu for Uma is of hen's blood, but not his own. In a rage Uma beats him.

Umadevi stays at Soori's house as her father is angry with her. She learns from her aunt about true love. She realizes that Suri has true love for her because he pays for pani puri for Uma, buys her a phone, stops her marriage with one of his friends as she asked, and accepts the blame.

Later, Umadevi tells Sunitha that Suri loves her, and not Sunitha which leads to a series of comic situations between them. Later, since Suri stops Uma's marriage, her angry father forbids her to come into his house. Suri declares that he will find a perfect match for Uma. Uma's father was happy when Suri arranged Uma's marriage with a businessman who is a childhood classmate who had huge crush on Umadevi.

Suri's mother is not interested in this marriage. She shouts at him and says that he will miss Uma only after her marriage which makes Suri realize his feelings for Umadevi. Further, Umadevi's actions make Suri believe that she is also in love with him, but he stays quiet. On the day before marriage, Uma thanks Suri for all the beautiful memories, and for all his help and tearfully they agree that he will not attend the marriage. Seeing this, Uma adds sleeping pills in the Lassi and later decides to confess her feelings to Suri, as shown at the beginning of the movie. He sees Uma running towards him. She explains that her marriage has been stopped. He asks why. She discloses that she mixed pills in the Lassi and gave it to the groom, which causes Suri to laugh. When asked why he was running towards the house, he explains that he cannot live without her. They reconcile and marry with the consent of their parents happily ever after.

== Cast ==
- Avika as Uma Devi
  - Kalyani and Pranavi Manukonda as Young Uma Devi
- Raj Tarun as Suri
  - Sai, Kasi and Nikhil Devadula as Young Suri
- Punarnavi Bhupalam as Sunita
- Ravi Varma as Ranga Raju, Uma Devi’s father
- Kireeti Damaraju as Murali
- Anitha Chowdary as Saraswathi, Suri's mother
- Peela Gangadhar as Vasu
- Alluri Hanuma as Kodanda
- Shashank Srivatsavaya as Pardhu
- Geethanjali as Rama Devi
- Tenali Shakuntala as Suri's grandmother
- Parvathi as Subhadra, Uma Devi's mother
- Saagi Subba Raju as Suri's grandfather

== Soundtrack ==
The music and background score was composed by Sunny M.R.

Uyyala Jampala

Soundtrack album by Sunny M.R.
- Released: 15 December 2013
- Recorded: 2013
- Genre: Soundtrack
- Length: 23:39
- Label: Aditya Music
- Producer: Sunny M.R.

Sunny M.R. chronology
Swamy Ra Ra (2013)	Uyyala Jampala (2013)	Rowdy Fellow (2014)

Track listing
No.	Title	Lyrics	Artist(s)	Length
1.	"Uyyalaina Jampalaina"	Vasu Valaboju	Harshika Gudi, Anudeep Dev	4:23
2.	"Lapak Lapak Aiypothundi"	Vasu Valaboju	Harshika Gudi, Bindu, Deepu	5:28
3.	"Nijamga Idi Nenenaa"	Rambabu Gosala	Sunny M.R., Harshika Gudi	4:32
4.	"Mana Bandham"	Vasu Valaboju	Sunny M.R.	4:38
5.	"Dher Tak Chala (Hindi)"	Ashish Pandit	Arijit Singh	4:38
Total length:				23:39

== Critical reception ==
Suresh Kavirayani of Deccan Chronicle wrote: "The movie impresses despite having a predictable plot, with good dialogues, a reasonable length and amazing cinematography." Kavirayani added that, "Full marks to director Virinchi Varma for telling such a touching tale of delicate romance set against a beautiful rural backdrop, with debutante actor Raj Tarun and Avika Gor."

== Remake ==
The film was remade in Bengali as Parbona Ami Chartey Tokey (2015) and in Kannada as Krishna-Rukku (2016).
