= Majnu (2016 film) =

- Theatrical release poster
- Directed by: Virinchi Varma
- Written by: Virinchi Varma
- Produced by: Geetha Golla; P. Kiran
- Starring: Nani; Anu Emmanuel; Riya Suman
- Cinematography: Gnana Sekhar V.S.
- Edited by: Prawin Pudi
- Music by: Gopi Sunder
- Production companies: Anandi Art Creations; Keva Movies
- Release date: 23 September 2016
- Running time: 138 min
- Country: India
- Language: Telugu

Majnu is a 2016 Telugu-language romantic comedy drama film written and directed by Virinchi Varma. It features Nani, Anu Emmanuel, and Riya Suman in the lead roles. The film was released worldwide on 23 September 2016. Both Anu and Riya made their Telugu debut through this film.

== Plot ==
The plot revolves around Aditya, who works as an assistant director for the Baahubali crew. One day, he sees Suma, a woman who works in the office of his friend, Kasi and gets attracted to her while trying to help Kasi in proposing to her. After a series of events and on Suma's continued insistence, Aditya tells Suma his love story that traces its way back to his hometown, Bhimavaram.

In the past, after graduation and getting placed in IT major Infosys, Bengaluru, Aditya and his friends hold a party. In a drunken stupor, he sees Kiran and it is love at first sight for him. Kiran is driving her motorcycle and as an awestruck and frozen Aditya is watching her, she crashes into Aditya and he is rushed to the hospital. In the hospital, he proposes to Kiran before passing out. Aditya leaves his job in Bengaluru to search for Kiran and finds out that she is studying engineering in the same college where he graduated from. While chasing her to her class, the students assume him to be a professor and he continues teaching them. The principal admits Aditya as a junior lecturer as he was impressed by Aditya's teaching skills. After a series of events, Kiran starts to fall for Aditya. One day, when Kiran questions Aditya about what is happening between them, Aditya replies in the form of a love letter and impresses Kiran.

After this story, a crying Aditya runs away from the restaurant. Suma, curious about why they broke up, asks Kasi who informs her that they broke up because of him. One day, Kiran sees Aditya fighting some goons and asks him what happened. It is revealed that the goons had attacked Kasi, hence forcing Aditya to charge on them. When Kiran asks him whether Kasi or herself is more important to him, Aditya replies that his friend is important. Then Aditya tries to convince Kiran but she brushes him off. Fed up with continuous rejection, one day Aditya bursts out and informs Kiran that he will run away to a place where he won't see or remember her.

Suma impressed by Aditya's love story starts getting attracted to him. When Kasi tells him about this, Aditya says that he realized that he is still in love with Kiran and packs up to leave for Bhimavaram. At the railway station, Aditya sees Kiran and is shocked to learn that she is Suma's cousin. At Suma's house, Suma tells Aditya her love story. She loved Raghu who duped her following which she fell into depression. Aditya tries to talk to Kiran, who tells him that she misunderstood Kasi and came to apologize to him but was hurt by his talk. Suma tells Aditya that she and Kiran are going to Mumbai for Kiran's job interview to which he offers to accompany them. In Mumbai, he gives Kiran confidence for her job interview. After returning to Hyderabad, he follows Kiran to Bhimavaram (even fighting goons for her), only to learn that Kiran will marry Hemanth. Kiran and Aditya tell Suma that the woman in Aditya's love story was Kiran. Aditya again tells them that he will run away to a place where he won't see or remember them. Suma, who forgives Aditya, tells Kiran to do the same and gives Aditya's letter to her. Kiran realizes that everything he wrote in the letter was true and informs Hemanth. Hemanth agrees to help them reach Aditya who is leaving for Goa. When Aditya boards the train, Kiran, who follows the train on a bike, catches him while he gets down to drink water. Kiran then proposes to Aditya. The film ends with S. S. Rajamouli calling Aditya and offering him the job of a co-director.

== Cast ==
- Nani as Aditya, Assistant Director to S.S.Rajamouli
- Anu Emmanuel as Kiranmayi "Kiran" (voice dubbed by Chinmayi)
- Riya Suman as Sumanjali "Suma" (credited as Priya Shri)
- Satya as Kashi, Aditya's friend
- Vennela Kishore as Sanjay Leela Bhansali
- Posani Krishna Murali as a Lecturer
- Sivannarayana Naripeddi as College principal
- Saptagiri as Koti, Suma's driver
- Satya Krishnan as Suma's mother
- Raj Madiraju as Aditya's father
- Raj Tarun as Hemanth (cameo appearance)
- S. S. Rajamouli as himself, on the sets of Baahubali: The Conclusion
- Keshav Deepak as Suma's Father

== Soundtrack ==
Majnu

Soundtrack album by Gopi Sunder
- Released: 4 September 2016
- Recorded: 2016
- Genre: Film soundtrack
- Length: 25:06
- Language: Telugu
- Label: Lahari Music
- Producer: Gopi Sunder

Gopi Sunder chronology
Dhooram (2016)	Majnu (2016)	Puli Murugan (2016)

Gopi Sunder was roped in to compose the original soundtrack and score for Majnu. This marked Nani's second collaboration with Sunder after their first collaboration with Bhale Bhale Magadivoy.

No.	Title	Lyrics	Singers(s)	Length
1.	"Kallumoosi"	Sri Mani	Suchith Suresan	03:39
2.	"Oorikey Ala"	Ramajogayya Sastry	Haricharan	05:54
3.	"Andamaina"	Sri Mani	Rahul Nambiar, Hemachandra	04:24
4.	"Jare Jare"	Rambabu Gosala	Naresh Iyer	05:00
5.	"Oye Meghamla"	Sri Mani	Chinmayi Sripada	03:08
6.	"Aadara"	Ramajogayya Sastry	Ranjith, Divya S. Menon	03:01
Total length:				25:06

== Critical response ==
The film received mixed reviews from critics, although many praised Nani's performance and claimed it was the movie's saving grace. The Times of India also commented positively on the small-town setting of the film. On the other hand, reviewers at The Hindu and The Indian Express noted the plot's lack of originality as well as Priya Shri's and Anu Emmanuel's acting deficiencies.
