= Simha Swapnam =

- Theatrical release poster
- Directed by: V. Madhusudhana Rao
- Written by: D. Prabhakar (dialogues)
- Screenplay by: V. Madhusudhana Rao
- Story by: M. D. Sundar
- Based on: Khatron Ke Khiladi (1988)
- Produced by: V. B. Rajendra Prasad
- Starring: Krishnam Raju; Jayasudha; Jagapathi Babu; Vani Viswanath; Shantipriya
- Cinematography: D. Prasad Babu
- Edited by: A. Sreekar Prasad
- Music by: Chakravarthy
- Production company: Jagapathi Art Pictures
- Release date: 17 February 1989
- Running time: 141 minutes
- Country: India
- Language: Telugu

Simha Swapnam (transl. Nightmare) is a 1989 Indian Telugu-language crime film, produced by V. B. Rajendra Prasad under the Jagapathi Art Pictures banner and directed by V. Madhusudhana Rao. It stars Krishnam Raju, Jayasudha, Jagapathi Babu, Vani Viswanath and Shantipriya, with music composed by Chakravarthy. The film is a remake of the Hindi film Khatron Ke Khiladi (1988). This film is the debut of Jagapathi Babu as a hero, with double role performance, both the roles of Sanjay Dutt and Chunky Pandey are done by Jagapathi Babu in Telugu.

== Cast ==
- Krishnam Raju as Balaram / Krishnarjun / Simha Swapnam
- Jayasudha as Annapurna
- Jagapati Babu as Rajesh & Harish (dual role)
- Vani Viswanath as Kavita
- Shantipriya as Sunita
- Gummadi as DSP Raghuram
- Gollapudi Maruti Rao as Vaddikasula Varahala Rao
- Ranganath as Rangapati
- Giri Babu as Inspector Veerabhadram
- Ahuti Prasad as Raghupati
- Chalapathi Rao as Inspector Bhujangam / Bhayankar
- Thyagaraju as I.G.
- Ramana Murthy as Dr. Prakash
- Narra Venkateswara Rao as Deen Dayal
- Pradeep Shakthi as Billa
- Vinod as Shishupal
- Madan as Shiva Ram
- Raj Varma as Kotlingam
- Jaya Bhaskar as Inspector Narayan
- Sarathi as Kanaka Rao
- K. K. Sarma as a priest
- Anitha as Lakshmi
- Sri Lakshmi
- Phani
- Vijayalakshmi
- Shyamala

== Soundtrack ==
Simha Swapnam

Film score by Chakravarthy
- Released: 1989
- Genre: Soundtrack
- Length: 25:47
- Label: AMC Audio
- Producer: Chakravarthy

Chakravarthy chronology
Mamathala Kovela (1989)	Simha Swapnam (1989)	Ontari Poratam (1989)

Music composed by Chakravarthy. Lyrics written by Acharya Aatreya. Music released on AMC Audio Company.

No.	Title	Singer(s)	Length
1.	"Kallalona Neeve Gundelona Neeve"	S. P. Balasubrahmanyam, P. Susheela	3:29
2.	"Chaliki Vaniki"	S. P. Balasubrahmanyam, P. Susheela	4:15
3.	"Jigi Jigi"	S. P. Balasubrahmanyam, P. Susheela	4:26
4.	"Tholi Kougilintha"	S. P. Balasubrahmanyam, P. Susheela	4:22
5.	"Urumi Urumi"	S. P. Balasubrahmanyam, P. Susheela	4:52
6.	"Kallalona Neeve" (Sad)	S. P. Balasubrahmanyam, P. Susheela	4:23
