= Riya Suman =

Indian actress

- Occupation: Actress
- Years active: 2016–present

Riya Suman is an Indian actress who appears mainly in Tamil and Telugu films. She debuted in the commercially successful 2016 Telugu film Majnu.

== Career ==
Riya made her debut in Majnu (2016) opposite Nani. The movie opened to great reviews commercially and critically. She later starred in Paper Boy (2018), which opened to mixed reviews from the critics and audience.The Hans India's critic wrote, "Riya Suman delivered an elegant and beautiful performance. She is not only looking extremely gorgeous in the film but will impress the viewers with her talent as well." Telugu Film Nagar's writer praised the film, writing, "Matured measured performance by Riya Suman." The Telugu Cinema' writer's review said, "Riya Suman shows grace and has a decent screen presence."

Riya's first film in Tamil, titled Seeru (2020), with Jiiva, was directed by Rathna Siva.

== Filmography ==
Key
†	Denotes films that have not yet been released

Year	Title	Role(s)	Language(s)	Notes	Ref.
2016	Majnu	Sumanjali	Telugu	Credited as Priya Shri	
2018	Paper Boy	Dharani	Telugu		
2020	Seeru	Vasuki	Tamil	Nominated—SIIMA Award for Best Female Debut – Tamil	
2021	Malaysia to Amnesia	Bhavna	Tamil		
2022	Manmadha Leelai	Leela	Tamil		
2022	Agent Kannayiram	Aadhirai	Tamil		
2022	Top Gear	Aadya	Telugu		
2024	Hitler	Sara	Tamil		
2024	Jithender Reddy	Gayathri	Telugu		
2024	Kismat	Tanya	Telugu		
2025	Mowgli	Mallika Nayak	Telugu	Cameo appearance	
2026	Love Insurance Kompany	Lakshmi	Tamil	Cameo appearance	
2027	Walking Talking Strawberry Icecream	TBA	Tamil	Filming	
