= Kaboye Alludu =

1987 Indian Telugu comedy film by Relangi Narasimha Rao

- Directed by: Relangi Narasimha Rao
- Written by: Kaasi Viswanath (story / dialogues)
- Screenplay by: Relangi Narasimha Rao
- Produced by: M. Chandra Kumar
- Starring: Rajendra Prasad; Chandra Mohan; Shantipriya; Kalapana
- Cinematography: B. Koteswara Rao
- Edited by: K. Ravindra Babu
- Music by: Chakravarthy
- Production company: P.V.S. Films
- Release date: 27 March 1987
- Running time: 135 mins
- Country: India
- Language: Telugu

Kaboye Alludu (transl. Would be Son-in-law) is a 1987 Telugu-language comedy film, produced by M. Chandra Kumar under the P.V.S. Films banner and directed by Relangi Narasimha Rao. It stars Rajendra Prasad, Chandra Mohan, Shantipriya, Kalpana and music composed by Chakravarthy. It was released on 27 March 1987.

== Cast ==
- Rajendra Prasad as Prasad
- Chandra Mohan as Rambabu / Rajesh
- Shantipriya as Rekha
- Kalpana as Saroja
- Gollapudi Maruthi Rao as Govinda Rao
- Suthi Veerabhadra Rao as Saroja 's father
- Suthi Velu as Satti Babu, Rambabu's sidekick
- Kota Srinivasa Rao as Peddapuram Siddhaiah
- Raavi Kondala Rao as Manager Venkateswara Rao
- Kaasi Viswanath as Maddelapalem Madana Gopala Manmadha Rao
- KK Sarma
- Chidatala Appa Rao as Compounder Appa Rao
- Rama Prabha as Chandramma
- Anuradha as item number
- Y. Vijaya as Meenakshi

== Soundtrack ==
Kaboye Alludu

Film score by K. Chakravarthy
- Released: 1987
- Genre: Soundtrack
- Length: 15:30
- Label: AVM Audio
- Producer: K. Chakravarthy

K. Chakravarthy chronology
Aranyakanda (1987)	Kaboye Alludu (1987)	Dongodochadu (1987)

Soundtrack composed by K. Chakravarthy was released through AVM Audio music label. Lyrics were written by C. Narayana Reddy and Sirivennela Seetharama Sastry.

Track list
No.	Title	Lyrics	Singer(s)	Length
1.	"Endukamma Koyilamma"	Sirivennela Seetharama Sastry	S. P. Balasubrahmanyam, P. Susheela	4:29
2.	"Bujji Bujji Baby"	C. Narayana Reddy	S. P. Balasubrahmanyam, P. Susheela	3:03
3.	"Kammani Andam"	Sirivennela Seetharama Sastry	S. P. Balasubrahmanyam, P. Susheela	4:14
4.	"Sye Sye Saaraa Kottu"	C. Narayana Reddy	Mano, P. Susheela	3:44
Total length:				15:30
