= Shantipriya =

Indian actress

Shanthipriya
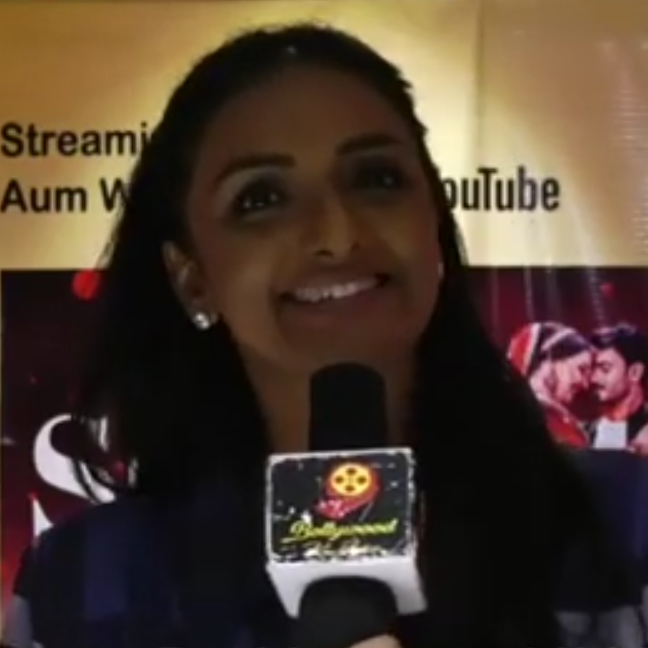
- Born: Rajamahendravaram, Andhra Pradesh, India
- Years active: 1987–1994, 2022 - present 1989, 2002 (Television); 2008–2012 (Television)
- Spouse: Siddharth Ray (m. 1992; died 2004)
- Children: 2
- Relatives: Bhanupriya (Elder sister)

Shanthipriya is an Indian actress and a dancer who has worked predominantly in Tamil, Telugu, and Hindi films. She is credited as Nishanthi in Tamil films and Shanthipriya in Telugu and Hindi films. She is the younger sister of actress Bhanupriya.

== Early life ==
Shanthipriya was born in Rangampeta village near Rajamahendravaram, Andhra Pradesh in a Telugu-speaking family, to Pattabhiram and M.Lakshmi. Her family later moved to Chennai, Tamil Nadu. She has an elder brother Gopikrishana and an elder sister Bhanupriya, who has also been a film actress since the 1980s.

== Career ==
The actress began her journey in films with the 1987 Telugu release Kaboye Alludu, before making her Tamil debut with Enga Ooru Pattukaran the same year.

She was also seen as Shakuntala in the mythological serial Vishwamitra (1989).

After playing the leading lady in close to 25 films across Tamil and Telugu, she forayed into Bollywood with Raj N. Sippy’s Saugandh (1991) which marked the silver screen debut of Akshay Kumar.

She is the brand ambassador for Solitario Diamonds. She is the Advisory board member of World Designing form.

She has modelled for designer Chhaya Gandhi at the Bombay Times Fashion Week. for Sanhita Moulik

She made her stage debut with a dance drama titled Pavitra Tulsi playing the leading role of Tulsi at the Kala Ghoda Arts Festival.

She is also acting in the MX Player series Dharavi Bank.

== Awards and Recognitions ==
- 2023 - International Iconic Women Heroes by Perfect Women Magazine

== Personal life ==
Shanthi Priya married actor Siddharth Ray in 1992. Siddharth was the grandson of V. Shantaram and has acted in films such as Baazigar and Vansh. They became the parents of two sons. Ray died of a heart attack in 2004, at the age of 40.

== Filmography ==
Year	Title	Role	Language	Notes
1987	Kaboye Alludu	Rekha	Telugu	
1987	Naku Pellam Kavali		Telugu	
1987	Enga Ooru Pattukaran	Shenbagam	Tamil	
1987	Ondru Engal Jaathiye		Tamil	
1987	Neram Nalla Irukku	Jyothi	Tamil	
1987	Maharshi	Suchitra	Telugu	
1988	Sakkarai Panthal		Tamil	
1988	Sigappu Thali	Kalamani	Tamil	
1988	Rayilukku Neramachu	Chellakili	Tamil	
1988	Kai Naattu		Tamil	
1988	Dhayam Onnu		Tamil	
1988	Poovizhi Raja		Tamil	
1988	En Vazhi Thani Vazhi		Tamil	
1989	Anthintha Gandu Naanalla	Nishanthi	Kannada	
1989	Ellame En Thangachi	Geetha	Tamil	
1989	Simha Swapnam	Sunita	Telugu	
1989	Yamapasam		Telugu	
1989	Raktha Kanneeru		Telugu	
1989	Agni		Telugu	
1990	Kaliyuga Abhimanyudu	Radha	Telugu	
1990	Sila Sasanam		Telugu	
1990	Anjali	Dancer	Tamil	
1990	Sirayil Pootha Chinna Malar	Mangamma	Tamil	
1990	Aatha Naan Pass Ayittaen	Seetha	Tamil	
1990	Justice Rudramadevi		Telugu	
1991	Saugandh	Chand	Hindi	
1992	Mere Sajana Saath Nibhana		Hindi	
1992	Uyarthavan	Shanthi	Tamil	
1993	Aandha Intaquam		Hindi	
1993	Phool Aur Angaar	Sudha C. Verma	Hindi	
1993	Meherbaan	Neha	Hindi	
1993	Veerta	Maina	Hindi	
1994	Ikke Pe Ikka	Komal	Hindi	
2025	Bad Girl	Sundari	Tamil	

=== Television ===
Year	Serial	Role	Language
1989	Vishwamitra	Shakuntala	Hindi
2002	Aryamaan – Brahmaand Ka Yodha	Teji	Hindi
2008–2011	Mata Ki Chowki - Kalyug Mein Bhakti Ki Shakti	Maa Vaishno Devi	Hindi
2011–2012	Dwarkadheesh – Bhagwaan Shree Krishna	Devaki	Hindi
2022–present	Dharavi Bank	Bonamma	Hindi
