= Top Gear (film) =

- Release poster
- Directed by: Shashikanth
- Produced by: K. V. Sridhar Reddy
- Starring: Aadi Saikumar; Riya Suman
- Cinematography: Sai Sriram
- Edited by: Prawin Pudi
- Music by: Harshavardhan Rameshwar
- Release date: 30 December 2022
- Running time: 121 mins
- Country: India
- Language: Telugu

Top Gear is a 2022 Indian Telugu-language action thriller directed by Shashikanth and starring Aadi Saikumar and Riya Suman. The film was released on 30 December 2022.

== Plot ==
Arjun, a taxi driver, finds himself in trouble when one of his customers turns out to be a drug dealer. When the kingpin kidnaps Arjun's wife, he strives to save her.

== Cast ==
- Aadi Saikumar as Arjun
- Riya Suman as Aadhya
- Brahmaji as Brahmaji
- Mime Gopi as Siddharth
- Shatru as ACP Vikram
- Satyam Rajesh as Rajesh
- Banerjee
- Narra Srinivas

== Release ==
Top Gear was released on 30 December 2022. The film's digital streaming rights were acquired by Amazon Prime Video and was premiered on 20 May 2023.

== Reception ==
A critic from The Times of India wrote that "Director Sashikanth and Aadi Saikumar pull off an engaging thriller filled with guns and gangsters". A critic from OTT Play wrote that "Director Shashikanth’s edge-of-the-seat screenplay is backed by solid efforts from the technical crew, apt casting and has impressive performances".
