= Nandi Awards of 1975 =

Indian Telugu film and TV awards ceremony

The Nandi Awards were presented annually by the Government of Andhra Pradesh to recognise excellence in Telugu cinema. The first awards were presented in 1964. The following won the best films awards in 1975.

== 1975 Nandi Awards Winners List ==
Category	Winner	Film
Best Feature Film	K. Viswanath	Jeevana Jyothi
Second Best Feature Film	Bapu	Mutyala Muggu
Third Best Feature Film	Dasari Narayana Rao	Swargam Narakam
