= Gorantha Deepam =

- Theatrical release poster
- Directed by: Bapu
- Written by: Mullapudi Venkata Ramana
- Story by: Nerella Rama Lakshmi
- Produced by: P. Ramachandra Rao; Mullapudi Venkata Ramana
- Starring: Sreedhar; Mohan Babu; Vanisri; Rao Gopal Rao; Allu Ramalingaiah; Kanta Rao; Suryakantham; G. Varalakshmi; Sakshi Ranga Rao
- Cinematography: Ishan Arya
- Edited by: Mandapati Rama Chandrayya
- Music by: K. V. Mahadevan; Sajjad Hussain
- Distributed by: Chitha Kalpana Films
- Release date: 17 February 1978
- Running time: 154 min
- Country: India
- Language: Telugu

Gorantha Deepam is a 1978 Telugu-language drama film from the writer-director duo of Ramana and Bapu. The film stars Sreedhar, Vanisri and Mohan Babu.

== Plot ==
A young bride, Padmavathi (Vanisri) is sent to her new home with instructions of treating her husband as a father, god, teacher and so on. However, she faces a difficult situation with her exploitative mother-in-law, uncaring husband (Sridhar), and a family friend (Mohan Babu) who tries to rape her. How her virtuousness transforms everyone forms the rest of the story.

== Soundtrack ==
Song	Singers	Lyricist	Duration (mm:ss)
"Gorantha Deepam"	P. Susheela	C. Narayana Reddy	03:58
"Godaka Chevulunteno"	S. P. Balasubramanyam, P. Susheela	Arudra	04:18
"Chandamaa Raavoyi"	P. Susheela		04:11
"Chalmohan Ranga"	P. Susheela, P. B. Srinivas		03:47
"Raayinaina Kakapothini"	P. Susheela	Arudra	03:59
