= Nam Naadu (1969 film) =

- Theatrical release poster
- Directed by: C. P. Jambulingam
- Written by: K. Swornam (dialogues)
- Story by: Mullapudi Venkata Ramana
- Produced by: B. Nagi Reddy; M. G. Chakrapani
- Starring: M. G. Ramachandran; Jayalalithaa
- Cinematography: Konda Reddy; Sundar Babu
- Edited by: C. P. Jambulingam; G. Kalyanasundaram; D. G. Jayaraman
- Music by: M. S. Viswanathan
- Production company: Vijaya International
- Release date: 7 November 1969
- Country: India
- Language: Tamil

Nam Naadu (transl. Our country) is a 1969 Indian Tamil-language action drama film directed by C. P. Jambulingam, starring M. G. Ramachandran and Jayalalithaa. It is a remake of the 1969 Telugu film Kathanayakudu. The film was released on 7 November 1969.

== Plot ==
Dharmalingham, Aalavandar and Punniyakodi are three VIPs in a township who have established themselves as noble citizens of the country but in reality are traitors who would commit any type of crimes for money. Durai is an honest government office clerk who wants to be sincere for the nation and to help the poor and needy. In order to save the rights of the poor he fights with higher society people which is disliked by his brother Muthaiya who works for Dharmalingham and is an equally honest person as Durai. Though Muthaiya scolds Durai for his acts he is very affectionate towards him and Durai is equally respectful and affectionate towards him and his family. Durai once picks a fight with Aalavandar in a shop — he insists on Aalavandar standing in a queue like everyone else as there should be no special right for him over poor people. This creates tension between Aalavandar and Durai. Muthaiya worries that he will get into trouble because Aalavandar and Dharmalingham are good friends.

Durai meets a tender-coconut selling girl Ammu (alias Alamelu) and gets attracted towards her nobility and honesty. Aalavandar takes revenge on Durai by making fake bribery complaint on him and because of which Durai loses his job. The enmity between Dharmalingham and Durai increases gradually because of which his brother shouts at him and ask him to get out of the house as Muthaiya believes Dharmalingham is honest and treat him like God. Ammu supports Durai and takes him to slum. Durai works for them and earn the love of slum people and people support him to contest and win in the municipal election. Durai takes action against the trio with his rights and enmity further increases. The trio plan and succeed to throw Durai away from the municipal office. Meanwhile, Muthaiya finds that Dharmalingham has looted a sum of Ten lakh Rupees which actually belong to the welfare of poor people. So he runs away with the money to save from them and he buries it in a place. But the trio catch him and shut him at a secret place when he refuse to open his mouth on the whereabouts of the money. Now Durai plans to take revenge on them and to reveal themselves and their crimes by their own mouth. Did Durai succeed in his mission and found the money and his brother forms the rest of the story.

== Cast ==
- M. G. Ramachandran as Durai
- Jayalalithaa as Ammu (alias Alamelu)
- S. V. Ranga Rao as Dharmalingham, the chairman
- S. A. Ashokan as Aalavandar
- K. A. Thangavelu as Punniyakodi
- S. V. Ramdas as The doctor
- T. K. Bhagavathi as Muthaiya
- R. S. Manohar as Vijay, Ammu's elder brother
- Ennatha Kannaiya as Kannaiya the lame
- Thengai Srinivasan as Kuppuswamy
- Nagesh as Govindha
- K. R. Ramswamy as Velayudham
- V. Nagayya as Kandhaya
- Mukkamala
- Pandari Bai as Bakiyum
- Kutty Padmini as Selvi
- Baby Sridevi as Raja

== Production ==
After the success of Enga Veettu Pillai (1965) produced by B. Nagi Reddy, actor M. G. Ramachandran was considering an entry into politics, so he told Reddy that he wanted to make a film to gauge audience response to seeing him as a politician. Nagi Reddy suggested remaking the Telugu film Kathanayakudu; Ramachandran agreed and remade the film as Nam Naadu. The dialogues were written by K. Sornam. Unlike the Telugu original, Nam Naadu had many politically charged dialogues because, according to film historian Prakash Raman, that was the period Ramachandran was about to launch his own party, the All India Anna Dravida Munnetra Kazhagam.

== Soundtrack ==
Music is composed by M. S. Viswanathan, with lyrics by Vaali.

Track listing
No.	Title	Singer(s)	Length
1.	"Aadai Muzhudhum"	P. Susheela	04:34
2.	"Nalla Perai"	T. M. Soundararajan, Shobha, L. R. Anjali	04:09
3.	"Naan 7 Vayasilae"	L. R. Eswari	03:49
4.	"Ninathathai Nadathiyae"	T. M. Soundararajan, L. R. Eswari	04:56
5.	"Vangaya Vathyaraiya"	T. M. Soundararajan, P. Susheela	04:59
6.	"Kudigaran Pechu"	L. R. Eswari	04:06
Total length:			26:33

== Release and reception ==
Nam Naadu was released on 7 November 1969. The Indian Express wrote, "That contemporary politics can be made into a successful film is proved by Vijaya International's Nam Nadu". The reviewer went on to say, "Colour is pleasing. The editing is component. Music by M. S. Viswanathan fails. The film is too long." Nagi Reddy recalled watching the film with Ramachandran: "When it was released, we both went to Mekala Theatre to watch the reaction of the viewers. Except for the manager, no one was aware of our presence. It was a pleasant evening and the doors had been kept wide open. MGR stood leaning on one side of the door and I was leaning on the other. There was a scene in which Jayalalitha, the heroine of the movie, appeared singing the song Vaangaiya Vaathiyaraiah while welcoming MGR after his victory in the elections." Reddy went on to say "The audience rose as one man, cheering, clapping, whistling. There were cries: 'We want to see the scene again! Repeat the scene!' We advised the manager to oblige the audience. The reel was rewound and the sequence was shown again. I turned to MGR. His eyes were filled with tears of joy. He hugged me. 'O Reddiar! I have received the people's acceptance.'
