= Budugu =

- First appearance: November 1956 as Serial, 1962 as cartoons
- Created by: Mullapudi Venkata Ramana
- Comic: Budugu

Budugu is a fictional character created by Mullapudi Venkata Ramana of Andhra Pradesh in India. "Budugu" was the childhood nickname of Ramana. His sister was called "Budigi".

Budugu is a precocious and bratty child, characterized by his inimitably childish Telugu. Mullapudi describes the world as seen through his eyes with humor. Budugu has an opinion about everything. He talks about culture, raising children, politicians and the 13th table. His lifetime ambition is to become a horse-cart driver or a train driver.

Budugu's immediate family include his parents Radha and Gopalam, his grandmother Bamma, and his unmarried uncle Baabai. His neighbors include Laavupaati Pakkinti Pinnigaru and her husband and Budugu's child love C Gaana Pasoonamba.

Budugu – Chichuta Pidugu is the name of the serial (published by Andhra Pathrika) in which Mullapudi introduces Budugu. The work is autobiographical in nature, where the author describes his childhood thoughts and happenings. The rest is all in the spirit of imagination. This collection later appeared in two volumes.

The drawings of Budugu are by Bapu, a maker of Telugu films. Bapu focuses on capturing the characters' expressions.

Budugu is a pet name for the child and was later used for a whole generation of children in Andhra Pradesh.

== Characters ==
=== Family members ===
- Father (Gopalam)
- Mother (Radha)
- Grandmother (Baamma): She calls him "Haari Piduga". She backs and protects Budugu.
- Uncle (Baabai)

=== Other characters ===
- Rendu Jadalla Seeta (Seeta with two plaits)
- Pakkinti Lavupati Pinnigaru (Neighboring fat lady who often comes to Budugu's house)
- Tutor (Budugu doesn't like him and other tutors in general)
- Sii Gaana Pesunaamba (Budugu has a crush on her, who is a year younger and always teases him)
