= Sakshi (film) =

1967 film directed by Bapu

- Poster
- Directed by: Bapu
- Screenplay by: Bapu
- Story by: Mullapudi Venkata Ramana
- Produced by: Suresh Kumar; Seshagiri Rao
- Starring: Krishna; Vijaya Nirmala; Vijaya Lalitha
- Cinematography: P. N. Selvaraj
- Edited by: Satyam
- Music by: K. V. Mahadevan
- Production company: Nandana Films
- Release date: 1 July 1967
- Running time: 142 minutes
- Country: India
- Language: Telugu

Sakshi (transl. Witness) is a 1967 Indian Telugu-language drama film written and directed by Bapu. The film stars Krishna, Vijaya Nirmala and Vijaya Lalitha, with Ramana Panthulu, Raja Babu, Chalapathi Rao, Allu Venkateswarlu, Jagga Rao and R. Ranga Rao in supporting roles. It is based on Mullapudi Venkata Ramana's 1959 story of the same name which itself was inspired by the 1952 American film High Noon. In Sakshi, a naïve and bucolic boatman is exploited by society and turns into a hard-hearted person.

Sakshi, the directorial debut of Bapu (who also worked as art director), was the first Telugu film to be shot completely in outdoor locations, with filming taking place in Pulidindi, a village located on the banks of the Godavari River. It was the acting debut of Ranga Rao, who later prefixed the film's title to his name. The entire film was completed in less than 20 days.

Sakshi was released on 1 July 1967. Although many people in the Telugu film industry believed the film would not run for even 20 days in theatres, it ran for almost a month and became a profitable venture, besides receiving critical acclaim. It was later screened at the Tashkent film festival in 1968, where it was also well received. The film received critical acclaim during its screening at the Tashkent film festival.

== Plot ==
Kishtaiah is a naïve and bucolic boatman living in Dachampaadu, an islet in the Godavari belt. In the same area lives Fakeeru, a dreaded criminal. The village head, known by his title Munasabu, hires Fakeeru as his lorry driver to transport coconuts to the town. The only person Fakeeru cares for in the village is his sister Chukka. He abandons Ratthi, a woman who was madly in love with him. Kishtayya's uncle Gourayya and his fellow guard are murdered by Fakeeru when trying to stop him from stealing coconuts from Munasabu's garden. As Kishtayya is the sole witness to these murders, the village elders force him to testify against Fakeeru in court.

Fakeeru is arrested, but vows revenge. He escapes from prison, and no villager gives Kishtayya shelter. Chukka marries Kishtayya, in the hope that her brother would not kill him. Fakeeru is unaware of this and attacks Kishtayya, who eventually abandons his naïve persona and kills Fakeeru. All the villagers who earlier shunned Kishtayya now surround him, but Kishtayya, disgusted with their selfish behaviour, leaves the village and surrenders to the police.

== Cast ==
- Krishna as Kishtayya
- Vijaya Nirmala as Chukka
- Vijaya Lalitha as Ratthi
- Ramana Panthulu as Munasabu
- Raja Babu as Munasabu's son
- Chalapathi Rao as Gourayya
- Allu Venkateswarlu as Gopi
- Jagga Rao as Fakeeru
- R. Ranga Rao as Karanam

== Production ==
=== Development ===
Sakshi was a story written by Mullapudi Venkata Ramana and published in the 28 October 1959 issue of Andhra Patrika, a weekly newspaper. The story was inspired by the American film High Noon (1952), retaining the plot element of a man sending a dreaded criminal to prison, and the criminal vowing revenge. For his directorial debut, Ramana's friend Bapu decided to adapt Sakshi. The film adaptation was produced by Suresh Kumar and Seshagiri Rao under Nandana Films. P. N. Selvaraj was chosen as the cinematographer at Bapu's suggestion. Bapu also worked as art director alongside Bhavaraju Seetharamudu, an engineer who helped the unit by laying new roads. Ramana wrote the film's dialogue, with most of it being in Rajahmundry dialect. Satyam handled the editing.

=== Casting and filming ===
Krishna was cast as the male lead Kishtayya. R. Ranga Rao was cast as Karanam in his acting debut, and later became known as Sakshi Ranga Rao. Krishna's future wife Vijaya Nirmala was cast as the female lead Chukka, and this was the first film where they acted together. Before the commencement of principal photography, Bapu took lessons on how to deal with close-up, mid-close-up and long shots from Kabir Das. Sakshi became the first Telugu film to be shot completely in outdoor locations. Pulidindi, a village located on the banks of the Godavari River, was chosen as the shooting location. According to Nirmala, after each day's shoot ended, Bapu "used to draw lines of his next day's shooting. He always drew his thoughts on paper so that everyone was comfortable when the shooting started." The scene depicting Kishtayya and Chukka's marriage was shot at the Meesala Krishnudu temple of Pulidindi. The entire film was completed in less than 20 days.

== Themes ==
The Encyclopaedia of Indian Cinema calls Sakshi "a rare instance of late 60s New Indian Cinema aestheticism in Telugu". According to The Hindu's Srivathsan Nadadhur, "The film not only lays importance on the crime angle, but also emphasises the need for humans to stand up for each other in times of crisis."

== Soundtrack ==
The soundtrack was composed by K. V. Mahadevan.

No.	Title	Lyrics	Singer(s)	Length
1.	"Atu Yennela Itu Yennela"	Aarudhra	P. Susheela	4:11
2.	"Dayaledha Neeku Dayaledha"	Aarudhra	P. Susheela, P. B. Sreenivas	8:08
3.	"Silipoda Sinnoda Cheera Dochukunnoda"	Daasarathi Krishnamacharyulu	P. Susheela, Ghantasala	3:47
4.	"Amma Kadupu Challaga Atha Kadupu Challaga"	Aarudhra	P. Susheela	4:19
5.	"Padhi Mandhi Kosam Nilabadda Neeku"	Aarudhra	Mohan Raju	5:28
6.	"Gunaasari Gunamma"	—	—

== Release and reception ==
Sakshi was released on 1 July 1967. It was publicised via posters with the tagline "20 rojullo teesina chitram" (the film which was shot in less than 20 days), and rival producer Aluri Chakrapani caustically commented, "20 rojullo teeste 20 rojule aaduddi" (the film will only run 20 days), a view shared by many others in the Telugu film industry. Despite this, the film received critical acclaim and ran for nearly a month, recovering its investment and making a marginal profit. It was later screened at the Tashkent film festival in 1968, where it was also well received.

== Bibliography ==
- Rajadhyaksha, Ashish; Willemen, Paul (1998) [1994]. Encyclopaedia of Indian Cinema. British Film Institute and Oxford University Press. ISBN 0-19-563579-5.
