= Edi Dharmam Edi Nyayam? =

Edi Dharmam Edi Nyayam
- Poster of Telugu version
- Directed by: Bapu
- Written by: V. C. Guhanathan (Tamil dialogues); Mullapudi Venkataramana (Telugu dialogues)
- Story by: Shabd Kumar
- Produced by: Sathyanarayana; Suryanarayana
- Starring: Bhanu Chander; Madhavi
- Cinematography: P. Bhaskar Rao
- Edited by: V. Jagadeesh
- Music by: K. V. Mahadevan
- Production company: Satyachitra Combines
- Release dates: 11 February 1982 (Telugu); 22 October 1982 (Tamil)
- Country: India
- Languages: Telugu; Tamil

Edi Dharmam Edi Nyayam (transl. Which Is Duty, Which Is Justice?) is a 1982 Indian Telugu-language thriller film simultaneously made in Tamil as Neethi Devan Mayakkam (transl. God of Justice is unconscious). Directed by Bapu, the film stars Bhanu Chander and Madhavi. Kamal Haasan acted as a Military Officer in a guest appearance in the Tamil version and in Telugu by Krishna. The film was a remake of the Hindi film Insaf Ka Tarazu, which in turn was a remake of the 1976 Hollywood film Lipstick.

== Cast ==
- Bhanu Chander as Rajesh
- Madhavi as Bharathi
- Janavi as Aarthi (Bharathi's younger sister)
- Devi
- Raja as Ashok (Bharathi's lover)
- Jaggayya as Criminal lawyer (Telugu)
- Major Sundarrajan as Criminal lawyer (Tamil)
- Sowcar Janaki as Lawyer
- Manorama
- Krishna as a military officer (guest appearance; Telugu)
- Kamal Haasan as a military officer (guest appearance; Tamil)

== Soundtrack ==
Telugu track listing
No.	Title	Singer(s)	Length
1.	"Dharmam Thulabharam"	S. P. Balasubrahmanyam
2.	"Tailore"	S. P. Balasubrahmanyam, P. Susheela, S.P. Sailaja
3.	"Aaru Nelalu"	S. P. Balasubrahmanyam, P. Susheela
4.	"Ponchivunna"	P. Susheela

Tamil track listing
No.	Title	Lyrics	Singer(s)	Length
1.	"Dharma Thulabaram"	Kannadasan	S. P. Balasubrahmanyam
2.	"Oththikaiyil"	Kannadasan	S. P. Balasubrahmanyam, P. Susheela, S. P. Sailaja
3.	"Neethi Devan"	Kannadasan	P. Susheela
4.	"Aaru Erandu"	Kannadasan	S. P. Balasubrahmanyam, P. Susheela

== Reception ==
Reviewing Tamil version for Kalki, Thiraignani praised the acting of Madhavi and Devi, Guhanathan's dialogues and concluded calling it written question and answer book for the English word rape.
