= Bullet (1985 film) =

- Poster
- Directed by: Bapu
- Written by: Mullapudi Venkata Ramana
- Produced by: Mullapudi Venkata Ramana; Krishnam Raju (presenter)
- Starring: Krishnam Raju; Suhasini
- Cinematography: Thomas Xavier
- Music by: K. V. Mahadevan
- Production company: Chitra Kalpana Films
- Release date: 28 June 1985
- Country: India
- Language: Telugu

Bullet is a 1985 Indian Telugu-language action drama film directed by Bapu, written and produced by Mullapudi Venkata Ramana. The film stars Krishnam Raju and Suhasini. The music was scored by K. V. Mahadevan. The lyrics were written by Veturi.

== Cast ==
- Krishnam Raju as Ch. V. V. Varahala Raju / Bullet
- Suhasini as Usha
- Suryakantham
- Gummadi
- Rao Gopal Rao as Raoji
- Prabhakar Reddy
- S. Varalakshmi
- Tara
- Raavi Kondala Rao

== Soundtrack ==
Bullet

Soundtrack album by K. V. Mahadevan
- Released: January 1985
- Recorded: 1984
- Genre: Feature film soundtrack

No.	Title	Singer(s)	Length
1.	"Maa Telugu Thalliki"	S.P. Balasubramaniam
2.	"Na Chavlatu"	S.P. Balasubramaniam, Vani Jayaram
3.	"Nalogi Vanu"	Vani Jayaram
4.	"Naduvumeetha"	S.P. Balasubramaniam, Vani Jayaram
5.	"Bullet Bullet"	S.P. Balasubramaniam
6.	"Radhakrinakudu"	S.P. Balasubramaniam, S.P. Sailaja
