= Kathanayakudu (1969 film) =

- Theatrical release poster
- Directed by: K. Hemambaradhara Rao
- Written by: Bhamidipati Radhakrishna (dialogues)
- Screenplay by: K. Hemambharadhara Rao
- Story by: Mullapudi Venkata Ramana
- Produced by: K. Gopala Krishna
- Starring: N. T. Rama Rao; Jayalalithaa
- Cinematography: V. S. R. Swamy
- Edited by: Vaasu
- Music by: T. V. Raju
- Production company: Gopala Krishna Productions
- Release date: 27 February 1969
- Running time: 171 minutes
- Country: India
- Language: Telugu

Kathanayakudu (transl. Hero) is a 1969 Indian Telugu-language action drama film, produced by K. Gopala Krishna under the banner Gopala Krishna Productions and directed by K. Hemambaradhara Rao. It stars N. T. Rama Rao and Jayalalithaa, with music composed by T. V. Raju. The film was remade in Tamil as Nam Naadu (1969), and in Hindi as Apna Desh (1972). The film was recorded as a blockbuster at the box office. The film won two Nandi Awards.

== Cast ==
- N. T. Rama Rao as Saradhi
- Jayalalithaa as Jayalakshmi
- Nagabhushanam as Dayanandam
- V. Nagayya as Chalapathi Rao
- Mikkilineni as Sathya Murthy
- Dhulipala as Srinivasa Rao
- Mukkamala as Sethji
- Prabhakar Reddy as Nagulu
- Allu Ramalingaiah as Appadu
- Padmanabham as Simham
- Raja Babu as Puliraju
- Raavi Kondala Rao as Rama's father
- Kakarala as Kaka Rao
- Jagga Rao as Inspector
- Chalapathi Rao as Officer
- T. G. Kamala Devi as Srinivasra Rao's wife
- Rama Prabha as Rama
- Radha Kumari as Rama's mother
- Baby Padmini as Sarada

== Soundtrack ==
Kathanayakudu

Film score by T. V. Raju
- Released: 1969
- Genre: Soundtrack
- Producer: T. V. Raju

Music composed by T. V. Raju. Music released on Audio Company.

S.No	Song title	Lyrics	Singers	length
1	"Pallandi Pallu"	Kosaraju	L. R. Eswari	
2	"Manchivadu Maa Babai"	Dasaradhi	P. Susheela, Bangalore Latha	4:15
3	"Raavela Dayaleda"	Kosaraju	Madhavapeddi Satyam, Pithapuram	
4	"Vinnavayya Ramaiah"	Kosaraju	Ghantasala, P. Susheela	5:35
5	"Mutyala Jallu Kurise"	Dasaradhi	P. Susheela	3:44
6	"Intenaya Telusukovaya"	Dasaradhi	Ghantasala	5:09
7	"Vayasumallina Bulloda"	Dasaradhi	P. Susheela	4:06

== Awards ==
Nandi Awards - 1969

- Best Feature Film - Gold - K. Bala Krishna
- Best Story Writer - Mullapudi Venkata Ramana
