= Sri Rama Rajyam =

- Theatrical release poster
- Directed by: Bapu
- Screenplay by: Bapu-Ramana
- Story by: Bapu-Ramana
- Based on: Ramayanam by Valmiki
- Produced by: Yalamanchali Saibabu
- Starring: Akkineni Nageswara Rao; Nandamuri Balakrishna; Nayanthara; Srikanth
- Cinematography: P. R. K. Raju
- Edited by: G. G. Krishna Rao
- Music by: Ilaiyaraaja
- Production company: Sri Sai Baba Movies
- Release date: 17 November 2011
- Running time: 172 minutes
- Country: India
- Language: Telugu
- Box office: ₹72 crore (US$7.7 million)(India)

Sri Rama Rajyam (transl. The Kingdom of Lord Rama) is a 2011 Indian Telugu-language devotional film directed by Bapu (in his last venture) who co-wrote the film with Mullapudi Venkata Ramana, and produced by Yalamanchali Saibabu. The film stars Nandamuri Balakrishna, Nayanthara, Akkineni Nageswara Rao, Srikanth, and its music was composed by Ilaiyaraaja, which won him Nandi Award for Best Music Director. Sri Rama Rajyam is a reboot of the 1963 blockbuster film Lava Kusa, which is itself based on the Ramayanam by Valmiki, the story focusing on Lava and Kusha, the twin sons of Rama and Sita.

Upon its release, Sri Rama Rajyam received positive reviews and became a commercial success. Sri Rama Rajyam garnered seven State Nandi Awards, including the Nandi Award for Best Feature Film; three Filmfare Awards South, and one SIIMA Award. The film was featured at the 42nd IFFI on 28 November 2011. The film was simultaneously dubbed into Tamil, and Malayalam with the same title, and in Hindi as Ayodhyapati Sri Ram.

== Plot ==
After slaying the demon king Ravana for abducting his wife Sita, the exiled prince Rama returns to Ayodhya alongside Sita and his brother, Lakshmana. Subsequently, Rama is crowned ruler of Ayodha, ushering in an era of peace, prosperity, and joy. However, royal spies report that a washerman in the kingdom has publicly questioned Sita's purity due to her prolonged captivity in Ravana's Lanka. Bound by his Dharma as a king to prioritize appeasing his citizens above his personal happiness, Rama heavy-heartedly instructs Lakshmana to abandon the pregnant Sita in the forest near the ashram of Sage Valmiki.

Lakshmana reluctantly leaves an oblivious Sita near the ashram and informs her about Rama's predicament. Valmiki offers her refuge under the pseudonym Lakshmi Devi. Shortly after, Sita gives birth to twin sons, Lava and Kusha. Hanuman, Rama's devoted companion, arrives at the ashram in disguise of a young boy named Balaraju to take care of Sita and her sons. Valmiki trains the boys in Vedas, martial arts, and Astras, while Sita raises them without revealing their royal lineage. Valmiki composes the Ramayana, chronicling Rama's life, and teaches the twins to sing the epic.

Meanwhile, in Ayodhya, a sorrowful Rama leads an ascetic life. In response to severe drought and famine, Rama decides to conduct the Ashvamedha Yagna. As traditions require the presence of his wife for the yagna, Rama rejects suggestions to remarry and instead commissions a golden statue of Sita to sit beside him during the rituals. Meanwhile, the citizens of Ayodhya grow to deeply repent their harsh judgment and actions towards Sita.

Unaware of their royal lineage, the twins travel across the kingdom of Ayodhya performing the epic. When they recite the poem before Rama, he is deeply moved by their talent. However, upon learning how Rama abandoned Sita to appease public rumour, the twins openly denounce the King's decision as unjust and refuse to accept his royal patronage. Upon learning of the upcoming Ashvamedha Yagna, Sita suspects that Rama has remarried to fulfil the ritual's requirements. To clear her doubts, Sage Valmiki uses his spiritual powers to send her soul to Ayodhya. There, Sita witnesses her golden statue commissioned by Rama, while a grief-stricken Rama briefly senses her presence. Realizing that Rama remains entirely devoted to her, a deeply moved Sita returns with her faith fully restored.

On the day of yagna, the ceremonial horse to set loose to roam freely across kingdoms; any person who captures it must face Rama's army. The horse enters the forest near Valmiki's ashram, where Lava and Kusha capture and tether it. When royal troops led by Lakshmana attempt to retrieve the horse, the boys engage them in battle and defeat Lakshmana using divine weaponry.

Learning of his forces' defeat by the young hermits, Rama travels to the forest to face them himself. Despite his peaceful approach, the boys refuse to release the horse, prompting a confrontation. Hanuman informs Sita of the impending duel, causing her to intervene and reveal the twins' true parentage to Rama. Seeking reconciliation, Rama asks Sita to return to Ayodhya, but she refuses to undergo further public scrutiny to prove her virtue. Expressing her profound gratitude to Valmiki for raising her sons, Sita invokes her mother, Bhudevi, to assert her fidelity. Bhudevi emerges and carries Sita down into the earth, leaving Rama and their sons watching helplessly. In the aftermath, Rama crowns the twins as the rulers of Ayodhya. Having fulfilled his duties, Rama ends his avatar to return to Vaikuntha in his original form as Vishnu, where he reunites with Sita in her original form as Lakshmi.

== Cast ==
- Nandamuri Balakrishna as Rama / Vishnu
- Nayanthara as Sita / Lakshmi
- Akkineni Nageswara Rao as Valmiki
- Srikanth as Lakshmana
- Sameer Hasan as Bharata
- K. R. Vijaya as Kousalya Devi
- Shanoor Sana as Kaikeyi
- Sandhya Janak as Sumitra
- Vindu Dara Singh as Hanuman
  - Pavan Sriram as Balaraju (Young Hanuman)
- Gaurav as Lava
- Dhanush Kumar as Kusha
- Murali Mohan as Janaka Maha Raju
- Sudha as Sunayana
- M. Balaiah as Maharshi Vashistha
- Roja as Bhudevi
- Brahmanandam as Chakali Tippadu
- Jhansi as Chakali Tippadu’s Wife
- AVS as Narada
- Hema as Mandodari
- Nagineedu as Rishyashrunga
- Raghunatha Reddy

== Production ==
=== Development ===
Veteran director Bapu announced that he would remake the 1963 film Lava Kusa with Balakrishna who reprises the role of Lord Rama which was enacted by his father N. T. Rama Rao in the original film. Bapu's friend, Mullapudi Venkata Ramana, wrote the screenplay and dialogues for the film and it was notably his last film as he died before the film's release. Bapu said that the title of the film was inspired from 1943 Hindi film Ram Rajya.

Balakrishna was assigned to play Rama. Mamta Mohandas was the original choice after considering Jyothika, Anushka Shetty and Sneha. But she couldn't do it owing to her cancer treatment, after which Nayanthara was selected to play Sita. Balakrishna said that when Saibabu approached him for the role the moment he said that Bapu is to direct the film, without any questions, he immediately said ‘yes'. For the character, Balakrishna had to shave off his mustache. Sandhya Janak was selected to play the role of queen Sumithra. Saikumar was initially approached to enact the character of Bharatha but he was eventually replaced by Sameer. Gaurav, Dhanush, and Pawan were selected to play the characters of Lava, Kusa and young Hanuman.

=== Filming ===
"A mythological film calls for a lot of work as the sets need to have a period look. For "Sri Ramarajayam" I made huge sets of durbars and palace interiors. My art director gave the sketch to the RFC staff and they created the set for us. Nearly 700 workers from RFC worked on the sets and completed it on time".

— Yalamanchili Saibabu about the set designs of the film.

The filming began on 22 November 2010. The costumes for the film was designed by Anu Vardhan. Anu stated that for Nayanthara, she went and picked up tulasi mala from authentic places. Balakrishna had used his father's accessories and jewellery and Anu replicated it to match with the heroine. Yugandhar Tammareddy of Pixelloid said that Bapu and his team gave storyboards down to the last detail. Along with 100 of his team members, Yugandhar had his task cut out. "The breathtaking palace, the pushpaka vimanam, the Bhoodevi sequence…" were all created by his team. Yugandhar said: "For the palace, we asked the filmmakers to erect a 12-foot palace set just so that there is authenticity when people walk on the floor, lean against a wall or touch a piece of furniture. The rest was done on visual effects". The film was entirely shot at Ramoji Film City with a set erected resembling a kingdom.

== Music ==
The audio of the film was released on 15 August 2011 and the launch was held at Bhadrachalam under Bhadradri Ramayya and Seetamma's Sannidi on the same day. The soundtrack was composed by Ilaiyaraaja and it features 15 tracks. The lyrics for the Telugu version were written by Jonnavithhula Ramalingeswara Rao, while Mankombu Gopalakrishnan and Piraisoodan penned the lyrics for the Malayalam and Tamil versions respectively.

== Release ==
=== Theatrical ===
The film was released on 17 November 2011. The film was released in Tamil on 27 July 2012. The Malayalam version was released as well. Initially scheduled to be released on 10 November but was postponed. Producer Sai Babu has said that a good response has come from Malayalam movie lovers and that he planned to release the Hindi version.

=== Marketing ===
The film was promoted with posters attached in tricycles. P. V. V. Raghavendra Babu, general manager of Prathima Multiplex told "We want to bring back olden days of publicity for the latest mythological movie of Sri Rama Rajyam and get film lovers back to the theatres".

== Reception ==
=== Box office ===
The film completed 50 days on 5 January 2012 in 49 centres at the box office.

=== Critical response ===
The film received positive reviews from critics. CNN-IBN which gave a four stars, said "Sri Rama Rajyam is one film that the Telugu film industry can be proud of. Sri Rama Rajyam is a well-known story, so it's a challenge to remake such a classic, but Bapu's good work turns the remake into another classic. Filmgoers, who look for classics, should not miss this film".

Deccan Chronicle rated three stars explains "Superstar Balakrishna finally stepped into his legendary father NTR's shoes and impressed audiences playing the role of Lord Rama. Veteran director Bapu deserves all the praise he gets for remaking the classic Lava Kusa (1963) and retaining the soul of the original". NDTV described as "In all, Sri Rama Rajyam is a feel-good film that brilliantly showcases our ancient culture".

Oneindia.in noted "Sri Rama Rajyam is a feel good film that showcases our ancient culture, heritage and values. The way Bapu managed to make the film into a visual and musical delight is extraordinary and it is a film that can give you an enriching experience while entertaining you in good measure". Rediff gave three stars said "Kudos to Bapu and Saibabu for recreating the Ramayana magic on celluloid. Only Bapu, the veteran director, could have executed this mammoth task so well. Sri Ramarajyam is an optical feast. Go for it". Sify gave verdict as "Good" and says "The movie holds ample strength to live up to the expectations at the box office. Bapu and his associate Ramana does not deviate much from Lava Kusa, and they took great pains to see that the element of exaggeration is completely checked". The Hindu wrote: "The director Bapu should be applauded for re-inventing the mythological and using a glitzy starcast and getting an understated performance from all of them".

=== Accolades ===
Ceremony	Category	Nominee	Result
Nandi Awards - 2011	Best Feature Film – Gold	Sai Babu	Won
Nandi Awards - 2011	Best Actress	Nayanthara	Won
Nandi Awards - 2011	Best Music Director	Ilaiyaraaja	Won
Nandi Awards - 2011	Best Cinematography	Raju	Won
Nandi Awards - 2011	Best Make Up	P. Ram Babu	Won
Nandi Awards - 2011	Best Female Dubbing Artist	Sunitha	Won
Nandi Awards - 2011	Best Choreographer	Sreenu	Won
59th Filmfare Awards South	Best Actress – Telugu	Nayanthara	Won
59th Filmfare Awards South	Best Female Playback Singer – Telugu	Shreya Ghoshal; ("Jagadhananda Karaka")	Won
59th Filmfare Awards South	Best Lyricist – Telugu	Jonnavithhula Ramalingeswara Rao; ("Jagadhananda Karaka")	Won
1st South Indian International Movie Awards	SIIMA Award for Best Cinematographer (Telugu)	P. R. K. Raju	Won

== Legacy ==
Director K. Viswanath compared the duo Bapu and Ramana to "technically perfect and smooth Rolls Royce". A novel of the film based on the screenplay was released in 2012. Rediff included the film in their list "Top Five Telugu Films of 2011".
