= Mera Dharam =

- Poster
- Directed by: Bapu
- Screenplay by: Vinay Shukla
- Produced by: Ratan Irani
- Starring: Jackie Shroff; Amrita Singh
- Cinematography: Baba Azmi
- Edited by: N. Chandra
- Music by: Bappi Lahiri
- Release date: 16 May 1986
- Country: India
- Language: Hindi

Mera Dharam (My Religion) is a 1986 Indian Bollywood film directed by Bapu and produced by Ratan Irani. It stars Jackie Shroff, Amrita Singh in pivotal roles. The music of the film was composed by Bappi Lahiri.

== Cast ==
- Jackie Shroff as Jai Singh Sengar
- Amrita Singh as Durga Singh
- Shakti Kapoor as Bhanwar Singh Danga
- Romesh Sharma as Vishal Singh Sengar
- Aruna Irani as Mrs. Vishal Singh Sengar
- Pradeep Kumar as Hari Singh Sengar
- Bharat Bhushan as Baba
- Sharat Saxena as Chana
- Sudhir Pandey as Sewaram Tiwari
- Amrish Puri as Thakur Digvijay Singh

== Soundtrack ==
All songs are written by Hassan Kamal. The soundtrack is available on Polydor (now called Universal Music Group).

Song	Singer
"Jaanam Jaanam"	Kishore Kumar, Asha Bhosle
"Jai Mata Ki"	Asha Bhosle, Mohammed Aziz
"Jao Jao"	Asha Bhosle, Manhar Udhas
"Dhundti Hai"	Asha Bhosle, Manhar Udhas
"Hum To Tere Liye"	S. Janaki, Manhar Udhas
