= Srinatha Kavi Sarvabhoumudu =

1993 film by Bapu

- Theatrical release poster
- Directed by: Bapu
- Written by: Mullapudi Venkata Ramana (Screenplay & dialogues)
- Based on: Kavi Sarvabhoumudu and Kavidvayamu by Nori Narasimha Sastry
- Produced by: Nandamuri Rama Krishna
- Starring: N. T. Rama Rao; Jayasudha; Rajendra Prasad
- Cinematography: Nandamuri Mohana Krishna
- Edited by: Dasineni Subhash; P. Suryanarayana
- Music by: K. V. Mahadevan; Puhalendi
- Production company: Srimathi Movie Combines
- Release date: 21 October 1993
- Running time: 150 minutes
- Country: India
- Language: Telugu
- Budget: ₹3 crore

Srinatha Kavi Sarvabhoumudu (transl. Srinatha, the universal monarch of poets) is a 1993 Telugu-language biographical film directed by Bapu and written by Mullapudi Venkata Ramana. The film depicts the life of the 15th-century Telugu poet Srinatha and is based on the novels Kavi Sarvabhoumudu and Kavidvayamu by Nori Narasimha Sastry. Produced by Nandamuri Rama Krishna, the film stars N. T. Rama Rao in the title role, alongside Jayasudha, Kaikala Satyanarayana, Rajendra Prasad, Mikkilineni, and Gummadi in supporting roles. The music was composed by K. V. Mahadevan and Puhalendi.

Filming took place in locations including Rajahmundry, Polavaram, and Pattiseema along the Godavari River. The film was released in October 1993 but did not achieve commercial success. It was the final film featuring N. T. Rama Rao to release, although his last performance was in Major Chandrakanth (1993), which was released prior to this film.

== Plot ==
The film begins at the Kondaveedu court, where King Peda Komati Vema Reddi is instructed by Emperor Prouda Devaraya of Vidyanagaram to challenge his royal scholar, Gowda Dindima Bhattu, who has defeated poets throughout the kingdom. Poets who lose must bow before Bhattu, while those who win have the right to break his golden drum, a symbol of his heritage. To defend his kingdom's honour, Vema Reddi enlists the talented poet Srinatha, who swears an oath before the Kondaveedu family deity's sword, Nandikanta Potaraju Katari, and sets off on his mission.

Srinatha, a hedonistic poet who enjoys an extravagant life with his devoted wife Sridevi, begins his journey with stops for pilgrimage and flirtatious poetry. Along the way, he meets his brother-in-law Pothana, a natural poet, and invites him to join his lavish lifestyle. Pothana, however, declines, content with his simple life as a farmer.

During a stop in a village, a deceitful chieftain, Karanam Nagayya, attempts to embezzle funds allocated for Srinatha’s hospitality. When his scheme is exposed, Nagayya is punished, leading him to seek revenge. He incites Raja Vallabharaya, a subordinate of the emperor, against Srinatha. However, Vallabharaya, impressed by Srinatha’s intellect, becomes his admirer. Consequently, Srinatha mentions Vallabharaya in his works Kridabhinamam, Naladamayanthi, and Srungara Naishadham.

Srinatha eventually arrives at Vidyanagaram, where Dindima Bhattu and his disciples mock his literary skills. Seeking a fair challenge, Srinatha befriends royal ambassador Sarparaya Telunga, who arranges a competition at the emperor’s court. Srinatha defeats Dindima Bhattu, breaks the golden drum, and earns the title "Kavi Sarvabhouma" (Emperor of Poets). The scholarly committee acknowledges Srinatha's unique contributions to literature, awarding him gold for his excellence.

Meanwhile, Vema Reddi is betrayed by Singa Bhupaludu of Rachakonda, who seizes the imperial sword. Srinatha retrieves the sword through his literary talents but finds Kondaveedu in decline, with the prince, Chinna Vema Reddi, indulging in debauchery. Disillusioned, Srinatha abandons his wealth and status, choosing a humble life.

Over time, Srinatha becomes a wanderer, seeking patronage from various kings but finding none. He arrives in Palnadu and mocks its terrain, prompting Chennakesava to appear in the form of a child and inspire him to document their history in the Palanati Veeracharitra. Eventually, Srinatha settles in a village, where Nagayya, still seeking vengeance, subjects him to humiliation and torture. When Nagayya is overthrown by a public uprising, Srinatha, now weary of life, decides to end his own. Sridevi dies in his lap, and Srinatha takes his own life by drowning. The film concludes with Srinatha's spirit ascending to the heavens.

== Cast ==
- N. T. Rama Rao as Srinatha
- Jayasudha as Sridevi
- Satyanarayana as Gowda Dindima Bhattu
- Mikkilineni as Pedakomati Vema Reddi
- Gummadi as Singa Bhupaludu
- Rajendra Prasad as Raja Vallabharaya / Nala
- Rallapalli as Kanamam Nagayya
- A.V.S. as a Tamil poet
- Gundu Sudarshan as Ganapathi
- Bhavani Shankar as Pothana
- Raja as Yuvaraju
- Mallik Babu as Duggana
- Aamani as Damayanti
- Divyavani
- Sindhuja as Special appearance
- Disco Shanti in an item number

== Production ==
=== Early efforts ===
N. T. Rama Rao had a long-standing ambition to portray the celebrated Telugu poet Srinatha on screen. The idea first emerged in 1966 when Bharat Films produced Bhakta Pothana under the direction of G. Ramineedu. Rama Rao was initially approached to play Srinatha in the film. He expressed a strong commitment to the role, requesting six months to study Srinatha's life and immerse himself in the poet’s customs and lifestyle. Rama Rao also proposed shaving his head for authenticity and completing the film within two months after preparation. However, the filmmakers hesitated and suggested using a wig instead, leading Rama Rao to decline the role.

The idea of portraying Srinatha remained significant to Rama Rao throughout his career. In 1983, while serving as the chief minister of Andhra Pradesh, he planned to produce and direct a film on Srinatha. J. V. Raghavulu was enlisted as the music director, and C. Narayana Reddy was assigned to write the lyrics. Some songs were recorded during the early stages of production. However, political pressures and the central government's refusal to grant permission for him to act while holding office led to the project being postponed.

In December 1984, Rama Rao revived the project. Unhappy with the earlier compositions, he replaced J. V. Raghavulu with Pendyala Nageswara Rao as the music director and re-recorded the songs with singer V. Ramakrishna. Rama Rao emphasized his personal connection to the role by taking on the responsibilities of directing and producing the film, which was titled Srinatha Kavi Sarvabhoumudu. C. Narayana Reddy was tasked with writing the dialogues and lyrics. Despite his renewed commitment, the project faced further delays due to Rama Rao’s continued duties as chief minister, especially after his third term began in March 1985.

=== Revival and development ===
After seven years of delay, the project moved forward under the direction of Bapu. Rama Rao collaborated with Bapu and writer Mullapudi Venkata Ramana for the film. They expressed concerns, noting that Srinatha's life did not provide a large enough narrative to captivate audiences. They also highlighted the financial risks involved in producing a film about a historical figure who was relatively unknown to the masses. Despite these concerns, Rama Rao remained determined, emphasizing that the film should be made with sincerity. He believed that even if it did not achieve widespread commercial success, it would still resonate with a smaller, appreciative audience.

Following Rama Rao's insistence, the film was produced by his son, Nandamuri Rama Krishna, under the banner of Srimathi Movie Combines. Bapu directed the film, with Mullapudi Venkata Ramana providing the screenplay and dialogues. The story was based on the novels Kavi Sarvabhoumudu and Kavidvayamu by Nori Narasimha Sastry, which depict the life of Srinatha.

=== Filming ===
Principal photography took place in Rajahmundry, Polavaram, Pattiseema, and other locations along the Godavari River. The cinematography was handled by Nandamuri Mohana Krishna, son of Rama Rao. The production was completed on a budget of ₹3 crore.

While Srinatha Kavi Sarvabhoumudu was the last film featuring N. T. Rama Rao to release, it was not his final performance. His last acting role was in Major Chandrakanth (1993), which was filmed after Srinatha Kavi Sarvabhoumudu but released earlier.

AVS and Gundu Sudarshan were credited as debutants, though they had appeared in minor roles in earlier films.

== Music ==
Srinatha Kavi Sarvabhoumudu

Film score by K. V. Mahadevan
- Released: 1993
- Genre: Soundtrack
- Length: 62:06
- Label: Beats Audio
- Producer: K. V. Mahadevan

K. V. Mahadevan chronology
Swathi Kiranam (1992)	Srinatha Kavi Sarvabhoumudu (1993)	' ()

The film's music was composed by K. V. Mahadevan and Puhalendi, with lyrics penned by C. Narayana Reddy. The soundtrack was released under the Beats Audio label.

No.	Title	Singer(s)	Length
1.	"Jejelu Jejelu"	S. P. Sailaja	4:11
2.	"Naladamayanthi"	S. P. Balasubrahmanyam, P. Susheela	9:06
3.	"Hara Vilasam"	S. P. Balasubrahmanyam, P. Susheela	4:29
4.	"Abba Oho Yabba"	SP Sailaja	4:23
5.	"Pujarivari Kodalu (Padyam-1)"	S. P. Balasubrahmanyam	10:14
6.	"Tholakari (Padyam-2)"	S. P. Balasubrahmanyam	19:48
7.	"Kantikinidra Vachune (Padyam-3)"	S. P. Balasubrahmanyam	6:38
8.	"NTR Dialogues"	NTR	3:17
Total length:			62:06

== Reception ==
The film was released on 21 October 1993 and was a commercial failure.

Devaraju Ravi reviewed the film, calling it a masterpiece. He praised Bapu's direction, N. T. Rama Rao's performance, the dialogues, lyrics, and cinematography. He recommended that every Telugu person watch the film and urged the government to make it tax-free.
