= Sampoorna Ramayanam (1972 film) =

- Poster
- Directed by: Bapu
- Written by: Mullapudi Venkata Ramana [dialogues] & Arudra [dialogues]
- Based on: Ramayana by Valmiki
- Produced by: Nidamarthi Padmakshi
- Starring: Shobhan Babu; Chandrakala; Gummadi; V. Nagayya; Kaikala Satyanarayana; S.V.Ranga Rao; Mikkilineni; Jamuna; Chhaya Devi; Hemalatha; Pandari Bai
- Cinematography: K. S. Prasad
- Music by: K. V. Mahadevan
- Production company: Durga Cinetone
- Distributed by: Lakshmi Films
- Release date: 16 March 1972
- Country: India
- Language: Telugu

Sampoorna Ramayanam (transl. The Complete Ramayana) is a 1972 Indian Telugu-language Hindu mythological film directed by Bapu. It is based on Valmiki's Ramayana. The film was a commercial success.

== Plot ==
The story is the complete Ramayana from the birth of Rama to his coronation after completing his exile.

== Cast ==
- Shobhan Babu as Rama
- Nagaraju as Lakshmana
- Chandrakala as Sita
- S. V. Ranga Rao as Ravana
- Arja Janardhana Rao as Anjaneya and Guha
- Chandra Mohan as Bharatha
- Gummadi as Dasaratha
- V. Nagayya as Vasishtha
- Kaikala Satyanarayana as Meghanadha
- Krishna Kumari as Mandodari
- Mikkilineni as Janaka
- Jamuna as Kaika
- Sriranjani Jr. as Sumitra
- Chhaya Devi as Mandhara
- Dhulipala as Vibhishana
- Madhavapeddi Satyam as Vishwamitra
- Mukkamala as Parashurama
- Pemmasani Ramakrishna as Angada
- Hemalatha as Kousalya
- Pandari Bai as Shabari
- Chalapathi Rao as Vayu
- Anand Mohan as Akshayakumara
- Jayakumari as Surpanakha

  Surpanakha

== Soundtrack ==
- "Adigo Ramayya"
- "Choosindhi Ninnu Choosindhi" (Singer: P. Susheela)
- "Evadu Ninnu Minchu Vaadu"
- "Kunukontini Etc" - P. Susheela, Ghantasala
- "Oorike Kolanu Neeru Uliki Uliki Padutundhi" (Lyrics: Devulapalli Krishnasastri; Singer: P. Susheela)
- "Rama Laali Meghasyama Laali" (Singer: P. Susheela)
- "Ramaya Tandri O Ramaya Tandri.. Maa Nomulanni Pandinayi Ramaya Tandri" (Lyrics: Kosaraju Raghavaiah; Singer: Ghantasala)
- "Vana Jallu Kurisindhi Lera Lera Ollu Jhallu Jhallandi Rara Rara" (Singer: Jikki Krishnaveni)
- "Vedalenu Kodandapani" (three parts) (Singers: P. B. Srinivas and P. Susheela)

== Box-office ==
The film ran for more than 100 days in 10 theaters in Andhra Pradesh.
