= Paramaatma =

- Promotional Poster
- Directed by: Bapu
- Starring: Mithun Chakraborty; Juhi Chawla; Amrish Puri
- Music by: Bappi Lahiri
- Release date: 15 April 1994
- Running time: 140 minutes
- Country: India
- Language: Hindi

Paramaatma is a 1994 Indian Hindi-language drama film directed by Bapu, starring Mithun Chakraborty (in Double Role), Juhi Chawla, Amrish Puri in pivotal roles. The film was released under the Banner of Shri Siddhi Vinayaka International. It is a remake of Bapu's 1969 Telugu film Buddhimantudu.

== Plot ==
The film is about an honest person who finds happiness in spiritual life and goes up against his atheist brother who rejects religion. Mithun Chakraborty plays a double role as both brothers.

== Cast ==
- Mithun Chakraborty as Madhavacharya / Gopal "Chhotu" (Double Role)
- Juhi Chawla as Rajni
- Reema Lagoo as Madhavacharya's Wife
- Amrish Puri as Chaudhary Rudranarayan
- Harish Patel as Munshi
- Anjana Mumtaz as Thakurain
- Sushmita Mukherjee as Meenakshi
- Shammi as Rudranarayan's Wife
- Raja Bundela as Bhagwan Shri Kishan / Kanhaiya / Murli Manohar
- Vikas Anand as District Education Officer

== Songs ==
The songs were composed by Bappi Lahiri.

1. "Jai Radhe Radhe Krishna Krishna" (Female) – Kavita Krishnamurthy
2. "Jai Radhe Radhe Krishna Krishna" (Male) – S. P. Balasubrahmanyam
3. "Bhagwan Ka Yeh Mandir" – S. P. Balasubrahmanyam, Mohammed Aziz
4. "Swarg Mein Milegi" – Kumar Sanu
5. "Tune Mera Dil Chhua" – Kumar Sanu, Alka Yagnik
6. "Tu Tu Turu" – Alka Yagnik
7. "Ta Ta Tata" – Sudesh Bhosle
8. "Margorita" – Bali Brahmbhatt
