= Radha Gopalam =

- Directed by: Bapu
- Written by: Mullapudi Venkata Ramana
- Produced by: Anil Kumar Koneru
- Starring: Srikanth; Sneha; Sunil Sharma; Brahmanandam; Sunil; Venu Madhav; Jayalalitha
- Cinematography: P. R. K. Raju
- Music by: Mani Sharma
- Distributed by: Anjana Productions
- Release date: 23 February 2005
- Country: India
- Language: Telugu

Radha Gopalam is a 2005 Indian Telugu-language film directed by Bapu and written by Ramana. It stars Srikanth and Sneha in lead roles. The music was composed by Mani Sharma and lyrics were penned by Veturi, Jonnavittula, Mullapudi Venkata Ramana. It is based on the Hollywood film Adam's Rib (1949). The performances of Srikanth and Sneha were critically applauded. The film won three Nandi Awards and was successful at the box office.

== Plot ==
Gopalam (Srikanth) performs tapas and gets Radha (Sneha) as his wife. Gopalam is an assistant public prosecutor. Radha is the daughter of Judge (Ranganath). She applies for a law degree after marriage and passes the exams with high honors. Radha is superior and more talented than Gopalam at work. This trait infuriates Gopalam and it causes a rift between him and Radha. The rest of the story is all about how they survive the ego tiff.

== Cast ==
- Srikanth as Gopalam
- Sneha as Radha
- Brahmanandam as Clerk
- Jayalalitha
- Sunil Sharma as Lord Krishna
- Sunil as Lakshmana Rao
- Ranganath as Judge (Radha's father)
- Rallapalli as Judge
- Lahari
- Dharmavarapu Subramanyam
- Venu Madhav as Raju
- Kondavalasa Lakshmana Rao
- Raavi Kondala Rao
- M. S. Narayana
- AVS
- L. B. Sriram
- Divyavani
- Sudarshan
- Rajyalakshmi as Radha's mother
- Saraawatamma
- IDPL Nirmala
- Lakshmi Reddy
- Kallu Chidambaram as Police officer
- Rajitha

== Music ==
The music was composed by Mani Sharma.

Track listing
No.	Title	Lyrics	Singer(s)	Length
1.	"Shatamanam Bhavathi"	Veturi Sundararama Murthy	S. P. Balasubrahmanyam, K. S. Chithra	4:34
2.	"Nee Valu Jada"	Jonnavittula Ramalingeswara Rao	S. P. Balasubrahmanyam, Sunitha Upadrashta	4:55
3.	"Agadalu Pagadalu"	Jonnavittula Ramalingeswara Rao	S. P. Balasubrahmanyam, Kalpana Raghavendar	4:41
4.	"Maa Muddu Radhamma"	Veturi Sundararama Murthy	S. P. Balasubrahmanyam, Sunitha Upadrashta	4:58
5.	"Tolikodi Koosindi"	Mullapudi Venkata Ramana	Muralidhar, K. S. Chithra	5:05
6.	"Grahanam Pattani"	Jonnavittula Ramalingeswara Rao	S. P. Balasubrahmanyam	3:08
Total length:				27:21

== Awards ==
Nandi Awards

- Best Cinematographer - P.R.K. Raju
- Best Choreographer - Srinivas
- Special Jury Award - Sneha
