= Sangeeta (Telugu actress) =

Indian actress

- Born: Warangal, India
- Other names: Mutyala Muggu Sangeeta; M.G.R Sangeeta
- Occupation: Actress
- Years active: 1975-present
- Spouse: Sundar Rajan

Sangeeta is an Indian actress who has predominantly worked in Telugu films, alongside Tamil, Kannada and Malayalam films. She has appeared with leading actors like Sivaji Ganesan, Rajinikanth, Kamal Haasan and Chiranjeevi. In the late 1990s she started appearing as a character artist. She has appeared in over 500 films in various south Indian languages.

== Early life ==
Sangeeta hails from Warangal. She debuted in 1975 with the Mutyala Muggu, though she shot for Teerpu before.

Sangeeta is married to Sundar Rajan.

== Notable filmography ==
This list is incomplete; you can help by expanding it.

=== Telugu ===
Year	Title	Role	Notes
1975	Mutyala Muggu		Debut in Telugu
1975	Teerpu		
1976	Andharu Bagundali	Geetha	
1976	Peddannayya		
1977	Chilakamma Cheppindi		
1977	Manushulu Chesina Dongalu		
1977	Manishilo Manishi		
1978	Sri Rama Pattabhishekam	Goddess Sita	
1978	Yetthuku Pai Yetthu		
1979	Rathi Manmadha		
1979	Tayaramma Bangarayya	Vani	
1979	Sri Tirupati Venkateswara Kalyanam		
1979	Maha Shakti	Mahadevi	
1980	Sannayi Appanna		
1980	Nakili Manishi		
1980	Bhale Krishnudu		
1980	Kodalu Vastunaru Jagratha		
1980	Badai Basavayya	Kantham	
1980	Bangaru Lakshmi		
1981	Prema Natakam		
1981	Tyagayya		
1981	Jatagadu		
1982	Intlo Ramayya Veedhilo Krishnayya		
1982	Bangaru Bhoomi	Rajyalakshmi and Susheela	
1982	Pelleedu Pillalu	Durga	
1982	Kadali Vachina Kanakadurga		
1982	Griha Pravesham		
1983	Ramarajyamlo Bheemaraju		
1983	Khaidi	Sooryam's Elder Sister	
1984	Mahanagaramlo Mayagadu		
1984	Srivariki Premalekha	Kamakshi	
1984	Aada Puli		
1984	Hero		
1985	Punnami Rathri	Annapurna	
1985	Maya Mohini		
1985	Sri Katna Leelalu	Rani	
1986	Seetharama Kalyanam		
1986	Kashmora	Sharada	
1986	Karu Diddina Kapuram		
1987	Lawyer Suhasini		
1987	Sthree Sahasam	Jyothi	
1988	Raktabhishekam		
1989	Rajakeeya Chadarangam		
1989	Ayyappa Swamy Mahatyam		
1990	Jagadeka Veerudu Atiloka Sundari	Teacher	
1990	Muddula Menalludu		
1991	Sathruvu		
1993	Allari Alludu		
1994	Aame	Ooha's Mother	
1994	Ammayi Kapuram		
1994	Bobbili Simham		
1994	Gharana Alludu	Sharada	
1994	Raithu Bharatam		
1994	Jailor Gari Abbayi		
1994	Bhairava Dweepam	Padma's Mother	
1994	Pelli Koduku		
1994	Hello Brother	Geetha	
1995	Raja Simham		
1995	Subhamastu		
1995	Patha Basti		
1996	Sarada Bullodu		
1996	Family		
1996	Pittala Dora		
1996	Soggadi Pellam		
1997	Gokulamlo Seeta		
1997	Bobbili Dora		
1997	Panjaram		
1997	Adirindi Guru		
1997	Osi Naa Maradala		
1998	Manasichi Choodu		
1998	Tholi Prema	Balu's Mother	
1998	Manasichi Choodu		
1999	Manasulo Maata		
2000	Badri		
2000	Adavi Chukka		
2000	Ninne Premistha		
2000	Chiru Navvutho		
2001	Nuvvu Nenu		
2001	Prema Sandadi		
2001	Chinna		
2001	Jai Ganesh Deva		
2001	Snehamante Idera		
2002	Idiot		
2002	Seema Simham		
2002	Lagna Patrika		
2002	Nee Sneham		
2002	Aadi		
2003	Simhadri		
2003	Sivamani		
2003	Anaganaga O Kurraadu		
2003	Dil		
2004	Cheppave Chirugali		
2004	Varsham		
2004	Swetha Naagu		
2005	Aunanna Kadanna		
2005	Nuvvante Naakishtam		
2005	Ayyenda Leda		
2006	Seethakoka Chiluka		
2008	Sundarakanda		
2009	Ek Niranjan		
2010	Pappu		
2013	Sevakudu		
2019	Sita		
2019	Tholu Bommalata		
2020	Pressure Cooker		

=== Tamil ===
Year	Title	Role	Notes
1976	Anna Nee En Deivam		Unreleased; Debut in Tamil
1977	Aadu Puli Attam		
1977	Dheepam		
1977	Thanikudithanam		
1978	Panchamirdham		
1978	Punniya Boomi		
1979	Aadu Pambe		
1979	Aarilirunthu Arubathu Varai		
1979	Mahalakshmi		
1979	Pancha Boodham		
1979	Nenjukku Needhi		
1980	Bombay Mail 109		
1980	Muzhu Nilavu		
1981	Kadavulin Theerpu		
1981	Mangala Lakshmi		
1983	Villiyanur Matha		
1984	Ambigai Neril Vanthaal	Radha's Sister	
1984	Uravai Kaatha Kili		
1984	Oh Maane Maane		
1985	Un Kannil Neer Vazhindal		
1986	Oomai Vizhigal		
1986	Uyire Unakkaga	Asha Devi	
1986	Uthami		
1987	Per Sollum Pillai		
1987	Anbulla Appa		
1988	Poovukkul Boogambam		Guest appearance
1990	Avasara Police 100	Seetha	
1990	Aarathi Edungadi		
1990	Vaigasi Poranthachu	Ranjitha's Mother	
1990	Nanbargal	Priya's Mother	
1990	Vazhndhu Kattuvom		
1992	Bramachari		
1992	Unnai Vaazhthi Paadugiren	Priya's Mother	
1992	Innisai Mazhai	Michael's Mother	
1992	Bharathan	Janaki	
1992	Unakkaga Piranthen		
1992	David Uncle	Selvi's Mother	
1992	Thevar Veetu Ponnu	Sangari and Savithri's Mother	
1992	Neenga Nalla Irukkanum		
1992	Chinna Pasanga Naanga		
1993	Uzhaippali		
1993	Prathap		
1993	Aathma	Saravanan's mother	
1994	En Rajangam	Suresh's mother	
1994	Jallikattu Kaalai	Radha's mother	
1994	Mettupatti Mirasu	Valliammai	
1994	Pudhusa Pootha Rosa		
1995	Manathile Oru Paattu		
1995	Mogamul		
1995	Raja Pandi		
1995	Thirumoorthy	Lakshmi	
1995	Chinna Mani		
1995	Ragasiya Police	Suriya's Mother	
1995	Marumagan		
1995	Murai Maman	Saratha	
1996	Vetri Vinayagar	Asirikai	
1997	Thaali Pudhusu	Lakshmi	
1997	Periya Thambi	Sivagami	
1998	Golmaal	Aishwarya's Mother	
2000	Priyamaanavale	Priya's Mother	
2004	Madhumathi		
2006	Sudesi		
2008	Pirivom Santhippom	Deivanai	

=== Kannada ===
Year	Title	Role	Notes
1982	Nyaya Ellide		Debut in Kannada
1984	Pavitra Prema		
1984	Khaidhi		
1988	Shiva Mecchida Kannappa		
1988	Nee Nanna Daiva	Rohini	
1989	Gajapathi Garvabhanga		
1997	Mahabharatha		
2000	Yare Nee Abhimani		

=== Malayalam ===
Year	Title	Role	Notes
1976	Samasya		Debut in Malayalam
1984	Kadamattathachan		
1985	Uyirthezhunnelppu		
1991	Kadinjool Kalyanam	Pothuval's Wife	
1991	Neelagiri	Ani's Mother	
1991	Uncle Bun	Saramma James	
1991	Chanchattam		

=== Odia ===
Year	Title	Role	Notes
1978	Sankha Mahuri		

== Television ==
- Vasantham (SUN TV) - Tamil (2010-2011) - Sakthi
