= Mister Pellam =

- DVD cover
- Directed by: Bapu
- Written by: Mullapudi Venkata Ramana (Story, screenplay & dialogues)
- Produced by: Gawara Partha Sarathi
- Starring: Rajendra Prasad; Aamani
- Cinematography: P. R. K. Raju
- Edited by: K. N. Raju
- Music by: M. M. Keeravani
- Production company: Sri Chamundi Chitra
- Release date: 5 September 1993
- Running time: 129 mins
- Country: India
- Language: Telugu

Mister Pellam (transl. 'Mr. Wife') is a 1993 Telugu-language drama film directed by Bapu and written by Mullapudi Venkata Ramana. The film stars Rajendra Prasad and Aamani, with music composed by M. M. Keeravani. It is Inspired by the 1983 film Mr. Mom.

The film was critically acclaimed and was a commercial success. It won the National Film Award for Best Telugu Feature Film, and six Nandi Awards, including Best Feature Film - Gold and Best Actress for Aamani.

== Plot ==
The film begins in Vaikuntha, where Narada creates a rift between Vishnu and Lakshmi over the superiority of men and women, leading to a clash between them. The story shifts to Earth, where Balaji, a bank employee, lives with his caring wife, Jhansi, and their two children. Jhansi is overwhelmed by household chores, while Balaji, having recently been promoted to head cashier, dismisses her efforts. This causes tension between the couple, and Lakshmi becomes upset with Balaji's attitude.

Balaji celebrates his promotion, but soon after, he is falsely accused of stealing ₹1,00,000 by the cunning manager, leading to his suspension. Demoralized, Balaji struggles to find a new job due to his tarnished reputation, while Jhansi decides to work despite Balaji's initial objection. She joins Annapurna Foods, where her former classmate, Gopala Krishna, is the managing director. Jhansi impresses the board with her ideas and is hired as vice president, with a monthly salary of ₹10,000, though she only tells Balaji she earns ₹3,000 to avoid upsetting him.

Meanwhile, Balaji challenges Jhansi to manage the household, believing it to be an easy task. However, he struggles with the demands of caring for the children, cooking, and handling everyday chores. A telephone connection is installed at their house for Jhansi's job, but it is frequently misused by their neighbors. Distracted by this, Balaji neglects his responsibilities, prompting Jhansi to reprimand him.

On the occasion of Krishnashtami, Gopala Krishna invites the family to his farmhouse. During the visit, Balaji loses his temper and accuses Jhansi of deliberately undermining him. Frustrated, Jhansi refuses to pay the television installment, resulting in the service being disconnected. These events lead to growing ego clashes and confrontations between the couple. Despite the tension, Jhansi excels at her job, earning a significant bonus for boosting sales. She also takes a loan from Gopala Krishna to help resolve their financial troubles.

She lends ₹1,00,000 to Balaji, asking him to deposit it in the bank. However, Balaji, feeling humiliated, refuses and quits his job. The couple's arguments escalate, and their children run away from home, witnessing their constant quarrels. Eventually, Balaji uncovers the manager's deceitful plan and confronts him. With the help of Gopala Krishna, Jhansi calls the bank chairperson and executes a plan to resolve the issue. The couple realizes their children are missing and rescues them from danger. The manager is apprehended, and Balaji returns to his job, acknowledging Jhansi's strength and support. In the end, Vishnu and Lakshmi reconcile in Vaikuntha, and the couple's relationship is restored. The film concludes on a positive note, highlighting mutual respect and understanding between husband and wife.

== Cast ==
- Rajendra Prasad as Balaji / Lord Vishnu
- Aamani as Jhansi / Lakshmi Goddess
- A.V.S as Gopala Krishna
- Tanikella Bharani as Bank Manager
- Gundu Sudarshan as Narasaya / Narada
- Dharmavarapu Subrahmanyam
- Jenny
- Master Uday
- Baby Anuradha

== Music ==
Mister Pellam

Film score by M. M. Keeravani
- Released: 1993
- Genre: Soundtrack
- Length: 19:41
- Label: AKASH Audio
- Producer: M. M. Keeravani

M. M. Keeravani chronology
Matru Devo Bhava (1993)	Mister Pellam (1993)	Abbayigaru (1993)

Music was composed by M. M. Keeravani. Audio soundtrack was released on Akash Audio Company label.

No.	Title	Lyrics	Singer(s)	Length
1.	"Adagavayya Ayyagari"	Arudra	S. P. Balasubrahmanyam, Chitra	3:46
2.	"Raade Cheli"	Veturi	Chitra	3:14
3.	"Mayadari Krishnayya"	Arudra	S. P. Balasubrahmanyam	4:27
4.	"Sogasu Chooda Tharama"	Veturi	S. P. Balasubrahmanyam, Chitra	4:25
5.	"Mullu Poyyi Katti Vachche"	Veturi	S. P. Balasubrahmanyam	3:09
Total length:				19:41

== Awards ==
National Film Awards

- Best Feature Film in Telugu

Nandi Awards - 1993

- Best Feature Film - Gold - G. Parthasaradhy
- Best Actress - Aamani
- Best Male Playback Singer - S. P. Balasubrahmanyam
- Second Best Story Writer - Mullapudi Venkata Ramana
- Best Makeup Artist - Nageswara Rao
- Special Jury Award - A.V.S
