= Buddhimantudu =

- Theatrical release poster
- Directed by: Bapu
- Screenplay by: Bapu
- Story by: Mullapudi Venkata Ramana
- Produced by: N. S. Murthy
- Starring: Akkineni Nageswara Rao; Vijaya Nirmala; Sobhan Babu; Krishnam Raju
- Cinematography: S. Venkataratnam
- Edited by: A. Sanjeevi
- Music by: K. V. Mahadevan
- Production company: Chitra Kalpana
- Release date: 20 September 1969
- Running time: 176 minutes
- Country: India
- Language: Telugu

Buddhimantudu (transl. intelligent Boy) is a 1969 Indian Telugu-language drama film directed by Bapu. It stars Akkineni Nageswara Rao, Vijaya Nirmala, Sobhan Babu and Krishnam Raju, with music composed by K. V. Mahadevan. The film was remade in Tamil as Manidhanum Dheivamagalam (1975) and in Hindi by the same director as Paramaatma (1994).

== Cast ==
- Akkineni Nageswara Rao as Madhavacharya and Gopi
- Vijaya Nirmala as Radha
- Sobhan Babu as Krishna
- Krishnam Raju as Krishna
- Gummadi as D.E.O.
- Nagabhushanam as Sheshadri
- Allu Ramalingaiah as Ramalingam
- Sakshi Ranga Rao as Achary
- Bhanu Prakash as Master
- Vijayachander as Gopi's friend
- Devadas Kanakala as Gopi's friend
- Suryakantham as Kanthamma
- Santha Kumari as Shantamma
- Rukmini as Kaveramma
- Meena Kumari as Meena
- Sandhya Rani as Kasthuri
- A. Sakunthala
- Chalapathi Rao
- Ranganath

== Soundtrack ==
Music composed by K. V. Mahadevan. The song "Badilo Emundhi" was considered by M. L. Narasimham of The Hindu to sum up the essence of the film.

Song title	Lyrics	Singers	length
"Bhoommeeda Sukhapadite"	Aarudhra	Ghantasala	4:20
"Havvare Havva"	Aarudhra	Ghantasala	4:41
"Tata Veedukolu"	Aarudhra	Ghantasala	4:20
"Guttameeda Guvva Koosindi"	Aarudhra	Ghantasala, P. Susheela	4:39
"Allari Pedatare Pilla"	Kosaraju	Pithapuram, Swarnalata	3:00
"Thotaloki Raakura"	Dasaradhi	P. Susheela	3:42
"Nanu Palimpagaa"	Dasaradhi	Ghantasala	4:03
"Badilo Emundhi"	Kosaraju	Ghantasala	3:20
