= Pelleedu Pillalu =

- Directed by: Bapu
- Written by: Mullapudi Venkata Ramana (Dialogue)
- Story by: Mullapudi Venkata Ramana
- Produced by: D. Madhusudhana Rao
- Starring: Vijayashanti; Sumalatha; Suresh; Sarath Babu; Sangeetha; J. V. Somayajulu; Rama Prabha; Sai Chand
- Cinematography: Baba Azmi
- Edited by: G. R. Anil Dattatreya
- Music by: M. S. Viswanathan
- Production companies: Annapoorna Kalanikethan, Annapoorna Pictures
- Distributed by: Music World (India, VCD)
- Release date: 1982
- Language: Telugu

Pelleedu Pillalu (Telugu: పెళ్ళీడు పిల్లలు) is a Telugu-language drama film released in 1982 and directed by Bapu. Suresh and Vijayashanti play the leads in this film, with Sangeetha, Sarath Babu, Sumalatha and J. V. Somayajulu in the supporting cast. M. S. Viswanatham scored the music, while the lyrics were written by Sri Sri and Aathreya.

Actor Suresh was introduced to the Telugu screen through this film.

== Plot ==
On her deathbed, the sister of P. V. Rao (J. V. Somayajulu) entrusts to him the custody of her property along with daughters Durga (Sangeetha) and Shanti (Vijayashanti). After her death, he usurps the property and arranges Durga's marriage with a pauper Chalapati (Sarath Babu). After learning of the maternal uncle's intentions, Durga prepares and sells household items along with Shanti for livelihood. Learning that Rao's son (Suresh) is her cousin, Shanti starts teasing him along with her friend Annapoorna (Sumalatha). After learning their relation, he too starts liking Shanti. Upon hearing about Shanti and his son, Rao accuses the sisters of usurping his property through his son. This enrages Durga, who starts an eatery in front of her uncle's hotel and develops it into a hotel to pull down his business. Rao is bedridden with his business going down. Meanwhile, Durga fixes Shanti's wedding with Chandram (Sai Chand), Ananapoorna's love interest. When Shanti learns of this, she informs Rao about her intent to wed his son and requests his help in this matter. Reformed, Rao assures her of this and instructs Shanti to follow her sister. On the wedding day, with help of Chalapati, Annapurna and her mother (Rama Prabha), Rao arranges the wedding of Shanti with his son and that of Annapoorna with Chandram. Durga gets angered at the turn of events. The story ends on a happy note with everyone present explaining the situation to Durga.

== Cast ==
- Suresh as Ramesh
- Vijayshanti as Santhi
- Sai Chand as Chandram
- Sumalatha as Annapoorna "Poorna"
- Sangeetha as Durga
- Sarath Babu as Chalapati, Durga's husband
- J. V. Somayajulu as P. B. Rao(Phani Bhushan Rao)
- Rama Prabha as Annapoorna's mother
- Suryakantam
- Potti Prasad

== Crew ==
- Director – Bapu
- Story – Mullapudi Venkata Ramana
- Dialogue – Mullapudi Venkata Ramana
- Producer – D. Madhusudhana Rao
- Production Company – Annapoorna Kalanikethan, Annapoorna Pictures
- Cinematographer – Baba Azmi
- Editor – G. R. Anil Dattatreya
- Choreographer – K. Tangappan

== Soundtrack ==
All music is composed by M. S. Viswanathan.

Songs
No.	Title	Lyrics	Singer(s)	Length
1.	"Padaharu Prayam"	Aathreya	S. P. Balasubrahmanyam, P. Susheela	4:20
2.	"Paruvapu Valapula Sangitam"	Sri Sri	P. Susheela	3:50
3.	"Vayase Velluvaga"	Sri Sri	S. P. Balasubrahmanyam, P. Susheela	4:20
