= Bangaru Pichika =

1968 Indian film

- Theatrical release poster
- Directed by: Bapu
- Written by: Mullapudi Venkata Ramana
- Story by: Mullapudi Venkata Ramana
- Produced by: Kommana Narayana Rao
- Starring: Chandra Mohan; Vijaya Nirmala Shantha Kumari
- Cinematography: Kannappa
- Music by: K. V. Mahadevan
- Production company: Sri Ganesh Pictures
- Release date: 1968
- Country: India
- Language: Telugu

Bangaaru Pichuka (transl. Golden sparrow) is a 1968 Telugu-language comedy-drama film directed by Bapu, produced by Kommana Narayana Rao and written by Mullapudi Venkata Ramana. It stars Chandra Mohan and Vijaya Nirmala. The music was composed by K. V. Mahadevan. Bapu remade the film as Pelli Koduku in 1994 with Naresh and Divyavani.

== Plot ==
Chandra Mohan is the son of a rich mother (Shanta Kumari) and fun-loving father. His mother asks him to marry, but his father advises him to run away from home and enjoy life. His mother announces rewards for those who find him. He tries to escape all these people. A criminal gang which has an eye on his properties sends one of their female members (Vijaya Nirmala) to attract him. But she falls in love with him. The remaining story is about how they both escape the criminal gang and unite.

== Cast ==
- Chandra Mohan
- Vijaya Nirmala
- Shantha Kumari
- Raja Babu
- Vinnakota Ramanna Pantulu
- Sakshi Ranga Rao
- Sivarama Krishnaiah (Guest)
- Jagga Rao (Guest)

== Soundtrack ==
All the songs were written by Arudra.

- "Emi Chesukunedi"
- "Manase Gani"
- "Oho Bangaaru"
- "Oho Nidura"
