= Nandi Award for Best Story Writer =

Indian film award

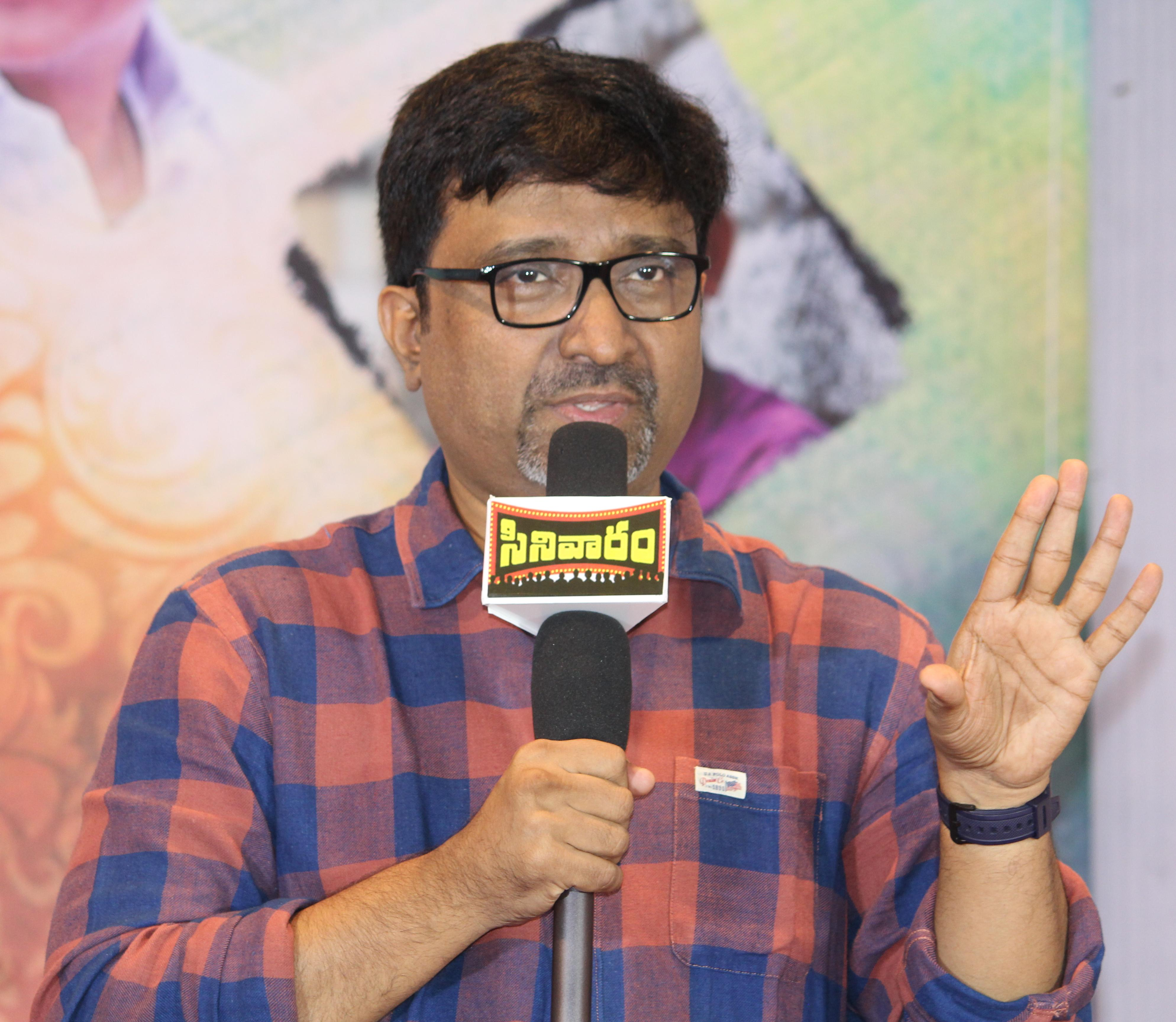
Mohana Krishna Indraganti won in 2013

The Nandi Award for Best Story Writer was commissioned in 1965. This is a list of the recipients of the award over the years and the films they have won for.

Year	Writer	Film
2016	Koratala Siva	Janatha Garage
2015	Krish Jagarlamudi	Kanche
2014	Krishna Vamsi	Govindudu Andarivadele
2013	Mohanakrishna Indraganti	Anthaka Mundu Aa Tarvatha
2012	Ayodhya Kumar	Minugurulu
2011	Raj Madiraju	Rushi
2010	R. P. Patnaik	Broker
2009	Sekhar Kammula	Leader
2008	R. P. Patnaik	Andamaina Manasulo
2007	Balabhadrapatruni Ramani	Madhumasam
2006	Ravi C. Kumar	Samanyudu
2005	T. Prabhakar	Meenakshi
2004	Ravi Chavali	The End
2003	Chandra Sekhar Yeleti	Aithe
2002	PV Shanti	Manasunte Chaalu
2001	Puri Jagannadh	Itlu Sravani Subramanyam
2000	Tirupathi Swamy	Azad
1999	Deenaraj, Udayasankar	Kalisundam Raa
1998	Dasari Narayana Rao	Kante Koothurne Kanu
1997	Olga	Thodu
1996	Nagesh Dharak	Maa Inti Aadapaduchu
1995	M. V. S. Haranatha Rao	Ammayi Kapuram
1994	Dasari Narayana Rao	Nanna Garu
1993	Paruchuri Brothers; Mullapudi Venkata Ramana	Aasayam; Mister Pellam
1992	Challa Subrahmanyam; Suresh Krishna	Ragulutunna Bharatam; Vasundhara
1991	Raavi Kondala Rao; Kalipatnam Ramarao	Pelli Pusthakam; Yagnam
1990	Paruchuri Brothers; K. Ranga Rao	Karthavyam; Udhayam
1989	Mani Ratnam; Shyam Prasad Reddy	Geethanjali; Ankusam
1988	Gollapudi Maruthi Rao; Visu	Kallu; Aadade Adharam
1987	Jandhyala; G. M. Kumar	Padamati Sandhya Ragam; Muvva Gopaludu
1986	Visu; Paruchuri Brothers	Samsaram Oka Chadarangam; Pratidwani
1985	T. Krishna; Usha kiran Movies Unit	Pratighatana; Mayuri
1984	Yaddanapudi Sulochana Rani	Kanchana Ganga
1983	Palagummi Padmaraju & R.K. Dharma Raju; K. S. Chandra Murthy	Bahudoorapu Batasari; Ananda Bhairavi
1982	K. Viswanath; M. Prabhakar Reddy	Subhalekha; Gruha Pravesam
1981	Late Gopichand; Mannava Balayya	Dharma Vaddi; Oorukichchina Maata
1980	Bharat; Madala Ranga Rao	Sangam Marali; Yuvatharam Kadilindi
1979	Dharma Vijayam; K. Viswanath	Punadhirallu; Sankarabharanam
1978	Mandha Venkataramana Rao; Ganesh Patro	Chali Cheemalu; Naalaaga Endaro
1977	Madhireddy Sulochana	Tharam Marindi
1976	B. N. Reddy & A. Raja Rajeswari; V. Mahesh	Pelli Kani Pelli; Manushulanta Okkate
1975	K. Rama Lakshmi; Y. Sarojini Devi	Jeevana Jyothi; Maa Voori Ranga
1974	N. T. Rama Rao; B. Bhaskar	Tatamma Kala; Manushulu Matti Bommalu
1973	Dasari Narayana Rao; Mullapudi Venkata Ramana	Samsaram Sagaram; Andala Ramudu
1969	Mullapudi Venkata Ramana; K. Pratyagatma	Kathanayakudu; Aadarsa Kutumbam
1968	K. S. Prakash Rao; Rajasri	Bandipotu Dongalu; Bangaru Gaajulu
1967	D. V. Narasa Raju; Mullapudi Venkata Ramana	Chadarangam; Poola Rangadu
1966	Palagummi Padmaraju	Rangula Ratnam
1965	Gollapudi Maruthi Rao & Yaddanapudi Sulochana Rani; Javar Seetharaman	Aatma Gowravam; Antastulu
