= Andala Ramudu (1973 film) =

- Theatrical release poster
- Directed by: Bapu
- Written by: Mullapudi Venkata Ramana (story / dialogues)
- Screenplay by: Seetaramudu; Boodlumandi
- Produced by: N. S. Murthy
- Starring: Akkineni Nageswara Rao; Latha
- Cinematography: V. S. R. Swamy
- Edited by: Akkineni Sanjeeva Rao; Mandapati Ramachandrayya
- Music by: K. V. Mahadevan
- Production company: Chitra Kalpana
- Release date: 12 September 1973
- Running time: 170 minutes
- Country: India
- Language: Telugu

Andala Ramudu is a 1973 Telugu-language comedy drama film, produced by N. S. Murthy under the Chitra Kalpana banner and directed by Bapu. It stars Akkineni Nageswara Rao, Latha and music composed by K. V. Mahadevan. The film is based on Mullapudi Venkata Ramana's Janata Express (novel). The film is the debut to veteran artists Nutan Prasad and Latha. The film won two Nandi Awards. The film has given enthusiastically drawing atmosphere and spirit to the movie Godavari (2006), directed by Sekhar Kammula.

== Cast ==
- Akkineni Nageswara Rao as Seetarama Rao / Ramu
- Latha as Seeta
- Nagabhushanam as J. B. Rao
- Allu Ramalingaiah as Teesesina Tahasildaru / Teeta / Ramalingaiah
- Raja Babu as Appula Appa Rao
- Dhulipala as Secretary
- Mukkamala (guest appearance)
- Mada as Sarangu
- Sakshi Ranga Rao as Subba Rao Mamagaru
- Raavi Kondala Rao as Dasu
- Nutan Prasad as Giri Babu
- Kakarala as Bantrothu Bhadrayya
- Venkateswara Rao
- K. K. Sarma as Priest
- Potti Prasad as Butler
- Suryakantham as Samalamma
- Radha Kumari
- Manimala as Rani
- Jhansi as Balanagamma
- Master Visweswara Rao

== Music ==
Andala Ramudu

Film score by K. V. Mahadevan
- Released: 1973
- Genre: Soundtrack
- Length: 49:22
- Producer: K. V. Mahadevan

Music was composed by K. V. Mahadevan. Music released on Audio Company.

S. No	Song title	Lyrics	Singers	length
1	"Paluke Bangaramayera"	Aarudhra	M. Balamuralikrishna, Madhavapeddi Satyam	4:10
2	"Edagadanikendukura"	Aarudhra	V. Ramakrishna	4:26
3	"Abbosi Chinnamma"	Aarudhra	V. Ramakrishna, P. Susheela	4:21
4	"Maa Thalli Godavari"	Kancherla Gopanna	V. Ramakrishna, J. V. Raghavulu	8:38
5	"Chakirevu Baana Emandi"	Aarudhra	V. Ramakrishna, J. V. Raghavulu	2:04
6	"Ramudemannadoi"	Aarudhra	V. Ramakrishna	5:02
7	"Bhajana Chese Vidhamu"	Kosaraju	V. Ramakrishna, Vijayalakshmi	4:18
8	"Kurise Vennello"	C. Narayana Reddy	V. Ramakrishna, P. Susheela	4:20
9	"Mamu Brovamani Cheppave"	C. Narayana Reddy	V. Ramakrishna	4:19
10	"Shudha Brahma"	Kancherla Gopanna	V. Ramakrishna	1:39
11	"Samooha Bhojanammu"	Kosaraju	V. Ramakrishna	4:08
12	"Adigo Bhadradri"	Kancherla Gopanna	V. Ramakrishna	1:00
13	"Sri Shankara"	Slokam	M. Balamuralikrishna	0:57

== Box office ==
The film ran for more than 100 days.

== Awards ==
Nandi Awards - 1973

- Second Best Feature Film - Silver - N. S. Murthy
- Second Best Story Writer - Mullapudi Venkata Ramana
