= Tyagayya (1981 film) =

- Directed by: Bapu
- Written by: Mullapudi Venkata Ramana
- Starring: J. V. Somayajulu; K.R. Vijaya
- Music by: K. V. Mahadevan
- Production company: Navata Arts
- Release date: 17 April 1981
- Running time: 143 minutes
- Country: India
- Language: Telugu

Tyagayya is a 1981 Indian Telugu-language film directed by Bapu. The cast included J.V. Somayajulu and K. R. Vijaya. The film is based on the life of Saint, Singer, and composer Tyagaraja. Tyagayya was showcased at the Indian Panorama of Filmotsav'82.

== Plot ==
Thyagaraja composed thousands of devotional compositions, most in Telugu and in praise of Lord Rama, many of which remain popular today, the most popular being "Nagumomu". Of special mention are five of his compositions called the Pancharatna Kritis (transl. "five gems"), which are often sung in programs in his honour, and Utsava Sampradaya Krithis (transl. Festive ritual compositions), which are often sung to accompany temple rituals.

== Cast ==
- J. V. Somayajulu as Tyagaraja
- K. R. Vijaya as Kamalamba
- Rao Gopal Rao as Japesam
- Ravi as Lord Rama
- Sangeetha as Goddess Seetha
- Arja Janardhana Raoas Hanuman
- Hemasundar as Lord Shiva
- Jhansi as Tyagayya's sister-in-law
- Sridhar
- Rallapalli
- Sakshi Ranga Rao
