= Xtra (film) =

Indian Telugu language adult romantic film

- DVD cover
- Directed by: Veeru K
- Written by: Veeru K M. V. S. Haranatha Rao (dialogues)
- Produced by: Ravi; Venu
- Starring: Ruthika; Santosh Pavan; Vadde Naveen
- Cinematography: Madhu A Naidu
- Edited by: Nagi Reddy
- Music by: Bapu–Ramana
- Production company: Sri Chitra
- Release date: 25 June 2004
- Country: India
- Language: Telugu

Xtra is a 2004 Indian Telugu language adult romantic film directed by Veeru K, produced by Ravi and Venu under 'Sri Chitra' banner. The film stars Ruthika as a Physical Director and Santosh Pavan as a college student with Vadde Naveen, Brahmanandam, Krishna Bhagavan, Sudhakar and others in supporting roles. Bapu and Ramana composed the film's score and soundtrack while the cinematography and editing are handled by Madhu A Naidu and Nagi Reddy respectively. The film became super hit running over 100 days in 6 centers.

== Plot ==
Nani (Santosh Pawan) is a wayward youth studying in a college. He gets secretly admired by his girl bestie, but she never confesses her love towards him. He befriends with his drunken Physical Director (Kondavalasa) and tries to evade sports and games. Frustrated by their actions, the college Principal (Jayalalitha) plans to appoint new lady trainer. Mythili (Ruthika Singh) a Hindu, joins Nani's college in the name of Nisha, a Christian, as a new Physical Director. Nani gets to know regarding Nisha's true name and religion, and he wants to unfold her conspiracy. He and his gang tries to drive her off from the college by proving her to be a Hindu, but Nani starts changing his attitude towards her. When his girl bestie reveals her love towards him, he belittles her, as he has a very low opinion towards love. Upon knowing his intentions girl bestie decides to end her life. Nisha saves her and promises her that she counsels Nani to change his mind towards love. She motivates Nani about love and it's importance in one's life. He slowly starts changing and accepts her mentorship. He gets trained by her in basketball and travels to his hometown for the tournament. He loses the championship in the tournament and tries to end his life as a result of it. Nisha saves him and counsels him for future victory. Overwhelmed by her beauty and character, Nani proposes to her, shattering the dreams of his girl bestie. Shocked by his behavior, Nisha treats his love towards her, like a child's infatuation towards his teacher. But Nani is adamant and still continues to harass her in the name of love. Going by the awkward developments in this student-teacher relationship, Nisha quits her job and reveals her real name as 'Mythili', a Hindu, to the college management and students. She embarks on a journey to actual Nisha's hometown and on her way she encounters Nani who tries to commit suicide by drinking poison, when she refuses his love again. Fed up with his actions and intentions, she accepts him with a condition that they should stay together for a month to test the compatibility, in Nisha's hometown 'Kalyanapalli' at Nisha's home. Nisha's family members treats the couple as brother and sister, instead of lovers, due to visible age gap. To Nani's surprise, Mythili's lover Prem (Vadde Naveen) visits the village, complicating the things for Nani. Prem, in turn convinces Mythili to accept Nani's proposal. He hatches a plan with village people (Brahmanandam, Krishna Bhagawan, Sudhakar and others), to make Nani realize his mistake. He then reveals to Nisha's family and the villagers, that Nisha committed suicide. She took her precious life by jumping off the building, just because Prem is in love with Mythili, and his unwillingness to share the same love with her. Mythili reveals her intentions to take Nisha's name and job was to support Nisha's family emotionally and monetarily. Upon knowing the truth from Prem about Nisha and Mythili's intentions behind the compatibility test, villagers get furious over Nani's obsession and adamant behavior. Unable to take villagers wrath, Nani halts his marriage and flees the function hall, leaving Mythili to Prem.

== Cast ==
- Ruthika as Mythili and Nisha (Physical Director)
- Santosh Pavan as Nani
- Vadde Naveen as Prem
- Jayalalita as Principal
- Pooja as Pooja
- Kondavalasa Lakshmana Rao as ex Physical Director
- Chalapati Rao as Nani's Father
- Suman Setty as Nani's Friend
- Surya as Postman
- Krishna Bhagavaan as Gas Company Apparao
- Suthi Velu as Police Constable
- Brahmanandam as 'Dubai Returned Businessman' Chinnarao
- Siva Reddy as Police Constable's Son
- Sudhakar as Army Major
- Rajitha as Hospital Nurse
- Sana as Major's Wife
- Lakshmipati as 'Appliance Supplier' Lakshmipati
- M. V. S. Haranatha Rao as Zamindar Dambikeswara Rao
- Chitram Basha as Tailor

== Soundtrack ==
The film's soundtrack comprised nine songs in total. The songs were composed by Bapu–Ramana. The film features three remixed songs: "Vangamaku" by Veturi from Driver Ramudu (1979), "Le Le Le Naaraja" from Prema Nagar (1971) and "Masaka Masaka" from Devudu Chesina Manushulu (1973) by Acharya Aatreya. Bapu-Ramana composed "Oo Le Le", a peppy number after getting inspired from "Aoura Laila" from the movie Veedevadandi Babu and "Chinnamma Chilakamma" bit composed by A. R. Rahman, from the movie Meenaxi: A Tale of Three Cities. The composer duo also used a devotional song "Nee Paadamula Nirathamu Nammithini" of Lord Venkateswara. The audio rights of this film were acquired by a private music label company 'XTRA Audio'.

Track Listing
No.	Title	Lyrics	Singer(s)	Length
1.	"Oo Le Le"	Sahithi	Durga, Chitram Basha	3:13
2.	"Arey Ekkadanincho"	Sahithi	Durga, Chitram Basha, Mithai Chitti and Chorus	4:11
3.	"Vangamaku"	Sagar, Veturi	Durga, Chitram Basha	1:21
4.	"Chirugaale"	Sahithi	Durga	4:08
5.	"Mythili"	Sahithi	Chitram Basha	0:55
6.	"Masaka Masaka"	Sagar, Acharya Aatreya	Durga and Chorus	2:33
7.	"Nee Paadamula"	Sai Krishna Yachendra	Chitram Basha	1:21
8.	"Le Le Naaraja"	Sagar, Acharya Aatreya	Durga and Chorus	2:10
9.	"Ra Ra Rammani"	Sahithi	Durga, Chitram Basha, Mithai Chitti and Chorus	4:16

== Reception ==
A critic from The Hindu wrote that "But what this film tells is that a girl who walks out from a person's life should patch up with him and a young man, who loves a girl older in age, should retract his steps". A critic from Idlebrain.com wrote that "This is an out-and-out adult film which is strictly recommended for desperate men who want to have fun". A critic from IANS wrote that "His [Veeru K's] latest Telugu presentation Xtra is a substandard offering".

== Box office ==
The film opened to houseful theatres. The film became Super-Hit, running over 100 days in 6 centers. After the film's positive reception, Veeru K announced a similar film titled Thrill (2006) also starring Ruthika. The film's success also helped Santosh Pawan securing a lead role in the movie Meghamala - O Pellam Gola (2005).

== Legacy ==
After the film's success, the comedy concept in the later half of the movie where Apparao, Major and Zamindar creates fun banter with Mangatayaaru and her husband Chinnarao at Mangatayaaru Tiffin Center were reused by the director E.V.V. Satyanarayana in the movie Athili Sattibabu LKG in the year 2007. Actor and dancer Abhinayashree played the role of Mangatayaaru, Lakshmipati as her sidekick and assistant Gaphoor and the hotel was named Mangatayaaru Tiffin Center inspired by the original. Later in 2008, director Venky (Kabaddi Kabaddi movie fame), made a whole new script titled Mangatayaaru Tiffin Center where the role of Mangatayaaru was played by Mumaith Khan.
