= Ruthika =

Indian actress

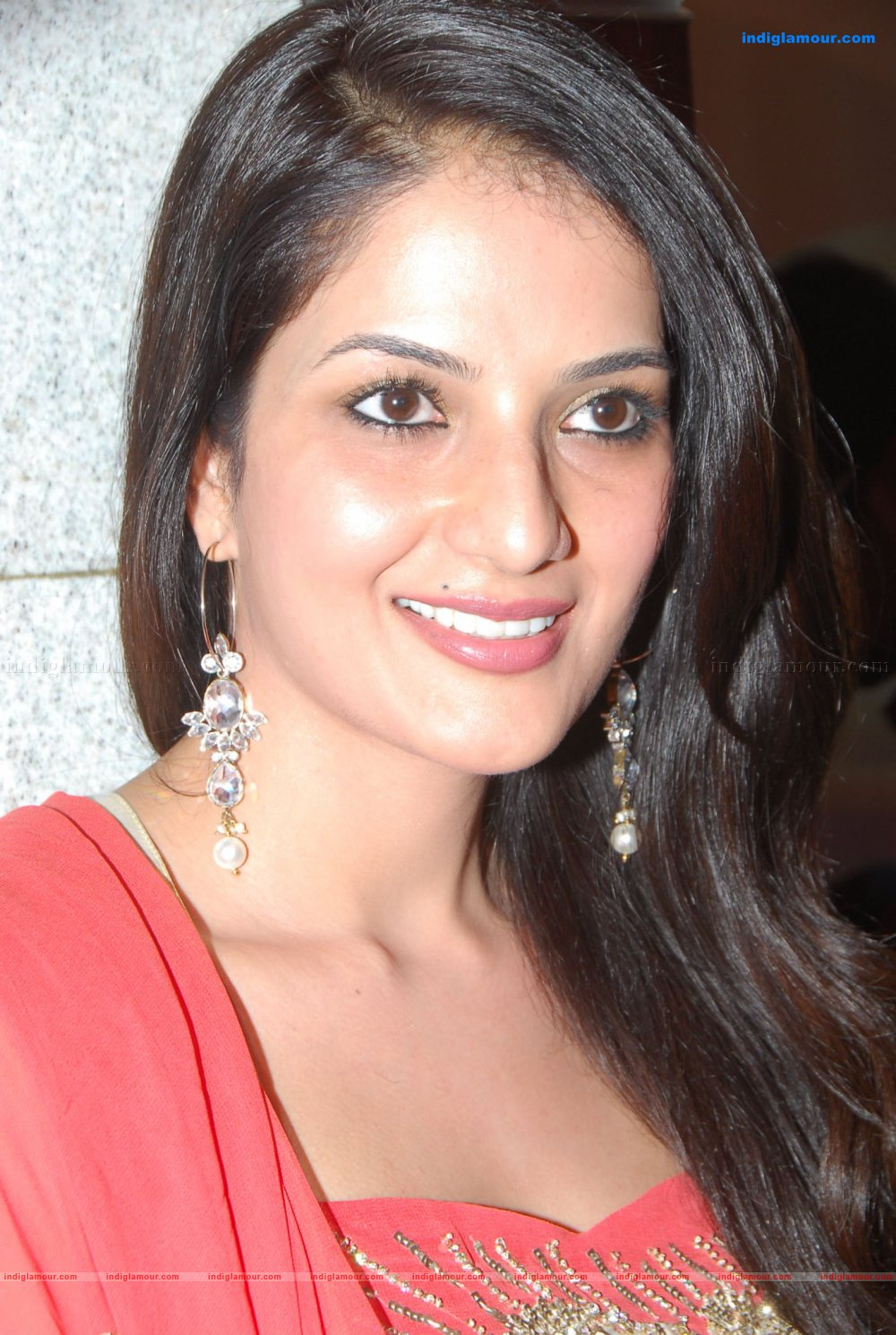
- Other names: Rutika, Rutika Singh
- Occupations: Actress, Model
- Years active: 1995–2010

Ruthika is an Indian film actress who has acted in multiple Indian languages but predominantly in Telugu films. She has also made her mark in Hindi, Kannada, Bengali and Malayalam films. She made her film debut as the lead actress under the name Rutika in the 1995 Bollywood movie Sarhad: The Border of Crime. Later, she went on to play both leading and supporting roles, along with special dance numbers in various movies. She played glamorous roles in most of her films like 6 Teens, Xtra, Thrill but she is also recognized for her acting prowess in the films like Tara, Vikramarkudu, Sarhad: The Border of Crime, Ananda and Dreams. She is sighted as the bold and beautiful actress down South for her glamour and oomph factor.

== Career ==
Ruthika played the lead roles in films such as 6 Teens (2001), Sorry Naaku Pellaindi (2004), and Xtra (2004). Regarding her performance in Xtra, a critic wrote that "Ruthika Singh is really hot and lived up to her reputation as the Tollywood's latest sex symbol". She played a sub-inspector in Vikramarkudu (2006) and went on to play supporting roles in many films.

== Filmography ==
=== Telugu ===
- 6 Teens (2001) as Ankita
- Tara (2001) as Tara's Mother
- Girl Friend (2002) as herself (Special Dance Number)
- Ela Cheppanu (2003) as herself (Special Dance Number)
- Oka Radha Iddaru Krishnula Pelli (2003) as a Pick-Pocketer (Special Dance Number)
- Sorry Naaku Pellaindi (2004) as Sarita
- Xtra (2004) as Mythili
- Rambha Neeku Oorvasi Naaku (2005) as TV Anchor Ruthika Rani
- Sarada Saradaga (2006) as Sundari
- Vikramarkudu (2006) as Sub-Inspector Razia
- Thrill (2006) as Pravallika
- Allare Allari (2007) as herself (Special Dance Number)
- Premabhishekam (2008) as Jayasudha
- John Appa Rao 40 Plus (2008) as Fashion Model (Special Dance Number)
- Blade Babji (2008) as Rani (Thief)
- Sorry Maa Aayana Intlo Unnadu (2010) as Priya
- Aha Naa Pellanta! (2011) as a Go-go dancer (cameo)

=== Kannada ===
- Friends (2002) as Ankita
- Dreams (2003) as Sneha
- Katthegalu Saar Katthegalu (2003) as Ramya
- Ananda (2003) as Aishwarya
- Laali Haadu (2003) as Geetha
- Nanna Hendti Maduve (2003) as Ramya
- Khushi (2003) as herself (Special Dance Number)
- Trin Trin (2004) as Rani
- Rakshasa (2005) as Mandakini
- Lava Kusha (2007) as Milkmaid Nimmi
- Navashakthi Vaibhava (2008) as Goddess Bhadrakali
- Jolly Days (2009) as Ruthika Madam (English Lecturer)

=== Hindi ===
- Sarhad: The Border of Crime (1995) as Jyothi
- Sanyasi Mera Naam (1999) as herself (Special Dance Number)
- Billa No. 786 (2000) as Pinky Singh
- Baghaawat – Ek Jung (2001) as Mary
- Khatron Ke Khiladi (2001) as Chhaila's love interest
- Arjun Devaa (2001) as Phoolmati

=== Malayalam ===
- Masmaram (1997) as Sherin
- Naalamkettile Nalla Thambimar (1996) as herself (Special Dance Number)

=== Bengali ===
- Nishana (2002)
