= Sakshi Ranga Rao =

Indian actor (1941/42–2005)

Saakshi Ranga Rao
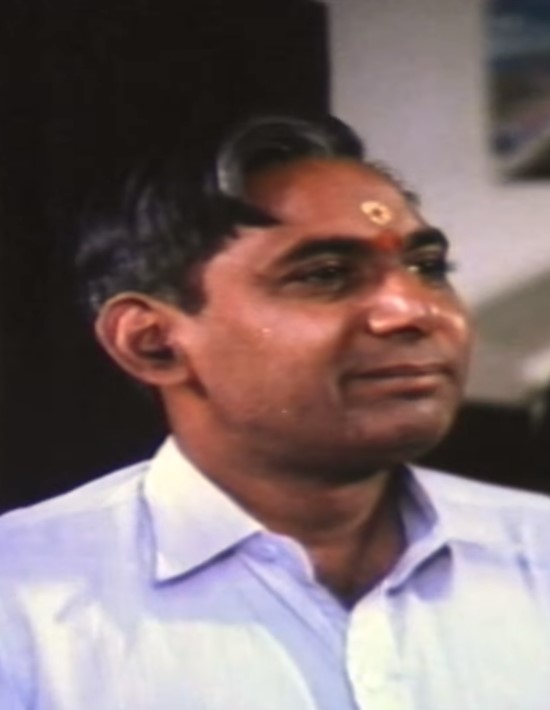
- Rao in a scene from Sirivennela (1986)
- Born: Rangavajhula Ranga Rao; 1941 or 1942; Kalavakuru, Madras Presidency, British India
- Died: 27 June 2005 (aged 63); Chennai, Tamil Nadu, India
- Occupation: Actor
- Years active: 1967–1995
- Spouse: Bala Tripurasundari
- Children: 4; including Saakshi Siva

Sakshi Ranga Rao (born Rangavajhula Ranga Rao; 1941 or 1942 – 27 June 2005) was an Indian character actor who worked in Telugu cinema and theatre. He appeared in about 450 films over a career spanning four decades, majority of which were comedies. Ranga Rao made his film debut in 1967 with Sakshi from which he derived his stage name. He then went onto to appear in successful films like Sirivennela, Swarna Kamalam, April 1st Vidudhala, Joker and Swarabhishekam.

== Life and career ==
Rangavajhula Ranga Rao in Kalavakuru village in Prakasam district, was born to Lakshmi Narayana and Ranganayakamma. As his father died when he was young, he was raised by Buchchi Ravamma, his mother's sister in Machilipatnam. He began his career as a stenographer in Andhra University, Visakhapatnam.

As Ranga Rao was interested in film and theatre, he worked as an assistant to the stage artist Kuppili Venkateswara Rao. He was encouraged by some his friends at Andhra Viswa Vidyalaya to pursue a full-time career in films. They gathered him some money and sent Ranga Rao to Madras.

Director Bapu gave break to Ranga Rao with the film Sakshi in 1967. Then onwards, he became known as Sakshi Ranga Rao, also to differentiate himself from S. V. Ranga Rao. He had the distinction of acting in most of the Telugu films directed by K. Vishwanath, Bapu and Vamsi.

Ranga Rao married Bala Tripurasundari. They had three children–one daughter and three sons. His youngest son, actor Saakshi Siva works in Telugu films and television.

Ranga Rao died after a prolonged illness on 27 June 2005 in Chennai at the age of 63 years. Incidentally, it was on stage that Ranga Rao collapsed on 5 May 2005 during a rehearsal for the Gurazada play, 'Kanyasulkam'. The apparent cause of his death was diabetes and associated kidney failure.

== Filmography ==
=== Films ===
1. Saakshi (1967) (debut film)
2. Bangaru Pichika (1968)
3. Sudigundaalu (1968) as Gumasta
4. Bhale Rangadu (1969)
5. Buddhimanthudu (1969)
6. Balaraju Katha (1970)
7. Dharma Daata (1970)
8. Thaali Bottu (1970) as Rangaiah
9. Pagabattina Paduchu (1971) as Hanumanthu
10. Basthi Bul Bul (1971) as Ranga Rao
11. Pattindalla Bangaram (1971) as Drama Company Owner
12. Attalu Kodallu (1971) as brother of Suryakantam
13. Adrusta Jathakudu (1971)
14. Mattilo Manikyam (1971) as Seethapathi aka Panthulu
15. Vinta Samsaram (1971)
16. Kalam Marindi (1972)
17. Muhammad bin Tughluq (1972)
18. Anta Mana Manchike (1972)
19. Devudu Chesina Manushulu (1973) as Papa Rao
20. Andala Ramudu (1973) as Subba Rao's father-in-law
21. Nindu Kutumbam (1973) as Avatharam
22. Bhakta Tukaram (1973)
23. Devudamma (1973) as Kotaiah
24. Manchi Vallaki Manchivadu (1973)
25. Meena (1973) as Narayana, Meena's driver
26. Mayadari Malligadu (1973) as Karanam Kamayya
27. Tulabharam (1974) as Hari
28. Mangalya Bhagyam (1974) as Pullachari
29. Muthyala Muggu (1975)
30. Padi Pantalu (1976) as Panthulu, Guravayya's accountant
31. Siri Siri Muvva (1976)
32. Alludochadu (1976) as Panasayya
33. Pichi Maraju (1976)
34. Aadavalu Apanindhalu (1976)
35. Iddaru Iddare (1976) as Bhujangam
36. Monagadu (1976) as Avatharam
37. Raaja (1976) as Pawn Broker Prakash
38. Shri Rajeshwari Vilas Coffee Club (1976)
39. Amara Deepam (1977) as Manager
40. Eenati Bandham Yenatido (1977) as Kanakaiah
41. Edureeta (1977)
42. Manassakshi (1977)
43. Manushulu Chesina Dongalu (1977)
44. Devathalara Deevinchandi (1977)
45. Love Marriage (1978) as Dance Director
46. Nayudu Bava (1978) as Gopalam
47. Patnavasam (1978) as Ramanatham
48. Dongala Veta (1978) as Seth
49. Lawyer Viswanath (1978)
50. Seetamalakshmi (1978)
51. Dongala Veta (1978)
52. Mugguru Muggure (1978) as Kotilingam the Museum Guard
53. Siri Siri Muvva (1978)
54. Vayasu Pilichindi (1978)
55. Thoorpu Velle Railu (1979)
56. Andadu Aagadu (1979) as Ling Papa Rao
57. Tiger (1979)
58. Idi Katha Kaadu (1979)
59. I Love You (1979) as Club Owner
60. Saptapadhi (1980)
61. Sirimalle Navvindi (1980)
62. Subhodhayam (1980)
63. Bhale Krishnudu (1980)
64. Gopala Rao Gari Ammayi (1980)
65. Alludu Pattina Bharatam (1980)
66. Sankarabharanam (1980)
67. Amavasya Chandrudu (1981)
68. Babulugaadi Debba (1981)
69. Thyagayya (1981)
70. Radha Kalyanam (1981)
71. Madhura Swapnam (1982)
72. Pratigna (1982) as Karanam
73. Manchu Pallaki (1982) as Gita's father
74. Kalavari Samsaram (1982) as Subbaramaiah
75. Kalahala Kapuram (1982) as Drunkard
76. Subhalekha (1982)
77. Sagara Sangamam (1983)
78. Ikanaina Marandi (1983)
79. Bezawada Bebbuli (1983)
80. Sitaara (1983)
81. Amarajeevi (1983)
82. Nelavanka (1983)
83. Rendu Jella Sita (1983)
84. Lanke Bindelu (1983) as Aachari
85. Koteeswarudu (1984) as Ranganatham
86. Janani Janmabhoomi (1984)
87. Mukkopi (1984)
88. Padmavyuham (1984)
89. Ooha Sundari (1984)
90. Danavudu (1984)
91. Sundari Subbarao (1984)
92. Allullostunnaru (1984)
93. Railu Dopidi (1984) as Arjun's father
94. Chattamtho Poratam (1985)
95. Punnami Ratri (1985) as Brahmanandam
96. Mogudu Pellalu (1985)
97. Vande Mataram (1985)
98. Mayadari Maridi (1985)
99. Bhale Tammudu (1985)
100. Ooriki Soggadu (1985) as Master
101. Mantradandham (1985)
102. Rendu Rella Aaru (1985)
103. Jailu Pakshi (1986)
104. Dharmapeetam Daddarillindi (1986)
105. Chaitanyam (1986)
106. Santhi Nivasam (1986)
107. Maruthi (1986)
108. Poojaku Panikiraani Puvvu (1986)
109. Vivaha Bandham (1986)
110. Brahmastram (1986) as Lingaraju
111. Chantabbai (1986)
112. Sirivennela (1986)
113. Sri Vemana Charithra (1986)
114. Kaliyuga Pandavulu (1986)
115. Kaliyuga Krishnudu (1986)
116. Chanakya Sapadham (1986) as Dr. Arogyam
117. Chakravarthy (1987) as Avatharam
118. Sankeerthana (1987)
119. Marana Homam (1987)
120. Pagabattina Panchali (1987)
121. Dayamayudu (1987)
122. Saradhamba (1987)
123. Chakravarthy (1987)
124. Ida Prapancham (1987)
125. Krishna Leela (1987)
126. President Gari Abbai (1987) as Seshavatharam
127. Sruthi Layalu (1987)
128. Raaga Leela (1987)
129. Nyayam Kosam (1988) as Narayana
130. Janaki Ramudu (1988)
131. Aadade Aadharam (1988)
132. Ramudu Bheemudu (1988) as Govindaiah
133. Rowdy No.1 (1988) as Avadhani
134. Annapurnamma Gari Alludu (1988)
135. Station Master (1988)
136. Bharya Bhartalu (1988) as Aachari
137. Marana Mrudangam (1988)
138. Swarna Kamalam (1988)
139. Bamma Maata Bangaru Baata (1989)
140. Swathi Chinukulu (1989)
141. Two Town Rowdy (1989)
142. Preminchi Choodu (1989)
143. Lankeswarudu (1989)
144. Manchi Kutumbam (1989)
145. Sutradhaarulu (1990)
146. Rambha Rambabu (1990)
147. Chevilo Puvvu (1990)
148. Idem Pellam Baboi (1990) as Rajashekharam
149. Karthavyam (1990) as Constable Ranganayakulu
150. Shanti Kranti (1991)
151. Manchi Roju (1991 film) (1991)
152. Erra Mandaram (1991)
153. Naa Pellam Naa Ishtam (1991)
154. Mugguru Attala Muddula Alludu (1991)
155. Pelli Pustakam (1991)
156. April 1st Vidudhala (1991)
157. Dharma Kshetram (1992) as Madhava Rao
158. Aa Okkati Adakku (1992)
159. Sukravaram Mahalakshmi (1992)
160. Kalarathrilo Kannepilla (1992)
161. Detective Narada (1992)
162. Sahasam (1992)
163. Gharana Mogudu (1992) as Bhawani's father
164. Swathi Kiranam (1992)
165. Joker (1993)
166. Kunti Puthrudu (1993)
167. Chittemma Mogudu (1993)
168. Nippu Ravva (1993)
169. Vintha Kodallu (1993)
170. Alludu Poru Ammayi Joru (1994) as Kanakachari
171. Presidentgari Alludu (1994) as Ranga Rao
172. Yamaleela (1994)
173. Madam (1994)
174. Subha Sankalpam (1995)
175. Street Fighter (1995) as Insurance Officer
176. Lingababu Love Story (1995)
177. Desa Drohulu (1995)
178. Vajram (1995)
179. Sampradayam (1996) as Rangaiah
180. Neti Savithri (1996)
181. Shri Krishnarjuna Vijayam (1996)
182. Aahwanam (1997)
183. Swarabhishekam (2004)
184. Vijay IPS (2006)

=== Television ===
- Lady Detective (1996–1997) as Bobby
- Popula Pette (1997) as Anjaneyulu
