= Pelli Pustakam (1991 film) =

- Theateral release poster
- Directed by: Bapu
- Screenplay by: Mullapudi Venkata Ramana
- Story by: Raavi Kondala Rao
- Produced by: Mullapudi Venkata Ramana
- Starring: Rajendra Prasad; Divyavani
- Cinematography: P. R. K. Raju
- Edited by: Anil Malnad
- Music by: K. V. Mahadevan
- Production company: Sri Seetarama Films
- Release date: 1 April 1991
- Running time: 144 mins
- Country: India
- Language: Telugu

Pelli Pustakam (transl. The Marriage Book) is a 1991 Telugu-language romantic comedy film directed by Bapu. The film was produced and co-written by Mullapudi Venkata Ramana. It stars Rajendra Prasad and Divyavani with music composed by K. V. Mahadevan. The film won three Nandi Awards, and was premiered in Indian Panorama section at the International Film Festival of India.

== Cast ==
- Rajendra Prasad as K. Krishna Murthy / KK
- Divyavani as Satyabhama / Bhama
- Sindhuja as Vasundhara / Vasu
- Gummadi as Sridhar Rao
- Subhalekha Sudhakar as Giri Babu
- Sakshi Ranga Rao as KK's father
- Raavi Kondala Rao as Babai
- Ananth as Co-Employee
- Ashok Kumar as Keemoji / Krishnaji
- Dharmavarapu Subramanyam
- Radha Kumari as Bhama's mother
- Jhansi as Vasundhara's mother

== Production ==
This film has a resemblance to the 1955 classic film Missamma.

== Music ==
Pelli Pustakam

Film score by K. V. Mahadevan
- Released: 1991
- Genre: Soundtrack
- Length: 32:10
- Label: AKASH Audio
- Producer: K. V. Mahadevan

K. V. Mahadevan chronology
Assembly Rowdy (1991)	Pelli Pustakam (1991)	Swathi Kiranam (1992)

Music was composed by K. V. Mahadevan. Lyrics were written by Arudra, except for the traditional Carnatic compositions Krishnam Kalaya Sakhi and Jagadanandakaraka, by Sri Narayana Teertha and Tyagaraja respectively. Music released on AKASH Audio Company.

No.	Title	Singer(s)	Length
1.	"Srirastu Subhamastu"	S. P. Balasubrahmanyam, P. Susheela	3:58
2.	"Ammakutti Ammakutti"	S. P. Balasubrahmanyam, P. Susheela	4:06
3.	"Krishnam Kalayasakhi"	S. P. Sailaja, Rajeshwari	3:34
4.	"Sarikotta Cheera"	S. P. Balasubrahmanyam	4:50
5.	"Aayi Aayi Srirangasayi"	P. Susheela	4:06
6.	"Papapapapapa Pappu Dappalam"	S. P. Balasubrahmanyam, S. P. Sailaja	4:39
7.	"Jagadanandakaaraka"	Vani Jayaram, Purnachander	3:20
Total length:			32:10

== Awards ==
Nandi Awards

- Second Best Feature Film - Silver - Mullapudi Venkata Ramana
- Best Dialogue Writer - Mullapudi Venkata Ramana
- Best Story Writer - Raavi Kondala Rao
