= Mutyala Muggu =

1975 film directed by Bapu

- Theatrical poster
- Directed by: Bapu
- Written by: Mullapudi Venkata Ramana (story and dialogues)
- Screenplay by: Bapu
- Produced by: Maddali Venkata Lakshmi Narasimha Rao
- Starring: Sangeeta; Sreedhar; Kanta Rao; Rao Gopal Rao; Mukkamala; Allu Ramalingaiah
- Cinematography: Ishan Arya
- Music by: K. V. Mahadevan; Sajjad Hussain
- Distributed by: Sri Rama Chitra
- Release date: 1975
- Running time: 165 min
- Country: India
- Language: Telugu

Mutyala Muggu (transl. A Muggu of pearls) is a 1975 Indian Telugu-language drama film adaptation of Uttara Ramayana from the writer-director duo of Ramana and Bapu. The film stars Sangeeta, Sreedhar, Kanta Rao, Rao Gopal Rao, Mukkamala, Allu Ramalingaiah and Nutan Prasad. The film has garnered two National Film Awards. The film recorded as blockbuster at the box office. Rao Gopal Rao received widespread acclaim for his role. The film was remade in Hindi as Jeevan Jyoti (1976).

== Plot ==
Raja Rao Bahadur (Kanta Rao) is the patriarch of a wealthy and charitable landlord family. At the request of his young son, Sreedhar, Rao helps Sreedhar's college friend, Hari, fund his higher education abroad. Grateful for the assistance, Hari invites Sreedhar to the village wedding of his sister, Laxmi (Sangeeta). In an unexpected twist of events, Sreedhar ends up marrying Lakshmi himself. This marriage enrages Raja's brother-in-law, Mukkamala, who had secretly hoped to marry off his own daughter (Jaya Malini) to Sreedhar.

What makes matters worse is that Laxmi wins over the royal household with her humility and good nature while Sreedhar falls in love with her innocence. She accidentally discovers a stash of the estate jewels in a well. Joginatham and Mukkamala try to implicate the Priest. Laxmi suggests that since they do not know conclusively as to who stole jewels, they should spare the Priest. Mukkamala, at the suggestion of the estate manager Joginatham (Allu Ramalingiah), then approaches Contractor (Rao Gopala Rao). Contractor agrees to break up the couple. But Contractor eyes the entire estate and its valuables and he entrap Mukkamala. He uses Kishtaiyya (Nutan Prasad) and creates suspicion in Sreedhar's mind with a sinister plan. Sreedhar falls prey to his doubts, comes to the conclusion that Laxmi is cheating on him and is only interested in his wealth.

He sends off pregnant Laxmi with all the family jewels. Laxmi gives the jewels off to Joginatham and decides to end her life. She is rescued by the Priest at whose house she gives birth to twins (a boy and a girl). Meanwhile, back at the estate, Sreedhar is depressed and loses interest in life and curses out Mukkamala when he proposes that Sreedhar should marry his daughter. The contractor then fixes up Kishtayya with Jaya Malini and proceeds to squeeze Mukkamala out of his money. After that, he takes possession of several antiques that Joginatham was trying to sell.

All that's left is the Deity's Jewels. The Raja who is distraught with the whole lifeless situation of the estate decides to leave the Deity's Jewels in the temple itself and wanders the villages. He stumbles upon Laxmi's kids (his grandkids), discovers the truth and requests Laxmi to come back. Laxmi refuses to come back and declares that this does not work with recommendations and that Sreedhar himself has to accept his mistake and come to her and ask her to come back. The Raja with the help of the kids and Sreedhar's friend hatch a plan to set things right with Sreedhar and beat the Contractor at his own game.

== Cast ==
- Sangeeta as Lakshmi, Sreedhar's wife
- Sreedhar as Sreedhar, Raja's son
- Kanta Rao as Raja Rama Dasu
- Rao Gopal Rao as Contractor
- Allu Ramalingaiah as Joginadham
- Mukkamala as Raja's brother-in-law
- Sakshi Ranga Rao
- Nutan Prasad as Kishtayya
- Jayamalini as Kistayya's wife
- Suryakantam as Contractor's wife
- Pisupati Venkateswara Rao as temple Pujari
- Mada
- Arja Janardhana Rao as Hanuman

== Production ==
The movie was shot mostly outdoors in the Gyan Bagh Palace in Hyderabad and on the Pulidindi Canal.

== Soundtrack ==
- "Entati Rasikudavo Teliseraa"

- Lyrics by C. Narayana Reddy, Playback Singer: P. Susheela & Composed by K.V. Mahadevan

- "Gogulu Pooche Gogulu Kache O Laccha Gummadi"

- Lyrics by C. Narayana Reddy, Playback Singer: P. Susheela & S.P. Balasubrahmanyam & Composed by K.V. Mahadevan

- "Edo Edo Annadi Eee Masaka Veluturu"

- Lyrics by C. Narayana Reddy, Playback Singer: V. Ramakrishna & Composed by K.V. Mahadevan

- "Nidurinche Totaloki Paata Okati Vachindi"

- Lyrics by Gunturu Seshendra Sharma, Playback Singer: P. Susheela & Composed by K.V. Mahadevan

- "Mutyamanta Pasupu Mukhamento Chhaaya"

- Lyrics by Arudra, Playback Singer: P. Susheela & Composed by K.V. Mahadevan

- "Sri Rama Jayarama Seetarama"

- Lyrics by Arudra, Playback Singer: M. Balamuralikrishna & Composed by K.V. Mahadevan

== Awards ==
National Film Awards - 1975

- National Film Award for Best Feature Film in Telugu
- National Film Award for Best Cinematography - Ishan Arya

Nandi Awards - 1975

- Second Best Feature Film - Silver - M. V. L. Narasimha Rao Legacy

"Mutyamanta Pasupu Mukhamento Chhaaya"song is played in the telugu 2026 movie Maa Inti Bangaram in which it is portrayed both daughter in laws perform their family duties sincerely.
