= Pulidindi =

- Village
- Interactive map of Pulidindi
- Location in Andhra Pradesh, India Pulidindi (India)
- Coordinates: 16.8588°N 81.7658°E
- Country: India
- State: Andhra Pradesh
- District: Konaseema

Languages
  - Official: Telugu
- Time zone: UTC+5:30 (IST)
- PIN: 533235
- Telephone code: +91–8855
- Vehicle registration: AP-5

Pulidindi is a village in Konaseema district of the Indian state of Andhra Pradesh. It is located in Atreyapuram Mandal of Amalapuram revenue division.

Pulidindi Canal was the location for much of outdoor shooting for Bapu's 1975 Telugu movie, Muthyala Muggu.
