= Mullapudi Venkata Ramana =

Indian writer

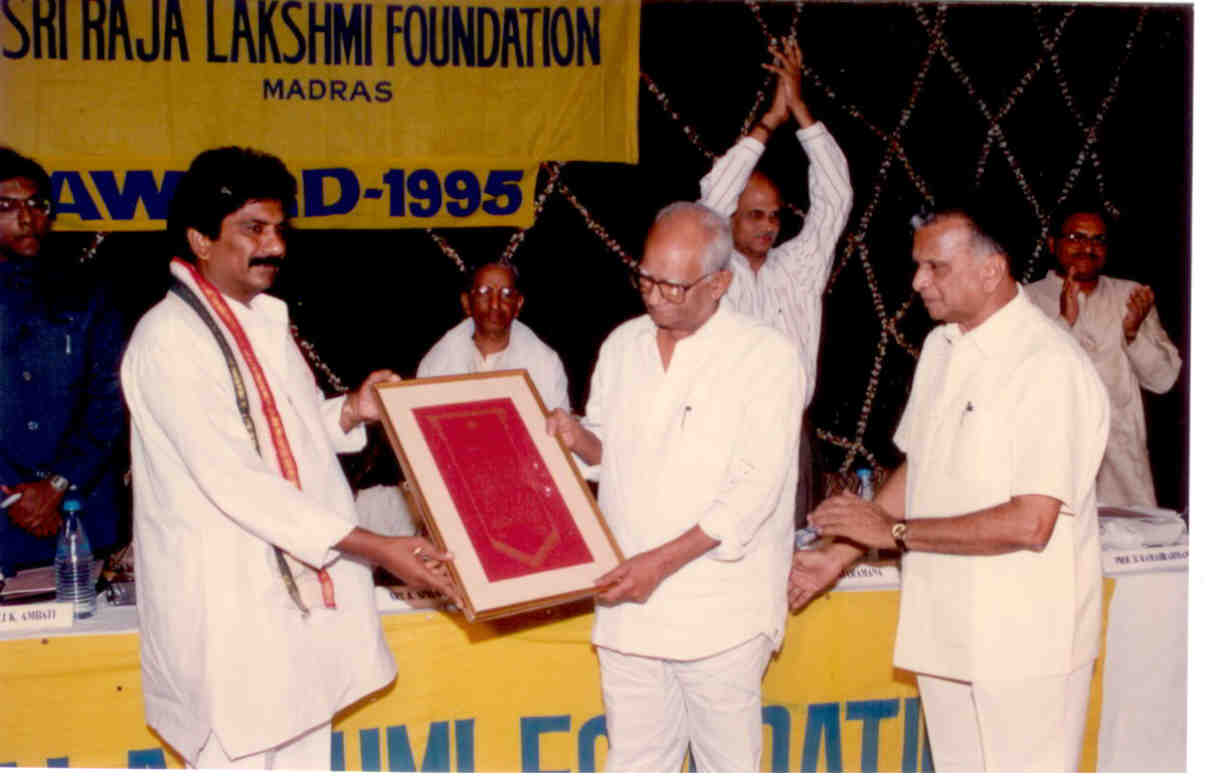
- Mayor Sabbam Hari (left) presenting Raja-Lakshmi Award to Mullapudi (centre) in 1995
- Born: 28 June 1931; Rajahmundry, Madras Presidency, British India (present-day Andhra Pradesh, India)
- Died: 24 February 2011 (aged 79); Chennai, Tamil Nadu, India
- Occupation: Writer
- Writing career
- Years active: 1960-2011

Mullapudi Venkata Ramana (28 June 1931 – 24 February 2011) was an Indian writer known for his work in Telugu language. Noted for his humorous and metaphorical style of writing, Mullapudi received Raghupathi Venkaiah Award from the Government of Andhra Pradesh in 1986 for his contributions to Telugu cinema and he also won six Nandi Awards.

Mullapudi is noted for his association with Bapu, who both worked together as Bapu–Ramana. The director–writer duo went onto make many successful films such as Bangaru Pichika (1968), Andala Ramudu (1973), Sampoorna Ramayanam (1973), Mutyala Muggu (1975), Pelli Pustakam (1993), Mister Pellam (1995), and Radha Gopalam (2005). He is also an essayist and cartoonist who is known for creating Budugu, a character considered as a corner stone for Telugu children's literature.

== Early life ==
Mullapudi Venkata Ramana was born in middle-class traditional family and his childhood mostly spent in a tiny village called Dowleswaram near Rajahmundry, Andhra Pradesh. Mullapudi had one elder sister and a younger brother. It was a happy family with no troubles until his father expired when Mullapudi was 9 years old. This turned their status upside down and they shifted to Chennai (called Madras in those days) for better opportunities. Mullapudi's mother Mrs. Adilakshmi took all the pains to raise the family in such situation. Mullapudi's education and career happened in Madras. During his study days, he had shown penchant for literature in Telugu and inclination in writing up short, effective storylines.

During the same period, he got a friend, 'Bapu'. Their friendship was mutually expanding capacities as Mullapudi did write-ups whereas Bapu painted and did caricature drawing. Later in their lives, they worked together on a number of Telugu films.

Katha Ramaneeyam' Part-1 having around 40 stories off 8 chapters each of them representing one of Navarasams (Nine emotions each human has). Some of them were made Films later viz. Seetha Kalyanam, Bhogimanta, Swayamvaram etc..

Katha Ramaneeyam' Part-2 having about 45 stories, some of which represent Indian middle-class' tryst with life in hilarious way.

Runanandalahiri is representation of average Indians, leading life in the times of inflation, joblessness, less privileged society and their tryst with their lives' problems. Mullapudi himself suffered such upsets in his life and even frank enough that some characters inspired from his own sufferings but dealt with in a humorous way.

== Career ==
After completing SSLC in Madras, Mullapudi had to do many odd jobs before starting as a reporter for then-popular newspaper Andhra Patrika in 1953. Here he got the opportunity to interact with eminent writers of Telugu literature like Nanduri Ramamohana Rao, Pilaka Ganapati Sastri, Surampudi Seetaram etc. who were working for the same newspaper.

Sri. Mullapudi was first working for the "Daily" section of the newspaper and then shifted to "Weekly" section. While working here, his stories for children in the name of 'Budugu' (lil kid) were published and became very popular. He authored these stories to present the views of the little kids off their elders in the family. These stories are humorous, informative, knowledgeable to children and at the same time helping the elderly to know the thought process of their kids. Later, these stories were published in the form of a book, which was well received.

While writing for the "Cinema Page" section in the paper, Mullapudi's short and crisp writing helped him to gain popularity for his film reviews. That was the same time when he got introduced to film industry and befriended the famous stars of film fraternity. He got introduced to some great directors of those times, Adurthi SubbaRao and Dundi, who encouraged him to work for films. RakthaSambandam was his first break as a writer; since then he never lagged in his progress as story, screenplay, dialogue writer.

=== Films ===
Mullapudi's writing talent highlighted with his movie reviews and stories he wrote for films. Some of the initial films for story, screenplay dialogue Velugu needalu, Kanney manasulu were runaway hits, that has kept Mullapudi in good stead. Mooga manasulu, Bharya Bharthalu, Velugu Needalu and Teney manasulu have firmly established him as story writer. Some of these films had ANR (Akkineni NageswarRao) in the lead and their association brought their talent to the fore.

Soon, he became sought after film story writer and gave up his journalist job at Andhra Patrika. He partnered with his childhood friend Bapu and co-produced their first film Sakshi featuring actor Krishna which got accolades for its storyline and direction.

Bhakta Kannappa (great disciple of 'Lord Siva') with actor Krishnam Raju, who was till then doing villain roles, was a commercial success. However, the milestone in his career is Sampoorna Ramayanam (1971), featuring Shoban Babu as Lord Rama, was a commercial success.

=== Association with Bapu ===
Mullapudi's association with Bapu has a 60-year career plan. They first met in 1942 in P.S. High School, Madras where they studied V and VI level and then continued schooling at Kesari High School. Mullapudi's first short story "Amma Maata Vinakapothe" was published in 1945 in Bala, a children's magazine published by Radio Annayya (Nyayapathi Raghava Rao). He was 14 then. Bapu illustrated the story. His paintings were liked and that was the beginning of their long-standing association.

While Bapu achieved much of his fame for a more-subtle style of art, Mullapudi's work featured more-talkative characters who were less focused on making sense of the world around them. They began as an illustrator-story writer team and then turned into a film-director-writer duo. They have contributed immensely to the enrichment of Telugu cultural ethos through literature and cinema

Mullapudi collaborated with Bapu by providing scripts and dialogue that complemented Bapu's visual style. Their long-standing professional association resulted in several social films, including Radha Kalyanam, Vamsa Vruksham, Pelli Pustakam, Mr. Pellam, Sundarakanda, and Radhaagopalam.

MuthyalaMuggu is regarded as a notable film of its time, with themes and characters that have continued to be discussed in later years. The film marked an early negative-role performance by Rao Gopal Rao, who later became known for portraying antagonistic characters. The dialogue, written by Mullapudi, received widespread attention and remained popular with audiences.

Mullapudi translated the Thiruppavai written by the Tamil Vaishnavite saint Andal into Telugu as Melupalukula Melukolupu. This translation used Bapu's illustrations for each translated verse.

=== Television ===
During the years 1985–90, Mullapudi and Bapu made videos for school subjects for children on television. At the behest of then the chief minister of Andhra Pradesh Dr. N.T RamaRao, Bapu-Ramana made these education videos which were aired by Doordarshan in Telugu were very popular. The same were later dubbed and aired by National Doordarshan. A.R. Rahman was then an upcoming drummer, providing background music for few of these videos.

In this millennium, the magic of the Bapu-Ramana combination provided their expertise for the mega mythology serial Bhagavatham on ETV. Etv Sri Bhagavatam serial cast : Arun Govil as Dasavatara and Maha Vishnu, Sunil Kumar Sharma as Rama and Krishna, Gargi Roy Chaudhury as Sita and Rukhmini, Sharmilee Raj as SatyaBhama and Bhudevi, Bhavana as Jambavati, Sana as Yashodha, AVS as Narada, etc.,. It was well received by audience and firmly scaled up TRPs for the channel. Also directed Sri Venkateswara Vaibhavam for SVBC-TTD Channel by Bapu Ramana with SaiKiran, Mounica, Ashmita.

== Autobiography ==
Kothi Kommachi, Inkothi Kommachi and Mukkothi Kommachi are Mullapudi's three-volume autobiography in books and audio forms. Just like the titles, the story keep hopping timelines and incidents. To put it in Mullapudi's own words, "it is like a monkey hopping from one branch to another branch."

== Awards ==
Mullapudi's career encompassed journalism, literature, film criticism, screenwriting, dialogue writing, and other contributions to the Indian film industry. Despite his prominence in these fields, some commentators and admirers have noted that he did not receive a Padma award from the Government of India. Various explanations have been suggested for this omission, including his personal background and his lack of association with political parties, although no official reason has been given.

However, he received widespread appreciation for his work in Telugu language and cinema.

- He was felicitated with Raghupathi Venkaiah Award for excellence in Films in 1986 instituted by the state of A.P.
- Received Honorary Doctorate awarded by Sri Venkateswara University, Tirupati.
- He was awarded the Raja-Lakshmi Literary Award for 1995 from Sri Raja-Lakshmi Foundation, Chennai.

Nandi Awards

- Second Best Story Writer – Poola Rangadu (1967)
- Best Story Writer – Kathanayakudu (1969)
- Second Best Story Writer – Andala Ramudu (1973)
- Best Dialogue Writer – Pelli Pusthakam (1991)
- Second Best Feature Film – Silver – Pelli Pusthakam (1991)
- Second Best Story Writer – Mister Pellam (1993)

== Death ==
Mullapudi died of old-age related illness in Chennai on 24 February 2011. At the time of the death, he just completed the work for another mythological film Sri RamaRajyam.

== Filmography ==
This is partial list of his films. Kindly help expanding it.

Year	Film	Credits
1960	Rakta Sambandham	Dialogues
1961	Iddaru Mitrulu	Dialogues
1963	Mooga Manasulu	Writer
1964	Velugu Needalu	Dialogues
1964	Daagudu Mootalu	Writer
1965	Preminchi Choodu	Dialogues
1965	Tene Manasulu	Story and Dialogues
1966	Kanne Manasulu	Story and Dialogues
1966	Navarathri	Dialogues
1967	Poola Rangadu	Story
1967	Prana Mitrulu	Story and Dialogues
1967	Saakshi	Writer
1968	Bangaru Pichika	Writer
1969	Buddhimantudu	Story and Screenplay
1969	Kathanayakudu	Story
1970	Balaraju Katha	Dialogues
1971	Bhale Rangadu	Story
1971	Sampoorna Ramayanam	Writer
1972	Kathanayakudu	Story
1973	Andala Ramudu	Writer
1975	Muthyala Muggu	Writer
1976	Bhakta Kannappa	Writer
1976	Seetha Kalyanam	Writer
1978	Gorantha Deepam	Story, Screenplay and Dialugues
1978	Mana Voori Pandavulu	Dialogues
1980	Kaliyuga Ravanaasurudu	Writer
1980	Rajadhi Raju	Story, Screenplay and Dialogues
1980	Vamsa Vruksham	Screenplay and Dialogues
1981	Radha Kalyanam	Writer
1981	Tyagayya	Writer
1982	Pelleedu Pillalu	Story and Dialogues
1983	Manthrigari Viyyankudu	Writer
1985	Bullet	Story, Screenplay and Dialogues
1985	Jackie	Writer
1986	Kalyana Tamboolam	Writer
1991	Pelli Pusthakam	Dialogues, Screenplay and Dialogues
1993	Mr. Pellam	Writer
1993	Srinatha Kavi Sarvabhowmudu	Writer
1994	Pelli Koduku	Writer
1996	Rambantu	Writer
1999	Panchadara Chilaka	Writer
2004	Xtra	Music director
2005	Radha Gopalam	Story, Screenplay and Dialogues
2006	Hanuman	Dialogues
2008	Sundarakanda	Story, Screenplay and Dialogues
2011	Sri Rama Rajyam	Story and Dialogues

== See also ==
- Raghupathi Venkaiah Award
