= Bapu (director) =

India director and artist (1933–2014)

- Bapu when conferred with the "Viswa Vikhyata Darsaka Maharshi" award in 2014
- Born: Sattiraju Lakshminarayana; 15 December 1933; Narasapuram, Madras Presidency, British India (now in Andhra Pradesh, India)
- Died: 31 August 2014 (aged 80); Chennai, Tamil Nadu, India
- Education: University of Madras
- Spouse: Bhagyavathi
- Awards: Padma Shri (2013)
- Website: bapuartcollection.com

Sattiraju Lakshminarayana (15 December 1933 – 31 August 2014), known professionally as Bapu, was an Indian film director, painter, illustrator, cartoonist, screenwriter, music artist, and designer known for his works in Telugu cinema, and Hindi cinema. In 2013, he was awarded the Padma Shri, for his contribution to Indian art and cinema. He has garnered two National Honors, two National Film Awards, seven state Nandi Awards, two Filmfare Awards South, a Raghupathi Venkaiah Award, and a Filmfare Lifetime Achievement Award – South.

Bapu's directorial venture Sakshi (1967) was showcased at Tashkent International film festival in 1968. Seeta Kalyanam (1976) was screened at the BFI London Film Festival, Chicago International Film Festival, San Reno and Denver International Film Festivals in 1978, and is part of the course at the British Film Institute. Tyagayya (1981) and Pelli Pustakam (1991) were premiered at the Indian Panorama of the International Film Festival of India. Bapu's 2011 film, Sri Rama Rajyam, had a special screening at International Film Festival of India on 28 November 2011.

In 1996, he appeared in the Doordarshan Documentary Eminent Cartoonists of India, and was awarded Lifetime Achievement from Indian Institute of Cartoonists in 2001. He gained international recognition through his art works viz., Bapu Bomma, The Navarasas, and the Indian Dances etc., which were held at the National Film Theatre, London, in 1978 and at the innumerable Telugu Conferences in the United States. He had worked as a graphic artist for J Walter Thomson, Efficient Publicities and F. D. Stewarts, Chennai.

In 1964, he was a delegate at the UNESCO sponsored seminar in Bangalore on Children's Books. The same year, he gave demonstrations for the training course programme on book illustrations and cover designs sponsored by UNESCO in Chennai. In the 1960s he served as an art Consultant for Ford Foundation sponsored The Southern Language Book Trust. He had designed and illustrated several books for leading publishers in South India out of which, five received Government Awards. He had also done the same for innumerable works drawn from Puranas and folklore.

== Early life and background ==
Bapu was born on 15 December 1933, in Narsapuram, in present-day West Godavari district, Andhra Pradesh, India to Sattiraju Venugopala Rao and Suryakantam. He worked as a political cartoonist for the newspaper Andhra Patrika in 1945. He holds B.Com. (1953) and BL (1955) from University of Madras.

== Painting ==
Bapu's paintings focus on Hindu mythological characters, and he painted the Hindu epic Ramayana as a pictorial story. His character portrayals, such as Shiva, Bhima, Duryodhana, look distinctly male with wide chests, large jaws and large biceps; while Krishna and Rama are more feminine in build.

== Film career ==
=== Association with Ramana ===
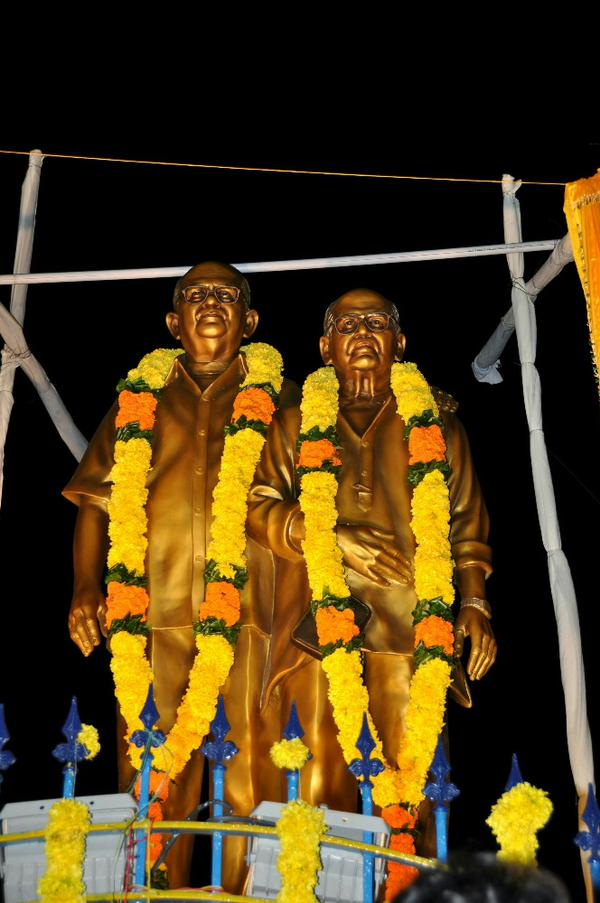
Bapu & Ramana gari statue on the banks of River Godavari during Pushkaram.

Bapu's family was staying in Madras and in 1942, when the Japanese bombed Madras, there was a panic exodus and Bapu's family moved to Narasapuram and stayed there till 1945, when the Second World War ended. Bapu studied in Taylor High School, Narasapuram during these years.

Mullapudi Venkataramana's father, who was working as a Sub-Registrar was posted at Narasapuram during the years 1942-45 and so, Venkataramana also studied in Taylor high School, Narasapram, during those years. They were classmates during those three years and that is how their association started. They continued schooling at Kesari High School, Madras. Ramana's first short story 'Amma Maata Vinakapote' was published in 1945 in 'Bala', a children's magazine published by Radio Annayya (Nyayapathi Raghava Rao), he was 14 then. Bapu illustrated the story. That was the beginning of their career as a writer-producer -illustrator- filmmaker duo".

Started as an illustrator-story writer team and then turning into a film-director-writer duo, they have contributed to the enrichment of Telugu cultural ethos through literature and cinema. The most notable achievement in his movie making is his success in capturing the nativity of Telugu people and translating it to on-screen visuals.

Ventures like Sampoorna Ramayanamu, Ramanjaneya Yuddham and Seeta Kalyanam have been the milestones of Telugu cinema, while historical films like Thyagayya, Bhakta Kannappa and Shreenatha kavisarvabhouma have been hugely successful. Bapu-Ramana combination had created movie magic on the large screen with some of the path breaking films in Telugu cinema and are ever remembered for films like Radha Kalyanam, Mutyala Muggu, Sakshi, Mr. Pellam, Pelli Pustakam. Bapu directed Mana Voori Pandavulu (1978), which won the Filmfare Award for Best Film - Telugu.

Bapu is known for his classic movies in Indian cinema, Bapu had directed Hindi films such as Hum Paanch, Bezubaan, Woh Saat Din, Mohabbat, Pyari Behna, Mera Dharam, Diljalaa, Prem Pratigyaa and Paramaatma.

== Death ==
Bapu had suffered heart attacks many times throughout his career. He was admitted into a hospital at Chennai in mid August 2014. He suffered from a cardiac arrest on 31 August 2014, and died later on the same day.

He was given a state funeral by the Government of Tamil Nadu.

== Filmography ==
1. Sakshi (1967)
2. Bangaaru Pichika (1968)
3. Buddhimantudu (1969)
4. Inti Gowravam (1970)
5. Balaraju Katha (1970)
6. Sampoorna Ramayanamu (1972)
7. Andala Ramudu (1973)
8. Sri Ramanjaneya Yuddham (1975)
9. Mutyala Muggu (1975)
10. Sita Kalyanam (1976)
11. Sri Rajeswari Vilas Coffee Club (1976)
12. Bhakta Kannappa (1976)
13. Sneham (1977)
14. Mana Voori Pandavulu (1978)
15. Gorantha Deepam (1978)
16. Toorpu Velle Railu (1979)
17. Vamsa Vruksham (1980)
18. Rajadhi Raju (1980)
19. Pandanti Jeevitam (1980)
20. Kaliyuga Ravanaasurudu (1980)
21. Hum Paanch * (1981)
22. Tyagayya (1981)
23. Radha Kalyanam (1981)
24. Bezubaan * (1982)
25. Krishnaavataram (1982)
26. Pelleedu Pillalu (1982)
27. Neethi Devan Mayakkam (1982)
28. Edi Dharmam Edi Nyayam? (1982)
29. Mantri Gari Viyyankudu (1983)
30. Woh Saat Din * (1983)
31. Seethamma Pelli (1984)
32. Mohabbat * (1985)
33. Pyari Behna * (1985)
34. Bullet (1985)
35. Jackie (1985)
36. Kalyana Tamboolam (1986)
37. Mera Dharam * (1986)
38. Diljalaa * (1987)
39. Prem Pratigyaa * (1989)
40. Pelli Pustakam (1991)
41. Mr. Pellam (1993)
42. Srinatha Kavi Sarvabhowmudu (1993)
43. Pelli Koduku (1994)
44. Paramaatma * (1994)
45. Rambantu (1995)
46. Xtra (2004) (as music director)
47. Radha Gopalam (2005)
48. Sundarakanda (2008)
49. Sri Rama Rajyam (2011)

Those marked as * are Hindi films

== Awards and honours ==
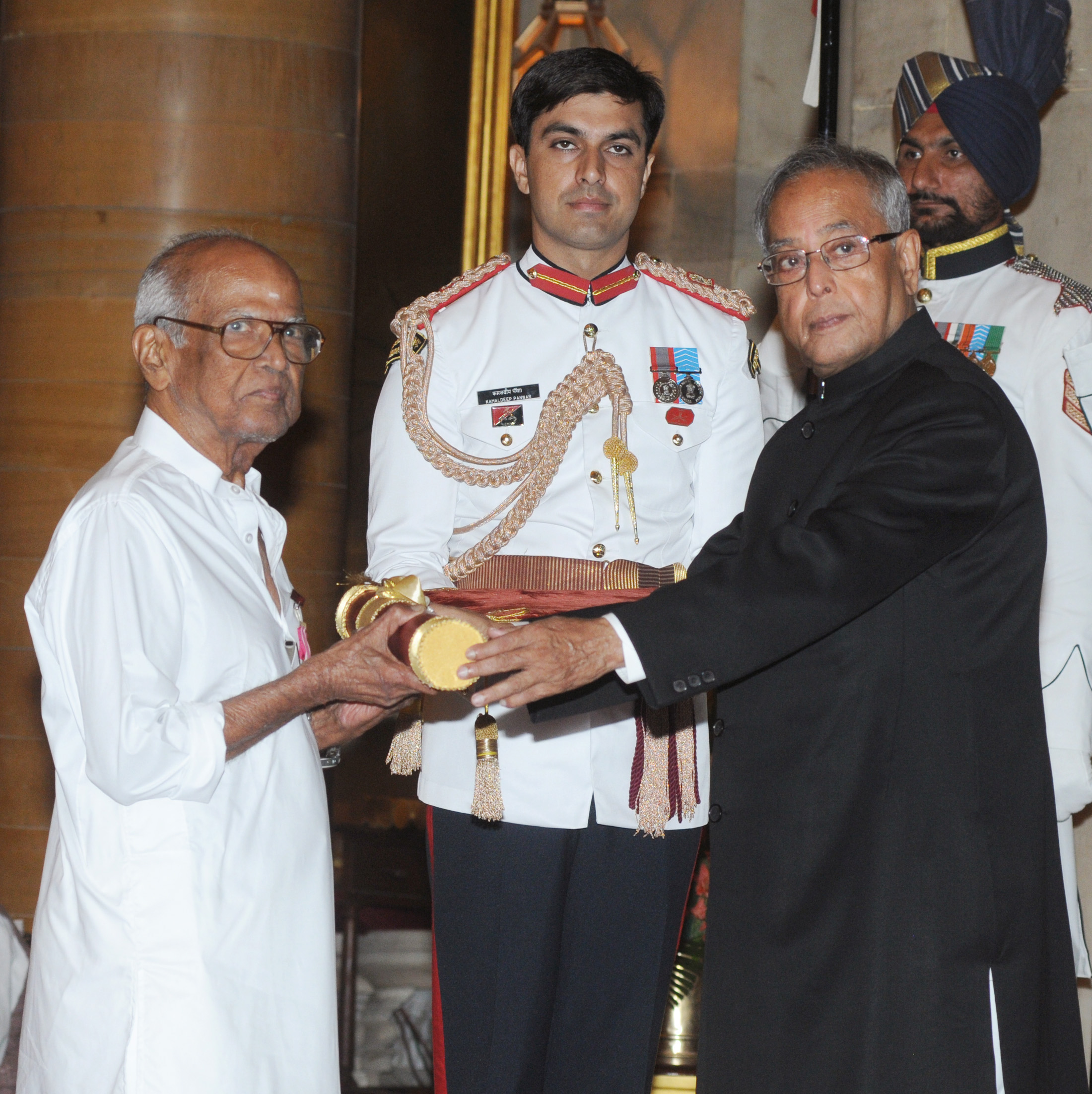
The President, Shri Pranab Mukherjee presenting the Padma Shree Award to Shri S. Lakshminarayana (Bapu), at an Investiture Ceremony, at Rashtrapati Bhavan, in New Delhi on April 05, 2013

Civilian honours

- Padma Shri – Government of India – 2013

National honours

- Life Time Achievement Award from Indian Institute of Cartoonists – 2001
- President of India Rashtrapati Award from the Academy of Fine Arts, Tirupati

National Film Awards

- National Film Award for Best Feature Film in Telugu – Mutyala Muggu
- National Film Award for Best Feature Film in Telugu – Mister Pellam

Filmfare Awards South

- Filmfare Best Director Award (Telugu) – Seeta Kalyanam (1976)
- Filmfare Best Director Award (Telugu) – Vamsa Vruksham (1980)
- Filmfare Lifetime Achievement Award – South – (2012)

Nandi Awards

- Raghupathi Venkaiah Award – Life Time Achievement in Telugu cinema – 1986

Nandi Award for Best Feature Film (director)

- 1971: Balaraju Katha
- 1973: Andala Ramudu
- 1975: Mutyala Muggu
- 1991: Pelli Pustakam
- 1993: Mr. Pellam
- 2011: Sri Rama Rajyam

Other Honours

- Asthana Vidwan by Andhra Pradesh Academy of Arts.
- South Indian Film Director's Association Award for Best direction – Sampoorna Ramayanam – 1972
- Visishta Puraskaramu from Potti Sreeramulu Telugu University – 2002
- Life Time Achievement Award from Telugu Association of North America
- "Shiromani" award fromBooks: American Telugu Association – 1992
- Honorary Doctorate "Kala Prapoorna" from Andhra University – 1991
- Raja-Lakshmi Award in 1982 from Sri Raja-Lakshmi Foundation, Chennai – 1982

== Bibliography ==
1. Ramayanam, co-written with Ramana. This book was published in Telugu, English and French languages.
2. Maha Bharatam, co-written with Ramana
3. Bapu Ramaneeyam, co-written with Ramana
4. Koti Kommachi, along co-written Ramana
5. (Im)Koti Kommachi, co-written with Ramana
6. Kosaru Kommachi, Bapu Ramaneeyam along with Ramana
7. Bapu Cartoonulu -1
8. Bapu Cartoonulu -2
9. Bommalu Geeyandi
10. Budugu, co-written with Ramana

== See also ==
- Raghupathi Venkaiah Award
