= Krishnam Raju filmography =

Actor

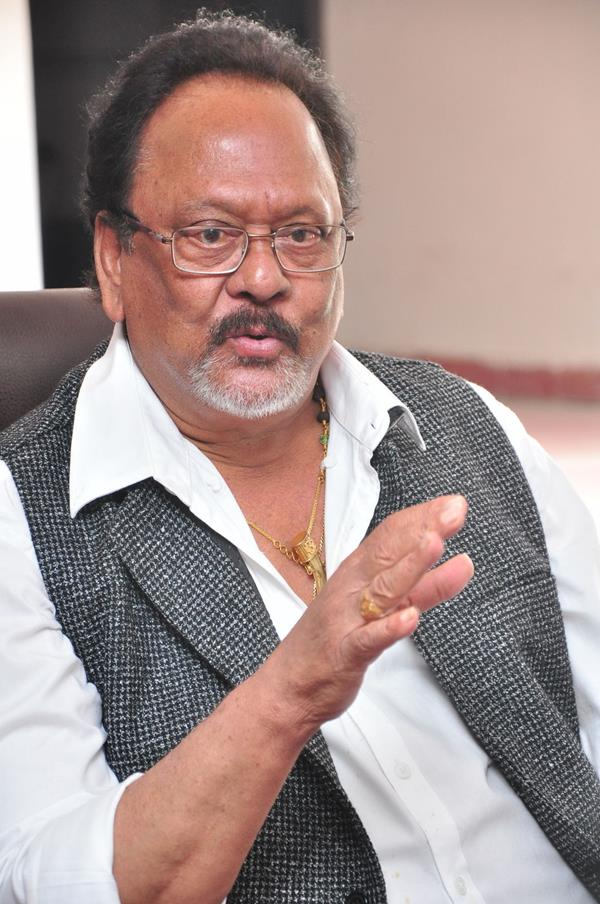
Krishnam Raju in 2016

Krishnam Raju (1940–2022) was an Indian actor who acted in more than 190 films. Krishnam Raju entered Tollywood in 1966 with the film Chilaka Gorinka, directed by Kotayya Pratyagatma alongside Krishna Kumari. The film won the Nandi Award for Best Feature Film - Silver for that year. Later he acted in the mythological film Shri Krishnavataram, which also stars N. T. Rama Rao. He acted in many films with the established actors N. T. Rama Rao and Akkineni Nageswara Rao. He also acted in many films with the established actresses Krishna Kumari, Rajasulochana, Jamuna and Kanchana.

Krishnam Raju acted alongside Kanchana in Nenante Nene and later he acted in Bhale Abbayilu, the Telugu remake of Yash Chopra's 1965 film Waqt. Later he acted in films such as Buddhimantudu, Manushulu Marali, Mallee Pelli and Jai Jawan. He acted opposite Bollywood actress Rekha in Amma Kosam, which was her first film as an actress. Later he acted in films such as Anuradha, Bhagyavantudu and Bangaru Talli, the remake of critically acclaimed 1957 Hindi film Mother India. Later he acted in films such as Muhammad bin Tughluq portraying the role of Islamic scholar Ibn Battuta, Raj Mahal, Hantakulu Devaantakulu opposite Rajasulochana, Manavudu Danavudu opposite Krishna Kumari, Neeti Nijayitee opposite Kanchana and Vinta Dampatulu opposite Jamuna. Later he acted in films such as Badi Panthulu, Bala Mitrula Katha, Jeevana Tarangalu and Kanna Koduku. In most of the films he acted as antihero, villain and supporting roles and in lead roles in a few films.

Krishnam acted in Bantrotu Bharya, which marks the first collaboration of Krishnam Raju with Dasari Narayana Rao. Later he acted in the critically acclaimed film Krishnaveni opposite Vanisri, directed by V. Madhusudhana Rao. The film marks the debut of Krishnam Raju as a producer under his own production house Gopi Krishna Movies. Later he acted in Parivartana opposite Jamuna, Kanchana and Lakshmi and in Bharati opposite Jamuna, Iddaru Iddare and Yavvanam Katesindi. Later he acted in Bhakta Kannappa portraying the roles of Arjuna and Kannappa Nayanar directed by Bapu, which is the unique Telugu film to win the National Film Award for Best Audiography. Later he acted in Kurukshetram portraying the role of Karna, directed by Kamalakara Kameswara Rao. Later he acted in Amaradeepam, which marks the first collaboration of Krishnam Raju with K. Raghavendra Rao. The film earned him the Filmfare Best Actor Award (Telugu) and the Nandi Award for Best Actor for the year 1977. Later he acted in films such as Jeevana Teeralu, Manushulu Chesina Dongalu and Sati Savitri. Later he acted in the lavishly made Katakataala Rudraiah, which grossed ₹75 lakh (US$79,000), made on a budget of ₹18 lakh (US$19,000). Later he acted in Mana Voori Pandavulu, produced by him and Jaya Krishna. The film garnered the Filmfare Best Film Award (Telugu) for the year 1978 and Krishnam Raju shared the award with Jaya Krishna. Katakataala Rudraiah and Mana Voori Pandavulu were released within a gap of 10 days and both the films became blockbusters. Later he acted in films such as Ramabanam, Andadu Aagadu in which he acts in a role of a spy which is parallel to James Bond and the film became a smash hit. Later he acted in Rangoon Rowdy, Shri Vinayaka Vijayamu portraying the role of Lord Shiva. Later he acted in films such as Shivamettina Satyam, Kalyana Chakravarti and Alludu Pattina Bharatam, which was directed by K. Viswanath. Later he acted in Sita Ramulu, Bebbuli and Prema Tarangalu, the Telugu remake of 1978 Bollywood blockbuster Muqaddar Ka Sikandar. In 1981, he acted in Aadavaallu Meeku Joharlu directed by K. Balachander. In the same year he acted in Agni Poolu which was based on Yaddanapudi Sulochana Rani's novel of the same name. Later he acted in the musical hit, Puli Bidda, Taxi Driver, Ragile Jwala, Guvvala Janta, Rama Lakshmanulu, Madhura Swapnam, Talli Kodukula Anubandham, Nipputo Chelagaatam, Golconda Abbulu, Jaggu, Pralaya Rudrudu and critically acclaimed Trisulam. Later he acted in Nijam Chebite Nerama!, Adavi Simhalu, Puli Bebbuli, Kotikokkadu and Dharmaatmudu.

In 1984, Krishnam Raju acted in Yuddham, Sardar, Babulugaadi Debba, Kondaveeti Nagulu and S. P. Bhayankar. Later, he acted in the Tollywood industrial hit Bobbili Brahmanna, which earned him the Filmfare Best Actor Award (Telugu) and the Nandi Award for Best Actor. He also remade the film in Hindi as Dharm Adhikari with Dilip Kumar and Jeetendra in 1986. Later, he acted in films such as Raraju, Bharatamlo Shankaravam, Rowdy, Bandee, Tirugubatu, Aggi Raju, Bullet, Ukku Manishi, Ravana Brahma, Neti Yugadharmam and Ugra Narasimham. In 1986, he acted in Tandra Paparayudu portraying the role of Tandra Paparayudu which earned him Filmfare Best Actor Award for the year 1986. The film was premiered at the 11th International Film Festival of India. Later, he acted in films such as Brahma Nayudu, Sardar Dharmanna and Marana Shasanam which earned him Filmfare Best Actor Award for the year 1987. In 1987, he acted in Vishwanatha Nayakudu portraying the role of Srikrishnadevaraya. Later, he acted in films such as Maarana Homam, Kirai Dada, Maa Inti Maha Raju, Antima Teerpu, Prithvi Raj, Prachanda Bharatam, Dharma Teja, Prana Snehitulu, Simha Swapnam, Shri Ramachandrudu, Bhagawan, Two Town Rowdy, Yama Dharma Raju and Neti Siddhartha.

In 1991, Krishnam Raju acted in Vidhata, Bava Bavamaridi, Jailor Gaari Abbayi, Andaroo Andare, Gangmaster. In 1994, he acted in Palnati Pourusham which earned him Filmfare Best Actor Award (Telugu). Later he acted in Rikshaw Rudraiah, Simha Garjana, Nayudugaari Kutumbam, Tata Manavadu, Kutumba Gowravam and Maa Nannaki Pelli which won Nandi Award for Akkineni Award for Best Home-viewing Feature Film. In 1997, he entered Sandalwood and acted in two Kannada films viz Hai Bangalore and Simhada Mari. Later he acted in Sultan, Vanshoddharakudu and Neeku Nenu Naaku Nuvvu, which won Nandi Award for Akkineni Award for Best Home-viewing Feature Film. Later he acted in Raam and Billa, a film of the Don film series and acted with Prabhas for the first time. Later he acted in Thakita Thakita and Rebel. Rebel marks the second innings of his production house, Gopi Krishna Movies. Krishnam Raju said in an interview that he would produce films continuously under the banner. Later he acted in Chandee and India's first 3D historical film, Rudramadevi, where he portrays the role of Ganapati Devudu, the father of Rudramadevi.

== As an actor ==
Year	Title	Role	Notes	Ref.
1966	Chilaka Gorinka	Raja		
1967	Sri Krishnavataram			
1968	Nenante Nene	Anand/Raj Kumar (Note: Krishnam Raju played a single character in the film who has two different names.)		
1969	Bhale Abbayilu	Babji / Raja		
1969	Bhale Master			
1969	Buddhimantudu	Krishna Moorti		
1969	Manushulu Marali			
1970	Malli Pelli	Chandra Shekhar		
1970	Jai Jawan	Ramu/Raghu		
1970	Amma Kosam	Anand		
1970	Thaali Bottu	Mohan		
1970	Pelli Sambandham	Krishna		
1970	Pelli Kooturu			
1970	Allude Menalludu			
1970	Drohi	Police Inspector		
1971	Pavitra Bandham	Shekhar		
1971	Anuradha	Bhaskar		
1971	Bhagyavantudu			
1971	Bangaaru Talli	Ranga		
1972	Sabhash Vadina			
1972	Muhammad bin Tughluq	Ibn Battuta		
1972	Raithu Kutumbam			
1972	Raj Mahal	Ratan Kumar / Raghu		
1972	Anta Mana Manchike	Krishna Gopal		
1972	Manchi Rojulu Vachayi	Raja		
1972	Hanthakulu Devanthakulu	Premnath		
1972	Manavudu Danavudu			
1972	Bhale Mosagadu			
1972	Neeti Nijayitee			
1972	Vintha Dampathulu			
1972	Inspector Bharya	Raju		
1972	Sabhash Baby			
1972	Mathrumurthi	Ramesh		
1972	Badi Panthulu	Venu		
1972	Illu Illalu			
1972	Ooriki Upakari	Jaggu		
1973	Bala Mitrula Katha	Bhanu		
1973	Stree			
1973	Jeevana Tarangalu	Chandram		
1973	Jeevitham			
1973	Vaade Veedu			
1973	Talli Kodukulu			
1973	Srivaru Maavaru	Bhujangam		
1973	Sneha Bandham			
1973	Gandhi Puttina Desam	Shivaiah		
1973	Mamatha			
1973	Mayadari Malligadu	Lawyer		
1973	Vishali			
1973	Inti Dongalu			
1973	Memu Manushalame			
1973	Poolamala			
1973	Abhimanavantulu	Ramu		
1973	Kanna Koduku	Gopi		
1974	Palletoori Chinnodu	Prasad		
1974	Jeevitharangam			
1974	Gundelu Teesina Monagadu			
1974	Manushullo Devudu	Murali		
1974	Chandana			
1974	Stree Gouravam			
1974	Tulasi			
1974	Bantrothu Bharya			
1974	Anaganaga Oka Tandri			
1974	Krishnaveni	Satyanarayana Murty		
1974	Nithya Sumangali			
1974	Adapillala Tandri			
1974	Inti Kodalu			
1974	Harathi			
1974	Palle Paduchu			
1974	Jeevithasayam			
1975	Chinnanati Kalalu			
1975	Parivartana			
1975	Moguda? Pellama?	Sankaram		
1975	Puttinti Gouravam			
1975	Bharathi			
1975	Naaku Swathanthram Vacchindi			
1976	Iddaru Iddare	Naga Raju		
1976	Yavvanam Kaatesindhi			
1976	Bhakta Kannappa	Arjuna/Kannappa Nayanar (Note: Krishnam Raju performed dual roles in the film.)		
1976	Adavallu Apanindalu			
1976	Amma Nanna	S. Madhav		
1976	Suprabhatam			
1976	Manchiki Maro Peru	Kiran		
1977	Kurukshetram	Karna		
1977	Oke Raktham	Prakash		
1977	Geetha Sangeetha			
1977	Mahanubhavudu			
1977	Bhale Alludu	Raju		
1977	Amara Deepam	Hari Prasad/Krishna		
1977	Jeevana Teeralu			
1977	Manushulu Chesina Dongalu			
1978	Sati Savitri	Satyavanta		
1978	Manchi Manasu	Raju		
1978	Katakatala Rudrayya			
1978	Mana Voori Pandavulu	Krishna		
1978	Ramudu Rangadu	Ramudu		
1979	Ramabanam			
1979	Kamalamma Kamatam	Ramudu		
1979	Cheyetthi Jai Kottu	Bhagawan		
1979	Andadu Aagadu	Vijay, Agent 116		
1979	Rangoon Rowdy	Raju		
1979	Sri Vinayaka Vijayamu	Lord Shiva		
1980	Sivamethina Satyam	Satyam and Raja		
1980	Kalyana Chakravarti	Kalyana Chakravarti		
1980	Alludu Pattina Bharatam			
1980	Sita Ramulu	Ramu		
1980	Bebbuli			
1980	Prema Tarangalu	Vijay		
1981	Aadavaallu Meeku Joharlu	Narsimha		
1981	Agni Poolu	Virupaksha Raja / Krishna Chaitanya		
1981	Puli Bidda	Kumar aka Chanti		
1981	Taxi Driver	Raja		
1981	Ragile Jwala	Krishna / Raja		
1981	Guvvala Janta			
1981	Rama Lakshmanulu			
1981	Babulugaadi Debba	Venu/Babulu		
1982	Madhura Swapnam			
1982	Talli Kodukula Anubandham			
1982	Nipputo Chelagaatam	Shankar / Mohan		
1982	Golconda Abbulu			
1982	Jaggu	Jaggu		
1982	Pralaya Rudrudu	Inspector Vijay/Dega/Don		
1982	Trisulam	Ramu		
1983	Nijam Chebite Nerama	Mohan		
1983	Adavi Simhalu	Raju		
1983	Puli Bebbuli	Raj Kumar		
1983	Kotikokkadu	Raja		
1983	Dharmaatmudu			
1984	Yuddham	Arjuna Rao / Raja		
1984	Sardar	Ananda Gajapathi/Raghu		
1984	Kondaveeti Nagulu	Nagulu		
1984	S. P. Bhayankar			
1984	Bobbili Brahmanna	Brahmanna/Ravi		
1984	Raraju	Raraju		
1984	Bharatamlo Shankharavam			
1984	Rowdy	Parasuram		
1985	Bandi			
1985	Tirugubatu			
1985	Aggi Raju	Raju		
1985	Bullet	Ch.V.V. Varahala Raju/Bullet		
1986	Ukku Manishi			
1986	Ravana Brahma	K. Brahma Nayudu/K. Raghunath		
1986	Neti Yuga Dharmam	Vijay		
1986	Ugra Narasimham	Balaraju		
1986	Tandra Paparayudu	Tandra Paparayudu		
1987	Brahma Nayudu	Brahma Nayudu		
1987	Sardar Dharmanna			
1987	Marana Shasanam	Balaram		
1987	Trimurtulu		Cameo	
1987	Viswanatha Nayakudu	Srikrishnadevaraya		
1987	Maarana Homam			
1987	Kirayi Dada	Krishna Raja Varma		
1988	Maa Inti Maharaju			
1988	Antima Teerpu	J. Krishna Moorti		
1988	Prithviraj	Prithviraj		
1988	Prachanda Bharatam			
1988	Dharma Teja	Dharma Teja		
1988	Prana Snehitulu			
1989	Simha Swapnam	Balaram / Krishnarjun / Simha Swapnam		
1989	Shri Ramachandrudu			
1989	Paape Maa Pranam	Madhu		
1989	Bhagawan	Bhagawan		
1989	Sumangali	J. Krishna Babu "J. K. B."		
1989	Two Town Rowdy	Ranjit Kumar		
1990	Guru Sishyulu	Raja		
1990	Yama Dharma Raju			
1990	Neti Siddhartha	Krishna Prasad		
1991	Indrabhavanam	Kumar		
1991	Vidhata	Harishchandra Prasad / Sudarshana Chakram		
1993	Bava Bavamaridi	Raghava Rao		
1993	Anna Vadina			
1994	Jailor Gaari Abbayi	Chakrapani		
1994	Andaru Andare	Chhatrapati		
1994	Gangmaster			
1994	Palnati Pourusham			
1994	Riksha Rudraiah			
1995	Simha Garjana			
1995	Leader			
1996	Nayudu Gari Kutumbam	Krishnama Nayudu		
1996	Tata Manavadu	Kakani Koteshwara Rao		
1997	Kutumba Gouravam	Mahendra Varma		
1997	Maa Nannaku Pelli	Raja Kalidindi Raghava Raju		
1997	Hai Bangalore		Kannada film	
1997	Simhada Mari	Dharmadhikari Veerendra Simha	Kannada film	
1998	Qaidi Gaaru	Krishna Prasad		
1999	Sultan	Mustafa		
2000	Vamsoddharakudu	Raja		
2003	Neeku Nenu Naaku Nuvvu	Raghavaiah		
2006	Raam	Dasharatha Ramaiah		
2009	Srisailam	K.V. Krishna Devarayalu		
2009	Billa	Krishna Moorti		
2009	Samarthudu	J.K.		
2010	My Name Is Amrita			
2010	Thakita Thakita			
2012	Rebel	Bhoopati		
2013	Chandee	Ashok Gajapati Raju		
2015	Yevade Subramanyam	Ramayya		
2015	Rudhramadevi	Ganapati Devudu		
2022	Radhe Shyam	Paramahamsa	Telugu version Last movie.	

== As a producer ==
Year	Title	Notes	Ref.
1974	Krishnaveni		
1976	Bhakta Kannappa		
1977	Amara Deepam		
1978	Mana Voori Pandavulu		
1980	Sita Ramulu		
1982	Madhura Swapnam		
1984	Bobbili Brahmanna		
1986	Dharm Adhikari		
1986	Tandra Paparayudu		
2009	Billa		
2022	Radhe Shyam	Presenter for the Telugu, Tamil, Kannada and Malayalam versions of the film	
