= Kannappa (disambiguation) =

Kannappa was an Indian Hindu (Shaivite) saint, counted among the 63 Nayanars.

Kannappa may also refer to:

- Kannappa (film), a 2024 Indian film about the saint by Mukesh Kumar Singh
- Priyadharshan Kannappan (born 1993), Indian chess grandmaster

== See also ==
- Bedara Kannappa, a 1954 Indian Kannada-language about the saint film by H. L. N. Simha
  - Bhakta Kannappa, a 1976 Indian Telugu-language film by Bapu, a remake of the above
- Kannappanunni, a 1977 Indian Malayalam-language film by Kunchako
