= Uppalapati =

Uppalapati (Telugu: ఉప్పలపాటి) is a Telugu surname. Notable people with the surname include:

- Prabhas (born as Uppalapati Venkata Satyanarayana Prabhas Raju, 1979), Indian actor
- Uppalapati Surya Narayana Raju (died 2010), Telugu producer
- Krishnam Raju (born as Uppalapati Venkata Krishnam Raju, 1940), Indian actor and politician
- Uppalapati Narayana Rao (born 1958), Indian director, screenwriter, scriptwriter, actor and producer
