= Aadavaallu Meeku Joharlu =

Aadavaallu Meeku Joharlu (lit. 'Women are a blessing to you') may refer to:

- Aadavaallu Meeku Joharlu (1981 film), Indian Telugu-language film
- Aadavallu Meeku Johaarlu (2022 film), Indian Telugu-language film by Kishore Tirumala
