= Chinnadantha Maga =

- Directed by: K. S. R. Das
- Written by: Kunigal Nagabhushan
- Screenplay by: K. S. R. Das
- Story by: Cheruvu Anjaneya Shastry
- Produced by: K. T. Venkatagiri
- Starring: Vishnuvardhan; Madhavi; K. R. Vijaya; Thoogudeepa Srinivas
- Cinematography: M. G. R. Mani
- Edited by: K. Mohana Rao
- Music by: Satyam
- Production company: Nagesh International
- Distributed by: Nagesh International
- Release date: 24 October 1983
- Running time: 144 min
- Country: India
- Language: Kannada

Chinnadantha Maga is a 1983 Indian Kannada-language film, directed by K. S. R. Das and produced by K. T. Venkatagiri. The film stars Vishnuvardhan, Madhavi, K. R. Vijaya and Thoogudeepa Srinivas. The film was a remake of the director's own Telugu film Talli Kodukula Anubandham.

== Cast ==
- Vishnuvardhan as Guruprasad
- Madhavi as Usha
- Kalyan Kumar as Ramachandra Rao, Guruprasad's father
- K. R. Vijaya
- Thoogudeepa Srinivas as Vishakanthaiah
- Chethan Ramarao
- Vijay Kashi
- Sadashiva Brahmavar as Ranga
- Rathnakar
- Sudheer as Kalabhairava
- N. S. Rao
- Kunigal Nagabhushan as an advocate
- Vishwanath
- Bheema Rao
- Jr. Narasimharaju
- Kumari Indira
- Anuradha as Lakshmi, Guruprasad's sister
- M. Jayashree
- Shanthamma
- Mamatha
- Mangalagowri
- Jyothilakshmi
- Jayamalini as Sunitha

== Soundtrack ==
The music was composed by Satyam.

| No. | Song | Singers | Lyrics | Length (m:ss) |
|---|---|---|---|---|
| 1 | "Savimaatanu Aadeya" | Vishnuvardhan, S. Janaki | Chi. Udaya Shankar | 04:41 |
| 2 | "Maatannu Aadaballe" | S. P. Balasubrahmanyam | Chi. Udaya Shankar | 05:09 |
| 3 | "Devaru Maadida Srustige" | S. P. Balasubrahmanyam | Chi. Udaya Shankar | 04:25 |
| 4 | "Mavayya Mavayya" | S. Janaki | Chi. Udaya Shankar | 04:26 |
| 5 | "Ee Yedeya Veene" | S. P. Balasubrahmanyam | Chi. Udaya Shankar | 04:05 |
