= Puli Bebbuli =

- Theatrical poster
- Directed by: K. S. R. Das
- Produced by: R. V. Gurupadam
- Starring: Krishnam Raju; Chiranjeevi; Jaya Prada; Radhika
- Music by: Rajan–Nagendra
- Production company: Kamala Cine Arts
- Release date: 16 June 1983
- Country: India
- Language: Telugu

Puli Bebbuli is a 1983 Telugu-language film directed by K. S. R. Das. This film stars Krishnam Raju, Chiranjeevi, Jaya Prada and Radhika.

== Cast ==
- Krishnam Raju as Raj Kumar
- Chiranjeevi as Gopi Krishna
- Jaya Prada as Sita
- Radhika as Sita's younger sister
- Kanta Rao as Gajapati
- Mikkilineni as Raj's adopted father
- Kaikala Satyanarayana
- Tiger Prabhakar as Rudraiah
- Kakarala as Sita's father
- Sarathi
- Pushpalatha
- Jayasri
- Krishnaveni
- Mohini
- Jayamalini

== Soundtrack ==
The soundtrack was composed by Rajan–Nagendra. All lyrics are written by Veturi. The tune of the song Parimalinchu Punnamilo was adapted from music director's own Kannada song Nanna Aase Hannagi from the 1980 Kannada film Auto Raja.

Track list
No.	Title	Singer(s)	Length
1.	"Parimalinchu Punnamilo"	S. P. Balasubrahmanyam, P. Susheela	4:38
2.	"Panikosthaavaa"	S. P. Balasubrahmanyam, P. Susheela	4:29
3.	"Goppendhuke Govindamma"	S. P. Balasubrahmanyam, P. Susheela	4:12
4.	"Chakkili Ginthammo"	S. P. Balasubrahmanyam, P. Susheela	4:21
Total length:			17:40
