= Filmfare Award for Best Actor – Telugu =

Indian annual film award

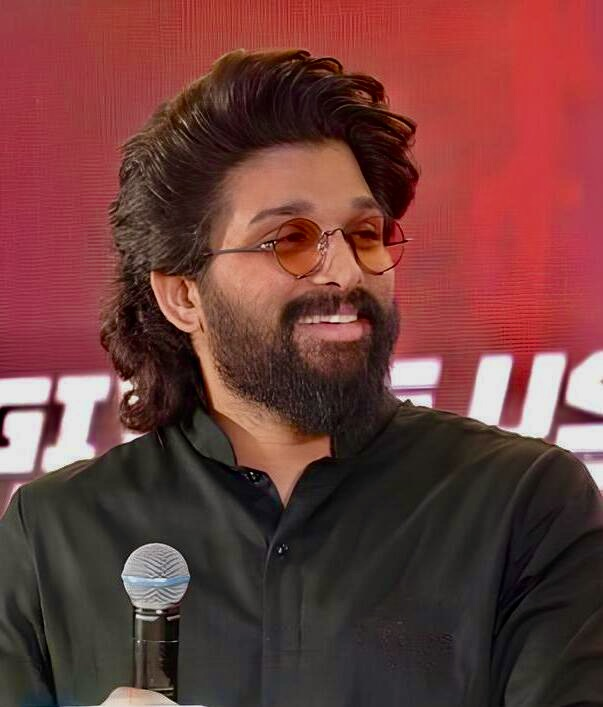
- The 2024 recipient: Allu Arjun
- Awarded for: Best Performance by an Actor in a Leading Role in Telugu films
- Country: India
- Presented by: Filmfare
- First award: 1972
- Currently held by: Allu Arjun, Pushpa 2: The Rule (2024)

Highlights
- Most awards: Chiranjeevi (7)
- Most nominations: Chiranjeevi (21)
- Website: Filmfare Awards

The Filmfare Award for Best Actor – Telugu is given by the Filmfare magazine as part of its annual Filmfare Awards South for Telugu films. The awards were extended to "Best Actor" in 1972. The year indicates the year of release of the film. Chiranjeevi is the most nominated actor, with 21 nominations and the most awarded, with seven wins.

== Winners and nominees ==
Table key
Indicates the winner

=== 1970s ===
Year of film release	Actor	Role(s)	Film	Ref.
1972	N. T. Rama Rao	Raghava Rao	Badi Panthulu	
1973	Akkineni Nageswara Rao	Abbi	Marapurani Manishi	
1974	Sobhan Babu	"Truck driver"	Khaidi Babai	
1974	Krishna	Alluri Sitarama Raju	Alluri Seetarama Raju	
1974	N. T. Rama Rao	Vijay	Nippulanti Manishi	
1975	Sobhan Babu	Vasu	Jeevana Jyothi	
1975	N. T. Rama Rao		Teerpu	
1975	Rao Gopal Rao	Contractor	Mutyala Muggu	
1976	Sobhan Babu	Sobhanadri	Soggadu	
1976	Akkineni Nageswara Rao	Varadayya / Kshetrayya	Mahakavi Kshetrayya	
1976	Krishnam Raju	Hari / Shri Krishna	Bhakta Kannappa	
1976	N. T. Rama Rao	Gopi	Aradhana	
1976	Narasimha Raju	Suryam	Thoorpu Padamara	
1977	Krishnam Raju	Hari / Shri Krishna	Amara Deepam	
1977	Akkineni Nageswara Rao	Raja Ramesh	Raja Ramesh	
1977	Anant Nag	Madan	Prema Lekhalu	
1977	N. T. Rama Rao	Ramu	Adavi Ramudu	
1977	Rajinikanth	Ravi	Chilakamma Cheppindi	
1978	Chandra Mohan	Gopalakrishna	Padaharella Vayasu	
1978	Vijayachander	Jesus/Messaiah	Karunamayudu	
1978	Kamal Haasan	Balaji	Maro Charitra	
1978	Krishnam Raju	Krishna	Mana Voori Pandavulu	
1979	Sobhan Babu	Sridhara Rao, Raja	Karthika Deepam	
1979	Gokina Rama Rao	Raghuramaiah	Punadhirallu	
1979	N. T. Rama Rao	Raja	Vetagaadu	

=== 1980s ===
Year	Actor	Role(s)	Film	Ref.
1980	J. V. Somayajulu	Sankara Sastry	Sankarabharanam	
1980	Chiranjeevi	Naagulu	Punnami Naagu	
1980	M. Prabhakar Reddy		Yuvatharam Kadilindi	
1980	Krishnam Raju	Ramu	Sita Ramulu	
1980	Sai Chand	Ramayya	Maa Bhoomi	
1981	Kamal Haasan	J. Ranga Rao	Aakali Rajyam	
1981	Akkineni Nageswara Rao	Rajesh	Premabhishekam	
1981	J. V. Somayajulu	Yajulu	Saptapadi	
1981	M. Prabhakar Reddy		Palle Pilichindi	
1981	N. T. Rama Rao	S. P. Ranjith Kumar / Ramu	Kondaveeti Simham	
1982	Chiranjeevi	Narasimha Murthi	Subhalekha	
1982	Akkineni Nageswara Rao	Ravindra Babu	Meghasandesam	
1982	Krishnam Raju	Ramu	Trisulam	
1982	N. T. Rama Rao	Chakradhar	Bobbili Puli	
1982	Sobhan Babu	Rambabu	Devatha	
1983	Kamal Haasan	Balakrishna	Sagara Sangamam	
1983	Chiranjeevi	Sooryam	Khaidi	
1983	Krishna	Krishna	Adavi Simhalu	
1983	Krishnam Raju	Ranganatham	Dharmaatmudu	
1983	Sobhan Babu	Chakravarthi	Mundadugu	
1984	Krishnam Raju	Brahmanna / Ravi	Bobbili Brahmanna	
1984	Akkineni Nageswara Rao	Kumar	Vasantha Geetam	
1984	Chiranjeevi	Gandhi	Challenge	
1984	Naresh	Ananda Rao	Srivariki Premalekha	
1984	Sobhan Babu	Venu	Sampoorna Premayanam	
1985	Chiranjeevi	Chinna Babu	Vijetha	
1985	Sobhan Babu	Rambabu	Maharaju	
1985	Krishna	Jamadagni / Chandram	Agni Parvatam	
1985	Murali Mohan		O Thandri Teerpu	
1985	Rajendra Prasad	Rambabu	Preminchu Pelladu	
1986	Krishnam Raju	Tandra Paparayudu	Tandra Paparayudu	
1986	Chiranjeevi	Panduranga Rao	Chantabbai	
1986	Kamal Haasan	Sivayya	Swati Mutyam	
1986	Rajasekhar		Repati Pourulu	
1986	Venkatesh	Vijay	Kaliyuga Pandavulu	
1987	Akkineni Nageswara Rao	Anand Rao	Aatma Bandhuvulu	
1987	Balakrishna	Gopi	Muvva Gopaludu	
1987	Chiranjeevi	Sambaiah	Swayam Krushi	
1987	Nagarjuna	Rajesh	Majnu	
1987	Rajasekhar	Narayana Murthy	Sruthilayalu	
1987	Rajendra Prasad	Krishna Murthy	Aha Naa Pellanta	
1988	Venkatesh	Shakthi	Brahma Puthrudu	
1988	Chiranjeevi	Suryanarayana Sharma	Rudraveena	
1988	Kallu Chidambaram		Kallu	
1988	Krishnam Raju	J. Krishna Moorti	Antima Teerpu	
1988	Nagarjuna	Vihari	Aakhari Poratam	
1989	Kamal Haasan	G. K. Rayudu / Chandru	Indrudu Chandrudu	
1989	Rajasekhar	Vijay	Ankusam	
1989	Chiranjeevi	Kalyan	Attaku Yamudu Ammayiki Mogudu	
1989	Nagarjuna	Prakash	Geetanjali	
1989	Nagarjuna	Siva	Siva	
1989	Venkatesh	Pruthvi	Prema	

=== 1990s ===
Year	Actor	Role(s)	Film	Ref.
1990	Rajasekhar	Vikram	Magaadu	
1990	Chiranjeevi	Raju	Jagadeka Veerudu Athiloka Sundari	
1990	Mohan Babu	Vishnu	Alludugaru	
1990	Rajendra Prasad	Vijay	Mama Alludu	
1990	Venkatesh	Raja	Bobbili Raja	
1991	Akkineni Nageswara Rao	Sitaramayya	Seetharamayya Gari Manavaralu	
1991	Balakrishna	Sri Krishnadeva Rayalu / Krishna Kumar	Aditya 369	
1991	Chiranjeevi	Rajaram	Gang Leader	
1991	Rajendra Prasad	Ramudu	Yerra Mandaram	
1991	Venkatesh	Chandu	Kshana Kshanam	
1992	Chiranjeevi	Madhava	Aapathbandavudu	
1992	Chiranjeevi	Raju	Gharana Mogudu	
1992	Mammootty	Anantha Rama Sharma	Swathi Kiranam	
1992	Nagarjuna	Raghav / Shekar	Antham	
1992	Venkatesh	Chanti	Chanti	
1993	Chiranjeevi	Subhash Chandra Bose	Muta Mestri	
1993	Jagapathi Babu	Durga	Gaayam	
1993	Rajasekhar	Raja	Allari Priyudu	
1993	Rajendra Prasad	Balaji	Mister Pellam	
1993	Venkatesh	Dora Babu	Abbaigaru	
1994	Rajasekhar	Komaranna	Anna	
1994	Akkineni Nageswara Rao	Srinivasa Rao	Bangaru Kutumbam	
1994	Jagapathi Babu	Madhu	Shubhalagnam	
1994	Nagarjuna	Deva / Ravi Varma	Hello Brother	
1994	Venkatesh	Ramu / Raju	Muddula Priyudu	
1995	Mohan Babu	Pedarayudu / Raja	Pedarayudu	
1995	J. D. Chakravarthy	Chandrasekhar	Gulabi	
1995	Kamal Haasan	Dasu	Subha Sankalpam	
1995	Nagarjuna	Raju	Gharana Bullodu	
1995	Naresh	Venkat Rao	Sogasu Chooda Tarama!	
1996	Venkatesh	Rakesh	Dharma Chakram	
1996	Jagapathi Babu	Madhu	Maavichiguru	
1996	Nagarjuna	Seenu	Ninne Pelladata	
1996	Srikanth	Vijay Krishna	Pelli Sandadi	
1996	Venkatesh	Ravi Chandra	Sahasa Veerudu Sagara Kanya	
1997	Nagarjuna	Annamayya	Annamayya	
1997	Chiranjeevi	Raj Kumar	Master	
1997	Jagapathi Babu	Jagapathi Babu	Chilakkottudu	
1997	Vadde Naveen	Naveen	Pelli	
1997	Venkatesh	Giri	Preminchukundam Raa	
1998	Venkatesh	Ganesh	Ganesh	
1998	Chiranjeevi	Raju	Bavagaru Bagunnara?	
1998	Nagarjuna	Raj Kapoor / Seeta Rama Rao	Chandralekha	
1998	Pawan Kalyan	Balu	Tholi Prema	
1998	Prakash Raj	Narasimha	Anthahpuram	
1999	Chiranjeevi	Simhadri / Chinnayya	Sneham Kosam	
1999	Balakrishna	Abbulu / Vaasu / Samarasimha Reddy	Samarasimha Reddy	
1999	Pawan Kalyan	Subramanyam	Thammudu	
1999	Ravi Teja	Ravi	Nee Kosam	
1999	Venkatesh	Raja	Raja	

=== 2000s ===
Year	Actor	Role(s)	Film	Ref.
2000	Venkatesh	Mahadeva Naidu / Rudrama Naidu / Abhiram	Jayam Manadera	
2000	Mohan Babu	Ramanna	Rayalaseema Ramanna Chowdary	
2000	Nagarjuna	Chandra Shekar Azad	Azad	
2000	Venkatesh	Raghu	Kalisundam Raa	
2001	Uday Kiran	Ravi	Nuvvu Nenu	
2001	Balakrishna	Narasimha Naidu	Narasimha Naidu	
2001	Mahesh Babu	Murari	Murari	
2001	Pawan Kalyan	Siddhartha Roy	Kushi	
2002	Chiranjeevi	Indrasena Reddy / Shankar Narayana	Indra	
2002	N. T. Rama Rao Jr.	Aadi Kesava Reddy	Aadi	
2002	Nagarjuna	Karthikeya	Santosham	
2002	Uday Kiran	Madhav	Nee Sneham	
2003	Mahesh Babu	Ajay Varma	Okkadu	
2003	N. T. Rama Rao Jr.	Simhadri / Singamalai	Simhadri	
2003	Chiranjeevi	Ravindranath Tagore	Tagore	
2003	Mahesh Babu	G. Seetaram	Nijam	
2003	Nandamuri Harikrishna	Seetayya / Sivayya	Seetayya	
2004	Chiranjeevi	Shankar Prasad	Shankar Dada M.B.B.S.	
2004	Allu Arjun	Arya	Arya	
2004	Nagarjuna	Ganesh	Mass	
2004	Prabhas	Venkat	Varsham	
2004	Rajendra Prasad	Raghuram	Aa Naluguru	
2005	Siddharth	Santosh	Nuvvostanante Nenoddantana	
2005	Mahesh Babu	Nanda Gopal / Pardhu	Athadu	
2005	Nagarjuna	Akhil	Super	
2005	Prabhas	Siva / Chatrapathi	Chhatrapati	
2005	Venkatesh	Raghavendra	Sankranthi	
2006	Mahesh Babu	Pandu / Krishna Manohar	Pokiri	
2006	N. T. Rama Rao Jr.	K. Ramakrishna	Rakhi	
2006	Nagarjuna	Kancherla Gopanna	Sri Ramadasu	
2006	Siddharth	Siddharth Addala	Bommarillu	
2007	N. T. Rama Rao Jr.	Raja	Yamadonga	
2007	Allu Arjun	Bala Govind	Desamuduru	
2007	Rajendra Prasad	Rajaji	Mee Sreyobhilashi	
2007	Srikanth	Mahesh / Bagavanthudu	Operation Duryodhana	
2007	Venkatesh	Ganesh	Aadavari Matalaku Arthale Verule	
2008	Allu Arjun	Krishna	Parugu	
2008	N. T. Rama Rao Jr.	Kantri	Kantri	
2008	Pawan Kalyan	Sanjay Saahu	Jalsa	
2008	Ram Pothineni	Chandrasekhar Rao	Ready	
2008	Ravi Teja	Krishna	Krishna	
2009	Ram Charan	Kala Bhairava / Harsha	Magadheera	
2009	Allu Arjun	Arya	Arya 2	
2009	Kamal Haasan	"The Anonymous Caller"	Eenadu	
2009	Prabhas	Chotu	Ek Niranjan	
2009	Ravi Teja	Kalyan	Kick	

=== 2010s ===
Year	Actor	Role(s)	Film	Ref.
2010	Allu Arjun	Anand "Cable" Raju	Vedam	
2010	Balakrishna	Narasimha / Srimannarayana	Simha	
2010	N. T. Rama Rao Jr.	Narasimha / Narasimha Chari	Adhurs	
2010	Naga Chaitanya	Karthik	Ye Maaya Chesave	
2010	Rana Daggubati	Arjun Prasad	Leader	
2011	Mahesh Babu	G. Ajay Kumar / Ballary Babu	Dookudu	
2011	Balakrishna	Sri Rama / Vishnu	Sri Rama Rajyam	
2011	Nagarjuna	Rajanna	Rajanna	
2011	Prabhas	Vicky	Mr. Perfect	
2011	Ram Pothineni	Sreenu	Kandireega	
2012	Pawan Kalyan	Venkataratnam Naidu / Gabbar Singh	Gabbar Singh	
2012	Mahesh Babu	Vijay Surya	Businessman	
2012	Nagarjuna	Mallikharjuna	Damarukam	
2012	Nithiin	Rahul	Ishq	
2012	Ram Charan	Betting Raj	Racha	
2013	Mahesh Babu	Chinnodu	Seethamma Vakitlo Sirimalle Chettu	
2013	Nithiin	Karthik	Gunde Jaari Gallanthayyinde	
2013	Pawan Kalyan	Gowtham Nanda / Siddhu	Attarintiki Daredi	
2013	Prabhas	Jai	Mirchi	
2013	Ram Charan	Charan / Siddharth Naayak	Naayak	
2014	Allu Arjun	Lucky	Race Gurram	
2014	Mohan Babu	Anna Garu	Rowdy	
2014	Nagarjuna	Seetharamudu / Nageswara Rao	Manam	
2014	Sharwanand	Raja Harishchandra Prasad	Run Raja Run	
2014	Venkatesh	Rambabu	Drushyam	
2015	Mahesh Babu	Harsha Vardhan	Srimanthudu	
2015	Allu Arjun	Viraj Anand	S/O Satyamurthy	
2015	N. T. Rama Rao Jr.	Daya	Temper	
2015	Nani	Lakkaraju	Bhale Bhale Magadivoy	
2015	Prabhas	Amarendra Baahubali / Mahendra Baahubali	Baahubali: The Beginning	
2016	N. T. Rama Rao Jr.	Abhiram	Nannaku Prematho	
2016	Allu Arjun	Gana	Sarrainodu	
2016	Naga Chaitanya	Vikram Vatsalya	Premam	
2016	Karthi	Seenu	Oopiri	
2016	Nani	Gautham / Jayaram	Gentleman	
2016	Ram Charan	K. Dhruva	Dhruva	
2017	Vijay Deverakonda	Arjun Reddy	Arjun Reddy	
2017	Balakrishna	Gautamiputra Satakarni	Gautamiputra Satakarni	
2017	Chiranjeevi	Kaththi Seenu/Konidela Siva Shankar Vara Prasad	Khaidi No. 150	
2017	N. T. Rama Rao Jr.	Jai Kumar/Lava Kumar/Kusa Kumar	Jai Lava Kusa	
2017	Prabhas	Amarendra Baahubali / Mahendra Baahubali	Baahubali 2: The Conclusion	
2017	Venkatesh	Aditya	Guru	
2018	Ram Charan	Chelluboina Chittibabu	Rangasthalam	
2018	Dulquer Salmaan	Gemini Ganesan	Mahanati	
2018	N. T. Rama Rao Jr.	Veera Raghava Reddy	Aravinda Sametha Veera Raghava	
2018	Mahesh Babu	Bharath Ram	Bharat Ane Nenu	
2018	Vijay Deverakonda	Vijay Govind	Geetha Govindam	
2019	AWARDS FUNCTION WAS SUSPENDED DUE TO COVID-19 PANDEMIC			

=== 2020s ===
Year	Actor	Role(s)	Film	Ref.
2020 / 21	Allu Arjun	Pushpa Raj	Pushpa: The Rise	
2020 / 21	Mahesh Babu	Ajay Krishna	Sarileru Neekevvaru	
2020 / 21	Naga Chaitanya	Revanth	Love Story	
2020 / 21	Nani	Shyam Singha Roy / Vasudev Ghanta	Shyam Singha Roy	
2020 / 21	Naveen Polishetty	Srikanth	Jathi Ratnalu	
2020 / 21	Rakshit Atluri	Mohan Rao	Palasa 1978	
2020 / 21	Panja Vaisshnav Tej	Aasirvadham	Uppena	
2022	N. T. Rama Rao Jr.	Komaram Bheem	RRR	
2022	Ram Charan	Alluri Sitarama Raju	RRR	
2022	Adivi Sesh	Sandeep Unnikrishnan	Major	
2022	Dulquer Salmaan	Ram	Sita Ramam	
2022	Chiranjeevi	Brahma Teja	Godfather	
2022	Pawan Kalyan	Sarhad Bheemla Nayak	Bheemla Nayak	
2022	Siddhu Jonnalagadda	Bala Gangadhar Tilak	DJ Tillu	
2023	Nani	Dharani	Dasara	
2023	Anand Devarakonda	Anand	Baby	
2023	Nandamuri Balakrishna	Nelakonda Bhagavanth Kesari	Bhagavanth Kesari	
2023	Chiranjeevi	Waltair Veerayya	Waltair Veerayya	
2023	Dhanush	Bala Gangadhar Tilak	Sir	
2023	Nani	Viraj	Hi Nanna	
2023	Naveen Polishetty	Siddhu Polishetty	Miss Shetty Mr Polishetty	
2023	Prakash Raj	Raghava Rao	Rangamarthanda	
2024	Allu Arjun	Pushpa Raj	Pushpa 2: The Rule	
2024	Dulquer Salmaan	Baskhar Kumar	Lucky Baskhar	
2024	N. T. Rama Rao Jr.	Devara/Vara	Devara: Part 1	
2024	Nani	Surya	Saripodhaa Sanivaaram	
2024	Siddhu Jonnalagadda	Bala Gangadhar Tilak	Tillu Square	
2024	Teja Sajja	Hanumanthu	Hanu-Man	

== Superlatives ==
Superlative	Actor	Record
Most awards	Chiranjeevi	7 wins
Most nominations	Chiranjeevi	21 nominations

- Chiranjeevi, with seven wins, has the most than any other actor in Telugu cinema. Mahesh Babu and Allu Arjun, with five wins each, have the second most awards, followed by Sobhan Babu and Venkatesh each with four wins. Akkineni Nageswara Rao, Kamal Haasan, Krishnam Raju, N. T. Rama Rao Jr., and Ram Charan have three wins each. Rajasekhar has two wins.
- Akkineni Nageswara Rao and Uday Kiran were the oldest and youngest actors to win the awards, at 68 and 21 respectively.
- Allu Arjun, Nani and Venkatesh are the three actors to win both Filmfare Award for Best Actor – Telugu and Filmfare Critics Award for Best Actor – South.
- Allu Arjun has won both the Best Actor and Best Supporting Actor awards.
- Allu Arjun is the only actor to have won Filmfare Awards South in three different acting categories: Best Actor, Best Supporting Actor and Best Actor – Critics.
- Allu Arjun became the first and only actor to win the Filmfare Award for Best Actor and National Film Award for Best Actor in a Leading Role for the same film, that is, Pushpa: The Rise.
- Sobhan Babu was the most victorious actor with four wins in the 70s. Kamal Haasan ruled the 80s with three wins. In the 90s, Chiranjeevi outperformed every other actors with three wins. Chiranjeevi and Mahesh Babu were the two successful actors with two wins each in the 2000s. Mahesh Babu continued to be the most successful actor in the 2010s with three wins.
- Two actors have won the awards in consecutive years; in chronological order, they are Sobhan Babu (1974–1976) and Chiranjeevi (1992–1993).
- Chiranjeevi has the most nominations with 21, followed by Venkatesh with 18, Nagarjuna with 16 and Mahesh Babu with 12.

== Multiple awards ==
- 7 wins: Chiranjeevi
- 5 wins: Mahesh Babu, Allu Arjun
- 4 wins: Sobhan Babu, Venkatesh
- 3 wins: Akkineni Nageswara Rao, Krishnam Raju, Kamal Haasan, N. T. R. Jr., Ram Charan
- 2 wins: Rajasekhar

== See also ==
- Filmfare Awards
- Telugu cinema

== Bibliography ==
- Ramachandran, T.M. (1973). Film world. Vol. 9.
- Collections. Update Video Publication. 1991.
- The Times of India directory and year book including who's who. Times of India Press. 1984.
