= Sati Savitri (1978 film) =

- Theatrical release poster
- Directed by: B. A. Subba Rao
- Screenplay by: Acharya Aatreya
- Based on: Life of Savitri & Satyavan
- Produced by: A. Shankar Reddy
- Starring: N. T. Rama Rao; Krishnam Raju; Vanisri
- Cinematography: K. S. Prasad; Ravikant Nagaich
- Edited by: Akkineni Sanjeevi
- Music by: Ghantasala; Pendyala
- Production company: Lalitha Siva Jyothi Studios
- Release date: 4 January 1978
- Country: India
- Language: Telugu

Sati Savitri is a 1978 Telugu-language Hindu mythological film directed by B. A. Subba Rao. It stars N. T. Rama Rao, Krishnam Raju, Vanisri and has music composed by Ghantasala & Pendyala Nageswara Rao. It is produced by A. Sankar Reddy under the Lalitha Siva Jyothi Studios. The film is based on the story of Savitri and Satyavan.

== Plot ==
The film begins with nature questioning the universe and saying death is inevitable, for which Yama God of Death protests vigorously. Just in, Narada lands where Yama affirms that no soul can escape from the eternal cycle of life. Narada walks on Trimurti but in vain to make sure. So, he prays to Aadi Parashakti, who spectacles that triumphs death, is Savitri, the daughter of Aswapathi of Madra Kingdom. Narada notifies Yama, which he dismisses since Savitri has a total life expectancy. Besides, Satyavantha, the son of Dyumatsena of Salwa Kingdom, has the destiny to die soon, one year after the wedding. On the eve of Navaratri, Aswapathi reaches Salwa with family as a guest of honor, where Savitri & Satyavantha crushes. Consequently, Narada gets an answer and affirms to Yama that Satyavantha is the rig of Savitri, which he challenges to make beyond reach.

Meanwhile, Rudrasena, the king of Bhudyala, itches to knit his daughter Chandraprabha with Satyavantha, which Dyumatsena denies because of his son's fate. Hence, Rudrasena conquers them by backstabbing and exiling Dyumatsena's couple by plucking their eyes. Satyavantha is outraged here, but Gautama Maharishi tranquilizes him, and they live as forest dwellers. Despite this, Savitri emphasized that she had decided, so Aswapathi headed to Dyumatsena. Whereat, Yama, in the Brahmin's guise, asserts Satyavantha's birth secret, but Savitri holds steady and announces to face the fact. Soon after the nuptial, Savitri proceeds to her in-laws and hermitage, relinquishing the luxury and serving them with adoration. Following this, Narada guides Savitri in her first step, which is performing a ritual. Yama conducts breakdowns to it and mandates Trinity & Ashtadikpakulu not to aid her. However, Savitri carries it out with her idolatry.

The day arises when Satyavantha moves in to cut wood from the forest, and Savitri follows him. Yama also sets foot to claim the soul when Satyavantha suddenly gets dizzy and collapses. Now, Savitri is behind Yama, depriving her lord's soul with big talk & reasoning of piety. Plus, with her grit, she makes the grade of Megha Mandalam, Sunyam, Surya Mandalam, Nakshatra Mandalam till Vaitarani. Across scales, Yama bestows Savitri with three boons, excluding her husband's life, and seeks to recoup the vision & kingdom of her in-laws, & the male progeny of her parents. Yet, she does not get out when Yama infuriates her. Thus, Savitri solicits & glorifies Aadi Parashakti before her Yama bows down. Currently, Savitri compels Yama to retrieve her husband as she earns the 3rd boon of a child, which is unfeasible without a husband. At last, the universe acclaims Savitri, who arrives on Earth with Satyavantha. Finally, the movie ends with the proclamation: Humans can attain divinity by perfecting their soul power.

== Cast ==
- N. T. Rama Rao as Yama Dharma Raju
- Krishnam Raju as Satyavanta
- Vanisri as Savitri
- Kanta Rao as Narada Maharshi
- Gummadi as Aswapathi Maharaju
- Mikkilineni as Lord Brahma
- Dhulipala as Dyumatsena Maharaju
- Prabhakar Reddy as Rudrasena Maharaju
- Allu Ramalingaiah as Chitra Gupta
- Raja Babu as Sharadudu
- K.V.Chalam as Astrologer
- P. J. Sarma as Lord Siva
- Nagaraju as Lord Vishnu
- Jamuna as Vijaya
- K. R. Vijaya as Adi Parashakti
- Anjali Devi as Aswapathi Maharaju's wife
- Pandari Bai as Dyumatsena Maharaju's wife
- Rama Prabha as Chitra
- Madhavi as Chandra Prabha
- Mamata as Goddess Saraswati
- Halam as Dancer
- Jaya Malini as Dancer
- Pushpa Kumari

== Music ==
Sati Savitri

Film score by Ghantasala Pendyala
- Genre: Soundtrack
- Label: EMI Columbia
- Producers: Ghantasala; Pendyala

Music was composed by Ghantasala and Pendyala. Music released by EMI Columbia Audio Company.

S.No	Song title	Lyrics	Singers	length
1	"Sri Karamulie"	C. Narayana Reddy	M. Balamuralikrishna	1:46
2	"Om Naadabindu Kaladhari"	Acharya Aatreya	Ghantasala	3:29
3	"Oogave Naa Thalli"	Acharya Aatreya	P. Susheela, P. Leela	4:42
4	"Emito Ee Pulakarintha"	Acharya Aatreya	P. Susheela	3:42
5	"Abhayamvamma"	Kosaraju	P. Susheela, L. R. Eswari	3:17
6	"Pamputhunamma"	Acharya Aatreya	P. Susheela, P. Leela	6:08
7	"Aaha Pellamante"	Acharya Aatreya	Madhavapeddi Ramesh, L.R.Eswari	3:16
8	"Yamini Bhamini"	Acharya Aatreya	P. Susheela, ML Narasimham	2:47
9	"Sakala Charachara Srushti"	C. Narayana Reddy	S. P. Balasubrahmanyam	
10	"Aadugaduguna Kothadanam"	Acharya Aatreya	P. Susheela, M. L. Narasimham	4:03
11	"Dharmama! Edi Dharmaraja"	Acharya Aatreya	P. Susheela	
12	"Yeh Maatha Jaganmaatha"	Acharya Aatreya	P. Susheela	2:17
13	"Sriman Maha Shakti Murthy"	Pilaka Ganapathi Sastry	S. P. Balasubrahmanyam	
