= Nagaraju =

Nagaraju may refer to:

- Bastipati Nagaraju Panchalingala, Indian politician
- Ganesh Nagaraju
- Kanneboyina Nagaraju
- Murder of Billipuram Nagaraju
- Nagaraju Shiva Puttaswamy
- Uday Nagaraju, Indian-born British politician

== See also ==
- Nagarjuna (disambiguation)
