= Jaganmohini (1978 film) =

- Directed by: B. Vittalacharya
- Produced by: B. Vittalacharya
- Starring: Jayamalini; Narasimha Raju; Dhulipala; Prabha; Sarathi
- Release date: 1978
- Country: India
- Language: Telugu

Jaganmohini is a 1978 Indian Telugu-language film produced and directed by B. Vittalacharya. It is a remake of the 1951 Kannada film of the same name. The film stars Narasimha Raju, Prabha and Jayamalini. Jaganmohini became a major hit and even performed better than the films of big stars. The movie had the best visual effects according to Indian standards at that time.

This is the story of woman betrayed by a king, who reappears in her next life as a ghost intent on possessing him. On the advice of a priest, the king marries a pious woman who matches her devotional prowess against the ghost's seductions and wins.

== Plot ==
Raja was a king in his previous life. When he goes to the forest once to hunt animals, he gets attracted to an orphan stick selling lady Mohini and lusts after her. He seduces her and enjoys having sex with her in the forest. After a week he leaves her in the forest itself promising that he would return to marry her and will make her his queen. But Raja is a lustful womanizer and he just betrayed Mohini. Knowing this Mohini commits suicide vowing that she will return to get him in his next life.

Raja in his next birth goes to the same forest to drink water where Jaganmohini, now a ghost, appears to him and lures him with her beauty. But he is married to another pious woman. She regains him by praying to her Goddess, whom she believes in strongly. In the process, she is turned to into the form of an old woman and later into the form of a snake by Jaganmohini to obstruct her prayers. But, with the help of another pious ghost, and her brother-in-law, who is also turned into a sheep by Jaganmohini, she regains her original form and finishes her prayers at Srisailam. Jagan Mohini at last gets her "moksham" and goes to heaven.

== Cast ==
- Savitri as Raja's mother
- Jayamalini as Jaganmohini
- Narasimha Raju as Raja
- Prabha as Raja's wife
- Vijayalakshmi
- Dhulipala Seetharama Sastry as Raja's father
- Sarathi as Raja's friend
- A. Satyanarayana
- Athili Lakshmi
- Mukkamala
- Balakrishna
- Jayachandran
- Anita
- Duttaluri RamaRao

== Reception ==
The Indian Express felt unlike the previous films of Vittalcharya which had clear storylines, this one was "utterly confusing" and called the narration incoherent while also panning the dubbing as poor, songs as unappealing and acting as miserable.
