= Sri Vinayaka Vijayamu =

- Theatrical release poster
- Directed by: Kamalakara Kameswara Rao
- Written by: Bonam Anjaneyulu
- Produced by: Jagarlamudi Radhakrishna Murthy; N. Narayana Swamy; P. Rambabu
- Starring: Krishnam Raju; Vanisri; Kaikala Satyanarayana
- Cinematography: K. S. Prasad
- Edited by: Veerappa
- Music by: S. Rajeswara Rao
- Production company: Jaganmatha Arts
- Release date: 22 December 1979
- Country: India
- Language: Telugu

Sri Vinayaka Vijayamu is a 1979 Telugu-language Hindu mythological film directed by Kamalakara Kameswara Rao and produced by Jagarlamudi Radhakrishna Murthy under Jaganmatha Arts. The film stars Krishnam Raju, Rama Krishna, Vanisri, M. G. V. Madan Gopal, Kaikala Satyanarayana in the lead roles. The music was composed by S. Rajeswara Rao. The lyrics were written by Devulapalli Krishnasastri, Arudra, Veeturi and Kosaraju. The film is about Hindu deity Ganesha's life from his birth till he tamed Mushikasura, a rakshasa who later became Ganesha's mount. The film was a major commercial success.

== Cast ==
- Krishnam Raju as Lord Shiva
- Rama Krishna as Lord Vishnu
- Vanisri as Devi Parvati
- M. G. V. Madangopal as Sri Ganesha
- Kaikala Satyanarayana as Mushikasura
- Prabha as Priyamvada
- Nagaraju as Narada
- Deepa as Vaishali
- Dhulipala as Shukracharya
- Radhakrishna Murthy
- Pushpalatha as Tripura Sundari
- Padmanabham as Sandehasura
- Nara Venkateswara Rao as Sri Indra
- Baby Lakshmi Sudha as young Ganesha
- Jayamalini
- Rohini as Kumara Swamy
