= Manchiki Maro Peru =

- Theatrical release poster
- Directed by: C. S. Rao
- Screenplay by: C. S. Rao
- Story by: Aarudhra
- Produced by: M. Manohar
- Starring: N. T. Rama Rao; Krishnam Raju; Padmapriya
- Cinematography: Ishan Arya
- Edited by: Kotagiri Gopal Rao
- Music by: S. Rajeswara Rao
- Production company: Sree Ramakrishna Films
- Release date: 9 December 1976
- Running time: 146 minutes
- Country: India
- Language: Telugu

Manchiki Maro Peru (transl. Another Name for Goodness) is a 1976 Indian Telugu-language action drama film, produced by M. Manohar under the Sree Ramakrishna Films banner and directed by C. S. Rao. It stars N. T. Rama Rao, Krishnam Raju, Padmapriya and features music composed by S. Rajeswara Rao.

== Cast ==
- N. T. Rama Rao as Jayanth
- Krishnam Raju as Kiran
- Padmapriya as Neelima
- Satyanarayana as Ananda Mohan / Gangulu
- Ramakrishna as Ravi
- Prabhakar Reddy as Ramadasu & Bhujangam (Dual Role)
- Nagabhushanam as Bhusaiah
- Allu Ramalingaiah as Seshayya
- Mukkamala as Manager
- Sarath Babu as Ashok
- G. Varalakshmi as Jayanth's mother
- Prabha as Chandrika
- Jayamalini as Chenchela
- Chalapathi Rao as judge
- Narra Venkateswara Rao

== Soundtrack ==
Music composed by S. Rajeswara Rao.

S. No.	Song title	Lyrics	Singers	length
1	"Jaya Jaya Rama Hare"	C. Narayana Reddy	S. P. Balasubrahmanyam	2:23
2	"Chekkili Navvindi"	C. Narayana Reddy	V. Ramakrishna, P. Susheela	3:58
3	"Kallato Rasinde Kavita"	C. Narayana Reddy	V. Ramakrishna, P. Susheela	4:14
4	"Virisina Oohala"	Krishna	V. Ramakrishna, P. Susheela	4:02
5	"Vippe Monagadu"	Aarudhra	L. R. Eeswari	
