= Nipputho Chelagatam =

1982 Telugu film by Kommineni Seshagiri Rao

- నిప్పుతో చెలగాటం
- Directed by: Kommineni Seshagiri Rao
- Produced by: Y. V. Rao
- Starring: Krishnam Raju; Sarada; Jayasudha; Sarath Babu
- Music by: Satyam
- Release date: 1982
- Country: India
- Language: Telugu

Nipputho Chelagatam (transl. Playing with fire) is a 1982 Telugu language action drama film directed by Kommineni Seshagiri Rao and produced by Y. V. Rao. The film stars Krishnam Raju, Sarada, Jayasudha and Sarath Babu. The film is a remake of 1978 Hindi film Karmayogi. The music was composed by Satyam.

== Cast ==
- Krishnam Raju as Shankar/Mohan (Dual role)
- Sharada as Durga Devi
- Jayasudha as Rekha
- Sarath Babu as Ravi
- Geetha as Radha
- Kavitha as Kavita
- Kanta Rao as Radha's father;
- Rao Gopal Rao as Jagapati
- Allu Rama Lingaiah as Gajapati
- Vijayachander as church father
- Sarathi as Police Inspector
- Balakrishna as constable
- Chidatala Appa Rao
