= Sardar Dharmanna =

- Directed by: Bairisetty Bhaskara Rao
- Produced by: Yalamanchili Saibabu
- Starring: Krishnam Raju; Vishnuvardhan; Jayasudha; Radhika; Mohan Babu; Rajani
- Cinematography: Benjamin
- Edited by: P. Bhakthavathsalam
- Music by: M. Ranga Rao
- Release date: 22 March 1987
- Country: India
- Language: Telugu

Sardar Dharmanna is a 1987 Telugu language drama film directed by Bairisetty Bhaskara Rao and produced by Yalamanchili Saibabu. The film stars Krishnam Raju, Vishnuvardhan, Jayasudha, Radhika, Mohan Babu, and Rajani. The film had musical score by M. Ranga Rao.

== Cast ==
- Krishnam Raju
- Vishnuvardhan
- Jayasudha
- Radhika
- Mohan Babu
- Rajani
