= Babulugaadi Debba =

- Theatrical release poster
- Directed by: K. Vasu
- Story by: M. D. Sundar
- Produced by: Vadde Sobhanadri
- Starring: Krishnam Raju; Sridevi; Radhika
- Cinematography: Kannappa
- Edited by: G. G. Krishna Rao
- Music by: J. V. Raghavulu
- Production company: Vijaya Madhavi Pictures
- Release date: 16 February 1981
- Country: India
- Language: Telugu

Babulugaadi Debba is a 1981 Telugu-language action drama film directed by K. Vasu starring Krishnam Raju, Sridevi and Radhika. The soundtrack was composed by J. V. Raghavulu.

== Cast ==
- Krishnam Raju as Venu/Babulu
- Sridevi as Radha
- Radhika as Gowri
- Prabhakar Reddy
- Jaggayya as Jagannath
- Rao Gopal Rao
- Tyagaraju as Surendra
- Giri Babu as Rambabu
- Sarathi as Ramu
- Baby Meena as Radha
- Sakshi Ranga Rao as Panakalu
- Suthivelu
- Jyothi Lakshmi

== Soundtrack ==
No.	Title	Singer(s)	Length
1.	"Pantulamma Pantulamma"	S. P. Balasubrahmanyam, P. Susheela	4:14
2.	"Vayasu Bussu Mandi"	S. P. Balasubrahmanyam, P. Susheela	4:30
3.	"Hari Om"	S. P. Balasubrahmanyam, P. Susheela	4:43
4.	"Challona Naggesi"	S. P. Balasubrahmanyam, P. Susheela	4:08
