= Puli Bidda =

1981 Telugu sports drama film

- Theatrical release poster
- Directed by: V. Madhusudhana Rao
- Story by: Anjaneya Pushpanand
- Based on: Thayige Thakka Maga
- Produced by: Nachu Seshagiri Rao
- Starring: Krishnam Raju; Sridevi
- Cinematography: V. S. R. Swamy
- Edited by: D. Venkataratnam
- Music by: Chakravarthy
- Production company: Heramba Chitra Mandir
- Release date: 24 April 1981
- Country: India
- Language: Telugu

Puli Bidda (transl. Son of the Tiger) is a 1981 Telugu-language sports drama film directed by V. Madhusudhana Rao and produced by N. Seshagiri Rao under Heramba Chitra Mandir. The film stars Krishnam Raju and Sridevi. It is a remake of the 1978 Kannada film Thayige Thakka Maga. The soundtrack was composed by Chakravarthy. Krishnam Raju acted as a boxer in the film.

== Cast ==
- Krishnam Raju as Kumar aka Chanti
- Sridevi as Mala
- Sowcar Janaki as Annapurna
- Anjali Devi as Vishalaakshi
- Kaikala Satyanarayana as Sasibhushana Rao
- Prabhakar Reddy as Robert
- Ceylon Manohar as Manohar
- Arja Janardhan Rao as Gopinath
- Narra Venkateswara Rao as Doctor

== Soundtrack ==
Soundtrack was composed by Chakravarthy.

- "Veyyi Veyyi Vanthena" - S. P. Balasubrahmanyam, P. Susheela
- "Nadumaa Kunneledi Nadumaa" - S.P. Balasubramaniam, P. Susheela
- "Manasanthu" - S.P. Balasubramaniam, P. Susheela
- "Kasee Viswanatha" - S.P. Balasubramaniam
- "Bujjipapa" - P. Susheela
