= Sita Ramulu =

- Theatrical release poster
- Directed by: Dasari Narayana Rao
- Produced by: Jayakrishna
- Starring: Krishnam Raju; Jaya Prada
- Cinematography: VSR Swamy
- Edited by: GG Krishna Rao
- Music by: Satyam
- Production company: Jayakrishna Movies
- Release date: 1 August 1980
- Running time: 145 minutes
- Country: India
- Language: Telugu

Sita Ramulu is a 1980 Telugu-language drama film directed by Dasari Narayana Rao starring Krishnam Raju, Jaya Prada and Mohan Babu. The music was composed by Satyam. The song "Toli Sandhya Velalo" is a chartbuster and is remembered even today. This film is a remake of the Tamil film Kanavan Manaivi.

Relangi Narasimha Rao was assistant director of the film.

== Plot ==
Ram, a labour union leader, falls in love with his employer, Sita, and eventually marries her. However, their marital bliss is short-lived as her evil manager tries to create a rift between them.

== Cast ==
- Krishnam Raju as Ramu
- Jaya Prada as Sita
- Mohan Babu as Ravi
- Kaikala Satyanarayana as Ramu's father
- Allu Ramalingaiah as Ravi's father
- K. V. Chalam as constable
- Mikkilineni
- R. Narayana Murthy
- Chalapathi Rao
- Narra Venkateswara Rao
- Sukumari as Ramu's mother
- Dubbing Janaki
- Chidatala Appa Rao
- Jayamalini as item number
- Jyothi Lakshmi as item number

== Soundtrack ==
The music was composed by Satyam and released by Saregama.

Sita Ramulu

Soundtrack album by Satyam
- Released: 1980
- Recorded: 1980
- Genre: Soundtrack
- Length: 22:39
- Label: Saregama
- Producer: Chellapilla Satyam

Satyam chronology
Nakili Manishi (1980)	Sita Ramulu (1980)	Prema Tarangalu (1980)

Track list
No.	Title	Lyrics	Singer(s)	Length
1.	"Tholi Sanje Velalo"	Dasari Narayana Rao	S. P. Balasubrahmanyam	4:51
2.	"Bunga Moothi"	Rajasree	S. P. Balasubrahmanyam, P. Susheela	3:11
3.	"Palikinadhi Pilichinadi"	Acharya Aatreya	S. P. Balasubrahmanyam, P. Susheela	5:06
4.	"Rungu Rungu Billa"	Veturi	S. P. Balasubrahmanyam, P. Susheela	3:14
5.	"Tholi Sanje Velalo (Female)"	Dasari Narayana Rao	P. Susheela	3:03
6.	"Yemandoy Srimathigaru"	Dasari Narayana Rao	S. P. Balasubrahmanyam, Jaya Prada	3:14
Total length:				22:39
