= Alludu Pattina Bharatam =

- Directed by: K. Vishwanath
- Written by: Jandhyala
- Produced by: D. V. S. Raju
- Starring: Krishnam Raju, Jayasudha, Kavita and Nagabhushanam
- Music by: Chakravarthy
- Distributed by: D. V. S. Productions
- Release date: 1980
- Country: India
- Language: Telugu

Alludu Pattina Bharatam is a 1980 Telugu-language drama film directed by K. Viswanath and produced by D. V. S. Raju under D. V. S. Productions. The film stars Krishnam Raju, Jayasudha, Kavita and Nagabhushanam. The music was composed by Chakravarthy. The dialogues were written by Jandhyala. The lyrics were written by C. Narayana Reddy and Veturi.

== Cast ==
- Krishnam Raju as Mutyalu
- Jayasudha as Rekha
- Kavita as Radha
- Nagabhushanam
- Ranganath as Ramakrishna, lecturer
- Rama Prabha as Venkumamba aka Mamba
- Padmanabham as Cedric Anthony De'Costa, Mamba's servant
- Allu Rama Lingaiah as Simhachalam
- P. L. Narayana as Dasu, Mamba's assistant
- Sakshi Ranga Rao as lecturer
- Mallikarjuna Rao

== Soundtrack ==
All music is composed by K. Chakravarthy

Track list
No.	Title	Lyrics	Singer(s)	Length
1.	"Chukkalenno"	C. Narayana Reddy	S. P. Balasubrahmanyam, P. Susheela	4:25
2.	"Garam Garam"	C. Narayana Reddy	S. P. Balasubrahmanyam	3:39
3.	"Palikenu Nalo"	Veturi	S. P. Balasubrahmanyam, P. Susheela	4:26
4.	"Pantamelane"	Veturi	S. P. Balasubrahmanyam	3:54
5.	"Anjana chandan"	Dasam Gopal Krishna	S.P. Sailaja	3.50
Total length:				16:27
