= Bebbuli =

- Theatrical release poster
- Directed by: V. Madhusudhana Rao
- Produced by: Vadde Sobhanadri
- Starring: Krishnam Raju; Sujatha
- Music by: J. V. Raghavulu
- Release date: 1980
- Country: India
- Language: Telugu

Bebbuli (transl. Tiger) is a 1980 Telugu-language drama film directed by V. Madhusudhana Rao and produced by Vadde Sobhanadri. The film stars Krishnam Raju and Sujatha in the lead roles. The film had music by J. V. Raghavulu.

== Cast ==
- Krishnam Raju as Raja
- Sujatha as Lalitha
- Rao Gopal Rao as Jagannatham
- Prabhakar Reddy as Seshu
- Chalapathi Rao as Basavudu aka 'Chi Chi Daba Chi Chi' Swamy
- Mikkilineni as Rangaiah, Lalitha's grandfather
- Bhanu Chander as Shankar
- Balayya as Temple Priest
- Rajasulochana as Jagannatham's moll
- Krishna Kumari as Yashoda
- Sarathi as Jagannatham's secretary
- Annapurna as Parvathi
- Bob Christo as Bob Christo, Assassin sent to kill Raja
- Jyothi Lakshmi
