= Bala Mitrula Katha =

- Theatrical release poster
- Directed by: K. VaraprasadaRao
- Produced by: S. V. NarasimhaRao
- Starring: Jaggayya; Gummadi; Krishnam Raju; Nagabhushanam
- Music by: Satyam
- Release date: 1973
- Country: India
- Language: Telugu

Bala Mitrula Katha is a 1973 Telugu-language film directed by K. Varaprasada Rao, starring Jaggayya, Krishnam Raju, Gummadi and Nagabhushanam. It is a story of the friendship of two kids of different social statuses and the support of their teachers amid the political and village backdrop.

== Plot ==
Dharmayya and Satyam are friends and favourite students of Bhavani Prasad. Satyam is the son of Bhushayya, a rich landlord. Dharmayya is the son of Kotayya, a labourer. Nagaraju, an unruly kid, is the son of Papayya, the village president. The animosity between landlords Papayya and Bhushayya is reflected in the lives of their children. Nagaraju challenges Satyam about their ability to buy tickets for a circus show. Satyam unsuccessfully tries to get money from his parents, Bhushayya and Santamma. As part of the plan to earn money, Dharmayya lies that Satyam committed suicide. Santamma dies of shock, and Satyam and Dharmayya decide to never lie again.

Prasad files a case against Papayya about mixing salt in ammonia fertilizer. Dharmayya tells the Collector, and it causes Papayya to lose his reputation and his father Kotayya to lose his job. Dharmayya escapes from the house and hides in Bhushayya's cattle house to avoid the ire of his father. Kotayya searches for his son and reaches the cattle house with a lamp, and the grass catches on fire. Bhushayya's group catches Kotayya and misunderstands that Papayya sent him. Satyam comes to the rescue and gives evidence before the Collector to save Kotayya. None of the village elders, Papayya, Bhushayya, and Kotayya, can understand the intensity of the friendship between Dharmayya and Satyam and their commitment to the truth. Satyam and Dharmayya escape from the village and face several problems in the city. Prasad discovers that militant revolutionaries led by his childhood friend Bhanu (Krishnam Raju) are going to kill Papayya, and he tells Satyam and Dharma to inform Papayya. Militants and police face a fight, and the rebel leader is injured and caught. The movie ends with village elders Bhushayya, Papayya, and Kotayya recognising the need for honest people like Dharmayya and Satyam in the village.

== Cast ==
- Master Devanand as Dharmayya
- Master Surendra as Satyam
- Krishnam Raju as Bhanu
- Jaggayya as Bhavani Prasad
- Gummadi as Kotayya
- Mikkilineni as Bhushayya
- Nagabhushanam as Papayya
- Allu Ramalingaiah as Mallayya
- Rajababu as Appa Rao / Mohammed Ali
- Suryakantham
- Seshagiri Rao
- Kasinath
- Prasad
- Raja Rammohan
- Prakash Rao
- Chalapathi Rao as Bhanu's follower
- Gokina Rama Rao as Police Inspector
- Jayakumari
- Hemalata as Santamma
- Jyothi Lakshmi
- Sandhya Rani
- Suseela
- Bhanumathi
- Lakshmi
- Indira

== Soundtrack ==
All songs were composed by Satyam, and written by the lyricists C. Narayana Reddy and Veturi.

- "Gunna Mamidi Komma Meedha Goollu Rendunnayi" - written by C. Narayana Reddy and sung by S. Janaki. This song is the most popular song on the track and remained as the cult classic song for the next generations.
- "Ranzu Bhale Ramachiluka"
- "Ice fruit Babu Ice Fruit"
