= Andadu Aagadu =

1979 film

Andadu Aagadu (transl. He Can Not Be Caught and He Does Not Stop) is a 1979 Telugu language spy thriller film directed by S. D. Lal and produced by Shrikant Nahata under Shrikant Pictures. The film stars Krishnam Raju and Latha Sethupathi. The film has music composed by Satyam. The film is a remake of the 1973 Bollywood film, Keemat starring Dharmendra and Rekha. Krishnam Raju acted in a spy role which is parallel to James Bond.

== Cast ==
- Krishnam Raju as Vijay, Agent 116
- Latha Sethupathi as Latha
- Mohan Babu as Bhujangam
- Kavitha as Padma
- Ceylon Manohar as Ranjith
- Vijayalalitha as Menaka
- Ranganath as S.I. Mohan
- Rajababu as Navarasa Raju aka Rasam
- Allu Ramalingaiah as Kodandam
- Potti Prasad as Punyakoti
- Sakshi Ranga Rao as Ling Papa Rao
- Kantha Rao as Inspector General of Police

== Soundtrack ==
The music was composed by Sathyam. Lyrics by Veturi, C. Narayana Reddy and Aarudra.

- "Chikkadapalli Chinadhana" - P. Susheela
- "Yemani Cheppedi" - S. Janaki
- "Ee Kode Vayasu" - S. Janaki
- "Ee Santaloo" - S. Janaki, Chorus
