= Brahma Nayudu (film) =

1987 film by Dasari Narayana Rao

- Directed by: Dasari Narayana Rao
- Starring: Krishnam Raju
- Music by: J. V. Raghavulu
- Release date: 1987
- Country: India
- Language: Telugu

Brahma Nayudu is a 1987 Indian Telugu-language action drama film directed by Dasari Narayana Rao. The film stars Krishnam Raju, Sujatha and Suhasini. The music was composed by J. V. Raghavulu. This is actor Srihari's debut movie.

== Cast ==
- Krishnam Raju as Brahma Nayudu
- Sujatha as Brahma Nayudu's sister
- Suhasini
- Gummadi
- Kaikala Satyanarayana
- P. L. Narayana
- Thyagaraju
- Nagesh Babu
- Nirmala
- Sri Lakshmi
- Srihari
- Hari Prasad

== Music ==
Song title	Singer(s)
"Evadura Ninnu"	S. P. Balasubrahmanyam, P. Susheela
"Gudu Gudu Gunjam"	S. P. Balasubrahmanyam, P. Susheela
"Ayyo Neeti Meeda"	S. P. Balasubrahmanyam, P. Susheela
"Nenemi Sethuro Rama"	S. P. Balasubrahmanyam, P. Susheela
"Yendiro Ramjugada"	S. P. Balasubrahmanyam, P. Susheela
