= Madhura Swapnam =

1982 film by K. Raghavendra Rao

- Poster
- Directed by: K. Raghavendra Rao
- Based on: The Citadel by A. J. Cronin
- Produced by: Uppalapati Surya Narayana Raju
- Starring: Krishnam Raju; Jaya Prada; Jayasudha; Jaggayya; Kaikala Satyanarayana; Baby Rohini
- Cinematography: K.S. Prakash Rao
- Edited by: D. Venkata Ratnam
- Music by: Satyam
- Distributed by: Lakshmi Films
- Release date: 14 January 1982
- Country: India
- Language: Telugu

Madhura Swapnam (transl. Sweet Dream)is a 1982 Telugu-language film based on A. J. Cronin's novel, The Citadel. It was directed by K. Raghavendra Rao and stars Krishnam Raju, Jaya Prada and Jayasudha in the lead. The movie is also inspired by Yaddanapudi Sulochana Rani's novel of the same name. This is the remake of 1972 Bengali film Jiban Saikate.

== Cast ==
- Krishnam Raju as Gopala Krishna
- Jayasudha as Radha
- Jaya Prada as Kalyani
- Jaggayya as Anand
- Kaikala Satyanarayana as Raja Shekharam
- Ranganath as Ramesh
- Prabhakar Reddy as Veerayya
- Chalapathi Rao as Dayanidhi
- Giri Babu
- Sakshi Ranga Rao
- Sarathi
- C. H. Narayana Rao
- Potti Prasad
- Nirmalamma as Kantamma
- Rohini as Sitalu
