= Talli Kodukula Anubandham =

- Theatrical release poster
- Directed by: K. S. R. Das
- Written by: Cheruva Anjaneya Shastri (Story); Jandhyala (Dialogues)
- Screenplay by: Adurthi Narasimha Murthy
- Produced by: R. M. Subramanyam
- Starring: Krishnam Raju; Jaya Pradha; K. R. Vijaya; Jaggayya; Kaikala Satyanarayana
- Cinematography: S. S. Lal
- Edited by: Sambashiva Rao
- Music by: Satyam
- Production company: Sri Umayambikai Combines
- Release date: 18 December 1981
- Country: India
- Language: Telugu

Talli Kodukula Anubandham (transl. Mother-son bonding) is a Telugu film released in 1982, starring Krishnam Raju, Jaya Pradha, K. R. Vijaya, Jaggayya, Kaikala Satyanarayana and others. The film was remade in Kannada as Chinnadantha Maga (1983), with Vishnuvardhan.

== Cast ==
- Krishnam Raju
- Jaya Pradha
- K. R. Vijaya
- Jaggayya
- Kaikala Satyanarayana
