= Maa Nannaku Pelli =

- Directed by: E. V. V. Satyanarayana
- Written by: Janardhana Maharshi
- Produced by: Arjuna Raju
- Starring: Krishnam Raju; Srikanth; Simran; Ambika; Kota Srinivasa Rao
- Music by: Koti
- Release date: 5 December 1997
- Country: India
- Language: Telugu

Maa Nannaku Pelli (transl. My father is getting married) is a 1997 Telugu-language drama film directed by E. V. V. Satyanarayana and written by Janardhana Maharshi. The film features Krishnam Raju, Srikanth, Simran and Ambika in the lead roles. It was the first film to be shot entirely at Ramoji Film City. The film also marked a breakthrough in the career of actor M. S. Narayana. It received two Nandi Awards.

== Plot ==
Balaraju (Srikanth) is the only son of Raghava Raju (Krishnam Raju) and grandson of Subbaraju (Kota Srinivasa Rao). Balaraju lost his mother when he was a child. Raghava Raju brings him up with great care so that he will not miss his mother. He does not consider marrying another lady because he thinks that it might deprive his love for his son.

Balaraju falls in love with a girl, Lahari (Simran) during a flight journey. He also gets his love accepted by everyone. One day, he happens to read his father's diary and realizes that his father had suppressed feelings for a lady called Sravani (Ambika). He wants to get his father married to Sravani along with his marriage. He is even ready to sacrifice his love when Lahari misunderstands his intentions. Knowing his son's broken love, Raghava Raju tries to send Sravani far away so that his son can get married without any problems. But Subbaraju and Balaraju stop this and convince Raghava Raju. Finally, Sravani understands his intentions, and all ends well.

== Cast ==
- Krishnam Raju as Raja Kalidindi Raghava Raju
- Srikanth as Bala Raju
- Simran as Lahari
- Ambika as Sravani
- Kota Srinivasa Rao as Subba Raju
- Chalapathi Rao as Sarvarayudu
- Mallikarjuna Rao as Anjaneyulu
- M. S. Narayana as Sravani's father
- Raja Ravindra as Bala Raju's friend
- Namala Murthy

== Soundtrack ==
All music is composed by Koti

Track list
No.	Title	Lyrics	Singer(s)	Length
1.	"Morning Nunchi"	Chandrabose	S. P. Balasubrahmanyam	4:48
2.	"O Jabilamma"	Veturi	S. P. Balasubrahmanyam, Sujatha	4:50
3.	"Adirindhira"	Shanmukha Sharma	S. P. Balasubrahmanyam, Nagur Babu	4:59
4.	"Devudi Gullo"	Sirivennela Seetharama Sastry	S. P. Balasubrahmanyam	4:42
5.	"Ninnu Choosi"	Sirivennela Seetharama Sastry	S. P. Balasubrahmanyam, Sujatha	4:57
6.	"Gichcham Gichcham"	Shanmukha Sharma	S. P. Balasubrahmanyam, K. S. Chithra	4:33
Total length:				28:51

== Reception ==
A critic from Andhra Today opined that "'Maa Naannaki Pelli' is a nice movie built around a thought provoking theme under the able direction of E.V.V.Satyanarayana".

== Awards ==
Nandi Awards - 1997

- Best Home-viewing Feature Film - M. Arjuna Raju
- Best Male Comedian - M. S. Narayana
