= Parivartana (1975 film) =

Indian Telugu romance film directed by K. Hemambaradhara Rao

- Release date: 1975
- Country: India
- Language: Telugu

Parivartana (translation:Change) is a 1975 Telugu romance film directed by K. Hemambaradhara Rao. The film was made under Subhashini Art Pictures The film stars Krishnam Raju, Jamuna, Kanchana and Lakshmi in the lead roles. The music was composed by T. Chalapathi Rao. It is the debut film of Madhavapeddi Suresh, he played accordion for the film.

== Cast ==
- Krishnam Raju
- Jamuna
- Kanchana
- Lakshmi
- Chandra Mohan

== Soundtrack ==
- "Evaru Neevu Evaru Nenu"-
- "Ontaritananiki Ika Selavu"-
- "Gudilo Oka Deepam"-
- "Cheyyi Choosi Chebutava Bava" -
- "Medalona Murisevaaru" -
- "Vinipinchana Vinipinchana"-
