= Uppalapati Surya Narayana Raju =

Indian film producer

U. Surya Narayana Raju
- Born: Uppalapati Venkata Suryanarayana Raju; 13 December 1948; Mogalthur, Andhra Pradesh, India
- Died: 12 February 2010 (aged 61); Mogalthur, Andhra Pradesh, India
- Occupation: Film producer
- Spouse: Siva Kumari
- Children: 3 including, Prabhas
- Relatives: Krishnam Raju (brother)

Uppalapati Surya Narayana Raju (13 December 1948 – 12 February 2010) was an Indian film producer. He was the younger brother of Krishnam Raju and father of Prabhas. His movie banner was Gopi Krishna Movies and he was the producer of Bhakta Kannappa.

== Personal life ==
Suryanarayana Raju was born in Mogalthur, West Godavari District, Andhra Pradesh, to Veera Venkata Satyanarayana Raju.

He died in 2010 due to lung cancer.

== Filmography ==
=== As producer ===
Year	Film
1974	Krishnaveni
1976	Bhakta Kannappa
1977	Amara Deepam
1978	Mana Voori Pandavulu
1982	Madhura Swapnam
1982	Trishulam
1984	Bobbili Brahmanna
1986	Dharm Adhikari
1986	Tandra Paparayudu
2009	Billa
