= Aadavaallu Meeku Joharlu (1981 film) =

Indian Telugu-language film

- Poster
- Directed by: K. Balachander
- Written by: K. Balachander
- Produced by: T. Visweswara Rao
- Starring: Krishnam Raju; Jayasudha
- Cinematography: B. S. Lokanath
- Edited by: N. R. Kittu
- Music by: K. V. Mahadevan
- Release date: 15 January 1981
- Country: India
- Language: Telugu

Aadavaallu Meeku Joharlu (transl. Salutation to you, ladies) is a 1981 Indian Telugu-language film directed by K. Balachander, starring Krishnam Raju, Jayasudha and Bhanu Chander, with Chiranjeevi played a guest role while movie starting.

== Cast ==
- Krishnam Raju as Narsimha
- Jayasudha as P. Rani
- Bhanu Chander
- Saritha as Papayamma
- Chiranjeevi (Cameo)
- Y. Vijaya
- Jayamalini
- Tyagaraju
- Sakshi Rangarao as teacher
- Prasad Rao
- Krishna Chaitanya
- Master Raju
- Shyamala
- Lakshmi Chitra
- Asha Lata
- Raghavan
- Bharat Kumar
- Jit Mohan Mitra
- Basha

== Soundtrack ==
Soundtrack was composed by K. V. Mahadevan.

All tracks are written by Aacharya aatreya.

No.	Title	Lyrics	Length
1.	"Aadavallu Joharlu" (S p balasubrahmanyam)	Aacharya aatreya
2.	"Kaalani Mantale" (P.suseela)	Aatreya
3.	"Okasaari" (S.janaki)	Atreya
4.	"Papikondalona" (P.Suseela)	Aatreya
