= Raraju (1984 film) =

- Directed by: G. Rammohan Rao
- Produced by: Vadde Sobhanadri
- Starring: Krishnam Raju; Vijayashanti; Sharada
- Music by: J. V. Raghavulu
- Release date: 1984
- Country: India
- Language: Telugu

Raraju is a 1984 Telugu action film directed by G. Rammohan Rao and produced by Vadde Sobhanadri. The film stars Krishnam Raju, Vijayashanti, Sharada, Suman, Jaggayya and Kaikala Satyanarayana in the lead roles. The film has music composed by J. V. Raghavulu.

== Plot ==
This is the story of Raraju, an orphan, grows up in a forest. He grows up with local tribes and becomes their leader. A mafia Mastan Rao smuggles the woods and blames to the tribal. Raraju fights for the life and safety of the tribal against Mastan Rao.

== Cast ==
- Krishnam Raju as Raraju
- Vijayashanti
- Sharada as Parvati
- Suman as Venu
- Siva Krishna as Krishna Moorti
- Jaggayya as Ravindra
- Kaikala Satyanarayana as Mastan Rao
- Jayanthi as Kalyani
- Prabhakar Reddy as Parvati's father
- Mucherla Aruna as Jyoti
- Giri Babu as Mastan Rao's henchman
- Nutan Prasad as Patrudu
- Sri Lakshmi as Fakiramma
- Raavi Kondala Rao
- Silk Smitha
