= Manavudu Danavudu =

- Theatrical release poster
- Directed by: P. Chandrasekhara Reddy
- Written by: Modukuri Johnson
- Produced by: P. Chinnapa Reddy
- Starring: Sobhan Babu; Sarada; Krishna Kumari
- Edited by: V. Ankireddy
- Music by: G.Aswathama
- Release date: 1972
- Country: India
- Language: Telugu

Manavudu Danavudu is a 1972 Indian Telugu-language film directed by P. Chandrasekhara Reddy. The film stars Sobhan Babu, Sarada and Krishna Kumari. It was produced by P. Chinnapa Reddy of Ushasri Films.

Sobhan Babu played a dual role as Doctor Venu during the daytime and as Killer Jagan during the nighttime. The film was remade in Hindi by Doondi as Adha Din Adhi Raat (1977) and in Tamil as Engal Thanga Raja (1973) and in Malayalam as Ithaanente Vazhi (1978).

== Plot ==
Seeta (Krishna Kumari) is a poor woman who lives with her ailing mother and younger brother Venu. She works as a laborer for Bhujangam (Satyanarayana), a malicious man, and uses that money to feed the family. Bhujangam eyes Seeta and wants to trap her so he uses a woman Kanakam to lure Seeta. When Kanakam visits Seeta's house, Seeta's mother misunderstands Seeta as a prostitute, then dies of a heart attack.

Bhujangam visits Seeta's house with Kanakam and his henchman Rangadu and after a heated quarrel, kidnaps Seeta while injuring Venu and rendering him unconscious. Bhujangam molests Seeta. Venu swears revenge against all three of them and is then taken care of by the family well-wisher Dada (Mukkamala) who raises him. Interestingly, every time Venu rages by thinking about them, he drools blood from his mouth. Years pass and Venu (Shobhan Babu) grows up and attends college, where he meets Radha Devi (Sarada). They start off on the wrong foot but Radha soon falls for Venu, but Venu does not reciprocate because he does not want to lose his aim. Venu graduates and becomes a doctor, helping the poor in town.

One night, Venu gets drenched in the rain and looks for shelter, so he stops in front of a large house which turns out to be Radha's. Radha invites him in, and he sees a photo of Bhujangam, realizing that Radha is Bhujangam's daughter. Venu returns home raging, but Dada pacifies him and makes him learn to forgive and forget. Meanwhile, Radha persists and continuously expresses her love towards Venu.

Meanwhile, Jagan (also Shobhan Babu) is a criminal with a sidekick Raju. He once visits a brothel run by Kanakam and sees Seeta who is a prostitute there. Seeing her plight and realizing how all the women are being trapped, Jagan decides to free her. He and Raju help her escape by fighting all the goons. They decide to take Seeta to the nearby doctor Venu's house and ask him to give her employment, and Venu takes her in as a nurse. Seeta learns from Dada that Venu is her brother, but she does not reveal it to him fearing that his reputation will be tarnished. Seeta reminds Venu of his sister, not realizing that it is her. Jagan gets into a fight with Rangadu and beats him up. Venu is called to treat him, but Venu refuses to administer treatment because Rangadu is one of the three people who kidnapped his sister. Dada then gives some wisdom, and Venu has a change of heart and treats Rangadu.

Bhujangam asks Jagan to kill a man named Narayana (P. J. Sarma) after Narayana threatens him. In return, Jagan asks for ownership of the brothel. He takes possession of it and frees all the trapped women. Bhujangam constantly warns Radha and tells her to quit visiting the Venu's house and hospital, which she disobeys. Bhujangam then hires a bar dancer Kusuma to trap Venu, but she eventually realizes his goodwill and has a change of heart. Bhujangam gives Radha a final warning to quit Venu, but she chooses Venu instead and leaves the house, moving in with Venu for good. Bhujangam decides to get Venu killed and asks Jagan to kill him.

One night, a scream is heard in Venu's house which alarms all the family members. They rush into his room where they see the bed covered in bloodstains and his body vanished. The police conduct an investigation and note that the murders of Narayana and Venu have been committed the same way. Bhujangam visits Radha at Venu's house and requests her to come back, but she denies. Suspecting Bhujangam is behind her brother's death, Seeta seeks revenge and tries to murder him at his home. However, he faints after seeing an apparition and believing it is Narayana's ghost. He is kidnapped and taken to a house where Jagan holds Radha hostage. Jagan exposes all of Bhujangam's atrocities to Radha who feels disgusted. Jagan also attempts to molest Radha but Seeta intervenes and chides him. Bhujangam confesses to all his sins, which is recorded on tape by Raju. The police arrive and try to arrest Jagan. Bhujangam also changes his word but Raju plays the tape and Bhujangam's crimes are revealed. It is revealed that Narayana is alive and Jagan did not kill him. As a flabbergast, it turns out Jagan is really Venu this entire time in disguise. The film ends on a happy note with the reunion of the family.

== Cast ==
- Sobhan Babu as Dr. Venu and Jagan
- Sarada as Radha Devi
- Kaikala Satyanarayana as Bhujangam
- Krishna Kumari as Seeta
- Mukkamala as Dada
- Raja Babu as Raju
- Arja Janardhana Rao as Rangadu
- P. J. Sarma as Narayana
- Krishnam Raju as Inspector

== Soundtrack ==
- "Ammalaanti Chalanadi Lokam Okate Undile"
- "Anuvu Anuvuna Velasina Deva Kanuvelugai Mamu Nadipimpa Rava" (Lyrics: C. Narayana Reddy; Singers: S. P. Balasubrahmanyam)
- "Kanche Kaada Manche Kaada" (Lyrics: C. Narayana Reddy; Singer: L. R. Eswari)
- "Koppu Choodu"
- "Pachani Mana Kapuram Pala Velugai" (Singer: P. Susheela)
- "Yevaaru Veeru"

== Box office ==
The film ran for more than 100 days in 6 centres in Andhra Pradesh.
