= Bobbili Brahmanna =

- DVD cover
- Directed by: K. Raghavendra Rao
- Written by: Screenplay: K. Raghavendra Rao; Story & Dialogues: Paruchuri Brothers
- Produced by: Uppalapati Surya Narayana Raju; Krishnam Raju (Presents)
- Starring: Krishnam Raju; Sharada; Jayasudha
- Cinematography: K. S. Prakash
- Edited by: D. Venkata Ratnam
- Music by: K. Chakravarthy
- Production company: Gopi Krishna Movies
- Release date: 19 July 1984
- Running time: 152 minutes
- Country: India
- Language: Telugu

Bobbili Brahmanna is a 1984 Telugu-language action drama film directed by K. Raghavendra Rao. It was produced by U. Suryanarayana Raju for the studio Gopi Krishna Movies. The film stars Krishnam Raju, Sharada, and Jayasudha as lead actors, and is scored by K. Chakravarthy. The film was blockbuster hit at the box office. The film won three Nandi Awards and one Filmfare Award South.

== Plot ==
Brahmanna is the head of Kotipalli, a village which does not have the police force. He is a descendant of the Bobbili clan, through which he has gained the role of a mediator between people in the village. He makes impartial judgements before the table of justice—a massive tree trunk adorned with a sacred sword.

Brahmanna's younger brother, Ravi, falls in love with a woman named Kasturi. One day, a man named Bullebbayi rapes Kasturi's older sister, Swaraiyam, in a graveyard. Ravi intercedes and saves Swaraiyim. He brings her to the table of justice. Brahmanna decides that Bellebbayi should marry Swaraiyam. Bellebbayi's father, Rayudu, is plotting to occupy the chair of the village head. Later, Rayudu performs a dangerous abortion on his now-pregnant daughter-in-law. Rayudu also starts a rumor that Brahmanna is having an affair with a woman named Susheela and that he sleeps in her hut on the outskirts of the village. Brahmanna reveals that Susheela is the widow of a man he wrongfully condemned to death, and he is now looking after her out of remorse.

Brahmanna's daughter, Rajeswari, falls in love with Susheela's son, Rambabu. Brahmanna agrees to the couple's marriage. Rajeswari goes to play with a swing in a fit of happiness. Rayudu causes Rajeswari to fall from the swing. She falls on a man, and Rayudu claims that the impact blinded that man. Brahmanna's tries to do justice even if the perpetrator is his family member, and he decides that Rajeswari now must marry the blind man to do penance. Ignoring this judgment, Ravi performs a secret marriage between Rajeswari and Rambabu. In anger, Brahmanna expels Ravi from the village. Susheela finds out Rayudu's plan to overthrow Brahmanna. She informs Brahmanna of this, and he slays Rayudu with the sword from the table of justice. Ending the village's autonomy, the film ends with the police arriving and arresting Brahmanna for Rayudu's murder.

== Cast ==
- Krishnam Raju as Brahmanna / Ravi (Dual role)
- Sharada as Savitri
- Jayasudha as Kasturi
- Rao Gopal Rao as Meesala Pedavenkatrayudu
- Satyanarayana as Bullebbayi
- Allu Ramalingaiah as Muthyalu
- Nutan Prasad as Markandeya Sastry
- Sarathi as Rathnalu
- Rajesh as Rambabu
- Annapoorna as Susheelamma
- Mucherla Aruna as Rajeswari
- Krishnaveni as Swarajyam
- P.J. Sarma as Punnaiah
- Chalapathi Rao as Investigating Inspector
- Sivaprasad as Tuka Rao

== Awards ==
Filmfare Awards

- Best Actor - Krishnam Raju

Nandi Awards - 1984

- Best Actor - Krishnam Raju
- Best Supporting Actress - Sharada
- Best Director - K. Raghavendra Rao

== Remake ==
Krishnam Raju remade the film in Hindi as Dharm Adhikari (1986) under Gopi Krishna Movies, starring Dilip Kumar, Jeetendra, and Sridevi. In Bobbili Brahmanna, Krishnam Raju played both the lead roles, but in Dharm Adhikari, the two roles were played by Dilip Kumar and Jeetendra. It was also remade in Kannada as Dharma Peeta, starring Shrinath and Shashikumar in lead roles.

== Legacy ==
The film's concept of a hero judging others' problems in his village became very popular. Later, the formula was used in Cheran Pandiyan (1991) (Tamil film, remade in Telugu as Balarama Krishnulu in 1992), Chinna Gounder (1992) (Tamil film, remade in Telugu as Chinarayudu in 1992), Bobbili Simham (1994), Nattamai (1994) (Tamil film, remade in Telugu as Pedarayudu in 1995), Kondapalli Rattaiah (1995) and Kondaveeti Simhasanam (2002).
