= Murder of Billipuram Nagaraju =

- Date: May 4, 2022
- Location: Saroornagar, Hyderabad, India
- Type: Murder, Honour killing
- Cause: Interfaith marriage
- Convicted: Syed Mobin Ahmed and Mohammed Masood Ahmed
- Convictions: Murder
- Sentence: Life imprisonment

The murder of Billipuram Nagaraju took place in the South Indian state of Telangana. Nagaraju, a Hindu, was murdered in an honour killing because he had married Syed Ashrin Sultanam, a Muslim, while Nagaraju was a Dalit. The killing was done by Syed Ashrin Sultana's brother Syed Mobin Ahmed with the help of their relatives as they opposed the inter-faith wedding.

== Background ==
Syed Ashrin Sultana, the youngest of five siblings and a Commerce (BCom) graduate, lived in Vikarabad, Hyderabad. Billipuram Nagaraju completed a course from the city's Industrial Training Institute and was a native of Marpalle in Rangareddy district. They knew each other since school and got married at the Arya Samaj temple on 31 January 2022 despite opposition from her family. Fearing threats from her family, they moved to Visakhapatnam but later returned to Hyderabad. Nagaraju worked as a Car salesman.

== Murder ==
Billipuram Nagaraju was stabbed with a knife and beaten with an iron rod in the busy Saroornagar area of Hyderabad by Sultana's brother Syed Mobin Ahmed and others on May 4, 2022. Sultana begged for help from passersby but did not get help to save her husband.

== Court proceedings ==
Sultana's brother Syed Mobin Ahmed, and his brother-in-law, Mohammed Masood Ahmed were convicted for the murder and sentenced to life imprisonment.
