= Kannappa =

Telugu saint devoted to Shiva

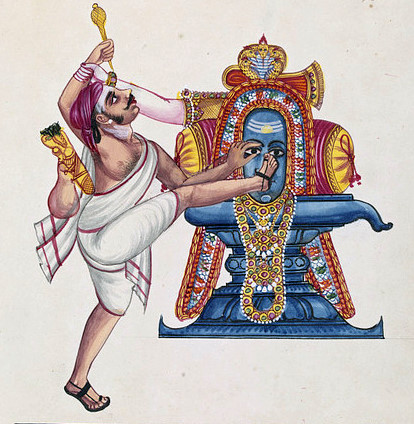
Painting, c. 1820 – c. 1825, portrays Shiva intervening to prevent Kannappa from sacrificing his eye.

Kannappa (Devanagari : कन्नप्पा) was a devotee of the Hindu god Shiva and is significant in South Indian traditions. His story is closely connected with the Srikalahasteeswara Temple in Andhra Pradesh. He is one of the 63 Nayanars in the Tamil Saiva Siddhanta tradition.

Originally a hunter, Kannappar offered his devotion to a shiva lingam by making simple offerings and eventually sacrificing one of his eyes. As he prepared to offer the second, Shiva appeared from the linga, granting him liberation.

== Narrative ==
Kannappa was born in present-day Andhra Pradesh as Thinnan (transl. strong, powerful). His father was the village chief, and he came from a hunter family.

Kannappa's devotion to Shiva began when he discovered the vayu linga (embodiment of air) while hunting in the forest. He offered the aniconic representation of Shiva whatever he could, including water from his mouth and meat from his hunts. These acts, while unconventional, were accepted by Shiva due to the hunter's sincerity and pure heart. Kannappa once noticed that the lingam was bleeding from one of its eyes. Without hesitation, Kannappa plucked out one of his own eyes and placed it on the lingam to stop the bleeding. When the other eye of the lingam began to bleed, Kannappa prepared to offer his remaining eye. To ensure he could correctly place his eye, he marked the spot with his foot. Moved by this act of devotion, Shiva appeared and stopped him, restoring both his eyes and granting him liberation. The vayu linga is worshipped at the Srikalahasteeswara temple in Andhra Pradesh.

== Commemoration ==
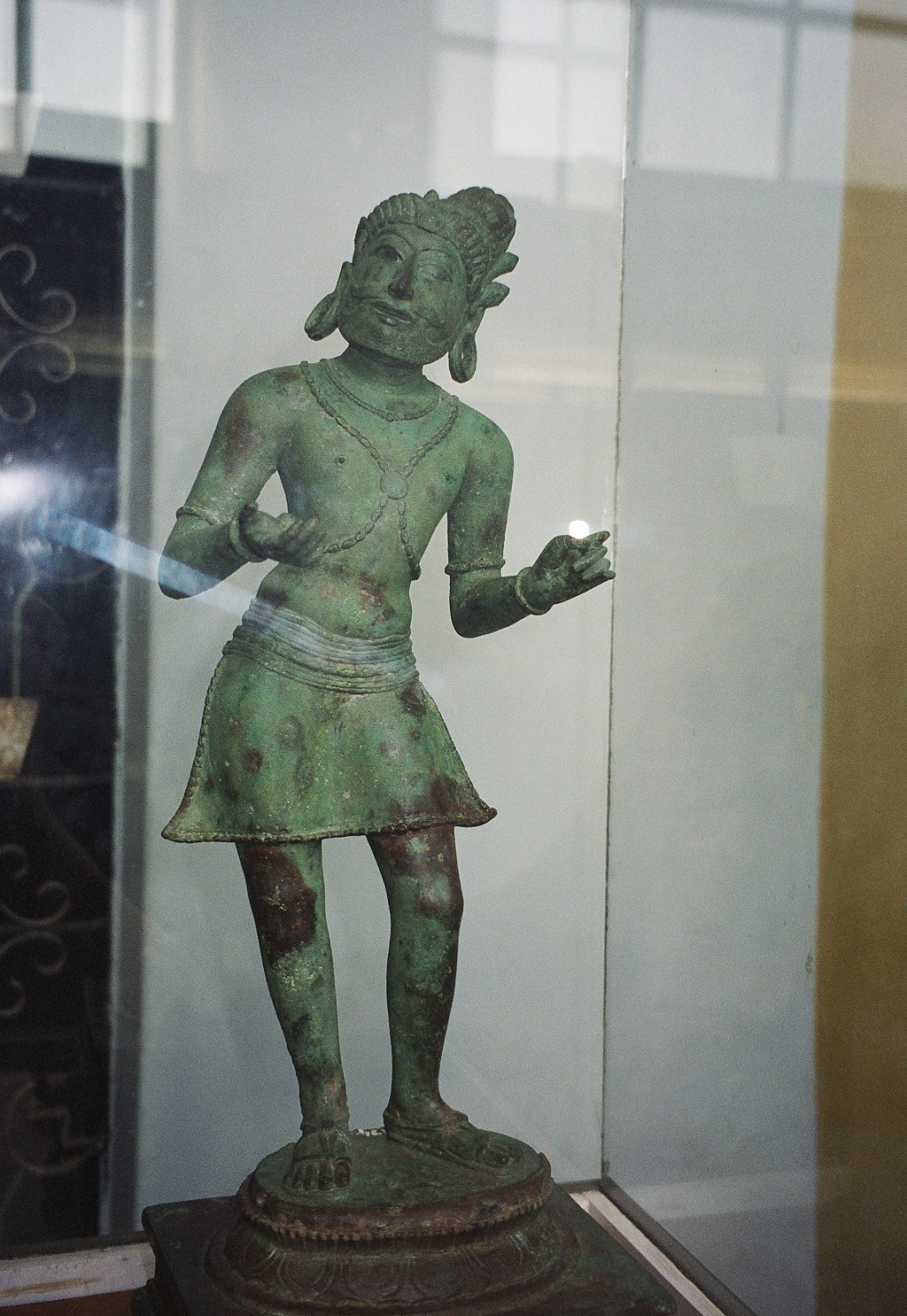
Statue of Kannappa at Tanjore Museum, Thanjavur

The story of Kannappa's devotion is recounted in several literary works, including the Kalahastisvara Satakamu by Dhurjati (16th century) and the Basava Puranam (13th century) in Telugu, and the Ragalegalu by Harihara (12th century) in Kannada.

In Tamil Shaivism, Kannappa is venerated for his devotion, and his story is documented in the Periya Puranam, a 12th-century Tamil hagiography of the 63 Nayanars, Kannappa is portrayed, along with other devotees, in the thousand-pillar corridor of the Meenakshi temple in Madurai.

The scene of Kannappa's sacrifice is portrayed in Shaiva temple pillar reliefs of early Vijayanagara.

== Depictions in film ==
Year	Title	Language	Character played by	Notes
1938	Kannappa Nayanar	Tamil	V. N. Sundaram	
1954	Bedara Kannappa	Kannada	Dr. Rajkumar	
1954	Kalahasti Mahatyam	Telugu	Dr. Rajkumar	
1955	Shiv Bhakta	Hindi	Shahu Modak	
1976	Bhakta Kannappa	Telugu	Krishnam Raju	
1988	Shiva Mecchida Kannappa	Kannada	Shiva Rajkumar, Puneeth Rajkumar (younger version)	
2025	Kannappa	Telugu	Vishnu Manchu	
