= Sarathi (actor) =

Indian comedic actor, producer (1942–2022)

Sarathi, also called Kadali Jaya Sarathi, (26 June 1942 – 1 August 2022) was an Indian comedic actor and producer in the Telugu film industry. His most notable roles are in Manavuri Pandavulu, Bobilli Brahmanna, Driver Ramudu, Bakta Kannappa and Jaganmohini. Sarathi died from kidney ailments at a hospital in Hyderabad on 1 August 2022, at the age of 80.

== Filmography ==
Year	Title	Role	Note
1961	Seetharama Kalyanam	Nalakoobara	
1961	Velugu Needalu		
1966	Paramanandayya Sishyula Katha		
1968	Brahmachari		
1968	Sukha Dukhalu		
1969	Bhale Rangadu		
1969	Gandikota Rahasyam		
1969	Aggi Veerudu	Fisherman	
1971	Mattilo Manikyam	Manikyam's friend	
1972	Collector Janaki		
1973	Bangaru Babu		
1973	Mayadari Malligadu	Balabrahmananda Swamy's (Padmanabham) disciple	
1974	Tatamma Kala		
1974	Manchi Manushulu		
1976	Bhakta Kannappa		
1977	Edureeta		
1977	Maa Iddari Katha		
1977	Chiranjeevi Rambabu	Singaram	
1977	Raja Ramesh		
1977	Chanakya Chandragupta		
1977	Amara Deepam		
1977	Aalu Magalu		
1978	Indradhanussu	Shanti's suitor	
1978	Jaganmohini		
1978	Mana Voori Pandavulu		
1978	Kalanthakulu		
1979	Sommokadidhi Sokokadidhi		
1979	Driver Ramudu		
1979	Kothala Raayudu	Sarathi	
1979	Oka Challani Rathri	Thyagaraju	
1979	Cheyyethi Jai Kottu		
1979	Gandharva Kanya	Vasantha	
1980	Mahalakshmi	Sarathi	
1980	Mosagadu	Babji	
1980	Ammayi Mogudu Mamaku Yamudu		
1980	Gopala Rao Gari Ammayi		
1980	Venkateswara Vratha Mahatyam	Pothuraju	
1980	Gharana Donga	Krishna's assistant	
1980	Bebbuli	Jagannatham's secretary	
1980	Kottapeta Rowdy		
1980	Prema Tarangalu		
1980	Mama Allulla Saval		
1981	Babulugaadi Debba		
1981	Taxi Driver		
1981	Guvvala Janta		
1981	Gola Nagamma		
1982	Kaliyuga Ramudu		
1982	Madhura Swapnam		
1982	Devatha		
1982	Pagabattina Simham		
1982	Jaggu		
1982	Bangaru Bhoomi	Chokkarao	
1982	Pralaya Rudrudu	Sambayya	
1983	Dharma Poratam	Dr. S. Apparao	
1983	Mayagadu	Gopi	
1983	Gudachari No.1	Pakshula Papanna	
1983	Bobbili Puli		
1983	Shakthi		
1984	Bobbili Brahmanna	Rathnalu	
1984	Merupu Daadi	Anji	
1984	Intiguttu		
1984	Babulugaadi Debba		
1984	Sangeeta Samrat		
1985	Illale Devatha		
1985	Aggiraju		
1985	Edadugula Bandham		
1985	Ragile Gundelu		
1985	Chattamtho Poratam	Bujji Babu	
1985	Maya Mohini		
1986	Jayam Manade		
1986	Manavudu Danavudu		
1986	Aada Dampatulu		
1986	Tandra Paparayudu		
1987	Ajeyudu		
1987	Sthree Sahasam	Pasupathi aka Pasu	
1987	Veera Pratap		
1988	Prana Snehitulu		
1989	Simha Swapnam		
1989	Koduku Diddina Kapuram		
1990	Alludugaru		
1990	Prajala Manishi	Constable	
1990	Abhisarika		
1990	Intinta Deepavali		
1990	Anna Thammudu		
1991	Tharaka Prabhuni Deeksha Mahimalu		
1992	Yamudannaki Mogudu		
1992	Srimaan Brahmachari		
1993	Chinna Alludu	Land Surveyor	
1993	Matru Devo Bhava		
1993	Jeevithame Oka Cinema		
1993	Paruvu Prathishta		
1994	Neram		
1994	Hello Alludu	Doctor	
1995	Pokiri Raja	Principal	
1996	Dharma Chakram		
1997	Priyamaina Srivaru		
