= Prema Tarangalu =

- Poster
- Directed by: S. P. Chitti Babu
- Starring: Krishnam Raju; Savitri; Jayasudha; Chiranjeevi; Sujatha; Kaikala Satyanarayana
- Music by: Satyam
- Release date: 24 October 1980
- Country: India
- Language: Telugu

Prema Tarangalu (transl. Waves of love) is a 1980 Indian Telugu-language film directed by S. P. Chitti Babu. The film stars Krishnam Raju, Jayasudha, and Chiranjeevi. It is a remake of the Hindi film Muqaddar Ka Sikandar (1978).

== Plot ==
Orphaned and abused at a very young age, a young boy, Vijay struggles to make a living by slaving day and night, working in the house of a wealthy man named Ranga Rao (Kanta Rao). Rao does not like Vijay. It is later revealed that another orphan had taken advantage of his kindness in the past, hence his animosity. Rao's young daughter Sujata, however, empathizes with the boy and they form a friendship. Eventually, he is adopted by a woman (Savitri) who also works for Ranga Rao. On Sujata's birthday, Vijay who promised to replace one of her dolls which he had broken, steals an expensive doll from a shop to give as a gift. However, Rao refuses to let the boy attend the party and when Vijay breaks into Sujata's room to deliver the doll he is caught and accused of trying to rob the house. He and his mother are banished from the Rao household. Shortly thereafter, Vijay's mother dies, leaving him with the responsibility of looking after her daughter.

As Vijay is crying in the graveyard, a fakir comes to him and asks him to embrace the woes of life and find happiness in sadness, for then he would become the conqueror of fate. A grown up Vijay (Krishnam Raju) has amassed a fortune by turning in smuggled goods to the police and receiving the reward payouts. With all his wealth, he has built an impressive house for himself and set up a profitable business.

Vijay still has not forgotten Sujata (Sujatha) from his childhood. She and her father have fallen on hard times, and Vijay is anonymously supporting them. Eventually, he gets up the nerve to try to talk to Sujata, but she still believes that he betrayed her family, and she snubs him. Vijay is upset by the refusal and becomes a heavy drinker. He also visits Jaya Sudha's brothel on a regular basis. One night, in the bar Vijay meets up with Kumar (Chiranjeevi) and a friendship, is formed between them when Kumar risks his own life to save Vijay from a bomb blast. Vijay introduces Kumar to Ranga Rao and the two begin to work together.

Jaya eventually falls in an unrequited love with Vijay, and this in turn angers Gangulu (Kaikala Satyanarayana), a hardcore criminal who loves Jaya and will kill anyone who lays an eye on her. Upon finding that Vijay is frequently visiting Jaya, Gangulu confronts Vijay and in the ensuing fight is thrashed by him. He swears to kill Vijay.

Sujata discovers Vijay's kindness to her family and goes to thank him. Encouraged, Vijay tries to profess his love to Sujatha through a love letter. Because Vijay himself is illiterate, Kumar transcribes the letter for him, but the plan backfires when Sujata mistakes the letter as actually being from Kumar. Kumar, unaware that Sujata is the girl Vijay loves, reciprocates her love, and the two begin to date. Vijay, upon learning this, struggles with his emotions but decides he must sacrifice his love for the sake of his friendship with Kumar. Kumar and Sujata plan to marry.

Vijay's visits to Jaya have hampered his reputation, and the upcoming marriage of his sister is at risk of being canceled over his behavior. Kumar, knowing Vijay don't change, visits Jaya and offers to pay her if she abandons Vijay. Jaya, upon learning the reason, promises Kumar that she would sooner die than let Vijay visit her again. Later, Vijay arrives at Jaya's brothel and she refuses to let him in. Vijay demands entry and when Jaya is unable to stop him she kills herself by swallowing a diamond and dies in his arms.

Gangulu, in the meanwhile, has formed an alliance with Vijay's arch enemy and upon learning of Jaya's death hatches a plan to destroy Vijay and his family. Sujata and Vijay's sister are preparing for their weddings; the goons kidnap Vijay's sister but Kumar follows them and rescues her. Gangulu kidnaps Sujata, but Vijay follows him. He rescues Sujata and sends her home while he fights Gangulu. In the final battle, both Gangulu and Vijay are mortally wounded and Vijay tells Gangulu that he never loved Jaya. Gangulu feels regret and dies. A dying Vijay reaches the wedding of Sujata and Kumar. Just as the wedding ceremony is completed, Vijay collapses. His dying words inadvertently reveal his love for Sujata and he dies.

== Cast ==
- Krishnam Raju as Vijay
- Chiranjeevi as Kumar
- Savitri
- Jayasudha as dancer
- Sujatha as Sujata
- Kaikala Satyanarayana as Gangulu
- Kanta Rao as Ranga Rao
- K.V. Chalam as Vijay's friend
- J. V. Ramana Murthy
- Valluri Balakrishna
- Mukkamala
- Sarathi
- Bheemaraju
- P. J. Sharma
- Anand Mohan
- Chalapathi Rao
- Narra Venkateswara Rao
- Jhansi
- Sri Lakshmi
- Baby Thulasi

== Soundtrack ==
- "Kalayaina Nijamaina Kadanna Ledanna" (Lyricist: C. Narayana Reddy; Singers: S. P. Balasubrahmanyam and P. Susheela)
- "Manasu Oka Mandaram Chelimi Tana Makarandam" (Lyricist: Atreya; Singer: S. P. Balasubrahmanyam)
- "Manasu Oka Mandaram" (Lyricist: Atreya; Singer: S. P. Sailaja)
- "Naa Hridayam Tella Kagitam" (Lyricist: Atreya; Singers: S. P. Balasubrahmanyam, P. Susheela)
- "Navvenduke Ee Jeevitam Navvokkatera Shashwatam" (Lyricist: Atreya; Singer: S. P. Balasubrahmanyam)
- "Prema Tarangalu Navajeevana Ragalu" (Lyricist: C. Narayana Reddy; Singer: S. P. Balasubramanyam)
