= Amara Deepam (1977 film) =

- Theatrical release poster
- Directed by: K. Raghavendra Rao
- Written by: Jandhyala
- Produced by: Uppalapati Surya Narayana Raju
- Starring: Krishnam Raju; Murali Mohan; Jayasudha
- Music by: Satyam
- Release date: 29 September 1977
- Country: India
- Language: Telugu

Amara Deepam (transl. The Eternal Lamp) is a 1977 Indian Telugu-language drama film directed by K. Raghavendra Rao. The film stars Krishnam Raju, Murali Mohan and Jayasudha. It is a remake of the Malayalam film Theekkanal (1976) which was earlier remade in Tamil as Dheepam (1977). The film was released on 29 September 1977. Krishnam Raju received the Filmfare Award for Best Actor – Telugu and Nandi Award for Best Actor.

== Plot ==
Hari and Shiva Prasad are siblings. One day Shiva accidentally breaks their family photo. Hari beats Shiva and runs away from home. Hari is brought up by a notorious smuggler (Kaikala Satyanarayana). The smuggler changes Hari's name to Shri Krishna, which was his deceased son's name. Krishna (Krishnam Raju) grows up to be an immoral man who uses women for his own pleasure. He falls in love with Parvati (Jayasudha), who is his adoptive sister Madhavi's (Madhavi) friend. When Krishna proposes to Parvati, she refuses because Parvati and Shiva Prasad (Murali Mohan) love each other. A jealous Krishna attempts to kill Shiva Prasad. He accidentally sees their childhood photo and realises that Shiva is his own younger brother. He arranges Shiva Prasad and Parvati's marriage. Shiva Prasad becomes aware of Krishna's love for Parvati. He misunderstands the situation and doubts Parvati's devotion towards him. Krishna learns of this and decides to kill himself for his brother's happiness.

== Cast ==
Actor / Actress	Character
Krishnam Raju	Hari / Shri Krishna
Jayasudha	Parvati
Muralimohan	Shiva Prasad
Madhavi	Madhavi "Madhu"
Kaikala Satyanarayana	Madhavi's father
Prabhakar Reddy	Ranganatham
Jayamalini	Asha
Sarathi	Rahim
Sakshi Ranga Rao	Manager
Mada Venkateswara Rao	Appa Rao
Ramaprabha	Ratnam
Dubbing Janaki	Paidi Nookalu
Narra Venkateswara Rao	
Potti Prasad	

== Soundtrack ==
The music was composed by Satyam.

Track listing
No.	Title	Lyrics	Singer(s)	Length
1.	"Antalesi Andaalu"	Aarudhra	V. Ramakrishna, Ramola
2.	"Inte Ee Jeevitamu Chivariki Anta Shoonyamu"	Aatreya	V. Ramakrishna
3.	"Kottaga Unda Badhaga Unda"	Aatreya	P. Susheela
4.	"Naa Jeevana Sandhya Samayamlo"	Veturi	V. Ramakrishna, P. Susheela
5.	"Neeve Sarathi"	Veturi	P. Susheela
6.	"E Ragamo Idi E Talamo"	Aatreya	P. Susheela, S. P. Balasubrahmanyam

== Accolades ==
Krishnam Raju won the Filmfare Award for Best Actor – Telugu, and the Nandi Award for Best Actor.
