= Krishnam Raju =

Indian actor and politician (1940–2022)

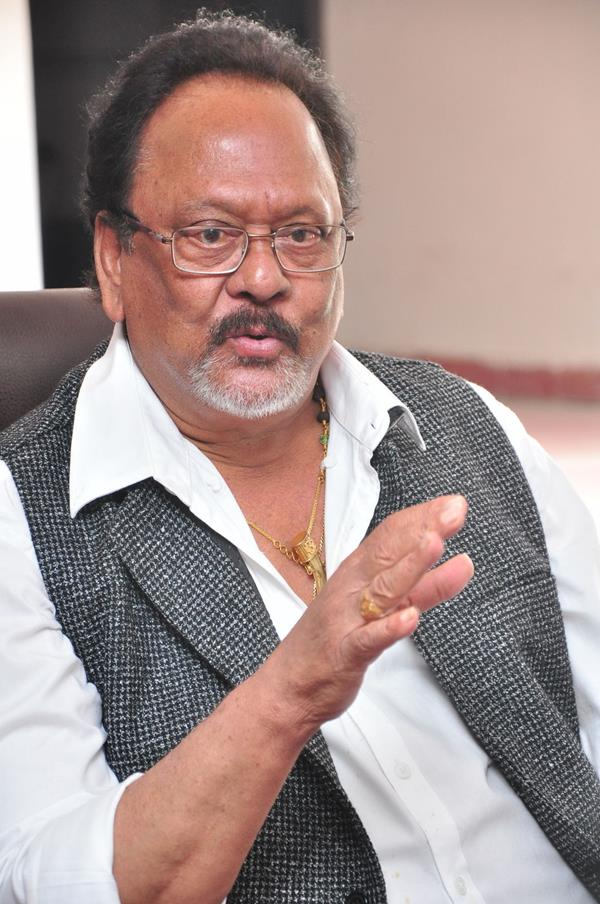
- Raju in 2016

Minister of State Government of India
- In office 30 September 2000 – 22 May 2004
- Ministry: Term
- Minister of Rural Development: 29 January 2003 – 22 May 2004
- Minister of Consumer Affairs, Food & Public Distribution: 1 July 2002 – 29 January 2003
- Minister of Defence: 22 July 2001 – 1 July 2002
- Minister of External Affairs: 30 September 2000 – 22 July 2001

Member of Parliament Lok Sabha
- In office 6 October 1999 – 16 May 2004
- Preceded by: Kanumuru Bapi Raju
- Succeeded by: Chegondi Venkata Harirama Jogaiah
- Constituency: Narasapuram
- In office 10 March 1998 – 26 April 1999
- Preceded by: Gopal Krishna Thota
- Succeeded by: Mudragada Padmanabham
- Constituency: Kakinada

Personal details
- Born: Uppalapati Venkata Krishnam Raju; 20 January 1940 Mogalthur, Madras Presidency, British India (now in Andhra Pradesh, India)
- Died: 11 September 2022 (aged 82) Hyderabad, Telangana, India
- Party: Bharatiya Janata Party
- Other political affiliations: Praja Rajyam Party, Indian National Congress
- Spouses: Sitadevi (died) Shyamaladevi (m. 1996)
- Children: 3
- Relatives: U. Suryanarayana Raju (brother); Prabhas (nephew)
- Occupation: Actor, politician

Uppalapati Venkata Krishnam Raju (20 January 1940 – 11 September 2022) was an Indian actor and politician. He was known for his work in Telugu cinema and was widely known as "Rebel Star" for his rebellious acting style. He was the recipient of the inaugural Nandi Award for Best Actor. Krishnam Raju starred in more than 183 feature films in his career. He made his film debut with the 1966 film Chilaka Gorinka, produced and directed by K. Pratyagatma. Krishnam Raju had won five Filmfare Awards South and four state Nandi Awards. Krishnam Raju was also an active politician.

Krishnam Raju acted in several successful films such as Jeevana Tarangalu (1973), Krishnaveni (1974), Bhakta Kannappa (1976), Amara Deepam (1977), Sati Savitri (1978), Katakatala Rudrayya (1978), Mana Voori Pandavulu (1978), Rangoon Rowdy (1979), Sri Vinayaka Vijayamu (1979), Sita Ramulu (1980), Taxi Driver (1981), Trisulam (1982), Dharmaatmudu (1983), Bobbili Brahmanna (1984), Tandra Paprayudu (1986), Marana Sasanam (1987), Viswanatha Nayakudu (1987), Antima Theerpu (1988), Bava Bavamaridi (1993), Palnati Pourusham (1994).

In the late 1990s, he became active in politics. He joined Bharatiya Janata Party and was elected to the 12th and 13th Lok Sabha from Kakinada and Narasapuram constituencies. He served as a Minister of State for the Ministry of External Affairs in the third Vajpayee Ministry from 1999 to 2004. In March 2009, he joined Praja Rajyam Party, founded by Chiranjeevi. In the 2009 general elections, he contested the MP seat from the Rajahmundry constituency and lost.

== Personal life ==
Uppalapati Venkata Krishnam Raju was born in Mogalthur, West Godavari district, on 20 January 1940, to Uppalapati Veera Venkata Satyanarayana Raju. He completed his early education at Government Boys School in Mogalthur and later at Taylor's High School, in Narasapuram, Andhra Pradesh. He graduated with a B.Com, from Badruka College, in Hyderabad, Telangana. Krishnam Raju was first married to Sitadevi, who died. He married Shyamaladevi, in 1996, with whom he had three daughters.

Film producer, Uppalapati Surya Narayana Raju, was his younger brother and actor Prabhas' father. Prabhas is his nephew. Another nephew of his, Siddharth Rajkumar, made his acting debut with Keratam (2011). Krishnam Raju worked as a journalist for the Andhra Ratna. He was awarded the second best photographer at the state level. He was fond of cameras and had a collection of cameras. He was the founder of Gopi Krishna Movies. At a later age, he suffered from multiple illnesses like Heart rhythm disorder, heart dysfunction, diabetes mellitus, coronary heart disease, chronic lung disease, and chronic bronchitis.

== Career ==
=== Debut and career up to 1967 ===
Krishnam Raju entered Tollywood in 1966 with the film Chilaka Gorinka directed by Kotayya Pratyagatma alongside Krishna Kumari. The film won Nandi Award for Best Feature Film - Silver for that year, however, the film did not produce the expected results for Raju. Later he acted in the mythological film Sri Krishnavataram (1967) which also stars N. T. Rama Rao. In 1968, he appeared in Nenante Nene. He was at first reluctant to act in the film given the role is of an antagonist and that he debuted in films in a protagonist role. Upon being advised by his peers and co-actors to gain exposure to a diversified character, he took on the role. The film turned out successful. He subsequently received several offers for antagonist roles following the critical praise he garnered in the role. He took upon a few films and later returned to protagonist roles. He acted in many films with the established actors N. T. Rama Rao and Akkineni Nageswara Rao. He also acted in many films with the established actresses Krishna Kumari, Rajasulochana, Jamuna, and Kanchana.

=== Breakthrough: 1968–1973 ===
Krishnam Raju acted alongside Kanchana in Nenante Nene (1968) and set the trend of handsome villains. Later, he acted in Bhale Abbayilu (1969), the Telugu remake of Yash Chopra's 1965 film Waqt. Later he acted in films such as Buddhimantudu (1969), Manushulu Marali (1969), Malli Pelli (1970), and Jai Jawan (1970). He acted opposite Bollywood actress Rekha in Amma Kosam (1970) which was her first film as an actress. Later he acted in films such as Anuradha, Bhagyavantudu (1971), and Bangaaru Talli (1971), the remake of the critically acclaimed 1957 Hindi film Mother India. Later he acted in films such as Muhammad- bin-Tughluq (1972) portraying the role of Islamic scholar Ibn Battuta, Raj Mahal (1972), Hantakulu Devaantakulu (1972) opposite Rajasulochana, Manavudu Danavudu (1972) opposite Krishna Kumari, Neeti-Nijayiti (1972) opposite Kanchana and Vintha Dampatulu (1972) opposite Jamuna. Later he acted in films such as Badi Panthulu (1972), Bala Mitrula Katha (1972), Jeevana Tarangalu (1973), and Kanna Koduku (1973). In most of the films, he acted as an antihero, villain, and supporting roles and in leadership roles in a few films.

=== 1974–1983 ===
Krishnam Raju acted in Bantrothu Bharya which marks the first collaboration of Krishnam Raju with Dasari Narayana Rao. Later he acted in the critically acclaimed film Krishnaveni opposite Vanisri directed by V. Madhusudhana Rao. The film marks the debut of Krishnam Raju as a producer, the film was produced under his own production house Gopi Krishna Movies. Later he acted in Parivartana opposite Jamuna, Kanchana and Lakshmi, and Bharati opposite Jamuna, Iddaru Iddare, and Yavvanam Katesindi. Later he acted in Bhakta Kannappa portraying the roles of Arjuna and Kannappa Nayanar directed by Bapu which is the unique Telugu film to win the National Film Award for Best Audiography. Later he acted in the crime drama Manchiki Maro Peru. Later he acted in Kurukshetram portraying the role of Karna directed by Kamalakara Kameswara Rao. Later he acted in Amara Deepam which marks the first collaboration of Krishnam Raju with K. Raghavendra Rao. The film earned him Filmfare Best Actor Award (Telugu) and Nandi Award for Best Actor for the year 1977. Later he acted in films such as Jeevana Teeralu, Manushulu Chesina Dongalu, and Sati Savitri. Later he acted in the lavishly made Katakatala Rudrayya which grossed ₹75 lakh (US$78,000) made on a budget of ₹18 lakh (US$19,000). Later he acted in Mana Voori Pandavulu which was produced by him and Jaya Krishna. The film garnered Filmfare Best Film Award (Telugu) for the year 1978 and Krishnam Raju shared the award with Jaya Krishna. Katakataala Rudraiah and Mana Voori Pandavulu was released within a gap of 10 days and both films became blockbusters. Later he acted in films such as Ramabanam, Andadu Aagadu in which he acts in a role of a spy which is parallel to James Bond, which became a smash hit. Later he acted in Rangoon Rowdy, Sri Vinayaka Vijayamu portraying the role of Lord Shiva. Later he acted in films such as Shivamettina Satyam, Kalyana Chakravarti, and Alludu Pattina Bharatam which were directed by K. Viswanath. Later he acted in Sita Ramulu, Bebbuli, and Prema Tarangalu, the Telugu remake of the 1978 Bollywood blockbuster Muqaddar Ka Sikandar. In 1981, he acted in Aadavaallu Meeku Joharlu directed by K. Balachander. In the same year, he acted in Agni Poolu which was based on Yaddanapudi Sulochana Rani's novel of the same name. Later he acted in the musical hit, Puli Bidda, Taxi Driver, Ragile Jwala, Guvvala Janta, Rama Lakshmanulu, Madhura Swapnam, Talli Kodukula Anubandham, Nipputo Chelagaatam, Golconda Abbulu, Jaggu, Pralaya Rudrudu, and critically acclaimed Trisulam. Later he acted in Nijam Chebite Nerama!, Adavi Simhalu, Puli Bebbuli, Kotikokkadu and Dharmaatmudu.

=== 1984–1990 ===
In 1984, Krishnam Raju acted in Yuddham, Sardar, Babulugaadi Debba, Kondaveeti Nagulu and S. P. Bhayankar. Later, he acted in the Tollywood industrial hit Bobbili Brahmanna which earned him Filmfare Best Actor Award (Telugu) and Nandi Award for Best Actor. He also remade the film in Hindi as Dharm Adhikari with Dilip Kumar and Jeetendra in 1986. Later, he acted in films such as Raraju, Bharatamlo Shankaravam, Rowdy, Bandee, Tirugubatu, Aggi Raju, Bullet, Ukku Manishi, Ravana Brahma, Neti Yugadharmam, and Ugra Narasimham. In 1986, he acted in Tandra Paparayudu portraying the role of Tandra Paparayudu which earned him the Filmfare Best Actor Award for the year 1986. The film premiered at the 11th International Film Festival of India. Later, he acted in films such as Sardar Dharmanna and Marana Shasanam which earned him the Filmfare Best Actor Award for the year 1987. In 1987, he acted in Brahma Nayudu, Viswanatha Nayakudu portraying the role of Srikrishnadevaraya. Later, he acted in films such as Maarana Homam, Kirai Dada, Maa Inti Maha Raju, Antima Teerpu, Prithvi Raj, Prachanda Bharatam, Dharma Teja, Prana Snehitulu, Simha Swapnam, Shri Ramachandrudu, Bhagawan, Two Town Rowdy, Yama Dharma Raju and Neti Siddhartha.

=== 1991–2022 ===
In 1991, Krishnam Raju acted in Vidhata, Bava Bavamaridi, Jailor Gaari Abbayi, Andaroo Andare, and Gangmaster. In 1994, he acted in Palnati Pourusham & this film was a super hit at the box office. Later, he acted in Rikshaw Rudraiah, Simha Garjana, Nayudugaari Kutumbam, Tata Manavadu, Kutumba Gowravam, and Maa Nannaku Pelli which won Nandi Award for Akkineni Award for Best Home-viewing Feature Film. In 1997, he entered Sandalwood and acted in two Kannada films viz Hai Bangalore and Simhada Mari. Later he acted in Sultan, Vamsoddharakudu, and Neeku Nenu Naaku Nuvvu which won Nandi Award for Akkineni Award for Best Home-viewing Feature Film. Later he acted in Raam and Billa, a film of the Don film series, and acted with Prabhas for the first time. Later he acted in Thakita Thakita and Rebel. Billa marks the second innings of his production house, Gopi Krishna Movies. Krishnam Raju said in an interview that he would produce films continuously under the banner. Later he acted in Chandee, Yevade Subramanyam, and the first Indian 3D historical film, Rudhramadevi where he portrays the role of Ganapati Devudu, father of Rudrama Devi. Raju's last film was Radhe Shyam (2022), in which he played the role of Paramahamsa.

== Political career ==
He contested an unsuccessful election in 1992 from Narasapuram on a Congress ticket. After a brief hibernation, he rejoined politics, accepting an invitation from the Bharatiya Janata Party. He won the 1998 Lok Sabha elections from Kakinada. He set a record with a thumping majority of over 165,000 votes, the maximum majority compared to any of the other constituencies in Andhra Pradesh which ensured him a berth at the centre. He was on the advisory committees of the Information and Broadcasting and Commerce and Industry Ministries during 1998–99.

- 1998 Elected to 12th Lok Sabha
- 1998–99 Member, Committee on Commerce Member, Consultative Committee, Ministry of Information and Broadcasting
- 1999 Re-elected to 13th Lok Sabha (2nd term) Whip, B.J.P. Parliamentary Party, Lok Sabha
- 1999–2000 Member, Committee on Finance Member, Committee on members of parliament Local Area Development Scheme
- 2000 Member, Consultative Committee, Ministry of Commerce and Industry
- 30 September 2000- Union Minister of State, Ministry of External Affairs 22 July 2001
- 22 July 2001- Union Minister of State, Ministry of Defence 30 June 2002
- 1 July 2002 - Union Minister of State, Ministry of Consumer Affairs, Food onwards and Public Distribution

=== Role in the prohibition of cow slaughter ===
The Ban on Cow Slaughter Bill, 1999 was introduced in the Lok Sabha by Yogi Adityanath which provided for a complete prohibition on the slaughter of cows for all purposes. The statement of objects and reasons appended to the Bill stated, "Article 48 of the Constitution enjoins on the State to organise agriculture and animal husbandry on modern and scientific lines and in particular to take steps for preserving and improving the breeds and prohibiting the slaughter of cow and its progeny. Given the consideration that the cow and its entire progeny must be saved to provide milk, as well as manure, it becomes imperative to impose a complete ban on cow slaughter."

In 2000, Krishnam Raju moved a motion in the Lok Sabha for the introduction of The Prohibition of Cow Slaughter Bill, 2000 with the following statement of objects and reasons, "Article 48 of the Constitution enjoins upon the State to organise agriculture and animal husbandry on modern and scientific lines and in particular to take steps for preserving and improving the breeds and prohibiting the slaughter of cow and its progeny. G. M. Banatwala, raised the issue regarding the legislative competence of Parliament to enact legislation on the subject. Banatwala referred to the opinion given by the then Attorney General, M.C. Setalvad in the Lok Sabha on 1 April 1984 on the issue, to the effect that it was outside the legislative competence of that House to come forward with any Bill concerning the organisation of Agriculture and Animal Husbandry. However, the Chairman of the Lok Sabha in his ruling on the point raised by Banatwala inter alia observed that the Chair does not decide whether the Bill is constitutionally within the legislative competence of the House or not. Further, the House also does not take a decision on the specific question of vires of the Bill. The motion moved by was, therefore, put to the vote of the House and adopted. Accordingly, the Chair permitted the introduction of the Bill by Krishnam Raju."

== Death ==
Raju died on 11 September 2022, at the age of 82, from bacterial and fungal pneumonia followed by cardiac arrest, at the Asian Institute of Gastroenterology Hospitals in Hyderabad, India, which he entered for post-COVID-19 issues on 5 August 2022.

== Awards ==
Filmfare Awards South

- Best Actor - Telugu - Amaradeepam (1977)
- Best Picture - Manavuri Pandavulu (1978) (award share with Jayakrishna)
- Best Actor - Telugu - Bobbili Brahmanna (1984)
- Best Actor - Telugu - Tandra Paparayudu (1986)
- Filmfare Lifetime Achievement Award (2006)

Nandi Awards
Best Actor

Year	Film	Role
1977	Amara Deepam	Shri Krishna / Hari
1984	Bobbili Brahmanna	Brahmanna / Ravi

Best Character Actor

Year	Film	Role
1994	Jailor Gaari Abbayi	Jailor Chakrapani

- 2014 - Raghupathi Venkaiah Award

=== TSR TV9 National Awards ===
- 2012 - Lifetime Achievement Award
- 2015 - Legend Actor of Silver Screen
- 2016 - 5 Decades Star Award

=== Zee Telugu Awards ===
- 2015 - Lifetime Achievement Award

=== Gulf Andhra Musical Awards (GAMA) ===
- 2015 - Lifetime Achievement Award
