= Bhakta Kannappa =

1976 Indian film by Bapu

- Theatrical release poster
- Directed by: Bapu
- Written by: Mullapudi Venkata Ramana
- Produced by: U. Suryanarayana Raju
- Starring: Krishnam Raju; Vanisree; M. Balaiah; Rao Gopal Rao; Sarathi; Sreedhar Surapaneni; Mukkamala; M. Prabhakar Reddy
- Cinematography: V. S. R. Swamy; M. V. Raghu
- Edited by: Mandapati Ramachandraiah
- Music by: Satyam
- Production company: Gopikrishna Movies
- Release date: May 26, 1976
- Country: India
- Language: Telugu

Bhakta Kannappa (transl. Devotee Kannappa) is a 1976 Indian Telugu-language film directed by Bapu and produced by U. Suryanarayana Raju under the Gopikrishna Movies banner. The film was inspired by the 1954 Kannada movie Bedara Kannappa which was based on the life of the Shaiva devotee, Kannappa. The film stars Krishnam Raju in the title role, along with Vanisree, M. Balaiah, Rao Gopal Rao, Sarathi, and others in supporting roles. The music was composed by Satyam, with lyrics by Arudra, C. Narayana Reddy, and Veturi Sundararama Murthy.

== Plot ==
Arjuna (Krishnam Raju) is reborn as Thinnadu, an atheist who is raised by a tribal lord (M. Prabhakar Reddy). Leela (Vanisree), the tribal lord's daughter, falls in love with Thinna, but Mallanna (Sreedhar) also loves her. Thinna defeats Mallanna in a duel and wins Leela's hand. As an atheist, Thinna refuses to bow to the village goddess and leaves the village with Leela. The story follows Thinna's transformation into a devout follower of Lord Siva, becoming the revered Kannappa.

== Cast ==
- Krishnam Raju in a dual role as
  - Arjuna
  - Kannappa/Thinnadu
- Vanisri as Leela
- M. Balaiah as Lord Shiva
- Rao Gopal Rao as Kailasanatha Shastri
- Sarathi as Kashinatha Shastri
- Allu Ramalingaiah
- Sreedhar as Mallanna
- Prabhakar Reddy as Neela's father
- Mukkamala as Jara Rashtrika (Vedic form of Peddavema Reddy)
- P. R. Varalakshmi as Goddess Parvati
- Jhansi
- Baby Varalakshmi
- Baby Rohini
- Jaya Malini as Ranjana

== Production ==
The film was inspired by Rajkumar’s 1954 film Bedara Kannappa.

Bhakta Kannappa was primarily shot in outdoor locations, including Pattiseema, Gutala, and the forests near Buttayagudem. Filming began in November 1975 and concluded in May 1976. Initially, the project was helmed by V. Madhusudhana Rao, but due to creative differences, Bapu and Mullapudi Venkata Ramana took over the project. Bapu made significant changes to the script, which led to some previously recorded songs being dropped.

The film's artwork, typical of Bapu's style, gave the film an authentic and captivating look. The dialogues, penned by Mullapudi, were noted for their realism and relevance to the characters. Notably, the song "Enniyallo Enniyallo," which appears to be shot on a full moon night, was actually filmed during the day.

== Music ==
The soundtrack for Bhakta Kannappa was composed by Satyam, with lyrics written by Arudra, C. Narayana Reddy, and Veturi Sundararama Murthy. The songs became widely popular, especially "Enniyallo" and "Aakasham Dinchala."

Song	Singers	Cast	Lyrics
"Om Namasivayya"	S. P. Balasubrahmanyam and Chorus	Krishnam Raju, M. Balaiah	Veturi
"Aakasam Dinchala Nelavanka"	V. Ramakrishna, P. Susheela	Krishnam Raju, Vanisree	Arudra
"Enniyallo Enniyallo"	V. Ramakrishna, P. Susheela	Krishnam Raju, Vanisree	Arudra
"Kanda Gelichindi"	V. Ramakrishna, P. Susheela	Krishnam Raju, Vanisree	Arudra
"Siva Siva Ananelaara"	S. Janaki	Rao Gopal Rao, Jayamalini	C. Narayana Reddy
"Thalli Thandri Neevenamma"	P. Susheela	Vanisree	Veturi
"Siva Siva Sankara Bhaktava Sankara"	V. Ramakrishna	Krishnam Raju	Veturi
"Tinavayya Maa Kanna Tandri"	V. Ramakrishna	Krishnam Raju	Veturi
"Om Namasivayya" (reprise)	V. Ramakrishna	Krishnam Raju	Veturi
"Srikalahastiswara Hara Hara"	V. Ramakrishna and Chorus	Krishnam Raju	Veturi

== Reception ==
Bhakta Kannappa was a commercial success running for 100 days in major centres and received widespread acclaim for its music, performances, and technical excellence. This achievement established the Gopikrishna banner, which subsequently produced other successful films, including Amaradeepam (1977) and Mana Oori Pandavulu (1978).

== Awards ==
- National Film Award for Best Audiography - S. P. Ramanathan
