= Jayamalini =

Indian actress

- Born: Alamelu Manga; Chennai, Tamil Nadu, India
- Occupation: Actress
- Years active: 1975–1994
- Spouse: Parthiban (m. 1994)
- Children: 1

Jayamalini (or Jaya Malini) is an Indian actress who has acted in more than 500 Telugu, Tamil, Malayalam, Kannada and Hindi movies.

== Personal life ==
She married Parthiban, a police inspector on 19 July 1994 and settled in Chennai with her only son. In 2005, the former actress and dancer was busy looking for a writer to help pen her biography.

== Selected filmography ==
=== Telugu ===
- Aadadani Adrustam (1975)
- Annadammula Anubandham (1975)
- Guna Vanthudu (1975)
- Mutyala Muggu (1975)
- Padi Pantalu (1976) as Kondamma
- Bhakta Kannappa (1976)
- Bhale Dongalu (1976)
- Magaadu (1976)
- Ramarajamlo Rakthpasham (1976)
- Vintha Illu Santhagola (1976)
- Amara Deepam ("Kottaga Unda Badhaga Unda" song) (1977)
- Ardhangi (1977)
- Chakradhari (1977)
- Chanakya Chandragupta (1977)
- Daana Veera Soora Karna (1977)
- Devathalara Deevinchandi (1977)
- Gadusu Pillodu (1977) as James' accomplice
- Khaidi Kalidas (1977)
- Yamagola ("Gudivada Ellanu" song) (1977)
- Indradhanussu (1978) as Shakuntala
- Agent Gopi (1978) as Rita
- Annadammula Savaal (1978)
- Athani Kante Ghanudu (1978)
- Manavoori Pandavulu (1978)
- Chal Mohana Ranga (1978)
- Jaganmohini (1978)
- Mugguru Muggure (1978) as Rita
- Nayudu Bava (1978)
- Pottelu Punnamma (1978)
- Simha Baludu (1978)
- Bomma Boruse Jeevitham (1979)
- Burripalem Bulludu (1979)
- Cheyyethi Jai Kottu (1979)
- Driver Ramudu ("Guggu Guggu Gudisundi" song) (1979)
- Melu Kolupu (1979)
- Muthaiduva (1979)
- Sri Rama Bantu (1979)
- Sama Janiki Sawal (1979)
- Hema Hemeelu (1979)
- Tiger (1979)
- Vetagaadu ("Puttintollu Tarimesaaru" song) (1979)
- Yugandhar (1979)
- Shri Vinayaka Vijayamu (1979)
- Gandharva Kanya (1979) as Jayanthi
- Sita Ramulu (1980)
- Kiladi Krishnudu (1980)
- Venkateswara Vratha Mahatyam (1980) as Ranjani
- Aatagadu ("Eko Narayana" song) (1980)
- Konte Mogudu Penki Pellam (1980) as Navaneetham
- Superman (1980)
- Gayyali Gangamma (1980)
- Challenge Ramudu (1980)
- Mama Allulla Saval (1980) as Vasantha/Raji
- Punnami Naagu (1980)
- Ragile Jwala (1981)
- Sri Vemana Charithra (1981)
- Antham Kadidi Aarambam (1981)
- Gaja Donga ("Nee Illu Bangaaram Gaanu" song) (1981)
- Kaliyuga Ramudu (1982)
- Bobbili Puli ("O Subba Rao" song) (1982)
- Samshare Shanker (1982)
- Manishiko Charithra (1982)
- Billa Ranga (1982)
- Yamakinkarudu (1982)
- Pralaya Rudrudu (1982) as Dancer in Recreation Club
- Siripuram Monagadu (1983)
- Maga Maharaju ("Maa Amma Chintamani" song) (1983)
- Simhapuri Simham (1983)
- "Gudachari No 1" (1983)
- Rajkumar (1983)
- Police Venkataswami (1983)
- Puli Debba (1983)
- Ramudu Kadu Krishnudu (1983)
- Chattaniki Veyyi Kallu (1983) as Swapna
- Kirayi Kotigadu (1983)
- Chanda Sasanudu (1983)
- James Bond 999 (1984)
- Kondaveeti Nagulu (1984) as Malli
- Merupu Daadi (1984) as Mala
- Bharatamlo Sankharavam (1984)
- Police Papanna (1984)
- Daku (1984)
- Hero (1984)
- Jagan (1984)
- Iddaru Dongalu (1984)
- Garjana (1985)
- Kongumudi (1985) as Sakkubai
- Vande Mataram (1985)
- Maharaju (1985)
- Bhale Thammudu (1985) item song
- Jwala ("Oka Jyothinai" song) (1985)
- Mayaladi (1985) as Thief who ransacks the police constable's house
- Cowboy No 1 (1986)
- Padaharella Ammayi (1986)
- Krishna Garadi (1986)
- Ugra Narasimham (1986)
- Jailu Pakshi (1986)
- Aadi Dampathulu (1987)
- Ida Prapancham (1987)
- Ramu (1987)
- Hanthakudi Veta (1987)
- Agni Keratalu (1988) as Chanchala
- Intinti Bhagavatham (1988)
- Rowdy No 1 (1988)
- State Rowdy (1989) as Urvashi
- Koduku Diddina Kapuram (1989)
- Ramudu Kadu Rakshasudu (1991)

=== Tamil ===
- Salem Vishnu (1990)
- Aalay Pathu Malai Mathu (1990)
- Rathinapuri Ilavarasan (1989)
- Anthapura Marmam (1988)
- Makkal En Pakkam (1987)
- Kudumbam Oru Koyil (1987)
- Raja Nee Vazhga (1986)
- Andha Oru Nimidam (1985)
- Mayavi (1985)
- Erimalai (1985)
- Kutravaaligal (1985)
- Karuppu Sattaikaran (1985)
- Naam Iruvar (1985)
- Enaintha Kodugal (1985)
- Visha Kanni (1985)
- Andavan Sothu (1985)
- Malaiyoor Mambattiyan (1984)
- 24 Mani Neram (1984)
- Uravai Katha Kili (1984)
- Nalla Naal (1984)
- Kudumbam (1984)
- Sarithira Nayagan (1984)
- Ullam Uruguthadi (1984)
- Veetuku Oru Kannagi (1984)
- Idhu Enga Bhoomi (1984)
- Nyayam Ketkiren (1984)
- Ennai Paar En Azhagai Paar (1983)
- Pani Puyal (1983)
- Raja Mohini (1983)
- Imaigal (1983)
- Ragam Thedum Pallavi (1982)
- Azhagiya Laila (1982)
- Mullillatha Roja (1982)
- Gopurangal Saivathillai (1982)
- Krodham (1982)
- Nadodi Raja (1982)
- Valibamey Vaa Vaa (1982)
- Marumagale Vazhga (1982)
- Thunaivi (1982)
- Kuppathu Ponnu (1982)
- Garjanai (1981)
- Sorgathin Thirappu Vizha (1981)
- Lorry Driver Rajakannu (1981)
- Kaalam (1981)
- Guru (1980)
- Maaya Mohini (1980)
- Anbukku Naan Adimai (1980)
- Naan Potta Savaal (1980)
- Raman Parasuraman (1980)
- Bombay Mail 109 (1980)
- Natchathiram (1980)
- Andharangam Oomaiyanathu (1980)
- Engal Vathiyar (1980)
- Yamanukku Yaman (1980)
- Gandharva Kanni (1979)
- Nadagame Ulagam (1979)
- Kadavul Amaitha Medai (1979)
- Annai Oru Aalayam (1979)
- Velli Ratham (1979)
- Kannan Oru Kai Kuzhandhai (1978)
- Jaganmohini (1978)
- Karate Kamala (1978)
- Thai Meedhu Sathiyam (1978)
- Alli Darbar (1978)
- Thaaliya Salangaiya (1977)
- Aattukara Alamelu (1977)
- Sahodara Sapatham (1977)
- Sainthadamma Sainthadu (1977)
- Penn Jenmam (1977)
- Maharasi Vazhga (1976)
- Dr. Siva (1975) - Debut in Tamil

=== Kannada ===
- Guru Shishyaru (1981)
- Bangarada Gudi (1976)
- Baddi Bangaramma
- Gayathri Maduve (1983)
- Rusthum Jodi (1981)
- Nanna Devaru (1982)
- Jayasimha
- Onde Guri (1979)
- Maralina Sarapali
- Matte Vasanta
- Sedina Hakki
- Kudure Mukha
- Muttaide Bhagya
- Police Papanna
- Sahodarara Savaal (1977)
- Sowbhagya Lakshmi
- Prachanda Kulla
- Bengaluru Ratriyalli
- Haddina Kannu
- Praja Prabhuthva
- Senha Sambandha
- Srhi Chamnudeshwari Pooja Mahime
- Vasantha Lakshmi (1978)
- Kiladi Jodi

=== Malayalam ===
- Omanakunju (1975)
- Kaduvaye Pidicha Kiduva (1977)
- Aavesham (1979) as Rathi
- Sarapanjaram (1979)
- Shakti (1980)
- Nayattu (1980)
- Lava (1980)
- Hridayam Padunnu (1980)
- Poochasanyasi (1981)
- Dwanda Yudham (1981)
- Adima Changala (1981)
- Pineyum Pookkunna Kaadu (1981)
- Akkramanam (1981)
- Sanchari (1981)
- Kaahalam (1981)
- Paathira Sooran (1981)
- Thadavara (1981)
- Sreeman Sreemathi (1981)
- Chambalkkadu (1982)
- Kalam (1982)
- Amritageetham (1982)
- Kaathirunna Divasam (1983)
- Kilikonchal (1984)
- Shathru (1985)
- Urukku Manushyan (1986)
- Ee Noottandile Maharogam (1987)
- Deerga Sumangalee Bava (1988)
- Abkari (1988)
- Prabhatham Chuvanna Theruvil (1989)
- Kadathanadan Ambadi (1990)
- Criminals (1994)

=== Hindi ===
- Jeevan Jyoti (1976) as Sudha
- Shalimar (1978) as Tribal Dancer
- Lok Parlok (1979)
- Maha Shaktimaan (1988) as Dancer
- Yuvraaj (1979) as one of the two dancers
