= 25th Filmfare Awards South =

Award ceremony for South Indian films

- Date: 1978
- Site: Chennai

The 25th Filmfare Awards South ceremony honoring the winners of the best of South Indian cinema in 1977 was held in Madras in 1978.

== Awards ==
=== Kannada cinema ===
Best Film	Best Director
Tabbaliyu Neenade Magane - B. M. Venkatesh, Chandulal Jain	K. S. Prakash Rao - Ganda Hendathi
Best Actor	Best Actress
Manu - Tabbaliyu Neenade Magane	Manjula - Deepa

=== Malayalam cinema ===
Best Film	Best Director
Itha Ivide Vare - Hari Pothan	I. V. Sasi - Itha Ivide Vare
Best Actor	Best Actress
Madhu - Yudhakaandam	Sheela - Lakshmi

=== Tamil cinema ===
Best Film	Best Director
Bhuvana Oru Kelvi Kuri - Panju Arunachalam	S. P. Muthuraman - Bhuvana Oru Kelvi Kuri
Best Actor	Best Actress
Kamal Haasan - 16 Vayathinile	Sujatha - Avargal

=== Telugu cinema ===
Best Film	Best Director
Adavi Ramudu - N.V.V. Satyanarayana	K. Raghavendra Rao - Premalekhalu
Best Actor	Best Actress
Krishnam Raju - Amaradeepam	Jayasudha - Aame Katha

=== Special awards ===
Special Commendation Award for Performance
- Sridevi - 16 Vayathinile
