= Filmfare Award for Best Actress – Telugu =

Indian annual film award

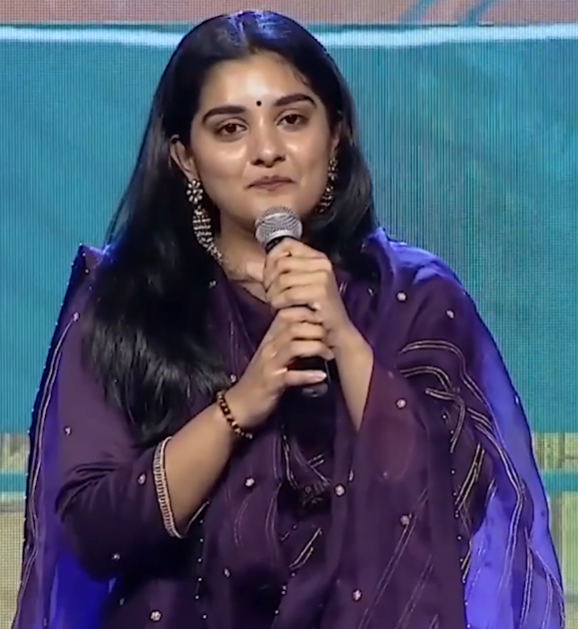
- The 2024 recipient: Nivetha Thomas
- Awarded for: Best Performance by an Actress in a leading role in Telugu films
- Country: India
- Presented by: Filmfare
- First award: 1972
- Currently held by: Nivetha Thomas for 35 Chinna Katha Kaadu (2024)

Highlights
- Most wins: Vijaya Shanthi (6)
- Most nominations: Jayasudha (10)
- Website: Official website

The Filmfare Award for Best Actress – Telugu is given by the Filmfare magazine as part of its annual Filmfare Awards South for Telugu films. The awards were extended to "Best Actress" in 1972. The year in the following table indicates when the film was released.

== Winners and nominees ==
Table key
‡	Indicates the winner

=== 1970s ===
Year	Actress	Role(s)	Film	Ref.
1972	J. Jayalalithaa ‡	Satyabhama / Chandrasena	Sri Krishna Satya	
1973	Vanisri ‡	Roja	Jeevana Tarangalu	
1974	Vanisri ‡	Krishnaveni	Krishnaveni	
1974	Roja Ramani		O Seeta Katha	
1974	Vijaya Nirmala	Seeta	Alluri Seetarama Raju	
1975	Vanisri ‡	Lakshmi / Sobha	Jeevana Jyothi	
1975	Annapurna	Annapoorna	Swargam Narakam	
1975	Sangeeta	Lakshmi	Mutyala Muggu	
1976	Jayasudha ‡	Jyothi	Jyothi	
1976	Jaya Prada	Saritha	Anthuleni Katha	
1976	Jaya Prada	Lalitha	Siri Siri Muvva	
1976	Madhavi	Hyma	Oorummadi Brathukulu	
1976	Vanisri	Radha	Aradhana	
1977	Jayasudha ‡		Aame Katha	
1977	Jaya Prada	Padma	Adavi Ramudu	
1977	Lakshmi		Panthulamma	
1977	Sripriya	Malli	Chilakamma Cheppindi	
1977	Vanisri	Radha	Edureeta	
1978	Talluri Rameswari ‡	Seetalu	Seetamalakshmi	
1978	Mamata Shankar	Nilamma	Oka Oori Katha	
1978	Roopa		Naalaaga Endaro	
1978	Saritha	Swapna	Maro Charitra	
1978	Sridevi	Malli	Padaharella Vayasu	
1979	Sujatha ‡	Vidya	Guppedu Manasu	
1979	Jayasudha	Suhasini	Idi Katha Kaadu	
1979	Sarada		Nimajjanam	
1979	Sowcar Janaki	Tayaramma	Tayaramma Bangarayya	
1979	Sridevi	Radha	Karthika Deepam	

=== 1980s ===
Year	Actress	Role(s)	Film	Ref.
1980	Jyothi ‡	ASP Vyjayanthi	Vamsa Vruksham	
1980	Jaya Prada	Chandipriya	Chandipriya	
1980	Jayasudha		Pilla Zamindar	
1980	Suryakantham		Gayyali Gangamma	
1980	Vanisri		Mahalakshmi	
1981	Radhika Sarathkumar ‡	Bharathi Devi	Nyayam Kavali	
1981	Jaya Prada	Vaishali	47 Rojulu	
1981	Jayasudha	Jayanthi	Premabhishekam	
1981	Poornima	Durga	Mudda Mandaram	
1981	Sridevi	Devi	Premabhishekam	
1982	Jayasudha ‡		Griha Pravesham	
1982	Jaya Prada	Padma	Meghasandesam	
1982	Madhavi	Jayalaxmi	Intlo Ramayya Veedhilo Krishnayya	
1982	Radhika Sarathkumar	Lalithamba	Patnam Vachina Pativrathalu	
1982	Sumalatha	Sujatha	Subhalekha	
1983	Jaya Prada ‡	Madhavi	Sagara Sangamam	
1983	Jayasudha		Dharmaatmudu	
1983	Radhika Sarathkumar	Archana	Abhilasha	
1983	Saritha		Kokilamma	
1983	Vijayashanti		Neti Bharatam	
1984	Suhasini Maniratnam ‡	Swati	Swathi	
1984	Bhanupriya	Sitara / Kokila	Sitaara	
1984	Jayasudha	Jayanthi	Justice Chakravarthy	
1984	Poornima	Swarna	Srivariki Premalekha	
1984	Radha	Madhavi / Mary	Vasantha Geetam	
1985	Vijayashanti ‡	Jhansi	Pratighatana	
1985	Bhanupriya	Hema	Anveshana	
1985	Jayasudha		Bharyabhartala Bandham	
1985	Sudha Chandran	Mayuri Olpam	Mayuri	
1985	Suhasini Maniratnam	Sravanti	Sravanthi	
1986	Lakshmi ‡		Sravana Meghalu	
1986	Khushbu Sundar	Bharathi	Kaliyuga Pandavulu	
1986	Radhika Sarathkumar	Lalitha	Swathi Muthyam	
1986	Radha		Pasupu Thadu	
1986	Suhasini Maniratnam	Subhashini	Sirivennela	
1987	Vijayashanti ‡	Ganga	Swayamkrushi	
1987	Bhanupriya	SI Vidya	Dharmapatni	
1987	Rajani	Padma	Aha Naa Pellanta	
1987	Suhasini Maniratnam	Uma	Samsaram Oka Chadarangam	
1987	Sumalatha	Sita	Sruthilayalu	
1988	Bhanupriya ‡	Meenakshi	Swarnakamalam	
1988	Archana	Kamalakshi	Daasi	
1988	Shobana	Lalitha Sivajyoti	Rudraveena	
1988	Sridevi	Pravallika	Aakhari Poratam	
1988	Vijayashanti	Janaki / Lakshmi	Janaki Ramudu	
1989	Vijayashanti ‡		Bharatha Nari	
1989	Amala Akkineni	Asha	Siva	
1989	Girija Shettar	Geethanjali	Geethanjali	
1989	Ramya Krishnan	Maggie	Sutradharulu	
1989	Revathi	Seethalu	Prema	

=== 1990s ===
Year	Actress	Role(s)	Film	Ref.
1990	Vijayashanti ‡	ASP Vyjayanthi	Karthavyam	
1990	Divya Bharti	Rani	Bobbili Raja	
1990	Malashri	Neelima	Prema Khaidi	
1990	Radha	Bijili	Kodama Simham	
1990	Shobana	Kalyani	Alludugaru	
1990	Sridevi	Indraja	Jagadeka Veerudu Athiloka Sundari	
1991	Sridevi ‡	Satya	Kshana Kshanam	
1991	Divyavani	Satyabhama	Pelli Pustakam	
1991	Meena	Seeta	Seetharamayya Gari Manavaralu	
1991	Sarada	Rajinama	Amma Rajinama	
1991	Shobana	Anjali	Rowdy Gaari Pellam	
1992	Revathi ‡	Sindhura	Ankuram	
1992	Divya Bharti	Chittemma	Chittemma Mogudu	
1992	Meena	Nandini	Chanti	
1992	Meenakshi Seshadri	Hema	Aapadbandhavudu	
1992	Nagma	Uma Devi	Gharana Mogudu	
1993	Vijayashanti ‡		Police Lockup	
1993	Aamani	Jhansi / Goddess Lakshmi	Mister Pellam	
1993	Madhavi	Sarada	Matru Devo Bhava	
1993	Ramya Krishnan	Lalita Rani	Allari Priyudu	
1993	Revathi	Anitha	Gaayam	
1994	Aamani ‡	Radha	Subhalagnam	
1994	Jayasudha	Savitri	Bangaru Kutumbam	
1994	Ooha	Ooha	Aame	
1994	Radhika Sarathkumar	Seetha	Palnati Pourusham	
1995	Soundarya ‡	Bhavani	Ammoru	
1995	Aamani	Ganga	Subha Sankalpam	
1995	Indraja	Neelima	Sogasu Chooda Tarama!	
1995	Maheswari	Pooja	Gulabi	
1995	Rohini		Stri	
1996	Tabu ‡	Mahalakshmi	Ninne Pelladata	
1996	Rambha	Raga Sudha	Bombay Priyudu	
1996	Ravali	Kalyani	Pelli Sandadi	
1996	Shilpa Shetty	Bangaram	Sahasa Veerudu Sagara Kanya	
1996	Soundarya	Radha	Pavitra Bandham	
1997	Vijayashanti ‡	Ramulamma	Osey Ramulamma	
1997	Anjala Zaveri	Kaveri	Preminchukundam Raa	
1997	Maheswari	Maheswari	Pelli	
1997	Sanghavi	Baby	Sindhooram	
1997	Soundarya	Subbalakshmi	Dongaata	
1998	Soundarya ‡	Bhanumati	Anthahpuram	
1998	Isha Koppikar	Lekha	Chandralekha	
1998	Keerthi Reddy	Anu	Tholi Prema	
1998	Preity Zinta	Shailaja	Premante Idera	
1998	Ramya Krishna	Jyothi	Kante Koothurne Kanu	
1999	Soundarya ‡	Anjali	Raja	
1999	Antara Mali	Divya	Prema Katha	
1999	Maheswari	Sasirekha	Nee Kosam	
1999	Prema	Devi	Devi	
1999	Raasi	Mahalakshmi	Preyasi Raave	

=== 2000s ===
Year	Actress	Role(s)	Film	Ref.
2000	Richa Pallod ‡	Madhu	Nuvve Kavali	
2000	Laya	Usha	Manoharam	
2000	Soundarya	Uma	Jayam Manadera	
2000	Soundarya	Gajjala Kanaka Maha Lakshmi Devi	Annayya	
2001	Bhumika Chawla ‡	Madhumati	Kushi	
2001	Laya	Meena	Preminchu	
2001	Simran	Sravani	Narasimha Naidu	
2001	Sonali Bendre	Vasundhara	Murari	
2002	Sadha ‡	Sujatha	Jayam	
2002	Aarthi Agarwal	Krishna Veni	Nuvvu Leka Nenu Lenu	
2002	Kalyani	Swathi	Avunu Valliddaru Ista Paddaru!	
2002	Shriya Saran	Bhanu	Santosham	
2003	Asin ‡	Mugambigambal	Amma Nanna O Tamila Ammayi	
2003	Asin	Vasanta	Sivamani	
2003	Bhumika Chawla	Meghana	Missamma	
2003	Sridevi Vijaykumar	Geetanjali	Ninne Ishtapaddanu	
2004	Trisha Krishnan ‡	Sailaja	Varsham	
2004	Jyothika	Anjali	Mass	
2004	Kamalinee Mukherjee	Roopa	Anand	
2004	Katrina Kaif	Malliswari	Malliswari	
2004	Shriya Saran	Anu	Nenunnanu	
2005	Trisha Krishnan ‡	Siri	Nuvvostanante Nenoddantana	
2005	Ayesha Takia	Siri Valli	Super	
2005	Charmy Kaur	Sahasra	Anukokunda Oka Roju	
2005	Shriya Saran	Neelu	Chatrapathi	
2005	Trisha Krishnan	Poori	Athadu	
2006	Genelia D'Souza ‡	Haasini Rao	Bommarillu	
2006	Aarthi Agarwal	Radha	Andala Ramudu	
2006	Ileana D'Cruz	Shruti	Pokiri	
2006	Jyothika	Madhurima	Shock	
2006	Kamalinee Mukherjee	Seetha Mahalakshmi	Godavari	
2007	Trisha Krishnan ‡	Keerti / Kusumamba	Aadavari Matalaku Arthale Verule	
2007	Bhumika Chawla	Anasuya	Anasuya	
2007	Charmy Kaur		Mantra	
2007	Genelia D'Souza	Pooja	Dhee	
2007	Nayanthara	Vasundhara	Tulasi	
2008	Swathi Reddy ‡	Lavanya	Ashta Chamma	
2008	Ileana D'Cruz	Bhagyamathi	Jalsa	
2008	Kamalinee Mukherjee	Janaki	Gamyam	
2008	Shweta Basu Prasad	Swapna	Kotha Bangaru Lokam	
2008	Trisha Krishnan	Sandhya	Krishna	
2009	Anushka Shetty ‡	Arundhati Jr / Arundhati Sr "Jejamma"	Arundhati	
2009	Ileana D'Cruz	Naina	Kick	
2009	Kajal Aggarwal	Indira / Mithravinda Devi	Magadheera	
2009	Kamalinee Mukherjee	Gopika	Gopi Gopika Godavari	
2009	Tamannaah Bhatia	Geeta Subramanyam	Konchem Ishtam Konchem Kashtam	

=== 2010s ===
Year	Actress	Role(s)	Film	Ref.
2010	Anushka Shetty ‡	Saroja	Vedam	
2010	Anushka Shetty	Chandramukhi / Nagavalli	Nagavalli	
2010	Kajal Aggarwal	Nandini	Darling	
2010	Nayanthara	Gayatri	Simha	
2010	Samantha	Jessie Thekekuthu	Ye Maaya Chesave	
2011	Nayanthara ‡	Sita	Sri Rama Rajyam	
2011	Kajal Aggarwal	Priya	Mr. Perfect	
2011	Nithya Menen	Nithya	Ala Modalaindi	
2011	Samantha	Prasanthi Ajay Kumar	Dookudu	
2011	Tamannaah Bhatia	Mahalakshmi	100% Love	
2012	Samantha ‡	Bindu	Eega	
2012	Anushka Shetty	Maheswari	Damarukam	
2012	Hansika Motwani	Sharmila	Denikaina Ready	
2012	Nayanthara	Devika	Krishnam Vande Jagadgurum	
2012	Tamannaah Bhatia	Chaitra	Racha	
2013	Nithya Menen ‡	Sravani	Gunde Jaari Gallanthayyinde	
2013	Anushka Shetty	Vennela	Mirchi	
2013	Nanditha Raj	Nanditha	Prema Katha Chitram	
2013	Rakul Preet Singh	Prarthana	Venkatadri Express	
2013	Samantha	Sashi	Attarintiki Daredi	
2014	Shruti Haasan ‡	Spandana	Race Gurram	
2014	Kajal Aggarwal	Satya	Govindudu Andarivadele	
2014	Pooja Hegde	Nandana	Oka Laila Kosam	
2014	Rakul Preet Singh	Chandrakala	Loukyam	
2014	Samantha	Krishna Veni / Priya	Manam	
2015	Anushka Shetty ‡	Rudrama Devi	Rudhramadevi	
2015	Hebah Patel	Meena Kumari	Kumari 21F	
2015	Nithya Menen	Nazeera Khanum	Malli Malli Idi Rani Roju	
2015	Shruti Haasan	Charuseela	Srimanthudu	
2015	Tamannaah Bhatia	Avantika	Baahubali: The Beginning	
2016	Samantha ‡	Anasuya Ramalingam	A Aa	
2016	Keerthy Suresh	Sailaja	Nenu Sailaja	
2016	Lavanya Tripathi	Seetha	Soggade Chinni Nayana	
2016	Nivetha Thomas	Catherine	Gentleman	
2016	Rakul Preet Singh	Divyanka Krishnamurthy	Nannaku Prematho	
2016	Ritu Varma	Chitra	Pelli Choopulu	
2017	Sai Pallavi ‡	Bhanumati	Fidaa	
2017	Anushka Shetty	Devasena	Baahubali 2: The Conclusion	
2017	Nivetha Thomas	Pallavi	Ninnu Kori	
2017	Rakul Preet Singh	Bhramaramba	Rarandoi Veduka Chudham	
2017	Ritika Singh	Rameswari	Guru	
2018	Keerthy Suresh ‡	Savitri	Mahanati	
2018	Aditi Rao Hydari	Sameera Rathore	Sammohanam	
2018	Anushka Shetty	Bhaagamathie / Chanchala IAS	Bhaagamathie	
2018	Pooja Hegde	Aravindha	Aravinda Sametha Veera Raghava	
2018	Rashmika Mandanna	Geetha	Geetha Govindam	
2018	Samantha	Ramalakshmi	Rangasthalam	
2019	AWARDS FUNCTION WAS SUSPENDED DUE TO COVID-19 PANDEMIC			

=== 2020s ===
Year	Actress	Role(s)	Film	Ref.
2020 / 21	Sai Pallavi ‡	Mounika Rani	Love Story	
2020 / 21	Sai Pallavi	Rosie / Maithreyi	Shyam Singha Roy	
2020 / 21	Chandini Chowdary	Deepthi Varma	Colour Photo	
2020 / 21	Krithi Shetty	Sangeetha "Bebamma"	Uppena	
2020 / 21	Pooja Hegde	Amulya	Ala Vaikunthapurramuloo	
2020 / 21	Rashmika Mandanna	Chaitra	Bheeshma	
2020 / 21	Rashmika Mandanna	Srivalli	Pushpa: The Rise	
2022	Mrunal Thakur ‡	Princess Noor Jahan / Sita Mahalakshmi	Sita Ramam	
2022	Aishwarya Lekshmi	Amudha Ravindranath	Ammu	
2022	Nazriya Nazim	Leela Thomas	Ante Sundaraniki	
2022	Neha Shetty	Radhika	DJ Tillu	
2022	Nithya Menen	Suguna	Bheemla Nayak	
2022	Sai Pallavi	Vennela	Virata Parvam	
2022	Samantha	Yashoda	Yashoda	
2023	Keerthy Suresh ‡	Vennala	Dasara	
2023	Mrunal Thakur	Yashna	Hi Nanna	
2023	Vaishnavi Chaitanya	Vaishnavi	Baby	
2023	Anushka Shetty	Anvitha Ravali Shetty	Miss Shetty Mr Polishetty	
2023	Samantha	Shakuntala	Shaakuntalam	
2024	Nivetha Thomas ‡	Bala Saraswati	35 Chinna Katha Kaadu	
2024	Anupama Parameswaran	Lilly Joseph	Tillu Square	
2024	Ashika Ranganath	Varalakshmi	Naa Saami Ranga	
2024	Meenakshi Chaudhary	Sumathi	Lucky Baskhar	
2024	Priyanka Mohan	Charulatha	Saripodhaa Sanivaaram	
2024	Rashmika Mandanna	Srivalli	Pushpa 2: The Rule	

== Superlatives ==
Superlative	Actress	Record
Most awards	Vijaya Shanthi	6 wins
Most Consecutive wins	Vanisri	3 (1972 - 1974)
Oldest winner	Anushka Shetty	34 years
Oldest Nominee	Anushka Shetty	43 years
Youngest winner	Jayasudha	18 years, 241 days
Youngest nominees	Sridevi, Divya Bharti	16 years
Most Nominations	Jayasudha	10
Most Nominations without a win	Pooja Hegde Rashmika Mandanna	4

- Vanisri won the award the most times in the 70's with three wins. Vijayashanti won the most in the 80s and 90s with three wins each decade. In the 90s, Soundarya had three wins. Trisha Krishnan won the award three times in 2000s, while Anushka Shetty and Samantha Ruth Prabhu has the most wins in 2010s with two wins.
- Jayasudha and Tabu are the two actress who have won both Filmfare Award for Best Actress – Telugu and Filmfare Award for Best Supporting Actress – Telugu.
- Seven actresses have won the awards in consecutive years: Vanisri (1973–1975), Jayasudha (1976–1977), Vijayashanti (1989–1990), Soundarya (1998–1999), Trisha Krishnan (2004–2005), Anushka Shetty (2009–2010). Vanisri is the only actress to win the award three times consecutively.
- J. Jayalalithaa, Revathi and Samantha Ruth Prabhu are the only actresses to win both Filmfare Award for Best Actress – Tamil and Filmfare Award for Best Actress – Telugu in the same year for their performances in the year 1972, 1992 and 2012 respectively.
- Seven actresses have won the Filmfare Award for Best Actress – Telugu for their debut Telugu films. In chronological order Sujatha (1979), Radhika Sarathkumar (1981), Richa Pallod (2000), Sadha (2002), Asin (2003), Sai Pallavi (2017) and Mrunal Thakur (2022).
- Nithya Menen is the first actress to win both the Filmfare Award for Best Actress – Telugu (in 2013) and the Filmfare Critics Award for Best Actress – Telugu (in 2015).
- Sai Pallavi is the first actress who won both Filmfare Award for Best Actress – Telugu and the Filmfare Critics Award for Best Actress – Telugu awards in the same year (2022).
- Vijayashanti and Keerthy Suresh both have won Filmfare Award for Best Actress – Telugu and National Film Award for Best Actress for their performances in Kartavyam (1990) and Mahanati (2018) respectively.
- Jayasudha has received the most nominations with Ten, followed by Anushka Shetty, and Samantha Ruth Prabhu each with nine nominations.
- In 1981, the one and only time till date, two actresses were nominated for the same film: Jayasudha and Sridevi for Premabhishekam.

== Multiple wins ==
The following individuals have received multiple Best Actress awards:

Wins	Actress
6	Vijayashanti
3	Vanisri, Jayasudha, Soundarya, Trisha Krishnan, Anushka Shetty
2	Samantha, Sai Pallavi, Keerthy Suresh

=== Multiple nominations ===
The following individuals have received multiple Best Actress nominations:

Nominations	Actress
10	Jayasudha
9	Anushka Shetty, Samantha
8	Vijayashanti
7	Jaya Prada, Soundarya
6	Vanisri, Sridevi
5	Radhika Sarathkumar, Trisha Krishnan

== Notes ==
- Ramachandran, T.M. (1973). Film world. Vol. 9.
- Collections. Update Video Publication. 1991.
- The Times of India directory and year book including who's who. Times of India Press. 1984.
