= Jeevana Chakra =

- DVD cover
- Directed by: H. R. Bhargava
- Written by: Chi. Udaya Shankar (Dialogue)
- Screenplay by: H. R. Bhargava
- Story by: M. Prabhakar Reddy
- Based on: Dharmaatmudu (1983) by Bairisetty Bhaskara Rao
- Produced by: H. R. Bhargava; D. V. Rajaram
- Starring: Vishnuvardhan; Radhika
- Cinematography: D. V. Rajaram
- Edited by: Yadav Victor
- Music by: Rajan–Nagendra
- Production company: Kalakruthi
- Release date: 19 September 1985
- Running time: 149 minutes
- Country: India
- Language: Kannada

Jeevana Chakra ( transl. The Circle of Life) is a 1985 Kannada-language film starring Vishnuvardhan, Radhika and Ramesh Bhat, and directed by H. R. Bhargava. The film was a remake of the 1983 Telugu film Dharmaatmudu.

== Cast ==
- Vishnuvardhan as Ranganath
- Radhika as Uma
- Vijayakashi as Vinod
- Saroja as Priya
- Ramesh Bhat
- C. R. Simha as Security officer Jagadeesh
- Sudheer
- Chi. Udayashankar
- Shankar Rao (actor)
- Jayamalini
- Anuradha
- Janaki
- B. Jayashree
- Bharani
- Shivaprakash
- Suryakumar
- Bemel Somanna
- Janardhan
- Ramdas
- Shankar Patil
- Karanth
- Prakash
- Phani Ramachandra
- Swagath Jayaram
- Roger Narayan as Krishna

== Soundtrack ==
The music was composed by Rajan–Nagendra.

No.	Song	Singers	Lyrics	Length (m:ss)
1	"Ananda Ananda"	S. Janaki, S. P. Balasubrahmanyam	Chi. Udaya Shankar	04:58
2	"Aakashavu Ee Bhoomiyu"	S. Janaki, S. P. Balasubrahmanyam	Chi. Udaya Shankar	04:33
3	"Nannavaru Yaaru Illa"	S. P. Balasubrahmanyam	Chi. Udaya Shankar	04:48
4	"Olleya Vayaside"	S. Janaki, S. P. Balasubrahmanyam, Vani Jairam	Chi. Udaya Shankar	04:46
