= Gruha Pravesam (1982 film) =

1982 film by Bairisetty Bhaskara Rao

- Directed by: Bairisetty Bhaskara Rao
- Produced by: Yadavalli Vijayendra Reddy
- Starring: Mohan Babu; Jayasudha; Gummadi; Ranganath; M. Prabhakar Reddy; Giribabu
- Edited by: Nageshwar Rao
- Music by: Satyam
- Production company: Sri Vighneshwara Pictures
- Release date: 20 February 1982
- Country: India
- Language: Telugu

Gruha Pravesam is a 1982 Telugu-language drama film directed by Bairisetty Bhaskara Rao and produced by Yadavalli Vijayendra Reddy. The film stars Mohan Babu, Jayasudha, Gummadi, and Prabhakar Reddy Kavitha. Satyam composed the film's music. The film was remade in Kannada as Gruha Pravesa (1991).

== Cast ==
- Mohan Babu as Madhu
- Jayasudha as Lakshmi
- Gummadi as Lakshmi's father
- Prabhakar Reddy as Madhu's father
- Ranganath
- Giribabu
- Kavitha

== Soundtrack ==
1. Daari chupina devatha nee cheyi ennadu veedaka - Singer : Jesudas

== Awards ==
Filmfare Awards South

- 1982 - Jayasudha Won Filmfare Award for Best Actress - Telugu

Nandi Awards

- 1982 - Nandi Award for Second Best Story Writer - M. Prabhakar Reddy
