= Prabha (actress) =

Telugu actress and dancer

- Born: Koti Surya Prabha; 23 March 1961 (age 65); Tenali, Andhra Pradesh, India
- Other name: Jayaprabha
- Occupations: Actress, classical dancer
- Years active: 1974 - present
- Spouse: Ramesh

Prabha is an Indian actress and Kuchipudi dancer from Andhra Pradesh. She has acted about 125 films in Telugu, Tamil, Malayalam and Kannada alongside popular Telugu actors such as N. T. Rama Rao and Akkineni Nageswara Rao. She won two Nandi Awards.

== Career ==
=== Dancer ===
She learnt Kuchipudi dance as a child, but took it up full-time when she found the right guru. Her dance debut and marriage both happened at the same time. She gave 40 performances in the USA.

=== Accident ===
When she was in a film shoot she met with an accident where the car was tilted over and boiling water from the radiator spilled onto her legs. She suffered from those burns for nearly two months. She has mentioned this in a Telugu television Talk show called Alitho Saradaga which telecasts on ETV.

== Filmography ==
Year	Film	Role	Language	Notes
1974	Needa Leni Aadathe		Telugu	Debut in Telugu
1974	Bhoomi Kosam	Susheela	Telugu	
1975	Ammayilu Jagratha		Telugu	
1975	Annadammula Katha		Telugu	
1975	Ramayya Thandri		Telugu	
1976	Mahatmudu		Telugu	
1976	Mahakavi Kshetrayya	Rukmini	Telugu	
1976	Alludochadu	Sridevi	Telugu	
1976	Vintha Illu Santha Gola		Telugu	
1976	Manchiki Maro Peru	Chandrika	Telugu	
1976	Kolleti Kaapuram	Suguna	Telugu	
1977	Daana Veera Soora Karna		Telugu	
1977	Devathalara Deevinchandi	Savitri	Telugu	
1977	Aame Katha		Telugu	
1977	Jeevithamlo Vasantham	Saroja	Telugu	
1977	Swarganiki Nicchenalu		Telugu	
1977	Jeevithame Oka Natakam		Telugu	
1977	Oke Raktham		Telugu	
1977	Idekaddi Nyayam		Telugu	
1977	Geetha Sangeetha		Telugu	
1977	Athavarillu		Telugu	
1977	Rowdy Rajamma		Malayalam	
1977	Madhuraswapnam		Malayalam	
1977	Penn Jenmam		Tamil	
1978	Jaganmohini		Telugu	
1978	Dongala Dopidi	Radha	Telugu	
1978	Seetapathi Samsaram	Janaki	Telugu	
1978	Manchi Manasu		Telugu	
1978	Thalle Challani Daivam		Telugu	
1978	Swarga Seema		Telugu	
1978	Ramudu Rangadu		Telugu	
1978	Jaganmohini		Tamil	
1978	Tripura Sundari		Tamil	
1979	Intinti Ramayanam		Telugu	
1979	Maa Voori Devatha	Haritha	Telugu	
1979	Korikale Gurralaite		Telugu	
1979	Gandharva Kanya	Madhavi	Telugu	
1979	Maro Seetha Katha		Telugu	
1979	Manavoori Maruthi		Telugu	
1979	Peddillu Chinnillu		Telugu	
1979	Illali Muchatlu		Telugu	
1979	Aadadante Alusa		Telugu	
1979	Gandharva Kanni		Tamil	
1979	Nee Sirithal Naan Sirippen		Tamil	
1979	Hridhayathinte Nirangal		Malayalam	
1979	Pennorumbettaal		Malayalam	
1980	Samsara Bandam		Telugu	
1980	Konte Mogudu Penki Pellam	Geetha	Telugu	
1980	Shri Vinayaka Vijayamu	Priyamvada	Telugu	
1980	Snehamera Jeevitham		Telugu	
1980	Dharmam Daari Thappithe		Telugu	
1980	Natchathiram		Tamil	
1980	Thirayum Theeravum	Usha	Malayalam	
1980	Manushya Mrugam		Malayalam	
1981	Sandhya Raagam		Telugu	
1981	Parvati Parameshwarulu	Sunitha	Telugu	
1981	Nenu Maa Aavida		Telugu	
1981	Hamsa Geetham		Malayalam	
1982	Illantha Sandadi		Telugu	
1982	Manishiko Charithra		Telugu	
1982	Pagabattina Simham		Telugu	
1982	Pellilla Perayya		Telugu	
1982	Radhamma Mogudu		Telugu	
1982	Maattuvin Chattangale	Rajani	Malayalam	
1983	Santoshi Mata Vrata Mahatyam		Telugu	
1983	Simham Navvindi	Swapna	Telugu	
1983	Akka Mogudu Chelleli Kapuram		Telugu	
1983	Manege Banda Mahalakshmi		Kannada	
1983	Nammoora Basvi		Kannada	
1983	Gandugali Rama		Kannada	
1984	Padmavyuham		Telugu	
1984	Rojulu Marayi		Telugu	
1984	Railu Dopidi	Geetha	Telugu	
1984	Manishiko Charithra		Telugu	
1984	Padmavyooham		Telugu	
1984	Srimadvirat Veerabrahmendra Swami Charitra		Telugu	
1984	Alakadalinakkare	Amina	Malayalam	
1985	Shri Datta Darshanam	Sumathi	Telugu	
1985	Bhale Thammudu		Telugu	
1985	Prachanda Bhairavi	Annapurna	Telugu	
1985	Tandra Paparayudu		Telugu	
1985	Mayavi		Tamil	
1985	Oru Naal Innoru Naal		Malayalam	
1986	Tandra Paparayudu		Telugu	
1986	Aayiram Kannudayaal		Tamil	
1986	Agniyaanu Njaan Agni		Malayalam	
1987	Aatma Bandhuvulu		Telugu	
1987	Dammit Addam Katha Thirigindi		Telugu	
1988	Mugguru Kodukulu		Telugu	
1988	Brahma Puthrudu		Telugu	
1993	Chitikela Pandiri		Telugu	
1995	Maya Bazaar		Telugu	
1995	Kondapalli Rathaiah		Telugu	
2000	Chala Bagundi		Telugu	
2003	Raghavendra	Raghava's mother	Telugu	
2003	Kabirdas		Telugu	
2004	Vegu Chukkalu		Telugu	
2007	Lakshmi Kalyanam		Telugu	
2009	Kick		Telugu	
2009	Naadodigal	Sangvi Pathak	Tamil	
2010	Nagavalli	Parvathi Devi	Telugu	
2011	Avan Ivan	Kumbudren Saamy's mother	Tamil	
2011	Kondaan Koduthaan		Tamil	
2012	Uu Kodathara? Ulikki Padathara?	Rishi Kumar's mother	Telugu	
2012	Rebel		Telugu	
2013	Kutti Puli	Chellamma	Tamil	
2015	James Bond	Vasundara	Telugu	
2015	Rudhramadevi		Telugu	
2015	Bengal Tiger		Telugu	
2019	NTR: Kathanayakudu		Telugu	
2019	Kakatheeyudu		Telugu	
2019	Prati Roju Pandage		Telugu	

== TV Series ==
- Anandham (2007-2009, Tamil) as Charulatha/Muthulakshmi
- Kalasi Unte Kaladu Sukham (2021-2024, Telugu) as Geetha

== Awards ==
Nandi Awards

- Best Supporting Actress - Dharma Vaddi (1981)
- Special Jury Award - Vegu Chukkalu (2003)
