= Mera Pati Sirf Mera Hai =

1990 Indian film by M. M. Manobala

- Theatrical release poster
- Directed by: M. M. Manobala
- Written by: Dr. Achala Nagar (dialogues)
- Screenplay by: Dasari Narayana Rao
- Story by: P. Kalaimani
- Based on: En Purushanthaan Enakku Mattumthaan (1989) by Manobala
- Produced by: Nitin Kapoor
- Starring: Jeetendra; Rekha; Radhika
- Cinematography: M. V. Raghu
- Edited by: B.Krishnam Raju
- Music by: Anand–Milind
- Production company: JSK Combines
- Release date: 20 July 1990
- Running time: 142 minutes
- Country: India
- Language: Hindi

Mera Pati Sirf Mera Hai (transl. My Husband is only mine) is a 1990 Indian Hindi-language drama film, produced by Nitin Kapoor and directed by M. M. Manobala. The film stars Jeetendra, Rekha and Radhika, with music composed by Anand–Milind. It is a remake of Manobala's Tamil film En Purushanthaan Enakku Mattumthaan (1989).

== Plot ==
Prakash Chandra is the proprietor of a textile showroom. He is distressed by his virago wife, Roopa, who fails to respect her husband and is hard-hearted towards his daughter, Pinky. However, Prakash tolerates her for the happiness of his sister Jyoti, as Roopa is the sister of Jyoti’s husband, Deepak. Meanwhile, Prakash is surprised to see Sharda, a bank officer, as his neighbour and recalls the past. Prakash was once a platform tailor, but after Sharda’s arrival, his life takes a dramatic turn, and he becomes a famous designer with her encouragement and support. In time, they silently fall in love with each other. During this period, Prakash discovers that Jyoti is pregnant by Deepak, who agrees to marry her provided that Prakash marries Roopa, which he does. Upon learning this, Roopa spreads rumours about Sharda. As a result, Sharda is humiliated. Consequently, Sharda decides to teach Roopa a lesson, moves into their house, and begins teasing her alongside Prakash. Annoyed, Roopa elopes with the roguish Gulshan, a man who bears a grudge against Sharda, and abducts Pinky. She then frames Sharda, but Advocate Shankar Dayal Sharma, Sharda’s elder brother, proves that Roopa is the culprit. Moreover, Gulshan betrays her, and Prakash rescues Pinky. By the time Roopa realises her mistake, Prakash is about to marry Sharda. She immediately rushes to them, repents, and begs for forgiveness. In the end, Sharda reveals that her actions were merely an act and moves on. Finally, the film ends on a happy note with the reunion of Prakash and Roopa.

== Cast ==
- Jeetendra as Prakash Chandra
- Rekha as Sharda Sharma
- Radhika as Roopa Chandra
- Anupam Kher as Advocate Shankar Dayal Sharma
- Utpal Dutt as Manoharlal Verma
- Shubha Khote as Putlibai Verma
- Seema Deo as Mrs. Chandra
- Mahavir Shah as Prakash Verma
- Gulshan Grover as Gulshan
- Satish Shah as Daya Bhai
- Pradeep Rawat as Gangaram
- Yunus Parvez as Public Prosecutor
- Guddi Maruti as Guddi
- Vikas Anand as Police Inspector
- Chandrashekhar as Sharda's Prospective Father-In-Law
- Brijendra Kala as Milkman

== Soundtrack ==
The music was composed by Anand–Milind.

Song	Singer
"Maine Tujhe Khat Likha O Sajna"	S. P. Balasubrahmanyam, Lata Mangeshkar
"Thandi Hawa Hai Parda Gira Do"	Shailendra Singh, Sapna Mukherjee
"Aaiye Farmaiye"	Amit Kumar
"Aao Ji Aao"	Amit Kumar
