= Nallavanukku Nallavan =

1984 film by S. P. Muthuraman

- Theatrical release poster
- Directed by: S. P. Muthuraman
- Screenplay by: Visu
- Based on: Dharmaatmudu (Telugu)
- Produced by: M. Saravanan; M. Balasubramanian
- Starring: Rajinikanth; Radhika
- Cinematography: Babu
- Edited by: R. Vittal
- Music by: Ilaiyaraaja
- Production company: AVM Productions
- Release date: 22 October 1984
- Running time: 175 minutes
- Country: India
- Language: Tamil

Nallavanukku Nallavan (transl. Goodman to the good) is a 1984 Indian Tamil-language action drama film, directed by S. P. Muthuraman and produced by AVM Productions. A remake of the 1983 Telugu film Dharmaatmudu, it stars Rajinikanth and Radhika in the lead roles, with Karthik, Thulasi, V. K. Ramasamy, Major Sundarrajan, Y. G. Mahendran and Visu in supporting roles. The film revolves around a worker who is bequeathed his late boss's business, earning the wrath of the boss's son who believes he swindled his father's business.

The screenplay was written by Visu, who made minor changes to differentiate it from the Telugu original, which co-producer M. Saravanan noticed was very similar to the unsuccessful Tamil film Hitler Umanath (1982). The music of the film was composed by Ilaiyaraaja, cinematography was handled by Babu, and editing by R. Vittal.

Nallavanukku Nallavan was released on 22 October 1984, Diwali day and became a major commercial success, running for over 150 days in theatres across Tamil Nadu. For his performance, Rajinikanth won numerous awards, including the Filmfare Award for Best Actor – Tamil.

== Plot ==
Manickam is a well-meaning rogue. Uma, an orphaned woman, enters his house for safety from criminals who were chasing her. After he saves her from other criminals, he learns that she is a missing woman and drops her at her house. But upon seeing the abusive nature of her uncle Sadhasivam, he saves her and they marry. Manickam promises Uma he will not engage in violence, and surrenders to police inspector Azhagarsamy for his earlier acts.

Manickam is released from prison in time to see his newborn daughter Priya. Gangadharan, a friend of Azhagarsamy, gives Manickam employment at his factory, Victory Industries. When Gangadharan becomes bankrupt, he plans to close Victory Industries as he is unable to repay his debts to money lenders. Manickam persuades him to give him a chance to revive it and with hard efforts he repays all debts. As a token of gratitude, Gangadharan gives all his wealth to Manickam before dying.

Several years later, Manickam has been running Victory Industries to everyone's satisfaction. He also controls the financial affairs of Gangadharan's family. But Gangadharan's spoilt son Vinod dislikes Manickam, believing he swindled his father's business. Vinod tries to avenge Manickam by luring Priya. He brainwashes and marries her, much to the agony of Manickam and Uma, and Priya becomes estranged from them. Uma later dies of cardiac arrest. Manickam donates all his wealth and properties to Vinod, and tells him that he did not swindle his father's business.

Sadhasivam later tries to kill Vinod so that he can usurp his wealth. Priya informs Manickam of this, so he arrives and defeats Sadhasivam's thugs, saving Vinod in the process, while his friend Thakkali ties up Sadhasivam to be taken by the police. Manickam makes amends with Vinod and Priya, and plans to return to his old house, but is dissuaded by Priya, who reveals she is pregnant with Vinod's child.

== Cast ==
- Rajinikanth as Manickam
- Radhika as Uma
- Karthik as Vinod
- Thulasi as Priya
- V. K. Ramasamy as Sadhasivam
- Major Sundarrajan as Azhagarsamy
- Y. G. Mahendran as Thakkali
- Visu as Gangadharan (special appearance)
- Jeeva as 'Veri Naai' Vengaiya
- I.S.R as a police constable
- Master Suresh as Gangadharan's son
- Y. Vijaya as Gangadharan's wife
- Baby Kalpana as young Priya
- Kalpana Iyer (special appearance in the song "Vechukkava")

== Production ==
=== Development ===
After watching the Telugu film Dharmaatmudu (1983), director A. C. Tirulokchandar told M. Saravanan of AVM Productions about his desire to remake it in Tamil; he wanted Rajinikanth to play the male lead. Producer K. Balaji had earlier attempted a remake with Sivaji Ganesan, but dropped the project after feeling it was not suitable for Ganesan. Saravanan and others saw Dharmaatmudu, and noticed how similar it was to the Tamil film Hitler Umanath (1982). Screenwriter Panchu Arunachalam objected to remaking Dharmaatmudu since Hitler Umanath was unsuccessful, but Saravanan and director S. P. Muthuraman knew there was something responsible for Dharmaatmudu's success. They called Visu who, after watching the film, said it could be remade well with minor changes. He was soon finalised as the screenwriter for the remake which was titled Nallavanukku Nallavan. The film was directed by Muthuraman, produced by Saravanan and his brother M. Balasubramanian, with M. S. Guhan receiving an "associate producer" credit. Babu was hired for cinematography, and R. Vittal for editing.

=== Casting and filming ===
Rajinikanth was cast Manickam and Radhika as Uma. Radhika was cast after the producers were impressed with her performance in the Telugu film Bava Maradallu (1984). Muthuraman believed it would be innovative to see a heroic actor play a negative character, so he approached Karthik for the role of Vinod. He initially refused as he was not interested in portraying a negative character, but after Saravanan promised to cast him in a heroic role in a later film (which would become 1985's Nalla Thambi), he agreed. Visu, in addition to working as screenwriter, also appeared as Vinod's father Gangadharan.

The song "Vechukkava" was shot on a set resembling a five-star hotel with 200 television sets used. The song "Unnaithane" was intended to be shot at Kerala, but could not due to heavy rain there. Instead, it was shot at Muttukaadu due to its atmosphere resembling that of Kerala. One scene in the film involving a strike was based on a real incident which happened at TVS Motor Company. For another scene, picturised on Rajinikanth and Karthik and shot at AVM Studios, Babu lied on a bed-sheet spread over the floor to film it from a new angle.

The climax was initially very sentimental and, according to Saravanan, a poetic finish. While watching the double positive, (Note: Double positive is the stage when dubbing for a film has been completed, and picture and sound are on separate tracks—a raw copy where visual effects and background score remain to be added.) he was dissatisfied since Nallavanukku Nallavan was primarily an action film and felt a gentle climax would not be suitable. Both Rajinikanth and Muthuraman preferred the sentimental climax, but Saravanan remained adamant. The film was already cleared by the Censor Board with the sentimental climax, but it was decided to reshoot the film with an action-packed climax and submit that too to the Board, then decide which one to keep based on audience reactions; the audience preferred the action-packed climax. The climax fight scene was shot at Kallikottai, Kerala.

== Themes ==
S. Rajanayagam, author of Popular Cinema and Politics in South India: The Films of MGR and Rajinikanth, notes that Rajinikanth tries through his films to convey the message that he becomes a Tamilian by marital alliance, citing Nallavanukku Nallavan as an example. S. P. Muthuraman has stated that the film shows two polarising personalities of Manickam: the first half of the film has "commercial" elements and shows him as a dada (transl. gang leader); the second half shows him as a "rich man". Rajanayagam and film critic Naman Ramachandran note that the scene where Gangadharan asks Manickam if he has heard about a bus conductor who became a superstar through hard work, is a reference to Rajinikanth's early life as a bus conductor before he became an actor.

== Soundtrack ==
The soundtrack was composed by Ilaiyaraaja. The song "Unnaithane" was originally intended for a film to be directed by V. C. Guhanathan, but could not be used there. After obtaining a No Objection Certificate from Guhanathan, Saravanan was able to use the song in Nallavanukku Nallavan. It is set in Shivaranjani, a Carnatic raga, and marked playback singer Manjula Gururaj's debut in Tamil cinema. "Vechukkava" is set in the raga Sankarabharanam. It was remixed by Yuvan Shankar Raja in Silambattam (2008).

Track listing
No.	Title	Lyrics	Singer(s)	Length
1.	"Chittuku Chella Chittuku"	Na. Kamarasan	K. J. Yesudas	4:42
2.	"Unnaithane Thanjam Endru"	Vairamuthu	K. J. Yesudas, Manjula Gururaj	4:12
3.	"Vechukava"	Gangai Amaran	K. J. Yesudas, S. Janaki	4:30
4.	"Muthaduthey"	Muthulingam	S. P. Balasubrahmanyam, S. Janaki	4:35
5.	"Namma Mothalali"	Vaali	S. P. Balasubrahmanyam, Malaysia Vasudevan	4:25
6.	"Ennai Thane"	Vairamuthu	K. J. Yesudas	1:13
Total length:				23:37

== Release and reception ==
Nallavanukku Nallavan was released on 22 October 1984, Diwali day. Jayamanmadhan of Kalki praised the performances of the actors and Visu's writing. Balumani of Anna praised acting, music, cinematography, dialogues and direction. On 26 October 1984, The Hindu in its review wrote, "Muthuraman has a large hand in embellishing the dramatic elements with deft touches and polished handling". Despite facing competition from other Diwali releases such as Vaidehi Kathirunthal and the Tamil-dubbed version of the Malayalam-language My Dear Kuttichathan, the film was a major commercial success, running for over 150 days in theatres. According to a 2014 estimate by Sunita Raghu of The New Indian Express, it grossed ₹23.8 million (equivalent to ₹370 million or US$3.9 million in 2023).

== Accolades ==
Event	Category	Recipient	Ref.
Filmfare Awards South	Best Actor – Tamil	Rajinikanth	
Cinema Express Awards	Best Actor – Tamil	Rajinikanth	
Film Fans Association Awards	Best Actor	Rajinikanth	

== Bibliography ==
- Rajanayagam, S. (2015). Popular Cinema and Politics in South India: The Films of MGR and Rajinikanth. Routledge. ISBN 978-1-138-82203-0.
- Ramachandran, Naman, ed. (2012). Rajinikanth 12.12.12: A Birthday Special. Kasturi & Sons Ltd.
- Ramachandran, Naman (2014) [2012]. Rajinikanth: The Definitive Biography. New Delhi: Penguin Books. ISBN 978-0-14-342111-5.
- Saravanan, M. (2013) [2005]. AVM 60 Cinema (in Tamil) (3rd ed.). Rajarajan Pathippagam. OCLC 1158347612.
- Sundararaman (2007) [2005]. Raga Chintamani: A Guide to Carnatic Ragas Through Tamil Film Music (2nd ed.). Pichhamal Chintamani. OCLC 295034757.
