= Aame Katha =

1977 Indian Telugu-language film

- Theatrical release poster
- Directed by: K. Raghavendra Rao
- Produced by: Kranthi Kumar
- Starring: Murali Mohan; Jayasudha; Rajinikanth; Prabha; Sripriya
- Music by: K. Chakravarthy
- Release date: 18 November 1977
- Country: India
- Language: Telugu

Aame Katha (transl. Her story) is a 1977 Telugu drama film directed by K. Raghavendra Rao, starring Murali Mohan and Jayasudha in the title role. It also featured Rajinikanth in a guest role. Jayasudha won Filmfare Award for Best Actress - Telugu for her performance in the film.

== Cast ==
- Murali Mohan
- Jayasudha
- Rajinikanth
- Prabha
- Sripriya

== Soundtrack ==
No.	Title	Singer(s)	Length (m:ss)
1	"Pathi Ye Pratyksha Divame"	S.P. Balasubrahmanyam, B. Vasantha, L. R. Anjali	03:17
2	"Puvvula Nadudu Navvula Nadugu"	G. Anand, P. Susheela	03:16
3	"Taha Taha Mani"	S.P. Balasubrahmanyam, P. Susheela	03:35
4	"Yendayya Idi"	S. Janaki	02:59

== Awards ==
- Filmfare Award for Best Actress - Telugu - Jayasudha - won

== Legacy ==
Jayasudha considers Aame Katha along with Jyothi and Premalekhalu as the film that "made her a star."
