= Radha My Darling =

- Theatrical release poster
- Directed by: Bairisetty Bhaskara Rao
- Starring: Chiranjeevi
- Cinematography: V.S.R. Krishna Rao
- Music by: B. Shankar Rao
- Release date: 30 July 1982
- Country: India
- Language: Telugu

Radha My Darling is a Telugu film starring Chiranjeevi.

== Cast ==
- Chiranjeevi
- Vijayakala
- Rallapalli
- Pulipali Doraswamy Naidu
- Naramalli Sivaprasad
- Ranjan Babu
- P. L. Narayana
- Malladi
- Master Vimal Raj
- P. R. Varalakshmi
- Pandari Bai
- Tamoto Lakshmi
- Jayasheela

== Soundtrack ==
No.	Title	Lyrics	Singer(s)	Length
1.	"Dhiviloni Manideepama"	Jaladhi	S.P. Balasubrahmanyam
2.	"Yetiki Potosthe"	Jaladhi	S.P. Balasubrahmanyam, Chorus
3.	"Podiche Sureedu Ponapoovu Chaya"	C. Narayana Reddy	Vani Jairam
4.	"Maradhalu Pilla"	C. Narayana Reddy	Vani Jairam
5.	"Andharilo Iddaramunte"	C. Narayana Reddy	G. Anand, P. Latha Rani
