= Nandi Award for Best Character Actress =

Indian film award

This is the list of recipients of the Nandi Award for Best Character Actress since 1994, when the award for this category was instituted.

== Winners ==
Year	Actress	Film
2002	Bhanupriya	Lahiri Lahiri Lahirilo
2001	Lakshmi	Murari
2000	Jayasudha	Yuvakudu
1999	Nirmalamma	Seetharama Raju
1998	Shakuntala	Swarnakka
1997	Sujatha	Pelli
1996	Annapoorna	Maa Inti Aadapaduchu
1995	Siva Parvathi	Orey Rikshaw
1994	Jayasudha	Jailor Gaari Abbayi
