= Jailor Gaari Abbayi =

- Theatrical release poster
- Directed by: Sarath
- Written by: Paruchuri brothers
- Produced by: Venkata Raj Gopal
- Starring: Krishnam Raju; Jayasudha; Jagapathi Babu; Ramya Krishna
- Cinematography: N. Sudhakar Reddy
- Edited by: Kotagiri Venkateswara Rao
- Music by: Raj–Koti
- Production company: Sri Supraja Productions
- Release date: 14 May 1994
- Running time: 126 minutes
- Country: India
- Language: Telugu

Jailor Gaari Abbayi (transl. Jailor's Son) is a 1994 Indian Telugu-language action drama film written by the Paruchuri brothers and directed by Sarath. It stars Krishnam Raju, Jayasudha, Jagapathi Babu and Ramya Krishna, with music composed by Raj–Koti. The film was a hit at the box office. The film won two Nandi Awards.

== Cast ==
- Krishnam Raju as Jailor Chakrapani
- Jayasudha as Savitri
- Jagapathi Babu as Rajaram
- Ramya Krishna as Vyjayanti
- Harish as Rambabu
- Chandra Mohan as C.I. Chandra Shekhar
- Captain Raju as Bapineedu
- Srihari as Vicky
- Gokina Rama Rao as Ankineedu
- Murali Mohan as Dr. K. K. Rao
- Giri Babu as Deputy Jailor Gantaiah
- Babu Mohan as Peekaleru Papa Rao
- Ali as Constable Yadagiri
- Chalapathi Rao as Ganapati
- Rajanala as Lawyer
- Prasad Babu as DSP
- Brahmaji as Venkatappaiah / Babji
- Vidya Sagar as Lawyer
- Jayabhaskar as Gandhi Raju
- Bheemeswara Rao as Judge
- Dham as a prisoner
- Vijaya Lalitha as Kanaka Durga
- Srikanya as Jyothi
- Siva Parvati as Kasturi
- Rajitha as Lalita
- Kalpana Rai as Hostel Warden
- Baby Nikhita as Bujji

== Soundtrack ==
Jailor Gaari Abbayi

Film score by Raj–Koti
- Released: 1994
- Genre: Soundtrack
- Length: 22:36
- Label: Supreme Music
- Producer: Raj–Koti

Raj–Koti chronology
Bangaru Kutumbam (1994)	Jailor Gaari Abbayi (1994)	Bhale Bullodu (1995)

Music composed by Raj–Koti. Lyrics were written by Veturi. Music released on Supreme Music Company.

No.	Title	Singer(s)	Length
1.	"Abbaarey Yebba"	S. P. Balasubrahmanyam, Chitra	4:56
2.	"Alludo Ammayi Natha"	S. P. Balasubrahmanyam, Chitra	4:26
3.	"Andame Adbhutam"	S. P. Balasubrahmanyam, Chitra	4:19
4.	"Priyatamaa Priyaatamaa"	S. P. Balasubrahmanyam, Chitra	4:29
5.	"Gaajula Gala Gala"	Malgudi Subha, Radhika	4:26
Total length:			22:36

== Awards ==
Nandi Awards -1994

- Best Character Actor - Krishnam Raju
- Best Character Actress - Jayasudha
