= Tripurasundari (film) =

- Directed by: Vijaya Ganesh
- Written by: Vijaya Ganesh
- Produced by: N. R. Amudha
- Starring: Srikanth; Prabha
- Cinematography: D. Rajagopal
- Edited by: N. M. Shankar
- Music by: Ilaiyaraaja
- Production company: Garuda Films
- Release date: 5 May 1978
- Country: India
- Language: Tamil

Tripurasundari is a 1978 Indian Tamil-language film written and directed by Vijaya Ganesh. The film stars Srikanth and Prabha. It revolves around a college girl who seeks revenge on three boys from her college for molesting her. The film was released on 5 May 1978.

== Plot ==
A college girl from an oppressed caste is in love with her uncle. She is kidnapped and molested by three boys from the same college as her. They even set fire to the hut she was living in. The girl seeks revenge.

== Cast ==
- Srikanth as the college girl's uncle
- Prabha as the college girl
- Baladasan
- V. Gopalakrishnan
- Jayachandran as a college boy
- Oru Viral Krishna Rao as a college lecturer
- Nagesh as the doctor
- Sarath Babu as a college boy
- Rajasekaran as a college boy
- Suruli Rajan
- Manorama as a college lecturer
- Sachu
- Meera
- S. N. Lakshmi

== Soundtrack ==
The music was scored by Ilaiyaraaja. The song "Vaanathu Poongili" marked the Tamil debut of singer Jency.

Track listing
No.	Title	Lyrics	Singer(s)	Length
1.	"En Kangal"	Kannadasan	S. Janaki
2.	"Vaanathu Poongili"	Kannadasan	S. Janaki, Jency
3.	"Kattazhagu Mama"	Pulamaipithan	S. Janaki
4.	"Odam Ondru"	Pulamaipithan	Ilaiyaraaja

== Reception ==
A critic from Free India gave the film a positive review for the performances of Prabha, Srikanth, Nagesh and Gopalakrishnan.
