= Nandi Award for Best Actress =

Annual Indian film award

- Awarded for: Best Performance by an actress in a leading role in Telugu cinema
- Sponsored by: Government of Andhra Pradesh
- Rewards: 6" Silver Nandi; Smt. Jamuna Gold Medal; ₹30,000 (US$320)
- First award: 1977
- Final award: 2016
- Most recent winner: Ritu Varma for film Pelli Choopulu

Highlights
- Most wins: Vijayashanti (4 awards); Jayasudha (4 awards)
- Total awarded: 40
- First winner: Lakshmi

The Nandi Award for Best Actress was commissioned in 1977. The recipient is given a "Silver Nandi" and a ₹30,000 cash award.

== Superlatives ==
The actresses with most wins are listed in order

Wins	Actress
4	Vijayashanti, Jayasudha
2	Laya, Aamani, Lakshmi

== List of winners of Nandi Awards for Best Actress ==
Year	Actress	Role	Film
2016	Ritu Varma	Chitra	Pelli Choopulu
2015	Anushka Shetty	Soundarya 'Sweety'	Size Zero
2014	Anjali	Geetanjali/Ushanjali	Geethanjali
2013	Anjali Patil	Durga	Naa Bangaaru Talli
2012	Samantha	Nithya Yalavarthi	Yeto Vellipoyindhi Manasu
2011	Nayanthara	Goddess Sita	Sri Rama Rajyam
2010	Nithya Menen	Nithya	Ala Modalaindi
2009	Theertha	Malli	Sontha Ooru
2008	Swathi Reddy	Lavanya	Ashta Chamma
2007	Charmy Kaur	Mantra	Mantra
2006	Nandita Das	Kamli	Kamli
2005	Trisha	Siri	Nuvvostanante Nenoddantana
2004	Kamalinee Mukherjee	Roopa	Anand
2003	Bhumika Chawla	Meghana	Missamma
2002	Kalyani	Swathi	Avunu Valliddaru Ista Paddaru
2001	Laya	Meena	Preminchu
2000	Laya	Usha	Manoharam
1999	Maheswari	Sasirekha	Nee Kosam
1998	Roja	Bhanumati	Swarnakka
1997	Vijayashanti	Ramulamma	Osey Ramulamma
1996	Soundarya	Radha	Pavithra Bandham
1995	Aamani	Ganga	Subha Sankalpam
1994	Ooha	Bhavani	Aame
1993	Aamani	Jhansi / Goddess Lakshmi	Mr. Pellam
1992	Meena	Rajeshwari	Rajeswari Kalyanam
1991	Sridevi	Satya	Kshana Kshanam
1990	Vijayashanti	Vyjayanthi	Karthavyam
1989	Vijayashanti	Bharathi	Bharatha Naari
1988	Bhanupriya	Meenakshi	Swarna Kamalam
1987	Sumalatha	Sita	Sruthilayalu
1986	Lakshmi	Shanthi	Sravana Meghalu
1985	Vijayashanti	Jhansi	Pratighatana
1984	Suhasini	Swathi	Swathi
1983	Jayasudha	Lakshmi	Dharmaatmudu
1982	Jaya Prada	Padma	Meghasandesam
1981	Jayasudha	Jayanthi	Premabhishekam
1980	Sakuntala		Kukka
1979	Jayasudha	Suhasini	Idi Katha Kaadu
1978	Roopa	Kalyani	Naalaaga Endaro
1977	Lakshmi	Sharada	Pantulamma

== See also ==
- Nandi Awards
