= Avargal =

1977 film by K. Balachander

- Poster
- Directed by: K. Balachander
- Written by: K. Balachander
- Produced by: P. R. Govindarajan; J. Duraisamy
- Starring: Sujatha; Kamal Haasan; Rajinikanth; Ravikumar
- Cinematography: B. S. Lokanath
- Edited by: N. R. Kittu
- Music by: M. S. Viswanathan
- Production company: Kalakendra Movies
- Release date: 25 February 1977
- Running time: 167 minutes
- Country: India
- Language: Tamil

Avargal (pronounced [aʋaɾɡaɭ] transl. They) is a 1977 Indian Tamil-language romantic drama film written and directed by K. Balachander. The film stars Sujatha, Kamal Haasan, Rajinikanth and Ravikumar. A triangular love story, it revolves around a woman who is caught between the man she fell in love with and her former sadistic husband who is supposedly reformed and wants to get back together with her.

Avargal was released on 25 February 1977. Although the film was a commercial failure, Sujatha won the Filmfare Award for Best Actress – Tamil, and the film qualified for the Indian Panorama. Balachander later remade the film in Telugu as Idi Katha Kaadu (1979), with Haasan reprising his role.

== Plot ==
Anu is a dancer in love with Bharani, a flautist. After her father is transferred to Bombay, she slowly loses touch with Bharani, who does not respond to her letters. When her father falls ill, his colleague Ramanathan supports them. When Ramanathan offers to marry Anu, she is in a fix. She seeks time to decide and writes one last letter to Bharani, and upon receiving no reply, she marries Ramanathan. Soon after, her father dies.

After marriage, Ramanathan reveals his true personality; chauvinistic, sadistic, and possessive. Not wanting to be identified as a dancer's husband, he forces her to give up dancing. Ramanathan suspects Anu's character and expresses doubts regarding the paternity of their newborn son. Unable to take further abuse, and also for the well-being of her son, she divorces Ramanathan, refuses alimony, and returns to Madras to start a new independent life.

In Madras, Anu gets supportive friends at her office, particularly a widower named Janardhan "Johnny," who frequently "talks" through his puppet, Junior. As Anu struggles to find a house, he offers his own flat and moves to his outhouse. Despite loving Anu, he lacks the courage to tell her. Bharani, Johnny's neighbour, visits and is surprised to see Anu. She learns that none of her letters have reached Bharani, since they were intercepted by his mentally-ill sister. Bharani saw the letters only after his sister died. By then, it was too late, as Anu had already married Ramanathan. Heartbroken, Bharani remained single.

Ramanathan's estranged mother, Leelavathi, realises Anu is her daughter-in-law. She regrets her son's behaviour; exploiting her anonymity, she obtains work as Anu's maid. Anu renews her relationship with Bharani. Leelavathi also supports Anu's decisions and advises her to move ahead in life. They decide to marry and a date is fixed for a civil wedding.

Ramanathan comes to Madras as Anu's boss, seemingly repentant and wanting to redress his wrongs. He does not reveal that he is Anu's ex-husband to Bharani, who reveals his plans to marry Anu. Johnny learns about Anu and Bharani's love; though disappointed, he continues to support Anu. Leelavathi convinces Anu to discard her mangala sutra and marry Bharani. However, on the scheduled day, Anu falls ill and does not turn up at the marriage registrar's office. Bharani comes to her house, where he is disappointed to see Ramanathan taking care of Anu. Three men — Ramanathan, Bharani and Johnny — vy for her.

Ramanathan seeks forgiveness and expresses his desire to re-marry Anu. When Anu's colleague Rajathi, who knows Leelavathi, visits Anu, she is stunned to see Leelavathi employed as her maid. Despite Leelavathi's earlier pleas not to reveal her identity, Rajathi does so out of frustration. Shocked, Anu seeks Leelavathi's forgiveness. She goes to meet Johnny to seek his advice. Johnny finally courageously reveals his love for Anu through Junior. Anu expresses her inability to accept his love, but seeks his continued support as a friend. Noticing Anu's predicament and Ramanathan's continued involvement in her life, Bharani decides to move away from her and goes abroad for his musical programmes.

Ramanathan's reformed behaviour and Leelavathi's sacrifices make Anu agree to become Ramanathan's wife once again. When she reaches his home, Leelavathi reveals that Ramanathan has not really changed; he had staged this drama to stop her marriage to Bharani. When another woman shows up with her child claiming to be Ramanathan's wife, Anu realises Ramanathan's hidden agenda. Anu rushes to meet Bharani, but is too late by then, as Ramanathan has convinced Bharani to marry his rich fan Gayathri, and the engagement takes place.

Anu confronts Ramanathan; he reveals that he could not tolerate his ex-wife living happily; hence, he ensured that all her dreams were shattered. Anu quits her job and plans to leave Madras. Johnny makes all arrangements for her travel to Trivandrum, her destination. When the train leaves, Anu is shocked to see Leelavathi also on board. Leelavathi says this is the only way she can find solace for the sins of her son. Anu and Leelavathi embrace.

== Cast ==
- Sujatha as Anu
- Kamal Haasan as Janardhan (Johnny)
- Rajinikanth as Ramanathan
- Ravikumar as Bharani
- Leelavathi as Leelavathi
- Kumari Padmini as Rajathi
- Kutty Padmini as Gayathri

== Production ==
Kamal Haasan learnt the art of ventriloquism to portray his character perfectly. Both Haasan and Raghuram worked as choreographers for the film. The song "Junior Junior" was picturised on Haasan's character using a puppet named Junior. While not shooting his scenes, Rajinikanth would watch Haasan acting and learn from it to improve his own acting.

== Soundtrack ==
The soundtrack was composed by M. S. Viswanathan and lyrics were written by Kannadasan. Viswanathan composed the song "Angum Ingum" within 15 minutes. The song is set in the Carnatic raga known as Sankarabharanam, while "Kaatrukkenna Veli" is set in Bala Nandhini. Songs like "Kaatrukkenna Veli", "Junior" and "Angum Ingum" attained popularity.

Song	Singers	Length
"Angum Ingum"	S. P. Balasubrahmanyam	3:31
"Gangaiyile Neer"	S. Janaki	1:53
"Ippadiyor Thalattu"	S. Janaki	4:14
"Junior Junior"	S. P. Balasubrahmanyam, Sadan	6:01
"Kaatrukkenna Veli"	S. Janaki	4:15

== Release and reception ==
Avargal was released on 25 February 1977. The magazine Ananda Vikatan, in a review dated 13 March 1977, appreciated the film, mentioned that it was a different attempt, and that though the film was narrated with many flashbacks, with Balachander's touches they were not a burden to follow. Kanthan of Kalki appreciated the cast performances, particularly Sujatha's, but felt Ravikumar could have been more polished. He also appreciated Balachander's writing and direction. Although the film was a commercial failure, Sujatha won the Filmfare Award for Best Actress – Tamil, and the film qualified for the Indian Panorama.

== Legacy ==
Avargal had a reputation of being one of the most sensitive films on women's lib, and is widely regarded as one of the finest that Balachander had directed. In 2014, Baradwaj Rangan while analysing the dominance of female characters in Balachander's films, included Avargal as one among them. Clips from Avargal were screened along with clips from other films such as Server Sundaram (1964), Iru Kodugal (1969), Arangetram (1973), Aval Oru Thodar Kathai (1974) and Azhagan (1991) at a function held in Balachander's honour at Tiruchirappalli in January 2015, a month after his death.

In 2007, Rediff.com wrote, "Avargal was considered a progressive and radical film by the seventies' standard. Rajnikanth gave a classic performance projecting a combination of two contrasting facets of villainy – both openly sadistic and wily. He actually outdid himself as the wily scheming man". In 2011, after Balachander had been given the Dadasaheb Phalke Award, Rediff named it one of Balachander's best and wrote, "Avargal is yet another film that portrayed a strong female protagonist". Writing for The Hindu in 2011, S. Shiva Kumar said, "I emerged highly impressed. The characterisation was fascinating and the acting underplayed to perfection. There's the sadistic husband played to perfection by Rajnikant, the wife who walks out portrayed by Sujatha whose eloquent eyes mirrored pain even when she smiled and Kamal who mesmerised as a Malayali ventriloquist, silently admires Sujatha". Malathi Rangarajan of The Hindu wrote, "Avargal is yet another film in which Sujatha scored a ton, despite the powerful presence of Rajinikanth, Kamal Haasan and Ravikumar" and also praised Rajni's performance as "one of his best till date".

== Bibliography ==
- Dhananjayan, G. (2014). Pride of Tamil Cinema: 1931–2013. Blue Ocean Publishers. OCLC 898765509.
- Rajadhyaksha, Ashish; Willemen, Paul (1998) [1994]. Encyclopaedia of Indian Cinema. British Film Institute and Oxford University Press. ISBN 0-19-563579-5.
- Ramachandran, Naman, ed. (2012). Rajinikanth 12.12.12: A Birthday Special. Kasturi & Sons Ltd.
- Ramachandran, Naman (2014) [2012]. Rajinikanth: The Definitive Biography. New Delhi: Penguin Books. ISBN 978-0-14-342111-5.
- Sundararaman (2007) [2005]. Raga Chintamani: A Guide to Carnatic Ragas Through Tamil Film Music (2nd ed.). Chennai: Pichhamal Chintamani. OCLC 295034757.
