= Penn Jenmam =

- Theatrical release poster
- Directed by: A. C. Thirulokachandar
- Screenplay by: A. C. Thirulokachandar
- Dialogue by: Aaroor Dass
- Story by: Atchutavalli
- Produced by: A. C. Thirulokachandar
- Starring: R. Muthuraman; Prabha
- Cinematography: Viswanathan Roy
- Edited by: B. Kandasamy
- Music by: Ilaiyaraaja
- Production company: Cine Bharath
- Release date: 19 August 1977
- Running time: 146 minutes
- Country: India
- Language: Tamil

Penn Jenmam (transl. A woman's life) is a 1977 Indian Tamil-language film produced and directed by A. C. Thirulokachandar. The film stars R. Muthuraman and Prabha. It was released on 19 August 1977.

== Cast ==
Male cast

- R. Muthuraman
- Y. G. Mahendran
- Prem Anand
- Mohan
- Prakash
- Thengai Srinivasan
- S. A. Ashokan

Female cast

- Prabha
- Jayamalini
- Pushpa
- Manorama
- Seethalakshmi
- Mythili

== Soundtrack ==
The music was composed by Ilaiyaraaja, with lyrics by Vaali.

Track listing
No.	Title	Singer(s)	Length
1.	"Hoi Mama"	S. Janaki, S. P. Balasubrahmanyam
2.	"Kathakalakshebam"	P. Susheela
3.	"Chellapillai Saravanan"	P. Susheela, K. J. Yesudas
4.	"Oru Kovilil"	P. Susheela

== Release and reception ==
Penn Jenmam was released on 19 August 1977. Free India praised Thirulokachander's direction and the performances of the lead pair but criticised the music and concluded that "one needs a lot of patience to witness the film till the interval, for only after the recess the picture sustains interest". Naagai Dharuman of Anna lauded the performance of the cast, especially Prabha, the comedy of Manorama and Srinivasan, Ilaiyaraaja's music and Thirulokachander's direction.
