= Asthulu Anthasthulu =

- Theatrical release poster
- Directed by: Bairisetty Bhaskara Rao
- Written by: Acharya Aatreya (dialogues)
- Screenplay by: Bairisetty Bhaskara Rao
- Story by: Kalaimani
- Based on: Muthal Vasantham (1986)
- Produced by: Smt. Sunitha Reddy
- Starring: Rajendra Prasad; Chandra Mohan; Ramya Krishna
- Cinematography: M.Satti Babu
- Edited by: Atmacharan; Surendra Nath Reddy
- Music by: Ilayaraja
- Production company: Sunitha Enterprises
- Release date: 14 April 1988
- Running time: 134 minutes
- Country: India
- Language: Telugu

Asthulu Anthasthulu (transl. Property and Status) is a 1988 Indian Telugu-language masala film, produced by Smt. Sunitha Reddy on Sunitha Enterprises banner and directed by Bairisetty Bhaskara Rao. Starring Rajendra Prasad, Chandra Mohan and Ramya Krishna, with music composed by Ilaiyaraaja. The film is remake of Tamil film Muthal Vasantham (1986).

== Cast ==
- Rajendra Prasad as Kishtaiah
- Chandra Mohan as Sivaiah
- Ramya Krishna as Radha
- Kota Srinivasa Rao as Kota Tirupati Naidu
- Charan Raj as Pulikante Papa Rayudu
- Prabhakar Reddy as Gangulu
- Rallapalli as Kalahasthi
- Saradhi
- Mada
- KK Sarma as Wizard
- Bhemiswara Rao
- Mahalakshmi as Gowri
- Shubha as Annapurna
- Mamatha as Gangulu's wife

== Soundtrack ==
Music was composed by Ilaiyaraaja.

Song title	Lyrics	Singers	length
"Adenu Oka Puvvalle"	Veturi	S. Janaki	4:18
"Thulli Thulli"	Veturi	Mano, P. Susheela	4:06
"Kanne Vayasu"	Gopi	S. P. Balasubrahmanyam	4:40
"Alupuleni Keratalivi"	Rajasri	P. Susheela	5:00
"Midisipade Deepalivi"	Veturi	K. J. Yesudas	4:52
