= Hands Up (2000 film) =

- Poster
- Directed by: Siva Nageswara Rao
- Screenplay by: Siva Nageswara Rao
- Story by: Jayasudha
- Produced by: Nitin Kapoor
- Dialogue by: Janardhana Maharshi
- Starring: Jayasudha; Bramhanandam; Nagendra Babu
- Cinematography: K. Poorna
- Edited by: Gautham Raju
- Music by: Sashi Preetam
- Release date: 10 February 2000
- Country: India
- Language: Telugu

Hands Up is a 2000 Indian Telugu-language action comedy film directed by Siva Nageswara Rao from a story written by Jayasudha. It stars Jayasudha, Brahmanandam and Nagendra Babu with Chiranjeevi in a guest appearance. The film was produced by Jayasudha's husband Nitin Kapoor.

== Plot ==
A series of bomb blasts wreak havoc in Hyderabad, prompting the appointment of Saraswathi (Jayasudha), a CBI officer, to lead the investigation. This decision is met with resistance from the local CBI officer (Giri Babu), who seeks to derail the inquiry. To hinder her progress, he assigns her two incompetent assistants, Muddu Krishna (Nagendra Babu) and Jagan (Brahmanandam), both of whom are former CBI staff dismissed for their inefficiency. Their foolishness further complicates the investigation.

Muddu Krishna stumbles upon a suitcase containing crucial evidence about the bomb blasts and the involvement of the gang led by Ramakoti (Kota Srinivasa Rao). The suitcase also reveals a dispute between Ramakoti and Tugluq (Sonu Sood) over a share of the money from the blasts. As Saraswathi closes in on Ramakoti, he is killed by Tugluq. Despite this setback, Saraswathi continues her pursuit of the gang, and to mislead them, she announces that Ramakoti is alive and has turned approver. A press conference is arranged, where a lookalike of Ramakoti (using his corpse) is brought to court to testify.

As Tugluq attempts to eliminate Ramakoti during the court proceedings, he escapes once again. In a subsequent chase through a shopping arcade, Tugluq threatens to shoot a random shopper (Chiranjeevi). The plot culminates with a shocking revelation: the shopper is Saraswathi's husband, causing Jagan and Muddu Krishna to realize the true identity of the man they had been pursuing.

== Cast ==
- Jayasudha as CBI officer Saraswati
- Brahmanandam as Jagan
- Nagendra Babu as Muddu Krishna
- Kota Srinivasa Rao as Ramakoti
- Sonu Sood as Tuglaq
- Tanikella Bharani as Translator
- Rallapalli
- Chandra Mohan
- Giri Babu
- Y. Vijaya
- L. B. Sriram as V.I.P. Indian Traveling Goods worker
- Surya
- Master Varun

Cameo appearances

- Chiranjeevi as Saraswati's husband
- Nagma as an item number
- Deepti Bhatnagar
- Shraddha
- Ali
- Raghava Lawrence in a special appearance in the song "Jaana Jaana"

== Soundtrack ==
The music for the film was composed by Sashi Preetam.

No.	Title	Singer(s)	Length
1.	"Ayyayyo"	Chakri
2.	"Jaana Jaana"	Rajesh Krishnan, Sowmya Raoh
3.	"Killare Killa"	Anupama, Mano
4.	"Lahiri Lahiri"	K. S. Chithra, Sowmya Raoh
5.	"Lovvera"	Rajesh Krishnan, Sowmya Raoh
6.	"Mastu"
7.	"Tragedy"	Sasi Preetam, Chakri
8.	"CBI"

== Reception ==
Jeevi of Idlebrain.com rated the film 2 3/4 out of 5 and wrote, "The USP of this film is comedy. As the story is simple, this film would have worked well if it is taken an hour to narrate. By adding five songs to the wafer-thin story and dragging the story in the second half, the director made this film a little insipid".

Griddaluru Gopalrao of Zamin Ryot wrote, "Director Siva Nageswara Rao has used crime investigations, funeral processions, tea parties and conferences in the story to create humour. The film is full of humour and is full of fun (the audience's hearts are full of laughter".

Andhra Today reviewed the film as an unsuccessful attempt to blend a serious theme with humour, disappointing the audience due to its weak storyline and ineffective humour, despite a notable guest appearance by Chiranjeevi and Kota Srinivasa Rao's performance as a corpse.
