= Nitin Kapoor =

Indian film producer (1959–2017)

- Born: 27 November 1959
- Died: 14 March 2017 (aged 57)
- Spouse: Jayasudha
- Children: Nihar, Shreayan
- Relatives: Jeetendra

Nitin Kapoor was a producer in predominantly Telugu films. He was the husband of South Indian actress Jayasudha and a cousin of the Bollywood actor Jeetendra.

== Career ==
Nitin Kapoor was an assistant Director of the 1984 movie Asha Jyoti starring Rajesh Khanna and Reena Roy. He produced Kalikalam (1991) and Hands Up (2000) starring his wife Jayasudha and Mera Pati Sirf Mera Hai in 1990 starring his cousin Jeetendra and Rekha.

== Personal life ==
With Jayasudha, whom he married in 1985, he has two children. Nitin produced movies under the banner JSK Combines. He suffered from depression due to financial issues. Nitin committed suicide by jumping from a building on 14 March 2017. According to his wife, he suffered from bipolar disorder.

== Filmography ==
- Aadi Dampatulu (1986)
- Kanchana Sita (1987)
- Kalikalam (1990)
- Mera Pati Sirf Mera Hai (1990) (Hindi)
- Adrustam (1992)
- Vinta Kodallu (1993)
- Hands Up (2000)
