= Aaina (1974 film) =

- Poster
- Directed by: K. Balachander
- Written by: K. Balachander, Inder Raj Anand (dialogue)
- Produced by: L. Duraiswamy, N. Selvaraj
- Starring: Mumtaz
- Cinematography: B. S. Lokanath
- Edited by: N. R. Kittu
- Music by: Naushad
- Production company: Kalakendra Films
- Release date: 11 January 1974
- Running time: 150 minutes
- Country: India
- Language: Hindi

Aaina (transl. Mirror) is a 1974 Indian Hindi-language drama film written and directed by K. Balachander. A remake of the Tamil film Arangetram (1973), it stars Mumtaz in the lead role with A. K. Hangal, Nirupa Roy, Lalita Pawar, Jayasudha and Madan Puri in supporting roles. This film has a special appearance by Rajesh Khanna. The film is about a brahmin girl becoming a sex worker to support her large family.

== Plot ==
Ram Shashtri, an upper Caste Hindu Brahmin, lives in a small village in India. He has a large family, consisting of his wife, Savitri, five daughters and three sons. Ram supports them, earning meagre wages, by performing prayers and last rites for the Hindu community.

Ashok, (the son of the Village Mukhiya, Jagannath Rao), is in love with Shalini, the eldest Shashtri child, and wants to marry her. As the Raos are of a much lower caste than the Shastri's, Ashok is told by his father that he cannot marry Shalini. After an argument with his dad, he joins the army, and a few weeks later, a telegram is sent to Jagannath informing him that Ashok has been killed.

As Ram's work dwindles and he can no longer sustain his family, Savitri attempts to poison the entire family, but Shalini stops her in time. She gets a job and is able to support her family. Her brother, Gautam, wants to be a doctor, while her sister, Poorna, wants to be a singer. Her siblings' need for schooling causes Shalini to make the choice to leave her village for Poona.

Her brother's need for admission to medical school comes at the cost of her dignity and innocence. The family, though are left in the dark. Shalini gets a ‘raise’ and an offer for a bigger pay raise if she relocates to the capital, Delhi. She sends plenty of money so her dad no longer has to work, and her siblings can carry on with their respective studies.

It's in Delhi, when late one night when a knock on Shalini's door, who was expecting a client, leads to a shocking truth. Ashok, alone in a new city and wanting company, was told to go to an address where he could find a prostitute.

Both are shocked to see each other. Shalini makes no attempt to hide her trade and tells Ashok that this is the way she has been supporting her family. Ashok, still in love with Shalini, leaves heartbroken.

Meanwhile, Shalini's sister, Girja, meets a young man, Raju, and both fall in love. Now a doctor, Gautam is in love with the Tehsildar's daughter, Usha, and wants to marry her. Shalini returns home to attend Girja's marriage and recognises the groom. Before the wedding, the groom is nowhere to be found.

It's revealed when Shalini goes looking for and finds him that they both have a secret. He was a former client. They promise to keep their past relations a secret, as he loves Girja and still wants to marry her. Girja's marriage takes place with great pomp and ceremony and everyone compliments Shalini, for without her efforts, the family would have been destitute.

Gautam, who has done nothing except ask Shalini for handouts, tells her to arrange his marriage to Usha. Meanwhile, Ashok returns home to his father, who had been expecting him as Shalini had told him that Ashok was alive. During his return visit, Ram and Savitri arrive to invite them to the wedding. After they leave, Ashok tells his father about his discovery of Shalini's work. Although his father is shocked and relieved Ashok said nothing in front of her parents, unfortunately Ram and Savitri overhear them, causing Ram to fall unconscious.

Meanwhile, Ram's sister also finds out and due to her bitterness at her own daughter not receiving any marriage proposals tells the Tehsildar and the rest of Ram's family of Shalini's windfall job. The Tehsildar, Shalini's aunt and Gautam demean her, disown her, and throw her out of the house.

Despite all she has done for her family, it is only her mother who feels for her but is helpless to do anything. Left with nowhere to turn, Ashok and his father take her in. Shalini has an emotional meltdown and talks about committing suicide. The sound of the shehnai from her brother's wedding can be heard in the background.

Ram comes to invite Jagannath to the wedding and Jagannath and Ashok refuse, saying they support Shalini. Ashok accepts her for what she is and marries her with the blessings of his father.

== Cast ==
- Mumtaz – Shalini Shastri
- A. K. Hangal – Ram Shastri
- Nirupa Roy – Savitri
- Rita Bhaduri – Poorna
- Adil Amaan – Dr. Gautam
- Yasmin - Devi
- Jayasudha – Usha
- Lalitha Pawar – Janki
- Manmohan Krishna – Jagannath Rao
- Jagdishraj – Managing Director
- Polson
- Brahmachari
- Madan Puri – M. B. Patil
- Jagdeep – Music Instructor
- Suresh Chatwal – Shyam Lal
- Rajesh Khanna - Ashok Rao (Cameo)
- Kamal Haasan – Prem Kapoor (Cameo)
- Dharmendra – Cameo appearance
- Neetu Singh – Cameo appearance

== Production ==
Aaina is a remake of the Tamil film Arangetram, also directed by same director, starring Pramila, Kamal Haasan and Sivakumar. This was the first Hindi film where Kamal Haasan made an uncredited appearance and he also worked as an assistant choreographer for the film. This was Mumtaz's last film as a heroine before she got married. She later made a one-film comeback with Aandhiyan (1990).

== Music ==
Jan Nisar Akhtar wrote all the songs.

Aaina

Soundtrack album by Naushad
- Released: 1974
- Genre: Feature film soundtrack
- Language: Hindi
- Label: EMI

No.	Title	Singer(s)	Length
1.	"Dharti Hansti Re"	Lata Mangeshkar
2.	"Woh Jo Auron Ki Khatir""	Lata Mangeshkar
3.	"Jane Kya Ho Jaye, Jab Dil Se Dil Takraye"	Lata Mangeshkar, Mohammed Rafi
4.	"Kaho To Aaj Bol Doon"	Asha Bhosle
5.	"Teri Dulhan Badi Jaadugarni"	Vani Jairam
6.	"Dhyan Dhyan Ki"	Vani Jairam
7.	"Saregamapa"	Vani Jairam, Unknown
