= Kalikalam =

- Directed by: Muthyala Subbaiah
- Screenplay by: Muthyala Subbaiah
- Story by: Sri Raj
- Produced by: Nitin Kapoor
- Starring: Chandra Mohan; Jayasudha; Sai Kumar
- Cinematography: R. Rama Rao
- Edited by: Goutham Raju
- Music by: Vidyasagar
- Release date: 27 March 1991
- Running time: 121 minutes
- Country: India
- Language: Telugu

Kalikalam is a 1991 Indian Telugu-language drama film directed by Muthyala Subbaiah and starring Chandra Mohan and Jayasudha. The story revolves around the difficulties of a typical middle-class family, unable to earn money to lead a satisfied life. The film was remade in Kannada as Kumkuma Bhagya (1993), in Tamil with the same name (1992) and in Malayalam as Santhanagopalam (1994).

== Cast ==
- Chandra Mohan
- Jayasudha
- Sai Kumar
- Subhalekha Sudhakar
- Suthi Velu
- Narra Venkateswara Rao
- Rallapalli
- Brahmanandam
- Eswari Rao
- Satyanarayana

== Soundtrack ==
Kalikalam

Film score by Vidyasagar
- Released: 1991
- Genre: Soundtrack

Music was composed by Vidyasagar. Lyrics were written by Seetharama Sastry.

S.No	Song title	Singers
1	"Yenaatiki Nee Odi"	S. P. Balasubrahmanyam
2	"Yenatikanadu"	S. P. Balasubrahmanyam
3	"Achhacho Acho"	
4	"Aarani Akali Kalam"	S. P. Balasubrahmanyam
