= Yuvakudu =

- Directed by: A. Karunakaran
- Produced by: Nagarjuna; N. Sudhakar Reddy
- Starring: Sumanth; Bhumika Chawla; Jayasudha
- Cinematography: Balasubramaniem
- Edited by: Marthand K. Venkatesh
- Music by: Mani Sharma
- Production company: Great India Entertainments
- Release date: 18 May 2000
- Running time: 138 mins
- Country: India
- Language: Telugu

Yuvakudu (transl. Young man) is a 2000 Indian Telugu-language romantic drama film released on May 18, 2000. It was produced by Akkineni Nagarjuna and N.Sudhakar Reddy, and directed by A. Karunakaran. It stars Sumanth and Bhumika Chawla in her film debut. The film was the second venture for both Karunakaran and Sumanth. The film was critically hailed, but failed at the box office. The film won two Nandi Awards.

== Plot ==
Yuvakudu is the story of a free spirited college student Siva (Sumanth) who shares a very close bond with his mother (Jayasudha). He is the son of an army officer killed in the line of duty. Despite his mother's disapproval, Siva secretly harbours a strong desire of following in his father's footsteps and joining the army. Meanwhile, he falls in love with Sindhu (Bhumika Chawla), but she does not reciprocate his love. She rejects his proposal, and the relationship takes a sour tone. Siva's mother, aware of her son's love for Sindhu, tries to bring them together. She meets Sindhu, who takes an instant liking for her. She eventually asks Sindhu to marry her son. Sindhu accepts the proposal, saying that she is doing so only for Siva's mother. Despite a rocky start, their marriage finally settles down, and Sindhu grows to love Siva. However, the story takes an unexpected turn when Siva gets recruited into the army. He joins the army against his mother's wishes, thereby causing a rift. Siva eventually proves himself in the line of duty and reconciles with his mother and Sindhu.

== Cast ==
- Sumanth as Siva
- Bhumika Chawla as Sindhu
- Jayasudha as Padmavati, Siva's mother
- Ali as Siva's friend
- Venu Madhav as Satish
- Kota Srinivasa Rao as R. T. C. Officer
- Surya as Police officer
- Rathan Mouli as Sindhu's father
- Master Tanish

== Production ==
The film was launched at Annapurna Studios. The climax is based on a real incident that happened in Coimbatore.

== Soundtrack ==
All music is composed by Mani Sharma.

Track list
| No. | Title | Lyrics | Singer(s) | Length |
|---|---|---|---|---|
| 1. | "Tattatai Jatulayya" | Sirivennela Seetharama Sastry | Shankar Mahadevan | 4:03 |
| 2. | "Jagada Jagada" | Veturi | Devi Sri Prasad | 4:24 |
| 3. | "Chitikeste" | Sirivennela Seetharama Sastry | Devi Sri Prasad | 3:56 |
| 4. | "Maikam Kaadidi" | Sirivennela Seetharama Sastry | S. P. Charan | 4:41 |
| 5. | "Naa Paadham" | Sirivennela Seetharama Sastry | Parthasarathy | 4:57 |
| Total length: | | | | 22:01 |

== Reception ==
A critic from Full Hyderabad wrote that "Apart from the military sequence in the end and a couple of sequences in college hostels and canteens, the whole film centers around these three characters. And Karunakaran needs to be congratulated for his deft handling of the film". Andhra Today wrote "Director Karunakaran does not disappoint his audience who had unshaken faith in him after his hit "Toli Prema". The movie has an excellent engrossing story with a message and a well-conceived screen-play that keeps the audience glued to their seats".

== Awards ==
Nandi Awards - 2000

- Best Character Actress - Jayasudha
- Special Jury Award - Nagarjuna (producer of the film)
