= Jyothi (1976 film) =

- Theatrical poster
- Directed by: K. Raghavendra Rao
- Written by: Satyanand
- Based on: Mamatala kovela by C. Ananda Rao
- Produced by: Kranthi Kumar
- Starring: Murali Mohan; Jayasudha; Gummadi; Chaya Devi; Giribabu; Rao Gopala Rao; J.V. Somayajulu; Krishna Kumari; Shubha
- Cinematography: A. Vincent
- Edited by: V. Ankireddy
- Music by: K. Chakravarthy
- Release date: 4 June 1976
- Country: India
- Language: Telugu

Jyothi is a 1976 Telugu-language film directed by K. Raghavendra Rao. It is based on the story of an innocent girl "Jyothi." Jayasudha won the Filmfare Award for Best Actress – Telugu for her titular performance. She later credited the film's success for making her a famous actress in Telugu films.

== Plot ==
Jyothi (Jayasudha), a teenage girl who is in love with Ravi (Murali Mohan), suddenly marries Rajayya (Gummadi), a man who is about her father's age. Everyone thinks she married him for the old man's property that she inherits after the marriage, but the truth is different. The secret behind this unexpected marriage forms the rest of the gripping family story.

== Cast ==
- Murali MohanasRavi
- Jayasudha as Jyothi
- GummadiasRajayya
- Kaikala Satya Narayana
- Chaya Devi
- Giribabu
- Rao Gopala Rao
- J.V. Somayajulu
- Krishna Kumari
- Kaikala Satyanarayana
- Shubha
- Chidatala Appa Rao
- Jayalakshmi

== Production ==
Despite Raghavendra Rao's debut film Babu (1975) becoming a failure, Kranthi Kumar had confidence in him and assigned him to direct Jyothi.

The film was inspired by the Hindi film Mili (1975), though the storyline is completely different from the original except for the heroine suffering from a deadly disease.

== Soundtrack ==
All lyrics are written by Aatreya; all music is composed by K. Chakravarthy.

Songs
No.	Title	Playback	Length
1.	"Edu Kondala Paina Ela Velisavo"	P. Susheela
2.	"First Time Idi Neeku Best Time"	P. Susheela
3.	"Neeku naaku pellanta"	S. P. Balasubrahmanyam, P. Susheela
4.	"Sirimalle Puvvalle Navvu, Chinnari Papalle Navvu"	S. P. Balasubrahmanyam, S. Janaki

== Accolades ==
Filmfare Awards South

- Filmfare Award for Best Actress – Telugu - Jayasudha
- Filmfare Special Award for Excellent Performance - Gummadi
