= Bairisetty Bhaskara Rao =

Indian film director and screenwriter (1936–2014)

- Born: 1936; Andhra Pradesh, India
- Died: 2014 (aged 77–78); Hyderabad
- Occupation: Director
- Awards: Nandi Awards 1974

Bairisetty Bhaskara Rao (1936–2014), also known as B. Bhaskar Rao, was a director and screenwriter of Indian films. In 1974, he received the Nandi Award for Best Story Writer, for his film Manushulu Matti Bommalu. He directed Gruha Pravesam in 1982, which was Mohan Babu's debut as a hero. He directed many superstars of Tollywood, including Chiranjeevi, Krishna, Sobhan Babu, and Krishnam Raju.

== Filmography ==
=== Director ===
- Bhoolokamlo Rambha Urvashi Menaka (1989)
- Shri Ramchandrudu (1989)
- Asthulu Anthasthulu (1988)
- Shri Tatavatharam (1988)
- Sardar Dharmanna (1987)
- Ummadi Mogudu (1987)
- Mama Kodalu Saval (1986)
- Sakkanodu (1986)
- Aggiraju (1985)
- Sreevaru (1985)
- Kalyana Thilakam (1985)
- Bharatamlo Sankharavam (1984)
- Chadarangam (1984)
- Sadarangam (1984)
- Grihalakshmi (1984)
- Dharmaatmudu (1983)
- Kumkuma Tilakam (1983)
- Radha My Darling (1982)
- Gruha Pravesam (1982)
- Chal Mohana Ranga (1978)
- Manushulu Matti Bommalu (1974)

=== Assistant director ===
- Parvati Kalyanam (1958)
- Repu Neede (1957)
- Cherupukura Chedevu (1955)

== Awards ==
- Nandi Award for Second Best Story Writer - Manushulu Matti Bommalu (1974)
