= Idhi Katha Kadhu =

1979 film by K. Balachander

- Official poster
- Directed by: K. Balachander
- Written by: K. Balachander
- Based on: Avargal
- Starring: Jayasudha; Kamal Haasan; Chiranjeevi; Sarath Babu; Saritha; Leelavathi
- Cinematography: B.S.Loknath
- Music by: M. S. Viswanathan
- Release date: 27 June 1979
- Country: India
- Language: Telugu

Idhi Katha Kadhu (transl. "This is not a story") is a 1979 Indian Telugu-language drama film directed by K. Balachander, starring Jayasudha, Kamal Haasan, Chiranjeevi, Sarath Babu and, Saritha. It is a remake of Balachander's own Tamil film Avargal (1977). Jayasudha reprised the role of Sujatha in the original. Kamal Haasan starred in the same role in both versions. This film also had Chiranjeevi as the villainous husband of Jayasudha (Rajinikanth starred as the husband in the Tamil version). The film was shot in black and white. Jayasudha won the Nandi Award for Best Actress.

== Plot ==
The movie revolves around the trials and tribulations of Suhasini (Jayasudha), a happy-go-lucky girl who is madly in love with her boyfriend Bharani (Sarath Babu). Her life changes when her father gets transferred to Mumbai (then Bombay). Her love life falls apart as Bharani doesn't respond to any of her letters. In addition, her father becomes seriously ill. Her father's office colleague, Sugunakar Rao (Chiranjeevi), becomes a great source of strength for her in these tough times. Soon, he asks for her hand in marriage. She accepts gratefully and confesses that she had a boyfriend, who has seemingly forgotten her.

However, she soon learns that Sugunakar Rao is a sadistic and jealous husband, who tortures her no end and, not unsurprisingly, she opts for a divorce. As a divorced woman, with an infant in her hands, she lands in Chennai (then Madras) to take up a new job and start a new life.

Her life takes a turn for the better in Chennai as she has a very supportive friends group in her office, particularly a widower, Janardhan aka Johnny (Kamal Haasan). Johnny, a talented ventriloquist who "talks" through his puppet, Junior. He falls in love with Suhasini but is unable to muster up the courage to tell her about it.

In an interesting cinematic twist, her ex-husband's mother discovers her presence in the city and takes up a job as a maid in her house.

Suhasini also stumbles upon Bharani in Chennai and discovers that her letters to him never reached as they were intercepted by his mentally-challenged sister. Soon, Suhasini renews her relationship with Bharani and life seems to be looking up for her. But the ghosts of the past continue to haunt her. Sugunakar Rao comes to Chennai in the role of her boss – a contrite and repentant Sugunakar, who now wants to remarry Suhasini and redress the wrongs he had done. The situation becomes piquant with 3 men vying for Suhasini – her ex-love, her ex-husband and a silent lover lurking on the sidelines. In the later part of the movie, Suhasini realises that Sugunakar is just trying to destroy her life and Bharani too is now interested in another girl due to her inability to take a decision about their marriage. Finally johnny expresses his love to suhasini.But suhasini rejects softly and instead of love suhasini admire &respect johnny.In the end, she decides to shift to different city to start a new life and Johnny helps her in that and says that he is always waiting for her. Her Mother-in-law too accompanies her to look after her grandson and thus they plan to start a new life.

== Cast ==
As per the opening credits:

- Jayasudha as Suhasini
- Kamal Haasan as Johnny
- Chiranjeevi as Sugunakar Rao
- Sarath Babu as Bharani
- Leelavathi as Suhasini mother-in-law
- Saritha as Gayatri
- J. V. Ramana Murthy
- Rama Prabha
- Manavalan Joseph
- Sakshi Ranga Rao
- Vallam Narasimha Rao

== Soundtrack ==
Idhi Katha Kadhu

Soundtrack album by M. S. Viswanathan
- Released: 1979
- Genre: Feature film soundtrack
- Language: Telugu
- Producer: M. S. Viswanathan
External audio
- Audio Jukebox on YouTube

Tracklist
No.	Title	Lyrics	Singer(s)	Length
1.	"Gaalikadupu Ledu Kadalikanthu Ledu"	Acharya Aatreya	S. Janaki
2.	"Jola Paata Paadi Ooyalaoopana"	Acharya Aatreya	P. Susheela
3.	"Junior Junior Atu Itu Kaani Hrudayam Toti"	Acharya Aatreya	S. P. Balasubrahmanyam, Ramola
4.	"Sarigamalu Galagalalu"	Acharya Aatreya	S. P. Balasubrahmanyam, P. Susheela
5.	"Oka Intiki Mukhadwaram"	Acharya Aatreya	S. P. Balasubrahmanyam
