= Jayasudha =

Indian actress and politician (born 1958)

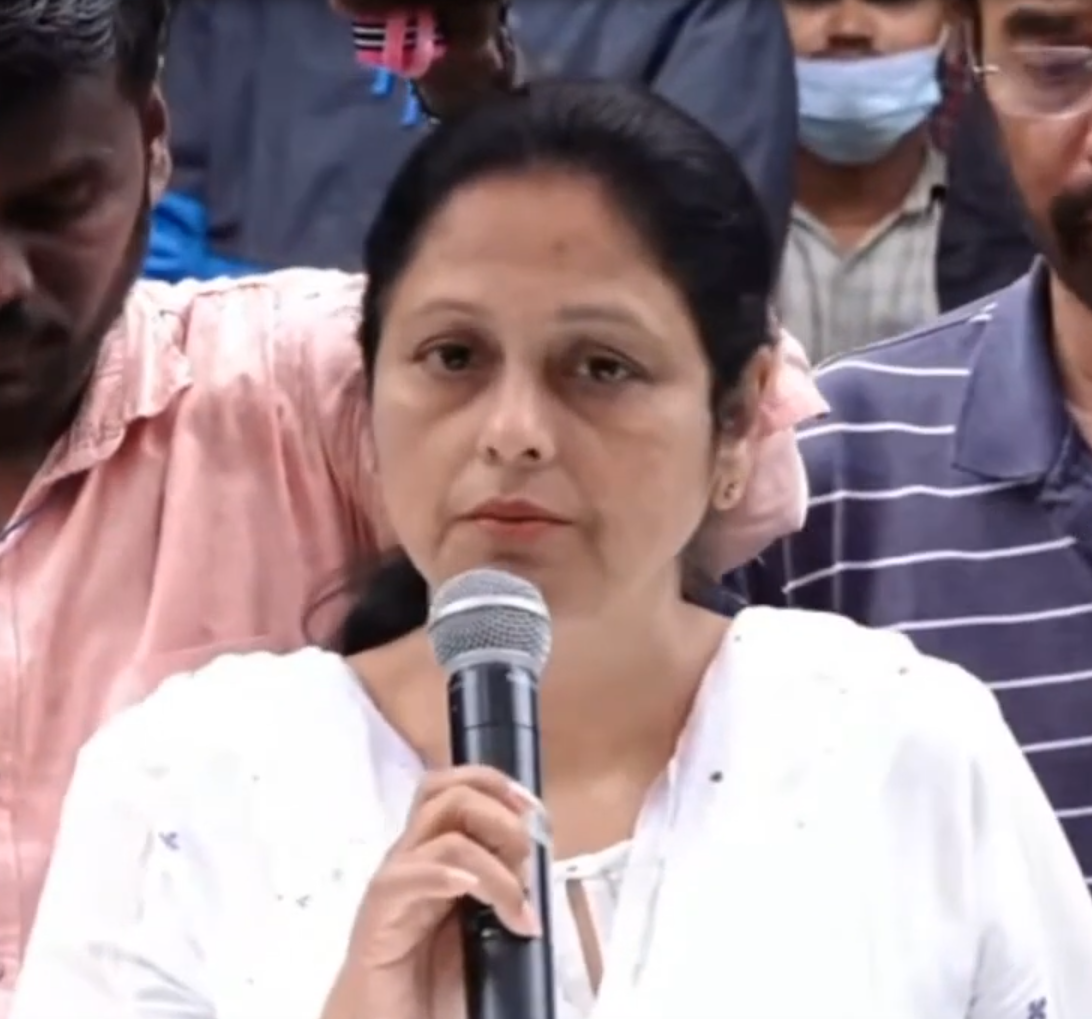
- Jayasudha in April 2024

Member of Andhra Pradesh Legislative Assembly
- In office 2009–2014
- Preceded by: Talasani Srinivas Yadav
- Succeeded by: T. Padma Rao Goud
- Constituency: Secunderabad

Personal details
- Born: Sujatha Samarthi; 17 December 1958 (age 67) Madras, Madras State, India (present-day Chennai, Tamil Nadu)
- Party: Bharatiya Janata Party (since 2023)
- Other political affiliations: Indian National Congress (2009–2016); Telugu Desam Party (2016–2019); YSR Congress Party (2019–2023)
- Spouses: Kakarlapudi Rajendra Prasad (m. 1982, divorced) Nitin Kapoor (m. 1985; died 2017)
- Children: 2
- Relatives: See Nidudavolu Family
- Occupation: Actress; politician

Jayasudha Kapoor (born as Sujatha Samarthi; 17 December 1958), known mononymously as Jayasudha is an Indian actress and politician known for her works predominantly in Telugu cinema. She has also worked in some Tamil, Kannada, Malayalam, and Hindi films. Known as a natural actress, in a career spanning over 5 decades she has received nine state Nandi Awards for her acting in works such as Jyothi (1976), Idhi Katha Kadhu (1979), Premabhishekam (1981), Meghasandesam (1982), and Dharmaatmudu (1983).

She has garnered five Filmfare Awards South, for her performances in Jyothi (1976), Aame Katha (1977), Gruha Pravesam (1982), Amma Nanna O Tamila Ammayi (2004), and Kotha Bangaru Lokam (2008). She received the ANR National Award (2008) and the Filmfare Lifetime Achievement Award - South (2010) for her contributions to Indian cinema. Jayasudha served as Member of Legislative Assembly, from Secunderabad constituency during 2009–2014 in the erstwhile combined Government of Andhra Pradesh.

== Early and personal life ==
Jayasudha was born as Sujatha Samarthi in Madras, Tamil Nadu on 17 December 1958, to a Telugu speaking family. Her father Samarthi Ramesh Chander was a Brahmo Samaj believer, and her mother Joga Bai is the daughter of eminent scholar and literary historian Nidudavolu Venkatarao. Joga Bai was known for films such as Balanandam (1954), and Kalahasti Mahatyam (1954). Jayasudha's paternal grandfather, and director Vijaya Nirmala's father Samarthi Rammohan Rao are brothers. Her first marriage was to film producer Vadde Ramesh's brother-in-law, Kakarlapudi Rajendra Prasad. However, the marriage ended in divorce. She then married Nitin Kapoor, cousin to actor Jeetendra, in 1985 and they have two children, sons Nihar (born in 1986) and Shreayan (born in 1990).

She was elected as MLA from the Secunderabad constituency in 2009 Andhra Pradesh Assembly elections from Indian National Congress. She later joined the Telugu Desam Party in 2016. Later in 2019 she quit the Telugu Desam Party and joined YSR Congress Party.

== Career ==
Jayasudha made her film debut when she was thirteen years old with the Telugu film Pandanti Kapuram (1972). Director K. Balachander gave her a small role in the Tamil film Arangetram where she shared space with Kamal Haasan. She acted in a number of films in Telugu and Tamil mostly under Balachander's direction Sollathaan Ninaikkiren (1973), Naan Avanillai (1974) and Apoorva Raagangal and in Idhi Katha Kadhu with Chiranjeevi. She also changed her name to Jayasudha, since there was already another actress named Sujatha. Her fame quickly spread, where Telugu film producers were offering her good film roles.

While her debut role as a heroine in the Telugu film Lakshmana Rekha (1975) got her attention, the title role in Jyothi (remake of the Hindi film Mili starring Jaya Bhaduri) made her a star in Telugu films. She was called a successor to the Telugu actress Savitri and performed many roles. She is given the title "Sahaja Nati" which means "natural/realistic actress."

Her roles varied from the cute-looking teeny-bopper who wore minis in Nomu (1974), to that of a tortured wife of a sadist husband in K. Balachander's film Idhi Katha Kadhu (1979) to that of a comedian who discovers that her husband wants to murder her for her wealth in Money (1993). She performed showy roles in Telugu remakes of Hindi films, such as Yugandhar (1979) (the fighter role that Zeenat Aman originated in Don), Illalu (Reena Roy's dark-shaded role from Apnapan).

In commercial cinema, she received a huge break when she starred in Adavi Ramudu (1977), which broke box office records. She also showed innovativeness and lack of vanity in original Telugu films like Premabhishekam (1981) where she played a supporting role as a deglamorized prostitute, while Sridevi played the female lead. She has acted in 300-plus feature films in a variety of roles, and in one year, she had 24 film releases. She has made her unique space in the Telugu cinema industry amidst a huge competition between her contemporary actresses Sridevi and Jayaprada.

== Awards ==
Nandi Awards

- Nandi Award for Best Actress – Jyothi (1976)
- Nandi Award for Best Actress – Idhi Katha Kadhu (1979)
- Nandi Award for Best Actress – Premabhishekam (1981)
- Nandi Award for Best Actress – Meghasandesam (1982)
- Nandi Award for Best Actress – Dharmaatmudu (1983)
- Nandi Award for Best Supporting Actress – Swathi Chinukulu (1989)
- Nandi Award for Best Character Actress – Jailor Gaari Abbayi (1994)
- Nandi Award for Best Character Actress – Yuvakudu (2000)
- Nandi Award for Best Supporting Actress – Sathamanam Bhavati (2016)

Filmfare Awards South

- Filmfare Best Actress Award (Telugu) – Jyothi (1976)
- Filmfare Best Actress Award (Telugu) – Aame Katha (1977)
- Filmfare Special Jury Award – Premabhishekam (1981)
- Filmfare Best Actress Award (Telugu) – Grihapravesam (1982)
- Filmfare Best Supporting Actress Award (Telugu) – Amma Nanna O Tamila Ammayi (2004)
- Filmfare Best Supporting Actress Award (Telugu) – Kotha Bangaru Lokam (2008)
- Filmfare Lifetime Achievement Award - South (2010)

Other Awards

- Kalasagar Award for Best Actress – Meghasandesam (1982)
- Pride of Indian Cinema Award (2007)
- Andhra Pradesh Cinegoer's Association – Lifetime Achievement Award (2008)
- ANR National Award (2008)

== Legacy ==
In the 2019 biopic film NTR: Kathanayakudu, actress Payal Rajput portrayed Jayasudha onscreen.

== Filmography ==
=== Films ===
==== Telugu ====
List of performances in Telugu films
Year	Title	Role	Notes and Ref.
1972	Pandanti Kapuram	Santhi	Telugu Debut
1974	Tirapathi		
1974	Jeevitha Rangam		
1974	Nomu	Lata	
1974	Mugguru Ammalu		
1974	Aadapillala Thandri		
1975	Soggadu	Saroja	
1975	Bhagasthulu	Vijaya	
1975	Lakshmana Rekha		
1975	Samsaram		
1976	Raju Vedale		
1976	Monagadu	Radha	
1976	Mangalyaniki Maromudi		
1976	Alludochadu	Saroja	
1976	Kotalo Paga	Latha	
1976	Jyothi	Jyothi	
1976	Raaja	Rani	
1976	O Manishi Tirigi Choodu		
1976	Devudu Chesina Bommalu		
1976	Amma Nanna		
1976	Mahakavi Kshetreyya		
1976	Secretary	Prameela	
1977	Premalekhalu		
1977	Gadusu Ammayi		
1977	Gadasu Pillodu		
1977	Amara Deepam	Parvati	
1977	Adavi Ramudu	Chilakamma	
1977	Aame Katha		
1977	Ardhangi		
1977	Jeevitha Nouka		
1977	Edureeta	Manga	
1977	Jeevana Theeralu		
1977	Moratudu		
1977	Idekkadi Nyayam		
1978	Mallepuvvu		
1978	Sivaranjani	Sivaranjani	
1978	Nayudu Bava	Deepa	
1978	Lawyer Vishwanath	Geetha	
1978	KD No:1	Lilly Ratnam / Sarada and Sundari (dual role)	
1978	Katakatala Rudraiah		
1978	Kalanthakulu	Asha	
1978	Pranam Kareedu	Sita	
1978	Vichitra Jeevitham	Ganga	
1978	Rama Krishnulu	Lakshmi	
1978	Kaliyuga Sthri		
1978	Sri Rama Raksha		
1978	Manchi Babai		
1979	Yugandhar	Jaya	
1979	Shri Tirupati Venkateswara Kalyanam	Goddess Lakshmi	
1979	Seethe Ramudaithe	Seetha	
1979	Muddula Koduku		
1979	Sommokadidhi Sokokadidhi	Lily	
1979	Mande Gundelu	Varalakshmi	
1979	Kalyani	Kavita	
1979	Judagadu	Aruna	
1979	Intinti Ramayanam		
1979	Driver Ramudu	Chukkamma	
1979	Andamaina Anubhavam	Kamini	
1979	Idhi Katha Kadhu	Suhasini	
1979	Nindu Noorellu		
1979	Bangaru Chellalu		
1980	Sivamethina Satyam	Geetha	
1980	Srivari Muchatlu	Priya	
1980	Gopala Rao Gari Ammayi		
1980	Gajadonga		
1980	Yedanthasthula Meda	Sudha	
1980	Prema Tarangalu	Nisha	
1980	Pilla Zamindar	Chitti	
1980	Bangaru Lakshmi		
1980	Alludu Pattina Bharatham		
1980	Moogaku Matosthe		
1981	Premabhishekam	Jayanthi	
1981	Swargam	Suma	
1981	Illalu	Kalpana	
1981	Pakkinti Ammayi	Indira	
1981	Agni Poolu	Janaki	
1981	Aadavallu Meeku Joharulu		
1981	Addala Meda		Guest appearance
1981	Sathyabhama		
1981	Guvvala Janta		
1981	Samsaram Santhamam	Lavanya	
1981	Maha Purushudu	Padma	
1982	Yuvaraju	Aasha / Jyothi	
1982	Raga Deepam		
1982	Nipputho Chelagatam		
1982	Naa Desam	Mohini	
1982	Trisulam	Neeli	
1982	Madhura Swapnam	Radha	
1982	Anuraga Devatha	Tulasi	
1982	Gruha Pravesam	Lakshmi	
1982	Jayasudha	Jayasudha	
1982	Meghasandesam	Parvati	
1982	Bhale Kapuram		
1982	Illali Korikalu	Bharathi	
1982	Gopala Krishnudu	Sujatha	
1982	Korukunna Mogudu		
1982	Doctor Cine Actor	Radha	
1983	Chattaniki Veyyi Kallu	Savithri/Maya Devi	
1983	Ramudu Kadu Krishnudu	Satya	
1983	Raj Kumar		
1983	Poratam	Sudha	
1983	Lanke Bindelu	Rama	
1983	Iddaru Kiladilu		
1983	Amayakudu Kadhu Asadhyudu		
1983	Kumkuma Thilakam	Laxmi	
1983	Dharmaatmudu	Lakshmi	
1983	Koti Kokkadu		
1983	Oorantha Sankranthi	Durga	
1984	Yuddham		
1984	Jagan	Lalitha	
1984	Punyam Koddi Purushudu	Sathya	
1984	Iddaru Dongalu		
1984	Bangaru Kapuram	Sarada	
1984	Puli Joodam		
1984	Dandayatra	Durga	
1984	Danavudu	Latha	
1984	Bobbili Brahmanna	Kasturi	
1984	Bharyamani		
1984	Aada Puli		
1984	Bharatamlo Sankharavam		
1984	Kirayi Alludu		
1984	Justice Chakravarthy	Jayanthi	
1985	Nyayam Meere Cheppali	Kranti	
1985	Thirugubatu		
1985	Palnati Simham	Sujatha	
1985	Mangalya Balam		
1985	Maha Sangramam		
1985	Edadugula Bandham	Sarala	
1985	Andarikante Monagadu		
1985	Srimathi Garu		
1985	Kalyana Thilakam		
1985	O Thandri Theerpu	Seeta	
1985	Aggi Raju		
1986	Tandra Paparayudu	Mallamma	
1986	Muddula Manavaraalu		
1986	Chaitanyam		
1986	Dharmapeetam Daddarillindhi	Gauri	
1986	Aadi Dampathulu		
1986	Vijrumbhana	Bharathi	
1986	Magadheerudu		
1986	Jeevana Raagam		
1986	Neti Yugandharam		
1987	Aatma Bandhuvulu	Kalyani	
1987	Paga Saadhista	Annapurna Devi	
1987	Sardar Dharmanna		
1987	Srimathi Oka Bahumathi	Uma	
1987	Kirayi Dada	Rani Malini / Arunabai	
1987	Marana Sasanam	Gayatri Devi	
1988	Kanchana Seeta		
1988	O Bharya Katha	Indumathi and Prema Patel	
1988	Prithviraj	Ashwini	
1988	Bharyabhartala Bandam		
1988	Rao Gari Illu	Jaya	
1988	Ontari Poratam	Raja Rajeswari Devi	
1988	Jeevana Jyothi	Kalyani	
1988	Bharatamlo Bala Chandrudu	Vijaya	
1988	Brahma Puthrudu	Kiranmayi	
1988	Maa Inti Maharaju		
1989	Naa Mogudu Naake Sontham		
1989	Soggaadi Kaapuram	Vijaya	
1989	Vijay	Yamuna Devi	
1989	Black Tiger		
1989	Simha Swapnam	Annapurna	
1989	Swathi Chinukulu	Sudha	
1991	Kalikalam		
1992	Chillara Mogudu Allari Koduku		
1992	Repati Koduku		
1993	Money	Vijaya	
1993	Akka Pettanam Chelleli Kapuram	Ranganayaki	
1993	Vinta Kodallu	Kavya	
1993	Inspector Jhansi	Jhansi	
1993	Kalachakram		
1993	Srinatha Kavi Sarvabhoumudu	Sridevi	
1993	Mama Kodalu		
1993	Bava Bavamaridi	Janaki	
1993	Akka Chellalu		
1994	Thodi Kodallu		
1994	Bangaru Kutumbam	Savitri	
1994	Doragariki Donga Pellam		
1994	Money Money	Vijaya	
1994	Jeevitha Khaidi		
1994	Jailor Gaari Abbayi	Savitri	
1994	Rickshaw Rudraiah		
1994	Super Police	Journalist Renuka	
1995	Rikshavodu	Raju's mother	
1995	Aasthi Mooredu Aasa Baredu		
1995	Street Fighter	Krishnaveni	
1995	Aunty	Jyothi	
1995	Sankalpam	Municipal Commissioner Vyjayanthi	
1995	Bhale Bullodu	Jayanti	
1996	Deyyam	Sindhumathi	
1996	Akka Bagunnava	Lakshmi	
1996	Pellala Rajyam		
1997	Pattukondi Chuddam		
1997	Atha Nee Koduku Jagratha		
1998	Daddy Daddy	Sarada	
1998	Pape Naa Pranam		
1998	Aahaa..!	Rajeswari	
1999	English Pellam East Godavari Mogudu		Guest appearance
2000	Rayalaseema Ramanna Chowdary	Seetha	
2000	Yuvakudu	Padmavati	
2000	Kante Koothurne Kanu	Satya	
2000	Sri Sai Mahima		
2001	Chinna		
2001	Ammaye Navvithe	Rajeswari	
2002	Hai	Aryan's mother	
2003	Fools	Deepti's mother	
2003	Amma Nanna O Tamila Ammayi	Lakshmi	
2003	Vishnu	Vishnu's mother	
2005	Balu ABCDEFG	Rajeswari Devi	
2006	Style	Raghava's mother	
2006	Valliddari Vayasu Padahare	Vamsee's mother	
2006	Bommarillu	Lakshmi Addala	
2006	Photo	Swapna's mother	
2007	Vijaya Dasami	Chennamaneni Mahalakshmi	
2008	Parugu	Yashoda	
2008	Raksha	Dr. Seema	
2008	Kalidasu	Kanakadurga	
2008	Kotha Bangaru Lokam	Balu's mother	
2009	Neramu Siksha	Saujanya	
2011	Solo	Vaishnavi's aunt	
2012	Daruvu	Parvathamma	
2012	Adhinayakudu	Lakshmi	
2012	Sarocharu	Lakshmi	
2013	Seethamma Vakitlo Sirimalle Chettu	Saavitri	
2014	Yevadu	Dr. Shailaja	
2014	Rowdy	Lakshmii	
2014	Govindudu Andarivadele	Baby	
2016	Oopiri	Seenu's mother	
2016	Brahmotsavam	Rajyalakshmi	
2019	Ruler	Sarojini Naidu	
2019	Maharshi	Yashoda	
2022	Pratibimbalu		
2023	Malli Pelli	Narendra's mother	
2023	Custody	Judge	
2023	Miss Shetty Mr Polishetty	Anvitha's mother	
2025	Bhairavam	Nagarathnamma	
2026	Summer Holidays		

==== Tamil ====
Tamil film credits
Year	Title	Role	Note
1972	Kula Gouravam		Tamil Debut
1973	Sollathaan Ninaikkiren	Sudha	
1973	Petha Manam Pithu	Radha	
1973	Bharatha Vilas	Mohini	
1973	Arangetram	Devi	
1973	Baghdad Perazhagi	Shakila	
1974	Vellikhizhamai Viratham		
1974	Prayachittham		
1974	Dheerga Sumangali	Babu's wife	
1974	Pandhattam		
1974	Naan Avanillai	Rani	
1975	Aayirathil Oruthi	Sudha	
1975	Apoorva Raagangal	Ranjani	
1975	Mannavan Vanthaanadi	Latha	
1975	Melnaattu Marumagal	Sudha	
1975	Pattikkaattu Raja	Usha	
1976	Maharasi Vazhga		
1976	Athirshtam Azhaikirathu		
1979	Pattakkathi Bhairavan	Roopa	
1979	Ninaithale Inikkum	Kamini	
1992	Pandiyan	Inspector Vijayalakshmi	
1993	Rajadurai	Uma Devi	
1994	Mahanadhi	Narmada	only appears in portrait used on set
1996	Anthimanthaarai	Thangam	
2000	Alai Payuthey	Saroja	
2001	Thavasi	Thavasi's wife	
2009	1977	Vetrivel's mother	
2016	Thozha	Seenu's mother	Simultaneously shot in Telugu
2018	Chekka Chivantha Vaanam	Lakshmi Senapathi	
2023	Varisu	Sudha Rajendran	
2023	Custody	Judge	Simultaneously shot in Telugu

==== Malayalam ====
Year	Title	Role	Note
1975	Rasaleela	Unnimaya	Malayalam Debut
1975	Thiruvonam	Shandini	
1976	Romeo		
1976	Mohiniyattam		
1977	Shivathandavam		
1978	Priyadarshini		
1981	Jeevikkan Padikkanam		
1993	Sarovaram	Rajalakshmi/Sony	
2001	Ishtam	Sridevi	
2026	I'm Game	Mercy John	

==== Hindi ====
Year	Title	Role	Note
1977	Aaina	Usha	Hindi Debut
1979	Shabhash Daddy	Pinki	
1984	Zakhmi Sher	Anandi	
1999	Sooryavansham	Shardha Thakur	

==== Kannada ====
Year	Title	Role	Note
1985	Nee Thanda Kanike	Meena	Kannada Debut
2007	Thayiya Madilu	Nannda Kumar's Mother	
2010	Janani		
2015	Vajrakaya	Lakshmi	

==== Television ====
Television Credits
Year	Title	Network	Language	Role	Notes
2000-2001	Janani	ETV	Telugu		
2002-2003	Gayathri	Gemini TV	Telugu	Gayathri	
2026	Love Always	Jio hotstar	Tamil	Manjula	Webseries

=== As a producer ===
Year	Title	Notes
1986	Aadi Dampatulu	
1987	Kanchana Sita	
1990	Kalikalam	
1990	Mera Pati Sirf Mera Hai	
1992	Adrustam	
1993	Vinta Kodallu	
2000	Hands Up	

=== As a story writer ===
Year	Title	Notes
2000	Hands Up	
