= Premabhishekam (1981 film) =

- Theatrical release poster
- Directed by: Dasari Narayana Rao
- Written by: Dasari Narayana Rao
- Produced by: Venkat Akkineni; Nagarjuna Akkineni
- Starring: Akkineni Nageswara Rao; Jayasudha; Sridevi; Murali Mohan; Mohan Babu
- Cinematography: P. S. Selvaraj
- Edited by: B. Krishnam Raju
- Music by: Chakravarthy
- Production company: Annapurna Studios
- Release date: 18 February 1981
- Running time: 147 minutes
- Country: India
- Language: Telugu
- Box office: est. ₹4.5 crore

Premabhishekam (transl. Anointing of Love) is a 1981 Indian Telugu-language romantic drama film written and directed by Dasari Narayana Rao. This film is inspired by the 1964 Hollywood movie Send Me No Flowers. It is produced by Annapurna Studios, starring Akkineni Nageswara Rao, Jayasudha, Sridevi, Murali Mohan, Mohan Babu and musical composition by Chakravarthy.

Released on 18 February 1981, Premabhishekam was a success grossing over ₹4.5 crore at the box office. It had a theatrical run of 527 days and became the first film to complete a 75-week run in Andhra Pradesh. The film won four Nandi Awards and two Filmfare Awards South. It was later remade in Tamil as Vazhvey Maayam (1982) and in Hindi as Prem Tapasya (1983).

== Cast ==
- Akkineni Nageswara Rao as Rajesh
- Sridevi as Devi
- Jayasudha as Jayanthi
- Murali Mohan as Prasad
- Mohan Babu as Dr. Chakravarthy
- Gummadi as Dr. Venkateswarulu
- Prabhakar Reddy as Satya Murthy
- Padmanabham
- Eeswara Rao
- Raja
- Pushpalata as Lakshmi
- Kavitha as Kalpana
- Nirmalamma
- Master Harish

== Production ==
Dasari Narayana Rao wrote the story, screenplay, and dialogues in addition to lyrics. The film has editing by B. Krishnam Raju and cinematography by P. S. Selvaraj. Nageswara Rao's sons, Venkat Akkineni and Nagarjuna Akkineni, produced the film under Annapurna Studios. The film's shoot began on 20 September 1980 on Nageswara Rao's birthday. The film was entirely shot in Hyderabad except for songs "Kottappa Kondu" and "Vandanam" which were shot at Madras (now Chennai).

== Soundtrack ==
Premabhishekam

Film score by Chakravarthy
- Released: 1981
- Genre: Soundtrack
- Length: 32:55
- Label: SEA Records
- Producer: Chakravarthy

Chakravarthy chronology
Prema Simhasanam (1981)	Premabhishekam (1981)	Prema Kanuka (1981)

Music composed by Chakravarthy. Lyrics were written by Dasari Narayana Rao. Music released on SEA Records Audio Company. The song "Nee Kallu" was reused in the film's Tamil remake Vaazhvey Maayam as "Mazhaikaala Megam".

S. No.	Song title	Singers	length
1	"Naa Kallu Chebuthunnayi"	S. P. Balasubrahmanyam, P. Susheela	4:18
2	"Devi Mounama"	S. P. Balasubrahmanyam, P. Susheela	4:40
3	"Oka Devuni Gudilo"	S. P. Balasubrahmanyam, P. Susheela	4:31
4	"Kotappa Kondaku"	S. P. Balasubrahmanyam, P. Susheela	4:33
5	"Tharalu Digivachina"	S. P. Balasubrahmanyam, P. Susheela	4:28
6	"Vandanam Abhivandanam"	S. P. Balasubrahmanyam, P. Susheela	4:15
7	"Agadhu Agadhu"	S. P. Balasubrahmanyam	6:10

== Box office ==
The film has completed 100 days directly in 25 centres. The film has completed 175 days directly in 16 centres and also ran for 365 days in some theatres in the Telugu states. The film ran for 750 days in 2 centers in Andhra Pradesh and 75 weeks in Bangalore.

== Awards ==
Nandi Awards

- Best Actress - Jayasudha
- Best Male Playback Singer - S. P. Balasubrahmanyam
- Best Art Director - Bhaskar Raju
- Special Jury Award - Dasari Narayana Rao

Filmfare Awards South

- Filmfare Award for Best Director - Telugu - Dasari Narayana Rao - Won
- Filmfare Special Jury Award - Jayasudha -Won
- Filmfare Award for Best Actress – Telugu - Jayasudha - Nominated
- Filmfare Award for Best Actress – Telugu - Sridevi - Nominated
