= Arangetram (1973 film) =

1973 film by K. Balachander

- Poster
- Directed by: K. Balachander
- Written by: K. Balachander
- Produced by: N. Selvaraj; J. Duraisamy; V. Govindarajan
- Starring: Prameela
- Cinematography: B. S. Lokanath
- Edited by: N. R. Kittu
- Music by: V. Kumar
- Production company: Kalakendra Films
- Release date: 9 February 1973
- Running time: 152 minutes
- Country: India
- Language: Tamil

Arangetram (pronounced [aɾaŋɡeːʈram] transl. Debut performance) is a 1973 Indian Tamil-language drama film written and directed by K. Balachander. The film stars Prameela, leading an ensemble cast that includes S. V. Subbaiah, Sivakumar, Sasikumar, Kamal Haasan, M. N. Rajam, Sundari Bai and Senthamarai. It revolves around a young woman who takes to prostitution to support her conservative but poor family.

Arangetram marked Kamal Haasan's first adult role, while Prameela, Jayachitra and Jayasudha made their acting debut in Tamil with this film. V. Kumar composed the music for the film, which was the last Balachander film he worked on. Cinematography was handled by B. S. Lokanath, and editing by N. R. Kittu.

Arangetram was released on 9 February 1973. Though it had carried hard hitting messages and very bold scenes and was controversial at the time of its release, the film became a commercial success. In 1974 it was remade in Telugu as Jeevitha Rangam (1974), and in Hindi as Aaina by Balachander himself.

== Plot ==
Ramu Shastrigal is a poor priest living with his wife Visalam and their eight children. His rigid principles and obstinate behaviour become obstacles to his family's progress. His spendthrift sister Janaki lands in his house with her daughter, adding to their woes and penury. Lalitha, the eldest daughter of Ramu Shastrigal, is enthusiastic to work but her father does not permit it. She bonds with the family's neighbour Nadesa Udaiyaar and his son Thangavelu. Thangavelu expresses his love for Lalitha and his desire to marry her; when Udaiyaar refuses to permit it, he leaves the house. Soon, Thangavelu dies in a military conflict.

Ramu Shastrigal's family suffers due to poverty; on many nights, they go to bed hungry. When Lalitha's hungry brother shares a meal with a beggar, she decides to disobey her father and with Udaiyaar's help, obtains employment. Her income supplements the family and their standard of living improves. Her brother Thyagu aspires to become a doctor; Lalitha runs from pillar to post to get him a seat in a medical college. When she meets a man to facilitate his admission in a medical college in Madras, he exploits her desperation and rapes her. Lalitha keeps quiet about this incident and goes back to work. She shifts to Hyderabad, where she gets promoted with a higher salary. Immediately after taking up the new assignment, she asks her employer for a salary advance to be sent to Thyagu for his admission fee; realising her vulnerability, he demands her carnal company. She yields and he gives her the money. Demands from her family increase and to earn more money, she turns to prostitution. While her family lives prosperously, Lalitha suffers silently.

One day, Thangavelu lands in Lalitha's house looking for a prostitute. Both are shocked to see each other; Thangavelu, who had faked his own death just to irritate his father, is upset that Lalitha has fallen so low and leaves. As years pass, Lalitha's siblings progress; Thyagu becomes a doctor, sister Mangalam becomes a singer; younger sister Devi falls in love with Pasupathy, son of a landlord, and their marriage is fixed. Lalitha returns home after a long time and is warmly received. But she feels depressed and frustrated to know that her mother is again in the family way and criticises her parents' lack of responsibility. On the day of Devi's wedding, Lalitha is shocked to see that Pasupathy, her client in Hyderabad, is the groom. She fears he would cancel the wedding knowing that the bride is her sister, but he performs the wedding rituals mechanically and looks withdrawn. Lalitha and Pasupathy meet privately, decide to forget past incidents and move on. When Udaiyaar is about to perform the thevasam for his son, Lalitha intervenes and reveals that Thangavelu is alive, but does not explain the circumstances under which they met.

Thyagu falls in love with Bhama, a Tehsildar’s daughter, and their engagement is arranged. When Ramu Shastrigal and Visalam go to Udaiyaar's house to invite him for the engagement, they meet Thangavelu, who has returned home and ask him where he met Lalitha. He remains silent, but after they leave, tells his father how and where he met Lalitha. Lalitha's parents overhear this and are shocked; Ramu Shastrigal and Thyagu disown Lalitha. The Tehsildar agrees to continue the wedding only if Lalitha is sent out of home, and she is mercilessly thrown out by Thyagu and Ramu Shastrigal. Udaiyaar, who understands her sacrifices, takes her to his home. To give her the dignity she deserves, he requests Thangavelu to marry her, which he accepts. The wedding of Thangavelu and Lalitha takes alongside Thyagu's wedding with Bhama. Though Lalitha is grateful to Udaiyaar and Thangavelu for their magnanimity, the trauma she has undergone results in her becoming insane.

== Cast ==
- Prameela as Lalitha
- S. V. Subbaiah as Ramu Shastrigal
- Sivakumar as Thangavel
- Sasikumar as Pasupathy
- Kamal Haasan as Thyagu
- M. N. Rajam as Visalam
- Sundari Bai as Janaki
- Senthamarai as Natesan Udaiyaar
- Oru Viral Krishna Rao as Jayaraman
- Neelu as a music teacher
- Chitra as Meenu
- Girija as Girija
- Jayachitra as Mangalam
- Jayasudha as Devi
- Baby Tulasi
- Jaishankar as himself (special appearance)
- Lakshmi as herself (special appearance)

== Production ==
After showing her as a prostitute for most of the movie, I couldn't give her a happy ending. In those days – the early seventies – the society was very traditional. I didn't want to alienate my audience, so I tried to strike a balance between what I wanted to convey and what I thought my audience would accept.

— K. Balachander in 2006

After the release of Velli Vizha (1972), director K. Balachander felt that films must highlight ideas that help society, and he had to dare to shoot stories that others would be reluctant to touch; this laid the foundation for Arangetram. T. S. B. K. Moulee said in an interview in 2014 that Balachander, who used to watch Moulee's plays, wanted him to write the comedy subplot for the film as he liked Moulee's style of writing. However, Moulee felt the film did not warrant a comedy subplot as it would "dilute its seriousness" and did not work in the film. The film marked Kamal Haasan's first adult role, while Prameela, Jayachitra and Jayasudha made their acting debut in Tamil with this film. The film was produced by N. Selvaraj, J. Duraisamy and V. Govindarajan under Kalakendra Films. Cinematography was handled by B. S. Lokanath, and editing by N. R. Kittu.

== Soundtrack ==
The music was composed by V. Kumar, with lyrics by Kannadasan. The song "Mappillai Ragasiyam" is set in Charukesi raga.

Song	Singers	Duration
"Aandavanin Thottathile"	P. Susheela	3:24
"Kannanidam Endhan Karutthinai"	K. Swarna	2:10
"Moothaval Nee"	P. Susheela	4:29
"Aaramba Kaalaththil"	S. P. Balasubrahmanyam, P. Susheela	3:51
"Kannanai Kaanbadharko"	Thiruchi Loganathan & K. Swarna	2:42
"Mappilai Ragasiyam"	L. R. Eswari	3:27
"Enadi Marumagale Unnai Evaradi Pesivittaar"	T. V. Rathnam	0:25
"Kannaarkkum Katravarum"	K. Swarna	0:39
"Paaviye Kanda Vannam"	K. Swarna	1:00
"Srimaathaa Srimaha"	K. Swarna	0:40
"Agara Mudaka Nagurasa"	K. Swarna	0:19

== Release and reception ==
Arangetram was released on 9 February 1973. It was the first film to be released at the then newly opened Vettri Theatres. Reviewing for the magazine Film World, T. G. Vaidyanathan wrote, "Arangetram marks a new beginning, a fresh approach and is a veritable oasis in the dreary desert wastes of Tamil Cinema." Navamani praised the acting and direction. Though the film carried hard hitting messages and bold scenes and was controversial at the time of its release, it became a critical and commercial success. The film was featured as part of the Tamil Nadu government's information campaign promoting family planning.

== Remakes ==
In 1974, the film was remade in Telugu as Jeevitha Rangam, and in Hindi as Aaina by Balachander himself.

== Bibliography ==
- Dhananjayan, G. (2011). The Best of Tamil Cinema, 1931 to 2010: 1931–1976. Galatta Media. OCLC 733724281.
- Ramachandran, Naman (2014) [2012]. Rajinikanth: The Definitive Biography. New Delhi: Penguin Books. ISBN 978-81-8475-796-5.
