= Dharmaatmudu =

- Theatrical poster
- Directed by: Bairisetty Bhaskara Rao
- Story by: Prabhakar Reddy
- Produced by: K. Kesava Rao
- Starring: Krishnam Raju; Jayasudha
- Cinematography: M. Sattibabu
- Edited by: K. A. Marthand
- Music by: Satyam
- Production company: Sri Bhramarambika Films
- Release date: 16 September 1983
- Country: India
- Language: Telugu

Dharmaatmudu (transl. The Virtuous Man) is a 1983 Indian Telugu-language drama film directed by Bairisetty Bhaskara Rao and produced by K. Kesava Rao. The film stars Krishnam Raju and Jayasudha. It was remade in Tamil as Nallavanuku Nallavan (1984), in Kannada as Jeevana Chakra and in Hindi as Mera Saathi (both in 1985).

== Cast ==
- Krishnam Raju as Ranganatham
- Jayasudha as Lakshmi
- Gummadi
- Vijayashanti as Shanthi
- Prasad Babu
- Rajesh as Shanthi's husband
- Prabhakara Reddy
- Kakinada Syamala
- Jayamalini
- Anuradha

== Box office ==
The film was a box office success and ran for a hundred days.

== Awards ==
- Nandi Award for Best Actress - Jayasudha
