= Adavi Ramudu (1977 film) =

1977 Indian film by K. Raghavendra Rao

- Theatrical release poster
- Directed by: K. Raghavendra Rao
- Written by: Story: Satya Chitra Unit; Screenplay: K. Raghavendra Rao; Dialogues: Jandhyala
- Produced by: Satyanarayana; Suryanarayana
- Starring: N. T. Rama Rao; Jayaprada; Jayasudha
- Cinematography: A. Vincent
- Edited by: Kotagiri Venkateswara Rao; Kotagiri Gopala Rao
- Music by: K. V. Mahadevan
- Production company: Satya Chitra
- Release date: 28 April 1977
- Running time: 143 mins
- Country: India
- Language: Telugu

Adavi Ramudu (transl. Forest Ramu) is a 1977 Indian Telugu-language action film directed by K. Raghavendra Rao, who also wrote the screenplay. The film stars N. T. Rama Rao, Jayaprada and Jayasudha, with supporting roles played by Nagabhushanam, Satyanarayana, Gummadi and Jaggayya. The film was edited by Kotagiri Venkateswara Rao, with music composed by K. V. Mahadevan and cinematography by A. Vincent.

Released on 28 April 1977, Adavi Ramudu received positive reviews and became an Industry Hit, running for 366 days in theatres. It won the Filmfare Award for Best Film – Telugu and re-established N. T. Rama Rao as a leading star in Telugu cinema. The film was a major breakthrough for director K. Raghavendra Rao, helping him gain prominence in the industry. It was the highest-grossing Telugu film of the 1970s until the record was surpassed by Premabhisekham in 1981.

== Plot ==
Dharma Raju and his son Nagaraju run a smuggling and illegal transport racket of forest produce. Ramu opposes Raju and raises awareness among the villagers to fight against him. Padma, the daughter of the local forest officer, loves Ramu. One tribal lady Chilakamma also loves Ramu as a brother. Dharma Raju takes the help of one Jaggu to send Ramu away from the forest. The second half of the film reveals that Ramu is, in fact, a forest officer in a secret mission to investigate the case of forest affairs. The story finally leads to the arrest of all criminals.

== Cast ==
- N. T. Rama Rao as Ramu
- Jayaprada as Padma
- Jayasudha as Chilakamma
- Nagabhushanam as Dharmaraju
- Satyanarayana as Nagaraju
- Gummadi as Raja Shekaram
- Jaggayya
- Raja Babu as Bheemanna
- Sridhar as Jaggu
- Mallikarjuna Rao
- Mada
- Pandari Bai
- Rama Prabha
- Kavitha
- Baby Rohini as Gowri
- Shivanandakumar as Venkata Reddy

== Soundtrack ==
Adavi Ramudu

Soundtrack album by K. V. Mahadevan
- Released: 1977
- Genre: Feature film soundtrack
- Length: 27:24
- Producer: K. V. Mahadevan

The music was composed by K. V. Mahadevan. Lyrics were written by Veturi. The song "Aaresukoboyi" was recreated for the 2004 Telugu film also titled Adavi Ramudu.

S. No	Song title	Singers	length
1	"Krushi Vunte Manushulu Rushulautaru"	S. P. Balasubrahmanyam	6:07
2	"Ammathodu Abbathodu"	S. P. Balasubrahmanyam, P. Susheela, S. Janaki	4:20
3	"Aaresukoboyi Paaresukunnanu"	S. P. Balasubrahmanyam, P. Susheela	4:17
4	"Ennallakennaallaku Ennellu"	S. P. Balasubrahmanyam, P. Susheela, S. Janaki	4:36
5	"Kuku Kuku Kokilamma"	S. P. Balasubrahmanyam, P. Susheela	4:38
6	"Choodara Choodara"	S. P. Balasubrahmanyam, P. Susheela, S. Janaki	3:29

== Production ==
=== Development ===
The success of Rajkumar's Gandhada Gudi (1972), which had a forest backdrop, inspired N. T. Rama Rao to pursue a similar theme for his next project. After the failure of Prema Bandham (1976), producers Nekkanti Veera Venkata Satyanarayana and Arumilli Suryanarayana of Satya Chitra banner approached Rama Rao to collaborate on Adavi Ramudu. They chose K. Raghavendra Rao, who had just started his directorial career and was familiar to Rama Rao from assisting Kamalakara Kameswara Rao on Pandava Vanavasam (1965). Rama Rao agreed to the project, and Jandhyala was brought in to write the script and dialogues.

=== Casting ===
Jayasudha, who had worked with Raghavendra Rao on Raja (1976), was cast in a significant role, while Jayaprada, a rising star following the success of Siri Siri Muvva (1976), was chosen as the heroine. Sridhar was selected for another important role opposite Jayasudha. Jayasudha was unaware of playing a secondary role until the last minute, but since she had already agreed to do the film, she just went ahead keeping faith in Raghavendra Rao. Despite receiving positive feedback for her performance, she received letters from fans advising her to avoid second-lead roles in future films.

Although Rama Rao had committed to Adavi Ramudu, he was also filming Daana Veera Soora Karna (1977) simultaneously and assured the producers that he would provide bulk dates after completing the latter project. The team proceeded with filming, confident in their cast and crew.

=== Filming ===
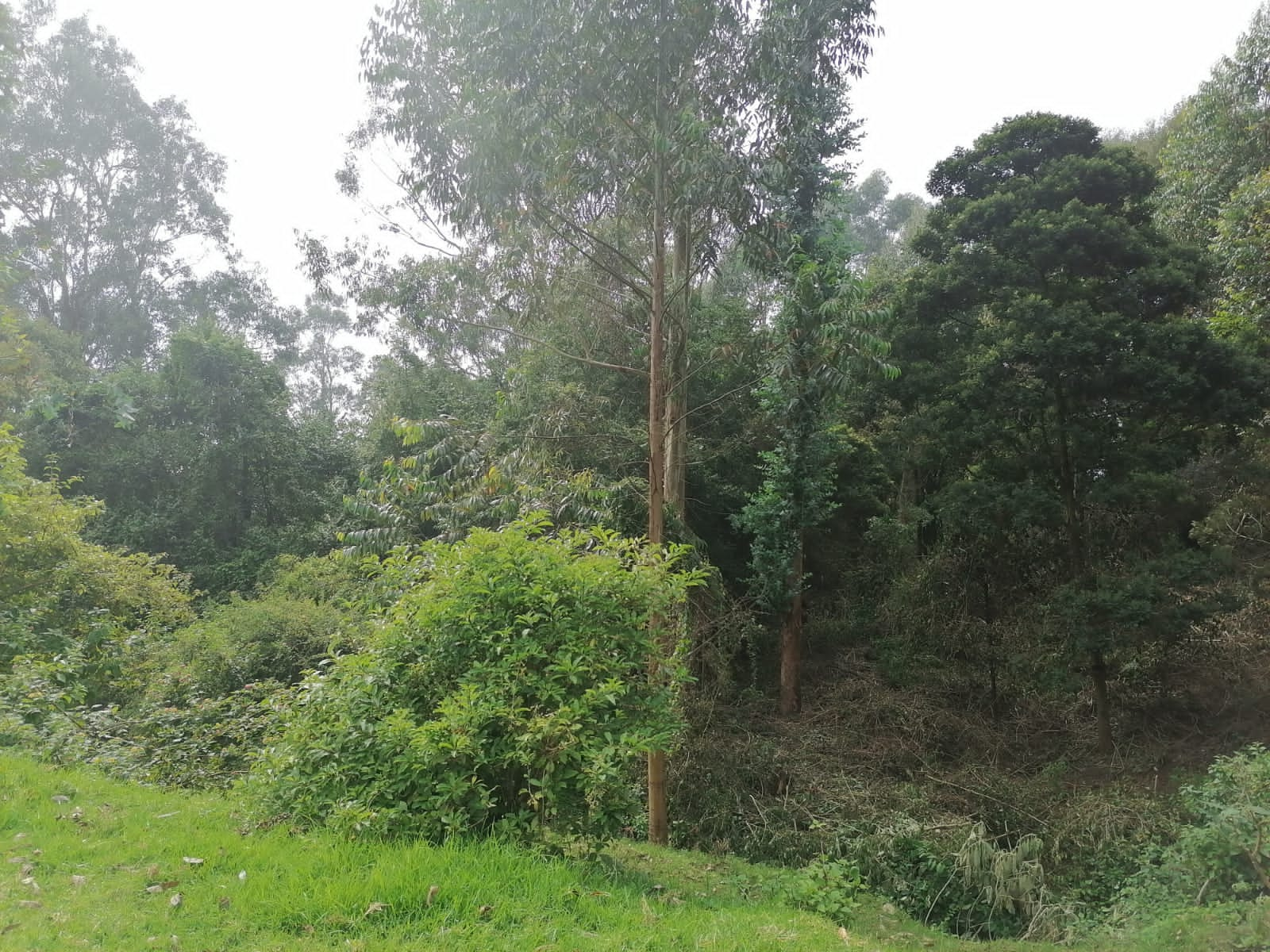
Majority of the film was shot in Madumalai forest.

The majority of the film was shot in the dense Madumalai forest, except for the opening scene, which was filmed in a Madras studio on 9 January 1977. Adavi Ramudu was the first film for which Rama Rao had given dates for more than a month (35 days) outside Madras. It also marked Rama Rao's first colour film shot in Cinemascope, using a special lens imported from Japan. Cinematographer A. Vincent, who had previously worked with Rama Rao on Sontha Vooru (1956), returned to collaborate on this film after a long break.

Due to the remote location, the production team faced logistical challenges. With only three government guesthouses available, they built new accommodations for the 300-member cast and crew, working for 50 days to set up temporary facilities. Supplies had to be transported daily from Mysore, 250 km away.

Jayasudha recalled two accidents during filming. In one instance, both she and Jayaprada were thrown from elephants during a scene when the animals were startled by noise from junior artists. They escaped with minor injuries. In another incident, during a chase sequence, a horse cart axle broke, resulting in injuries for both actresses, requiring them to rest for a few days.

== Release ==
The film was released on 28 April 1977 to positive reviews.

== Reception ==
Adavi Ramudu was a significant box office success, setting multiple records upon its release. It became the first film to collect more than ₹80 lakh in its first 50 days and the first to reach ₹1 crore within 67 days (10 weeks).

The film completed a 100-day run in 32 centers, a 175-day run in 16 centers, and a 200-day run in 8 centers. It ran for 302 days at Apsara Theatre in Vijayawada and achieved a full-year (365-day) run in four centers, including Hyderabad, Vizag, Tirupati, and Vijayawada. Adavi Ramudu was the first Indian film to run for a full year in four centres within a single state, breaking the previous record held by Sholay (1975), which ran for a year in three centers in Maharashtra.

As of 2008, it still held the record for the longest run in Secunderabad, with 161 days of continuous screenings.

== Legacy ==
The film re-brought N. T. Rama Rao into the league of top heroes of the Telugu Film Industry. The success of the film made K. Raghavendra Rao an established director in Telugu Cinema. The title of the film was used for a 2004 film.

== Awards ==
- Filmfare Award for Best Film - Telugu - N. V. V. Satyanarayana (1977)
- Nandi Award for Best Cinematographer - A. Vincent (1977)
