= Samanthipoo =

- Directed by: K. S. Mathangan
- Written by: K. S. Mathangan
- Produced by: A. Rathnam
- Starring: Sivakumar; Shoba
- Cinematography: V. Selvaraj
- Edited by: A. Mohan
- Music by: Malaysia Vasudevan
- Production company: Anand Creations
- Release date: 11 July 1980
- Country: India
- Language: Tamil

Samanthipoo (transl. Chrysanthemum) is a 1980 Indian Tamil-language film written and directed by K. S. Mathangan, starring Sivakumar and Shoba. The film was released on 11 July 1980.

== Cast ==
- Sivakumar as Chidambaram
- Shoba as Sakthi
- Suruli Rajan
- Kumari Raji as Chidambaram's niece
- Sathyaraj as Sakthi's elder brother
- A. R. Srinivasan
- Vijayakanth as Prakash
- S. S. Chandran

== Production ==
Sathyaraj, early in his career, appeared in a small role and had to provide the costumes for the role himself. Vijayakanth, also early in his career, appeared in a small role as a bridegroom for two scenes. The song sequences of the lead actors Sivakumar and Shoba were picturised at a garden of a bungalow belonging to the manager of a tea estate at Coonoor. The film was eighty percent complete when Shoba died by suicide. While producer Rathnam was worried that his money was wasted, editor A. Mohan helped to ensure the film was completed. A woman who looked like Shoba was used and long shots showed her only from the backside. Although the story was originally written with her character marrying her lover, played by Sivakumar, the story was changed to make her consume poison due to her unfulfilled love. Footage of Shoba's real funeral was shown in the film as her character's funeral.

== Soundtrack ==
The soundtrack was composed by Malaysia Vasudevan. It is his first film as composer.

Track listing
No.	Title	Lyrics	Singer(s)	Length
1.	"Maalai Velai"	Pulamaipithan	S. P. Balasubrahmanyam, S. P. Sailaja
2.	"Kanavugale"	Gangai Amaran	S. Janaki
3.	"Kadavulai Nenaichu"	Kamakodiyan	Malaysia Vasudevan, S. P. Sailaja, Saibaba
4.	"Aagayam Bhoomi"	Pulamaipithan	Malaysia Vasudevan

== Release and reception ==
The film was released two months after Shoba's demise and also released a week later after another Shoba starrer Ponnagaram. Kanthan of Kalki appreciated Suruli Rajan's comedy, Selvaraj's cinematography and Vasudevan's music.
