= Vijay Babu =

Vijay Babu may refer to:

- Vijay Babu (actor, born 1976), Actor, Producer in Malayalam film industry
- Vijay Babu (actor, born 1951), Actor, Producer in Tamil film Industry
