= Raghupathi Raghavan Rajaram =

- Theatrical release poster
- Directed by: Durai
- Screenplay by: Durai
- Story by: Ram–Rahim
- Produced by: S. Leelavathi
- Starring: Vijayakumar; Rajinikanth; Kutty Padmini; Sumithra
- Music by: Shankar–Ganesh
- Production company: Sri Uma Chitra
- Release date: 12 August 1977
- Country: India
- Language: Tamil

Raghupathi Raghavan Rajaram (/rəɡʊpəθi rɑːɡəvən rɑːdʒɑːrɑːm/) is a 1977 Indian Tamil-language film directed by Durai, starring Vijayakumar, Rajinikanth and Sumithra. The film was released on 12 August 1977, and did not do well at the box office. It is considered a lost film.

== Cast ==
- Vijayakumar as Inspector Raghupathi
- Rajinikanth as Veeraiyan
- Sumithra
- Kutty Padmini

== Soundtrack ==
The music was composed by Shankar–Ganesh, with lyrics written by Vaali.

Track listing
No.	Title	Singer(s)	Length
1.	"Thanga Therodum"	S. P. Balasubrahmanyam, P. Susheela
2.	"Kathazhang Kattukulle"	S. C. Krishnan
3.	"Raghupathi Raghava Rajaram"	P. Susheela

== Critical reception ==
Anna praised the acting of the star cast, cinematography and Durai's direction.
