= Pasi (film) =

- Theatrical release poster
- Directed by: Durai
- Written by: Durai
- Produced by: G. Lalitha
- Starring: Shoba; Vijayan; Delhi Ganesh
- Cinematography: V. Ranga
- Edited by: M. Vellaichamy
- Music by: Shankar–Ganesh
- Production company: Sunitha Cine Arts
- Release date: 21 December 1979
- Country: India
- Language: Tamil

Pasi (/pəsi/ transl. Hunger) is a 1979 Indian Tamil-language drama film written and directed by Durai. It stars Shoba, Vijayan and Delhi Ganesh. The film, released on 21 December 1979, won two awards each at the National Film Awards, the Tamil Nadu State Film Awards, and the Filmfare Awards South. It was remade in Hindi by the same director as Pet Pyaar Aur Paap (1984).

== Plot ==
Muniyandi, a cycle-rickshaw puller, is a road-side dweller along with his wife Valliamma and their seven children – two daughters and five sons. Despite being the sole breadwinner of his family, Muniyandi spends the majority of his meager earnings on liquor. His wife struggles to make ends meet with the remaining amount. Her friend Rakkamma, a street food vendor, lends financial support to Valliamma's family.

The educated Krishna, one of Muniyandi's sons, elopes with a girl and separates himself from the family. Muniyandi's daughter Kuppamma, along with her friend Chellamma contribute a small income to the family by picking up rags on the roads. Rangan, a lorry driver, befriends Kuppamma and offers assistance to her whenever she is in need of any help. They both get close to each other, and their friendship leads to a physical relationship. When Valliamma gets to know this, she commits suicide, fearing that Kuppamma's act has brought disgrace to the family.

Meanwhile, Kuppamma gets shocked when she learns that Rangan is already married. With the intention of not disclosing Rangan's identity, she keeps herself away from him. During this time, Kuppamma finds out that she's pregnant. Despite the advice of fellow road-side dwellers to abort the child, she refuses to do so. She also protects Rangan's identity by informing her relatives that her lover died in an accident.

Knowing that she is about to deliver their child, Kuppamma wishes to meet Rangan. But Rangan had relocated to another locality after she turned down his support. When Rangan's wife gets to know about the relationship, she empathises with Kuppamma and insists that Rangan bring her to their home. When Rangan reaches the slum, he finds Kuppamma in the throes of labour pain. Kuppamma dies soon after, upon delivering their child. Rangan and his wife then decide to adopt the child as penance for Rangan's sins.

== Cast ==
- Shoba as Kuppamma
- Vijayan as Rangan
- Delhi Ganesh as Muniyandi
- Senthil as Aarumugam
- Praveena Bhagyaraj as Roopa
- Tambaram Lalitha as Valliamma
- S. N. Parvathy as Rakkamma
- Sathya as Chellamma
- Narayanan as Sound Kannaiya
- I. S. Ramachandran as a common man
- Jayabharathi as Gowri
- Suruli Rajan as Beggar / Rickshaw Owner

Guest appearance

- Kamal Haasan as himself

== Production ==
Durai, then known for making commercial films, made Pasi in a realistic manner by compromising on commercial aspects such as songs and dance sequences. The background score was composed by Shankar–Ganesh. The Government of Tamil Nadu provided a subsidy of ₹ 100,000 for the film. The filming was held at slum-dwelling areas at Chennai.

== Release and reception ==
Released on 21 December 1979, the film met with unanimous critical acclaim. It was equally successful at the box-office, running for more than 100 days in the theatres. In 1984, Durai remade the film in Hindi as Pet Pyaar Aur Paap.

A review from the Tamil magazine Ananda Vikatan, dated 13 January 1980, appreciated the film for its realistic depiction of the lives of the poor. It also praised Shobha's acting and Ranga's camerawork. Durai's script and dialogues received equal praise but the end credits of the film were criticised as it was considered as not being appropriate to the characters of the film. Kausigan of Kalki praised the story that makes you feel as if you are standing and watching the real life of the slum dwellers, the natural dialogues and the excellent direction of Durai and Ranga, who has skillfully navigated every corner of the slum with his camera, are worthy of praise and concluded the film satisfies the mind. Naagai Dharuman of Anna praised the performances, cinematography and dialogues. The same year it was screened at the Tashkent Film Festival.

The film served as a launchpad for Senthil, who would later go onto establish himself as one of the popular comedians in Tamil cinema in the 1980s. Another debutante Sathya, who played Shobha's friend Chellamma, acquired the prefix "Pasi" after the film.

Shortly after receiving the Best Actress award at the 27th National Film Awards and a day before the 100th day celebration of the film's success, Shobha committed suicide by hanging herself at her residence in Madras (now Chennai).

== Accolades ==
National Film Awards

- 1980 – Silver Lotus Award – Best Actress – Shoba
- 1980 – National Film Award for Best Feature Film in Tamil

Filmfare Awards South

- 1979 – Best Tamil Film (Durai)
- 1979 – Best Tamil Actress (Shobha)

Tamil Nadu State Film Awards

- 1980 – Best Film (first prize) (G. Lalitha)
- 1980 – Special Prize for Best Actor (Delhi Ganesh)

== See also ==
- List of Indian films without songs

== Bibliography ==
- Dhananjayan, G. (2014). Pride of Tamil Cinema: 1931–2013. Blue Ocean Publishers. OCLC 898765509.
- Rangan, Baradwaj (2014). Dispatches from the Wall Corner : A Journey through Indian Cinema. Tranquebar Press, Westland Ltd. ISBN 978-9384030568.
