= Kinnaram =

- Directed by: Sathyan Anthikkad
- Written by: Dr. Balakrishnan
- Screenplay by: Dr. Balakrishnan
- Starring: Sukumaran; Poornima Jayaram; Nedumudi Venu; Jagathi Sreekumar
- Cinematography: Anandakuttan
- Edited by: G. Venkittaraman
- Music by: Raveendran
- Production company: Pratheeksha Productions
- Distributed by: Pratheeksha Productions
- Release date: 8 July 1983
- Country: India
- Language: Malayalam

Kinnaram is a 1983 Malayalam comedy film directed by Sathyan Anthikkad. The film is the story of two bachelor friends who fall in love with the same girl. The film stars Nedumudi Venu, Sukumaran and Poornima Jayaram in the lead roles.

== Plot ==
Unni and Sethu are two bachelor friends staying together in Madras. Though irritating at sometimes, with his music talents, the house owner Varma, a music director is always ready to financially support them at times. One day, Unni gets a letter from his father, asking him to receive Radha, daughter of his friend who will be arriving at Madras to join at a company for a job. At the railway station, both Unni and Sethu fall for her and both try all methods to woo her. Radha is accommodated at the house of Mary, a colleague of theirs, who is also a sister-like figure for them. As she approached late after the joining date, Radha is denied the job. Sethu introduces her to V.N Das, his manager, also a womanizer and gets her a job at his company. This creates a friction in the friendship between Unni and Sethu. Both, but fails to express their feelings to her, instead fight each other bitterly over issues, leading even to physically attacking each other. One day Radha introduces them to Balachandran, whom she addresses as her fiancé and asks them both to attend her wedding without fail. Realizing their foolishness, Sethu and Unni patch up and reaches back home happily. But at home, Sethu gets a letter from his father informing the arrival of the daughter of one of his friends in Madras. Both rush to the railway station to pick her up.

== Cast ==
- Sukumaran as Sethu
- Poornima Jayaram as Radha
- Nedumudi Venu as Unni
- Jagathi Sreekumar as Varma
- Mala Aravindan as Raja Manikyam
- Sankaradi as V N Das
- Sukumari as Rosi
- Bahadoor as Charlie
- Meena as Mrs. Das
- Mammootty as Balachandran (Guest Appearance)

== Soundtrack ==
The music was composed by Raveendran and lyrics was written by Sathyan Anthikkad. Jagathi Sreekumar who played the role of Varmaji, a small-time music composer at Madras, has penned four songs for the film, which he sings in many scenes of the movie. The song "Pistah Suma Kira" was remixed as a promotional song for the 2013 movie, Neram. It was also selected as the promo of IPL 2016. The other songs penned by Jagathy are "Otta Pathrathil", "Vaa Kuruvi" and "Aruthe".

No.	Song	Singers	Lyrics	Length (m:ss)
1	"Hridaya Sakhi Nee Arikil Varoo"	K. J. Yesudas	Sathyan Anthikkad	
2	"Kinnaaram"	Chorus, Lathika	Sathyan Anthikkad	
