= Oomakkuyil =

- Promotional poster designed by P. N. Menon
- Directed by: Balu Mahendra
- Produced by: Joseph Abraham
- Starring: Y. Gee. Mahendra; Aruna; Poornima Jayaram
- Cinematography: Balu Mahendra
- Edited by: D. Vasu
- Music by: Ilaiyaraaja
- Production company: Prakkattu Films
- Distributed by: Prakkattu Films
- Release date: 19 August 1983
- Country: India
- Language: Malayalam

Ooma Kuyil is a 1983 Indian Malayalam-language film directed by Balu Mahendra and produced by Joseph Abraham. The film stars Y. Gee. Mahendra, Aruna and Poornima Jayaram. It is a remake of the director's Kannada film Kokila.

== Plot ==
Oomakkuyil is the story a bank executive and his affair with the daughter of his house owner. As their relationship goes smoothly a dark day happens in the life of the bank executive and his house maid, which turns everyone's dream upside down.

== Cast ==
- Y. G. Mahendran
- Poornima Jayaram as Radha
- Aruna
- Adoor Bhasi
- Jagathy Sreekumar
- Baby Shalini

== Production ==
After Kamal Haasan refused to reprise his role from Kokila, he was replaced with Y. G. Mahendran.

== Soundtrack ==
The music was composed by Ilaiyaraaja with lyrics by Madhu Alappuzha and O. N. V. Kurup.

Song	Singers	Lyrics
"Chakravaala Visaalatha"	K. J. Yesudas	Madhu Alappuzha
"Kaatte Kaatte"	S. Janaki, P. Jayachandran, Krishnachandran	O. N. V. Kurup
"Ormakalaay Koode Varoo"	K. J. Yesudas, S. Janaki	O. N. V. Kurup
"Thaazhampoothaali Nin"	S. Janaki	O. N. V. Kurup
"Thaazhampoothaali Nin" (Pathos)	S. Janaki	O. N. V. Kurup
"Thazhampoo Thaalil Njan" (Pathos Bit)	S. Janaki	O. N. V. Kurup
