= Radhika (singer) =

Indian playback singer in Telugu cinema (1970–2017)

Radhika రాధిక
- Born: 1970; Tirupati, Andhra Pradesh, India
- Died: 10 November 2017 (aged 46–47) Chennai, Tamil Nadu, India
- Genres: Playback singer; item numbers
- Occupation: Singer
- Years active: 1980s–2014

Radhika (1970 – 10 November 2017) was an Indian playback singer known for her contributions to Telugu cinema. She recorded over 200 songs in various South Indian languages, including Telugu, Tamil, and Kannada. Radhika is particularly recognized for singing item numbers in commercial films.

She gained prominence with her iconic song "Bavalu Sayya... Maradallu Sayya" from the film Bava Bavamaridi (1993), which became a significant hit. Other notable tracks include "Aata Kavala," "Amalapuram Bulloda," and "Sunnunda Theesuko." Despite a successful career, she did not achieve widespread recognition.

== Early life and career ==
Radhika was born in Tirupati, Andhra Pradesh. She was the niece of Telugu actor and former Member of Parliament Siva Prasad.

Radhika started her career as a playback singer in the late 1980s and became known in the South Indian music industry, especially in Telugu cinema. Her breakthrough came with the hit song "Bavalu Sayya... Maradallu Sayya". She later contributed to many successful songs, especially item numbers in the 1990s and early 2000s.

She took a step back from the music industry in 2004 and distanced herself from the limelight. She faced serious health challenges, including a kidney disorder, and had been under medical treatment since 2014.

== Death ==
Radhika died on 10 November 2017 at the age of 47 due to a heart attack at a private hospital in Chennai. Her death was mourned by music directors Koti and Mani Sharma, and singer Mano.

== Discography ==
Radhika lent her voice to several Telugu and South Indian films. Some of her key songs include:

Year	Film	Language	Song	Music director	Ref.
1991	Rowdy Alludu	Telugu	"Amalapuram Bulloda"	Bappi Lahiri	
1992	Appula Appa Rao	Telugu	"Rambhaho Ho Ho Ho"	Rajan–Nagendra	
1993	Bava Bavamaridi	Telugu	"Bavalu Sayya... Maradallu Sayya"	Raj–Koti	
1994	Kishkindha Kanda	Telugu	"Emananti"	M. M. Keeravani	
1994	Bobbili Simham	Telugu	"Mayadari Pillada"	M. M. Keeravani	
2000	Annayya	Telugu	"Aata Kavala"	Mani Sharma	
2001	Narasimha Naidu	Telugu	"Chilakapacha Koka"	Mani Sharma	
2001	Shahjahan	Tamil	"Sarakku Vechuruken"	Mani Sharma	
2002	Aadi	Telugu	"Sunnunda Theesuko"	Mani Sharma	
2004	Anji	Telugu	"Mirapakaya Bajji"	Mani Sharma	
