= Kuruthykkalam =

- Directed by: A. K. Sahadevan
- Written by: C. .G Gopinath
- Screenplay by: C. G. Gopinath
- Produced by: M. Surendran
- Starring: Sathyan; Madhu; Sheela; Shobha
- Cinematography: S. S. Nathan
- Edited by: K. Narayanan
- Music by: Jaya Vijaya
- Production company: Cine United
- Distributed by: Cine United
- Release date: 23 August 1969
- Country: India
- Language: Malayalam

Kuruthykkalam is a 1969 Indian Malayalam film, directed by A. K. Sahadevan. The film stars Sathyan, Madhu, Sheela and Shobha in the lead roles. The film had musical score by Jaya Vijaya.

== Cast ==
- Sathyan
- Madhu
- Sheela
- Shobha
- Abbas
- Ambili
- Bahadoor
- Kottayam Chellappan
- Nithya
- K. S. Parvathy
- S. P. Pillai

== Soundtrack ==
The music was composed by Jaya Vijaya and the lyrics were written by P. Bhaskaran.

No.	Song	Singers	Lyrics	Length (m:ss)
1	"Entharinju Maniveena"	P. Susheela	P. Bhaskaran	
2	"Kaalamoru Kaalavandi"	K. J. Yesudas	P. Bhaskaran	
3	"Kazhinja Sambhavangal"	K. J. Yesudas	P. Bhaskaran	
4	"Virunnorukkee"	S. Janaki	P. Bhaskaran	
