= Oru Veedu Oru Ulagam =

1978 film by Durai

- Title card
- Directed by: Durai
- Screenplay by: Durai
- Story by: G. Lalitha
- Produced by: B. Dass; Raghunath R.
- Starring: Srikanth; Shoba
- Cinematography: Rangan
- Edited by: R. Devan
- Music by: M. S. Viswanathan
- Production company: Movie International
- Release date: 1 December 1978
- Running time: 130 minutes
- Country: India
- Language: Tamil

Oru Veedu Oru Ulagam (transl. One House, One World) is a 1978 Indian Tamil-language drama film directed and written by Durai from a story by G. Lalitha. The film stars Srikanth and Shoba, with Major Sundarrajan, Delhi Ganesh, Suruli Rajan, Pandari Bai and Vijay Babu in supporting roles. It was released on 1 December 1978, and Durai won the Tamil Nadu State Film Award for Best Director.

== Plot ==
Gowri is the daughter of a piously Brahmin household. She has to overcome considerable parental resistance to be allowed access to higher education. Her respect for her divorced professor is misunderstood by some, resulting in her father wanting to discontinue her studies. But she is rescued by marrying Murali, who happens to be her father's friend ARK's son. ARK and Murali are forward in their outlook and Gowri has a wonderful marriage. But when her husband is accidentally drowned, her parents insist on her leading the austere and repressed life of a widow. However, ARK intervenes and manages to get his daughter-in-law remarried.

== Cast ==
- Srikanth as Amalraj
- Shoba as Gowri
- Major Sundarrajan as ARK
- Delhi Ganesh as the Gurukkal
- Pandari Bai
- Suruli Rajan
- Vijay Babu as Murali

== Production ==
Oru Veedu Oru Ulagam was directed by Durai and produced by Dass and Raghunath under the banner Movie International. The screenplay was written by Durai and the dialogues by Vietnam Veedu Sundaram from a story by G. Lalitha.

== Soundtrack ==
The soundtrack was composed by M. S. Viswanathan.

Track listing
No.	Title	Lyrics	Singer(s)	Length
1.	"Rathi Devi Sannidhiyil"	Pulamaipithan	T. L. Maharajan, B. S. Sasirekha
2.	"Vandanam Vandanam"	Vaali	Kovai Soundararajan, L. R. Eswari
3.	"Kumbakonam Kozhunthu"	Alangudi Somu	L. R. Eswari

== Bibliography ==
- Rajadhyaksha, Ashish; Willemen, Paul (1998) [1994]. Encyclopaedia of Indian Cinema. British Film Institute and Oxford University Press. ISBN 0-19-563579-5.
