= Sadhurangam (1978 film) =

1978 film by Durai

- Theatrical release poster
- Directed by: Durai
- Screenplay by: K. A. Nadarajan
- Based on: Bharatha Matharkku Jai by Visu
- Produced by: N. Chandra
- Starring: Rajinikanth; Srikanth; Jayachitra; Prameela
- Cinematography: V. Manohar
- Edited by: N. Umananth; Mani
- Music by: V. Kumar
- Production company: Chandra Arts
- Release date: 23 June 1978
- Running time: 128 minutes
- Country: India
- Language: Tamil

Sadhurangam (transl. Chess) is a 1978 Indian Tamil-language film directed by Durai. The film stars Rajinikanth, Srikanth, Jayachitra and Prameela, with Thengai Srinivasan, V. K. Ramasamy and Pandari Bai in supporting roles. It is based on Visu's play Bharatha Matharkku Jai. The film was released on 23 June 1978. It is a partially lost film.

== Plot ==
A middle class Orthodox Brahmin family mother (Pandari Bai) has two sons, Sundaresan and Ram Kumar. Both sons love their mother. Sundaresan works as an accountant. He is a straightforward and sincerely quiet man, so his colleagues tease him. Younger brother Ram Kumar studied at a college, but he is arrogant and misbehaves with the college girls and teases professors. He comes to class irregularly and is not interested in his studies. Thengai Srinivasan is a widower, son-in-law of Pandari Bai and uncle of Sundaresan and Ram Kumar. He has a sister named Meenakshi. She dreams of marrying a rich man, but they ask for much dowry. Finally, Pandari Bai decides Meenakshi should marry elder son Sundaresan. Uma is a bold girl. Sambantham is interested in her. Sambantham was to give a love letter to Uma, but Uma and her friends was racked and Sambantham complained to his friend Ram Kumar. Ram Kumar and Sambantham come to Sheriff Iyer's house and complain to his daughter Uma. She was foe of Ram Kumar. Uma did not respect Ram Kumar's complaint, So Ram told his friend Sambantham to forgot his love. The next day, Ram Kumar spoils both their names writing badly on the college compound wall about Uma. The rumour spread to the entire college. So, Uma decides to marry him. Uma and her father come to Ram Kumar's house and tell lies to his mother, that Ram Kumar and Uma love each other. Pandari Bai makes Ram Kumar tie "Thali". Uma is a rich girl and daughter of Sheriff Iyer. So, Meenakshi becomes jealous of Uma. After Ram Kumar's marriage, Sundaresan's behaviour toward his wife Meenakshi changes. Sundaresan goes on the wrong path and works illegally for Soma Sudaram. Ram Kumar was dismissed from college, so he was not able to take an exam. So, Ram works as house broker and with his salary, buys gifts for his family members except Uma, because he must avoid her. Ram Kumar hated his wife Uma. But Uma tries to get her husband into high positions and corrects for his bad behaviours. Ram was changed totally and looks like a new man. Meenakshi and Uma go to the temple and Masilamani (V. Gopalakrishnan) met Meenakshi, gives her some files and told her it was corrected Sudaresan for immediately. Uma heard the news and she found the hidden secrets of Sundaresan and told her mother-in-law Pandari Bai. Pandari Bai was angry with her son Sundaresan and requested he leave the illegal work. But Meenakshi argues with her mother-in-law and decides to go to a neutral family and come from a new house. Sundaresan's activities go badly, he often drank, smoked and went to nightclubs. And he did not spend time with his wife. Then, Ram Kumar accepted Uma heart and soul, and their life became calm and happy. Meenakshi awakens Sundaresan, but he is not steady. Sundaresan was heavily drinking and went to bed. Then Ram Kumar did the ritual event. Finally, Sundaresan feels for his mother's death, goes to the police station, admits his illegal activities and surrenders.

== Cast ==
- Rajinikanth as Sundaresan
- Srikanth as Ramkumar
- Jayachitra as Uma (Ramkumar's wife)
- Prameela as Meenakshi (Sundaresan's wife)
- V. K. Ramasamy as Sheriff Iyer (Uma's father)
- Pandari Bai as Sundaresan and Ram Kumar's mother
- Thengai Srinivasan as Meenakshi's brother
- V. Gopalakrishanan as Masilamani
- S. V. Ramadoss as Somasundaram
- Y. G. Mahendran as Sambantham (Ram's friend)
- Halam makes a special appearance in the song "Aarambham"
- L. Kanchana as Kanchana
- T. K. S. Natarajan as Sheriff Iyer's housekeeper
- K. Kannan as Kannan
- Ravi as Tenant (uncredited)

== Soundtrack ==
The music was composed by V. Kumar and lyrics were written by Vaali. The song "Madhanorchavam" became popular.

Song	Singer	Length
"Madhanorchavam"	S. P. Balasubrahmanyam, Vani Jayaram	4.25
"Ada Abishtu"	P. Susheela, K. Swarna	3:15
"Aarambham"	S. Janaki, L. R. Eswari and Chorus	3:20

== Reception ==
P. S. M. of Kalki praised the acting of Rajinikanth, Pandari Bai, V. K. Ramasamy and Thengai Srinivasan and added some of the emotional phases from the film thrill us however the raw dialogues make us swoon.

== Legacy ==
Visu later directed a film Thirumathi Oru Vegumathi (1987) based on the same play.
