= Avalum Penn Thaane =

1974 film by Durai

- Poster
- Directed by: Durai
- Written by: Durai
- Produced by: Pandari Bai
- Starring: Sumithra; R. Muthuraman; M. R. R. Vasu; Pandari Bai
- Cinematography: Manohar
- Edited by: M. Umanath
- Music by: V. Kumar
- Production company: Sri Panduranga Productions
- Release date: 13 December 1974
- Running time: 164 minutes
- Country: India
- Language: Tamil

Avalum Penn Thaane (transl. She Too Is A Woman) is a 1974 Indian Tamil-language film written and directed by Durai in his directorial debut. The film stars Sumithra, R. Muthuraman and M. R. R. Vasu. It received critical acclaim and became a commercial success.

== Cast ==
- Sumithra as Sita
- R. Muthuraman as Muthu
- M. R. R. Vasu as Seetha's pimp
- S. V. Sahasranamam as Uma's father
- Pandari Bai as Muthu's mother
- Thengai Srinivasan
- V. K. Ramasamy
- K. R. Indira Devi as Ruku
- Manorama
- S. V. Ramadas
- M. N. Rajam as Subbu
- Mynavathi
- Rama Prabha as Uma
- Gandhimathi as Ponnamma

== Production ==
Avalum Penn Thaane is the directorial debut of Durai who also wrote the screenplay. It was produced by Pandari Bai, under the banner Sri Panduranga Productions. She also acted in the film as the mother of R. Muthuraman's character. Sumithra made her acting debut in this film, portraying a prostitute. The film had cinematography by Manohar, and it was edited by M. Umanath. Shooting took place at Vikram and Vasu Studios. The inspiration for the concept came when Durai who during his days as an assistant director was in a shoot at Mysore where he witnessed a group of prostitutes looking at the crew scouting for a chance to which Durai felt sympathy for them and this formed a basis for Avalum Penn Thaane. Despite Durai wanting to give the film a happy ending, distributors were adamant that by having the conclusion of a girl starting a new life afresh after marriage would be rejected by audience so Durai unwillingly ended the film in its final manner.

== Music ==
The music was composed by V. Kumar, and the lyrics were written by Vaali. The playback singers were S. P. Balasubrahmanyam, P. Susheela and K. Jamuna Rani. There were only two songs in the film.

== Reception ==
Avalum Penn Thaane was a critical and commercial success. Kanthan of Kalki praised the performances of Muthuraman, Sumithra, M. R. R. Vasu and noted that hundred marks should be given to the dialogues written by Durai, he called the film as daringly fabricated picture and concluded that this A certified film is given A one certificate by fans due to the support of acting and direction.
