= Durai (director) =

Indian film director (1940–2024)

- Born: J.F.C. Durai; 25 February 1940
- Died: 22 April 2024 (aged 84); Tiruninravur, Chennai district, Tamil Nadu, India
- Occupations: Film director, screenwriter, editor
- Website: directordurai.net

J.F.C. Durai (25 February 1940 – 22 April 2024) was an Indian film director who was mostly active during the 1970s. As of 2014, he had directed 46 films in Tamil, Telugu, Kannada, Malayalam and Hindi. Though known for his work in commercial cinema, he made women-centric films like Avalum Penthaane and Pasi, which won two National Film Awards. He served as a jury member of the 58th National Film Awards (India) in 2011. As of 2011, he was the vice president of the South Indian Film Writers' Association.

Born on 25 February 1940, Durai died on 22 April 2024, at the age of 84.

== Partial filmography ==
- Pennin Perumai (1956) as sound engineer
- Avalum Penn Thaane (1974)
- Oru Kudumbathin Kathai (1975)
- Aasai 60 Naal (1976)
- Mugiyada Kathe (1976) (Kannada)
- Raghupathi Raghavan Rajaram (1977)
- Paavathin Sambalam (1978)
- Oru Veedu Oru Ulagam (1978)
- Sadhurangam (1978)
- Aayiram Jenmangal (1978)
- Pasi (1979)
- Oli Pirandhadhu (1979)
- Neeya? (1979)
- Porkaalam (1980)
- Maria My Darling (1980) (also in Kannada)
- Aval Oru Kaviyam (1981)
- Mayil (1981)
- Thani Maram (1981)
- Kilinjalgal (1981)
- Thunai (1982)
- Velicham Vitharunna Penkutty (1982) (Malayalam)
- Do Gulaab (1983) (Hindi)
- Pet Pyaar Aur Paap (1984) (Hindi)
- Veli (1985)
- Oru Manithan Oru Manaivi (1986)
- Palaivanathil Pattampoochi (1988)
- Pudhiya Athiyayam (1990)

== Awards ==
- 1978 – Tamil Nadu State Film Award for Best Director – Oru Veedu Oru Ulagam
- 1979 – National Film Award for Best Feature Film in Tamil – Pasi
- 1979 - Filmfare Award for Best Film - Tamil - Pasi
- 1980 – Best Film Award for Pasi at Tashkent Film Festival
- 1982 – Kalaimamani
