= Ponnagaram =

- Title card
- Directed by: K. S. Madhangan
- Written by: K. S. Madhangan
- Produced by: K. Raja
- Starring: Sarath Babu; Shoba
- Cinematography: A. V. Ramakrishnan
- Edited by: Vellaichami
- Music by: Shankar–Ganesh
- Production company: True Films
- Release date: 4 July 1980
- Country: India
- Language: Tamil

Ponnagaram is a 1980 Indian Tamil-language film written and directed by K. S. Madhangan in his debut. The film stars Sarath Babu and Shoba. It was released on 4 July 1980, two months after Shoba's death.

== Cast ==
- Sarath Babu as Raja
- Shoba as Bhavani
- Suruli Rajan as Mayil Vahanam
- Sachu as Muthukannu
- Sri Kumar
- I. Lavanya
- V. S. Raghavan as Bhavani's father
- M. N. Rajam as Bhavani's mother
- S. V. Ramadas

== Production ==
Ponnagaram is the directorial debut of Madhangan. The title of the film is a reference to a short story of the same name by Pulamaipithan.

== Soundtrack ==
The music was composed by Shankar–Ganesh. The film marks lyricist Kamakodiyan's debut.

Track listing
No.	Title	Lyrics	Singer(s)	Length
1.	"Muthu Rathamo Mullai"	Sulthan	Vani Jairam, P. Jayachandran
2.	"Chithada Muthu Kannu"	Kamakodiyan	S. Janaki, Malaysia Vasudevan
3.	"Deyaandoe"	Kamakodiyan	S. Janaki, Chorus
4.	"Irupavarukku"	Kamakodiyan	K. J. Yesudas

== Reception ==
P. S. M. of Kalki felt Madhangan gave himself work overload by handling both writing and directing, and criticised him for trying to capitalise on Shoba's death.
