= Jayakrishna =

Indian film producer

- Died: Hyderabad
- Occupation: Producer
- Awards: Filmfare Awards South

Jayakrishna was an Indian film producer known for his work in Telugu cinema. He is best known for producing Mana Voori Pandavulu (1978), which won the Filmfare Award for Best Film – Telugu. His other notable films include Sita Ramulu (1980), Krishnarjunulu (1982), Manthri Gari Viyyankudu (1983), Muddula Manavaralu (1985), Raga Leela (1987), Vivaha Bhojanambu (1988), Neekoo Naakoo Pellanta (1988), and 420 (1992).

== Career ==
Jayakrishna began his career in the film industry as a makeup artist. He worked as the personal makeup artist for Telugu actors Krishnam Raju and Vijayashanti. Notably, A. M. Rathnam, who later became a producer, was one of his students during his makeup career. Jayakrishna is recognized as the first producer to pay a remuneration to actor Chiranjeevi, offering him ₹1116. He also established production banners such as Muddu Art Movies and Jayakrishna Movies.

== Filmography ==
- Krishnaveni (1974)
- Bhakta Kannappa (1976)
- Amara Deepam (1977)
- Mana Voori Pandavulu (1978)
- Sita Ramulu (1980)
- Krishnarjunulu (1982)
- Mantri Gari Viyyankudu (1983)
- Seethamma Pelli (1984)
- Muddula Manavaralu (1985)
- Sravanthi (1985)
- Jackie (1985)
- Vivaha Bandham (1986)
- Mister Bharat (1986)
- Raga Leela (1987)
- Vivaha Bhojanambu (1988)
- Neekoo Naakoo Pellanta (1988)
- 420 (1992)
- Dasu (2001)

== Awards ==
1978 – Filmfare Award for Best Film – Telugu – Mana Voori Pandavulu
