= Veli (film) =

- Title card
- Directed by: Durai
- Produced by: G. Lalitha
- Starring: Saritha; Rajesh; Sumithra; Sathyaraj
- Music by: Shankar–Ganesh
- Release date: 24 July 1985
- Country: India
- Language: Tamil

Veli (pronounced [ʋeːli] transl. Fence) is a 1985 Indian Tamil-language film directed by Durai, starring Saritha and Rajesh. It was released on 24 July 1985.

== Cast ==
- Saritha
- Rajesh
- Sumithra
- Sathyaraj
- Jaishankar

== Soundtrack ==
The music was composed by Shankar–Ganesh.

Track listing
| No. | Title | Lyrics | Singer(s) | Length |
|---|---|---|---|---|
| 1. | "Kaali! Bhadrakali" | Vaali | Vani Jairam, Poonguyilan |
| 2. | "Kanna Kanmanikku" | Poonguyilan | P. Susheela |
| 3. | "Devi En Devi" | Muthulingam | P. Jayachandran, Vani Jairam |
| 4. | "Kiss Me" | Muthulingam | Manjula |

== Reception ==
Jayamanmadhan of Kalki praised the performances of Rajesh, Sathyaraj and the film's message but felt the film was dragged in second half and concluded it felt like a series that was supposed to end in ten weeks but dragged for 17–18 weeks. Balumani of Anna praised the acting of cast, music and direction. According to Rajesh, the film failed because of the characterisation of his character.
