= Paavathin Sambalam =

- Directed by: Durai
- Written by: Durai
- Produced by: G. V. Rajamma
- Starring: R. Muthuraman; Prameela; Sumithra
- Cinematography: Meenakshi Sundaram
- Edited by: Umanath
- Music by: Shankar–Ganesh
- Production company: G. V. R. Combines
- Release date: 9 December 1978
- Country: India
- Language: Tamil

Paavathin Sambalam (transl. The Wages of Sin) is a 1978 Indian Tamil-language film written and directed by Durai. The film stars R. Muthuraman, Prameela and Sumithra. It was released on 9 December 1978.

== Cast ==
- R. Muthuraman as David
- Prameela as Rosy
- Sumithra as Stella
- Jayachandran
- M. N. Nambiar
- Master Sekhar
- Rajbabu
- Rajinikanth as Kathiravan (guest appearance)
- Suruli Rajan
- Lalitha Mani
- Manorama

== Production ==
Paavathin Sambalam is the first film produced by G. V. R. Combines.

== Soundtrack ==
The music was composed by Shankar–Ganesh, with lyrics by Alangudi Somu.

Track listing
No.	Title	Singer(s)	Length
1.	"Annai Mary Unnaiyandri Aarudhalai"	P. Susheela
2.	"Raave Raave"	S. P. Balasubrahmanyam, Manorama
3.	"Sirithathu Podhum"	T. M. Soundararajan, Prameela

== Release and reception ==
Paavathin Sambalam was released on 9 December 1978. P. S. M. of Kalki said the story had many disgusting and confusing moments, and that Durai carried three big burdens: story, dialogues and direction, but did a good job without being tarnished.
