= Kokila (1977 film) =

1977 film by Balu Mahendra

- Film poster
- Directed by: Balu Mahendra
- Written by: Balu Mahendra
- Produced by: T. Motcham Fernando
- Starring: Kamal Haasan; Shoba; Roja Ramani; Mohan
- Cinematography: Balu Mahendra
- Edited by: Umesh Kulkarni
- Music by: Salil Chowdhury
- Production company: Commercial Films
- Distributed by: G.N. Films
- Release date: 7 October 1977
- Running time: 140 minutes
- Country: India
- Language: Kannada

Kokila is a 1977 Indian Kannada-language romance film directed, written and filmed by Balu Mahendra. The film stars Shoba playing the title character along with Kamal Haasan, Roja Ramani and Mohan in other prominent roles. The film marked the directorial debut of Balu Mahendra, who was a cinematographer working predominantly in South Indian films then. The film also marked the acting debut of actor Mohan.

The film was produced by T. Motcham Fernando under the banner of Commercial Films. It was distributed & worldwide negative rights owner by G.N. Films.Chennai.India. The music of the film was composed by Salil Chowdhury with lyrics written by Chi. Udayashankar. The cinematography was done by Balu Mahendra himself, while editing was done by Umesh Kulkarni. Kokila was released on 7 October 1977 to critical acclaim. The film was a commercial success upon release in Karnataka and Tamil Nadu, becoming the first Kannada film to be screened for 100 days in Madras (now Chennai). Mahendra won the National Film Award for Best Cinematography and Karnataka State Film Award for Best Screenplay. The film was remade into Malayalam as Oomakkuyil and in Hindi as Aur Ek Prem Kahani both by Mahendra himself in 1983 and 1996, respectively.

== Plot ==
Kokila, a medical college student, lives with father, who is an engineer, and mother in a home in Bangalore. A housemaid Chenni, who is very close to the family, also lives with them. As Kokila's father travels a lot and his wife is suffering from health problems, they decide to keep a paying guest. Vijayakumar, a bank executive, comes and lives in the household as a paying guest. Kokila and Vijay fall in love and plan to get married with the consent of her parents. Meanwhile, one night, Vijay and Chenni are left alone in the home. They both end up making love, and Kokila after her return remains unaware about this incident, though Chenni is well aware of Kokila's affair with Vijay. Vijay, however, forgets Chenni and continues to live with his normal love for Kokila. Suddenly, one day while Kokila is away on a college tour, Vijay gets to know that Chenni is pregnant. Heggadadevanakote Murali Manohar Rao Bhaskar Rao suggests to Vijay that the child shouldn't be aborted and that a real man would never do that . Meanwhile , the dejected Chenni leaves the house. When Kokila returns from the tour, she finds both Vijay and Chenni missing. She is informed by her mother that Vijay has vacated the room and makes several unsuccessful attempts to find his whereabouts. After three years, Kokila meets Vijay accidentally, in a village where she is posted as a doctor. At the point in time, she gets to know that Vijay and Chenni got married and have a child named Kokila.

== Cast ==
- Kamal Haasan as Vijayakumar
- Shoba as Kokila
- Roja Ramani as Chenni
- Mohan as Heggadadevanakote Murali Manohar Rao Bhaskar Rao
- Rajaram as A. Sivaramulu
- Sushma Veer as Vijay and Chenni's daughter

== Production ==
Kokila was the directorial debut of Balu Mahendra, who was one of the leading cinematographers in South Indian cinema at the time. The film also marked the debut of Mohan, who would go on to establish himself as a successful actor in the Tamil cinema. People from five different industries worked in the film; Shoba (Malayalam), Kamal Haasan and Balu Mahendra (Tamil), Roja Ramani (Telugu), Mohan (Kannada) and Salil Choudhry (Bengali). None of them except Mohan knew Kannada at the time. Mohan was a student of Benaka, a theatre troupe run by B. V. Karanth. Mohan was acting in a play named Sidhathe alongside G. V. Iyer and Girish Karnad and he was asked to send his photograph to Mahendra who was in search of new actors for his debut directorial venture. Subsequently, Mohan was offered a role in the film in which he played Kamal's friend. According to Haasan, the film was made in Kannada, rather than Tamil, because during that time, "It was felt that the Tamil audience would not accept 'different' films". Balu Mahendra shot a few sequences at Hotel Paraag and a huge rock in Cubbon Park in Bangalore. He shot the rock in various angles and used it in the film. The final length of the film was 3,954.78 metres (12,975.0 ft). Despite not being fluent in Kannada, Haasan dubbed in his own voice.

== Soundtrack ==
The soundtrack album and background score for Kokila were composed by Salil Chowdhury with lyrics by Chi. Udayashankar. The song Sanje Thangaali Mai Sokalu is based on the Malayalam song Raappadi Paadunna which Salil Chowdhury had composed for the Malayalam film Vishukkani, and also Bengali version Aj Noy Gun Gun Gunjan sung by Lata Mangeshkar. All the versions were released in same year, 1977.

Track list
| No. | Title | Singer(s) | Length |
|---|---|---|---|
| 1. | "Sanje Thangaali Mai Sokalu" | S. Janaki |
| 2. | "Gum Gum Endu Dumbigalu Haradi" | S. P. Balasubrahmanyam, Vani Jairam |

== Release and reception ==
Kokila was released in theatres on 7 October 1977.

=== Critical reception ===
The film was screened at the International Film Festival of India then known as "Filmotsav78" in Madras (now Chennai). In 2008, film critic and cartoonist Madhan said, "When I saw the movie, I was stunned. It was such a beautiful movie, up there in the league of Truffaut and his The 400 Blows."

=== Box office ===
Kokila was a box-office success not only in Karnataka, but also in the neighbouring state of Tamil Nadu. In 1980, it became the first Kannada film to have a 100-day run in Madras. The film was released in its original language without being dubbed to Tamil, three years after the release, and ran for more than 140 days in Chennai, a record for a Kannada film in Tamil Nadu. Mohan became popularly known as "Kokila Mohan" after the film's success. Mahendra later remade the film in Malayalam as Oomakkuyil (1983) and in Hindi as Aur Ek Prem Kahani (1996).

== Accolades ==
=== National Film Awards ===
- 1978 – National Film Award for Best Cinematography (Black-and-white motion picture) at the 25th National Film Awards

=== Karnataka State Film Awards ===
- 1978 – Best Screenplay from the Government of Karnataka for Balu Mahendra
