= Velicham Vitharunna Penkutty =

- LP Vinyl Records Cover
- Directed by: Durai
- Written by: Durai
- Produced by: P. K. Kaimal
- Starring: Shankar; Poornima Jayaram; Swapna; Raveendran
- Cinematography: Ranga
- Edited by: Gowtham Raj
- Music by: Shyam
- Production company: Thirumeni Pictures
- Distributed by: Thirumeni Pictures
- Release date: 24 December 1982
- Running time: 130 min.
- Country: India
- Language: Malayalam

Velicham Vitharunna Penkutty is a 1982 Indian Malayalam-language film, directed by Durai and produced by P. K. Kaimal. The film stars Shankar, Poornima Jayaram, Swapna and Raveendran. The film has musical score by Shyam. The film also had a Tamil version as Punitha Malar.

== Cast ==
- Shankar as Prasad
- Poornima Jayaram as Geetha
- Swapna as Asha
- Raveendran as Jayan
- Sukumari as Parvathy
- Sankaradi as Sanku
- Vanitha Krishnachandran as Vanitha
- Nithya Ravindran as Nithya
- Sadhana as Pankajam
- Vanchiyoor Radha as villager
- Manavalan Joseph as Appu
- Kamala Kamesh as Geetha's mother
- Y. G. Mahendran as Swami
- P. R. Menon as Jyotsyar

== Soundtrack ==
The music was composed by Shyam and the lyrics were written by Mankombu Gopalakrishnan.

Song	Singers
"Guruvayoor Keshavante"	Vani Jairam
"Ilam Pennin"	Jolly Abraham
"Poocha Mindaapoocha"	Kausalya, Lathika
"Raaga Sandhya Manjala"	K. J. Yesudas, S. Janaki
