= Bava Bavamaridi =

- Directed by: Sarath
- Written by: Rajendra Kumar (dialogues)
- Screenplay by: A. Mohan
- Story by: Manoj Kumar; A. Mohan
- Based on: Pandithurai (1992)
- Produced by: C. M. Krishna; A. Mohan(Presents)
- Starring: Krishnam Raju; Suman; Jayasudha; Malashri
- Cinematography: S. Sudharshan Reddy
- Edited by: A. Bhaskar; A. Mohan
- Music by: Raj–Koti
- Production company: M. M. Movie Arts
- Release date: 4 June 1993
- Running time: 126 minutes
- Country: India
- Language: Telugu

Bava Bavamaridi is a 1993 Telugu-language drama film directed by Sarath. It stars Krishnam Raju, Suman, Jayasudha and Malashri, with music composed by Raj–Koti. The film is produced by Editor Mohan, and C. M. Krishna under the M. M. Movie Arts banner. It is a remake of Tamil film Pandithurai (1992). The film was a commercial hit at the box office. It successfully completed 100 days. The film includes the song "Bavalu Sayya," which continues to enjoy enduring popularity even decades after its release.

== Plot ==
Raghava Rao sees a young woman performing pooja at a temple, and instantly falls in love with her. This is Janaki, who belongs to a poor family, consisting of her dad, mom and younger brother named Raju. Raghava Rao sends an emissary to Janaki's Father, who is delighted to give his daughter to Raghava Rao in marriage, and the wedding is celebrated with due ceremony. Janaki is very fond of Raju and takes him along with her to her husband's house. This is the only "gift" that Jankai's impoverished parents are able to give their daughter at the wedding, and it is also beneficial for the young boy to grow up in a more affluent household. At the Raghava Rao's palatial home. After that they had a daughter named Geetha.

The years pass. Raju, now grown up, is intensely attached and loyal to his brother-in-law. Geeta loves Raju. At first he does not accept because of his loyalty to his brother-in-law. After Seeing Geeta's true love he accepts her. Chintamani, a courtesan who sings and dances for a living. Chintamani has no relatives except one brother, an unscrupulous card-sharp named Bhoopathi who lives off his sister's earnings. Chintamani saves Raghava Rao from an accident where they planned and create situation that he make love with Chintamani. Her brother, posing as a respectable man, demands that Raghava Rao marry Chintamani and make the relationship public. Raghava Rao is reluctant. He is attached to his dutiful wife and loving brother-in-law. Raju is horrified to find relation between his brother-in-law and Chintamani. Raju falls at his feet and pleads with him not to take a second wife. His pleas fall on deaf ears; Raghava Rao decides to marry Chintamani. Raju tells his parents of what has happened. They come to Raghava Rao's mansion and create a scene. Annoyed at the commotion, he tells Jankai to make her choice once and for all: she can either accept Chintamani or depart with her parents for good. Jankai chooses to remain with her husband. After that Raju father died because of Shock. Raghava Raju also realises Geeta-Raju's love and he was not ready to give her daughter to Raju. All this creates enmity between Raghava Rao & Raju.

Bhoopathi reveals his plan to his sister and asks her to help him to abduct Raghava Rao's wealth, but Chintamani has undergone a personality change after realizing her mistake when Raghava Rao gave respect to her. She now wants to be a respectable woman and is extremely grateful to Him for having given her the chance to reform. She berates and opposes her brother, and makes it clear that she will inform Raghava Rao about his plan. Bhoopathi feels betrayed by his sister lost his only source of income, which was the money from his sister's song-and-dance performances. In a fit of rage, he plunges a knife into her stomach and kills her. He then makes an effort to frame Raghava Rao for Chintamani's murder.

At Climax Raju dispatches the villains, where Janaki knows real murder of Chintamani and she announces in speaker where fight place in Temple. He fought with villains rescues Geeta and protects Raghava Rao's honour. Raghava Rao, now reconciled with his beloved and loyal Raju, gives Geeta in marriage to him.

== Cast ==
- Krishnam Raju as Raghava Rao
- Suman as Raju
  - Master Ravi as Young Raju
- Malashri as Geeta
- Jayasudha as Janaki
- Silk Smitha as Chintamani
- Kota Srinivasa Rao as Peddapuram Pedda Rayudu
- Babu Mohan as Pithapuram Pilla Zamindar
- Anandaraj as Bhoopati
- P. L. Narayana as Raju's father
- Nirmalamma as Raju's mother

== Music ==
The film's music was composed by Raj–Koti, with the song "Bavalu Sayya" emerging as a chartbuster and maintaining its popularity to this day.

No.	Title	Lyrics	Singer(s)	Length
1.	"Gajja Gallu"	Veturi Sundararama Murthy	K. S. Chithra, S. P. Balasubrahmanyam
2.	"Uttarana Neeli"	Veturi Sundararama Murthy	K. S. Chithra, S. P. Balasubrahmanyam
3.	"Mayadari Teneteega"	D Narayana Varma	K. S. Chithra, S. P. Balasubrahmanyam
4.	"Jayamastu"	Traditional	K. S. Chithra
5.	"Konte Konangi"	Bhuvana Chandra	K. S. Chithra
6.	"Bavalu Sayya"	Veturi Sundararama Murthy	Radhika

== Awards ==
- Suman won Nandi Award for Best Actor for his excellent performance in this film
