= Kaattile Paattu =

- Directed by: K. P. Kumaran
- Written by: K. P. Kumaran
- Screenplay by: K. P. Kumaran
- Produced by: K. P. Kumaran
- Starring: Nedumudi Venu; Balan K. Nair; Poornima Jayaram; Sukumari
- Cinematography: Vipin Mohan
- Edited by: M. N. Appu
- Music by: K. Raghavan
- Production company: Prakruthi Films
- Distributed by: Prakruthi Films
- Release date: 29 October 1982
- Country: India
- Language: Malayalam

Kaattile Paattu is a 1982 Indian Malayalam film, written, directed and produced by K. P. Kumaran. The film stars Nedumudi Venu, Balan K. Nair, Poornima Jayaram and Sukumari in the lead roles. The film has musical score by K. Raghavan.

== Plot ==
It is a love story of a mentally disabled woman finding her place in the heart of a primeval tribal man.

== Cast ==
- Nedumudi Venu as Chinnan
- Balan K. Nair as Prabhakara Panikkar
- Poornima Jayaram as Priya
- Sukumari as Janaki
- Jagathy Sreekumar as Bombay Dharam
- Kaviyoor Ponnamma as Raji
- Adoor Bhasi as Raghavan Pilla
- Venu Nagavally as Devan
- Sreenivasan as Balu
- Maniyanpilla Raju as Raju
- Anju as Young Priya
- Kanakalatha as Latha
- Sankar Mohan as Suresh
- Madhu Iravankara
- Raghunath
- Aryad Gopalakrishnan
- Antony Vazhoor
- Chacko

== Soundtrack ==
Lyrics by Mullanezhi and songs composed by K. Raghavan. Background music scored by M. B. Sreenivasan

Track listing
No.	Title	Artist(s)	Length
1.	"Ambilikkombathe Ponnoonjaalil"	S. Janaki
2.	"Amme Prakrithee"	K. J. Yesudas
3.	"Amme Prakrithee" (Bit)	K. J. Yesudas
4.	"Ardhanaareeshwara"	K. J. Yesudas
5.	"Chirikkunna Nilaavinte"	K. J. Yesudas
6.	"Karimaana"	B. Vasantha, Choir, C. O. Anto, Kanakambaran
