= Aur Ek Prem Kahani =

1996 film

- Directed by: Balu Mahendra
- Written by: Balu Mahendra
- Produced by: Mahesh Bhatt; Amit Khanna
- Starring: Revathi; Ramesh Aravind; Heera Rajagopal; Akshay Anand
- Cinematography: Balu Mahendra
- Edited by: Balu Mahendra
- Music by: Ilayaraaja
- Distributed by: Eros
- Release date: 21 June 1996
- Country: India
- Language: Hindi

Aur Ek Prem Kahani (English: Another Love Story) is a 1996 Indian Hindi-language film directed by Balu Mahendra. The film stars Revathi, Ramesh Aravind, Heera Rajagopal, and Akshay Anand. It is a remake of Mahendra's Kannada film Kokila.

== Plot ==
Ranganathan (Sudhir Ahuja) is a middle aged engineer who lives in a middle class home in Madras with his wife Kamala (Sushma) and daughter Kokila (Heera Rajgopal), who is a medical student. Manga, (Revathy) a maid, lives with them and is treated like a member of the family. As Ranganathan travels a lot and his wife is not well, the family decides to keep a paying guest. Sathyamoorthy a bank executive (Ramesh Aravind) comes to live in the Ranganathan household. Kokila and Sathyamoorthy fall in love and plan to get married with her parents' consent. Meanwhile, one night perchance Sathya and the maid Manga are alone in the house. One thing leads to another and before they realise, they end up making love. Kokila remains unaware of this incident even as Manga knows about Kokila's affair with Sathya. Sathya soon forgets the Manga episode and continues his romance with Kokila. One day while Kokila is away on a college tour, Satya is informed by Manga that she is pregnant and hopes he will not let her down. Sathya suggests that Manga abort the child. Manga is shattered and leaves the Ranganathan house. Kokila comes back from the college tour and finds Sathya missing. He has vacated the room, says her mother, and all attempts by Kokila to trace him remain futile. Kokila and Sathya meet each other accidentally, after few years in a village where she has gone as a doctor. She discovers Satya has married Manga and they have a young daughter whom they have named Kokila.

== Cast ==
- Revathi as Manga
- Ramesh Aravind as Sathyamoorthy
- Heera Rajagopal as Kokila
- Akshay Anand as Govindram Dinanath Vijaykumar Shastri
- K. Kameshwari
- Charle as Bus conductor
- Sushma Ahuja as Kamla
- Sudhir Ahuja as Shankar
- Nair Raman as Patient
- Vatsala Rajagopal as Dr. Elavathi
- Chokkalinga Bhagavathar as Patient

== Soundtrack ==
Music is provided by Ilaiyaraja. He has reimagined his own tunes from Johnny, Alaigal Oivathillai, Mann Vasanai and Auto Raja.

Track	Singer(s)	Original Movie	Original Song
"Naina Bole Naina" (part 1)	Asha Bhosle	Johnny	"Kaatril Enthan Geetham"
"Hona Hai Tho"	Mano, Asha Bhosle	Mann Vasanai	"Pothi Vacha Malliga"
"Monday Tho Utkar"	Mano, Preeti Uttam Singh	Auto Raja	"Sangathil Paadatha"
"Meri Zindagi"	Asha Bhosle	Alaigal Oivathillai	"Kaadhal Oviyam"
"Naina Bole Naina" (part 2)	Asha Bhosle	Johnny	"Kaatril Enthan Geetham"
