= Vivaha Bhojanambu (1988 film) =

1988 film by Jandhyala

- Theatrical release poster
- Directed by: Jandhyala
- Screenplay by: Jandhyala
- Story by: Aadi Vishnu
- Produced by: Jandhyala; Jaya Krishna
- Starring: Rajendra Prasad; Chandra Mohan; Ashwini
- Cinematography: Vijay C. Kumar
- Edited by: Gautam Raju
- Music by: S. P. Balasubrahmanyam
- Production company: J. J. Movies
- Release date: 5 May 1988
- Running time: 142 mins
- Country: India
- Language: Telugu

Vivaha Bhojanambu (transl. Wedding feast) is a 1988 Telugu-language romantic comedy film directed by Jandhyala, who also co-produced the film with Jayakrishna. The film stars Rajendra Prasad, Ashwini, and Chandra Mohan in the lead roles, with music composed by S. P. Balasubrahmanyam.

The title of the film is inspired by a popular song from the 1957 film Mayabazar, with the original song and its video being featured during the credits. Vivaha Bhojanambu was a commercial success. The film is particularly noted for its comedy scenes, which feature Sutti Veerabhadra Rao and Brahmanandam, contributing to its lasting popularity in Telugu cinema. Notably, Brahmanandam later included Vivaha Bhojanambu among the top 11 films in his career.

== Plot ==
Seetarama Rao is a misogynist who leads an organisation against women, forming associations called Stri Dwesha Samajam (Women Haters Association) and Bharya Bhaditula Sangam (Victims of Wife Association). His actions attract the attention of Head Constable Nippu Appala Swamy, who seeks to understand the reasons behind his behaviour. The story then unfolds in a flashback, revealing the events of Seetarama Rao’s past.

Seetarama Rao and his younger brother Krishna were raised by their brother-in-law Vasu and sister Subhadra. Throughout his childhood, Seetarama Rao is portrayed as naive and often mocked by others. His life takes a turn when he is saved from quicksand by a beautiful girl named Lavanya. He becomes infatuated with her and tries multiple ways to win her love, but Lavanya’s cross-cousin, Subba Rao, who also desires her, threatens him.

During an awkward encounter, Lavanya publicly slaps Seetarama Rao, causing him to feel ashamed. However, she later sends him a letter explaining that Subba Rao was forcing her into marriage and that she truly loved Seetarama Rao. Upon learning this, Seetarama Rao sets out to find Lavanya, but she humiliates and expels him. This marks the turning point in his journey.

Meanwhile, Vasu Rao and Subhadra arrive and meet Lavanya, who reveals the truth. To protect Seetarama Rao from Subba Rao, Lavanya had previously humiliated and expelled him. Now, Lavanya decides to win back Seetarama Rao's love. To do so, she moves into his neighborhood and starts an organisation aimed at opposing him.

Meanwhile, Krishna falls in love with Lavanya’s sister, Vasundhara, and Seetarama Rao’s loyal follower, Kailasam, becomes infatuated with Vasu’s mute sister, Jyothi. The situation escalates when Krishna elopes with Vasundhara and attempts suicide, but they are rescued by Appala Swamy. Eventually, Subba Rao exposes the truth to Seetarama Rao, who is filled with remorse and contemplates suicide. However, the film concludes on a positive note with the marriages of the three couples, bringing the story to a happy end.

== Cast ==
- Rajendra Prasad as Seetarama Rao
- Ashwini as Lavanya
- Chandra Mohan as Vasu Rao
- Suthi Veerabhadra Rao as Lingam
- Suthi Velu as Head Constable Nippu Appalaswamy
- Brahmanandam as Kavi
- Subhalekha Sudhakar as Kailasam
- S. P. Balasubrahmanyam as Inspector
- Harish as Krishna
- Vidya Sagar as Subba Rao
- Bhimaraju as Lord Hanuman
- Gundu Hanumantha Rao as Constable 111
- Ashok Kumar as Priest
- Potti Prasad as Simhachalam
- Satti Babu as Lecturer
- Dham as Thief
- Rama Prabha as Durga
- Rajyalakshmi as Subhadra
- Rajitha as Jyothi
- Ratnasagar as Kaveri
- Pavala Syamala as Syamala
- Haritha as Vasundhara

== Production ==
The film was shot extensively in Visakhapatnam, Andhra Pradesh. Rajendra Prasad appeared as a woman for the first time in this film.

== Music ==
Vivaaha Bhojanambu

Film score by S. P. Balasubrahmanyam
- Released: 1988
- Genre: Soundtrack
- Length: 22:14
- Label: AVM Audio
- Producer: S. P. Balasubrahmanyam

S. P. Balasubrahmanyam chronology
Chinnodu Peddodu (1988)	Vivaaha Bhojanambu (1988)	Neeku Naaku Pellanta (1988)

Music for the film was composed by S. P. Balasubrahmanyam. Audio soundtrack was released on AVM Audio Company.

S. No.	Song title	Lyrics	Singers	length
1	"Vivahle Nasinchali"	Jonnavithhula	S. P. Balasubrahmanyam	4:27
2	"Jum Tanana"	Vennelakanti	S. P. Balasubrahmanyam, SP Charan	4:18
3	"Prema"	Vennelakanti	S. P. Balasubrahmanyam, S. P. Sailaja	4:28
4	"Amma Thalli Priya"	Veturi	S. P. Balasubrahmanyam	4:44
5	"Seetarama Swamy"	Mullapudi Sastry	S. P. Balasubrahmanyam, S. Janaki	4:17

== Reception ==
Griddaluri Gopalrao of Zamin Ryot in his review dated 13 May 1988 criticized the film for its lack of novelty, while also adding that the performances of Rajendra Prasad and others were not their best.
