= Mugiyada Kathe =

- Directed by: Durai
- Written by: Durai
- Screenplay by: Durai
- Produced by: P. H. Rama Rao; Pandari Bai
- Starring: Rajesh; Sumithra; Pandari Bai; Dinesh
- Cinematography: V. Manohar
- Edited by: M. R. Bhaskaran
- Music by: Rajan–Nagendra
- Production company: Sri Panduranga Productions
- Distributed by: Sri Panduranga Productions
- Release date: 4 November 1976
- Country: India
- Language: Kannada

Mugiyada Kathe ( transl. An Unfinished Story) is a 1976 Indian Kannada-language film, directed by Durai and produced by P. H. Rama Rao and R. Pandari Bai. The film stars Rajesh, Sumithra, Pandari Bai and Dinesh. The film has musical score by Rajan–Nagendra.This film is a remake of Avalum Penn Thane(1974) also directed by Durai.

== Cast ==
- Rajesh
- Sumithra
- Pandari Bai
- Dinesh
- M. S. Sathya
- Bhaskar
- Sundar Krishna Urs
- K. Deepak
- Mynavathi
- Ramadevi
- R. T. Rama
- Padmanjali
- Premakumari
- Indira Arasu
- K. S. Ashwath in Guest Appearance
- T. N. Balakrishna in Guest Appearance
- Gangadhar in Guest Appearance
- Advani Lakshmi Devi in Guest Appearance
- Shailashree in Guest Appearance
- Radhika

== Soundtrack ==
The music was composed by Rajan–Nagendra.

No.	Song	Singers	Lyrics	Length (m:ss)
1	"Kangalu Vandane"	S. P. Balasubrahmanyam, S. Janaki	Chi. Udaya Shankar	03:39
2	"Mutthu Uruli Hogi"	S. P. Balasubrahmanyam	Chi. Udaya Shankar	03:35
