= Ente Neelakaasham =

- Directed by: Thoppil Bhasi
- Written by: George Onakkoor; Thoppil Bhasi (dialogues)
- Screenplay by: Thoppil Bhasi
- Starring: Shobha; Sukumaran; Sankaradi; Sreelatha Namboothiri
- Cinematography: Jayanan Vincent
- Music by: K. Raghavan
- Production company: Asharaf Films
- Distributed by: Asharaf Films
- Release date: 26 January 1979
- Country: India
- Language: Malayalam

Ente Neelakaasham is a 1979 Indian Malayalam film directed by Thoppil Bhasi. The film stars Shobha, Sukumaran, Sankaradi and Sreelatha Namboothiri in the lead roles. It won the Kerala State Film Award for Best Actress for Shobha. The film has musical score by K. Raghavan.

== Cast ==
- Shobha as Malathy
- Sukumaran as Shekharan
- Sankaradi as Raghava Panikker
- Sreelatha Namboothiri as Chelamma
- Bahadoor as Naanu
- K. P. Ummer as Keshava Pilla
- KPAC Premachandran as Rajan
- KPAC Sunny as Sankaran Nair
- Meena as Devaki
- Ravi Menon as Chandran
- Thodupuzha Vasanthi as Madhavi
- Thoppil Krishna Pillai as Vaidyan
- KPAC Khan

== Soundtrack ==
The music was composed by K. Raghavan and the lyrics for the songs were written by O. N. V. Kurup.

No.	Song	Singers	Lyrics	Length (m:ss)
1	"Akale Aakaasha Panineer"	K. J. Yesudas	O. N. V. Kurup	
2	"Chembakappoo"	P. Susheela	O. N. V. Kurup	
3	"Ente Neelakaasham"	P. Susheela, Ambili	O. N. V. Kurup	
4	"Koottiladachoru"	K. J. Yesudas	O. N. V. Kurup	
5	"Thekku Thekku Thekkuninnoru"	Ambili, K. P. Brahmanandan	O. N. V. Kurup	
