= Kaikeyi (film) =

- Directed by: I. V. Sasi
- Written by: P. Padmarajan
- Screenplay by: P. Padmarajan
- Produced by: Hari Pothan
- Starring: Srividya; Prathap Pothen; Poornima Jayaram; Radhika
- Cinematography: Ashok Kumar
- Edited by: K. Narayanan
- Music by: M. S. Viswanathan
- Production company: Supriya
- Distributed by: Supriya
- Release date: 4 November 1983
- Country: India
- Language: Malayalam

Kaikeyi is a 1983 Indian Malayalam language film, directed by I. V. Sasi and produced by Hari Pothan. The film stars Srividya, Prathap Pothen, Poornima Jayaram and Radhika. The film has musical score by M. S. Viswanathan.

== Cast ==
- Srividya
- Prathap Pothen
- Poornima Jayaram
- Radhika
- Vanitha Krishnachandran

== Soundtrack ==
The music was composed by M. S. Viswanathan and the lyrics were written by Poovachal Khader.

No.	Song	Singers	Lyrics	Length (m:ss)
1	"Jhil Jhil Jhillennu"	S. Janaki, Krishnachandran	Poovachal Khader	
2	"Saayoojyam Ekaantha Saayoojyam"	P. Jayachandran	Poovachal Khader	
