= Oru Thira Pinneyum Thira =

- LP Records Cover
- Directed by: P. G. Vishwambharan
- Written by: Sunitha; Dr Pavithran (dialogues)
- Screenplay by: Dr. Pavithran
- Produced by: M. Mani
- Starring: Prem Nazir; Mammootty; Ratheesh; Premji
- Cinematography: D. D. Prasad
- Edited by: V. P. Krishnan
- Music by: Shyam; M. G. Radhakrishnan; Lyrics: Bichu Thirumala; Chunakkara Ramankutty
- Production company: Sunitha Productions
- Distributed by: Sunitha Productions
- Release date: 23 July 1982
- Country: India
- Language: Malayalam

Oru Thira Pinneyum Thira is a 1982 Indian Malayalam-language film, directed by P. G. Vishwambharan and produced by M. Mani. The film stars Prem Nazir, Mammootty, Ratheesh and Premji. The film has musical score by Shyam and M. G. Radhakrishnan. The film was a remake of the Tamil film Oru Vidukadhai Oru Thodarkadhai.

== Cast ==
- Prem Nazir as Gopinath
- Mammootty as Jayadevan
- Ratheesh as Mohan
- Premji as Kittunni Marar
- Sathyakala as Sudha
- Swapna as Rema
- Kalaranjini as Latha
- Jagathy Sreekumar as Rajappan

== Soundtrack ==
The music was composed by Shyam and M. G. Radhakrishnan with lyrics by Chunakkara Ramankutty and Bichu Thirumala.

No.	Song	Singers	Lyrics	Length (m:ss)
1	"Devi Nin Roopam Shishiramaasa"	K. J. Yesudas	Chunakkara Ramankutty	
2	"Devi Nin Roopam Shishiramaasa" (sad)	K. J. Yesudas	Chunakkara Ramankutty	
3	"Muthiyamman Kovilile"	Vani Jairam, Chorus	Bichu Thirumala	
4	"Oru Thira" (Raagaparagam Thookivarum)	K. J. Yesudas, Chorus	Chunakkara Ramankutty	
