= Poornima Bhagyaraj =

Indian actress

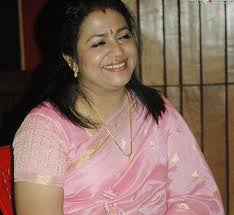
- Born: Poornima Jayaram; 17 July 1960 (age 66); Mumbai, Maharashtra, India
- Years active: 1977–1985; 2013–present
- Spouse: K. Bhagyaraj (m. 1984; died 2026)
- Children: 2 (incl Shanthanu Bhagyaraj)

Poornima Bhagyaraj (née Jayaram) is an Indian actress who works predominantly in Malayalam and Tamil films. She has also done a few Hindi and Telugu films. She is best known for her leading roles from 1980 to 1985. She married late actor and director K. Bhagyaraj, who died on 27 June 2026.

== Early life ==
Poornima was born and brought up in Mumbai. She learned Bharatanatyam in Sri Rajarajeswari Bharatha Natya Kala Mandir, Mumbai. Her grandfather was the founding member of Shanmukhananda Sabha, Mumbai.

== Filmography ==
=== Tamil ===
Year	Film	Role	Notes
1981	Nenjil Oru Mull	Madhavi	
1981	Kilinjalgal	Julie	
1982	Theeratha Vilayattu Pillai		
1982	Payanangal Mudivathillai	Radha	
1982	Paritchaiku Neramachu	Jayanthi	
1982	Thaai Mookaambikai	Durga	
1982	Darling, Darling, Darling	Radha	
1982	Nandri, Meendum Varuga		Guest appearance
1982	Punitha Malar		
1982	Kathal Oru Jeevanathi		
1982	Mamiyara Marumagala		
1983	Thambathigal		
1983	Kann Sivanthaal Mann Sivakkum	Arundhati	
1983	Sashti Viradam	Valli	
1983	Nenjamellam Neeyey		
1983	Mundhanai Mudichu	Vaathiyar's first wife	
1983	En Aasai Unnoduthan		
1983	Naalu Perukku Nandri		
1983	Antha Sila Naatkal		
1983	Thanga Magan	Chithra	
1984	Vidhi	Radha	
1984	Unga Veetu Pillai		
1984	Neengal Kettavai	Arun - Ramu's mother	
1985	Aduthathu Albert	Paanchali	
2013	Aadhalal Kadhal Seiveer	Karthi's mother	
2014	Jilla	Sivan's wife	
2016	Vaaimai	Devakiammal	
2017	Mupparimanam	Herself	Guest Appearance (Let's Go Party)
2018	Mohini	Menaka	
2018	Rajavin Paarvai Raniyin Pakkam	Herself	
2019	Raatchasi	Susheela	
2023	Rudhran	Indhrani	
2023	Theerkadarishi		
2025	Aghathiyaa	Dr Vaideeshwari	Cameo appearance
2026	Hi		

=== Malayalam ===
Year	Title	Role	Notes
2018	Mohanlal	Herself (Archive footage)	
2015	Rock Star	Gayathri	
2008	Twenty: 20	Herself (Archive footage)	
1987	Kaiyethum Doorathu	Yamuna	Production in 1984
1984	Onnanu Nammal	Seetha	
1984	Veruthe Oru Pinakkam	Anitha	
1983	Hello Madras Girl	Swapna	
1983	Oomakkuyil	Radha	
1983	Karyam Nisaaram	Parvathi	
1983	Naanayam	Maya	
1983	Marakkillorikkalum	Archana	
1983	Pin Nilavu	Parvathi	
1983	Prasnam Gurutharam	Viji	
1983	Kinnaram	Radha	
1983	Rachana	Thulasi	
1983	Yudham	Sheela	
1983	Kaikeyi		
1983	Mazhanilaavu	Susheela	
1983	Ente Mamattikkuttiyammakku	Mercy	
1982	Ithiri Neram Othiri Karyam	Vimala	
1982	Kelkatha Shabdam	Poornima	
1982	Njan Ekanaanu	Sindhu	
1982	Olangal	Radha	
1982	Padayottam	Laila	
1982	Aa Rathri	Indu	
1982	Sooryan	Ammini	
1982	Aayudham	Sandhya	
1982	Snehapoorvam Meera	Meera	
1982	Kaattile Pattu	Priya	
1982	Velicham Vitharunna Penkutti	Geetha	
1982	Gaanam	Sreedevi	
1982	Ruby My Darling	Ruby	
1981	Oothikachiya Ponnu	Sukumari	
1981	Ahimsa	Suma	
1980	Manjil Virinja Pookkal	Prabha	

=== Telugu ===
Year	Title	Role	Notes
1983	Manthrigari Viyyankudu	Anuradha	
2019	Ninu Veedani Needanu Nene	Arjun's mother	

=== Hindi ===
Year	Title	Role	Notes
1977	Paheli	Champa	
1978	Dillagi		
1979	Ratnadeep		
1981	Dard		

=== Producer ===
Year	Title	Language	Notes
1989	Aararo Aariraro	Tamil	
1992	Amma Vanthachu	Tamil	
1992	Sundara Kandam	Tamil	
1996	Vaettiya Madichu Kattu	Tamil	

== Short film ==
Year	Film	Role	Notes
2021	Family	Judge	

== Television ==
=== Serials ===
Year	Title	Role	Language	Channel
2018–2020	Kanmani	Vijayalakshmi	Tamil	Sun TV
2020–2021	Suryavamsam	Annammal "Annapoorani"	Tamil	Zee Tamil
2021	Poove Unakkaga	Herself (Special Appearance)	Tamil	Sun TV
2021–2022	Enga Veetu Meenakshi	Valliammai	Tamil	Colors Tamil
2024	Malli	Vidhya	Tamil	Sun TV
2025	Karthigai Deepam	Rajeshwari (Special Appearance)	Tamil	Zee Tamil

=== Shows ===
Year	Shows	Role	Language	Channel
2015	Koffee with DD	Guest	Tamil	Vijay TV
2015	Ninaithale Inikkum	Guest	Tamil	Vendhar TV
2019	Comedy Stars Season 2	Guest	Malayalam	Asianet
2020	Kodeeswari	Participant	Tamil	Colors Tamil
2021	Rajaparvai	Herself	Tamil	Sun TV

=== Web series ===
Year	Title	Role	Network
2022	Paper Rocket	Dr. Sheila	ZEE5
2022	Fall		Disney+ Hotstar

== Awards and honours ==
Year	Award	Award category	Awarded work	Reference
1980	Kerala State Film Award	Best Actress	Manjil Virinja Pookkal	
1982	Filmfare Awards South	Filmfare Award for Best Actress – Tamil	Payanangal Mudivathillai	
1982	Filmfare Awards South	Filmfare Award for Best Actress – Malayalam	Olangal	
