= Ormakal Marikkumo =

- Poster
- Directed by: K. S. Sethumadhavan
- Screenplay by: K. S. Sethumadhavan; N. Govindan Kutty (dialogues)
- Story by: Joseph Anand
- Produced by: K. S. Sethumadhavan, K. S. R. Moorthy
- Starring: Kamal Haasan; Shobha; Vidhubala; Jayan; M. G. Soman
- Cinematography: Marcus Bartley
- Edited by: T. R. Sreenivasalu
- Music by: M. S. Viswanathan
- Production company: Chithrakalakendram
- Distributed by: Central Pictures
- Release date: 26 August 1977
- Country: India
- Language: Malayalam

Ormakal Marikkumo (transl. Do memories die?) is a 1977 Indian Malayalam-language film, directed and produced by K. S. Sethumadhavan. The film stars Kamal Haasan, Shoba and Vidhubala. M. S. Viswanathan composed the music. Shobha won the Kerala State Film Award for Second Best Actress. The film was later dubbed in Telugu language as Parvathi Malli Puttindi and Hindi as Afsana Do Dil Kaa.

== Plot ==
Kamal Haasan and Vidhubala are a happily married couple. The first half is full of scenes that involve both of them. The story goes into a flashback where Kamal Haasan and Vidhubala are a couple where Kamal Haasan suspects Vidhubala and kills her. Shoba reincarnates as Vidhubala and tells the truth to Kamal Haasan. Upon hearing the story, Kamal Haasan gets himself killed by running towards a lorry. The film ends on a sad note with both Kamal Haasan and Shoba dying at the end.

== Cast ==
- Kamal Haasan as Chandrasekharan
- Shobha as Ammini/Parvathi
- Vidhubala as Parvathi
- Jayan as Prabhakaran
- M. G. Soman as Dr. Aravindan
- Sankaradi as Chandrasekharan's uncle
- T. R. Omana as Thankamani
- Prema as Lakshmi/Aravindan's mother
- Kunchan as Pappu
- Pala Thankam as Chellamma
- Paravoor Bharathan as Narayanan
- Poojappura Ravi as Vaidyar
- Radhadevi as Janakiyamma
- Mythili as Usha
- Vanchiyoor Radha as Teacher
- Ramu as Ravi
- Kedamangalam Ali

== Production ==
In an interview with Ravi Menon on the talk show Chakkarapanthal, actress Vidhubala recalled shooting the slow motion song sequence in this film, She and Kamal Haasan actually moved and danced slowly since the technique had not yet been introduced in Malayalam cinema. The film produced under banner Chitrakalakendram, and the final length of the film was 3,543.00 metres (11,624.02 ft).

== Soundtrack ==
The music was composed by M. S. Viswanathan with lyrics by Mankombu Gopalakrishnan.

No.	Song	Singers	Lyrics	Length (m:ss)
1	"Chandramadathinte"	K. J. Yesudas	Mankombu Gopalakrishnan	
2	"Naanam Kallananam"	K. J. Yesudas, Sujatha Mohan	Mankombu Gopalakrishnan	
3	"Thriprayaarappa Sree Rama"	Vani Jairam	Mankombu Gopalakrishnan	

== Release ==
Ormakal Marikkumo was released on 26 August 1977. Shobha won the Kerala State Film Award for Second Best Actress. The film was dubbed in Telugu language as Parvathi Malli Puttindi and released on 27 August 1982, Hindi as Afsana Do Dil Kaa (1982).
