= Shoba =

Indian actress (1962–1980)

Shobha
- Shobha from the film Moodu Pani (1980)
- Born: Mahalakshmi Menon; 23 September 1962
- Died: 1 May 1980 (aged 17); Chennai, Tamil Nadu, India
- Cause of death: Suicide by hanging
- Other names: Shoba Mahendra, Urvashi Shoba, Baby Mahalakshmi, Baby Shoba
- Occupation: Actress
- Years active: 1965–1980
- Spouse: Balu Mahendra (m. 1978)
- Mother: Prema

Mahalakshmi Menon, known by her stagename Shobha (23 September 1962 – 1 May 1980), was an Indian actress best known for her work in Malayalam and Tamil films. At the age of 17, she won the National Film Award for Best Actress for her role in the 1979 Tamil film Pasi. She also received three Kerala State Film Awards: for Best Actress (1978), Best Supporting Actress (1977) and Best Child Artist (1971); and two Filmfare Awards South for Best Actress in Kannada (1978) and Tamil (1979) films. Considered one of the finest talents to have emerged in the Indian film world, her promising career was cut short as she committed suicide in 1980, for unknown reasons. Her popularity resulted in considerable public scrutiny of the events that led to her death and also various conspiracy theories. The 1983 Malayalam film Lekhayude Maranam Oru Flashback is supposedly based on her life and death.

Born to Malayali parents in Madras, she started her career in the Tamil film industry, making her debut as a child artist in Thattungal Thirakkappadum (1966). Her first film as the main lead actress was the 1978 Malayalam film Uthrada Rathri.

== Early life ==
Shoba was born on 23 September 1961 to K. P. Menon and Prema Menon – an actress credited by the mononym Prema, in the Malayalam film industry, from 1954 to 1981.

== Career ==
In 1966, Shoba made her screen debut in Tamil thriller film Thattungal Thirakkappadum directed by actor J. P. Chandrababu. In the film she was credited as Baby Mahalakshmi where she played the role of Lakshmi opposite actress Savitri, K. R. Vijaya, R. S. Manohar and Chandrababu himself. The following year she made her debut in Malayalam cinema in P. Venu's Udhyogastha, where she was credited as Baby Shoba. The film has been touted as the first "multi-starrer" of Malayalam cinema, with such top actors as Sathyan, Prem Nazir, K. P. Ummer, Padmini, Sharada, Sheela and Rajasree; the huge hit, in a film targeted to all ages, brought Shoba wide attention as a child actor.

In 1978 she was cast as a heroine in Uthrada Rathri, a film directed by Balachandra Menon. She received the Kerala government's Best Actress award for the 1978 films Bandhanam and Ente Neelakaasham. The same year she earned the Best Actress award by Filmfare for the Kannada cinema film Aparichita. In 1979 she received the National Award for Best Actress for the Tamil film Pasi, which was produced by Lalitha, the eldest of the Travancore sisters. She also received the Filmfare Best Actress award for Pasi and received the Second Best Actress award from the Kerala government in 1977 for the film Ormakal Marikkumo.

== Death ==
Shobha is alleged to have committed suicide by hanging at the age of 17. She was married to Balu Mahendra when she was only 15 years old. The 1983 Malayalam film Lekhayude Maranam Oru Flashback directed by K. G. George is loosely based on her life and death.

== Filmography ==
=== Malayalam films ===
Year	Title	Role	Notes
1965	Jeevithayaathra		Child artist
1966	Karuna		Child artist
1966	Penmakkal		Child artist
1967	Ollathumathi		Child artist
1967	Udhyogastha		Child artist
1967	Pareeksha		Child artist
1968	Kadal		Child artist
1968	Adhyapika		Child artist
1968	Aparadhini		Child artist
1969	Kuruthikkalam		Child artist
1969	Veettumrugam		Child artist
1971	Avalalpam Vaikippoyi		Child artist
1971	Yogamullaval		Child artist
1971	Sindooracheppu	Ammalu	Child artist
1971	Makane Ninakku Vendi	Young Sophia	Child artist
1972	Taxi Car	Baby Shobha	Child artist
1972	Gandharavakshetram	Young Lakshmi	Child artist
1972	Aradimanninte Janmi	Minikutty	Child artist
1973	Udayam	Young Geetha	Child artist
1973	Bhadradeepam	Lekha	Child artist
1974	Ayalathe Sundari	Shobha	
1974	Night Duty	Ammini	
1975	Ayodhya	Shanthi	
1976	Chottanikkara Amma		
1976	Amrithavaahini	Rani	
1977	Dweepu		
1977	Ormakal Marikkumo	Ammini/Parvathi	
1977	Nurayum Pathayum		
1977	Rajaparambara		
1978	Pad–aram	Shoba	
1978	Randu Penkuttikal		
1978	Vayanadan Thamban		
1978	Uthrada Rathri		
1978	Oolkatal	Reena	
1978	Ekakini		
1978	Bandhanam	Thankam	
1979	Lillyppookkal		
1979	Ishtapraaneshwari	Rema	
1979	Ente Neelakaasham	Malathy	
1980	Shalini Ente Koottukari	Shalini	
1980	Daaliya Pookkal		
1980	Soorya Daaham		
1980	Yovvanam Daham		
1980	Manju Moodal Manju		

=== Tamil films ===
Year	Title	Role	Notes
1965	Naanal		Child artist
1966	Thattungal Thirakkappadum		Child artist
1969	Iru Kodugal		Child artist
1971	Punnagai		Child artist
1974	Vairam	Usha	
1978	Achchani		
1978	Nizhal Nijamagiradhu	Thilagam	
1978	Oru Veedu Oru Ulagam	Gowri	
1978	Mullum Malarum	Valli	
1979	Veettukku Veedu Vasappadi	Latha	
1979	Oru Vidukadhai Oru Thodarkadhai	Kamala Typist	
1979	Enippadigal	Chella Kannu	
1979	Chakkalathi	Panchali	
1979	Agal Vilakku	Navaneetham	
1979	Azhiyatha Kolangal	Indumathi	
1979	Pasi	Kuppamma	
1980	Veli Thandiya Velladu		
1980	Ponnagaram	Bhavani	Released posthumously
1980	Samanthipoo	Sakthi	Released posthumously
1980	Moodu Pani	Rekha	Released posthumously
1981	Mayil		Released posthumously
1981	Vaadagai Veedu		Released posthumously
1981	Anbulla Athan		Released posthumously

=== Kannada films ===
Year	Title	Role	Notes
1977	Kokila	Kokila	
1978	Aparichita	Kusuma	
1982	Amara Madhura Prema		Released posthumously

=== Telugu films ===
Year	Title	Role	Notes
1977	Tharam Marindi	Chenna	
1978	Manavoori Pandavulu	Sundari	

== Awards ==
National Film Awards

- 1979 – National Film Award for Best Actress for Pasi

Filmfare Awards South

- 1978 – Filmfare Best Kannada Actress Award for Aparichita
- 1979 – Filmfare Best Tamil Actress Award for Pasi

Kerala State Film Award

- 1971 – Best Female Child Artist for Yogammullaval and Aval Alpam Vaikippoyi
- 1977 – Second Best Actress for Ormakal Marikkumo
- 1978 – Best Actress for Ente Neelakasham
