= Yogamullaval =

- Directed by: C. V. Shankar
- Written by: C. V. Shankar
- Screenplay by: C. V. Shankar
- Produced by: U. Parvathibhai
- Starring: Muthukulam Raghavan Pillai; Shobha; Baby; C. V. Shankar
- Cinematography: Chandran
- Edited by: K. Sankunni
- Music by: R. K. Shekhar
- Production company: UPS Productions
- Distributed by: Munthas films
- Release date: 10 December 1971
- Country: India
- Language: Malayalam

Yogamullaval is a 1971 Indian Malayalam-language film, written and directed by C. V. Shankar and produced by U. Parvathibhai. The film stars Muthukulam Raghavan Pillai, Shobha, Baby and C. V. Shankar. The film had musical score by R. K. Shekhar.

== Cast ==
- Muthukulam Raghavan Pillai
- Shobha
- Baby
- C. V. Shankar
- T. S. Muthaiah
- Prem Navas
- Abbas
- Bahadoor
- G. K. Pillai
- K. P. Ummer
- Khadeeja
- Meena
- Ramankutty
- Thodupuzha Radhakrishnan
- Vanchiyoor Radha
- Vijayalatha
- Saroja
- Vijayalakshmi

== Soundtrack ==
The music was composed by R. K. Shekhar and the lyrics were written by Sreekumaran Thampi.

No.	Song	Singers	Lyrics	Length (m:ss)
1	"Kaattumullapenninoru"	L. R. Eeswari	Sreekumaran Thampi	
2	"Neelasaagara Theeram"	S. Janaki, S. P. Balasubrahmanyam	Sreekumaran Thampi	
3	"Omanathaamara Poothathaano"	M. Balamuralikrishna	Sreekumaran Thampi	
4	"Padarnnu Padarnnu"	S. Janaki, S. P. Balasubrahmanyam	Sreekumaran Thampi	
