= Kilinjalgal =

- Theatrical release poster
- Directed by: Durai
- Written by: Durai
- Produced by: G. Lalitha
- Starring: Mohan; Poornima Bhagyaraj; Dilip
- Cinematography: V. Manohar
- Edited by: M. Vellaichamy; R. Krishnamurthy
- Music by: T. Rajendar
- Production company: Sunitha Cini Arts
- Release date: 25 December 1981
- Country: India
- Language: Tamil

Kilinjalgal (transl. Clams) is a 1981 Indian Tamil-language romance film, written and directed by Durai. The film stars Mohan, Poornima Bhagyaraj and Dilip. It revolves around two lovers whose romance is opposed by their families due to differences in religion.

Kilinjalgal was released on 25 December 1981. The film was a silver jubilee hit and ran for 175 days at the box office. The film was remade in Hindi again by Durai as Do Gulab.

== Plot ==
Babu, a Hindu, falls in love with Julie, a Christian. However, both the families are against this love due to differences in religion. Despite heavy opposition, Babu and Julie remain adamant in their decision. Julie's father Stephen locks her in a room while Babu's father Manikkam also does not permit him to move out of his home. To everyone's shock, Julie commits suicide. Hearing this, Babu rushes to the crematorium and dies when Julie's corpse is being cremated.

== Cast ==
- Mohan as Babu
- Poornima Bhagyaraj as Julie
- Dilip as Jana
- V. K. Ramasamy as Station master
- V. Gopalakrishnan as Stephen
- Bayilvan Ranganathan
- G. Srinivasan as Manikkam
- Gokulnath as Church Father
- Rajavelu as Inspector
- Sukumari as Stella
- S. N. Parvathy as Uma's mother
- Vanchiyoor Radha as Babu's mother
- Poornima (credited as Sudha) as Usha
- Senthil
- Jolly Abraham in Guest appearance

== Soundtrack ==
The music was composed by T. Rajendar who also wrote the lyrics. The song "Vizhigal Medaiyam" is set in Revati raga.

Song	Singers	Length
"Kilai Ella Marangalil Nizhal"	P. Jayachandran	04:33
"Vizhigal Meydaiyam Imaigal"	Dr. Kalyan T Subrahmanyam, S. Janaki	04:37
"Azhaginil Vilainthadu Mazhaienil"	S. P. Balasubrahmanyam	04:31
"Chinna Chinna Kanna Sethi Sollum"	P. Susheela	04:17

== Release and reception ==
Kilinjalgal was released on 25 December 1981. Nalini Sastry of Kalki called the story outdated. The film was a silver jubilee hit and ran for 175 days at the box office.
