= Oru Kudumbathin Kathai =

- Theatrical release poster
- Directed by: Durai
- Screenplay by: Durai
- Dialogue by: Raja Srinivasan
- Story by: Durai
- Produced by: R. Durairaj; J. Balaiah
- Starring: R. Muthuraman; Sumithra; Nanditha Bose
- Cinematography: V. Manohar
- Edited by: M. R. Bhaskaran
- Music by: Shankar–Ganesh
- Production company: Sulochana Pictures
- Release date: 26 September 1975
- Country: India
- Language: Tamil

Oru Kudumbathin Kathai (transl. The story of a family) is a 1975 Indian Tamil-language drama film directed and co-written by Durai. The film stars R. Muthuraman, Sumithra and Nanditha Bose, with R. S. Manohar, Srikanth, Thengai Srinivasan, Manorama, Pandari Bai and C. K. Saraswathi in supporting roles. It was released on 26 September 1975, and became a success.

== Cast ==
- R. Muthuraman
- Sumithra
- Nanditha Bose
- R. S. Manohar
- Srikanth
- Thengai Srinivasan
- Manorama
- Pandari Bai
- C. K. Saraswathi
- V. R. Thilagam
- Padmini
- Ramani
- Pushpamala
- Samikannu

== Soundtrack ==
The music was composed by Shankar–Ganesh, with lyrics by Vaali.

Track listing
No.	Title	Singer(s)	Length
1.	"Karpanaiyil"	P. Susheela
2.	"Engal Kudumbam"	S. P. Balasubrahmanyam
3.	"Maharajan Vandhaan"	P. Susheela
4.	"Malai Saralil"	K. J. Yesudas, Sasirekha

== Release and reception ==
The film was released on 26 September 1975, and became a success. Kanthan of Kalki praised the acting of Muthuraman, Sumithra, Manohar and Srikanth and also praised Durai's direction but panned the acting of Nanditha Bose and the song placements.
