= Mana Voori Pandavulu =

Manavoori Pandavulu
- Theatrical poster
- Directed by: Bapu
- Written by: Mullapudi Venkata Ramana
- Based on: Paduvaaralli Pandavaru
- Produced by: Jaya Krishna
- Starring: Krishnam Raju; Chiranjeevi; Murali Mohan; Rao Gopal Rao; Gudapati Srinivasa Rao
- Cinematography: Balu Mahendra
- Music by: K. V. Mahadevan
- Release date: 9 November 1978
- Country: India
- Language: Telugu

Manavoori Pandavulu (transl. Our village's Pandavas) is a 1978 Indian Telugu-language film directed by Bapu and written by Mullapudi Venkata Ramana, dealing with the struggle against the feudal system in their own unique way. The film is a remake of Kannada film Paduvaaralli Pandavaru (1978) directed by Puttanna Kanagal and stars Krishnam Raju, Chiranjeevi and Murali Mohan. In 1980, he also remade it in Hindi as Hum Paanch starring Mithun Chakraborty.

== Synopsis ==
The film revolves around Krishna (played by Krishnam Raju) who brings together an unlikely group of 5 youngsters to help in creating awareness among their villagers to revolt against the cruel village head, Rambhoopal (Rao Gopal Rao) and his henchmen. Even though being a revolutionary theme, the movie was wonderfully made without the usual tone that accompanies the leftist movies and fashioned on the lines of the great mythology Mahabharata.

Mana Voori Pandavulu is the story of five youngsters come together in village to protest against the village chief because village chief is cruel he receive 2x rent from the village farmers there income totally depend on rain, when villagers told that whole past story to the five youngsters the first person who protest against the village chief is Parthu (Chiranjeevi ) the four come together. The village chief tries to kill them but in the end he is vanquished.

== Cast ==
- Krishnam Raju as Krishna
- Chiranjeevi as Parthu
- Prasad Babu as Bheemanna
- Gudapati Srinivasa Rao as Sreenu
- Murali Mohan as Ramudu
- Rao Gopal Rao as Rambhoopal
- Allu Ramalingaiah as Kannappa
- Shoba as Sundari
- Geetha as Sinni
- Kanta Rao as Dharmayya
- Sarathi as Rambhoopal's son
- Jhansi as Santhamma
- Halam as Oorvasi
- Madhavi
- Bhanuchander
- Jayamalini
- Mada Venkateswara Rao

== Production ==
The film was completely shot at Gummalladodi village.

== Soundtrack ==
All music is composed by K. V. Mahadevan.

No.	Title	Lyrics	Singer(s)	Length
1.	"Jendaa Pai Kapiraju"	Arudra	S. P. Balasubrahmanyam, G. Anand, M. S. Ramarao	3:13
2.	"Manchiki Cheddaki"	Arudra	S. P. Balasubrahmanyam	2:16
3.	"Nalla Nallani"	Kosaraju	G. Anand, S. P. Sailaja	3:26
4.	"Orey Pichchi Sannaasee"	Arudra	S. P. Balasubrahmanyam	3:39
5.	"Pandavulu"	Arudra	S. P. Balasubrahmanyam, G. Anand, M. S. Ramarao	3:33
6.	"Piriki Mandhu Thaagi"	Arudra	S. P. Balasubrahmanyam	4:08
7.	"Sitralu Seyaro"	Arudra	S. P. Balasubrahmanyam	3:35
8.	"Swagatham Suswagatham"	Arudra	Rao Gopal Rao, P. Susheela	4:33
Total length:				27:23

== Reception ==
Katakataala Rudrayya and Mana Voori Pandavulu were released within a gap of 10 days and both the films became blockbusters.

Film Companion while compiling the 25 Greatest Telugu Films of the Decade, called Rangasthalam as an updated version of this film.

== Awards ==
- Rashtrapati Award - Krishnam Raju
- Filmfare Best Film Award (Telugu) - Krishnam Raju & Jaya Krishna
- Nandi Award for Best Cinematographer - Balu Mahendra
