= Oru Vidukadhai Oru Thodarkadhai =

- DVD cover
- Directed by: M. A. Kaja
- Written by: Ram-Raheem; Rajshekar
- Starring: Vijayan; Shoba; Vijay Babu
- Cinematography: T. V. Balu
- Edited by: M. Vellachamy, M. Kesavan
- Music by: Gangai Amaran
- Production company: Sri Devipriya Films
- Release date: 1 September 1979
- Country: India
- Language: Tamil

Oru Vidukadhai Oru Thodarkadhai (transl. A riddle; A serial) or (transl. A riddle is a never ending story) is a 1979 Indian Tamil-language film directed by M. A. Kaja. The film stars Vijayan, Shoba and Vijay Babu. It was remade in Malayalam as Oru Thira Pinneyum Thira.

== Plot ==
Thyagarajan and Kamala are in love but are separated due to unforeseen events in their lives. Kamala has moved to New Delhi and is married off to a philandering husband who has no affection for her. Years later, Thyagarajan joins an office in a managerial role and, to his surprise, finds that Kamala works under him. As time rolls Kamala learns that Thyagarajan's wife, a sports fan, has deserted him for his close friend Bhaskar, a basketball player. The erstwhile lovers unhappy in their personal lives become supportive of each other. The rest of the story unveils whether Kamala and Thyagarajan find happiness in their lives or remain unhappy.

== Cast ==
- Vijayan as Thyagarajan (Thiyagu)
- Shoba as Kamala
- Vijay Babu as Bhaskar
- Aparna as Lailtha
- Master Sekhar as Mohan
- Suruli Rajan as Peon Munusamy
- Gandhimathi as Munusamy's first wife
- Sachu as Munusamy's second wife
- Meera as Meena

== Soundtrack ==
The soundtrack was composed by Gangai Amaran making his debut as composer with this film. Amaran revealed his debut film as composer Malargalile Oru Malligai was unreleased despite the soundtrack being released, so Oru Vidukathai Oru Thodarkathai became his first film as composer to be released. All songs were written by Vaali and Amaran. The songs "Nayagan Avan Puram" and "Vidukathai Ondru" became hugely popular.

| Song | Singers | Length |
|---|---|---|
| "Naayagan Avan" | K. J. Yesudas, S. Janaki | 4:13 |
| "Adi Ennoda Vaadi" | Pooranee, S. P. Balasubrahmanyam, S.P. Sailaja | 4:24 |
| "Vidukathai Ondru" | S. Janaki, S. P. Balasubrahmanyam | 5:41 |
| "Radha Nee Enge" | S. Janaki, S. P. Balasubrahmanyam | |

== Reception ==
Kausikan of Kalki gave a negative review, saying director Kaja's audacity is frowned upon and he should not continue with this kind of stories.
