= Mantri Gari Viyyankudu =

- Theatrical poster
- Directed by: Bapu
- Written by: Mullapudi Venkata Ramana dialogues)
- Screenplay by: Mullapudi Venkata Ramana
- Produced by: Jaya Krishna
- Starring: Chiranjeevi; Poornima Jayaram
- Cinematography: Lok Singh
- Edited by: Anil Malnad
- Music by: Ilaiyaraaja
- Production company: Muddu Art Movies
- Release date: 4 November 1983
- Running time: 133 minutes
- Country: India
- Language: Telugu

Mantri Gari Viyyankudu (transl. Minister's co-father-in-law) is a 1983 Telugu-language film released directed by Bapu and stars Chiranjeevi in the lead role and Poornima Jayaram, Nirmalamma and Allu Ramalingaiah in important roles. This was actress Poornima’s first and only Telugu film as a leading lady, after which she made a comeback so many years later to supporting roles. The story of this film has some similarities to the 1971 Tamil film, Kumarikkoottam, starring MGR and Jayalalitha.

== Plot ==
Kobbarikayala Subba Rayudu (Allu Ramalingaiah) is a self-made millionaire, who after attaining a high status, forgets the people who helped him initially and spends life counting his successes. A chance meeting several years later between his son, Siva (Subhalekha Sudhakar) and his former friend Ravulapalem Rambhadrayya's (Raavi Kondala Rao) daughter (Tulasi) leads to both of them falling in love. Subba Rao invites his friend and his wife Annapoornamma (Nirmalamma) to his mansion and insults them reminding of their lower status in society. The rest of the movie is about how Annapoornamma- who challenges Subba Rao that he would one day come to her house begging for their help - gets it done with the main lead taken by her son Babji (Chiranjeevi) with help from others.

== Cast ==
- Chiranjeevi as Babji
- Poornima Jayaram Anuradha
- Allu Ramalingaiah as Kobbarikayala Subba Rao
- Nirmalamma as Annapoornamma
- Nutan Prasad
- Raavi Kondala Rao as Ravulapalem Rambhadrayya
- Subhalekha Sudhakar as Siva
- Tulasi as Suseela
- Kaikala Satyanarayana as Kappala Appa Rao
- Rallapalli
- Srilakshmi
- Potti Prasad
- K. Venkata Rao as minister (special appearance)
- Vijayan (special appearance)

== Production ==
While Bapu-Ramana wanted to have K. V. Mahadevan (who was their usual choice) as the composer, producer Jaya Krishna insisted on having Ilaiyaraaja as the composer, since Ilaiyaraaja-Chiranjeevi's first combination, Abhilasha (1983) was a major musical and commercial success. According to Ramana, the film was remade from a Malayalam film. Mantri Gari Viyyankudu was the only movie with Chiranjeevi-Bapu/Ramana combination. Heroine Poornima Jayaram was the top heroine in Malayalam and was introduced to Telugu movies through this movie. The budget was 22 lakh rupees [2.2 million] and Chiranjeevi's remuneration was 1.5 lakh rupees. Both Ilaiyaraaja and Poornima Jayaram were given 60,000 Rupees. Cinematographer Lok Singh was paid 50,000 INR. The shooting was done mostly in and around Chennai except for a couple of songs [Emani Ne Cheli Paduduno] and one fight, which were shot in Ooty. The shooting was completed in 40 days.

== Soundtrack ==
All songs were composed by Maestro Ilaiyaraaja. Ilayaraja later recreated "Emani Ne" as "Kaise Kahoon" for Hindi film Shiva (2006).

Song	Playback Singer/s	Lyrics	Picturised on	Playtime
"Emani Ne Cheli Paduduno"	S. P. Balasubrahmanyam & S. Janaki	Veturi	Chiranjeevi & Poornima Jayaram	4:26
"Chi Chipa"	S. P. Balasubrahmanyam	Veturi	Chiranjeevi & Poornima Jayaram	4:22
"Sala Sala Nanu Kavvinchanela"	S. P. Balasubrahmanyam & S. Janaki	Veturi	Chiranjeevi & Poornima Jayaram and Subhalekha Sudhakar & Tulasi	4:24
"Manaku Dosti Okate Asthi Raa"	S. P. Balasubrahmanyam	Veturi	Chiranjeevi	4:15
"Manasa Sirasa"	S. P. Balasubrahmanyam & S. Janaki	Veturi	Allu Ramalingaiah, Poornima Jayaram, Subhalekha Sudhakar & Tulasi	4:29
"Koluvainade"	S. P. Balasubrahmanyam	Veturi	Chiranjeevi, Allu Ramalingaiah, Poornima Jayaram, Subhalekha Sudhakar & Nutan Prasad	4:17
"Ammagade Bujjigade"	S. P. Balasubrahmanyam & S. Janaki	Veturi	Chiranjeevi & Poornima Jayaram	4:26

== Reception ==
The movie was both a critical and commercial success and completed 50 days in most of the centers it was released. While the movie was the first foray for Bapu/Ramana combination into pure commercial cinema, it was praised for still having the Bapu/Ramana touch. The movie became a rage among youth, especially the college scenes and the songs endeared the youth of Andhra to the movie. The movie would have done even better had it not released a week after Khaidi, which was breaking all kinds of industry records at that time.
