= Vijay Babu (actor, born 1951) =

Indian actor and producer

- Born: Venkateshwar Reddy; 1951 (age 74–75); Andhra Pradesh, India
- Occupation: Actor
- Years active: 1978-present
- Spouse: Prasanna
- Children: 2 including Ramana (son)

Vijay Babu (or Vijaybabu) is an Indian actor and producer who works primarily in Tamil cinema. He was most active in the early 80s and later switched to a successful career in television serials. His son Ramana is also an actor working in Tamil cinema.

His popular films include Oru Veedu Oru Ulagam, Oru Vidukadhai Oru Thodarkadhai and Padikkadavan. In 1991, he produced a movie title Eswari under the banner of Sreesakthi Films Combines, with Anand Babu and Gautami as the leading pair.

== Filmography ==
- This is an incomplete list you may help to expand the list

=== Tamil ===
- Oru Veedu Oru Ulagam - 1978
- Oru Vidukadhai Oru Thodarkadhai - 1979
- Oru Koyil Iru Dheebangal - 1979
- Kandhar Alangaram - 1979
- Sri Devi - 1980
- Kumari Pennin Ullathile - 1980
- Madhavi Vandhal - 1980
- Paruvathin Vasalile - 1980
- Meenakshi - 1980
- Muyalakku Moonu Kaal - 1980
- Rusi Kanda Poonai - 1980
- Pournami Nilavil- 1980
- Engal Vathiyar as Ragunath - 1980
- Veli Thandiya Velladu - 1980
- Kadavulin Theerpu - 1981
- Meendum Sandhippom - 1981
- Engamma Maharani - 1981
- Tharayil Vaazhum Meengal - 1981
- Kaalam Orunaal Maarum - 1981
- Thunaivi - 1982
- Kasappum Inippum - 1983
- Padikkadavan - 1985
- Kalamellam Un Madiyil - 1986
- Agni Theertham - 1990
- Aarathi Edungadi - 1990
- Chinna Mani - 1995
- Priyamaana Thozhi - 2003
- Brahmadeva - 2009
- Uthamaputhiran - 2010
- Aathi Narayana - 2012
- Ajantha - 2012
- Puriyadha Anandam Puthithaga Arambam - 2015
- Chakra - 2021

=== Malayalam ===
- Anupallavi - 1979

=== Telugu ===
- Arey - 2005

=== Kannada ===
- Ajantha - 2009

== Television ==
- 2002-2003 Varam (Sun TV)
- 2005-2006 Anandham (Sun TV)
- 2012-2013 Aaha (Vijay TV)
- 2023-2024 Poova Thalaya (Sun TV)
- 2026 Moondru Mudichu (Sun TV)
