= Sumithra (actress) =

Indian actress

- Born: 18 September 1953 (age 73); Thrissur, Kerala, India
- Occupation: Actress
- Years active: 1972–present
- Spouse: D. Rajendra Babu (m. 1980; died 2013)
- Children: Umashankari; Nakshatra

Sumithra (born 18 September 1953) is an Indian actress. She has appeared in Tamil, Malayalam, Kannada and Telugu language films. She acted as the lead heroine in films between 1972 and 1985. She became well known for her roles as a mother from the 1990s onwards.

== Early life ==
Sumithra was born to Raghavan Nair and Janaki at Thrissur, Kerala. She has three brothers, her father was working in an oil refining company. When she was doing her schooling, she learnt dance from Murugappan Master, who was the guide to actress K. R. Vijaya at that time. Sumithra is a good classical dancer.

A 19-year old Sumithra started her career in a small role in the Malayalam film Nrithasala (1972); director A. B. Raj is the first to have noticed Sumithra's talent. A year later Sumithra made her debut as heroine in the Malayalam film Nirmalayam. She has acted in over 200 films in Tamil, Malayalam, Kannada and Telugu languages. In Tamil, Avalum Penn Thaane (1974) was her first movie. In Kannada, her first movie was Mugiyada Kathe (1975) which is known for the evergreen song Kangalu Vandane Helide. She has acted with several leading heroes such as Vishnuvardhan and Rajesh in Kannada and Sivaji Ganesan, Jaishankar, Sivakumar, Rajnikanth and Kamal Haasan in Tamil. Sumithra has acted as heroine with Rajani and Kamal and later as mother to them as well. She's performed supporting roles in hundreds of Kannada, Tamil, Malayalam and Telugu movies till date.

== Personal life ==
She was married to noted Kannada film director D. Rajendra Babu (since 1980) and has two daughters Umashankari (born in 1982) and Nakshatra (born in 1990). Umashankari made her entry as lead heroine through the Kannada movie Uppi Dada M.B.B.S. and has also acted in Chikkamma telecast on Udaya TV. Nakshatra debuted as lead actress in the Tamil movie Doo.

== Filmography ==
=== Tamil ===
This list is incomplete; you can help by expanding it.

- Avalum Penn Thaane (1974)
- Oru Kudumbathin Kadhai (1975)
- Lalitha (1976)
- Mogam Muppadhu Varusham (1976)
- Bhuvana Oru Kelvi Kuri (1977)
- Ragupathi Raagava Rajaram (1977)
- Nandha En Nila (1977)
- Annan Oru Koyil (1977)
- Chittu Kuruvi (1977)
- Nee Vazhva Vendum (1977)
- Nizhal Nijamagiradhu (1978) as Indumathi
- Ival Oru Seethai (1978)
- Iraivan Kodutha Varam (1978)
- Kannamoochi (1978)
- Machanai Paartheengala (1978)
- Paavathin Sambalam (1978)
- Vattathukkul Chaduram (1978)
- Sonnadhu Nee Thanaa (1978)
- Justice Gopinath (1978)
- Rudhra Thaandavam (1978)
- Kannan Oru Kai Kuzhanthai (1978)
- Muthal Iravu (1979)
- Kadavul Amaitha Medai (1979)
- Mugathil Mugam Paarkalaam (1979)
- Aadu Pambe (1979)
- Thevaigal (1979)
- Anbe Sangeetha (1979)
- Nee Sirithal Naan Sirippen (1979)
- Chellakili (1979)
- Mazhalai Pattalam (1980)
- Ore Mutham (1980)
- Ponnukku Yaar Kaaval (1980)
- Paakku Vethalai (1981)
- Tiruppangal (1981)
- Pattam Padhavi (1981)
- Deiva Thirumanangal-Srinivasa Kalyanam (1981)
- Vasanthakalam (1981)
- Nellikanni (1981)
- Engamma Maharani (1981)
- Sangili (1982)
- Anney Anney (1983)
- Aval Oru Kaaviyam (1983)
- Kuyile Kuyile (1984)
- Then Koodu (1984)
- Antha Uravukku Satchi (1984)
- Veli (1985)
- Kanni Rasi (1985)
- Mayavi (1985)
- Pournami Alaigal (1985)
- Yemaatrathe Yemaaraathe (1985)
- Aasha (1985)
- Oru Manithan Oru Manaivi (1986)
- Mahasakthi Mariamman (1986)
- Velicham (1987)
- Veerapandiyan (1987)
- Michael Raj (1987)
- Thaye Neeye Thunai (1987)
- Poove Ilam Poove (1987)
- Agni Natchathiram (1988)
- Maappillai Sir (1988)
- Panakkaran (1989)
- Sattathin Thirappu Vizhaa (1989)
- Meenakshi Thiruvilayadal (1989)
- Velai Kidaichuduchu (1990)
- Naan Pudicha Mappillai (1991)
- Nattai Thirudathey (1991)
- Chinna Thambi (1991)
- MGR Nagaril (1991)
- Pillai Paasam (1991)
- Karpoora Mullai (1991)
- Singaravelan (1992)
- Pandithurai (1992)
- Sathyam Adhu Nitchayam (1992)
- Idhu Namma Bhoomi (1992)
- Kattalai (1993)
- Enga Muthalali (1993)
- Maravan (1993)
- Airport (1993)
- Pagaivan (1997)
- Arasiyal (1997)
- Unnudan (1998)
- Kallazhagar (1999)
- Jodi (1999)
- Vadagupatti Maapillai (2001)
- King (2002)
- Saamy (2003)
- Dharmapuri (2006)
- Thullal (2007)
- Veerappu (2007)
- Indiralohathil Na Azhagappan (2008)
- Singam (2010)
- Singam 2 (2013)
- Chandra (2013)
- Veeram (2014)
- Muthina Kathirika (2016)
- Ilamai Oonjal (2016)
- Singam 3 (2017)
- Saamy 2 (2018)
- Raajavamsam (2021)
- Valimai (2022)

=== Malayalam ===
- Postmane Kananilla (1972) as Amrutham
- Nirthasala (1972) as Sharada
- Theerthayathra (1972) as Nangyarukutty
- Thenaruvi (1973) as Ichira
- Nirmalyam (1973) as Ammini
- Nellu (1974) as Sephiya
- Honeymoon (1974)
- Chandrakantham (1974)
- Thumbolarcha (1974) as Thamara
- Nagaram Sagaram (1974)
- Durga (1974)
- Udayam Kizhakku Thanne (1974)
- Chakravakam (1974) as Padmini
- Madura Pathinezhu (1975)
- Neela Ponman (1975) as Veluthamma
- Manishada (1975)
- Swimming Pool (1976)
- Vazhi Vilakku (1976)
- Aruthu (1976)
- Appoppan (1976) as Amminikutty
- Neela Sari (1976)
- Sakhakkale Munnoottu (1977)
- Chakravarthini (1977)
- Niraparayum Nilavilakkum (1977)
- Abhinivesham (1977) as Sindhu
- Varadakshina (1977)
- Njaan Njaan Maathram (1978)
- Jalatharangam (1978)
- Adikkadi (1978)
- Lava (1980) as Sindhu
- Ivan Oru Simham (1982)
- Piriyilla Naam (1984) as Sumathi
- Muthodu Muthu (1984) as Malathi
- Ivide Ingane (1984) as Elsi
- Amme Narayana (1984) as Ponni, Kannappa's wife
- Swantham Sarika (1984) as Bharati
- Kadamattathachan (1984) as Marykutti
- Thacholi Thankappan (1984) as Sujatha
- Ningalil Oru Sthree (1984)
- Aarorumariyathe (1984) as Thulasi
- Aalkkoottathil Thaniye (1984) as Seethalakshmi
- Lakshamanarekha (1984) as Vilasini Menon
- Parayanumvayya Parayathirikkanumvayya (1985) as Sathi
- Azhiyatha Bandhangal (1985) at Sulochana
- Eeran Sandhya (1985)
- Akkachide Kunjuvava (1985)
- Snehicha Kuttathinu (1985)
- Ee Thanalil Ithiri Nerum (1985)
- Sannaham (1985)
- Achuvettante Veedu (1987) as Beena
- Onnam Maanm Poomaanam (1987) as Sasi's wife
- Ulsavapittennu (1989) as Ettathi
- Ente Sooryaputhrikku (1991) as Dr. Srinivas's mother
- Daivathinte Makan (2000) as Janaki
- Saphalam (2003) as Subhadra
- Calcutta News (2008)
- Bharya Onnu Makkal Moonnu (2009) as Saraswathiamma
- Vaidooryam (2012) as Sujatha
- Monayi Angane Aanayi (2014) as Maya's mother
- Village Guys (2015)

=== Kannada ===
- Mugiyada Kathe (1976)
- Makkala Sainya (1980)
- Rajeshwari (1981)
- Asambhava (1985)
- Karna (1986)
- Ravi Moodi Banda (1986)
- Mr. Raja (1987)
- Sathyam Shivam Sundaram (1987) as Janaki
- Ondagi Balu (1989)
- Sididedda Gandu (1990)
- Ramachaari (1991)
- Gopi Krishna (1992)
- Guru Brahma (1992)
- Sri Ramachandra (1992)
- Ranjitha (1993)
- Ananda Jyothi (1993)
- Adhipathi (1994)
- Jenina Hole (1997)
- Cheluva (1997)
- Kurubana Rani (1998)
- Mangalyam Tantunanena (1998)
- Shanti Shanti Shanti (1998)
- Jaidev (1998)
- Premotsava (1999)
- O Premave (1999)
- Chora Chittha Chora (1999)
- Chamundi (2000)
- Mr. Harishchandra (2001)
- Maduve Aagona Baa (2001)
- Dhumm (2002)
- Dhruva (2002)
- Appu (2002)
- Neenandre Ishta (2003)
- Sri Ram (2003)
- Abhi (2003)
- Annavru (2003)
- Sahukara (2004)
- Pakkadmane Hudugi (2004)
- Sarvabhouma (2004)
- Mellusire Savigana (2004)
- Auto Shankar (2005)
- Sye (2005)
- Encounter Dayanayak (2005)
- Uppi Dada M.B.B.S. (2005)
- Rishi (2005)
- Annavru (2006)
- Ajay (2007)
- Milana (2007)
- Chamundi (2007)
- Mussanje Maathu (2008)
- Gokula (2009)
- Jackie (2010)
- Prema Chandrama (2011)
- Chandra (2013)
- Myna (2013)
- Brahma (2014)
- Endendigu (2015)
- Boxer (2015)
- Chamak (2017)
- Tarak(2017)

=== Telugu ===
- Andala Ramudu (1973)
- Challani Talli (1975)
- Jaruguthunna Katha (1977)
- Vaaralabbai (1981)
- Manasa Veena (1984)
- Sravana Sandhya (1986) as Dr. Lalitha
- Brahma Rudrulu (1986)
- Trimurtulu (1987)
- Sardar Krishnama Naidu (1987) as Vasantha
- Aha Naa-Pellanta! (1987)
- Vijetha Vikram (1987)
- Rudraveena (1988)
- Geethanjali (1989)
- Bobbili Raja (1990)
- Bujji Gadi Babai (1990)
- Adavilo Anna (1997)
- Pelli Chesukundam (1997)
- Manasichi Choodu (1998)
- Samarasimha Reddy (1999)
- Bhalevadivi Basu (2001)
- Santosham (2002)
- Jai Chiranjeeva (2005)
- Super (2005)
- Raraju (2006)
- Ganesh (2009)
- Poola Rangadu (2012)
- Brahma (2014)
- Power (2014)
- Prematho Mee Karthik (2017)
- Ammammagarillu (2018)
- Entha Manchivaadavuraa (2020)
- Seetha Payanam (2026)

== Television ==
- Micro Thodar Macro Sinthanaigal - Plastic Vizhuthugal {Tamil serial}
