= Malaysia Vasudevan =

Indian playback singer (1944-2011)

- Born: 15 June 1944; Kuala Selangor, Selangor Darul Ehsan, Federated Malay States
- Died: 20 February 2011 (aged 66); Chennai, Tamil Nadu, India
- Other name: Sathu Arumugam Nair
- Occupations: Film director, playback singer, actor
- Years active: 1960–2011
- Spouse: Usha (m.1970-2011)
- Children: 3 including Yugendran, Prashanthini

Vasudevan (15 June 1944 – 20 February 2011), popularly known as Malaysia Vasudevan, was a Malaysian Indian playback singer and actor. Born in the town of Kuala Selangor in the Federated Malay States (present day Malaysia), he moved to Madras, Tamil Nadu (now Chennai) to work in films. His voice was recently revived using AI in the song "Manasilaayo" for the 2024 Tamil film Vettaiyan.

== Early life ==
Vasudevan's parents were from Palakkad. Chattu Nair of Ottappalam and Ammalu of Polpulli, along with their families migrated to British Malaya in search of a livelihood. After a few years, Chattu Nair married Ammalu in an arranged marriage. Vasudevan was born on 15 June 1944 as their eighth and youngest child.

Vasudevan started singing on stage when he was eight. Vasudevan was also interested in acting.

When Vasudevan grew up, he attached himself to Tamil drama troupes in Malaysia as an actor and singer. The producers of one of his plays Ratha Paei, wanted to make it into a film. Vasudevan came with the group to Chennai and acted in the film Raththa Paei. He even sang a song for the film under the baton of G. K. Venkatesh, for whom Ilaiyaraaja was working as the assistant.

== Professional career ==
=== Playback singer ===
Malaysia Vasudevan's first major song was in the film Delhi to Madras, that starred Jaishankar and Srividya. It was a comedy song "Paalu Vikkira Padma Un Paalu Romba Suthhama?", for the music director V. Kumar. He joined the Pavalar Brothers troupe which was run by Ilaiyaraaja and his brothers.

During a stage performance, music director M. S. Viswanathan heard Vasudevan and gave him a small piece of a song in Bharatha Vilas (he sang for the Punjabi in "Indhiya Naadu En Veedu") and then a song in Thalai Prasavam. His first big break came when Kunnakudi Vaidyanathan made him sing "Kaalam Seyyum Vilaiyattu" in Kumasthavin Magal. Vasudevan was rechristened Malaysia Vasudevan by A. P. Nagarajan in this film.

Later, when Ilaiyaraaja debuted in the Tamil film industry with Annakili, he was asked to sing in the film, and after "Aattukutti Muttai Ittu" from 16 Vayathinile happened, Malaysia Vasudevan never looked back. Ilaiyaraaja backed him until he became a star singer.

Under the music direction of M. S. Viswanathan, Malaysia Vasudevan recorded several songs in Tamil cinema. These include “Ezhudhugiral Oru Pudhukkavithai” from Saranaalayam and “Enniyirundhadhu Eadera” from Andha 7 Naatkal. He also sang in Billa, contributing to its soundtrack.

Vasydevan sang songs, like "Kanna Thorakkanum Saami", or "Nila Kaayudhu" and emotional songs like "Oru Thanga Rathathhil" (Dharma Yuddham), "Allithhandha Bhoomi Annai Allava" (Nandu), "Adi Aadu Poongodiye" (Kali), "Vaa Vaa Vasanthamey" (Puthu Kavithai), "Pattuvanna Rosavam" (Kannipparuvathile) and "Ponmaana Thedi Naanum Poovodu" (Enga Oor Rasathi). He also sang more folksy tunes for Shankar–Ganesh. In the nineties, he sang several songs for A. R. Rahman, including "Then Kizhakku" (Kizhakku Cheemayile) and "Monalisa Monalisa" (Mr. Romeo). The song "Poo Pookum Osai" (Minsara Kanavu) featured Vasudevan's voice in the chorus.

Vasudevan worked with many music directors such as M. S. Viswanathan, Ilaiyaraaja, Shankar–Ganesh, Deva, A. R. Rahman and Vidyasagar.

He also lent his voice for a few albums. The most notable among them is Disco Disco (1987), a collaboration with composer Dilip (A. R. Rahman) and playback singer K. S. Chithra. This was the first album production of A. R. Rahman. Disco Disco Vol 2 was released later, though it was not as popular.

=== Music direction ===
Malaysia Vasudevan composed music for a few movies, including Uravugal, Itho Varugiren, Samanthi Poo (1980), Pakku Vethilai (1981), Ayiram Kaigal, Aaraavathu Kurukku Theru (1984), Kolusu (1985), and Rajaavin Paarvai (1988).

=== Direction ===
He has directed a film called Nee Sirithal Deepavali (1990).

=== Acting career ===
Malaysia Vasudevan acted in nearly 85 films. Veteran Tamil director A. P. Nagarajan christened him "Malaysia Vasudevan". Some of his notable films include Oorkavalan (with Rajinikanth), Mudhal Vasantham (with Sathyaraj), Oomai Vizhigal (with Vijayakanth), Kathanayagan (with Pandiyarajan), Oru Kaidhiyin Diary (with Kamal Haasan), Jallikattu, Thiruda Thiruda, Amaidhi Padai, Poove Unakkaga, Badri,Punnagai Desam and Kokki. He also acted in tele-serials.

=== Writer ===
Malaysia Vasudevan wrote a book of poems called Ennam Thondriyathu Ezhutha Thoondiyathu in 2010.

=== Last projects ===
Vasudevan's last song was "Happy", from the film Bale Pandiya (2010), in the music of Devan Ekambaram. His last film as an actor, Ithanai Naalaai Engiruthaai, is yet to be released. The last song he wrote was "Devathaiye" for the film Balam (2009), in the music of his son Yugendran Vasudevan Nair.

== Personal life ==
Malaysia Vasudevan married Annaporani, also known as Usha Vasudevan, on 26 January 1976. Malaysia Vasudevan has three children Yugendran, Prashanthini and Pavithra. Yugendran is an actor and Prashanthini is a playback singer.

== Awards ==
He was awarded the Kalaimamani by the Tamil Nadu Government. He was also a two-time winner of the Tamil Nadu State Film Award for Best Male Playback.

== Death ==
Vasudevan died from the gangrene on 20 February 2011 in Chennai, Tamil Nadu.

== Notable discography ==
- "Attukkutti Muttayittu" (16 Vayathinile)
- "Sevvnthi Poomudicha" (16 Vayathinile)
- "Kovil Mani Oosai Thannai" (Kizakke Pogum Rail)
- "Alli Thandha Bhoomi" (Nandu)
- "Aagayam Bhoomi Rendum" (Samanthipoo)
- "Shankara Shiva" (Rajarishi)
- "Pothuvaga En Manasu" (Murattu Kaalai)
- "Kodai Kaala Kaatre" (Panneer Pushpangal)
- "Um Mele Oru Kannu" (Naan Mahaan Alla)
- "Mama Varalama", "Nottu" (Naanayam Illatha Naanayam) (1984)
- "Aasai Nooruvagai" (Adutha Varisu)
- "Oru Kootukiliyaga" (Padikkadavan)
- "Unna Partha Neram", "Singari Pyari","Annakiliye","Thaa Nanthana Gummi Kotti", "Paatukku Paattu Edukkava"(Athisaya Piravi)
- "Ponmaana Thedi Naanum Poovodu" (Enga Oor Raachathi)
- "Suham Suhame Eyei Thoda Thoda Thane" (Naan Potta Savaal)
- "Aaagaya Gangai", "Oru Thanga Radathil" (Dharma Yuddam)
- "Then Kizhakku" (Kizhakku Cheemayile)
- "Yaana Varadha" (Antha Rathirikku Satchi Illai) - 1982
- "Vetthalaiya Pottendi" (Billa)
- "Thangangale Thambigale" (Thillu Mullu)
- "Devathai Pol Oru Pen Ingu Vandathu" along with Mano (singer) (Gopura Vasalile)
- "Aathu mettula Oru Paattu Kekkuthu" (Giramaththu Athiyayam)
- "Aazhakkadali Thediya Muthu" (Sattam En Kaiyil)
- "Aanatha Then Katru Thalttuthe" (Manippoor Mamiyar)
- "Kaathal Vaibohame Kaanum Nannalile" (Suvar illatha Sithirangal)
- "Koodalooru Gundumalli, Kootathula kuninji" (Kumbakkarai Thangaiya)
- "Poove Ilaya Poove varamtharum" (Kozhi Koovuthu)
- "Vetti Veru Vaasham" (Mudhal Mariyathai)
- "Mapillaikku Maaman Manasu" (Netrikkann)
- "Kaadhal Vandhuduchu aasaiyil odi vandaen" (Kalyanaraman)
- "Katti Vechuko Intha Anbu Manasa" (En Jeevan Paaduthu)
- "Vaa Vaa Vasanthame Sugam tharum" (Pudhu Kavidhai)
- "Alli Thatha Boomi Annai Allava" (Nandu)
- "Ananda Then Sinthum Pooncholayil" (Mann Vasanai)
- "Aasai Nooru Vagai, Vazhvil Nooru Suvai" (Adutha Vaarisu)
- "Eh Rasathi" (En Uyir Thozhan)
- "Malaiyoram Mayile" (Oruvar Vaazhum Aalayam)
- "Enna Sugaama" "Oru Ooril Oru Maharani" (Garjanai)
- "Pulli Vacha Oru Ponnatha", "Poove Poove Ponnama", "Patukku Jodiya","Yaar Paadum Paadal" (Paattukku Naan Adimai)
- "Ponmaana Thedi" (Enga Ooru Rasathi)
- "Enni Irundhadhu" (Andha 7 Naatkal)
- "Kathal Vaibhogame" (Suvarilla Chithiram)
- "Naan Appodhu" (Pagal Nilavu)
- "Adi Aathadi" (Sad) (Kadalora Kavithaigal)
- "Thanga Changili" (Thooral Ninnu Pochchu)
- "Thaalaatta Naan" (Thooral Ninnu pochu)
- "Mamavukku Kuduma Kuduma" (Punnagai Mannan)
- "Marappu Potta Ponnu" ( Deivapiravi)
- "Panchu Mittai" (Ettupatti Rasa)
- "Yen Thaayin Meedhu Aanai" (Mr. Bharath)
- "Enna Ma Kannu" along with S.P.Balasubramaniam (Mr. Bharath)
- "Maman Ponukku" along with S.P.Balasubramaniam (Chinna Thambi Periya Thambi)
- "Yejaman Kaaladi Maneduthu, Netthiyila Pottu Vechom" (Yejaman)
- "Ooru Vittu Ooru Vandhu" along with Gangai Amaran (Karagattakaran)
- "Mariamma Mariamma" (Karagattakaran)
- "Paattu Inge " (Poovizhi Vasalile)
- "Per Vechaalum" (Micheal Madhana Kamarajan)
- "Kaadu Potta Kaadu" (Karuththamma)
- "Monalisa Monalisa" (Mr. Romeo)
- "Poo Pookkum Oosai" (Minsara Kanavu)
- "Singam Ondru Purappathade" (Arunachalam)
- "Manasilayoo" (Vettaiyan) Generated voice of his by AI Voice Modeling Technology

== Filmography ==
Actor

This is a partial list of some of the films Malaysia Vasudevan has acted in.

Year	Title	Role	Notes
1977	Avar Enakke Sontham		
1978	Nenjil Aadum Poo Ondru		
1979	Velli Ratham		
1980	Samanthipoo		
1981	Pakkuvethilai		
1982	Idho Varukiren Idho Varukiren		
1982	Nizhal Suduvathillai		
1983	Ethanai Konam Ethanai Parvai		
1984	Ayiram Kaigal		
1985	Oru Kaidhiyin Diary	Suryaprakasam	
1985	Kolusu		
1986	Muthal Vasantham		
1986	Unnidathil Naan		
1986	Palaivana Rojakkal		
1986	Oomai Vizhigal	Sattanathan MLA	
1987	Kadamai Kanniyam Kattupaadu		
1987	Per Sollum Pillai		
1987	Ithanai Nalai Engirunthai		
1987	Oorkavalan		
1987	Parisam Pottachu		
1987	Theertha Karayinile		
1987	Uzhavan Magan		
1987	Sirai Paravai		
1987	Jallikattu	Numerology	
1988	Therkathi Kallan		
1988	Oorai Therinjikitten	Yercaud subramanian	
1988	Katha Nayagan		
1988	Raasave Unnai Nambi	Vasu	
1988	Poonthotta Kaavalkaaran		
1988	Thambi Thanga Kambi		
1989	Thendral Sudum		
1989	Pongi Varum Kaveri		
1989	Dharma Devan		
1989	Poruthathu Pothum	Mohan Raj	
1989	Annakili Sonna Kathai		
1990	Parampara	Kaliyappa Chettiyar	Malayalam film
1990	Engal Swamy Ayyappan		
1990	Neesirithal Deepavali		
1992	Singaravelan	Sumathi's father	
1993	Thiruda Thiruda	Inspector	
1993	Paramparyam		
1993	Karuppu Vellai		
1994	Amaidhi Padai		
1994	Jallikattu Kaalai		
1994	Pandiyanin Rajyathil		
1996	Poove Unakkaga	Vasudevan	
1996	Summa Irunga Machan		
1996	Mappillai Manasu Poopola		
1996	Tamizh Selvan	Chief minister Dakshanamoorthy	
1996	Vasuki		
1996	Gopala Gopala		
1997	Pongalo Pongal		
1997	Kathirunda Kadhal		
1998	Ninaithen Vandhai	Vasudevan	
1998	Dhinamdhorum		
1999	Pooparika Varugirom		
2000	Kandukondain Kandukondain		
2000	Doubles		
2001	Badri	Bhumika's Father	
2002	Punnagai Desam		
2003	Kaiyodu Kai		
2003	Nilavil Kalangamillai		
2006	Kokki		
2007	Adavadi		
2007	Ninaithu Ninaithu Parthen		
2007	Piragu		
2009	Vikrant	Chakravarthy	Malaysian film
2013	Thirumathi Thamizh		

Director

- Nee Sirithal Deepavali (1991)

TV Serials

- 2000 Micro Thodargal- Thedathe Tholainthu Povai
- 2006-2007 Lakshmi as Puniyakodi

Composer

- Samanthipoo (1980)
- Sonnathu Nee Thaana (2006)
