= Kamakodiyan =

Tamil poet and lyricist (1945–2022)

- Born: Srinivasan; 1945; Madurai, Tamil Nadu, India
- Died: 6 January 2022
- Occupations: Poet, lyricist
- Years active: 1980–2022

Srinivasan (1945–2022) known professionally as Kamakodiyan (/kɑːməˈkoʊdijən/) was an Indian poet and lyricist who worked mainly in Tamil cinema.

== Life ==
Kamakodiyan, born Srinivasan, was a native of Madurai. He later left for Madras (now Chennai) and stayed with his cousin K. S. Madhangan, then an aspiring film director. At that time, Srinivasan wrote poems for magazines, catching Madhangan's attention. He gave him the pen name Kamakodiyan, derived from the saint Kanchi Kamakoti Peetham. Madhangan eventually made his directorial debut with Ponnagaram (1980), and Kamakodiyan debuted in the same film with the music composed by Shankar–Ganesh. He went on to write lyrics for numerous films with music by M. S. Viswanathan, Ilaiyaraaja and Chandrabose. He wrote a book called Mellisai Mannar MSV um Naanum. He was awarded Kalaimamani in 2019.

== Style ==
Kamakodiyan would write lyrics as the tune was being composed, and would work in tandem with the composer. He lamented changes in the 21st century, where lyricists receive the complete recorded tune via cassette and are asked to write lyrics, but do not work closely with the composer.

== Death ==
Kamakodiyan died on 6 January 2022.

== Filmography ==
=== Lyrics ===
Year	Film	Songs
1980	Ponnagaram	3 songs
1987	Ninaikka Therintha Maname	all songs
1987	Poovizhi Vasalile	"Aattam Inge", "Paattu Enge"
1990	Vaazhkai Chakkaram	"Thookkanam Kuruvi", "Aathangarai Oram"
1990	En Veedu En Kanavar	"My Dear My Dear"
1991	Pongada Neengalum Unga Arasiyalum	all songs
1995	Chandralekha	"Adikkadi Thudikkum", "Anal Thanil"
1996	Vetri Vinayagar	all songs
1997	Dhinamum Ennai Gavani	"Sevvanthi Thottathile"
1999	Annan	"Kanmanikku Vaazhthu"
2000	Koodi Vazhnthal Kodi Nanmai	"Enga Veettu Kalyanam"
2001	En Purushan Kuzhandhai Maadhiri	"Chithiraye", "Vennila"
2002	Padai Veetu Amman	"Paambe Adi"
2002	Mounam Pesiyadhe	"En Anbe"
2015	Thiruttu Rail	

=== Dialogue writer ===
Year	Film	Notes
1991	Pongada Neengalum Unga Arasiyalum	Tamil dubbed version of Telugu film Jaitra Yatra

== Awards and nominations ==
- Kalaimamani Award - 2019
