= Nandi Award for Best Lyricist =

Indian film award

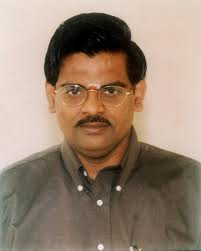
Sirivennela Sitaramasastri, he won the Nandi award 11 times, the most by an individual

The following is a list of the recipients of the Nandi Award for Best Lyricist since 1977 and the films they won for.

== Winners ==
Year	Lyricist	Film	Song
1977	Veturi	Panthulamma	"Manasa Veena Madhu Geetam"
1978	Devulapalli Krishnasastri	Seetamalakshmi	"Maavichiguru Thinagaane"
1979	Veturi	Sankarabharanam	
1980	Bhargavi	Sri Vasavi Kanyaka Parameswari Mahatyam	
1981	Aatreya	Tholi Kodi Koosindi	"Andamaina Lokamani"
1982	Devulapalli Krishnasastri	Meghasandesam	"Aakulo Aakunai"
1983	Sri Sri	Neti Bharatham	"Ardha Raatri Swatantram"
1984	Veturi	Kanchana Ganga	"Brundavani Vundi"
1985	Veturi	Pratighatana	"Ee Duryodhana Dushasana"
1986	Sirivennela Seetharama Sastry	Sirivennela	"Vidatha Talapuna"
1987	Sirivennela Seetharama Sastry	Sruthilayalu	"Thellavarademo Swamy"
1988	Sirivennela Seetharama Sastry	Swarna Kamalam	"Andela Ravamidi"
1989	M. S. Reddy	Ankusam	
1990	Jaladi Raja Rao	Yerra Mandaram	"Yaalo Yaalo"
1991	Veturi	Chanti	"Pavuraniki Panjaraniki"
1992	Veturi	Rajeswari Kalyanam	
1993	Sirivennela Seetharama Sastry	Gaayam	"Surajyamavaleni Swarajyam"
1994	Sirivennela Seetharama Sastry	Subhalagnam	"Chilaka Ye Thodu Leka"
1995	Gaddar	Orey Rikshaw	"Malletheega Ku Pandiri Vole"
1996	Sirivennela Seetharama Sastry	Srikaram	"Manasu Kastha"
1997	Sirivennela Seetharama Sastry	Sindhooram	"Ardha Shatabdapu"
1998	Suddala Ashok Teja	Kante Kuthurne Kanu	"Aadakoothuraa Neeku"
1999	Sirivennela Seetharama Sastry	Prema Katha	"Devudu Karunisthadani"
2000	Vennelakanti	Raghavayyagari Abbayi	"Buddhabhoomi Rudrabhoomi"
2001	C. Narayana Reddy	Preminchu	"Kantene Amma Ani"
2002	Chandrabose	Aadi	"Nee Navvula Telladananni"
2003	C. Narayana Reddy	Seetayya	"Idigo Raayalaseema Gadda"
2004	Chandrabose	Nenunnanu	"Nenunnanani"
2005	Sirivennela Seetharama Sastry	Chakram	"Jagamanta Kutumbam Naadi"
2006	Ande Sri	Ganga	"Vellipothunnava Thalli"
2007	Venigella Rambabu	Mee Sreyobhilashi	"Chirunavvulatho Brathakali"
2008	Sirivennela Seetharama Sastry	Gamyam	"Enthavaraku Endukoraku"
2009	Suddala Ashok Teja	Mesthri	"O Thalli Na Thalli"
2010	N. Siddareddy	Veera Telangana	"Nageti Sallalo"
2011	Mittapalli Surender	Poru Telangana	"Raathi Bommallona"
2012	Ananta Sriram	Yeto Vellipoyindhi Manasu	"Koti Koti Tharallona"
2013	Sirivennela Seetharama Sastry	Seethamma Vakitlo Sirimalle Chettu	"Mari Anthaga"
2014	Chaitanya Prasad	Broker 2	"Yevadevado Pasthunte"
2015	Ramajogayya Sastry	Srimanthudu	"Srimanthuda"
2016	Ramajogayya Sastry	Janatha Garage	"Pranaamam Pranaamam"

=== Most won ===
Winners with most wins
Winner	Wins
Sirivennela Seetharama Sastry	11
Veturi	6
Chandrabose	3
