= Vooru Manadiraa =

- CD cover
- Directed by: R. Narayana Murthy
- Written by: R. Narayana Murthy
- Dialogue by: Sanjeevi
- Produced by: R. Narayana Murthy
- Starring: R. Narayana Murthy; Siddappa Naidu; Telangana Sakunthala
- Cinematography: D Veerraju
- Music by: Koti
- Production company: Sneha Chitra
- Release date: 31 May 2002
- Country: India
- Language: Telugu

Vooru Manadiraa (transl. The village is ours) is a 2002 Indian Telugu-language revolutionary film directed by R. Narayana Murthy starring himself, Siddappa Naidu and Telangana Sakunthala. The film's title is based on a song from Erra Sainyam (1994).

The film was released to positive reviews. It was a success in the Nizam region (modern day Telangana) while it was a box office failure in Andhra Pradesh.

== Cast ==
- R. Narayana Murthy as Bheemudu
- Siddappa Naidu as Durgaprasad Deshmukh
- Narra Venkateswara Rao as Malla Reddy
- P. Ravishankar as Police Officer
- Jayachandra Raju
- Praveen Chakravarthy
- Amrendra Mandulu
- Sandesh
- Vijayakumar
- Vijayalakshmi
- Rajkumar
- Bhaskara Rao
- Sudarshan
- Telangana Sakunthala as Rajamma
- Jhansi as Bheemudu's sister
- Ratnasri

== Soundtrack ==
The music was composed by Koti. The lyrics were written by Suddala Ashok Teja, Guda Anjaiah, Goreti Venkanna, U Sambasiva Rao, Ande Sri, and Nandigama Gani.

Track listing
No.	Title	Lyrics	Singer(s)	Length
1.	"Yuddamochera"	Suddala Ashok Teja	S. P. Balasubrahmanyam	5:15
2.	"Naa Chelli Chandramma"	Praja Kavi	P. Jayachandran	5:28
3.	"Gudamba Kunda"	Kishore	Kishore	4:30
4.	"Andukora"	Goreti Venkanna	Mano	6:46
5.	"Dalitha Pululu"	Suddala Ashok Teja, Warangal Srinivas	Warangal Shankar	4:43
6.	"Jo Laali"	U. Sambasiva Rao	Swarnalatha	6:04
7.	"Chooda Chakkani"	Ande Sri	Ramana	7:36
8.	"Gorre Bayaro Raja"		Warangal Srinivas	4:53
Total length:				45:15

== Reception ==
Jeevi of Idlebrain.com gave the film a rating of three out of five stars and wrote that "Vooru Manadira is the film based on land movement, which is the driving factor behind naxalism in Telangana. This film is reflects the feelings of suppressed people in Telangana. But the projection of it is very raw". Gudipoori Srihari of The Hindu wrote that "Narayanamurthy is subdued in the first half and shows his true spirits later. Sankar sends a chill through the spine with his voice and histrionic talent playing this brutal role. The folk tunes are many and the lyrical strength also proves its worth as the songs project the helplessness of oppressed people". A critic from Full Hyderabad wrote that "The dialogues by Narayana Murthy are quite persuasive as usual. Everyone seems to have done justice to his bit, with the exception of Narayana Murthy who goes overboard, naturally".
