= Vandemataram Srinivas =

Indian music director (born 1962)

- Born: Kanneboina Srinivasa Rao Yadav; 9 September 1964 (age 62); Ramakrishnapuram, Khammam district, Andhra Pradesh, India (now in Telangana, India)
- Genres: Film score, theatre, folk
- Occupations: Composer, record producer, music director, singer, actor, director.
- Instrument: Keyboards
- Years active: 1985–present

Kanneboina Srinivasa Rao Yadav, also known as Vandemataram Srinivas, is an Indian music director and playback singer who works predominantly in Telugu cinema. He has won two Filmfare Awards and six Nandi Awards. He got the prefix "Vandemataram" from the title song of the film Vande Mataram (1985).

== Early life ==
Vandemataram Srinivas was born as Kanneboina Srinivasa Rao. He was born in a Ramakrishnapuram village in Khammam district of Telangana India.

== Awards ==
Filmfare Awards:

- Best Music Director – Telugu - Osey Ramulamma (1997)
- Best Male Playback Singer – Telugu for Aahaa..! (1998)

Nandi Awards

- Best Music Director – Osey Ramulamma(1997)
- Best Music Director – Swayamvaram (1999)
- Best Music Director – Devullu (2000)
- Best Male Playback Singer – Orey Rikshaw (1995)
- Best Male Playback Singer – Sri Ramulayya (1998)
- Best Male Playback Singer –Dandakaranyam (2016)

Other Honors

- Doctorate from Gandhi Institute of Technology and Management (GITAM)

== Discography ==
=== As composer ===
==== Telugu films ====
Year	Film	Notes
1994	Amma Na Kodala	
1994	Erra Sainyam	
1995	Orey Rikshaw	
1996	Maa Aavida Collector	
1996	Maa Inti Adapaduchu	
1997	Priyamaina Srivaaru	
1997	Maa Aayana Bangaram	
1997	Rowdy Durbar	
1997	Osey Ramulamma	
1997	Sri Ramulayya	
1997	Kurralla Rajyam	
1997	Pelli Pandiri	
1998	O Panaipothundi Babu	
1998	Suprabhatam	
1998	Daddy Daddy	
1998	Suryudu	
1998	Aahaa..!	
1999	Swapnalokam	
1999	Yamajathakudu	
1999	Swayamvaram	
1999	Bharata Ratna	
1999	Hello...Yama!	
1999	Maa Balaji	
1999	Sambayya	
2000	Sammakka Sarakka	
2000	Uncle	
2000	Adavi Chukka	
2000	Kante Koothurne Kanu	
2000	Ammo! Okato Tareekhu	
2000	Jayam Manadera	
2000	Tirumala Tirupati Venkatesa	
2000	Kshemamga Velli Labhamga Randi	
2000	Postman	
2000	Manasunna Maaraju	
2000	Devullu	
2001	Pandanti Samsaram	
2001	Khaki Chokka	Only score
2001	Chirujallu	
2001	Vyjayanthi	
2001	Tholi Valapu	
2001	Thank You Subba Rao	Only score
2001	Ammayi Kosam	
2001	Orey Thammudu	
2001	Apparao Ki Oka Nela Thappindi	
2001	Muthyam	
2001	Bhadrachalam	
2002	Jenda	
2002	Girl Friend	
2002	Kubusam	
2003	Bheemudu	
2003	Aayudham	
2003	Ammulu	
2003	Missamma	
2003	Golmaal	
2003	Fools	
2003	Chantigadu	
2004	Koduku	
2004	Sankharavam	
2004	Oka Pellam Muddu Rendo Pellam Vaddu	
2005	Okkade	
2005	Sravanamasam	
2005	Ayodhya	
2005	Good Boy	
2006	Samanyudu	
2007	Pagale Vennela	
2007	Gundamma Gaari Manavadu	
2007	Seema Sastri	
2007	Aadivaram Aadavallaku Selavu	
2008	Erra Samudram	
2008	Gajibiji	
2008	Deepavali	
2009	Anjani Putrudu	
2010	Amma Leni Puttillu	
2010	Badmash	
2010	Dammunnodu	
2011	Telugammayi	
2011	Seema Tapakai	
2012	Ding Dong Bell	
2016	Ammayi Aaruguru	
2017	Head Constable Venkataramayya	
2017	Ido Prema Lokam	
2019	Pranam Khareedu	

==== Kannada films ====
Year	Film	Notes
2003	Mane Magalu	remake of Maa Inti Adapaduchu (1996)
2003	Kaun Banega Kotyadipathi	Unreleased film; reused 1 song from Girl Friend
2004	Rowdy Aliya	1 song only
2006	Hettavara Kanasu	remake of Ammayi Kapuram (1994)
2008	Citizen	

==== Hindi film ====
Year	Film	Notes
2004	Ishq Hai Tumse	Score only

=== As playback singer ===
- Vande Mataram (1985) (Debut)
- Zoo Laka Taka (1989)
- Palnati Pourusham (1994)
- Orey Rikshaw (1995)
- Money Money (1995)
- Prema Lekha (1996) (Telugu dubbed version) - "Digulu Padakuraa Sahodaraa"
- 50-50 (1997) (Telugu dubbed version of Daud)
- Sri Ramulayya (1998)
- Aahaa..! (1998)
- Aawaragaadu (2000)
- Adavi Chukka (2000)
- Kante Koothurne Kanu (2000)
- Gemeni (2002)
- Jai Bolo Telangana (2011)
- Poru Telangana (2012)
- Biriyani (2013) (Telugu dubbed version)
- Udyama Simham (2019)
- Ee Ammayi (2022)

== Filmography ==
=== As actor ===
- Konguchaatu Krishnudu (1993)
- Ammulu (2003) as Kishtaiah

=== As director ===
- Badmash (2010)
