= Bharata Ratna =

1999 Telugu film by Kodi Ramakrishna

- Directed by: Kodi Ramakrishna
- Story by: Posani Krishna Murali
- Dialogues by: Posani Krishna Murali
- Produced by: Boyinapalli Srinivasa Rao
- Starring: Vijayashanti; Vinod Kumar
- Cinematography: Kodi Lakshman
- Music by: Vandemataram Srinivas
- Production company: Pratima Film Productions
- Release date: 4 June 1999
- Country: India
- Language: Telugu

Bharata Ratna is a 1999 Indian Telugu-language action drama film directed by Kodi Ramakrishna. The film stars Vijayashanti in a dual role as Vijaya and Bhavani, alongside Vinod Kumar, Kota Srinivasa Rao, and Raghunatha Reddy. It was produced by Boyinapalli Srinivasa Rao under the Pratima Film Productions banner, with music composed by Vandemataram Srinivas.

Bharata Ratna was released on 4 June 1999, and was later dubbed in Tamil as Bharatha Rathna (with a few reshot scenes with Senthil and Pandu) and Hindi as Captain Bhavani. It received the Sarojini Devi Award for a Film on National Integration at the 1999 Nandi Awards.

== Plot ==
Vijaya (Vijayashanti) and Gopi (Avinash) are petty thieves who steal from the rich to help the poor, reminiscent of Robin Hood. Meanwhile, an underworld don (Kota Srinivasa Rao) and a corrupt Home Minister (Raghunatha Reddy) engage in arms smuggling across the India–Pakistan border and support terrorist activities in Kashmir.

A police officer named Sekhar (Vinod Kumar) arrests Vijaya and Gopi but acts strangely close to Vijaya, eventually revealing that she is already married to him. Sekhar introduces Vijaya to Durga Bhavani (also played by Vijayashanti), a Major in the Indian Army, leading the fight against terrorists in Kashmir. The film then explores the complexities of their relationships and the challenges they face in stopping the arms smugglers and rescuing a United Nations team held captive by insurgents.

== Cast ==
- Vijayashanti as Vijaya / Bhavani
- Vinod Kumar as Sekhar
- Kota Srinivasa Rao as Mafia Don
- Raghunatha Reddy as Home Minister
- Avinash as Gopi
- Kolla Ashok Kumar as a traitor in the army
- AVS
- M. S. Narayana
- Gundu Hanumantha Rao
- Narsing Yadav
- Jr. Relangi
- Posani Krishna Murali as jewellery shop staff member

== Production ==
As of March 1999, Bharata Ratna had completed filming, with its climax shot at the international border near Jaisalmer. The film was promoted as one of the first in Indian cinema to feature a female lead, played by Vijaya Shanti, portraying an army officer who confronts enemy forces at the border.

According to executive producer Ram Mohan Rao, key scenes were filmed in Kulu and Manali under challenging conditions, with temperatures as low as two degrees Celsius. The crew worked through three nights in heavy snowfall to capture scenes essential to the storyline.

An additional feature of the film includes Vijayashanti singing a duet with Udit Narayan. A March 1999 press conference noted that Bharata Ratna was scheduled for release in late March 1999.

== Music ==
Music for the film was composed by Vandemataram Srinivas.

- Hecharika Hecharika
- Mera Bharat ko Salaam
- Parahushaaru Bhai
- Choti Choti Dongatanam
- Laaloo Darwaza

== Reception ==
Sify praised Vijayashanti's dual-role performance and the gripping climax but found the supporting cast passable and the music average. It noted that the narrative was engaging, though the military scenes were less impactful compared to films like Haqeeqat (1964) and Border (1997). Griddaluru Gopala Rao of Zamin Ryot gave the film a positive review, praising the direction, story, and Vijayashanti's performance, as well as the cinematography. Andhra Today wrote "Though the subject chosen is quite good, lack of depth in handling the topic leaves the audience a disappointed lot".

In 2020, Vijayashanti reflected on her role as Bhavani in the film, particularly in light of the Supreme Court's ruling that supported gender equality in the armed forces, expressing that the judgment fulfilled the vision she portrayed as an army officer in the film.

== Awards ==
- Sarojini Devi Award for a Film on National Integration
