= Sri Ramulayya =

- Directed by: N. Shankar
- Produced by: Paritala Sunitha
- Starring: Mohan Babu Manchu; Soundarya; Harikrishna Nandamuri; Srihari; Kota Srinivasa Rao; Nutan Prasad; Ranjitha; Brahmaji
- Cinematography: V. S. R. Swamy
- Edited by: Gautham Raju
- Music by: Vandemataram Srinivas
- Release date: 8 August 1998
- Running time: 3 hours (180 minutes)
- Country: India
- Language: Telugu

Sri Ramulayya is a 1998 Indian Telugu-language biographical film, based on the life of Paritala Sriramulu, father of politician Paritala Ravindra, directed by N. Shankar. The film stars Mohan Babu, Nandamuri Harikrishna and Soundarya. The film was a box office hit and won two Nandi Awards.

== Cast ==
- Mohan Babu
- Soundarya
- Nandamuri Harikrishna
- Srihari
- Kota Srinivasa Rao
- Mannava Balayya
- Ranjitha
- Jeeva
- Nutan Prasad
- Jayaprakash Reddy
- Brahmaji
- Paruchuri Venkateswara Rao
- Sivaparvathi
- Radha Prasanthi
- Shanoor Sana
- Telangana Shakuntala
- Raghunatha Reddy
- P. L. Narayana
- Prathyusha
- Alapati Lakshmi
- Bramhanandam
- AVS
- M S Narayana
- Venu Madhav
- Chalapathi Rao
- Mohan Raj
- Raja Ravindra
- Narra Venkateswara Rao
- Ashok Kumar
- Bandla Ganesh
- Naveen
- Padma Jayanth

== Production ==
The film was launched on 19 November 1997 at Ramanaidu Studios however the event saw thirty people dying due to bomb blast. The film saw Nandamuri Harikrishna making comeback to films after a long sabbatical.

== Soundtrack ==
The music and background score was composed by Vandemataram Srinivas.

Tracklist
No.	Title	Lyrics	Singer(s)	Length
1.	"Bhoomiki Pachani"	Kalekuri Prasad	K. J. Yesudas, Anuradha Sriram
2.	"Rajya Himsa"	Goreti Venkanna	Vandemataram Srinivas
3.	"Nanuganna Naa Thalli"	Goreti Venkanna	S. P. Balasubrahmanyam, K. S. Chithra
4.	"Ghadiya Ghadiya"	Suddhala Ashok Teja	K. J. Yesudas, Chitra
5.	"Karma Bhoomilo"	Kalekuri Prasad	K. J. Yesudas
6.	"Joharu Joharu"	Sangha	Vandemataram Srinivas
7.	"Vippa Poola"	Shiva Sagar	Vandemataram Srinivas
8.	"Poratala Ramulu"	Sangha	Vandemataram Srinivas

== Reception ==
Andhra Today wrote "Like in his earlier venture "Encounter", by opting for a weak theme, the director N. Sanker repeated his mistake in choosing a thin storyline and failed to deliver the goods".

== Awards ==
Nandi Awards

- Best Male Playback Singer - Vandemataram Srinivas
- Special Jury Award - Srihari
