= Sammakka Sarakka =

Indian action drama film

- Directed by: Dasari Narayana Rao
- Written by: Dasari Narayana Rao
- Produced by: Dasari Narayana Rao
- Starring: Roja; Ramya Krishna; Dasari Narayana Rao; Prakash Raj
- Music by: Vandemataram Srinivas
- Release date: 15 January 2000
- Running time: 2 hours 40 minutes (160 minutes)
- Country: India
- Language: Telugu

Sammakka Sarakka is a 2000 Indian Telugu-language action drama film directed by Dasari Narayana Rao starring himself, Roja, Ramya Krishna and Prakash Raj.

== Cast ==
- Roja as Sarakka
- Ramya Krishna as Sammakka
- Dasari Narayana Rao
- Prakash Raj as Bose
- Indraja
- Narra Venkateswara Rao as the landlord
- Prithvi
- Brahmaji
- Telangana Shakuntala
- AVS
- Mukku Raju

== Production ==
The film began production in 1999 but was stalled because of Dasari Narayana Rao's Pichodi Chetilo Raayi (1999). Ramya Krishna had not received remuneration for the film, so she left the film and the duration of her role was shortened. The filming was held at Talakona forests.

== Soundtrack ==
The music was composed by Vandemataram Srinivas and features nine songs. The lyrics were written by Suddala Ashok Teja and Dasari Narayana Rao. The songs were released under the Aditya Music audio label.

1. "Andaala Maa Oori" - Vandemataram Srinivas, Swarnalatha
2. "Si Si Medaram Jatara" - Vandemataram Srinivas
3. "Good Morningandi" - Vandemataram Srinivas, Swarnalatha
4. "Baloccha Acha" - Vandemataram Srinivas, Swarnalatha
5. "Maryaadha" - Vandemataram Srinivas, Murali, Malgudi Subha
6. "Elladellodhe" - Malgudi Subha
7. "Priyamaina Mukyamantri Garu" - Vandemataram Srinivas
8. "Puttindhee Oka Saare" - Vandemataram Srinivas
9. "Veeche Gaalini Narike" - Vandemataram Srinivas

== Release ==
Prior to the release of the film, Annapurna Studios sent a complaint to Dasari Narayana Rao saying that he owed money to them from the failure of Ramanaidu Studios' Prema Mandiram (1981) starring Akkineni Nageswara Rao and had to pay it before Sammakka Sarakka (2000) could release. D. Suresh Babu intervened and sent the needed dues to Annapurna Studios.

== Reception ==
Jeevi of Idlebrain.com wrote that "If you like 'Osey Ramulamma' and if you want to watch the badly executed 'Osey Ramulamma', watch this film!"
