= Yamajathakudu =

- Directed by: N. Shankar
- Screenplay by: N. Shankar
- Story by: Paruchuri Brothers
- Produced by: Mohan Babu
- Dialogue by: Paruchuri Brothers
- Starring: Mohan Babu; Rajendra Prasad; Sakshi Shivanand
- Cinematography: A. Vincent; Ajayan Vincent
- Edited by: Gautham Raju
- Music by: Vandemataram Srinivas
- Production company: Sri Lakshmi Prasanna Pictures
- Release date: 5 March 1999
- Running time: 146 mins
- Country: India
- Language: Telugu

Yamajathakudu is a 1999 Indian Telugu-language fantasy comedy film, produced by Mohan Babu under his Sree Lakshmi Prasanna Pictures banner and directed by N. Shankar. It stars Mohan Babu, Rajendra Prasad, and Sakshi Shivanand with music by Vandemataram Srinivas. Despite releasing to positive reviews, the film was a box office failure.

== Plot ==
The film begins with a materialistic advocate, Sivaji, who falsifies the judiciary, succeeding in the phony cases for money. He is a tomcat, too, and dotes on his niece, Chintu. Once, he takes up a case of rape & murder convict Srinath, son of MP Narsingh. Sivaji wangles and incriminates the driver, Babji, therein. After a while, Sivaji becomes acquainted with & genuinely loves a charming girl named Sirisha when he reforms and quits his past life. During their engagement, Sirisha's housekeeper, Ramulamma, none other than Babji's mother, curses Sivaji. Thus, he pledges to acquit Babji as non-guilty and new trials. Whereat, malicious Narsingh & Srinath slaughter Sivaji, and he sets foot in hell. It is time for the latest Yama crowning ceremony. Consequently, Sivaji's wit arises in agony when he finds his lifespan is 11 days longer. So, Yama retrieves him with an agent, Puthana, to conceal.

Following this, Sivaji is on the verge of triumphing when the heels hit back. In the combat, Chintu loses her eyesight. Then Ramulamma bestows her own by self-sacrifice. Meanwhile, the wedding arrangements of Sivaji & Sirisha are in progress at Tirumala. Hereupon, Shivaji opts to bar it because of his short lifespan. So, he makes a play with his ex-girlfriend Swarna when Putana also aids him in developing loath in Sirisha. Yama notices it and lands on the earth when he inadvertently unveils Sirisha's horoscope, which shows her spouse has longevity. Accordingly, Sivaji rushes towards Tirumala, and Yama chases him. However, he steps into Tirumala, though blackguards block his way by ceasing them. At last, Shivaji ties the knot, Mangalasturam, to Sirisha before Yama's whip, Yama Pasam, locks him. Finally, the movie ends happily, with Venkateswara and Yama blessing the newly wedded couple.

== Cast ==
- Mohan Babu as Sivaji
- Rajendra Prasad as Yama
- Sakshi Shivanand as Sirisha
- Chandni as Swarna
- Sadhika as Puthana
- Srihari as Srinath
- Brahmanandam as Pittapuram
- Sudhakar as Pichaiah
- Tanikella Bharani as M. P. Narasimham
- Chalapathi Rao as Pedda Yama
- M. S. Narayana as Chitragupta
- A.V.S. as Vichitra Gupta
- Paruchuri Venkateswara Rao as DSP Chandrakanth
- Paruchuri Gopala Krishna
- Raghunatha Reddy as Judge
- Naveen as Babji
- Venu Madhav
- Gundu Hanumantha Rao
- Ironleg Sastri
- Duvvasi Mohan
- Raksha as Nirajaveni
- Siva Parvathi as Manimala Devi
- Alapati Lakshmi as Ramulamma
- Dubbing Janaki as Sirisha's mother
- Baby Niharika as Chintu
- Monica Bedi as an item number in "Ding Dong Dili"
- N. T. Rama Rao as Venkateswara (archival footage)

== Production ==
This film marks the second collaboration between Mohan Babu and Sakshi Sivanand after Collector Garu (1997). A set of Yamalokam costing 40 lakh rupees was built at Annapurna Studios for the film around fifteen days by more than 150 artists. Rajendra Prasad plays a junior version of Yama and Chalapathi Rao plays his father. Three days into the film's shoot, Sakshi Shivanand complained that Mohan Babu had tried to visit her hotel room and try to rape her. Mohan Babu got angry and put his hand on her. After she threatened to complain to the police, Nagarjuna intervened and the shoot was completed. An action scene was canned at Mahabaleshwar with Mohan Babu doing the stunts himself although N. Shankar advised him to use a dupe.

== Soundtrack ==
Yamajathakudu

Soundtrack album by Vandemataram Srinivas
- Released: 1999
- Recorded: 1999
- Genre: Feature film soundtrack
- Length: 29:16
- Language: Telugu
- Label: Supreme Music
- Producer: Vandemataram Srinivas

Vandemataram Srinivas chronology
'Swayamvaram' (1999)	Yamajathakudu (1999)	'Swapnalokam' (1999)

The music was composed by Vandemataram Srinivas and was released on Supreme Audio Company.

Track listing
No.	Title	Lyrics	Singer(s)	Length
1.	"Ding Dong Delhi Paparo"	Bhuvana Chandra	Sukhwinder Singh, Sapna Awasthi	4:47
2.	"Evaro Aa Sundari"	Chandrabose	Hariharan, Sujatha	4:37
3.	"Nee Chevulaki"	Bhuvana Chandra	Mano, Swarnalatha	4:53
4.	"Hey Sanga"	Suddala Ashok Teja	Udit Narayan, Swarnalatha	4:48
5.	"Vandhanalu Vandhanalu"	Suddala Ashok Teja	Sukhwinder Singh	4:39
6.	"Navvalamma Navvali"	Suddala Ashok Teja	K. J. Yesudas	5:32
Total length:				29:16

== Reception ==
A critic from Zamin Ryot wrote that "The film is entertaining" and added that "The director has worked hard to make all the characters entertaining". A critic from Andhra Today wrote that "Lack of proper theme, impedes the director, leaving the film as a mediocre one".

== Box office ==
The film was a box office failure, and Mohan Babu sold his house in Banjara Hills to compensate for the losses.
