= Samanyudu =

- DVD cover
- Directed by: Ravikumar Chavali
- Written by: Ravikumar Chavali
- Produced by: R. R. Venkat
- Starring: Jagapati Babu; Kamna Jethmalani
- Cinematography: Vijay C. Kumar
- Edited by: K. V. Krishna Reddy
- Music by: Vandemataram Srinivas
- Production company: R. R. Movie Makers
- Release date: 19 October 2006
- Running time: 148 minutes
- Country: India
- Language: Telugu

Samanyudu (transl. Common Man) is a 2006 Indian Telugu-language political action film produced by R. R. Venkat on R.R. Movie Makers banner and directed by Ravi C Kumar. The film stars Jagapati Babu and Kamna Jethmalani, while Sai Kumar, Ranganath, Archana, Dasari Arun Kumar, and Vinod Kumar Alva play supporting roles. The music was composed by Vandemataram Srinivas.

The film was released on 19 October 2006. It won Nandi Awards for Best Story Writer and Best Villain and a Filmfare Award for Best Supporting Actor (Telugu).

== Cast ==
- Jagapati Babu as Chandra
- Kamna Jethmalani as Vandana
- Sai Kumar as Bhagawan Raj
- Ranganath as Chandrasekhar
- Archana as Aparna
- Dasari Arun Kumar as Abhi
- Vinod Kumar Alva as Kotilingam Lingam Goud
- M. Balayya as CM Veda Prakash
- Banerjee as ACP Kondal Rao
- Ahuti Prasad as Commissioner Kalyan
- Rajiv Kanakala as Das
- Ashok Kumar as Bank Chairman Raja Reddy
- Rami Reddy as MLA Ramu Yadav
- Narra Venkateswara Rao as MLA Naidu
- M. S. Narayana as Narayana, Chandra's uncle
- Duvvasi Mohan as Narasimha, Bhagawan's P.A.
- Sujitha as Lakshmi
- Satya Krishnan as Vidya
- Raghunatha Reddy as Ramunujam
- Jenny as Dr. Devadinam
- Gundu Sudharshan as Ramaiya
- Fish Venkat as Venkat
- C. V. L. Narasimha Rao as Aparna's father
- Allari Subhashini as Narayana's wife
- Sathanna as MLA Ratnakar
- Chintu as Patnaik
- Baby Harshita as Bindu
- Master Karthik as Young Chandra
- Master Nikhil as Young Abhi
- Baby Greeshma as Young Aparna
- Mumaith Khan as an item number

== Soundtrack ==
Samanyudu

Film score by Vandemataram Srinivas
- Released: 2006
- Genre: Soundtrack
- Length: 23:20
- Label: Aditya Music
- Producer: Vandemataram Srinivas

Vandemataram Srinivas chronology
Sammakka Saarakka Jattara (2005)	Samanyudu (2006)	Seema Sastri (2007)

The music was composed by Vandemataram Srinivas as released on Aditya Music Company.

No.	Title	Lyrics	Singer(s)	Length
1.	"Tara Rara"	Kaluva Krishna Sai	Naveen, Suchitra	4:10
2.	"Maghuva Premalo"	Kaluva Krishna Sai	Naveen, Chitra, Sriramprabhu	3:41
3.	"Yemere Dilke"	Kaluva Krishna Sai	Sonu Kakkar	4:52
4.	"Endira Bavamaridi"	Raju	Vandemataram Srinivas	3:53
5.	"Veedu Yama"	Kaluva Krishna Sai	Sunidhi Chauhan	4:50
6.	"Samanyudu Theme"	Kaluva Krishna Sai	Nihal	1:54
Total length:				23:20

== 100-days function ==
The film completed a 100-day run at the box office on January 26, 2007. The makers of the film held a function at Raavi Narayana Reddy Auditorium in Hyderabad on January 31, 2007. V. B. Rajendra Prasad, T. Subbarami Reddy, APSP DIG Gopinath Reddy, D. Ramanaidu, Srikanth, and Uday Kiran attended this event.

== Awards ==
Award	Category	Recipients and nominees	Outcome
Nandi Awards	Nandi Award for Best Story Writer	Ravi C. Kumar	Won
Nandi Awards	Nandi Award for Best Villain	Sai Kumar	Won
Filmfare Awards	Filmfare Best Supporting Actor Award (Telugu)	Sai Kumar	Won
