= Pelli Pandiri =

- Directed by: Kodi Ramakrishna
- Written by: Thotapalli Madhu (dialogues)
- Screenplay by: Kodi Ramakrishna
- Story by: Umakanth
- Based on: Anuraga Sangama (1995)
- Produced by: G. Aswartha Narayana Babu; M. C. Shekar; S. Ramesh Babu
- Starring: Jagapati Babu; Raasi; Prithiveeraj
- Cinematography: M. Mohan Chand
- Edited by: Suresh Tata
- Music by: Vandemataram Srinivas
- Production company: SRS Art Movies
- Release date: 26 December 1997
- Running time: 150 minutes
- Country: India
- Language: Telugu

Pelli Pandiri (transl. Wedding pandal) is a 1997 Telugu-language drama film directed by Kodi Ramakrishna. It stars Jagapati Babu, Raasi, Pruthvi with music composed by Vandemataram Srinivas. It was produced by G. Aswartha Narayana Babu, M. C. Shekar and S. Ramesh Babu under the SRS Art Movies banner. Pelli Pandiri is a remake of the Kannada film Anuraga Sangama (1995), which was inspired by the Charlie Chaplin-starrer City Lights (1931).

== Cast ==
- Jagapati Babu as Govind
- Raasi as Kasthuri
- Pruthvi as Prakash
- Sarath Babu as Inspector Rama Rao
- Suhasini as Dr. Prabhavathi
- Costume Krishna
- Sudhakar as Goldman
- Mallikarjuna Rao as Bhadram
- Raghunatha Reddy as Notla Raghunath Chowdary
- Pokula Narasimha Rao as Watchman
- Garimalla Viswaswara Rao
- Kallu Chidambaram as Photographer
- Mithai Chitti
- Radha Prashanthi
- Tejaswini
- Master Anand Vardhan as Young Prakash
- Master Srinivas as Young Govind

== Production ==
After the failure of Arundhati (1999), Costume Krishna contacted Dil Raju about this film and decided to give him the distribution rights.

== Soundtrack ==
Pelli Pandiri

Film score by Vandemataram Srinivas
- Released: 1997
- Genre: Soundtrack
- Length: 27:04
- Label: Supreme Music
- Producer: Vandemataram Srinivas

Vandemataram Srinivas chronology
Priyamaina Srivaaru (1997)	Pelli Pandiri (1997)	Suprabhatam (1998)

Music composed by Vandemataram Srinivas. Music is released on Supreme Music Company.

No.	Title	Lyrics	Singer(s)	Length
1.	"Nestama Iddari Lokam"	Sirivennela Sitarama Sastry	S. P. Balasubrahmanyam, Gopika Poornima	5:15
2.	"Choodachakkani Jinkapillara"	Bhuvanachandra	S. P. Balasubrahmanyam, Swarnalatha	4:59
3.	"Anaganaga Oka Nindu Chandamama"	Sirivennela Sitarama Sastry	S. P. Balasubrahmanyam, Chitra	6:09
4.	"Dost Mera Dost"	Sirivennela Sitarama Sastry	S. P. Balasubrahmanyam, Mano	5:45
5.	"Ide Manchi Rojandi Muchataga"	Sirivennela Sitarama Sastry	S. P. Balasubrahmanyam, Swarnalatha	4:47
Total length:				27:04
