= Maa Aavida Collector =

- Title card
- Directed by: Kodi Ramakrishna
- Written by: Pusala (dialogues)
- Screenplay by: Kodi Ramakrishna
- Story by: Amma Art Unit
- Produced by: Kolli Venkateswara Rao; S. Adi Reddy; Costumes Krishna (Presents)
- Starring: Jagapati Babu; Prema
- Cinematography: M. Mohanchand
- Edited by: Nandamuri Hari
- Music by: Vandemataram Srinivas
- Production company: Amma Art Creations
- Release date: 12 April 1996
- Running time: 143 minutes
- Country: India
- Language: Telugu

Maa Aavida Collector (transl. 'My wife is a collector') is a 1996 Indian Telugu-language drama film directed by Kodi Ramakrishna. It stars Jagapati Babu, Prema and music composed by Vandemataram Srinivas. The film was produced by Kolli Venkateswara Rao and S. Adi Reddy under the Amma Art Creations banner. The film is dubbed into Tamil as En Pondatti Collector.

== Plot ==
The film follows Raju, a respected and courageous young man admired by his community, and his conflict with the wealthy and arrogant Parvati Pandit, who, along with her brother Thammugi, exploits the poor. Parvati Pandit’s daughter, Indira, is a kind-hearted and virtuous woman aspiring to become an IAS officer. When Parvati Pandit attempts to seize Raju's colony, he resists her, leading to a confrontation. Meanwhile, Indira becomes enamoured with Raju’s ideals, and he reciprocates her feelings without knowing her true identity. Upon learning her background, Raju distances himself, and Parvati Pandit disowns her daughter. However, Raju steps in, marries Indira, and vows to help her achieve her goal of becoming a Collector.

With Raju’s support and determination, Indira attains her dream, and the couple begins a happy life together, with Indira soon expecting a child. However, Parvati Pandit, unable to accept their happiness, devises schemes to drive a wedge between them. She manipulates Indira’s emotions, falsely implicates the colony residents, and orchestrates the termination of Indira's pregnancy under the pretext of protecting her. She further escalates the conflict by luring Indira and Raju to her mansion and fabricating scenarios to widen the rift. Parvati Pandit finally accuses Raju of infidelity by introducing Vani, a woman who claims to have an illicit relationship with him, leading to Indira divorcing him.

Raju silently endures Vani’s mistreatment until it is revealed that she is the fiancée of his friend Prakash, a man Raju had previously punished to save him from a destructive path. Meanwhile, Thammugi betrays Parvati Pandit and attempts to force Indira into marrying his son, Bujji. During these events, Raju is critically injured by Prakash, who misunderstands his intentions. While Raju fights for his life in the hospital, Indira uncovers her mother’s schemes and confronts her. Overwhelmed with guilt, Parvati Pandit reforms after witnessing Indira’s despair.

In the end, Raju recovers, reconciles with Indira, and defeats the antagonists. The film concludes with the couple reuniting and finding happiness together.

== Cast ==
- Jagapati Babu as Raju
- Prema as Indira
- Subhashri as Vani
- Lakshmi as Parvati Pandit
- Costumes Krishna as Thammugi
- Sudhakar as Bujji
- Ananth Babu
- Visweswara Rao
- Mukku Narasimha Rao
- Poosala Narasimha Rao
- Silk Smitha as item number
- Y. Vijaya

== Production ==
The song "Janda Uncha Rahe Hamaara" ("Swathanthram Raledhani") was shot in Chennai with hundreds of junior artists and featured the Indian flag.

== Soundtrack ==
Maa Aavida Collector

Film score by Vandemataram Srinivas
- Released: 1996
- Genre: Soundtrack
- Length: 28:47
- Label: Shiva Musicals
- Producer: Vandemataram Srinivas

Vandemataram Srinivas chronology
Orey Rickshaw (1995)	Maa Aavida Collector (1996)	Osey Ramulamma (1996)

The music for the film was composed by Vandemataram Srinivas and released by Shiva Musicals Audio Company.

No.	Title	Lyrics	Singer(s)	Length
1.	"Swatantram Raaledani"	Gundavarapu Subbarao	S. P. Balasubrahmanyam	5:15
2.	"Ramanamamento"	Sirivennela Sitarama Sastry	S. P. Balasubrahmanyam, Chitra	4:58
3.	"Naa Kodi Kootakochchindi"	Bhuvanachandra	S. P. Balasubrahmanyam, Swarnalatha	4:26
4.	"Tappukondi Babulu"	Vennelakanti	S. P. Balasubrahmanyam, Chitra	4:51
5.	"Vammo Emi Pillade"	Siva Ganesh	S. P. Balasubrahmanyam, Chitra	4:28
6.	"Jillayile Jillayile"	Siva Ganesh	S. P. Balasubrahmanyam, Chitra	4:49
Total length:				28:47
