= Uncle (2000 film) =

2000 Indian Telugu-language drama film

- Directed by: Rajashekar
- Written by: Thotapalli Madhu (dialogue)
- Screenplay by: AVS; Rajashekar
- Story by: AVS
- Produced by: AVS
- Starring: Tarun; Pallavi; AVS
- Cinematography: M. V. Raghu
- Edited by: Marthand K. Venkatesh
- Music by: Vandemataram Srinivas
- Production company: Shree Ganesh Films
- Release date: 8 December 2000
- Country: India
- Language: Telugu

Uncle is a 2000 Indian Telugu-language drama film directed by Rajasekhar and starring Tarun, Pallavi (in her debut) and AVS, who debuted as a producer with this film. The film released two months after Nuvve Kavali (2000) and was a box office failure.

== Cast ==
- Tarun as Raja
- Pallavi as Keertana
- AVS as Jagadish Chandraprasad and later Veeraswamy (Uncle)
- Brahmanandam as Desikachari
- Narra Venkateswara Rao as Keertana's uncle
- Achyuth as Ram Mohan
- Thotapalli Madhu as Swami
- Raghunatha Reddy as Director General of Police
- Jhansi as Gayatri
- Rajitha as Keertana's sister-in-law
- Chitti Babu as Compounder
- Ananth as Bus conductor
- Sudha
- Uttej as Pan shop owner
- Babloo as College student
- Maharshi Raghava as Keertana's cousin brother
- Jenny as Bus driver

== Production ==
The film was produced by AVS. As of October 2000, the film was still under production. The film was shot at the Public Gardens in Hyderabad and takes place in a college campus.

== Soundtrack ==
Uncle

Soundtrack album by Vandemataram Srinivas
- Released: 2000

The music was composed by Vandemataram Srinivas. The audio launch was attended by seven music composers Mani Sharma, Raju, Shashi Preetam, R. P. Patnaik, Veenapani, Chakri and S. P. Balasubrahmanyam.

Track listing
No.	Title	Lyrics	Singer(s)	Length
1.	"Kurraallam Kurraallam"	AVS	Sonu Nigam	4:46
2.	"Uncle Uncle Little Star"	Suddala Ashok Teja	Unnikrishnan	5:08
3.	"Enno Enno Yeluga"	Sirivennela Seetharama Sastry	S. P. Balasubrahmanyam	4:45
4.	"Enjoy Chesey"	Bhuvana Chandra	Devi Sri Prasad	4:40
5.	"Gitarai Na Padanaa"	Vandemataram Srinivas	Suddala Ashok Teja	5:32
6.	"Kallamundu Cheekatunte"	Sirivennela Seetharama Sastry	S. P. Balasubrahmanyam	6:56
Total length:				31:47

== Reception ==
A critic from Zamin Ryot praised the work of the cast and the crew and wrote that "the result of Rajaskhar's first attempt as a director is appreciable". A critic from Sify wrote that "In his two decade long experience AVS should have observed that Telugu film audience have seldom patronized tragedies, but anyhow he should be lauded for making a risky attempt. We need more of such good filmmakers to break a new path in routine commercial firmament". Andhra Today wrote "The all-pervasive AVS steals the show entirely from Tarun, disappointing the audience's great expectations of him in his second movie. As a story writer he fails in providing an engaging story and churns out a drag. As a producer too, much cost cutting has been done". Telugu Cinema wrote "On the whole the story has so many loose ends. Both the story and screenplay are too amateurish. The only saving grace in the film is Tarun with his refreshing look and action". Indiainfo wrote "AVS's attempt to become a producer comes a cropper though he may make some money cashing in on the popularity of Tarun in the wake of success of Nuvve Kavali. The movie suffers from all the drawbacks associated with poor script and lack of homework. This happened in spite of the fact AVS himself authored the script".

== Box office ==
The film was a box office failure and AVS lost ₹5,000,000 (US$52,000). AVS attributed to the film's failure to Tarun's lack of image and felt that this film could not support the image that was created by the release of Nuvve Kavali. The film was reportedly negatively received by Tarun's parents while Chiranjeevi clapped for the film.

== Awards ==
- Nandi Special Jury Award - AVS
