= Suprabhatam (1998 film) =

- Directed by: Bhimaneni Srinivasa Rao
- Written by: Chintapalli Ramana (dialogues)
- Screenplay by: Bhimaneni Srinivasa Rao
- Story by: N. V. S. Unit
- Based on: Gopala Gopala (1996) by Pandiarajan
- Produced by: Captain N. A. Chowdary
- Starring: Srikanth; Raasi
- Cinematography: Y. Mahendra
- Edited by: Gowtham Raju
- Music by: Vandemataram Srinivas
- Production company: N. V. S. Creations
- Release date: 18 September 1998
- Running time: 143 mins
- Country: India
- Language: Telugu

Suprabhatam (transl. Good Morning) is a 1998 Indian Telugu-language comedy-drama film directed by Bhimaneni Srinivasa Rao. It stars Srikanth, Raasi and music composed by Vandemataram Srinivas. The film was a remake of the Tamil film Gopala Gopala (1996).

== Cast ==
- Srikanth as Gopala Krishna
- Raasi as Vasundhara
- Chandra Mohan as Kutumba Rao
- M. Balayya as Vasundhara's father
- Sudhakar as Tatabbai
- Mallikarjuna Rao as Kodandam
- Giri Babu as Deekshithulu
- A.V.S. as Gopala Krishna's boss
- Costumes Krishna as Minister
- Ali
- Tanikella Bharani
- M. S. Narayana
- Venu Madhav
- Subbaraya Sharma
- Ananth
- Kallu Chidambaram
- Bandla Ganesh
- Tirupathi Prakash
- Raja Ravindra
- Kovai Sarala as Chukkamma
- Priya as Vasundhara's friend
- Alphonsa as Chilakamma
- Ramya Sri as Meenakshi
- Rajitha as Santana Lakshmi
- Varsha
- Bhavana
- Siva Parvati
- Radhabai
- Kalpana Rai

== Production ==
The film is about the misunderstanding between a husband and wife. The message that even orphans can be considered relatives is showcased in the film.

== Soundtrack ==
Suprabhatam

Film score by Vandemataram Srinivas
- Released: 1998
- Genre: Soundtrack
- Length: 28:20
- Label: Aditya Music
- Producer: Vandemataram Srinivas

Vandemataram Srinivas chronology
Suryudu (1998)	Suprabhatam (1998)	Daddy Daddy (1998)

Music composed by Vandemataram Srinivas. The music was released under the Aditya Music label.

Track listing
No.	Title	Lyrics	Singer(s)	Length
1.	"Prema Modhalaithe"	Sirivennela Sitarama Sastry	SP Balu, Chitra	5:06
2.	"Kanna Neekanulaku"	Chandrabose	Chitra, Harini	4:50
3.	"Chandamamarave"	Sirivennela Sitarama Sastry	Ashok Khosla	4:21
4.	"O Priya Vasundhara"	Shanmukha Sarma	SP Balu, Chitra	4:52
5.	"Thaade Pamayye"	Sirivennela Sitarama Sastry	Ashok Khosla	4:12
6.	"Singaraya Konda"	Chandrabose	SP Balu, Swarnalatha	4:59
Total length:				2 8:20

== Reception and box office ==
A critic from Zamin Ryot wrote that "Good entertainment. Srinivasa Rao directed Bheemaneni's film Suprabhatam with the intention of entertaining the audience". A critic from Andhra Today wrote that "Storyline being very thin, the director's attempt to make it completely entertainment oriented, fails to captivate the attention of the audience". The film was a box office failure.
