= Mukku Raju =

Indian actor

- Born: Sagiraju Rajamraju; 1931; Kumudavalli, Madras Presidency, British India (now in Andhra Pradesh, India)
- Died: 31 July 2014 (aged 83); Bhimavaram, West Godavari, Andhra Pradesh, India
- Other name: Rajubabu
- Occupations: Choreographer, Actor
- Years active: 1984-2014
- Spouse: Saraswathi
- Children: 3
- Awards: Nandi Award

Mukku Raju (born Sagiraju Rajamraju) was an Indian film choreographer and actor known for his work in Telugu films like Erra Sainyam, Orey Rikshaw and Cheemala Dandu. He played important roles in movies directed by R. Narayana Murthy.

== Career ==
Raju started his career as a choreographer in Tamil cinema, but ended as an actor and acted in over 1000 films. He choreographed for legendary actors NTR and Sivaji Ganesan. He also directed and wrote scripts for a few films. He started a dancers associations in Madras, later moved to Hyderabad and co-founded the Telugu Dancers and Directors Association, to support and help the budding directors and dancers. He received the Nandi Award for Best Character Actor in 2008 for his film 1940 Lo Oka Gramam (A Village in 1940).

Raju was also an Ayurveda practitioner and a Multilinguist and was best known by the name Sagi Rajan Raju in his hometown, Kumudavalli.

Raju died aged 83 after a short illness, and his funeral took place at Cherukuvada.

== Filmography ==
Year	Title	Role	Notes
1957	Mayabazar		
1968	Tikka Sankarayya		
1984	Mayuri		
1984	Ananda Bhairavi		
1984	Mahanagaramlo Mayagadu		
1985	America Alludu		
1987	Dabbevariki Chedu		
1988	Annapurnamma Gari Alludu		
1989	Bharata Nari		
1989	Paila Pachesu		
1990	Yuvabharatham		
1992	Aapadbandhavudu		
1994	Erra Sainyam		
1995	Orey Rikshaw		
1995	Cheemala Dandu		
1997	Rowdy Darbar		
1997	Osey Ramulamma		
1998	Telugodu		
1999	Raja		
2000	Adavi Chukka		
2001	Maa Aavida Meeda Ottu Mee Aavida Chala Manchidi		
2001	Veedekkadi Mogudandi!		
2003	Indiramma		
2008	Maga Simham		
2008	Devarakonda Veerayya	—N/a	As choreographer
2010	1940 Lo Oka Gramam	Dixitulu	

== Awards ==
He received the Nandi Award for Best Character Actor in 2008 for the film 1940 Lo Oka Gramam.

== Death ==
Raju died on 31 July 2014 due to ill health in Bhimavaram, West Godavari district.
