= Rowdy Durbar =

1997 Telugu film

- Film poster
- Directed by: Dasari Narayana Rao
- Produced by: Dasari Narayana Rao
- Starring: Vijayashanti; Dasari Narayana Rao
- Cinematography: Shyam K. Naidu
- Music by: Vandemataram Srinivas
- Production company: Dasari Film University
- Release date: 7 November 1997
- Country: India
- Language: Telugu

Rowdy Durbar is a 1997 Indian Telugu-language action drama film written and directed by Dasari Narayana Rao. The film stars Vijayashanti in dual roles. The film was a box hit.

== Cast ==
- Vijayashanti as Yellamma and Durgi
- Dasari Narayana Rao as Surayya
- P. Sai Kumar
- Raghunatha Reddy as Narasimhayya
- Jayanthi
- Suthi Velu as Sivayya
- Rami Reddy
- Narra Venkateswara Rao as Ramakrishnayya
- P. J. Sarma as Siddhayya
- Ramki

== Soundtrack ==
All music is composed by Vandemataram Srinivas.

Tracklist
No.	Title	Singer(s)	Length
1.	"Telugu Desam Party"	Vandemataram Srinivas, K. S. Chithra	5:07
2.	"Andala O Poolaremma"	Vandemataram Srinivas, K. S. Chithra	4:46
3.	"Muthalalo Cherakandaya"	Vandemataram Srinivas	5:12
4.	"Janani Janma Bhoomi"	Vandemataram Srinivas, Swarnalatha	5:14
5.	"Poshmmave O Maisammavo"	Vandemataram Srinivas	4:50
6.	"Royalaseema Pranthamlo"	Vandemataram Srinivas	6:07
7.	"Mallepoovva Mallepoovva"	Vandemataram Srinivas, K. S. Chithra	4:46
8.	"Andala O Poolaremma (sad)"	K. S. Chithra	2:13
9.	"Royalaseema Pranthamlo (bit)"	Vandemataram Srinivas	1:01
10.	"Nene Mathangini"	Sujatha	5:50
11.	"Kittamma Gopala Bala"	Gangadhar, Mohan, Lenina Chowdary	5:07
Total length:			50:33

== Reception ==
Giddalur Gopalarao of Zamin Ryot called the film "rowdy". A critic from Andhra Today wrote that " Dasari failed in his attempts to treat the viewers to a better picture than Ose Ramulamma".
