= Telangana Shakuntala =

Indian actress (1951–2014)

- Telangana Shakuntala
- Born: 9 June 1951; Maharashtra, India
- Died: 14 June 2014 (aged 63); Kompalli, Hyderabad, Telangana, India
- Occupation: Actress
- Years active: 1979–2014
- Children: 2
- Awards: Nandi Award for Best Actress (1980)

Telangana Shakuntala (9 June 1951 – 14 June 2014) was an Indian actress who worked in the Telugu cinema. She was known chiefly for playing comedy and villainous characters in Tollywood. Her performances in movies like Osey Ramulamma, Nuvvu Nenu, Lakshmi, Okkadu and Veede were well received. She also acted in television serials and in Tamil-language films, where she is known for her role as Sornakka in Dhool. She was well known for her ability to speak in the Telangana and Rayalaseema dialects of the Telugu language, something which the majority of her roles in Telugu cinema exhibited.

== Early life and career ==
Shakuntala was born in a Maharastrian family in Maharashtra, India. Her father was an Army officer and her mother a housewife. She had four sisters.

She made her stage début in a play at Ravindra Bharathi. She did many plays after that. She started her film career by playing a character role in 1979 Telugu film, Maa Bhoomi directed by Goutam Ghose.

She mainly acted in Telugu movies. Throughout her career she was acclaimed Marathi stage artist.

== Death ==
Shakuntala suffered cardiac arrest at her Hyderabad home on the morning of 14 June 2014, five days after her 63rd birthday. She was admitted to Narayana Hrudayalaya at around 2:30 AM IST, where she was declared dead upon arrival.

== Awards ==
- Best Actress, Nandi Award – 1980 for Kukka

== Filmography ==
=== Telugu ===
Year	Film	Role	Notes
1979	Maa Bhoomi		
1980	Kukka		
1983	Triveni Sangamam		
1983	Moodu Mullu		
1984	Aparadhi		
1986	Aruna Kiranam		
1987	Aha Naa Pellanta	Hostel warden	
1988	Tiragabadda Telugubidda	Brothel owner	Uncredited role
1989	Gandipeta Rahasyam		
1990	20va Sathabdam		
1990	Intinta Deepavali		
1991	Seetharamayya Gari Manavaralu		
1991	Coolie No. 1	Doctor	Uncredited Role
1994	Erra Sainyam		
1995	Telugu Veera Levara		
1995	Pokiri Raja	Ramulamma	
1996	Dharma Chakram		
1997	Osey Ramulamma	Ramaswamy's wife	
1997	Osi Naa Maradala		
1997	Collector Garu		
1997	Aahwanam		
1998	Yuvarathna Rana		
1998	Sri Ramulayya		
1998	Pelli Peetalu		
1998	Ganesh		
2000	Sammakka Sarakka		
2001	Pandanti Samsaram		
2001	Nuvvu Nenu		
2001	Athanu		
2001	Bhadrachalam		
2002	Kondaveeti Simhasanam	Ramachandraiah's mother	
2002	Chandravamsam	Ammagaru	
2002	Neetho Cheppalani		
2002	Tappu Chesi Pappu Koodu		
2002	Vooru Manadiraa		
2002	Sontham		
2002	Indra		
2002	Nee Sneham		
2002	Sandade Sandadi	Kamesh's mother-in-law	
2003	Amma Meeda Ottu		
2003	Abhimanyu		
2003	Veede	Mangatayaru	
2003	Indiramma		
2003	Vishnu		
2003	Sambu		
2003	Gangotri	Durgamma	
2003	Charminar		
2003	Pellamto Panenti		
2003	Simhachalam	Nizam Shantakumari	
2003	Okkadu	Shakuntala	
2003	Toli Choopulone		
2004	Adavi Ramudu		
2004	Donga Dongadi		
2004	Preminchukunnam Pelliki Randi		
2004	Pallakilo Pellikoothuru		
2005	Evadi Gola Vaadidhi		
2005	Orey Pandu		
2005	Sadaa Mee Sevalo		
2005	Okkade		
2005	Vennela		
2006	Lakshmi	Shakuntala	
2006	Rajababu		
2006	Sri Krishna 2006		
2006	Oka V Chitram		
2006	Valliddari Vayasu Padahare		
2006	Sainikudu	ACP Pochamma	
2006	Annavaram	Narasimha's mother	
2006	Neeku Naaku		
2007	Aadivaram Adavallaku Selavu		
2007	Desamuduru	Andal	
2007	Lakshmi Kalyanam		
2007	Julayi		
2007	Viyyalavari Kayyalu	Shakuntala	
2007	Dubai Seenu	Grandma	
2007	Nava Vasantham		
2008	Mallepuvvu		
2008	Jabilamma		
2008	Ankusham		
2008	Kuberulu		
2008	Siddu from Sikakulam	Bhooma Reddy's sister	
2008	Gorintaku		
2009	Pistha		
2009	Bendu Apparao R.M.P		
2009	Current		
2009	Kavi		
2009	Nirnayam		
2009	A Aa E Ee		
2009	Evaraina Epudaina		
2009	Maska	Shinde's sister	
2010	Maa Nanna Chiranjeevi	Didi	
2010	Namo Venkatesa	Shakuntala	
2010	Bramhalokam To Yamalokam Via Bhulokam	Sobhan Babu's mother-in-law	
2010	Okka Kshanam		
2010	Andhra Kiran Bedi		
2010	Komaram Bheem		
2010	Chapter 6		
2010	Sivangi		
2010	Bindaas		
2010	Ranga The Donga		
2010	Glamour		
2010	Kalyanram Kathi		
2010	Buridi		
2010	Panchakshari	Honey's paternal aunt	
2010	Happy Happy Ga	Inspector Sumathi	
2011	Pilla Dorikithe Pelli		
2011	Rajanna		
2012	Ee Vesavilo O Prema Katha		
2012	Guruvaram		
2012	Aada Paandavulu		
2012	All the Best	Waheeda Rahman	
2012	Peoples War		
2013	Naa Anevaadu		
2013	Amma Yellamma		
2013	Rayalaseema Express		
2013	Jabardasth		
2013	Sound Party		
2013	Nirbaya Bharatham		
2013	Emaindi Eevela		
2013	Chandee		
2014	Pandavulu Pandavulu Tummeda		
2014	Malligadu Marriage Bureau	Akka	
2014	Bhimavaram Bullodu	Rambabu's grandmother	
2014	Rajyadikaram		
2015	Courier Boy Kalyan	Mary Madam	Posthumously released

=== Tamil ===
Year	Film	Role	Notes
2003	Dhool	Sornakka	
2004	Super Da	Gangamma	
2005	Sivakasi	Mulli Mungaari	credited as Shaktuntala
2007	Madurai Veeran	Mayandi's sister	
2007	Thiru Ranga		
2009	Oru Kadhalan Oru Kadhali		

=== Kannada ===
Year	Film	Role	Notes
2005	Auto Shankar	Kalamma	
2006	Ajay	Durga	
2009	Kannadada Kiran Bedi	Bhadramma	

=== Television ===
- 2000 - Santhi Nivasam
