= Nalamasa Krishna =

Indian activist (born 1979)

- Born: 1979 (age 46–47); Andhra Pradesh, India
- Education: Osmania University; English and Foreign Languages University
- Occupation: Social activist
- Years active: 2010–present

Nalamasa Krishna is a left-wing social activist and a lawyer from Telangana, India.

== Early life and education ==
Krishna was born in 1979 to a middle-class family in erstwhile Andhra Pradesh. He then pursued his Master of Arts and Bachelor of Laws from Osmania University and a doctoral degree from English and Foreign Languages University.

== Career ==
Besides practicing law, he served as vice-president of Telangana Praja Front, a regional political movement which was formed as a Telangana separatist organisation, demanding statehood for the Telangana region that was then a part of Andhra Pradesh.

In recent years, he was active in anti-Uranium mining struggle in Nallamala Forest area and also participated in public protests in the aftermath of Gauri Lankesh's murder.

In October 2019, Telangana police arrested Nalamasa Krishna, vice-president of the Telangana Praja Front (TPF), along with Bandari Maddileti, president of the Telangana Vidyarthi Vedika (TVV), in connection with a case involving alleged links to the Communist Party of India (Maoist). According to the police, the two were involved in activities including recruitment and collection of funds for the organisation in urban areas. These allegations were reported by the police and were not findings of guilt.

Following the arrests, the Telangana High Court questioned whether the police had complied with the arrest procedures prescribed under Section 41-B of the Code of Criminal Procedure and directed the police to submit a counter-affidavit. The court observed that failure to follow the mandatory procedures could render an arrest illegal. A subsequent habeas corpus petition filed by the wives of Krishna and Maddileti was dismissed after the State produced the relevant arrest and remand records before the court.

In June 2020, the National Investigation Agency (NIA) arrested Krishna in a separate investigation concerning alleged links with the CPI (Maoist). The agency alleged that he had supported and furthered the activities of the organisation through groups including the TPF and TVV. On 28 August 2020, the NIA filed a chargesheet against Krishna and three others in the case under provisions of the Indian Penal Code, the Telangana Public Security Act and the Unlawful Activities (Prevention) Act. Krishna was granted bail in August 2020 and was subsequently released from Cherlapally jail.
