= Orey Riksha =

1995 film by Dasari Narayana Rao

- Directed by: Dasari Narayana Rao
- Written by: Dasari Narayana Rao
- Starring: R. Narayana Murthy; Ravali; Raghunatha Reddy
- Cinematography: Ch. Ramana Raju
- Edited by: B. Krishnam Raju
- Music by: Vandemataram Srinivas
- Production company: Dasari Film University
- Release date: 9 November 1995
- Running time: 141 mins
- Country: India
- Language: Telugu

Orey Riksha (transl. Hey, rickshaw puller) is a 1995 Indian Telugu-language drama film written and directed by Dasari Narayana Rao, and produced by Dasari Film University. It stars R. Narayana Murthy, Ravali and Raghunatha Reddy. It features music composed by Vandemataram Srinivas.

The film was released on 9 November 1995 and emerged as a commercial success, eventually attaining a cult following. The film received three Nandi Awards.

== Cast ==
- R. Narayana Murthy as Suryam
- Ravali
- Raghunatha Reddy as Venkataratnam
- Anuradha
- Poojitha
- Mukka Narasinga Rao
- Sri Divya
- Siva Parvathi
- Narra Venkateswara Rao
- Mukku Raju
- M. S. Narayana

== Production ==
Filmmaker Dasari Narayana Rao who facing financial troubles began writing a film for T. Krishna. However, the project was put on hold following Krishna's death from cancer. Dasari's disciple R. Narayana Murthy accepted the offer to play the film's lead and the film began its production.

== Soundtrack ==
The film has score and soundtrack composed by Vandemataram Srinivas. The soundtrack consists eight songs of which two songs have lyrics written by Dasari Narayana Rao ("Jaagore", "Amma Kanna") while the other six were written by Gaddar who did not take any remuneration. "Nee Padam Meeda Puttu Machanai Chellemma" was particularly successful while "Naa Raktham Tho Naduputhanu Rikshanu" was not originally composed for the film. The songs were recorded by S. P. Balasubrahmanyam, Srinivas, K. S. Chithra and Manjala Srinivas.

Track listing
No.	Title	Lyrics	Singer(s)	Length
1.	"Jaagore"	Dasari Narayana Rao	Vandemataram Srinivas, Manjala Srinivas
2.	"Naa Raktham Tho Naduputhanu Rikshanu"	Gaddar	S. P. Balasubrahmanyam
3.	"Aapura Rikshowda"	Gaddar	K. S. Chithra
4.	"Jatharelli Podame"	Gaddar	S. P. Balasubrahmanyam
5.	"Rajyangam Chattamandu"	Gaddar	Vandemataram Srinivas
6.	"Malle Theegaku Pandiri Vole (Nee Padam Meeda Puttu Machanai Chellemma)"	Gaddar	Vandemataram Srinivas
7.	"Amma Kanna"	Dasari Narayana Rao	Vandemataram Srinivas
8.	"Gana Gana Gana"	Gaddar	Vandemataram Srinivas

== Release and reception ==
Orey Riksha released on 9 November 1995. It clashed with Chiranjeevi and Kodi Ramakrishna's major production Rikshavodu that released in December 1995. While both Orey Rickshaw and Rikshavodu featured a rickshaw puller as its protagonist, only Orey Rickshaw emerged successful at the box office. Chiranjeevi, who attended 100th day ceremony of the film, commented that Orey Rickshaw won the rickshaw race between the two films.

Following the film's success, Dasari went onto to make another revolutionary-themed film Osey Ramulamma (1997) led by Vijayashanti which also became a success.

== Awards ==
The film received three Nandi Awards, including Best Male Playback Singer for Vandemataram Srinivas and Best Lyricist for Gaddar (both for the song "Malle Theegaku Pandiri Vole"), in addition to Best Character Actress for Shivaparvati. Srinivas and Gaddar, however, chose to turn down the award.
