= Bhadrachalam (film) =

2001 film by Nimmala Shankar

- Theatrical release poster
- Directed by: N. Shankar
- Written by: Posani Krishna Murali (dialogues)
- Screenplay by: N. Shankar
- Story by: N. Shankar; Krishneswara Rao
- Produced by: Katragadda Lokesh Dutt
- Starring: Srihari; Sindhu Menon
- Cinematography: Jaswanth
- Edited by: Gautham Raju
- Music by: Vandemataram Srinivas
- Production company: Sri Sai Balaji Arts
- Release date: 6 December 2001
- Country: India
- Language: Telugu

Bhadrachalam is 2001 Indian Telugu-language action sports film directed by N. Shankar, starring Srihari and Sindhu Menon in the lead roles.

== Plot ==
Parasuram, a Taekwondo coach, faces a life-altering event when one of his disciples betrays him. After a confrontation, he sets out to find a new protégé. During his journey, he suffers a heart attack and is hospitalized. To cover his medical expenses, his daughter, Mahalakshmi, comes to the village to sell some land. While struggling to sell the property, they meet Bhadrachalam, a strong and capable man who assists Parasuram with his physical strength. Impressed by Bhadrachalam's potential, Parasuram decides to train him in Taekwondo. The story then follows Bhadrachalam’s development under Parasuram’s guidance as he strives to become the next champion.

== Cast ==
- Srihari as Bhadrachalam
- Sindhu Menon as Mahalakshmi
- Vijayachander as Parasuram
- Kazan Khan as Suraj
- Roopa
- Kota Srinivasa Rao
- Mallikarjuna Rao
- Brahmanandam
- M.S. Narayana
- Babu Mohan
- AVS
- Prasad Babu
- Narra Venkateswara Rao
- Raja Ravindra
- Gundu Hanumantha Rao
- Gautam Raju
- Shanoor Sana
- Nisha
- Jeeva as Police Inspector

== Music ==
All songs were composed by Vandemataram Srinivas.

Title	Singers
"Okate Jananam"	Shankar Mahadevan, K. S. Chitra
"Oh Oh Cheliya"	Kumar Sanu, Swarnalatha
"Kuda Kuda Roadula"	Udit Narayan, Swarnalatha
"Cheneta Cheerakatti"	Kavita Krishnamurthy, Jaspinder Narula
"Ede Naa Palletooru"	Vandemataram Srinivas, usha

== Reception ==
Telugucinema.com reviewed the film as a sports drama emphasizing the importance of supporting village sports, with solid performances but a need for better editing in the second half.

== Awards ==
- The film won Nandi Award for Best Fight Master - Vijayan
