= Gaddar =

Indian poet and activist (1949–2023)

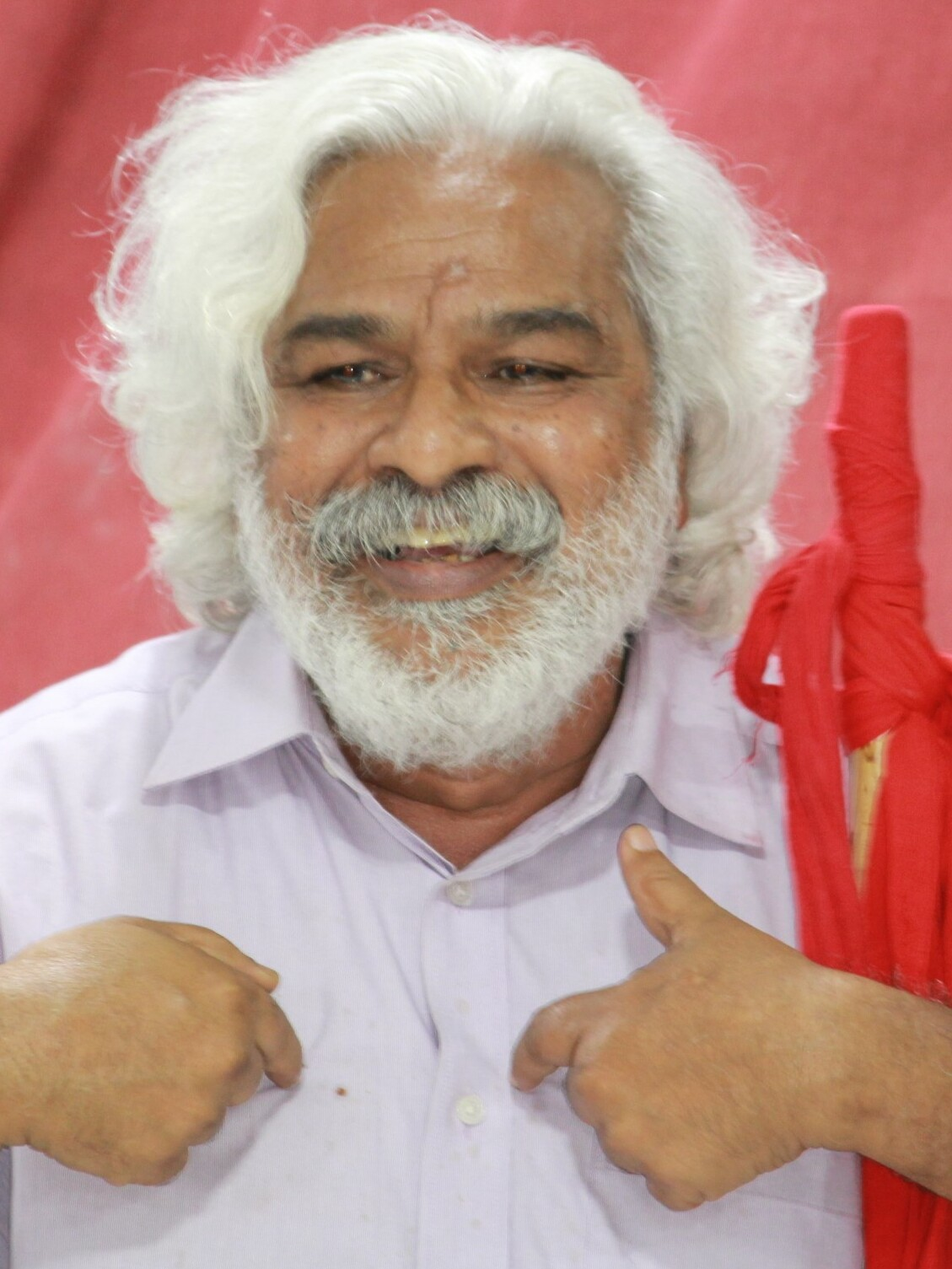
- Rao in 2005

Personal details
- Born: Gummadi Vittal Rao; 31 January 1949 Toopran, Hyderabad State, Dominion of India Present In Medak District Telangana
- Died: 6 August 2023 (aged 74) Hyderabad, Telangana, India
- Party: Telangana Praja Front
- Spouse: Vimala Gaddar
- Education: Osmania University
- Occupation: Poet; Folk singer; Balladeer; Politician; Maoist; Ambedkarite

Gummadi Vittal Rao (31 January 1949 – 6 August 2023), better known as Gaddar, was an Indian poet, singer, and communist revolutionary. Gaddar was active in the Naxalite–Maoist insurgency, as well as the movement for Telangana's statehood.

Gaddar began his political and cultural journey as a Naxalite in the 1970s. Arrested during the Emergency in 1975, he later went underground. Despite numerous controversies, he remained a prominent voice against caste oppression and the injustices faced by Dalits and Adivasis. He was one of the founding members of the cultural wing of the Communist Party of India (Marxist-Leninist) People’s War. and also founded the Jana Natya Mandali. He played a major role in drawing national attention to the Karamchedu massacre in 1987.

He was awarded with a cash award of ₹1 crore posthumously for his contributions to the Telangana movement.

== Early life ==
Gaddar was born as Gummadi Vithal Rao in Toopran in the Medak district of Telangana in 1949. While studying engineering in Hyderabad, he became influenced by the revolutionary ideas of the Dalit Panthers and the Naxalbari movement.

Gaddar went underground in the 1980s and became a member of the Communist Party of India (Marxist–Leninist) People's War. He was part of its cultural wing and performed for large crowds. A bullet remained in his spine after an assassination attempt in 1997.

Until 2010, Gaddar was active in the Naxal movement, later identifying himself as an Ambedkarite. He adopted the name Gaddar as a tribute to the pre-independence Gadar party, which opposed British colonial rule in Punjab.

== Telangana movement ==
With the resurgence of the Telangana movement, Gadar expressed his support for the cause of a separate Telangana state, which intended to uplift the lower castes, particularly dalits and backward castes. He said that he was strongly aligned with those who are for a state in favor of social justice where scheduled tribes and scheduled castes have political representation on par with the OCs and BCs of the state. He expressed his solidarity with Devender Goud's NTPP (Nava Telangana Praja Party) despite being shot at by the police during Goud's term as AP home minister.

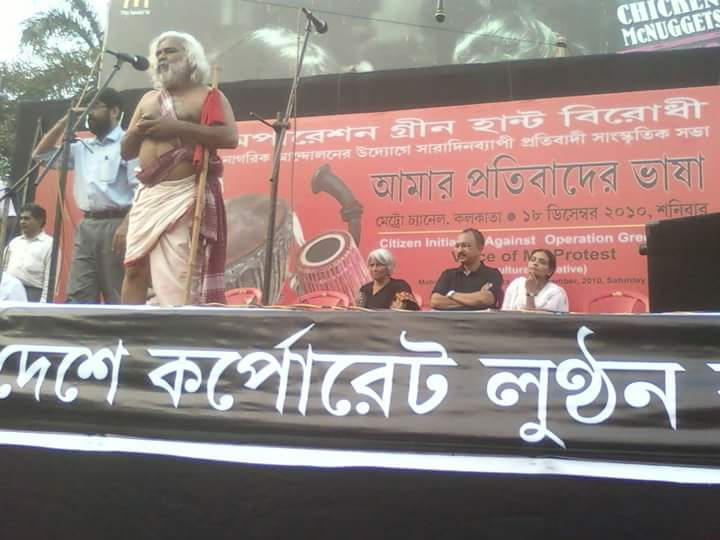
Gaddar performing in Kolkata in 2010 against Operation Green Hunt

== Illness and death ==
Suffering from severe heart disease, Gaddar was admitted to a Hyderabad hospital on 20 July 2023 where he underwent bypass surgery on 3 August 2023. While recovering from surgery, he died from lung and urinary complications on 6 August 2023 at the age of 74.

== Discography ==
Year	Movie	Song	Lyricist	Notes	Ref.
1979	Maa Bhoomi	Bandenaka Bandi Katti	Bandi Yadagiri		
1983	Rangula Kala	Jam Jammalmarri	Devi Priya	Also actor	
1983	Rangula Kala	Bhadram Koduko	Guda Anjaiah	Also actor	
1983	Rangula Kala	Madhana Sundari	Guda Anjaiah	Also actor	
1995	Orey Rikshaw	Malle Theegaku	Gaddar	Also actor	
1995	Orey Rikshaw	Aapura Rikshowda	Gaddar	Also actor	
1995	Orey Rikshaw	Jatharelli Podame	Gaddar	Also actor	
1995	Orey Rikshaw	Naa Raktham Tho Naduputhanu Rikshawnu	Gaddar	Also actor	
1995	Orey Rikshaw	Rajyangam Chattamandu	Gaddar	Also actor	
1995	Orey Rikshaw	Gana Gana Gana	Gaddar	Also actor	
1995	Orey Rikshaw	Amma Kanna	Gaddar	Also actor	
2011	Jai Bolo Telangana	Podustunna Poddumeeda	Gaddar	Also actor	
2011	Poru Telangana	Podustunna Poddumeeda	Gaddar		
2016	Dandakaranyam	Bharata Desam	Gaddar	Also actor	
2016	Dandakaranyam	Podduthirugudu Puvva	Gaddar	Also actor	
2016	Dandakaranyam	Adavi Thalliki Vandanam	Gaddar	Also actor	

== Awards ==
Nandi Awards:

- 1995: Nandi Award for Best Lyricist for "Malletheega Ku Pandiri Vole" from Orey Rikshaw (turned down)
- 2011: Nandi Award for Best Male Playback Singer for Jai Bolo Telangana

== See also ==
- Telangana Praja Front
