= Erra Sainyam =

- Official poster
- Directed by: R. Narayana Murthy
- Written by: P. L. Narayana (dialogues)
- Story by: R. Narayana Murthy
- Produced by: D. V. Raju
- Starring: R. Narayana Murthy; Narra Venkateswara Rao
- Cinematography: R. Narayana Murthy
- Edited by: Mohan-Rama Rao
- Music by: Vandemataram Srinivas
- Production company: Sneha Chitra Pictures
- Release date: 22 July 1994
- Country: India
- Language: Telugu

Erra Sainyam (transl. Red army) is a 1994 Indian Telugu-language action drama film directed by R. Narayana Murthy and starring himself and Narra Venkateswara Rao. The film was screened in the mainstream section of the 26th International Film Festival of India. The film was described as "a runaway hit, with no star cast worth boasting of." It deals with the exploitation of the Girijan tribals and their fight for justice.

== Cast ==
- R. Narayana Murthy as Singanna
- Narra Venkateswara Rao
- Sanjeevi
- Puranam Surya
- Spandana
- Guda Anjaiah as a judge
- Mukku Raju
- Telangana Shakuntala
- Udaya Bhanu as Singanna's sister

== Soundtrack ==
All lyrics are written by Yadagiri, Guda Anjaiah, Mande Satyam, Bhanuri Satyanarayana, Sadasivam; all music is composed by Vandemataram Srinivas

No.	Title	Singer(s)	Length
1.	"Palleletla"	Vandemataram Srinivas	4:52
2.	"Banzare Banzo"	Vandemataram Srinivas	5:11
3.	"Evunnadakko"	Vandemataram Srinivas	5:07
4.	"Bandenaka"	Shankar	5:29
5.	"Palakonda"	Vandemataram Srinivas	6:03
6.	"Ooru Manadira"	S. P. Balasubramanyam	7:02
Total length:			39:38

== Release and reception ==
The film was a box office success in Andhra Pradesh and prompted Narayana Murthy to star in Orey Rikshaw (1995). The film inspired many directors to make films in a similar naxalite-based films.

Goodipoodi Srihari of Sitara Weekly praised Murthy for directing in a political film with a serious subject, and Narayana for his dialogue. Srihari felt that the use of folk songs was the film's strength.

== Cancelled remake ==
The film was to be remade in Hindi as Yeh Dhartee Hamaree Hai (transl. The land is ours) (2007) by Narayana Murthy, who reprised his role, but the film did not enter fruition.
