= Pandanti Samsaram =

- Film poster
- Directed by: Krishna
- Written by: Paruchuri brothers (dialogues)
- Screenplay by: Krishna
- Story by: Paruchuri brothers
- Starring: Krishna; Prithvi; Ravali; Charulatha; Kota Srinivasa Rao
- Edited by: Krishna
- Production company: Padmalaya Studios
- Release date: 18 May 2001
- Country: India
- Language: Telugu

Pandanti Samsaram is a 2001 Indian Telugu-language family drama film directed by Krishna and starring himself, Babloo Prithiveeraj, Ravali , Charulatha and Kota Srinivasa Rao.

== Cast ==
- Krishna as Krishnamanaidu
- Prithvi as Narendra
- Ravali
- Charulatha
- Kota Srinivasa Rao as Chalapathi
- Babu Mohan
- AVS
- Prasad Babu
- Narra Venkateswara Rao
- Gokina Rama Rao
- Sivaji Raja
- Gautam Raju
- Annapoorna
- Suma Kanakala
- Telangana Shakuntala
- Sana

== Production ==
The film began production in February 2001, and Krishna also worked as a director and editor of the film. This film marked the debut of Krishna's two grandsons Ghattamaneni Jaya Krishna and Ashok Galla.

== Soundtrack ==
The music was composed by Vandemataram Srinivas with lyrics by Jaladi. Krishna acted without a mustache for a song in the film; he had never removed his mustache since his role in Thene Manasulu (1965). He played nine roles in another song in the film including Alluri Sitarama Raju, Bhagat Singh, Chatrapati Sivaji, Subash Chandra Bose, and Veerapandya Kattabomman.

== Reception ==
A critic from Full Hyderabad wrote that "The film is so contrived to the core, and there is so little intelligence involved in its making, there is hardly anything in it to talk about".

== Box office ==
The film ran for fifty days in two theatres: Mini Odeon in Hyderabad (now defunct) and Priyadarshini in Vijayawada.
