= Guda Anjaiah =

Indian poet, singer

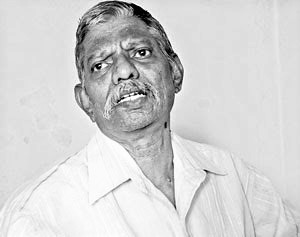
- Born: 1 November 1955; Telangana
- Died: 21 June 2016 (aged 60)
- Other name: Anjanna
- Occupations: Singer poet
- Known for: Telangana agitation
- Spouse: Hema Nalini

Guda Anjaiah (1 November 1955 – 21 June 2016) was an Indian poet, singer, lyricist, and writer from the state of Telangana.

He was awarded a cash award of ₹1 crore posthumously for his contributions to the Telangana movement.

== Early life ==
Guda Anjaiah was born to Lakshmaiah and Laskhmamma in the Lingapuram village of the Dandepalli Mandal, Adilabad district in the year 1955. He was the fifth child amongst his six brothers and a sister in his family. He attended his early schooling in the same village. Later, he completed intermediate studies in Laksettipeta and B.Pharmacy in Hyderabad. His father was educated, and both the parents used to sing the tales of Ramayan, Mahabharata and other folk stories.

== Personal life ==
He was a famous singer in Telangana state. He was born in Lingapur village in Dandepally mandal of Adilabad district in 1955. He survived, unlike three of the daughters. He was a supporter of the Telangana movement. He used to write songs based on the lives of the poor.

== Popular culture ==
Guda Anjaiah, during his schooling wrote the first song Ooru idichi ney poduna, Uri eska sathunna which remarked on the society and drought in Telangana Region. After receiving a huge response from the people and well-known poets, he decided to write about the condition of people in Telangana. His writings and songs challenged the upper castes (Doras, Patels) in Telangana society.

At the age of 16 came his masterpiece, Ooru Manadira, which was first sung at Nalgonda in a meeting organised by the Arunodaya Organisation. It became a massive hit, was later translated into 16 other languages, and featured in the film Erra Sainyam directed by R. Narayana Murthy.

Some of his popular songs are ‘Nenu Raanu Biddo Sarkaaru Davakhaanaku’, ‘Jara Bhadram Koduko, Koduko Komranna’, Pudithokkati Satthe Rendu Rajanna ori Rajanna, Ethhura Telangana Jenda Rajiga ori Rajiga’ etc.

== Telangana Agitation ==
Guda Anjaiah played a significant role in the Telangana agitation. Starting from 1969 Agitation, he was part of the movement. But in the later period of the agitation, he took the lead and toured all Telangana singing his powerful songs which motivated and energised the activists.

He along with Rasamayi Balakrishna started the event Telangana Dhoom Dham a cultural cum educating programme in the Kamareddy city. This event included lectures, speech, and the performance of various folk artists, singers, dancers and poets. Dhoom Dham was a huge hit and was organised in each and every village of Telangana. This event provided a platform for uniting the public, activists and political leaders under one tree.

His songs Rajigo Ore Rajigo (to motivate not to commit suicide in Telangana movement), Na Telangana, Na Telanagana .. Niluvella Gayala Veena,Ayyoniva Nuvvu Avvoniva Telanganoniki Thoti Paloniva (about Andhra settlers in Hyderabad) and others dominated Stage of Dhoom Dham. From 2001 to the achievement of Telangana State he fought, led and dictated the movement through his songs. His role in the Telangana Movement is highly appreciated and praised by Telangana.

== Filmography ==
| Songs | Movie |
|---|---|
| Badram Koduko | Rangula Kala |
| Koduko Bangaru Thandri | Erra Sainyam |
| Lachulo Lachanna | Osey Ramulamma |
| Ooru Manadira | Erra Sainyam |
| Rajigo vore Rajiga | Poru Telangana |
| Ayyoniva neevu Avvoniva | Poru Telangana |

== Other popular songs ==
- Walekum salam walekum Police Anna
- Nenu Rano Biddo Sarkar Dhawakana

== Books ==
- Polimera (Novel)
- Dalitha Kathalu (stories)
- Cinema Patalu

== Awards ==
- Sahithya Bandu Ratna award – 1986
- Rajini Telugu Sahithi Samithi Award −1988
- Ganda Pendera Title – 2000
- Dr. Malaya Sri Sahithi Award −2004
- Suddala Hanumanthu – Janakamma Award – 2015
- Komuram Bheem National Award – 2015
- Telangana Sahithya Puraskaram – 2015

== Death ==
Guda Anjaiah (60 years) died of a kidney ailment while in his house in Raganna Guda village of Hayathnagar Mandal, Rangareddy District on 21 June 2016.
