= Nandi Award for Best Music Director =

Indian Telugu media award

This is a list of the winners of the Nandi Award for Best Music Director since 1977 and the films they have won for.

== List ==
Year	Music Director	Film
1977	Rajan–Nagendra	Panthulamma
1978	M. S. Viswanathan	Naalaga Endaro
1979	K. V. Mahadevan	Sankarabharanam
1980	S. Rajeswara Rao	Sri Vasavi Kanyaka Parameswari Mahatmyam
1981	Ilaiyaraaja	Seethakoka Chiluka
1982	Ramesh Naidu	Meghasandesam
1983	K. Chakravarthy	Neti Bharatham
1984	P. Adinarayana Rao	Suvarna Sundari
1985	S. P. Balasubrahmanyam	Mayuri
1986	K. Chakravarthy	Sravana Meghalu
1987	K. V. Mahadevan	Sruthilayalu
1988	Ilaiyaraaja	Rudra Veena
1989	O. P. Nayyar	Neerajanam
1990	Ilaiyaraaja	Jagadeka Veerudu Athiloka Sundari
1991	K. V. Mahadevan	Manjeera Nadam
1992	M. M. Keeravani	Rajeswari Kalyanam
1993	M. M. Keeravani	Allari Priyudu
1994	Raj–Koti	Hello Brother
1995	M. M. Keeravani	Pelli Sandadi
1996	Madhavapeddi Suresh	Sri Krishnarjuna Vijayam
1997	Vandemataram Srinivas	Osey Ramulamma
1998	Mani Sharma	Choodalani Vundi
1999	Vandemataram Srinivas	Swayamvaram
2000	Vandemataram Srinivas	Devullu
2001	R. P. Patnaik	Nuvvu Nenu
2002	M. M. Keeravani	Okato Number Kurraadu
2003	Mani Sharma	Okkadu
2004	Vidyasagar	Swarabhishekam
2005	M. M. Keeravani	Chatrapathi
2006	KM Radha Krishnan	Godavari
2007	Mickey J Meyer	Happy Days
2008	Mickey J Meyer	Kotha Bangaru Lokam
2009	M. M. Keeravani	Vengamamba
2010	Chakri	Simha
2011	Ilaiyaraaja	Sri Rama Rajyam
2012	M. M. Keeravani; Ilaiyaraaja	Eega; Yeto Vellipoyindhi Manasu
2013	Devi Sri Prasad	Attarintiki Daredi
2014	Anup Rubens	Manam
2015	M. M. Keeravani	Baahubali: The Beginning
2016	Mickey J Meyer	A Aa

=== Most won ===
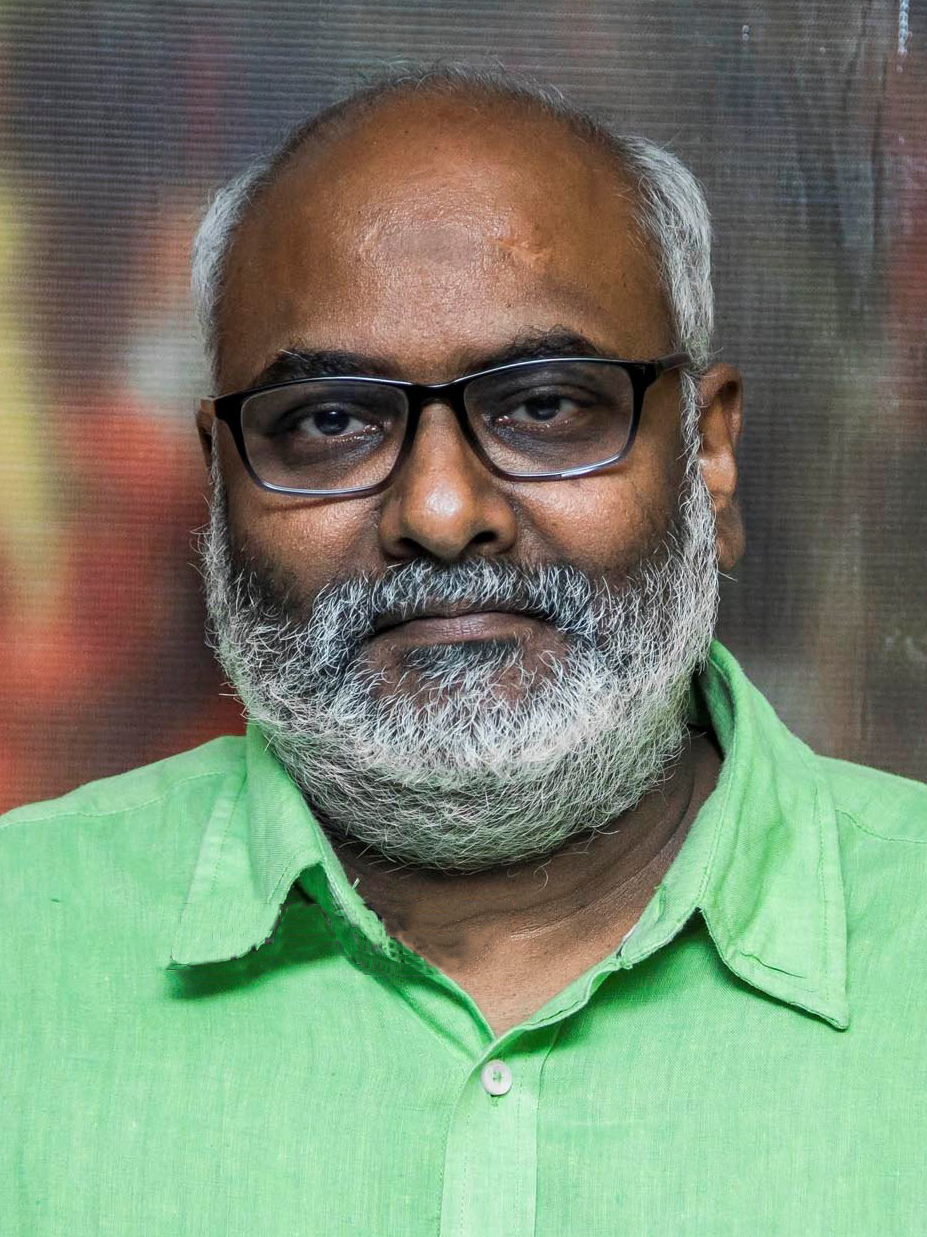
M. M. Keeravani – Most winner

Most won
Artist	Wins
M. M. Keeravani	8
Ilaiyaraaja	5
K. V. Mahadevan	3
Vandemataram Srinivas	3
Mickey J Meyer	3
