= Devullu =

2000 Indian Telugu-language film

- Theateral release poster
- Directed by: Kodi Ramakrishna
- Screenplay by: Kodi Ramakrishna
- Story by: Babu Pictures Unit
- Dialogue by: P. Rajendra Kumar
- Produced by: Chegondi Haribabu; Karatam Rambabu
- Starring: Babloo Prithiveeraj; Raasi; Suman; Srikanth; Rajendra Prasad; Laya
- Cinematography: Kodi Lakshman
- Edited by: Suresh Tata
- Music by: Vandemataram Srinivas
- Production company: Babu Pictures
- Release date: 9 November 2000
- Running time: 149 mins
- Country: India
- Language: Telugu

Devullu (transl. Gods) is a 2000 Telugu-language supernatural film directed by Kodi Ramakrishna. It stars Prithvi, Raasi, Master Nandan, Baby Nitya, while Suman, Srikanth, Rajendra Prasad, Ramya Krishna, Laya were in supporting roles and music was composed by Vandemataram Srinivas. It was produced by Chegondi Haribabu, Karatam Rambabu under the Babu Pictures banner. The film was dubbed in Tamil as Kuzhanthayum Deivamum.

== Cast ==
- Prithvi as Prashanth
- Raasi as Nirmala
- Allu Rama Lingaiah as Contractor
- Ali as Street Magician
- M. S. Narayana as Lawyer
- Tanikella Bharani as TV Anchor
- A.V.S. as Prashanth's assistant
- Babu Mohan as Major BM Rao, Prashanth's maternal uncle
- Costumes Krishna as Thief
- Prudhvi Raj as Venkateswara
- Radha Bai as Prasanth's mother
- Radha Prasanthi as Nirmala's sister
- Kalpana Rai
- Master Nandan as Chintu
- Baby Nitya as Bhavani

=== Special Appearances ===
- Suman as Venkateswara
- Srikanth as Rama
- Rajendra Prasad as Anjineeya
- S. P. Balasubrahmanyam as Lord Ganesha's Mushaka
- Vijayachander as Sai Baba
- Anil Meka as Lakshmana
- Ramya Krishna as Vijayawada Kanakadurga / Srisailam Bramarambika
- Laya as Sita
- Kalpana as Alamelu
- Master Tanish as Ayyappa

== Soundtrack ==
Devullu

Film score by Vandemataram Srinivas
- Released: 2000
- Genre: Soundtrack
- Length: 39:19
- Label: Aditya Music
- Producer: Vandemataram Srinivas

Vandemataram Srinivas chronology
Adavi Chukka (2000)	Devullu (2000)	Apparaoki Oka Nela Thappindi (2001)

Music composed by Vandemataram Srinivas. Lyrics written by Jonnavithhula Ramalingeswara Rao. Music released on ADITYA Music Company. The songs were very well received.

No.	Title	Singer(s)	Length
1.	"Vakarthunda Mahakaya"	S. P. Balasubrahmanyam	4:48
2.	"Andari Bandhuvayya"	S. P. Balasubrahmanyam	5:43
3.	"Sirulanosagu Sukhashanthulu"	Swarnalatha, Sujatha	5:33
4.	"Maha Kanaka Durga"	S. Janaki	5:10
5.	"Ayyappa Devaya"	S. P. Balasubrahmanyam	5:23
6.	"Nee Prema Kore"	K. S. Chithra, Swarnalatha	4:55
7.	"Shanti Nikethana"	K. S. Chithra, Rajesh Krishnan	5:23
8.	"Govinda Govinda"	S. P. Balasubrahmanyam	1:41
Total length:			39:19

== Reception ==
A critic from Sify wrote that "There are certain discrepancies and loopholes in the script though. While there is no single shot of parents loving their kids, the love for parents shown by the children looks a little strange. However, on the whole the film is quite interesting and for those of the audience who are into religious films, Devulu will be a treat". Andhra Today wrote "With children as main characters, the movie seems to be meant for children. But since kids look for entertainment, this movie may not hold much of an appeal for them. As for the adults, the story is not strong enough nor is the devotional fervor. Gods making dramatic appearance as humans seems unreal. Not much requires to be said about acting. Apart from the kids, most others make fleeting appearances in the scenes".

== Awards ==
- Nandi Award for Best Music Director - Vandemataram Srinivas
