= Telangana Praja Front =

- Founded: 9 October 2010
- Headquarters: Hyderabad, Telangana, India
- Ideology: Separatism and caste upliftment

Telangana Praja Front (TPF) is a regional political movement in the southern Indian state of Andhra Pradesh. It was formed as a Telangana separatist organisation, demanding statehood for the Telangana region that was then a part of Andhra Pradesh.

== History ==
TPF was launched on 9 October 2010 with Gaddar as president. He was specific in saying that it was not a political party but rather intended to be an umbrella body for uniting various action committees that had become somewhat moribund in the preceding months. He did not, however, rule out the possibility of contesting elections at some future time, although some TPF supporters, who were mostly students, said that they would withdraw if it did in fact become a party. The aim at foundation was to get a bill for a separate Telangana state introduced into parliament. Gaddar said that the creation of the new state could only happen through "people's movements and agitations".

Gaddar resigned as president in May 2012, still insisting that a separate state could not be achieved through electoral means. He was replaced by Akula Bhoomaiah, who subsequently died in what has been alleged to be a political murder.

== See also ==
- Nalamasa Krishna
