= Veerabhadra (film) =

- VCD cover
- Directed by: A. S. Ravi Kumar Chowdary
- Written by: Marudhuri Raja (dialogues)
- Screenplay by: Anjaneya Pushpanand; A. S. Ravi Kumar Chowdary
- Story by: Anjaneya Pushpanand
- Produced by: Ambica Krishna; Ambica Ramanjaneyulu
- Starring: Nandamuri Balakrishna; Tanushree Dutta; Sadha
- Cinematography: C. Ramprasad
- Edited by: Gautham Raju
- Music by: Mani Sharma
- Production company: Ambika Cinema Productions
- Release date: 29 April 2006
- Running time: 168 minutes
- Country: India
- Language: Telugu

Veerabhadra is a 2006 Indian Telugu-language action film directed by A. S. Ravi Kumar Chowdary. It stars Nandamuri Balakrishna, Tanushree Dutta and Sadha, with music composed by Mani Sharma. The film was a flop at the box office.

== Plot ==
All due to the zamindarrefusing to give Peddiraju, around 1000 acres of land that he owns near the beach, he had set aside to donate to the poor people who lived there, but which Peddiraju wanted to sell for his own profit.

Parallelly, Malathi professes her love to Murali, and Peddiraju's brothers' attempt to assault him. They fail as Murali's supporters help and threaten Peddiraju's brothers to apologize and leave. The zamindarwho was driving by, is stunned, seeing all the tremendous support and influence of Murali against Peddiraju, and tasks Kondaiah to ask Murali for aid. When Kondaiah goes to ask Murali for aid he finds out Murali is the zamindar's missing grandson when he meets Pothuraju. The zamindar, finds out that Murali is his grandson, and aks Pothuraju to meet. Pothuraju asks for 30 crores to make Murali come back to the zamindarand his family and the zamindaragrees. Pothuraju then kicks Murali out. Immediately, Kondaiah meets Murali and divulges his true heritage. Mallika also meets him and requests help from him.

== Cast ==
- Nandamuri Balakrishna as Murali Krishna
- Tanushree Dutta as Malathi
- Sadha as Ashta Lakshmi
- Sayaji Shinde as Peddiraju
- Prakash Raj as Pothuraju
- Rajan P. Dev as Reddy, Veerabhadra Reddy's grandfather and the zamindar
- Ajay as Peddiraju's brother
- Brahmanandam as Colony resident
- Venu Madhav as Ashta Lakshmi's brother
- Dharmavarapu Subramanyam as Colony resident
- M. S. Narayana as Peddiraju's PA
- Sivaji Raja as Murali's acolyte
- Kovai Sarala as Colony resident
- Rama Prabha as Murali's grandmother
- Rallapalli as Kondaiah
- Kondavalasa Lakshmana Rao as Colony resident
- Gundu Hanumantha Rao as MLA
- Narra Venkateswara Rao as Lawyer
- Ponnambalam as Malesh Yadav
- Padmanabham as Colony Head
- Suthi Velu as Murali's acolyte
- Gautham Raju as Murali's acolyte
- Amit Tiwari as Peddiraju's nephew
- Bandla Ganesh as Murali's acolyte
- Bharath Raju as Peddiraju's brother
- Riyaz Khan as DCP Shankar, Murali's friend
- Lakshmipathi as Colony resident
- Gundu Sudarshan
- Raghunatha Reddy as Doctor
- Vijaya Rangaraju as Corrupt Cop
- KK Sarma as Priest
- Kallu Chidambaram
- Vinod as Jailor
- Prasanna Kumar as Corrupt Cop
- Surya Prakash
- Chitti as Murali's brother
- Shobha Rani
- Sana
- Haritha
- Subhashini as Principal Subhashini
- Ooma
- Sony
- Deepanjali
- Sabiha
- Richa
- Tejaswini

== Production ==
The muhurat for the film took place on 25 June 2005 at Ramanaidu Studios with Dasari Narayana Rao, E. V. V. Satyanarayana, and K. Raghavendra Rao in attendance. The film's title was revealed on 9 March 2006 and had the tagline Manchiki Manchi - punch ki punch.

== Soundtrack ==
Veerabhadra

Film score by Mani Sharma
- Released: 17 March2006
- Genre: Soundtrack
- Length: 29:22
- Label: Supreme Music
- Producer: Mani Sharma

Mani Sharma chronology
Style (2006)	Veerabhadra (2006)	Pokiri (2006)

The music was composed by Mani Sharma and was released on Supreme Music Company. The audio launch was held on 17 March 2006 at Necklace Road in Hyderabad with Shilpa Chakravarthy anchoring the event, which was broadcast on MAA TV and Teja News. In an audio review, NaChaKi of Telugucinema.com rated the album 3.25/5 and wrote, "The tunes are catchy, pushing the rating up, and the apt choice of playback singers has done some good too. Lyrics by less-known lyricists are a refreshing welcome for a big hero's movie!"

No.	Title	Lyrics	Singer(s)	Length
1.	"Janam Kosam"	Bhashasri	Shankar Mahadevan	5:05
2.	"Abbabba"	Bhaskarabhatla	S. P. Balasubrahmanyam, Chitra	4:52
3.	"Aa Eedukondalu"	Bhaskarabhatla	Tippu, Lenina Chowdary	4:59
4.	"Jujibeelallo"	Chinni Charan	KK, Mahalakshmi Iyer	4:49
5.	"Sirimalli"	Sai Harsha	Mallikarjun, Sri Vardhini	4:58
6.	"Boppayi Boppayi"	Chinni Charan	Karthik, Sujatha	4:39
Total length:				29:22

== Reception ==
Jeevi of Idlebrain.com wrote, "This film will cater to the main strength of Bala Krishna, that is masses!"
