= Aaha (1998 film) =

Aaha...!
- Movie poster
- Directed by: Suresh Krishna
- Written by: Suresh Krishna; Posani Krishna Murali (dialogues)
- Based on: Aahaa..! (Tamil)(1997)
- Produced by: Nagarjuna Akkineni
- Starring: Jagapathi Babu; Sanghavi; Jayasudha; Raghuvaran; Bhanupriya
- Cinematography: S. Saravanan
- Edited by: Shankar
- Music by: Vandemataram Srinivas
- Production company: Great India Entertainments
- Release date: 20 November 1998
- Running time: 145 mins
- Country: India
- Language: Telugu

Aaha...! (transl. Wow...!) is a 1998 Indian Telugu-language romance film produced by Nagarjuna Akkineni on Great India Entertainments and directed by Suresh Krissna. It stars Jagapathi Babu, Sanghavi, Jayasudha, Raghuvaran, Bhanupriya and music composed by Vandemataram Srinivas. The film is remake of Krissna's own Tamil film Aahaa..!. The film released to positive reviews and won a South Filmfare Award.

== Cast ==
- Jagapati Babu as Sriram
- Sanghavi as Janaki
- Jayasudha as Rajeswari
- Raghuvaran as Raghuram
- Bhanupriya as Geeta
- Vijayakumar as Parasuram
- Chandra Mohan as Rama Rao
- Raghunatha Reddy as Viswanadham
- Ram Gopalan as Sitaram
- Sameer
- Rajiv Kanakala as Prashanth
- Gautam Raju as Govind
- Chitti Babu as Krishna
- Tirupathi Prakash as Ganapati
- Annapoorna as Parvati
- Varsha as Gayatri
- Radhabai as Parasuram's mother
- Madhavisri
- Uma Sharma
- Master Mahendra as Ajay
- Nagarjuna as narrator

== Production ==
The cast features Vijayakumar and Raghuvaran reprising their roles from the original. Bhanupriya however, played Jayasudha's role in the original, while in the remake she played Sukanya's role.

== Soundtrack ==
Aahaa...!

Film score by Vandemataram Srinivas
- Released: 1998
- Genre: Soundtrack
- Length: 25:49
- Label: Aditya Music
- Producer: Vandemataram Srinivas

Vandemataram Srinivas chronology
Swayamvaram (1999)	Aahaa...! (1998)	Swapnalokam (1999)

Music composed by Vandemataram Srinivas. Lyrics were written by Sirivennela Sitarama Sastry. Music released on Aditya Music Company.

No.	Title	Singer(s)	Length
1.	"Priyuraali Address"	Vandemataram Srinivas	6:18
2.	"Aahvanamandi Andam"	Ramani Maharshi, Harini	4:39
3.	"Manasaina"	Srinivas	4:06
4.	"Suvvi Suvvi"	Unnikrishnan, Malaysia Vasudevan, Sujatha	5:00
5.	"Antyakshari"	Various	5:32
Total length:			25:49

== Reception ==
A critic from Andhra Today rated the film 2/5 stars and wrote, "All kudos to the director for making the movie quite gripping right through, devoid of any redundant scenes. The climax scene that is the life and soul of a movie is excellently depicted". The reviewer, however, concluded that "the efforts of the technicians, actors and the director come to a naught, as the movie has no special feature to appeal to the audience".

== Awards ==
Filmfare Awards

- Filmfare Award for Best Male Playback Singer – Telugu (1998) – Vandemataram Srinivas – "Priyuraali Address"
