= Nandi Award for Best Male Playback Singer =

Indian film award

The Nandi Award for Best Male Playback Singer was commissioned in the year 1977. S. P. Balasubrahmanyam holds the record of winning the most Nandi Awards in this category, having won 19 times. From 2004 onwards, this award was known as Ghantasala Venkateswararao Award for Best Male Playback Singer.

== Winners ==
Year	Singer	Film	Song
1977	Ramesh Naidu	Chillarakottu Chittemma	"Thalli Godaarike"
1978	S. P. Balasubrahmanyam	Naalaga Endaro	
1979	S. P. Balasubrahmanyam	Sankarabharanam	
1980	Not Awarded		
1981	S. P. Balasubrahmanyam	Premaabhishekam	"Aagadu Aagadu"
1982	K. J. Yesudas	Meghasandesam	"Aakasha Desana”
1983	S. P. Balasubrahmanyam	Bahudoorapu Batasari	"Ekkada Thalupulu"
1984	S. P. Balasubrahmanyam	Suvarna Sundari	"Idi Naa Jeevithalapana"
1985	S. P. Balasubrahmanyam	Mayuri	
1986	S. P. Balasubrahmanyam	Sirivennela	"Vidhatha Thalapuna"
1987	S. P. Balasubrahmanyam	Abhinandana	"Rangulalo Kalavo"
1988	K. J. Yesudas	Jeevana Jyoti	"Neeve Namme Jyothi Prema"
1989	S. P. Balasubrahmanyam	Neerajanam	
1990	K. J. Yesudas	Alludugaru	"Nagumomu Ganaleni"
1991	S. P. Balasubrahmanyam	Chanti	
1992	S. P. Balasubrahmanyam	Bangaaru Maama	
1993	S. P. Balasubrahmanyam	Mister Pellam	
1994	S. P. Balasubrahmanyam	Bhairava Dweepam	"Sri Thumbura Narada"
1995	Vandemataram Srinivas	Orey Rikshaw	"Malle Theegaku Pandiri Vole"
1996	Rajesh	Ninne Pelladata	"Eto Vellipoyindi Manasu"
1997	S. P. Balasubrahmanyam	Priyaragalu	"Chinna Chiru Chiru Navvula"
1998	Vandemataram Srinivas	Sri Ramulayya	"Vippa Pula Chettu Siganu"
1999	Hariharan	Annayya	"Hima Seemallo"
2000	S. P. Balasubrahmanyam	Raghavayyagari Abbayi	"Buddha Bhoomi Rudra Bhoomi"
2001	M. M. Keeravani	Student No. 1	"Yekkado Putti"
2002	S. P. Balasubrahmanyam	Vasu	"Paadana Theeyaga"
2003	S. P. Balasubrahmanyam	Seetayya	"Idigo Rayalaseema Gadda"
2004	Sagar	Arya	"Edo Priya Raagam Vintunna"
2005	S. P. Balasubrahmanyam	Pellam Pichodu	"Rupaayive"
2006	K. J. Yesudas	Ganga	"Vellipothunnava"
2007	Karthik	Happy Days	"Oh My Friend"
2008	Shankar Mahadevan	Venkatadri	"Nadha Sandhanam"
2009	S. P. Balasubrahmanyam	Mahatma	"Indiramma Intiperu"
2010	M. M. Keeravani	Maryada Ramanna	"Telugammayi"
2011	Gaddar	Jai Bolo Telangana	"Podustunna Poddumeeda"
2012	Shankar Mahadevan	Shirdi Sai	"Okkade Devudu"
2013	Kailash Kher	Mirchi	"Pandagala Digivacchaavu"
2014	Vijay Yesudas	Legend	"Nee Kanti Choopullo"
2015	M. M. Keeravani	Baahubali: The Beginning	"Shivuni Aana"
2016	Vandemataram Srinivas	Dandakaranyam	"Kammanaina Amma Paata"

=== Most won ===
Most won
Artist	Wins
S. P. Balasubrahmanyam	19
K. J. Yesudas	4
M. M. Keeravani	3
Vandemataram Srinivas	3
Shankar Mahadevan	2
