= Raghunatha Reddy =

Indian actor (1943/1944–2026)

- Born: K. Raghunatha Reddy; 1943 or 1944; Kunderu, Krishna District, Madras Province, British India
- Died: 31 January 2026 (aged 82); Kushaiguda, Hyderabad, Telangana, India
- Occupation: Actor
- Years active: 1991–2026
- Spouse: Annapoorna
- Children: 3

Raghunatha Reddy (1943 or 1944 – 31 January 2026) was an Indian actor who worked in Telugu-language films as a character artist. He is known for his metallic voice.

== Life and career ==
Raghunatha Reddy was born in Krishna District and did his schooling in Vijayawada and Machilipatnam. He initially worked for Lallaguda railway station, which was a part of South Central Railway zone before he was chosen to act in the play Aakasa Ramanna. He had stage experience and won an award for his debut drama competition for HMT Parishad. In Vijaywada, he was a part of the Jyothirmayi acting group. He made his debut in films with the Sobhan Babu-starrer Sarpayagam in 1991, produced by D. Ramanaidu and directed by Paruchuri Brothers after he was spotted in the play Dharmo Rakshita Rakshita. He was frequently cast in films starring R. Narayana Murthy or Mohan Babu notably featuring in Orey Rikshaw (1995). After falling sick in 2008, 2011 and 2014, he gradually stopped acting as frequently in films.

Reddy died on 31 January 2026, at the age of 82.

== Plays ==
- Aakasa Ramanna
- Punarapi Jananam
- Sandhya Chaya
- Dharmo Rakshita Rakshita
- Pallavi
- Amma
- Go to Hell
- Blackmail
- Rependi
- Vinasayacha Drushkrutam
- Muhammad bin Tughlaq
- Manasuna Veligina Deepalu
- Salabhanjikalu
- Rani Rudrama
- Sri Krishna Tulabharam

== Filmography ==
Year	Film	Role	Notes
1988	Kallu		
1991	Sarpayagam		
1992	Mother India	Rajyalakshmi's younger brother	
1992	Nani		
1993	Sabash Ramu		
1993	Prema Chitram Pelli Vichitram		
1993	Radha Sarathi		
1994	M. Dharmaraju M.A.		
1995	Cheemala Dandu		
1995	Orey Rikshaw	Venkataratnam	
1995	Errodu		
1997	Surya Putrulu		
1997	Preminchukundam Raa	Giri's father	
1997	Super Heroes		
1997	Oka Chinna Maata		
1997	Rowdy Durbar	Narasimhayya	
1997	Collector Garu		
1997	Pelli Pandiri	Notla Raghunath Chowdary	
1998	Rajahamsa		
1998	Yuvarathna Rana		
1998	Choodalani Vundi		
1998	Ganesh	Doctor	
1998	Sri Ramulayya		
1998	Pape Naa Pranam		
1998	Subbaraju Gari Kutumbam		
1998	Srimathi Vellosta	Ravi's father	
1998	Aahaa..!	Viswanadham	
1999	Police		
1999	Yamajathakudu	Judge	
1999	Swayamvaram		
1999	Sultan	Minister	
1999	Bharata Ratna	Home Minister	
1999	Preminche Manasu		
1999	Thammudu		
1999	Raja Kumarudu	Rajyalakshmi's brother	
1999	Seenu	Swetha's father	
2000	Rayalaseema Ramanna Chowdary	Seetha's father	
2000	Azad	Mahalakshmi's father	
2000	Sivanna		
2000	9 Nelalu	Doctor	
2000	Uncle	Director General of Police	
2001	Devi Putrudu	Satyavati's father	
2001	Bhalevadivi Basu	Judge	
2001	Dadagiri		
2001	Akasa Veedhilo	Air Force Officer	
2002	Seema Simham	Doctor	
2002	Premalo Pavani Kalyan		
2002	Adrustam	Dhanraj	
2002	Kondaveeti Simhasanam		
2003	Vijayam	Sridhar Rao	
2003	Bheemudu		
2003	Villain		
2003	Ottesi Cheputunna	Lawyer	
2003	Sambhu		
2003	Abhimanyu		
2004	Malliswari	Police Officer	
2004	Swetha Naagu	Praveen's father	Telugu version
2004	Satta		
2004	Love Today		
2004	Madhyanam Hathya		
2004	Siva Shankar		
2004	Letha Manasulu	Bhanu's father	
2005	Balu ABCDEFG	V. Govardhan Rao	
2005	786 Khaidi Premakatha		
2005	Sankranti	Seshagiri	
2005	Modati Cinema		
2005	Bhadra		
2005	Dhana 51		
2005	Gowtam SSC	Sudheer	
2005	Prayatnam		
2005	Bhageeratha	Bullabbai's father	
2006	Sri Ramadasu	Madanna	
2006	Bommarillu	father of Siddhu's friend	
2006	Veerabhadra	Doctor	
2006	Evandoi Srivaru		
2006	Boss		
2006	Samanyudu	Ramunujam	
2006	Sainikudu		
2007	Toss	Agastya	
2008	Okka Magaadu		
2008	Idi Sangathi	Police Officer	
2008	Aatadista	Party Leader	
2008	Sangamam		
2009	Neramu Siksha	Police Inspector	
2009	Sankham	M.P.	
2010	Gaayam 2	I.G.	
2011	Vastadu Naa Raju		
2011	Mugguru		
2011	Sri Rama Rajyam		
2012	Sri Vasavi Vaibhavam		
2018	Subrahmanyapuram		

== Awards ==
- HMT Parishad – Best Actor

He received different awards from various organizations.
