= Veera Telangana =

- Directed by: R. Narayana Murthy
- Written by: R. Narayana Murthy
- Produced by: R. Narayana Murthy
- Starring: R. Narayana Murthy; Vijayaranga Raju; Furqan Ahmed; Krishneswara Rao; Amarendra; Vedavyas; Nataraj; Chakrapani
- Music by: R. Narayana Murthy
- Release date: 9 July 2010
- Country: India
- Language: Telugu

Veera Telangana is a 2010 Indian Telugu film directed by R. Narayana Murthy, based on the Telangana Movement focusing on the formation of the Andhra Mahasabha. The film's cast include R. Narayana Murthy, Vijayaranga Raju.

== Plot ==
Veera Telangana is based on struggle of peasants against the exploitative landlords. Yadagiri (R Narayana Murthy) is a working under local landlord (Vijayaranga Raju). That landlord used to harass the people of the village and treat every village as a bonded labour to him. He usurps the properties of the people and amasses huge wealth and commands the entire village. Even he doesn't allow the children to go to school and become literate and makes them to work in his backyard. At this juncture, Andhra Maha Sabha emerges from the Communist Party of India and the leaders gives a call to the people to revolt against the landlord and also against the Nizam.

The CPI leaders exhort the people that they need not pay any tax on their land and take away the yield to their homes instead of sending them to the landlord's house. This irks the landlord who complains to the Nizam Nawab that the people are revolting against the government and is avoiding payment of tax. So the Nizam Nawab tells his military commander to crush the movement. The military commander, who was a Muslim, starts killing people mercilessly and in addition to the government military, he prepares a group of private army called Razakars and incites them to kill people, who talk against the Islam religion and the Nizam Nawab.

Once a youth takes part in a procession called by Andhra Maha Sabha and succumbs to a bullet injury from the landlord's sister. Landlord orders that nobody should touch the dead body and no one should help in cremating him. But Yadagiri, who was going by that way helps the woman to shift the body for funeral. This irks the landlord and punishes Yadagiri. Not only that, he tries to thrash Yadagiri's mother, which forces Yadagiri to revolt against the landlord and join the Andhra Maha Sabha and takes up a rifle for an armed struggle. How does the Nizam's military commander ruthlessly kill people and how does the Andhra Maha Sabha's army react to the acts? How do they take revenge against the killing of their leaders? Answers to all these question form part of the climax.

== Cast ==
- R. Narayana Murthy as Yadagiri
- Vijayaranga Raju as Landlord
- Purabhan Ahmad
- Krishneswara Rao
- Amarendra
- Vedavyas
- Nataraj
- Chakrapani
