= Suryudu =

- Directed by: Muthyala Subbaiah
- Written by: Posani Krishna Murali (dialogues)
- Story by: K.Bharathi
- Produced by: Medi Konda Venkata Murali Krishna
- Starring: Rajasekhar; Soundarya
- Music by: Vandemataram Srinivas
- Production company: Sri Venkataramana Productions
- Release date: 1 October 1998
- Country: India
- Language: Telugu

Suryudu (transl. Sun), also spelled as Sooryudu, is a 1998 Indian Telugu-language drama film directed by Muthyala Subbaiah. The film stars Rajasekhar, Soundarya, Charan Raj and Srihari, with Annapoorna, Ali, Narra Venkateswara Rao, Jeeva, Venu Madhav and Mallikarjuna Rao playing supporting roles. The film, produced by Medi Konda Venkata Murali Krishna, had musical score by Vandemataram Srinivas and was released on 1998. The film was a remake of the Tamil film Maru Malarchi. The film was a box office success.

== Plot ==
Suryam is the chief of his village. He is kind-hearted and respected by the villagers; they respect him so much that they even erect his statue in the village. Suryam has dedicated his life to the villagers' welfare. In another village, Maheswar Rao is a respected village chief who lives with his uncle's family. Maheswar Rao and his cousin Chakram are known for their short tempers.

Suryam is invited to open a rice shop in a remote village. After the ceremony, Suryam and his car driver baabi are on their way home to their village. Suryam then stops the car in order to buy some fruits in market. In his village, nobody would not take money for his shopping which makes him uncomfortable so he prefers to do shopping in surrounding villages. At the market, Suryam pulls Prameela by the hand to save her from an approaching snake. Unfortunately, only Ali and Suryam seem to have noticed the snake. Prameela makes a big fuss of the event by assuming Suryam to be a rogue. Maheswara Rao and Chakram beat him up in public without taking notice of his defence.

The land broker and family friend Trimurtulu sees the injured Suryam in that village, Suryam says it was just a misunderstanding. The angry Trimurtulu goes to that village and he makes the villagers understand that they have done a huge mistake, he warns that this incident may lead to serious consequences if Suryam's villagers come to know the truth. Maheswar Rao and Chakram realize their mistake and regret the incident. In the meantime, Suryam warns his driver not to talk about the humiliating incident to anyone and pretends the injuries were due to an accident.

Once back home, the man of honour Suryam lies to the villagers that he had a car accident. Baabi, who was frustrated and angry of the incident, in a drunk state disclose the matter to the villagers that same night. Meanwhile, as per his uncle's advice, Maheswara Roa goes on horseback to Suryam's Village on the very night to seek an apology. When he discloses the incident to Suryam's mother, she beats him but Suryam stops her. Maheswar falls at Suryam's feet and begs for an apology, the kind Suryam forgives him and Maheswar returns to his village.

Suryam's villagers get angry after knowing about the incident and they all go to Maheswar village with Aruvals (Billhooks) without warning Suryam. They create a mess in Maheshwar village, and burn their houses. The riot causes the death of many villagers including Maheswar's family and Prameela's mother.

The next morning, Maheswar finally comes to his village, he notes the damage and deaths. The district collector and the police arrive at Suryam's village to tell him to be safe, and that they will now handle the issue between the two villages. Suryam gets furious with his driver and his village people when he learns about the previous night's riot. Maheswar feels betrayed by Suryam and he sees the destruction of Maheswar's Village as Suryam's cunning plan, an angry Maheswar then destroys Suryam's statue in front of Suryam's villagers.

The quod Prameela, Chakram, Narayana Rao and Maheswar vow to take revenge on Suryam in a similarly cunning fashion. Later, Suryam wants to help financially the victims but they refuse his money. Suryam offers to marry Prameela, as she has nobody left in her life to live with but she sees this as an opportunity to destroy Suryam. Both Maheswar and Chakram are also convinced so.

After the marriage, Prameela discovers Suryam's true nature: a golden-hearted man and she becomes a good wife. On the other hand, Maheswar and Chakram still seek vengeance on Suryam. What transpires next forms the rest of the story.

== Cast ==
- Rajasekhar as Suryam
- Soundarya as Prameela
- Charan Raj as Maheswar Rao
- Srihari as Chakram
- Suthivelu as Trimurtulu
- Mallikarjuna Rao as Suryam's uncle
- Annapoorna as Suryam's mother
- Ali as Driver Baabi
- Jeeva as Thief
- Narra Venkateswara Rao as Narayana Rao
- Venu Madhav
- Sudha as Prameela's mother
- Sudhakar
- Kallu Chidambaram
- Tirupathi Prakash
- Mamilla Shailaja Priya
- Raghava Lawrence in a special appearance in "Manasu Petti"
- Raksha in a special appearance

== Soundtrack ==
The soundtrack was composed by Vandemataram Srinivas.

Track list
No.	Title	Lyrics	Singer(s)	Length
1.	"Gal Gal Gal Gal Andelu"	Samavedam Shanmukha Sarma	S. P. Balasubrahmanyam, K. S. Chithra	5:16
2.	"Oh Priya Neekosam"	Sirivennela Seetharama Sastry	S. P. Balasubrahmanyam, K. S. Chithra	5:06
3.	"Selayetiki"	Bhuvana Chandra	K. S. Chithra	5:13
4.	"Maa Thandri Suryuda"	Sirivennela Seetharama Sastry	K. J. Yesudas	5:19
5.	"Vellamma Karthika Jyothi"	Sirivennela Seetharama Sastry	K. S. Chithra	5:03
6.	"Manasu Mamatha Pandindayya"	Sai Harsha	S. P. Balasubrahmanyam, Swarnalatha	5:05
Total length:				31:04

== Reception ==
A critic from Deccan Herald wrote that "There"s a taut script by P Krishnamurali, good direction by Muthyala and controlled acting by Rajashekar". A critic from Andhra Today rated the film three out of five stars and wrote that "It is an out and out director's movie and he has successfully picturized the important scenes of the movie using all his skills. It is to his credit that Muthyala Subbayya could neatly portray the nature of the characters with aplomb". Andhra Online wrote "It certainly appears that the script for the film was made with Rajasekhar in mind".
