= Mallampeta =

- Village
- Interactive map of Mallampeta
- Location in Andhra Pradesh, India
- Coordinates: 17.4061°N 82.365°E
- Country: India
- State: Andhra Pradesh
- District: Kakinada
- Mandal: Rowthulapudi

Area
  - Total: 250 km^{2} (97 sq mi)

Languages
  - Official: Telugu
- Time zone: UTC+5:30 (IST)

Mallampeta is a village in Kakinada district of the Indian state of Andhra Pradesh. It is located in Rowthulapudi Mandal.

== Geography ==
Mallampeta is located in the east part of India. It has an average elevation of 150 metres (1067 ft).

== Demographics ==
Mallampeta's total population is 2658; 53% male and 47% female.
