= Poru Telangana =

- Directed by: R. Narayana Murthy
- Written by: R. Narayana Murthy
- Produced by: R. Narayana Murthy
- Starring: R. Narayana Murthy
- Music by: R. Narayana Murthy
- Release date: 16 September 2011
- Country: India
- Language: Telugu

Poru Telangana is a 2011 Indian Telugu-language drama film directed by R. Narayana Murthy. The star cast includes R. Narayana Murthy. The other leading role of Telangana martyr Srinivasa Chary was portrayed by debutant Rameez Ahmed. Gaddar won the Nandi Award for Best Male Playback Singer.

== Plot ==
Poru Telangana is a film about the 2009–11 Telangana movement. A few students decide to participate in the movement for the creation of the separate state of Telangana, owing to a lack of employment opportunities.

== Cast ==
- R. Narayana Murthy as Jithender Reddy
- Rameez Ahmed as Srinivasa Chary, Telangana martyr

== Soundtrack ==
No.	Title	Lyrics	Singer(s)	Length
1.	"Chudu Telangana"	Ande Sri	Mitra	4:49
2.	"Raathi Bommallona Koluvaina Shivuda"	Mittapally Surendar	Nitya Sanshini	6:40
3.	"Osmania Campuslo"	Abhinaya Srinivas	Vandemataram Srinivas	4:35
4.	"Raajiga Ori Raajiga"	Guda Anjaiah	Vandemataram Srinivas	4:35
5.	"Ayyoniva Nuvvu Avvoniva Telanganoniki Thoti Paaloniva"	Guda Anjaiah	Telu Vijaya	6:00
6.	"Gnanam Okadi Sottu"	Vangapandu Prasad Rao	Vandemataram Srinivas	6:00
7.	"Entho Sahasamaindhi"	Abhinaya Srinivas	Mitra	5:15
8.	"Telangana Vachedaka"	Suddala Rajaiah	Vandemataram Srinivas	5:15
9.	"Podustunna Poddumeeda"	Gaddar	Gaddar	5:21
