= Narra Venkateswara Rao =

Indian actor

- Occupation: Actor
- Years active: 1974-2009

Narra Venkateswara Rao was an Indian actor known for his works in Telugu cinema.

== Career ==
He acted in over 500 films spanning more than three decades. Some of his hit films include Yuvatharam Kadilindi (1980), Neti Bharatam (1983), Kartavyam (1990), and Osey Ramulamma (1997). His last film was Mesthri (2009).

== Death ==
Rao died of cancer on 27 December 2009 at the age of 62 years.

== Filmography ==
=== Films ===
- Chaduvu Samskaram (1974)
- Sahasavanthudu (1978) as Police Inspector
- Shri Vinayaka Vijayamu (1979) as Indra
- Yuvatharam Kadilindi (1980)
- Kaksha (1980)
- Prema Tarangalu (1980)
- Prema Kanuka (1981)
- Maro Kurukshetram (1981)
- Pralaya Rudrudu (1982) as Sarvarayudu's Accomplice
- Kalahala Kapuram (1982) as Whitey
- Nivuru Gappina Nippu (1983)
- Chandirani (1983)
- Neti Bharatam (1983)
- Gudachari No.1 (1983)
- Dandayaatra (1984)
- Bharatamlo Sankharavam (1984)
- Merupu Dadi (1984)
- Pralaya Simham (1984) as Ranga
- Chattamtho Poratam (1985) as Inspector
- Punnami Rathri (1985)
- Vande Mataram (1985)
- Adavi Donga (1985)
- Kattula Kondayya (1985)
- Pratigathana (1985)
- Nireekshana (1986) as Arjuna Rao Inspector
- Repati Pourulu (1986)
- Ashtalakshmi Vaibhavam (1986)
- Dharmapeetam Daddarillindi (1986)
- Jayam Manade (1986) as Public Prosecutor
- Prajaswamyam (1987) as C.I. Veerabhadraiah
- Sankeerthana (1987)
- Rotation Chakravarthy (1987)
- Chakravarthy (1987)
- Ida Prapancham (1987)
- Collector Gari Abbayi (1987)
- Ajeyudu (1987)
- Dharmapatni (1987)
- Maa Voori Magadu (1987) as Lal
- Rowdy No.1 (1988) as Sub-Inspector of Police
- Ugranethrudu (1988) as Nayudamma
- Aswaddhama (1988) as DSP Kumar
- Inspector Pratap (1988)
- Jeevana Jyothi (1988)
- Bandipotu (1988) as Vaddikasulu
- August 15 Raatri (1988)
- Sagatu Manishi (1988)
- Manchi Donga (1988)
- Nava Bharatham (1988)
- Chattamto Chadarangam (1988) as Narasimhulu
- Nyaniki Siksha (1988) as Papa Rao
- Agni Keratalu (1988) as Partho
- Ukku Sankellu (1988)
- Bharata Nari (1989)
- Poola Rangadu (1989)
- Agni (1989)
- Mouna Poratam (1989)
- Praja Theerpu (1989)
- Bhooporatam (1989)
- Chinnari Sneham (1989)
- Vijay (1989)
- Simha Swapnam (1989)
- Manchivaaru Maavaaru (1989)
- State Rowdy (1989)
- Palnati Rudraiah (1989) as Lakshmipathi
- Jayasimha (1990) as Paidithalli
- Aggiramudu (1990)
- Neti Charitra (1990) as Sub-Inspector of Police
- Kartavyam (1990) as Defence Lawyer
- Yerra Mandaram (1991)
- Atiradhudu (1991) as Lawyer Sanyasi Rao
- Jagannatakam (1991)
- Minor Raja (1991)
- Prema Thapassu (1991)
- Manchi Roju (1991)
- Peddarikam (1992)
- Pranadaata (1992)
- Chinarayudu (1992)
- Repati Koduku (1992)
- Collector Gari Alludu (1992) as M.L.A. Venkatasamy
- Lathi (1992) as Police Constable
- Jagannatham & Sons (1992)
- Antham / Drohi (1992)
- Major Chandrakanth (1993)
- Nakshatra Poratam (1993)
- Paruvu Prathishta (1993)
- Donga Alludu (1993)
- Pelli Gola (1993)
- Chirunavvula Varamistava (1993)
- Illu Pelli (1993)
- Vinta Kodallu (1993)
- Cheemala Dandu (1994)
- Ammayi Kapuram (1994)
- Punya Bhoomi Naa Desam (1994)
- Gang Master (1994)
- Erra Sainyam (1994)
- Big Boss (1995)
- Orey Rikshaw (1995)
- Badilli (1995)
- Sankalpam (1995)
- Khaidi Inspector (1995) as D.S.P. Ratnam
- Aadaalla Majaka (1995)
- Topi Raja Sweety Roja (1995)
- Hello Neeku Naaku Pellanta (1996)
- Amma Durgamma (1996)
- Akka! Bagunnava? (1996)
- Osey Ramulamma (1997) as Ramaswamy
- Rowdy Durbar (1997)
- Collector Garu (1997)
- Pelli Chesukundam (1997)
- Super Heroes (1997)
- Pavitra Prema (1998)
- Cheekati Suryulu (1998)
- Sri Ramulayya (1998)
- Tholi Prema (1998)
- Suryudu (1998)
- Eshwar Alla (1998)
- Subhavartha (1998)
- Premante Idera (1998)
- Kante Koothurne Kanu (1998)
- Prema Kosam (1999)
- Sultan (1999)
- Rythu Rajyam (1999)
- Krishna Babu (1999)
- Sammakka Sarakka (2000)
- Sivanna (2000)
- Ravanna (2000)
- Adavi Chukka (2000) as Venkayya
- Sri Srimati Satyabhama (2000)
- Uncle (2000)
- Pandanti Samsaram (2001)
- Chinna (2001)
- Snehamante Idera (2001)
- Friends (2002)
- Vooru Manadiraa (2002)
- Police Sisters (2002)
- Indra (2002) as Superintendent of Police
- Dhanush (2003)
- Tiger Harischandra Prasad (2003)
- Varsham (2004) as Home Minister
- Seshadri Naidu (2004)
- Chanti (2004) as MLA's father-in-law
- Devi Abhayam (2005)
- Adirindayya Chandram (2005) as Chandram's father
- Nuvvostanante Nenoddantana (2005) as Muddu Krishnaiyya
- Veerabhadra (2006)
- Pournami (2006) as a village head sarpanch
- Operation Duryodhana (2007)
- Lakshmi Kalyanam (2007)
- Aatadista (2008)
- Mesthri (2009)

=== Television ===
- Kasthuri (Tamil, Sun TV)

== See also ==
- Kamma (caste)
