= R. Narayana Murthy =

Indian actor and filmmaker (born 1954)

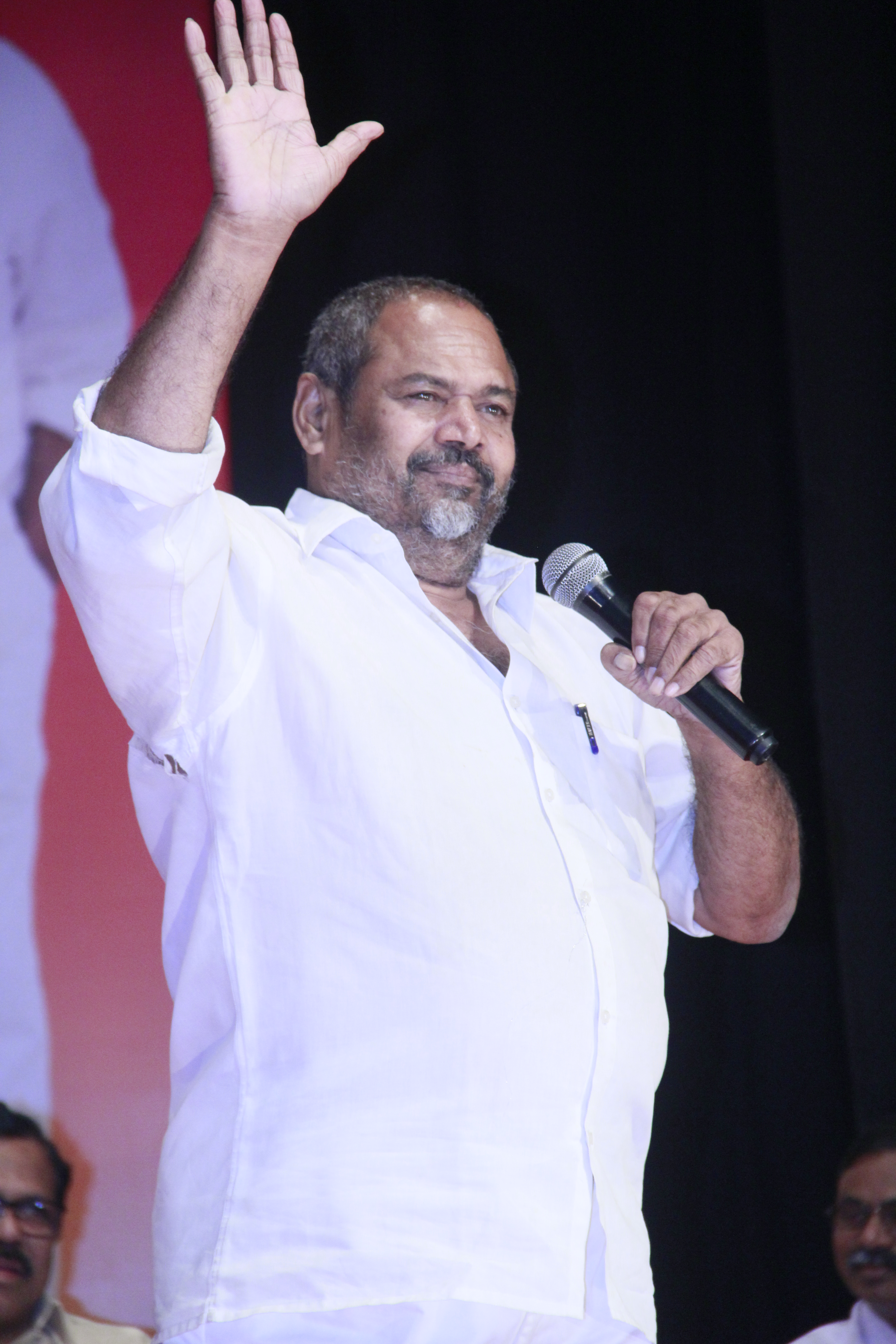
- Murthy in 2019
- Born: Reddy Narayana Murthy; 31 December 1954 (age 71); Mallampeta, Andhra State, India (now in Andhra Pradesh, India)
- Occupations: Actor; film director; screenwriter; producer; composer
- Years active: 1973–present
- Children: 1
- Awards: Nandi Special Jury Award

Reddy Narayana Murthy (born 31 December 1954) is an Indian actor and filmmaker known for his work in Telugu cinema. He is recognized for creating socially conscious films that address issues such as social justice, class struggle, unemployment, crony capitalism, environmental concerns, land disputes, and political unrest. His films often portray the exploitation of marginalized communities and the challenges faced by the lower strata of society.

Murthy produces most of his films under the banner Sneha Chitra Pictures and is noted for his left-oriented approach to storytelling. He frequently explores themes of systemic oppression and social inequalities, particularly highlighting the atrocities committed by dominant classes.

Murthy has acted in several notable films, including Ardharatri Swatantram (1986), Adavi Diviteelu (1990), Laal Salaam (1992), Dhandora (1993), Erra Sainyam (1994), Cheemala Dandu (1995), Dalam (1996), Cheekati Suryudu (1998), Vooru Manadiraa (2002), and Vegu Chukkalu (2004). His work in Dhandora (1993) earned him the Nandi Special Jury Award.

== Early life ==
R. Narayana Murthy was born on 31 December 1954 in Mallampeta, a village in the Kakinada district of Andhra Pradesh. He completed his schooling in Sankhavaram and later moved to Madras after finishing his intermediate studies, aspiring to pursue a career in the film industry. He initially worked as a junior artist in the Krishna-starrer Neramu Siksha (1973). However, on the advice of director Dasari Narayana Rao, he returned to his studies and completed a Bachelor of Arts (B.A.) degree in Peddapuram.

== Career ==
After completing his degree, Murthy returned to Madras to pursue acting. He played a supporting role in the film Needa (1979) and appeared in notable films such as Korikale Gurralaithe (1979), Sita Ramulu (1980), Agni Poolu (1981), and Viswaroopam (1981). His collaboration with Dasari Narayana Rao led to prominent roles in Sangeeta (1981) and Orey Rickshaw (1995), which established him as a lead actor.

Murthy launched his production house, Sneha Chitra Pictures, in Rampachodavaram on 10 June 1984. His debut production, Ardharatri Swatantram, was released in November 1986. The film was well-received, earning Murthy recognition as a filmmaker known for left-leaning and socially conscious themes.

From 1986 to 2018, Murthy produced and directed 29 films under the Sneha Chitra Pictures banner. His works addressed various social issues and resonated with audiences, achieving significant box office success. Many of his films enjoyed long theatrical runs, with several celebrating silver jubilees (25 weeks).

== Filmography ==
Year	Film	Role	Notes
1973	Neramu Siksha	Villager	Special appearance in the song "Ramuni Bantunura"
1978	Pranam Khareedu		
1979	Needa		
1979	Korikale Gurralaithe		
1979	Anthuleni Vintha Katha	Nagabhushanam	
1980	Sita Ramulu		
1981	Agni Poolu	Raju	
1981	Sangeeta		
1981	Viswaroopam	Murthy	
1982	Pratigna	Ramudu	
1983	Iddaru Kiladilu		
1983	M. L. A. Yedukondalu		
1984	Sardar	Sivaprasad	
1984	Kondaveeti Nagulu	Ramudu	
1986	Ardharatri Swatantram		Also director and screenwriter
1988	Alochinchandi		Also director and screenwriter
1988	Nyayaniki Siksha	Reporter	
1989	Bhooporatam		
1990	Adavi Diviteelu		Also director and screenwriter
1991	Swatantra Bharatam		
1992	Laal Salaam		
1993	Dandora		
1994	Erra Sainyam	Singanna	Also director and story writer
1995	Cheemala Dandu		
1995	Orey Rikshaw	Suryam	
1995	Errodu		
1996	Aranyam		
1996	Raitu Rajyam		
1997	Dalam		
1997	Singanna		
1998	Cheekati Suryulu		
1998	Telugodu		
1999	Koolanna		
2000	Chalo Assembly		Also director, producer, and screenwriter
2002	Vooru Manadiraa	Bheemudu	Also director, screenwriter, and producer
2003	Bheemudu	Bheemudu	
2003	Vegu Chukkalu		Also director, screenwriter, producer, and composer
2004	Gangamma Jaatara		
2005	Amma Meeda Ottu		
2006	Adavi Biddalu		
2008	Andamaina Manasulo		Special appearance
2008	Erra Samudram		
2008	Devarakonda Veeraiah		As director, screenwriter, and producer
2010	Veera Telangana	Yadagiri	Also director, screenwriter, producer, and composer
2011	Poru Telangana	Jithender Reddy	Also director, screenwriter, producer, and composer
2012	People's War		
2013	Nirbhaya Bharatham		Also director and screenwriter
2014	Rajyadhikaram		
2016	Dandakaranyam	Koteswara Rao	Also director, screenwriter, producer, and composer
2017	Head Constable Venkataramayya		
2018	Annadaatha Sukheebhava		Also director and screenwriter
2019	Marketlo Prajaswamyam		Also director and screenwriter
2020	Solo Brathuke So Better	Murthy	
2025	University		Also director and screenwriter
