= Osey Ramulamma =

- Promotional poster
- Directed by: Dasari Narayana Rao
- Written by: Dasari Narayana Rao
- Starring: Vijayashanti; Dasari Narayana Rao; Rami Reddy
- Cinematography: Shyam K. Naidu
- Music by: Vandemataram Srinivas
- Production company: Dasari Film University
- Release date: 7 March 1997
- Running time: 165 minutes
- Country: India
- Language: Telugu
- Budget: 2 to 2.5 Crores
- Box office: 8 to 12 crores

Osey Ramulamma is a 1997 Indian Telugu-language action drama film written and directed by Dasari Narayana Rao. The film is based on a woman's rebellion in Telangana and stars Vijayashanti as the title character. Rao and Rami Reddy also star while Krishna makes a cameo appearance.

Osey Ramulamma became a sensational blockbuster upon its release receiving unanimous praise for its Plot, Direction and Vijayashanti's performance. The film also remained one of the very few lady-oriented films achieving a big success. The film also eventually won Nandi Award for Best Actress and Best Music Direction. The film premiered at the 1998 International Film Festival of India in the mainstream section.

== Plot ==
Ramulamma is born into the Dalit caste, making her an "untouchable", in the village. At the age of 13, she is impregnated by the Dora, Jagannayak Patwari. After giving birth to the baby, Patwari learns of its existence. He orders his men to throw the baby away and kill Ramulamma. The baby is found by Naxalites and raised by them. Injured, Ramulamma is taken care of, by a Dalit couple, who treat her as their sister. They live in a typical feudal village in Telangana, where the Doralu (feudal lords), exploit peasants in the name of bonded labour and debts. Ramulamma is asked to work at the palace of the Dora, as a maid for the Dorasani, the wife of the Dora.

One day, Patwari's son attempts to rape Ramulamma. She kills him in his bed. Learning of this, Patwari tries to kill Ramulamma, but she is rescued by Komaranna, a naxalite leader, and is taken to the forest, where Komaranna and the other naxalites live.

She learns their ideology, begins to believe in it, and gradually becomes the leader, after Komaranna steps down. Meanwhile, Ramulamma's son is killed by Patwari. CBI officer, Krishna, who was sent by the Central Government to look into the Naxalite issue, convinces Ramulamma and Komaranna to surrender. But later, he finds that the central government is corrupt and that the Doras are ruling it. He learns that Ramulamma is to be killed by the Dora. He helps Ramulamma escape from jail, but Komaranna and he die in the gunfight with the police. Ramullama finally kills Patwari, in front of the whole village.

== Cast ==
- Vijayashanti as Ramulamma
- Dasari Narayana Rao as Komranna
- Rami Reddy as Landlord Jagannayak Patwari
- Narra Venkateswara Rao as Ramaswamy
- Sakunthala as Ramaswamy's wife
- Saraswati Narra
- Ashok Kumar as Landlord's son
- Mukku Raju
- Suthivelu
- Chitti Babu
- Raghunatha Reddy
- Krishna as Krishna Mohan (cameo appearance)
- Ramki (cameo appearance)
- Shiva Parvathi

== Soundtrack ==
The music was composed by Vandemataram Srinivas. Srinivas gained Nandi Award and Filmfare South Award for his work. The songs (except two) were sung by him.

Track Listing
No.	Title	Lyrics	Singer(s)	Length
1.	"Osey Ramulamma"	C. Narayana Reddy	Vandemataram Srinivas, Swarnalatha	4:44
2.	"Ramasakkani Talli"	Suddala Ashok Teja	M. M. Keeravani, M. M. Srilekha	4:17
3.	"Addalori Buddayya"	Jayaveer	Mano	4:42
4.	"Inthi Ee Inti"	Suddala Ashok Teja	Vandemataram Srinivas, K. S. Chithra	5:41
5.	"Lachhulo Lachhanna"	Guda Anjaiah	Vandemataram Srinivas	5:28
6.	"Oo Chowdary Garu"	Gandavarapu Subba Rao	Vandemataram Srinivas	5:21
7.	"Ramulamma Oo Ramulamma"	Suddala Ashok Teja	Vandemataram Srinivas	6:00
8.	"Erupu Rangu"	Suddala Ashok Teja	K. S. Chithra	4:27
9.	"Pullala Mantivi"	Suddala Ashok Teja	Vandemataram Srinivas, S. Janaki	5:29
10.	"Ye Asurudu"	C. Narayana Reddy	Vandemataram Srinivas	5:02

== Reception ==
The film was reviewed by Zamin Ryot. A critic from Andhra Today wrote that "A big hit for the dashing, dare-devil heroine Vijayashanti after a long time is Ose Ramulamma".

== Awards ==
- 1997 – Vandemataram Srinivas won the Nandi Award for Best Music Director and the Filmfare Award for Best Music Director – Telugu.
- 1997 – Vijayashanti won the Nandi Award for Best Actress and the Filmfare Award for Best Actress – Telugu.
