= Dandakaranyam =

- poster
- Directed by: R. Narayana Murthy
- Produced by: R. Narayana Murthy
- Starring: R. Narayana Murthy; Gaddar
- Music by: R. Narayana Murthy
- Release date: 18 March 2016
- Running time: 160 min
- Country: India
- Language: Telugu

Dandakaranyam is a 2016 Indian Telugu action drama film directed and produced by R. Narayana Murthy under Sneha Chitra Pictures banner. The film features R. Narayana Murthy and Gaddar in the lead roles. The film was released on 18 March 2016.

The film is against the backdrop of exploitation of forested areas and the bauxite mining in Visakha Agency, Visakhapatnam District.

== Cast ==
- R. Narayana Murthy as Koteswara Rao
- Gaddar

== Release ==
Dandakaranyam was released on 18 March 2016 across Telangana and Andhra Pradesh.
