= Zamin Ryot =

Indian Telugu-language weekly newspaper

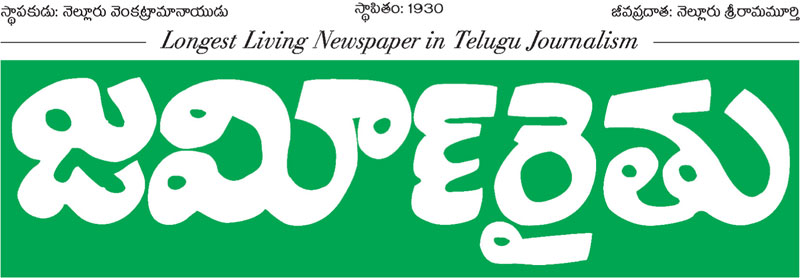
- Type: Weekly
- Founder: N. Venkatrama Naidu
- Founded: c. 1930
- Language: Telugu
- City: Nellore, Andhra Pradesh
- Country: India
- Website: zaminryot.com

Zamin Ryot is an Indian Telugu-language weekly newspaper published from Nellore. It was started by N. Venkatrama Naidu in c. 1930. It has been called the longest continuously running Telugu newspaper. It is one of the notable district newspapers in Telugu.

== Name ==
Zamin Ryot name is based on words 'Zamin' (transl. Land) and 'Ryot' (transl. Farmer). Zamin Ryot is a term used to refer to tenant farmers under the Zamindari system. The newspaper was founded to advocate for the cause of the ryots (peasants and tenant farmers) and against the feudal system.

== History ==
The publication was started by Nellore Venkatrama Naidu as Zamindari Ryot in c. 1930, (Note: Dr. G. Somasekhara notes the founding year as 1928 in his book Telugu Press and Indian Freedom Movement. But, the publication itself mentions the founding year as 1930 in its masthead.) before changing its name to Zamin Ryot. Originally meant to advocate against the feudal system in the area, it played an important role in reporting on the success of the Salt Satyagraha in Nellore district.

The British government searched house and office of Venkatrama Naidu and also of the editor Chundi Jagannatham for three days from 15 to 17 February 1941, officially on the basis that it spread anti-war propaganda. Such press restrictions during World War II led to the paper being suspended voluntarily from 1 September 1942. It resumed publication on 20 November 1942.

By 1993, it was identified as a pro-Congress publication. For example, during the reign of N. T. Rama Rao as chief minister, the publication often criticised and mocked him with "dripping sarcasm".

In 2019, editor Dolendra Prasad was attacked by MLA Kotamreddy Sridhar Reddy of Nellore Rural district in retaliation for a negative story on him. Prasad later expressed concerns that other attacks on journalists in Andhra Pradesh, inaction by the government on his attack, and a law passed by the cabinet allowing the government to sue media organisations for "distorted news" would lead to a chilling effect on journalism.
