= Jai Bolo Telangana =

- Movie Poster
- Directed by: N. Shankar
- Written by: Janardhana Maharshi
- Screenplay by: N. Shankar
- Story by: N. Shankar
- Produced by: N. Shankar
- Starring: Jagapathi Babu; Smriti Irani; Meera Nandan; Sandeep Singh
- Cinematography: T. Surendra Reddy
- Edited by: Kotagiri Venkateswara Rao
- Music by: Chakri
- Production company: Mahalakshmi Arts
- Release date: 4 February 2011
- Running time: 141 minutes
- Country: India
- Language: Telugu
- Box office: ₹6.5 crore distributors' share

Jai Bolo Telangana (transl. Hail Telangana!) is a 2011 Telugu-language historical drama film based on the Telangana Movement, produced & directed by N.Shankar on Mahalakshmi Arts banner and Cinematography by T. Surendra Reddy. Starring Jagapathi Babu, Smriti Irani, Meera Nandan, Sandeep Singh and music composed by Chakri. Beginning with the 1948 movement against the annexing of Seemandhra region with Hyderabad into state of Andhra Pradesh, and the circumstances that arose since then, the movie covered the significant events until the tumultuous days at Osmania University in 2009. With the police beating up many peaceful Telangana agitators and Telangana people committing suicide for the formation of a separate Telangana state- all real life incidents. It also shows how politicians from Seemandhra region have manipulated and bribed the media often.

The film has won five Andhra Pradesh state Nandi Awards, including the Sarojini Devi Award for a Film on National Integration, and was screened at the 6th South Asian Film Festival, held in Goa during September 2011.

The film was commercially successful at the box office.

== Plot ==
The film begins with Bandhagi Gopanna, a rebel whose life's meaning is the liberation of Telangana. Plus, his family dedicated and sacrificed their lives for it by the previous three generations. Gopanna's movement blazes from 4 sides when malevolent political forces assassinate him. Years roll by, and Jayamma, wife of Gopanna, runs an organization, Amma Odi, which feeds the poor students and unemployed youth. As well as she still has red parrots for Telangana, but her son Varshith feels it is futile to fall for an Andhra girl, Sahaja. Once, Varshith tours around ancestral villages where he spots people suffering from apathy and negligence. After soul-searching, he realizes the concrete way out is the formation of Telangana—Parallelly, KCR uproars the Telangana revolutionary movement, and he is apprehended. Hence, as a counterattack, a youth named Chari self-immolates when Varshith outrages hail to Telangana. From there, it conducts student agitation at Osmania University under the leadership of Varshith.

Anyhow, self-centered politicians plot to torpedo, which leads to severe destruction. Gradually, it became stronger by amalgamating officials, bureaucrats, advocates, and the police. Besides, the elders forcibly carry Sahaja to her hometown, spitting love birds by holding the regional barrier. Chanti, a vicious youth leader, conspires to knit with Sahaja by clutching her brother Sunil for his political gain. They seize Varshith & his supporters, who abscond. During this plight, Jayamma carries out a hunger strike, which is a fiery insurgence. This minute, the public collapsed the crown on wayward politicians. Day by day, Jayamma's health condition deteriorates and hauls her to the hospital. Being aware of it, Varshith proceeds, even Sahaja revokes the match and moves to Hyderabad. On the way, Varshith faces a police encounter, and Chanti stabs Sahaja. Despite that, they reach the camp and leave their breath, continuing Jayamma's mission. At last, it states that these leaders will change, and the Jayamma family will win. Finally, the movie ends with KCR's Maha Garjana Sabha and Parliament accepting the Telangana formation bill.

== Cast ==
- Jagapathi Babu as Bandhagi Gopanna
- Smriti Irani as Jayamma
- Meera Nandan as Sahaja
- Sandeep Singh as Varshith
- S. V Ranga Rao Jr as Chanti
- Meenakshi
- Nagineedu
- AVS
- Prudhvi Raj
- Janardhana Maharshi
- Siva Reddy
- Deshapati Srinivas
- Allam Narayana
- Mallepally Laxmaiah
- Nandini Sidda Reddy
- Gaddar
- Vimalakka
- K. Chandrashekar Rao
- Addanki Dayakar
- R. Vidyasagar Rao

== Production ==
The producers, who originally agreed to do the film, backed out at the eleventh hour, as there ‘was no commercial element’ in it. They said they cannot release the film in the Seemandhra region. I sold my properties and made the movie.

— N. Shankar on the movie, 2023

Meera Nandan initially rejected the film due to her tight schedule, but she later accepted the film after several months passed by.

== Soundtrack ==
The music was composed by music director Chakri. The song, "Garadi Chestundru" was written by K. Chandrashekar Rao.

No.	Title	Lyrics	Performer(s)	Length
1.	"Jai Bolo Telangana"	Ande Sri	Vandemataram Srinivas	5:15
2.	"Oka Puvvu Oka Navvu"	Nandini Sidda Reddy	Sri Krishna, Adarshini	5:54
3.	"Podustunna Poddumeeda"	Gaddar	Gaddar	5:51
4.	"Nijamena"	Suddala Ashok Teja	Chakri, Tina Kamal	5:47
5.	"Gaaradi Chestundru"	K. Chandrashekar Rao	Vasu	3:12
6.	"Ee Gaayam Ee Gaayam"	Goreti Venkanna	Chakri, Pavni Pandey	5:42

== Reception ==
Jeevi of Idlebrain.com wrote, "On a whole, Jai Bolo Telangana attempts at realistic portrayal of struggle and mindset of people in Telanagana". Radhika Rajamani rated the film 2/5 stars and wrote, "On the whole, the film is a straightforward depiction of the Telangana statehood issue and presents a uni-dimensional picture of proceedings".

== Awards ==
Nandi Awards

- Sarojini Devi Award for a Film on National Integration
- Best Director - N. Shankar
- Best Lyricist - Gaddar - "Podustunna Poddumeeda"
- Best Male Playback Singer - Gaddar - "Podustunna Poddumeeda"
- Best Male Dubbing Artist - R. C. M. Raju

== Legacy ==
The film is remembered as being one of the films that highlighted the Telangana struggle prior to Telangana statehood. The film is also notably for its inclusion of K. Chandrasekhar Rao as an actor and lyricist; he later became the first chief minister of Telangana. Smriti Irani is affectionately called Telangana Thalli every time she visits Telangana due to her role in the film.
