= Jamalapuram Temple =

Hindu temple in Telangana, India

Sri Venkateshwara Swamy Temple
- వెంకటేశ్వరస్వామి దేవాలయం
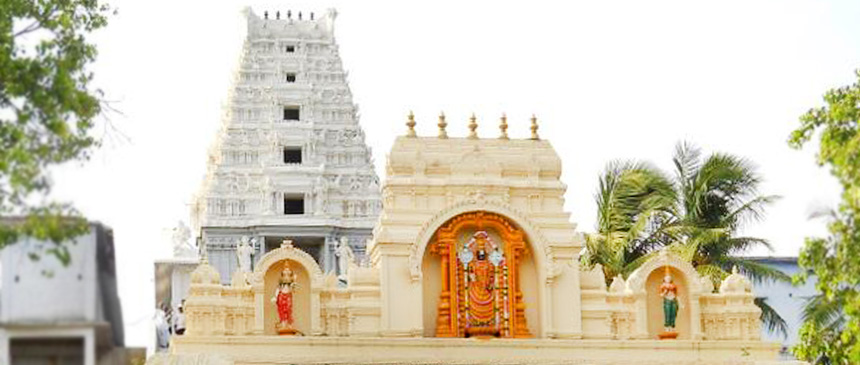
- Jamalapuram Temple

- Location within Telangana

Religion
- Affiliation: Hinduism
- District: Khammam district
- Deity: Venkateswara

Location
- Location: Jamalapuram
- State: Telangana
- Country: India
- Interactive map of Sri Venkateshwara Swamy Temple
- Coordinates: 16.8317°N 80.5198°E

Sri Venkateshwara Swamy Temple is located in Jamalapuram, near to Errupalem in Khammam district of Telangana, India.

The presiding deity in this temple is Lord Balaji and is said to be a swayambhu Lord, who self-manifested in this place. The legend has it that in ancient days Jabali Maharshi worshipped and did penance here at a place called Suchi Gutta and was said to have been blessed by Lord Venkateshwara.

The temple here seems to have been in existence since considerable antiquity. It was renovated by Sri Krishnadevaraya, the emperor of Vijayanagara Empire. It is also known as Telangana Chinna Tirupathi. The temple has sub-shrines for Padmavathi Ammavaru, Sri Alamelu Ammavaru, Lord Shiva, Lord Ganesh, Lord Ayyappa, and Lord Hanuman.
