= Nandini Sidda Reddy =

Indian poet, writer and social activist (born 1955)

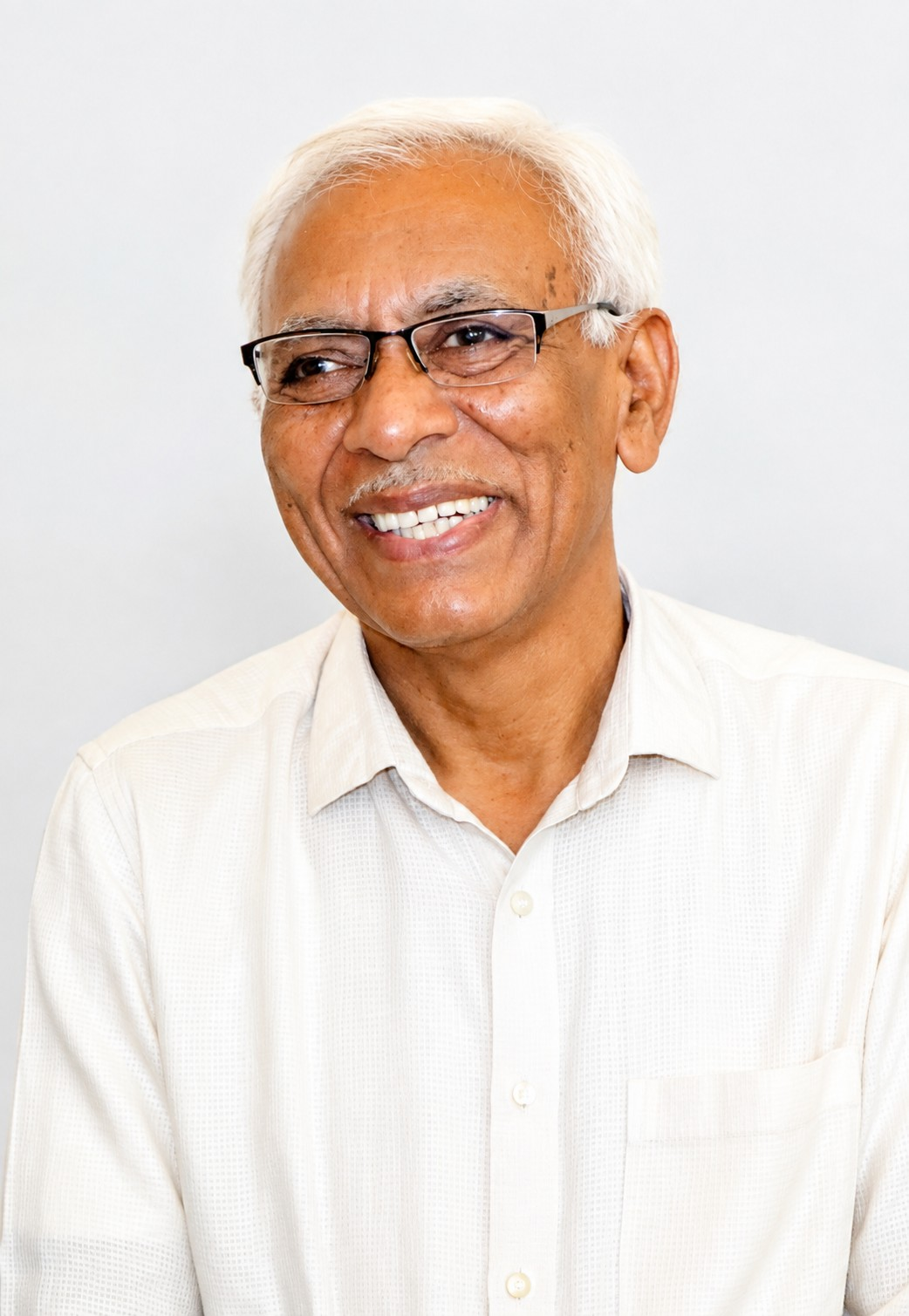
- Nandini Sidda Reddy at his residence Hyderabad on 20 August 2026
- Born: 12 June 1955 (age 71); Banda, Kondapak, Medak district, Telangana, India
- Occupations: Writer and social activist

Nandini Sidda Reddy (or Sidhareddy, Sidha Reddy; Telugu: నందిని సిధారెడ్డి; born 12 June 1955) is a teacher, writer, poet, songwriter and social activist from the state of Telangana, India. He is known for promoting Telugu culture. Several of his songs have been featured in Telugu language films. He was one of the leaders of the Telangana movement to make Telangana a separate state from Andhra Pradesh, which took place in 2014. He also served as the first Chairman of the Telangana Sahitya Akademi.

== Life ==
=== Education and teaching career ===
Nandini Sidda Reddy was born in 1955 in Bandaram village, Medak district, Telangana, India. His father, Narra Balasiddhareddy, was a communist who fought against the Razakars. After completing his M.A at Osmania University, Hyderabad, he did his MPhil degree on "The Sun in Modern Telugu Poetry" (1981) and then graduated with his Ph.D. on "Modern Poetry – Reality – Surrealism" in 1986. After teaching in Medak from 1984 to 1991, he worked as a Telugu lecturer at Siddipet Government Degree College and retired in 2012.

=== Author and poet ===
Nandini Sidda Reddy began to write stories and poetry in his student days. Later he ran an organization called the Navasahiti and Medak Study Circle and a small magazine called Rose. He founded the Manjeera Writers' Association and organized several literary events, edited the Manjeera bulletin and published seven collections of poetry. He edited a magazine called Soi. In 2001, he was the founding president of the Telangana Writers' Forum.

In August 1997, written in just one hour, Siddhareddy's poem on the need for a special Telangana movement became known as "Nageti salalo na Telangana". In this poem, Sidhareddy describes the whole culture of Telangana. The same poem was used as a song in the movie Poru Telangana. The song also received a Nandi Award. Sidhareddy wrote the poem on Telangana long before Ande Sri's Jaya Jaya He Telangana and Goreti Venkanna's Ganama Telanganama. There are ten verses in this poem, which is sung all over Telangana as a Bathukamma song.

Nandini Sidda Reddy appeared in the 2011 Telugu historical drama film Jai Bolo Telangana, which featured his song Oka Puvvu Oka Navvu rendered by Sri Krishna, Adarshini. In 2016 he was chosen for the Potti Sreeramulu Telugu University’s annual Vishista Puraskaram award. This was the first time the award had gone to someone outside Hyderabad. It recognized Reddy's role in the separate Telangana movement.

=== Telangana official roles ===
In 2014 Nandini Sidha Reddy was a member of a committee to review Telugu language textbooks. A key issue was whether they should be in the spoken Telangana dialect or the traditional "Sanskritised" Telugu. In 2015 he was appointed to a Telangana state government committee on the syllabus for recruitment exams. The old syllabus drafted by the Andhra Pradesh Public Service Commission in the united Andhra Pradesh would be replaced by a "Telangana-centric new syllabus".

Nandini Sidda Reddy was appointed as the first Chairman of the Telangana Sahitya Akademi formed on 2 May 2017. The academy was established to ensure regular research, analysis, publishing and propagation of the Telugu language. In August 2017 he headed a panel to select an eminent personality eligible for Kaloji Narayana Rao award. His academy was in charge of the World Telugu Conference held in Hyderabad from 15 to 19 December 2017. As of 2020 he was still Chairman of Telangana Cultural Academy.

== Works ==
=== Essays ===
- Modern Telugu Poetry - Reality - Surrealism (Theory)
- Adhunika Telugu Kavithvam Vasthavikatha - Adhivasthavika - Theoretical Essay as part of PhD - 1986
- Iguram - Essays on Telangana Language and culture - 2007
- Kula Vruthula - Telangana Sahityam – Essay - 2008
- Avarthanam - Essays on Telangana Literature - 2011

=== Poetry ===
- Diviti – Mini Collection of Poems with two other poets - 1974
- Bhoomi Swapnam - Collection of Poems - 1987
- Sambhashana - Collection of Poems - 1991
- Pranahitha - Collection of Poems - 1996
- Oka Badha gadhu - Collection of Poems - 2001
- Nadi Puttuvadi - Collection of Poems – 2007
- Ikkadi ChetlaGaali - Collection of Poems – 2014

=== Miscellaneous ===
- A Pair of Hands (1994)
- Dreams and Life (2000)

=== Stories ===
- Chitra Kannu ( Collection of Stories)
- Hrudhayam – Third Prize - Sankranthi Story Competition, Andhra Sachitra Vara Patrika - 1978
- Aata – Special prize - Deepawali Story Competition, Jyothi masa Patrika - 1978

=== Songs ===
- Nageti salallo na Telangana- 17 August 1997
- Joharulu Joharulu.. Amarulaku Johar, Veerulaku Johar' - September 1977
- Telangana Paata - October 1997
- Telangana Matti - January 2000
- Telangana Baasha - February 2004
- Oka Puvvu Oka Navvu - September 2010
- Pudamiki Panduga Puvvula Jatara - August 2011
- Nageti Sallalla Naa Telangana (Poru Telangana- 2011)
- Nageti Chalalla - 23 Songs - 2012
- Idi Charitra - 2013 - Song on leaders who fought for Telangana Armed Struggle
- Chelia Chelia Separation Dream ( 2 Countries- 2017)

=== Filmography ===
- Song Nageti salallo na Telangana – Film Veera Telangana (Nandi Award: Best lyric writer for 2010)
- Song Oka Puvvu Oka Navvu – Film Jai Bolo Telangana (2011)
- Song Idi Charitra – Film Bandook (2013)
- Song Pudamiki Panduga Puvvula Jatara – Film Kolimi (2015)
- Song Cheliya Cheliya Vidipoke Kalala – Film Two Countries (2017)

== Awards ==
- 1986 Free Verse Front Award for Bhoomiswapnam poetry collection
- Indore Bharathi Vari Dasharathi Award for Bhoomiswapnam poetry collection in 1988
- Telugu University Award for Pranahita Poetry Collection in 2001
- Vishwakalapeetham Vari Snehanidhi Best Poetry Award for a collection of sad poems in 2009
- Nandi Award for Best Songwriter for the song 'Nageti Salallo Na Telangana' in 2010
- Distinguished Award in Literature from Telugu University in 2016
