= Kulpakji =

Śvetāmbara Jain temple in Telangana, India

Kulpakji Tirtha
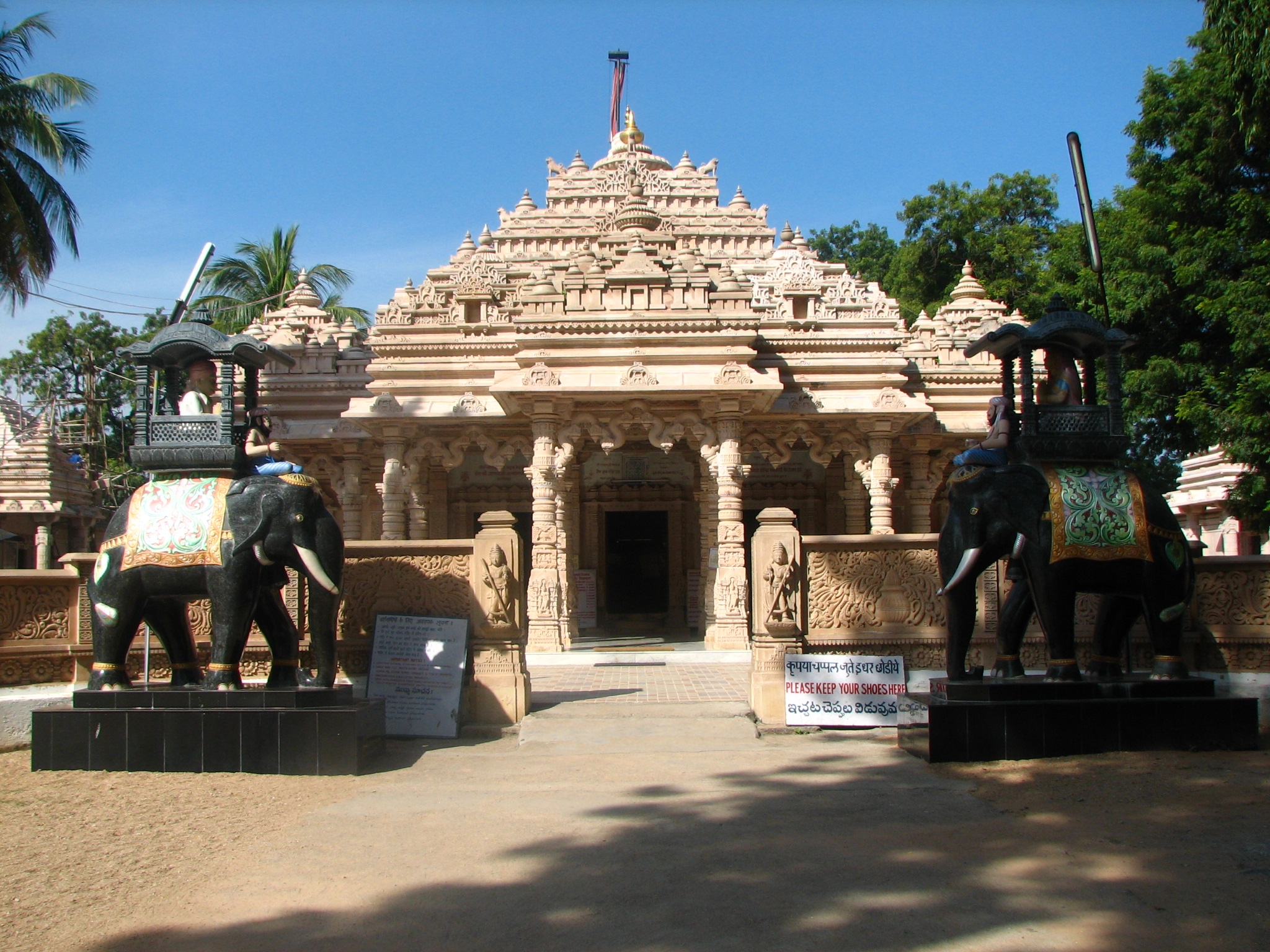
- Kulpakji

- Location in Telangana

Religion
- Affiliation: Jainism
- Sect: Śvetāmbara
- Deity: Rishabhanatha
- Festival: Mahavir Jayanti

Location
- Location: Kolanupaka, Aler City, Yadadri, Telangana, India
- Coordinates: 17.6997°N 79.0375°E

Architecture
- Established: 1st century B.C.- 1st century C.E.

Kulpakji, also known as Kolanupaka Temple is a 2,000-year-old Śvetāmbara Jain temple in the village of Kolanupaka in Aler City, Yadadri Bhuvanagiri district, Telangana, India. The temple houses three deities: one each of Lord Rishabhanatha, Lord Neminatha, and Lord Mahavira. The image of Lord Mahavir, carved of a green stone has been historically famous as "Manikyaswami" and Jivantasvami. The temple is about 80 km from Hyderabad on the Hyderabad-Warangal Highway NH 163.

== History ==
Kolanupaka Temple was established in the 9th century. Kalchuri ruler Shankaragana had donated 12 villages to support the temple. A number of Jain antiquities have been discovered in Kulpakji. A grant mentioning a gift to a basadi during the rile of Sankaragana (9th century) has been found at Akunur. Kolanupaka flourished as a Jain center during the Rashtrakutas period.

In Vividha Tirtha Kalpa (14th century) by Jinaprabhasuri, the sections Kulyapak Rishabhadeva Stuti and Kollapakamanikyadeva Tirthakalpa. He mentions that according to legends, the Manikyasami image was originally worshipped by Mandodari, the wife of Ravana. It was brought here by the ruler Sankar of Kalyana.

Over 20 Jain inscriptions have been found at Kulpak. A manastambha with an inscription of 1125 AD has been found mentioning ‘Jaina basadi’ and Jain teachers of Meshapashana Gachcha of Kanurgana. Inscriptions suggest that the Kulpak was a major center of Kanur Gana of Mula Sangh. A 12th-century inscription found in the temple mentions Meghachadra Siddhantadeva, who entered sallekhana. There is a 151-line Kannada inscription issued by Someshvara III of Western Chalukya Empire in 1125 AD.

According to Śvetāmbara legends, the main temple is said to have been built by Bharat Chakravartin. Jainism was prevalent in Andhra Pradesh before the 4th century, and Kolanupaka was one of the prominent centers of Jainism from early times. The temple was recently renovated by employing more than 150 artisans from Rajasthan and Gujarat.

In April 2022, during renovation in Someshwara Temple near Kulpakji, two 4 by 1.4 feet (1.22 by 0.43 m) sculptures of 'Maha Jaina Pada' (foot) of Jain Tirthankara were discovered.

== The Temple ==
Kulpakji is an important Jain pilgrimage center of South India. The interior of the temple is made by red sandstone and white marble. Lord Rishabha, popularly called Adinath Bhagvan, was the first Tirthankar in Jainism. It is believed that the original deilty of Lord Adinath, known locally as Manikya Deva, has made Kolanupaka its abode.

There are eight deities of the other Tirthankars on both the sides of the main temple. The statue of Lord Mahaveer is 130 centimetres (51 in) tall and is said to be made of a single piece of jade. deities of Lord Simandar Swami and Mata Padmavati are installed on either side of the main temple. The temple also houses deities of Shantinatha, Chandraprabha, Abhinandananatha, Padmāvatī and Bhomyaji.

A dharamshala is built around the temple.

Also, the Someshwara Temple is very famous, which was established by Chalukya's about 800 years back. Kolanu means a Lake and Paka means a Hut. There used to be lots of lakes and huts and this caused to get this name. Kolanupaka is said to be known by different names in the past, Bimbavatipuram, Kottiyapaka, Kollihaka, Kollipaka and Kolanpak. Many statues were found while constructing the school and library in the village. All the statues were moved and placed in the Someshwara Temple's museum by Somalingam Kallem, a government official.

== Renovation ==
The temple was recently renovated by employing more than 150 artisans from Rajasthan and Gujarat supervised by Sompuras. The old garbhagrah was preserved and a complete new temple was created surrounding the existing tower.

== Gallery ==
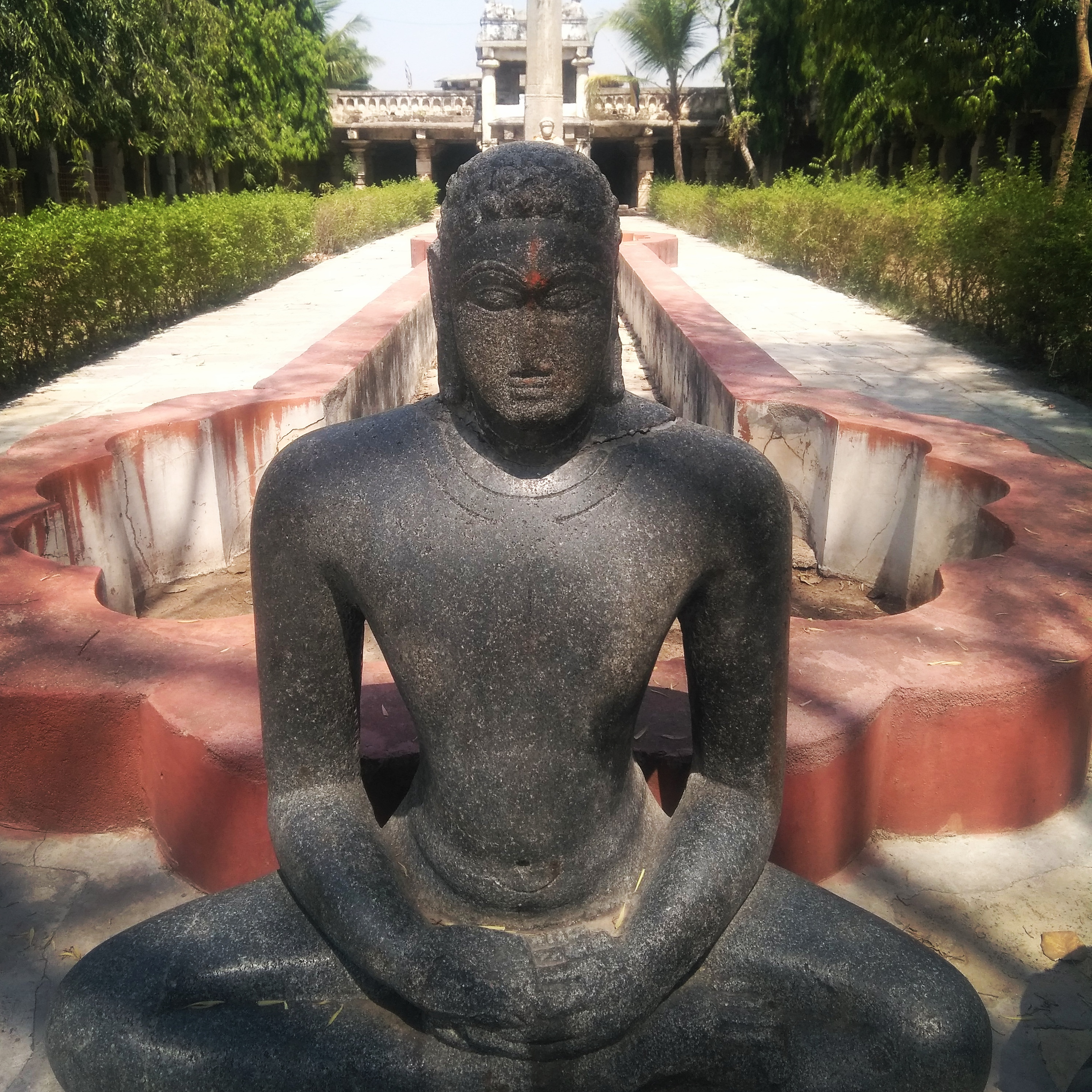
Mahavira deity

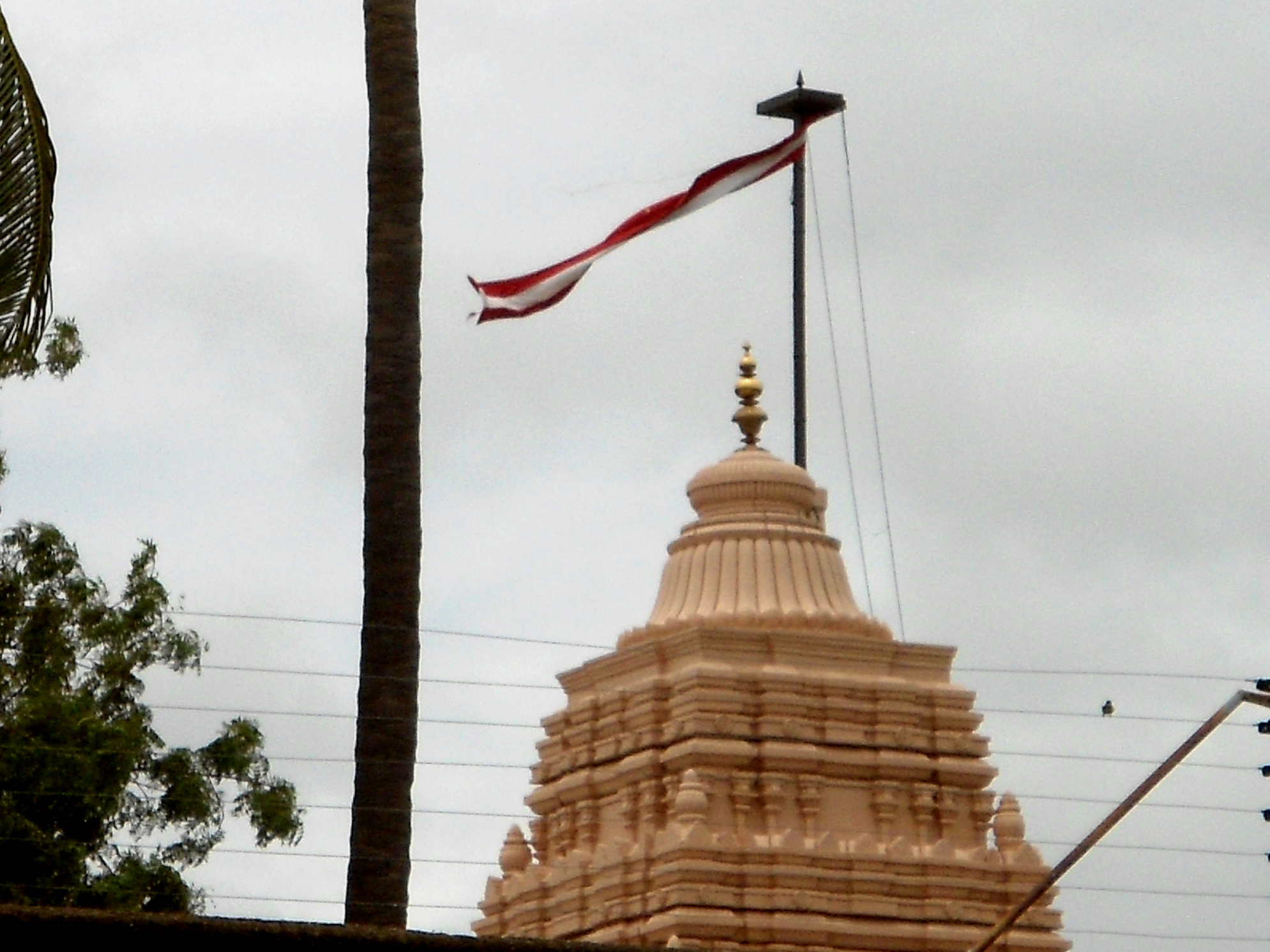
Kolanupaka Temple (Kulpakji Temple) Gopuram

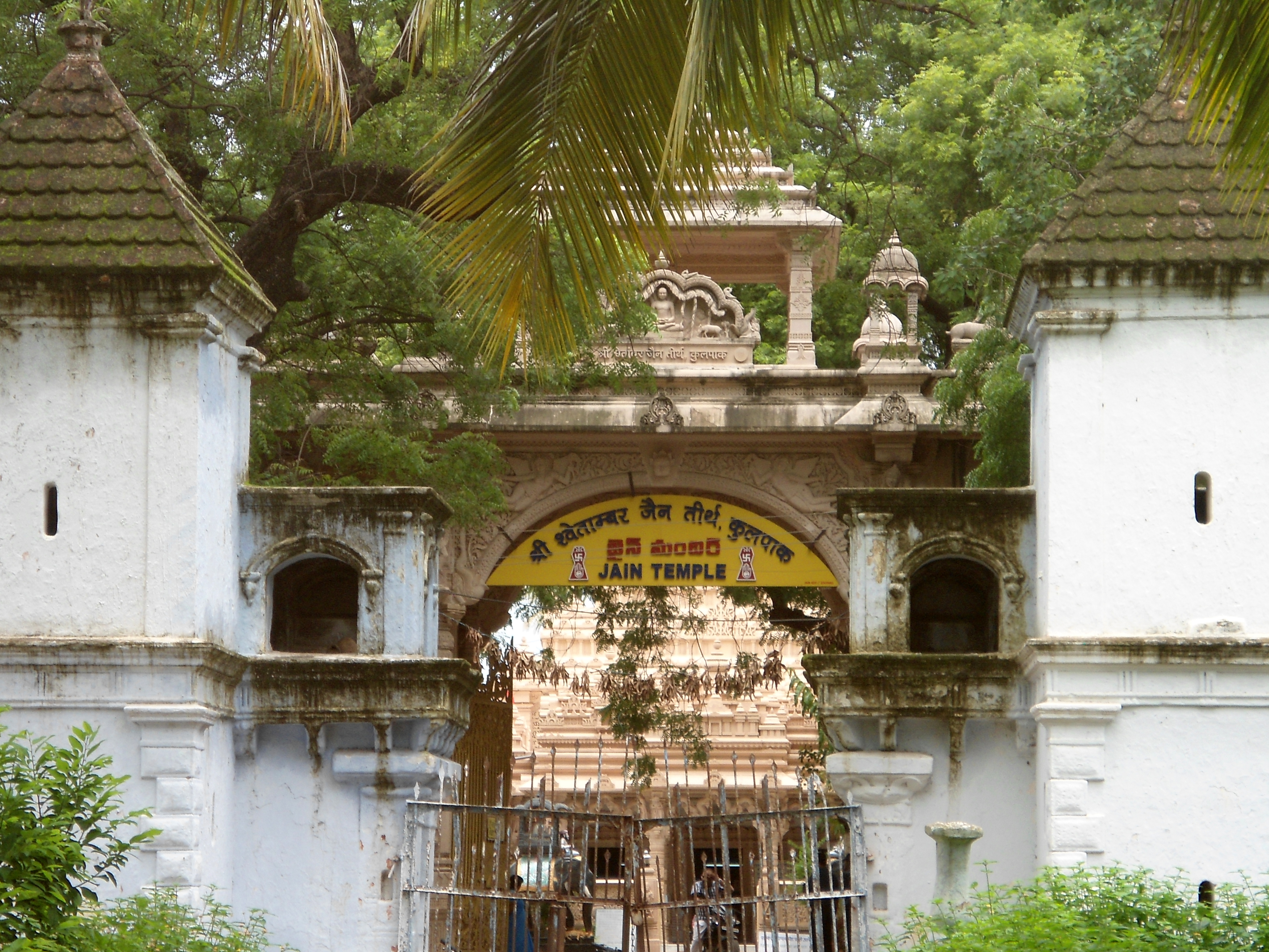
Kolanupaka Temple (Kulpakji Temple) entrance

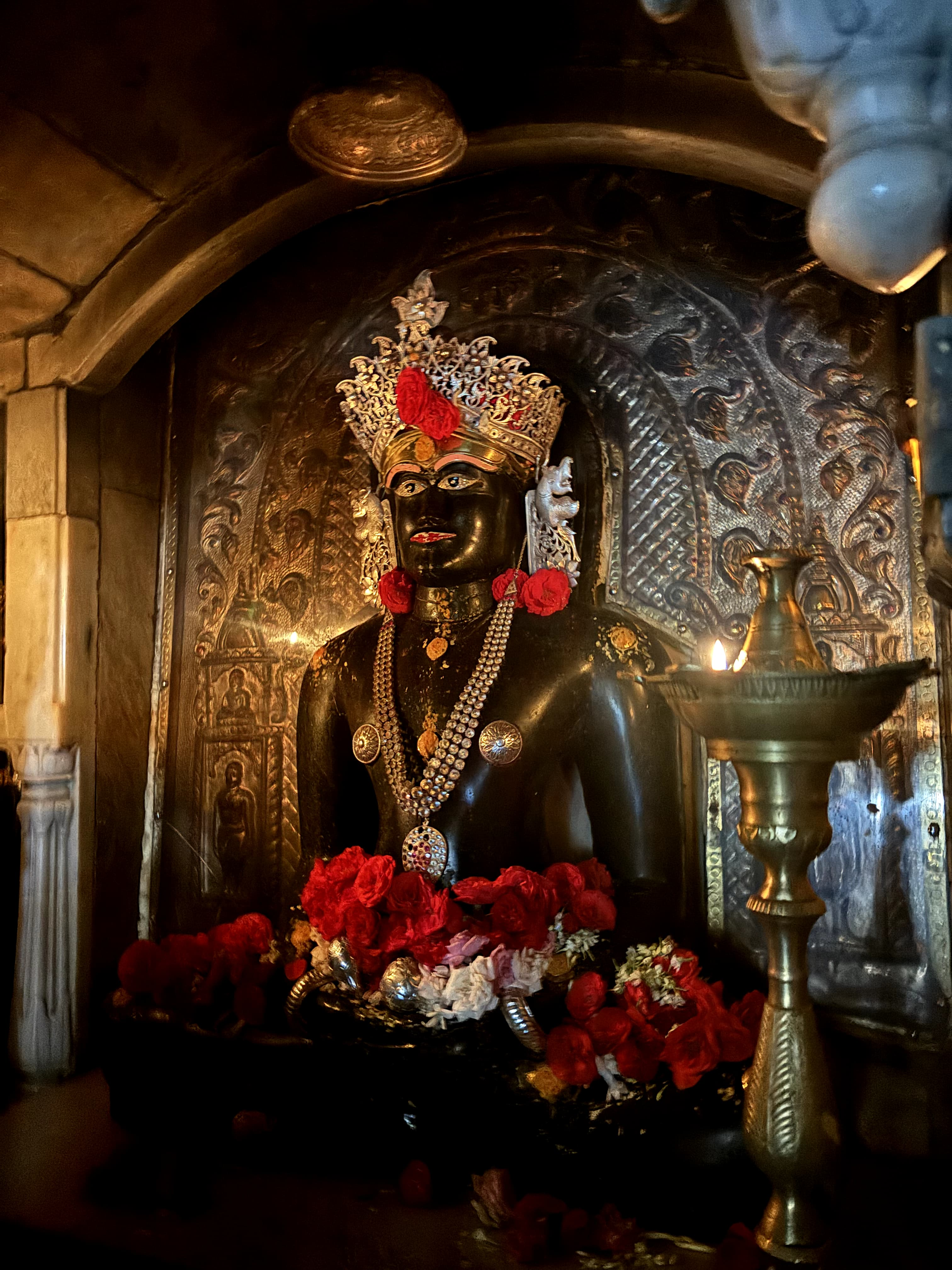
Main Idol of Rishabhadeva at Kulpak Temple

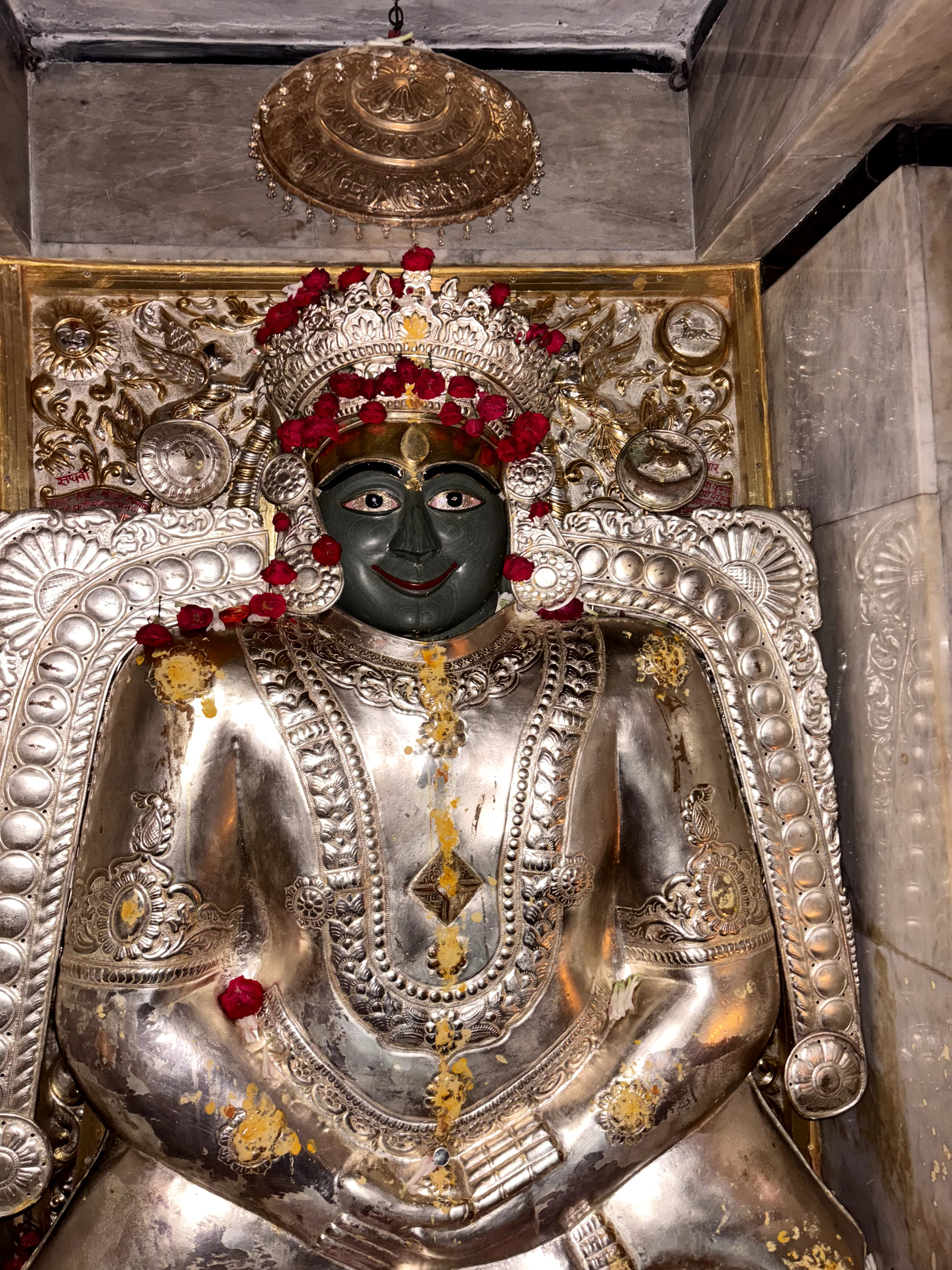
Jade idol of Mahavira
