= Bathukamma =

Flower festival in India

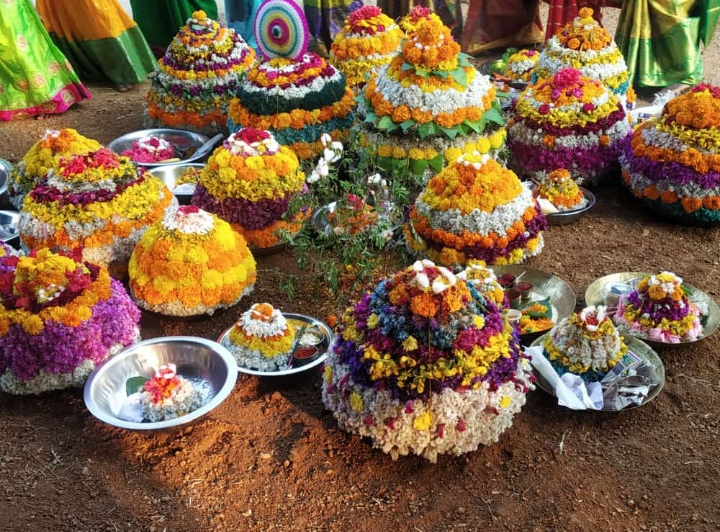
- Bathukamma floral arrangement
- Official name: Bathukamma
- Observed by: Hindus worldwide
- Type: Floral Festival of Goddess Gauri ( Parvati )
- Significance: Bathukamma is a floral festival celebrated primarily by Hindu women in Telangana and parts of Andhra Pradesh to honor Goddess Gauri and highlight the inherent relationship between earth, water, and human beings.
- Celebrations: Women wear traditional clothing and gather in local community spaces. They place their flower arrangements in the center and move in a circle around them, clapping rhythmically and singing regional folk songs.
- Begins: Mahalaya Amavasya (Pitru Amavasya, at the end of the Bhadrapada month).
- Ends: Durga Ashtami (the eighth day of the Ashwayuja month).
- Date: 11 October 2026-18 October 2026
- Duration: 9 days
- Frequency: Annual
- Related to: Festivals in India Culture of Telangana Culture of Andhra Pradesh

Bathukamma is a flower-festival celebrated by Telugu Hindu women to worship Goddess Gauramma in Telangana and some parts of Andhra Pradesh. Every year this festival is celebrated as per the Sathavahana calendar for nine days starting on Pitru Amavasya, which usually coincides with the months September–October of the Gregorian calendar. Bathukamma is celebrated for nine days and corresponds to the festivals of Sharad Navratri and Durga Puja. It starts on the day of Mahalaya Amavasya and the 9-day festivities culminate on "Saddula Bathukamma" or "Pedda Bathukamma." Bathukamma is followed by Boddemma, which is a 7-day festival. The Boddemma festival that marks the ending of Varsha Ruthu whereas Bathukamma marks the beginning of Sarad or Sharath Ruthu

In Telugu, ‘Bathukamma' means ‘Mother Goddess come Alive’. Bathukamma is a beautiful flower stack, arranged with different unique seasonal flowers most of them with medicinal values, in seven concentric layers in the shape of a temple gopuram. It is usually brothers who bring flowers to their mother and sisters to arrange bathukamma.

Historically, Bathukamma meant "the festival of life". It also marks the celebration of femininity in the Deccan region, during which women of Telangana dress up in traditional saris, with jewels and other accessories. Teenage Girls wear Langa-Oni/Half-Sarees/Lehenga Choli with jewels in order to bring out the traditional grace of the attire.

9 Nights of Bathukamma

- Day 1: Engili pula Bathukamma
- Day 2: Atukula Bathukamma
- Day 3: Muddapappu Bathukamma
- Day 4: Nanabiyyam Bathukamma
- Day 5: Atla Bathukamma
- Day 6: Aligina Bathukamma
- Day 7: Vepakayala Bathukamma
- Day 8: Vennela muddala Bathukamma
- Day 9: Saddhula Bathukamma

Bathukamma represents cultural spirit of Telangana. It, along with the festivals of Bonalu, Sammakka Saralamma Jatara gained increased significance during the Telangana movement as a marker of the region's separate cultural identity from Andhra Pradesh, and its celebration has become much more prominent with the secession of Telangana from Andhra Pradesh in 2014.

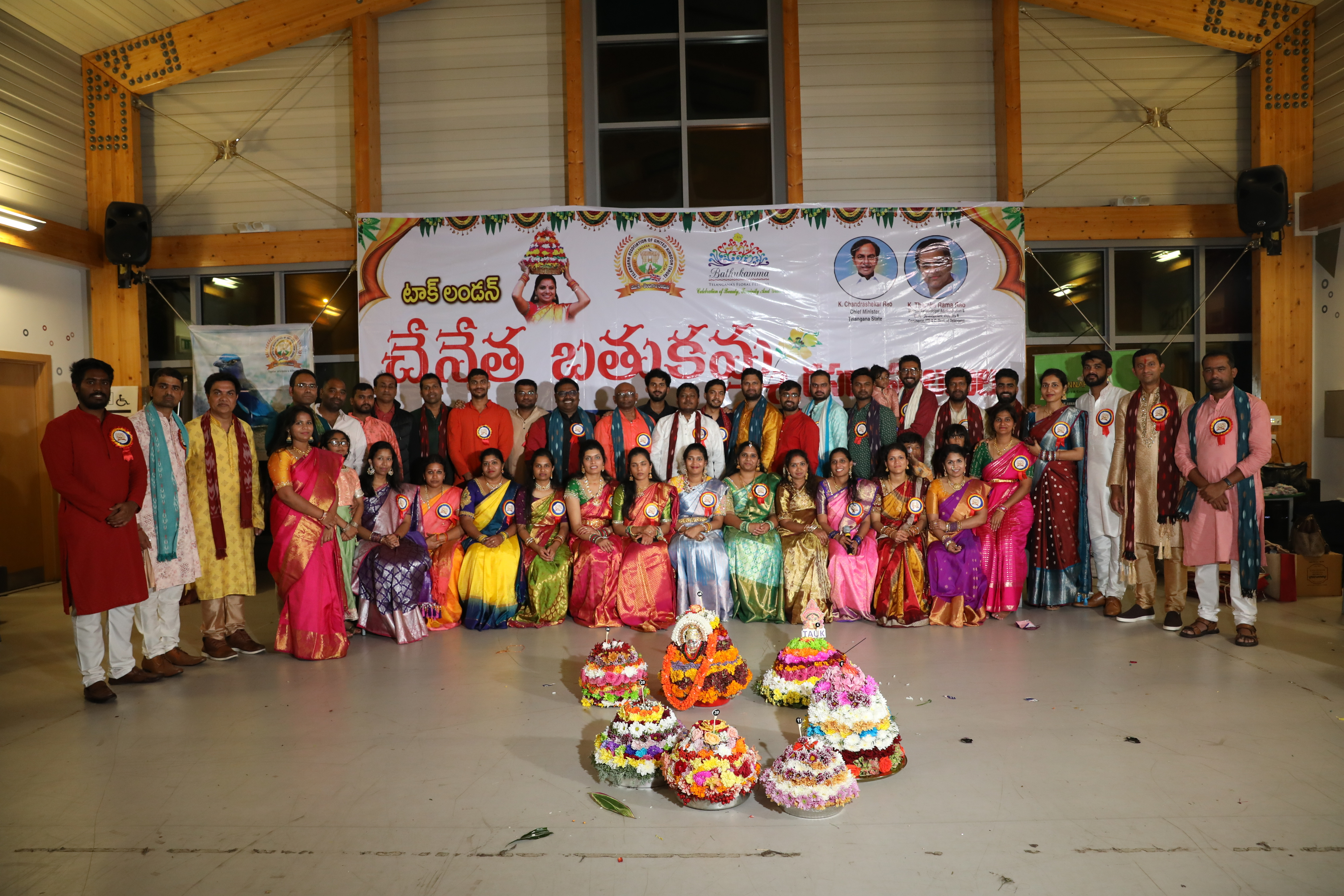
Cheneta Bathukamma Celebrations 2025 were held in London under Telangana Association of United Kingdom.

== History ==
The Chalukyas of Vemulavada, based in present-day Vemulawada, were feudatories of the Rashtrakuta Empire. During the conflicts between the Chola kings and the Rashtrakutas, these Chalukyas supported their Rashtrakuta overlords. In 973 CE, Tailapa II, a Chalukya feudatory, defeated Karka II, the last Rashtrakuta king, and established the independent Kalyani Chalukya kingdom. After Tailapa II died in 997 CE, his son Satyashraya ascended the throne. The Sri Raja Rajeshwara Temple, located in the former kingdom of Vemulavada (in the modern Rajanna Sircilla district), was a prominent religious center. According to local history, the Chola king Parantaka II (also known as Parantaka Sundara Chola) faced difficulties while defending his kingdom against a Rashtrakuta invasion. Believing that the presiding deity, Rajarajeshwara, would protect those in trouble, Parantaka became a devotee. As a mark of his devotion, he named his son Raja Raja, a claim reportedly supported by the Arikesari epigraphs. Raja Raja Chola I ruled from 985 to 1014 CE. His son, Rajendra Chola I, serving as the chief of the army, launched a successful attack against Satyashraya, the Western Chalukya king. As a symbol of his victory, regional legends suggest that he damaged the Sri Raja Rajeswara temple and took its massive (Bruhat) Shivalinga to his father as a gift. In 1006 CE, Raja Raja Chola began constructing a new temple to house this giant Shivalinga, officially installing it in the Brihadisvara Temple in 1010 CE. Furthermore, certain Tamil epigraphs reportedly state that the Brihadisvara temple was funded using the wealth looted during the attacks on the Vemulavada Chalukya kingdom.

Today, locals point out striking similarities between the Shivalinga in the Bhimeshvara Temple of Vemulavada and the one housed in the Brihadisvara Temple of Thanjavur. The word "Bathukamma" itself is believed to be derived from the name "Bruhadamma". According to regional folklore, taking the sacred Shivalinga away from Vemulavada to Thanjavur deeply saddened the local population. By removing Lord Shiva, his consort, Goddess Parvati (also known locally as Bruhadamma), was left alone and grieving in the temple. To console the separated Goddess and express their shared sorrow over the actions of the Cholas, the people of the region began a unique tradition that eventually evolved into the Bathukamma festival.

== Other explanations ==
Bathukamma means ‘Oh Mother, Please come back to life’ and it is asking for Goddess Sati to return. Legend has it that Sati reincarnated as Goddess Parvati and therefore the festival is also dedicated to Goddess Parvati. Mahisasura was a buffalo demon.He prayed to Brahma that he should have knowledge of all mantras.The sages could not chant the hymns to appease the gods and the gods also lost most of their strength.It became like a drought, and people started drinking their own blood.The gods put all their strength into creating Goddess Durga.According to one legend, she cried for nine days on seeing the plight of the people.On the tenth day Vijayadashami she kills Mahisasura.Bathukamma is celebrated to commemorate the nine days of Durga which she spent crying

There are many myths behind this festival. According to the popular legend, Goddess Durga killed a demon named Mahishasura after a fierce fight that lasted for 9 days. After this act, she went to sleep on the 'Ashwayuja Padyami' day, due to fatigue. The devotees prayed to her to wake up, and she woke up on the tenth day which is now celebrated as Vijaya Dashami or Dasara.

The other is Bathukamma, the daughter of the Chola King Dharmangada and Satyavati. The king and queen lost their 100 sons on the battlefield and prayed to Goddess Lakshmi to be born in their house, as their child. Goddess Lakshmi heard their sincere prayers and chose to help them.She asked Satyavati to pluck fruits from a tree surrounded by snakes.Satyavati plucked many fruits, but while climbing down they all fell, except for one. When Lakshmi was born in the royal palace, all the sages came to bless her and blessed her with immortality "Bathukamma or Live Forever". Since then, young girls in Telangana have celebrated the Bathukamma festival. The purpose of this festival is to pray to the Goddess in the belief that the young girls would get husbands as per their wish, to teach the young girls how to take care of their in-laws, their husbands, be great women who respect elders, love people around them, be guides to their younger ones. Further, married women celebrate the festival to pray to the Goddess for the good health and prosperity of their families.

Goddess Gowri, according to one legend, is a lover of flowers. Flowers are arranged on a square wooden plank or a square bamboo frame with the size of frames tapering off to form a pinnacle on top. They resemble the shape of a temple tower (Gopura). Gauramma (a symbolic idol of Gowri made of turmeric) is placed on top of the flowers. This little floral mountain is worshipped as Goddess Bathukamma.

This festival is celebrated with joy and gaiety. During these celebrations, there are dance performances, music, dramas and a variety of entertainment as thousands of tourists and locals too, flock to witness the happenings. 'Jataras' are also held during this month long celebrations.

== Preparation ==
Men in the house gather Bathukamma flowers from the wild plains like Celosia, Senna, Marigold, Chrysanthemum, Indian Lotus, Cucurbita leaves & flowers, Cucumis Sativus leaves & flowers, Memecylon edule, Tridax procumbens, Trachyspermum ammi, Katla, Teku Flowers, etc., which bloom in this season in various colors all across the plains of the region.

Preparing a Bathukamma is a folk art. Women start preparing Bathukamma from the afternoon. They cut the flowers leaving the little length base, some dip Gunugu (Celosia) flowers in various vibrant colours, some scented and arrange them on a wide plate called Thambalam.

The songs are to invoke the blessings of various goddesses.

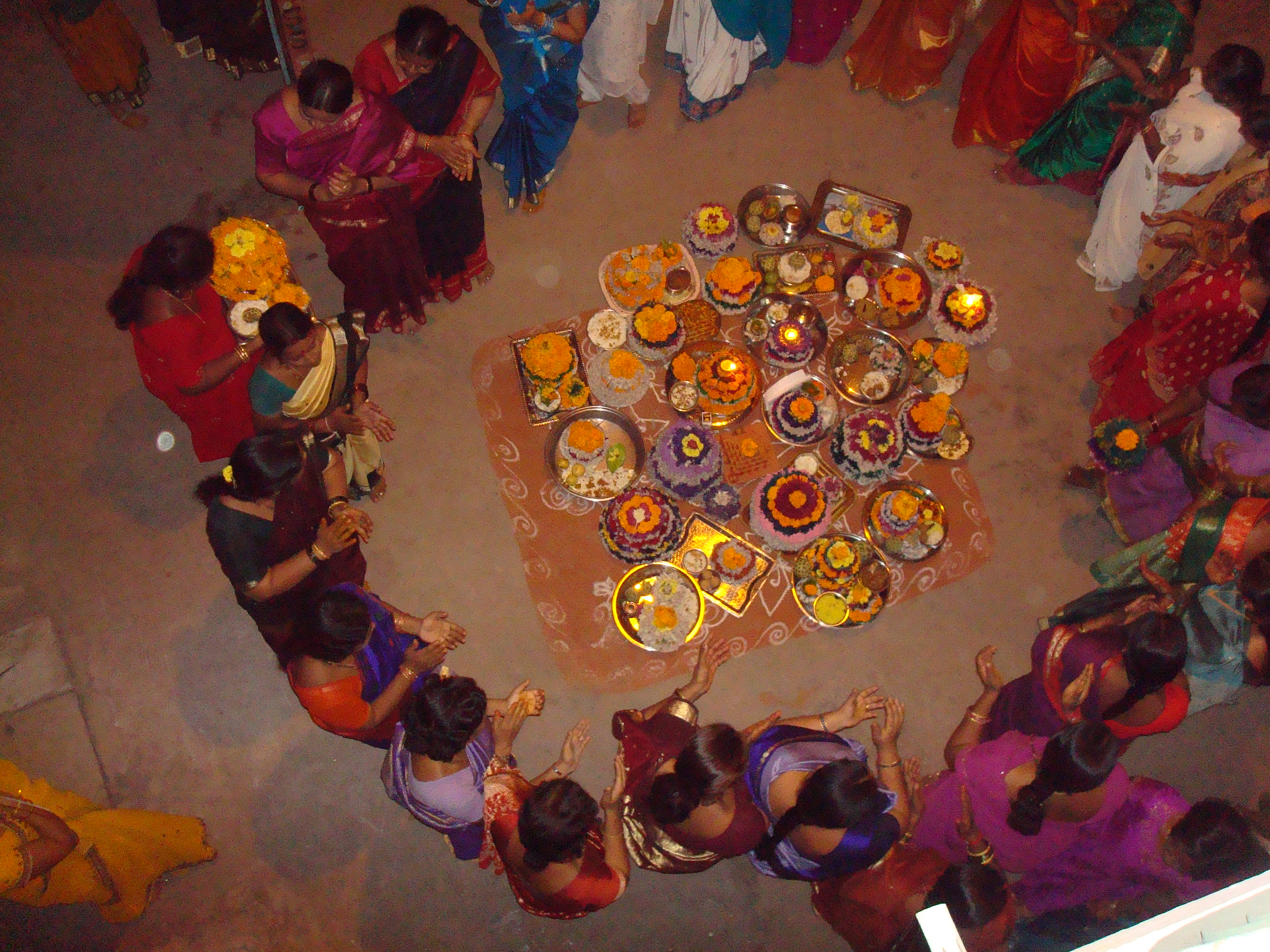
Telangana Women Celebrating Bathukamma

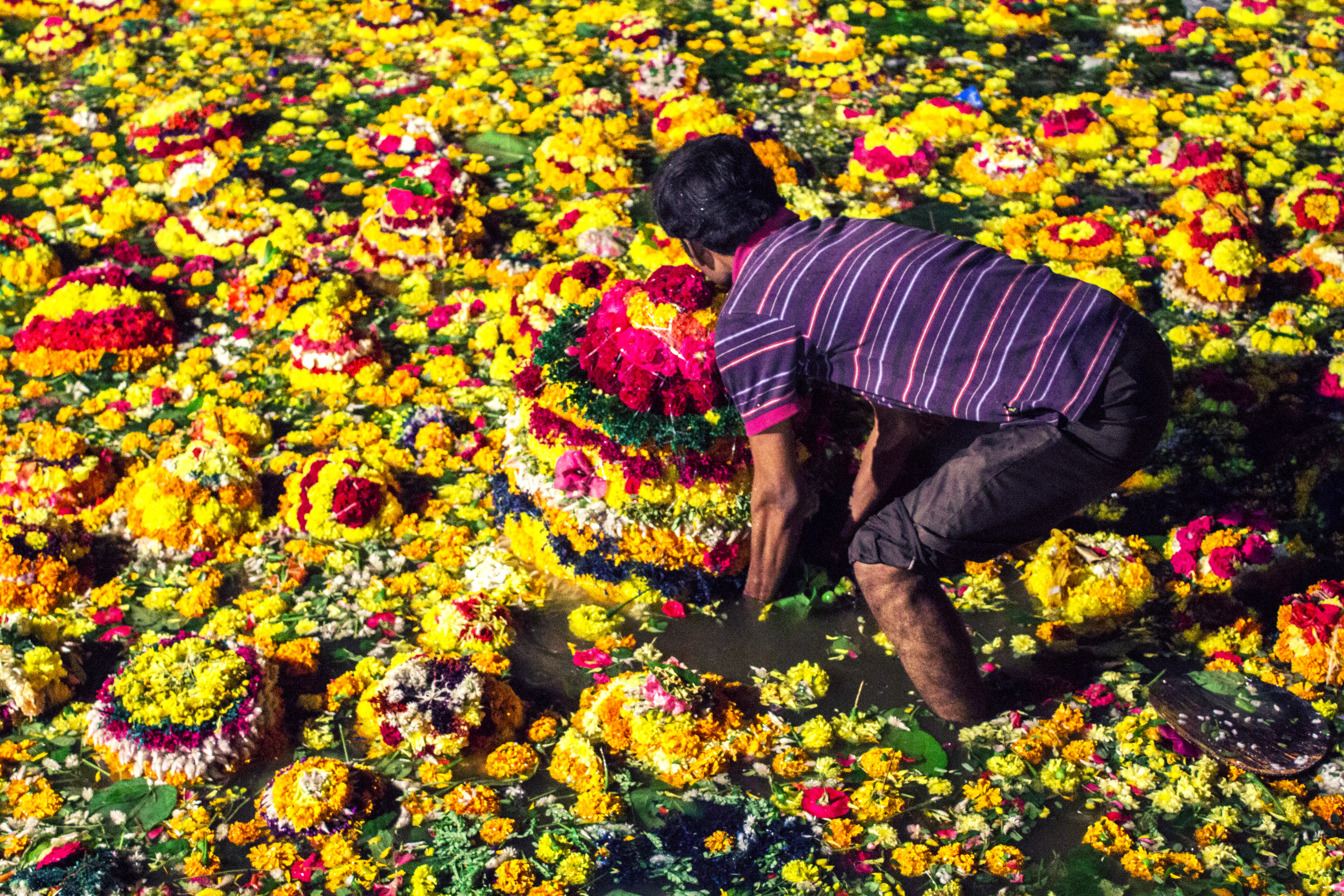
Bathukamma immersion in Hyderabad

Each day has a name mainly signifying the type of "naivedyam" (food offering) offered. Most of the naivedyam offered are very simple to prepare, and usually young children or young girls are mainly involved in the preparation of the offerings for the first eight days of the festival. The last day, called saddula Bathukamma is when all the women take part in the preparation. Following is the list of names for each day and the naivedyam offered on that day.

- Engili pula Bathukamma- The first day of the festival falls on Mahalaya Amavasya, also known as Pethara Amavasya in Telangana region.

Food offering/Naivedyam: Nuvvulu (Sesame seeds) with biyyampindi (rice flour) or nookalu (coarsely ground wet rice).

- Atkula Bathukamma: The second day is called Atkula bathukamma, falls on the Padyami (first day) of Ashwayuja masam.

Food offering/Naivedyam: Sappidi pappu (Bland boiled lentils), bellam (jaggery), and atkulu (flattened parboiled rice)

- Muddapappu Bathukamma: The third day of Bathukamma falls on Vidiya/second day of Ashwayuja masam.

Food offering/Naivedyam: muddapappu (softened boiled lentils), milk and bellam (jaggery)

- Nanabiyyam Bathukamma: The fourth day falls on thidiya/third day of Ashwayuja masam.

Food offering/Naivedyam: nananesina biyyam (wet rice), milk, and bellam (jaggery)

- Atla Bathukamma: The fifth day falls on the chaturthi/fourth day of Ashwayuja masam.

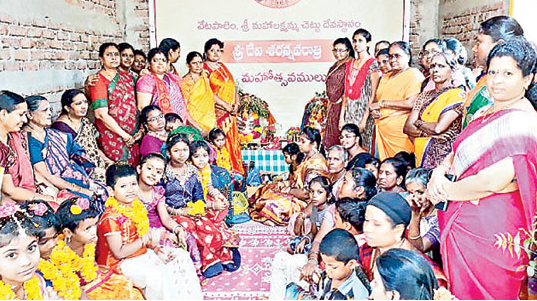
Women celebrating Batukamma in Prakasam District of Andhra Pradesh

Food offering/Naivedyam: uppidi pindi atlu (pan cakes made from wheatlets), or Dosa

- Aligina Bathukamma: The sixth day falls on the panchami/fifth day of Ashwayuja masam.

No food offering is made.

- Vepakayala Bathukamma: The seventh day falls on the shashti/sixth day of Ashwayuja masam.

Food offering/Naivedyam: rice flour shaped into the fruits of neem tree is deepfried.

- Vennamuddala Bathukamma: The eight day falls on sapthami/seventh day of Ashwayuja masam.

Food offering/Naivedyam: nuvvulu (sesame), Venna (Butter) or ghee (clarified butter), and bellam (jaggery)

- Saddula Bathukamma: The ninth day of bathukamma is celebrated on ashtami/eight day of Ashwayuja masam, and coincides with Durgashtami.

Food offering/Naivedyam: Five types of cooked rice dishes: perugannam saddi (curd rice), chinthapandu pulihora saddi (tamarind rice), nimmakaya saddi (lemon rice), kobbara saddi (coconut rice) and nuvvula saddi (sesame rice)

=== Saddula Bathukamma ===
This festival is celebrated for nine days and concludes on Durgashtami. The last day of the festival is called Saddula Bathukamma. On this day, immersion of Bathukamma (Bathukamma Visarjan) in water bodies is customary along with drum beats throughout Telangana. Gauramma (a symbolic idol of Goddess Parvati made of turmeric) is taken back from Bathukamma before immersion, with married women applying paste on their Mangala sutra that marks the solemnization of their marriage along with the protection of their husbands.

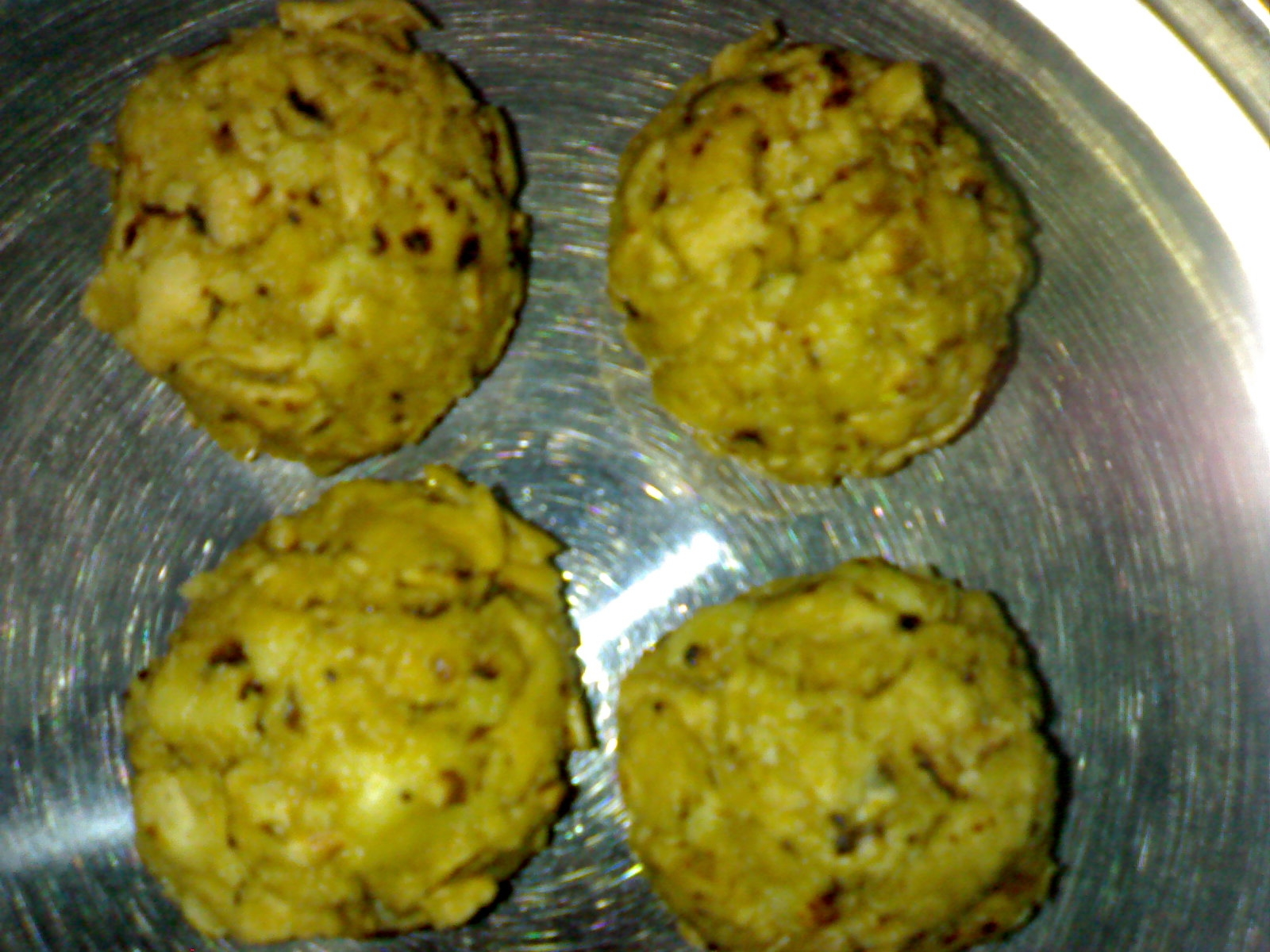
Maleeda

For 9 days of festival each day a Nivedyam or a special dish sattu is prepared and offered to the goddess. General ingredients of the dishes are Corn (మొక్క జొన్నలు), Sorghum (జొన్నలు), Bajra (సజ్జలు), Black Gram (మినుములు), Bengal Gram (శనగలు), Green Gram (పెసలు), Ground Nuts (వేరుశనగకాయలు), Sesame (నువ్వులు), Wheat (గోధుమలు), Rice (బియ్యము), Cashew Nut (జీడిపప్పు), Jaggery (బెల్లం), Milk (పాలు) etc. Maleeda - a combination of Roti and Jaggery, is prepared on this day and distributed at the end of the event.

== Guinness World Records ==
Bathukamma Festival organised by the state Government, have set two new Guinness World Records on 29 September 2025. The two world records for its largest Bathukamma floral decoration consist of about seven tonnes of flowers and of 63.11 feet high, 11 feet wide. The second record for the highly synchronized performance by a large number of women of 1354. Guinness World Records officials declared the performance as a world record and presented certificates to ministers Jupally Krishna Rao Rao and Seethakka. Miss World 2025 Suchata Chuangsri, Hyderabad Mayor Gadwal Vijayalaxmi and Vimalakka also graced the celebrations.
