= 2 Countries (2017 film) =

- Theatrical release poster
- Directed by: N. Shankar
- Produced by: N. Shankar
- Starring: Sunil; Manisha Raj
- Cinematography: C. Ramprasad
- Edited by: Kotagiri Venkateswara Rao
- Music by: Gopi Sundar
- Production company: Mahalakshmi Arts
- Release date: 29 December 2017
- Country: India
- Language: Telugu

2 Countries is a 2017 Indian Telugu-language romantic comedy film directed by N. Shankar starring Sunil and Manisha Raj. It is the remake of the Malayalam film, 2 Countries (2015). The film is also produced by Shankar under the Banner of Mahalakshmi Arts. Gopi Sundar composed music for this film while C. Ram Prasad and Kotagiri Venkateswara Rao handled the cinematography and editing departments respectively. The film released on 29 December 2017.

== Plot ==
The plot of the film revolves around Ullas (Sunil), who makes a living by deceiving people in his home town. Money is the only motivator that works for him and he wants it without any risks. For making money he decides to marry a disabled women, Simran. But when a better proposal comes from an Indo-Canadian woman Laya (Manisha Raj), he chooses her. Immigration to Canada and easy money lures him. Only later does Ullas comes to the knowledge that Laya is a chronic alcoholic. The knowledge of funds deposited in her name, that Laya cannot claim due to her alcoholism, and the possibility of access entices him however and he adjusts with the troubles. In time Ullas falls in love with his alcoholic wife, and the call of a husband makes him care for Laya even in troubles. Laya comes to knowledge about Ullas's original plan through Avinash, Ullas's friend, accidentally. This leads to a divorce case. Initially Ullas gains the upper hand from the court, citing his wife is an alcoholic and she needs treatment and that the divorce case is resistance towards it. Laya gets treated through a de-addiction center. By the guidance of the doctor, Ullas goes with the divorce process to help Laya. Ullas returns and decides to marry Simran. Later Laya understands about the role of Ullas for her wellness, through certain unexpected turn of events they get together again.

== Cast ==
- Sunil as Ullas Kumar
- Manisha Raj as Laya
- Naresh as Murthy
- Prudhviraj as Jimmy
- Srinivas Reddy as Bose
- Raja Ravindra as Laya's father
- Sitara as Laya's mother
- Sanjjana as Tamannah, Laya's step-mother
- Shiju as Laya's step-father

== Soundtrack ==
The soundtrack was composed by Gopi Sundar and it consists of five songs. Lyrics for one song N. Shankar.

Track listing
No.	Title	Lyrics	Singer(s)	Length
1.	"Ullasamlo"	N.Shankar	Haricharan, Kavya	4:17
2.	"Vareva Dollar Baby"	Bhaskarabhatla	Ranjith	4:42
3.	"Cheliya Cheliya Vidipoke Kalala"	Nandini Sidha Reddy	Karthik, Abaya	4:54
4.	"Chiru Chiru Navvullo"	Shreshta	Saketh Komanduri	4:46
5.	"Hey People"	Niranj Suresh	Niranj Suresh	2:10
Total length:				18:49

== Reception ==
The Times of India "(g)ives this one a miss unless you have time to kill and want to watch this film just for Sunil." "telugu360.com" reviewed the movie as a disappointing comedy film! and gave a rating of 2/5.
