= N. Shankar =

Indian film director

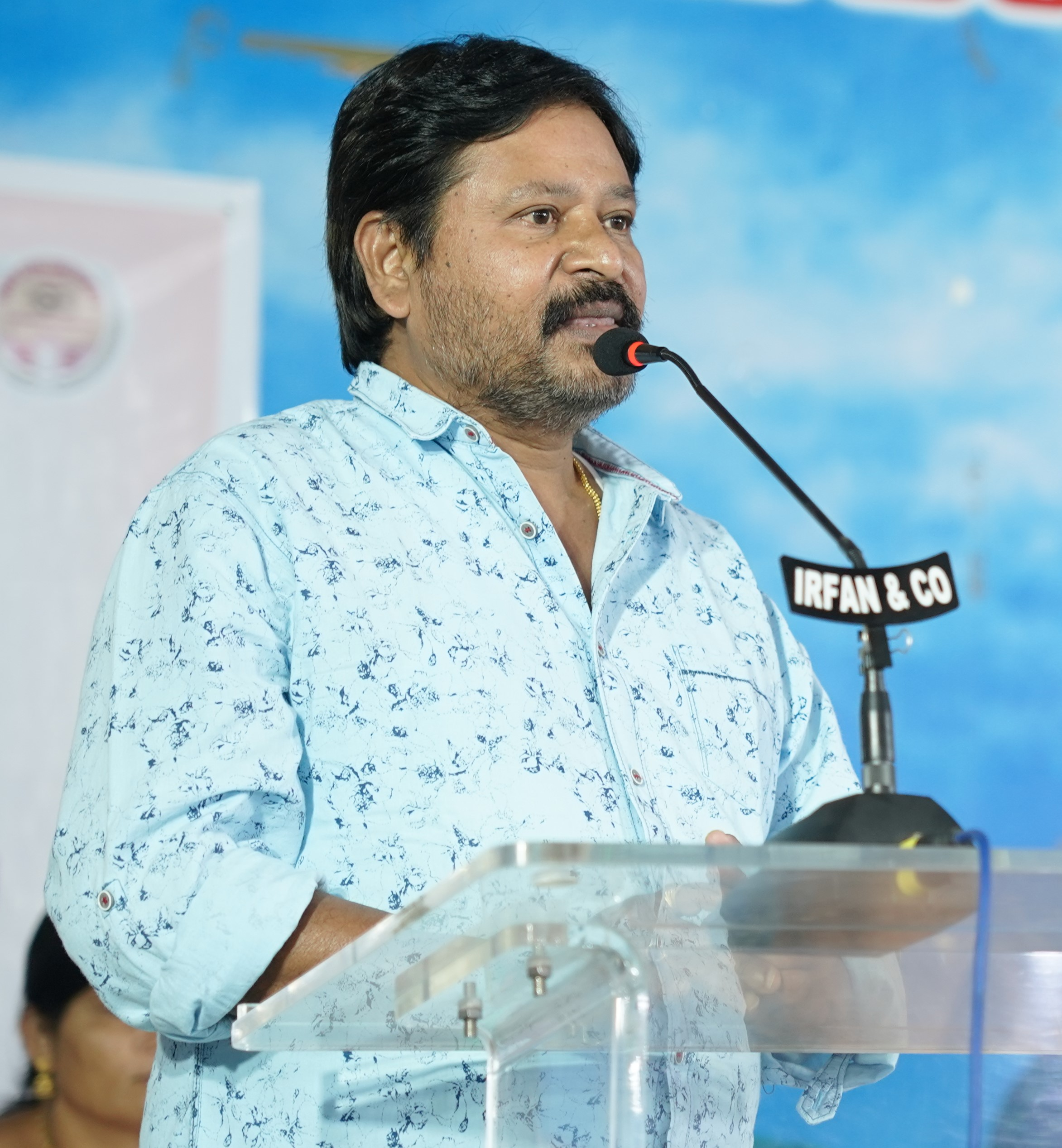
- Born: Madgulapally, Telangana, India
- Occupation: Director
- Years active: 1997–present
- Parent(s): Nimmala Guruvayya; Nimmala Sakkubayamma

Nimmala Shankar is an Indian film director, known for his works in Telugu cinema. He is known for directing blockbuster films like Jayam Manade Raa. In 2011, he directed Jai Bolo Telangana, which won five Nandi Awards and was screened at the 6th South Asian Film Festival, held in Goa during September 2011.

== Early life ==
He was born in Nalgonda District, Madgulapally Mandal, Chirumarthy village, Telangana.

== Awards ==
Nandi Awards

- Sarojini Devi Award for a Film on National Integration (director) - Jai Bolo Telangana (2011)
- Nandi Award for Best Director - Jai Bolo Telangana (2011)

== Filmography ==
- Encounter (1997)
- Sri Ramulayya (1998)
- Yamajathakudu (1999)
- Jayam Manade Raa (2000)
- Bhadrachalam (2001)
- Aayudham (2003)
- Nammanna (2005) (Kannada)
- Raam (2006)
- Jai Bolo Telangana (2011)
- Two Countries (2017)
