= Deshapati Srinivas =

Indian singer

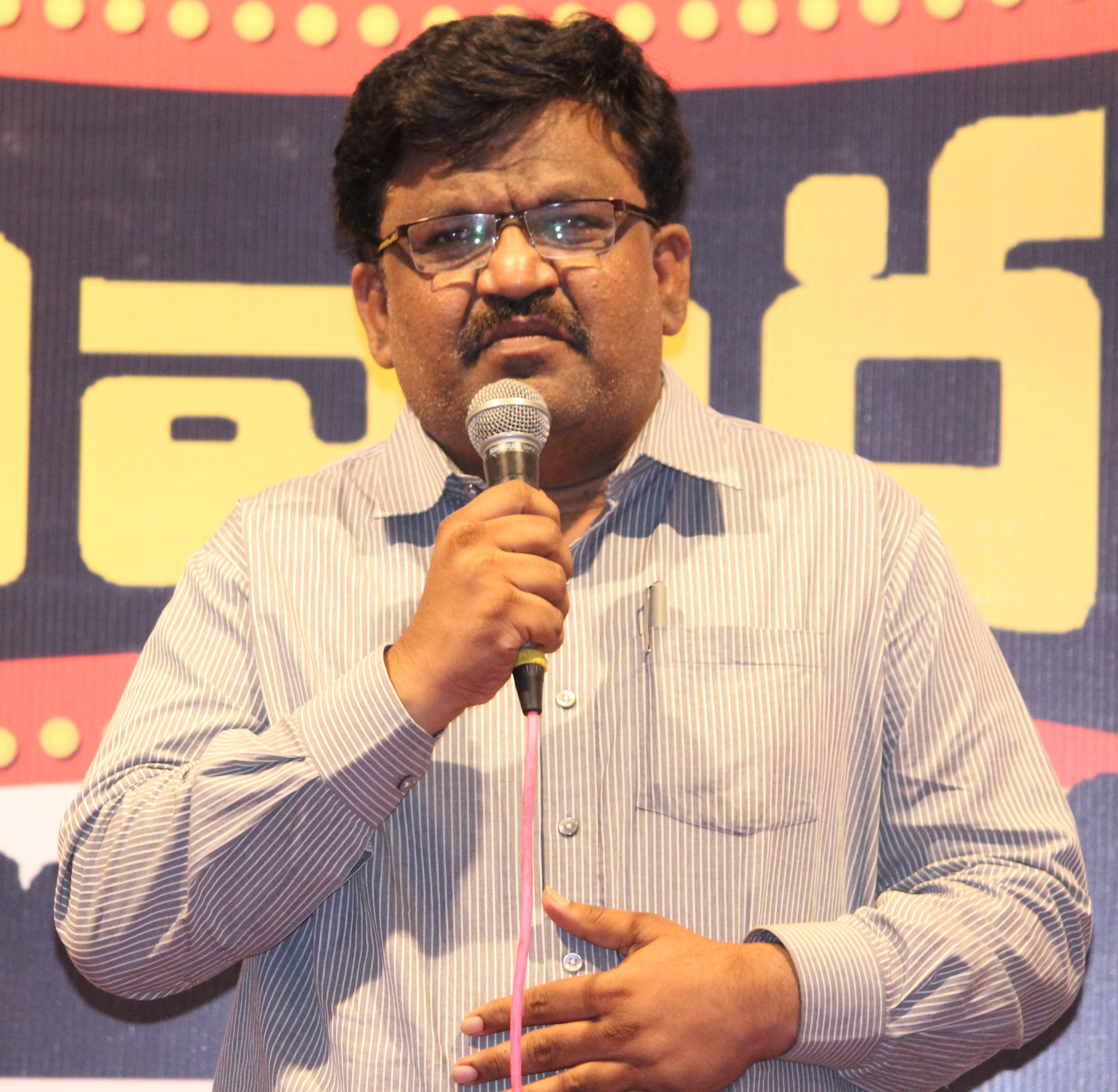
- Srinivas in Cinivaram

Member of Legislative Council
- Incumbent
- Assumed office 30 March 2023
- Constituency: MLA quota

Personal details
- Born: 1970 (age 55–56) Siddipet, Telangana, India)
- Occupation: Ex Officer on special duty to chief minister Government of Telangana
- Known for: Activist, Singer, Lyricist

Deshapathi Srinivas (born 1970) is an Indian lyricist, singer and Officer on Special Duty (OSD) to Chief Minister, Government of Telangana. He is one of the key leaders of Telangana Separation Movement. His songs are eloquent. He is an advocate for the separation of Telangana. He takes an active role in Government of Telangana, Telugu language promotion.

== Early life ==
He was born in a village in Siddipet, Medak district, Telangana to Gopalakrisha and Bala Saraswati. His father use to write poems in Telugu and Urdu. He did his graduation in Medak.

== Career ==
Deshapati Srinivas was a school teacher. He travels to all major public meetings and rallies organised for Telangana Separation. He is often invited to Television talk shows to discuss Telangana Movement.

His lyrics are sometimes used in movies. He is famous for singing popular Telangana song, Nageti sallala na Telangana, which was written by Nandini Sidda Reddy.

== Political career ==
Deshapathi Srinivas who was serving as Officer on Special Duty in the Chief Minister’s Office his name was announced as MLC candidate under the MLA quota for the State Legislative Council by BRS President and Chief Minister K. Chandrashekar Rao on 7 March 2023 and he was elected unopposed As the Opposition parties did not have the required strength to field candidates.
