= Allam Narayana =

Indian journalist and poet (born 20th century)

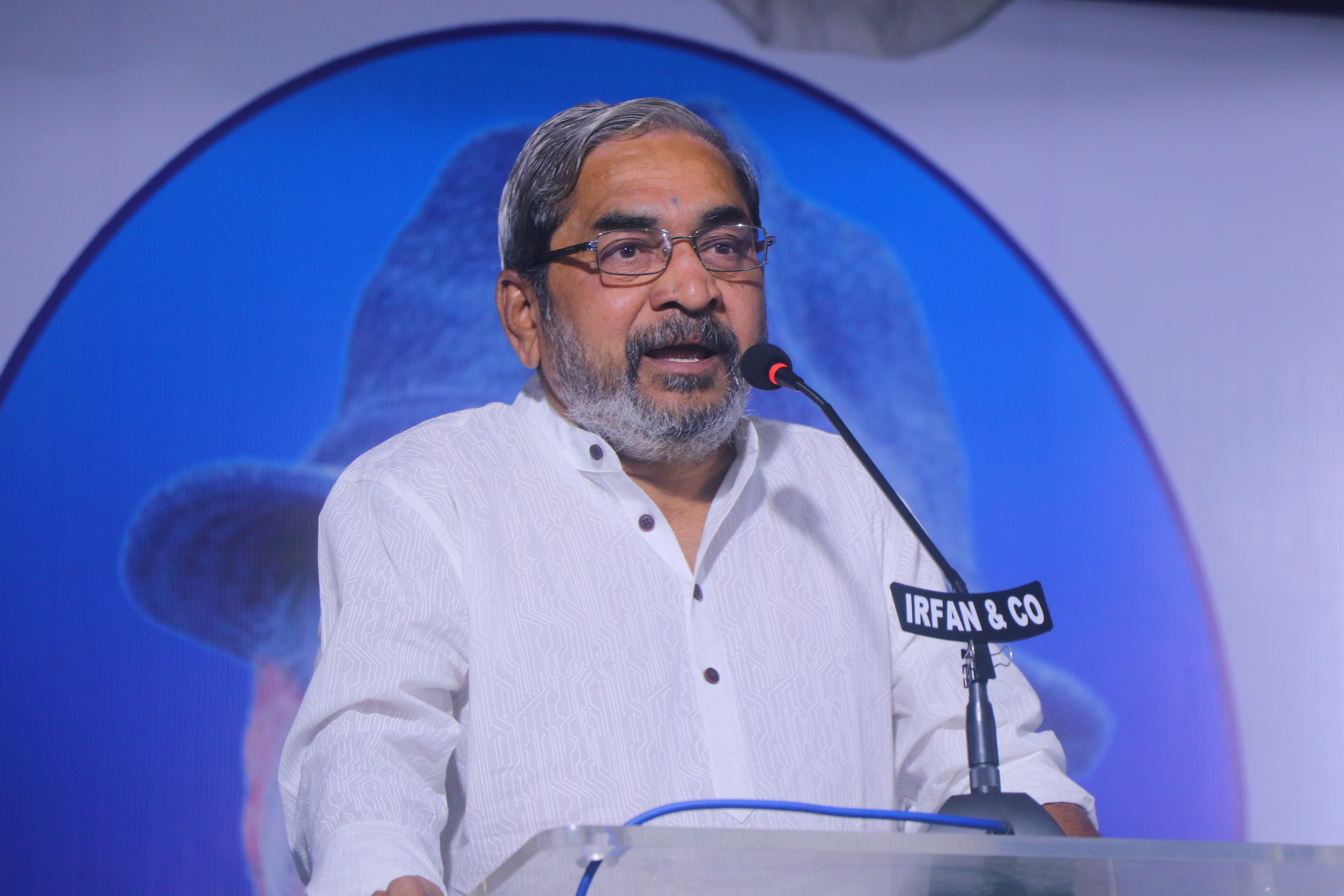
- Born: 20th century
- Occupations: Chairman, Telangana Press Academy
- Known for: Journalism, poetry

Allam Narayana (born 20th century) is an Indian Telugu-language journalist, and poet; he has also worked as the chief editor of the Namaste Telangana newspaper.

He is the first chairman of the Telangana Press Academy. He is also the founder and president of a Telangana journalist union.

Narayana belongs to the Perike (Puragiri Kshatriya) caste.
