= Kolanupaka =

Village in Telangana, India

Coordinates: 17°41′39″N 79°02′04″E

- Interactive map of Kolanupaka
- Country: India
- State: Telangana
- District: Yadadri Bhuvanagiri district

Population (2011)
  - Total: 8,860

Kolanupaka is a village in the Yadadri Bhuvanagiri district, in the Indian state of Telangana.

== Landmarks ==
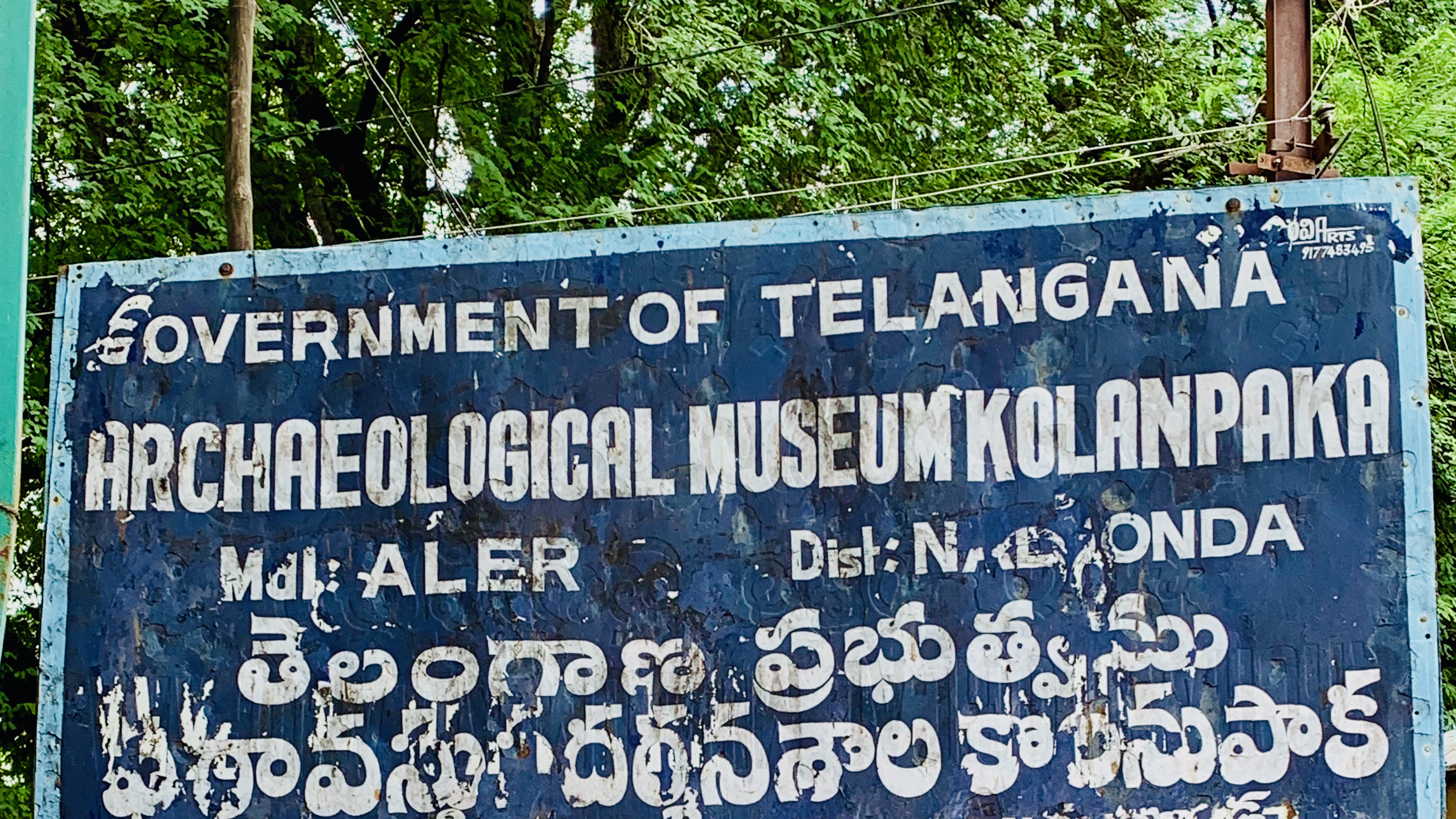
Museum

The Kulpakji temple is located here.

The Kolanpuaka Museum houses artefacts unearthed here.

== Demographics ==
According to the 2011 census, the village had a population of 8860, in 2289 households.
