= Peerla Panduga =

Festival celebrated in Andhra Pradesh and Telangana, India

Peerla Pandugu
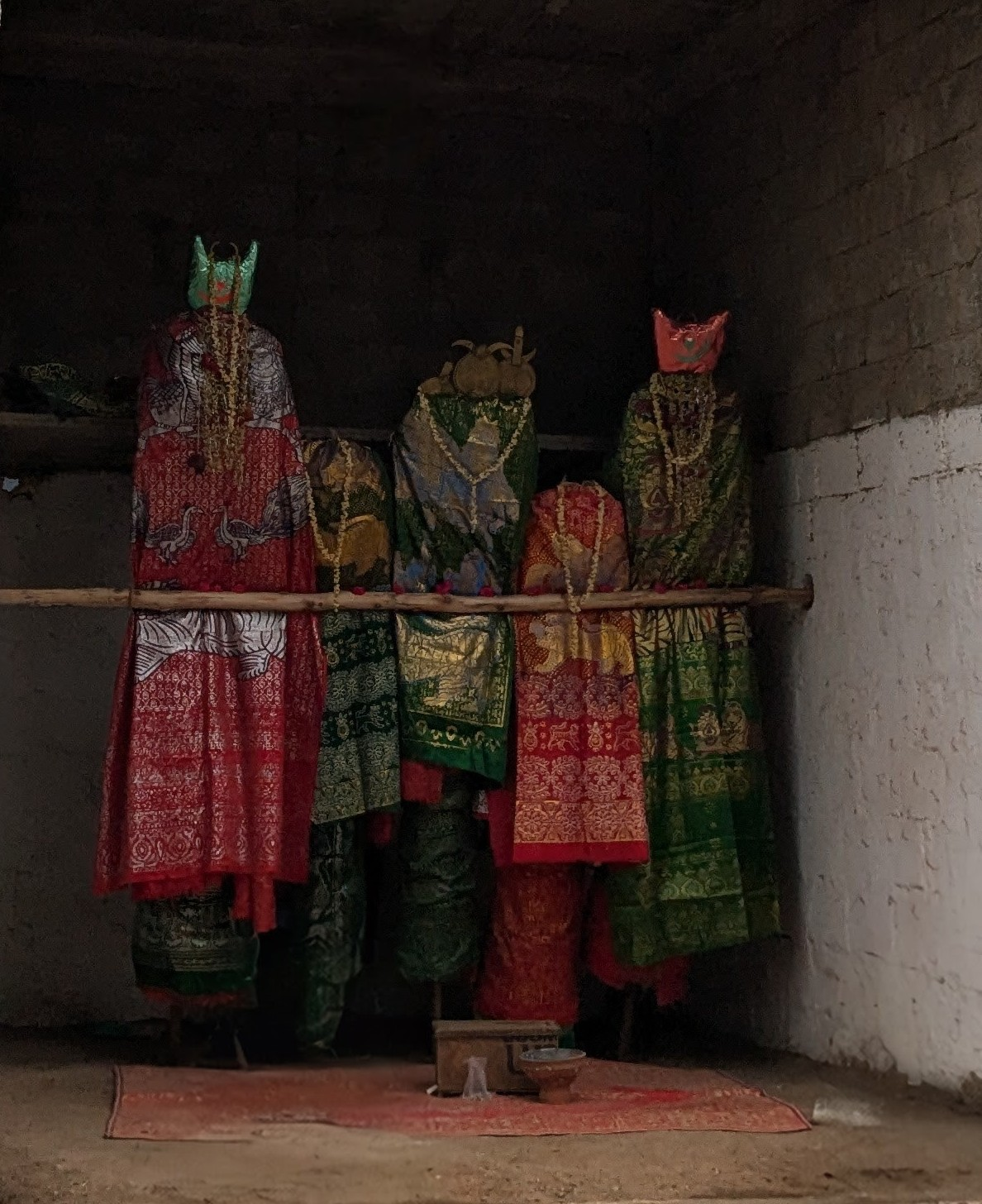
- Alam or Peerlu
- Observed by: Hindus and Muslims across Telangana and Rayalseema

Peerla Panduga is a mourning festival celebrated by Muslims in Telangana and in the Rayala Seema region of Andhra Pradesh to remember the Battle of Karbala. It is mourned across the Sufi shrines called Ashurkhana. A procession of the relic, called Alam is taken out as part of Muharram. There may be multiple relics donated by various members of the procession. Some villages in Telangana have relics that have been donated through generation by the members of the same family (Nasarla Palle, Telangana).

Traditionally for many centuries, the Sunni Islamic scholars who are called "Islamic peers" would encourage their followers to organise programmes in remembrance of the martyrdom of Imam Hussain and his family members and friends and offer Salah and recite Quran and Hadith of the prophet Muhammad about the Ahl al-Bayt and mourn in silence and shed tears by remembering them (without self-flagellation) the day in which Yazeed ibn Muawiya happened to kill Imam Hussain (grandson of Muhammad).

On this day, the Shia (followers of the Imam Hussain) mourn the martyrdom of him by self-flagellation.

In Hyderabad and in Telangana over the past few decades is celebrated a festival called "Peerla Pandaga" wherein the Sunni conducts programmes in remembrance of Imam Hussain and the Shia self-flagellate their bodies throughout the month of Muharram and exclusively to bleed on Ashura.

In certain parts, especially in Rayalaseema regions of Andhra Pradesh, a firepit known as Gunnam is dug, typically at the permanent spot in the middle of the village, and fire is burned using old trees around the village as a sacrifice to God, and processions of the Peerlu are taken over the village and then around the firepit in week-long festivities. People will also walk on the burning coals in the firepit to fulfill their wishes (mokkubadi).

The Peerla Pandaga is seen as a festival of religious harmony since many Hindu majority villages celebrate the festival, without being bothered about the reasons behind it. Many Hindu temples, like the Gugudu Kullayaswami temple in Anantapur district, are famous for celebrating the festival grandly.
