= Warangal Museum =

Museum in Warangal, Telangana, India

Coordinates: 17.990961°N 79.588481°E

- Location: Warangal, Telangana, India

Warangal ASI Museum is a museum located in the musical garden complex in Warangal, Telangana, India. It is maintained by Archaeological Survey of India.

== The collection ==
It has a collection of Hindu, Buddhist and Jain sculpture housed in a single-storeyed building. The Notable pieces in the garden are a large Nandi and several Saivite sculptures along with the Marble Buddha and Chamunda.

It also contains the 11th century Parsvanatha image and Shanmukha or Skanda from the 12th century Veerabhadra image. It also have the collection of ancient coins and pottery shards from the area. It describes the Kakatiya temple sites in the area, including the 13th century temples at Pillalamarri in Nalgonda district.
