= Jamalapuram =

- village
- Location in Telangana, India Jamalapuram (India)
- Coordinates: 16°49′54″N 80°31′11″E
- Country: India
- State: Telangana
- District: Khammam

Languages
  - Official: Telugu
- Time zone: UTC+5:30 (IST)
- Vehicle registration: TS
- Nearest city: Khammam
- Lok Sabha constituency: Khammam
- Website: telangana.gov.in

Jamalapuram is a small village located near Errupalem, a town in the Khammam district of Telangana, India. The village has a population of more than 3000 people. Its main landmark is a temple dedicated to Venkateswara.
