= Vimalakka =

Singer and social activist

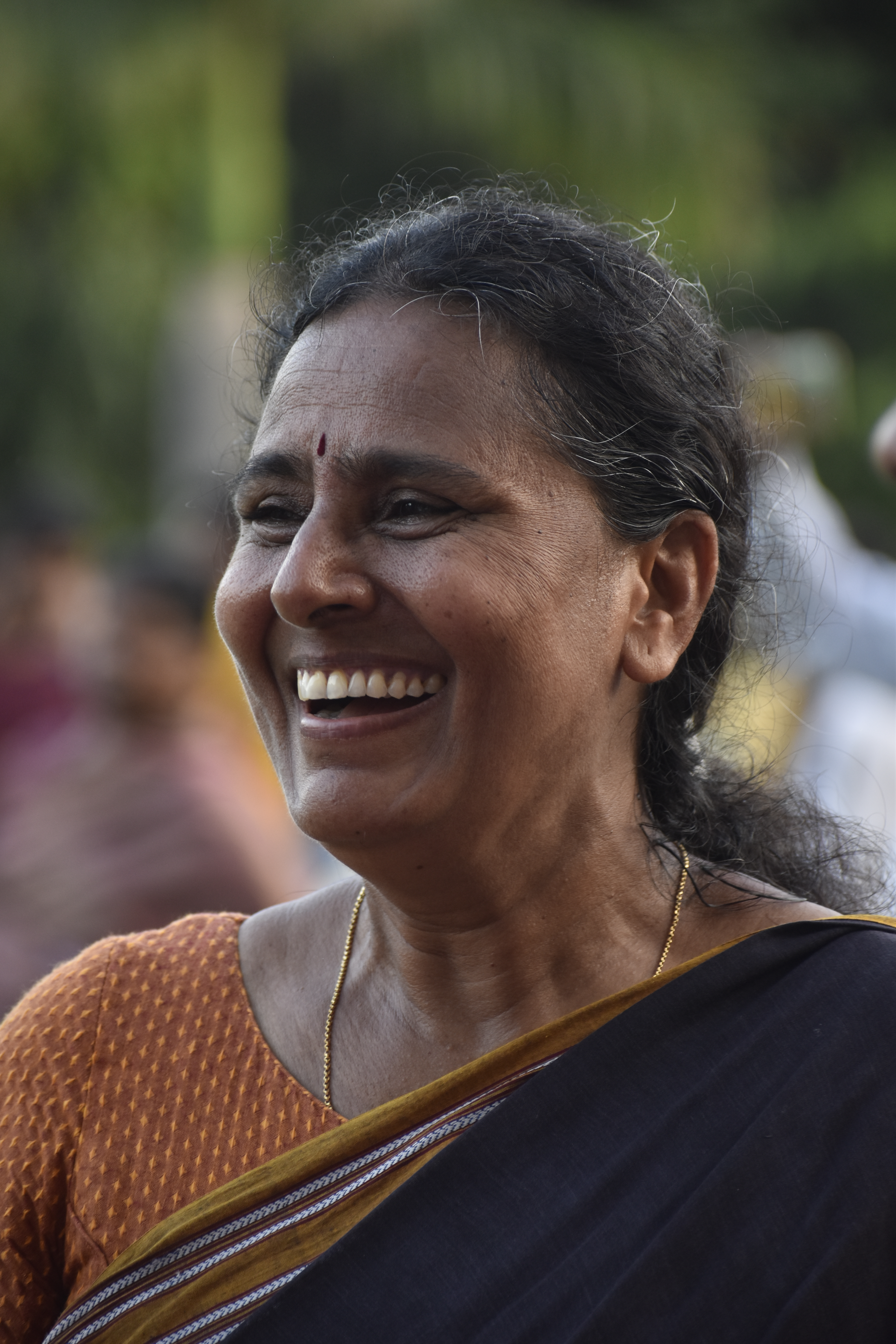
- Constituency: Aleru

Personal details
- Born: 1964 (age 61–62) Kolanupaka, Aleru, Nalgonda, Telangana
- Party: Telanganna United Front (TUF)
- Spouse: Amar

Arunodaya Vimala (born 1964), popularly known as Vimalakka, is a Telugu balladeer and social activist. Her folk troupe is known as Arunodaya Samskritika Samakhya (ACF). She also heads a Joint Action Committee for the creation of Telangana state.

== Early life ==
Vimalakka was born in Aler village in Nalgonda district to Narsamma and Bandru Narsimayya, a Telangana revolutionary who participated in Telangana rebellion. She belongs to Kurma community. She was youngest among five children. She did her graduation in Bhongir.

== Life ==
Vimalakka was greatly influenced by her father's association with the rebellion. She started singing at a young age after being encouraged by Ram Sattaiah, an activist. She fought against Jogini system. She was a civil rights, woman's activist.

She has been fighting for Telangana statehood since 1995. She is now touring Telangana districts by organizing folk concerts, Telangana dhoom-dhaam & Bathukamma Festival.

She married Koora Devender, the revolutionary party leader of CPI (ML) Janashakthi. She is the president of Arunodaya Cultural Federation (ACF) which played a key role in formation of Telangana state by their cultural programmes coordinated by Mohan Bairaagi the vice president of the cultural federation.

She also has number of police cases during separate Telangana statehood movement. She was in jail for 4 months with her cultural organisation colleagues Mohan Bairaagi, Santhosh, Venkat, Mallu, and others. Now she is working for Saamajika Telangana with her organisation Telangana United Front (TUF) as chairperson.

Her mother in law Koora Mallama (101) died on 31 January 2019, at Vemulawada Rajanna Siricilla district, Telangana.
