= List of Telugu films of 1983 =

This is a list of films produced by the Tollywood (Telugu language film industry) based in Hyderabad in the year 1983. Total movies released 150

(A) stands for Adult in that year, present day Parental Guidance(PG) - may contain vulgar, slang, language, violence, etc. etc., NR Likely Not Released, missed CBFC rating

(R) Regular Show, (M) Morning Show, (N) Noon Show

== Released films ==
Title	Director	Production	Music	Cast	Genre	Release
Aalaya Sikharam	Kodi Ramakrishna (Screenplay/Direction)	Sri Lalitha Movies	Chakravarthy	Chiranjeevi, Sumalatha, Sowcar Janaki, Sharadha	Drama PG (UA)	7 May 1983
Adavalle Aligithe	Satyanarayana Vejella Lyrics: Nellutla	Vijayachitra Pictures	Krishna – Chakra	Rajendra Prasad, Ranganath, Nutan Prasad, Y. Vijaya, Devika, Rajeswari, Varalakshmi, Rajyalaksmi,	U Comedy	3 December 1983
Abhilasha	A. Kodandarami Reddy		Ilaiyaraaja	Chiranjeevi, Radhika, Rao Gopal Rao	Thriller (A)	11 March 1983
Adadhi Aata Bommaa!	R. K. Battula (Story/Direction) Dialogues: Swarnasri, Satyanand Lyrics: Acharya Thirumala, S. Ghanes Rao	R. K. Battula Productions	Gopalakrishna	Sekthi, Sony, Saikiran, S. S. Reddy, Raviraj, R. M. Joshi, Prabhakar, Umarani, Chitralekha, Jyothikiran, A. Radhakrishna, Sodala Prabhakar, Narasimha Reddy	(A)	??.??.1983
Adavi Simhalu	K. Raghavendra Rao Dialogues: Satynand Lyrics: Veturi Art: Bhaskara Raju Editor: Kotagiri Venkateswara Rao	Vaijayanthi Movies	Chakravarthy	Krishnam Raju, Krishna, Jaya Prada, Sridevi, Silk Smitha, Rao Gopala Rao, Kaikala Satyanarayana, Allu Rama Lingaiah, Prasad Babu, Maada, LuLu (Chimpanzee)	ActionScope U	28 April 1983
Agni Jwala	Boyina Subba Rao, Tripuraneni Varaprasad (co-director) Screenplay: M. D. Sundhar Story: GVK unit Dialogues: Satyanand	G.V.K. Combines	Satyam	Mohan Babu, Kavitha, Naresh, Aruna, Annapurna, Kaikala Satyanarayana, Dr. M. Prabhakar Reddy, Giri Babu, Allu Rama Lingaiah, Tyagaraju, Suthi Janta,		14 July 1983
Agni Samadhi	K. S. R. Das Dialogues: Atreya Lyrics: Atreya	Makkal Thilagam Pictures	Satyam	Naresh, Kaikala Satyanarayana, Jaggaiah, Rao Gopala Rao	(A)	21 October 1983
Akka Mogudu Chelleli Kapuram	Katta Subba Rao Story and Dialogues: D. V. Narasa Raju Lyrics: Veturi	Sowmya International	Chakravathy	Chandra Mohan, Prabha, Kavitha, Ramji, Allu Rama Lingaiah, P. L. Narayana, Tyagaraju, Rallapalli, Suryakantham, Nutan Prasad, Chakravarthy	(A) Comedy	14 January 1983
Amarajeevi	Jandhyala (Screenplay/Direction/Dialogues) Lyrics: Veturi	Jyothi Art Creations	Chakravarthy	Akkineni Nageswara Rao, Jaya Prada, Sumalatha, Sarath Babu, Narasimha Raju, Pandari Bai Srilakshmi, Nagesh, Kanta Rao, Sakshi Ranga Rao, Sutti Velu, Shankar, Tham, Master Hari, Baby Kavitha		19 August 1983
Amayakudu Kadhu Asadhyudu	Vijaya Nirmala (Screenplay/Direction) Dialogues: Appalacharya Story: Dundi Lyrics: Arudhra, Kosaraju, Veturi, Appalacharya, Nellutla	Sesirekha Movies	Satyam	Krishna, Jayasudha, Anjali Devi, Kaikala Satyanarayana, Prathap Potan, Sudhakar, Ramji, Thulasi, Syamala Gowri, Tyagaraju, Giri Babu		30 June 1983
Amayaka Chakravarthy	Janardhan (Screenplay/Direction) Dialogues: Kasi Viswanath Lyrics: Veturi, Sivadatta	Lalini Chitra	Krishna & Chakra	Chandra Mohan, Vijaya Santhi, Jayamalini, Krishnaveni, Anitha, Baby Sunitha, Gokina Rama Rao, Chakrapani, Chitti Babu, Rajesh, Nailinikanth, Rallapalli (Guest Actors) Nutan Prasad, Gollapudi, Maruthi Rao	(A)	25 March 1983
Andhra Kesari	Thirumalai, Vijayachander (Direction) Vijayachander (Screenplay) Ravi Raja Pinisetty Dialogues: Modhukuri Johnson Lyrics: SriSri, Arudra, Dr. Cnare, Modhukuri Johnson	Radha Chitra Combines	Satyam	Vijayachander, Jagapati Babu, Kausalya, Heera Rajagopal	Biographical (U) CBFC	20 May 1983
Antham Chusina Adadhi		J. W. International			(A) CBFC	10 June 1983
Apadhbandhavulu		Sri Aparna Movies			(U) CBFC 22 June 1983	NR
Bahudoorapu Batasari	Dasari Narayana Rao (Story/Dialogues/Lyrics/Screenplay/Direction)	Tharaka Prabhu Films	Ramesh Naidu	Akkineni Nageswara Rao, Sujatha, Suhasini, Gummadi Venkateswara Rao, Dr. M. Prabhakar Reddy, Dasari Narayana Rao, Jaggaiah, Rama Krishna, Allu Rama Lingaiah, Narayana Rao, Bhanu Chandar, Raajaa, Rama Prabha	Drama (U)	19 May 1983
Balidaanam	S. A. Chandrasekhar (Screenplay, Direction) Dialogues: Kasi Viswanadha Rao, Lyrics: Veturi, Atreya, Gopi	Santhosh Art Movies	Chakravarthy	Shoban Babu, Madhavi, Gummadi, Rao Gopala Rao, Nirmala, Jaggaiah, Allu Rama Lingaiah, Balakrishna, Nutan Prasad, Sakshi Ranga Rao, Chandramohan (Cameo)	Action (A)	1 January 1983
Bandhipotu Rudramma	K. S. Reddy		Satyam	Kavitha, Vijaya Lalitha, Narasimha Raju, Jeeva	(A)	9 April 1983
Bezawada Bebbuli	Vijaya Nirmala	Sri Vijaya Rama Pictures	Chakravarthy	Sivaji Ganesan, Krishna, Vijaya Nirmala, Sowcar Janaki, Radhika, Kaikala Satyanarayana, Peketi Sivarao, Mada, Syamala Gowri		14 January 1983
Bhairava Kona	This needs further verification	Sri Sai Datta Films			(A) CBFC 11 October 1994	??.??.1983
Bhama Rukmini (Tamil Dubbed)	R. Bhaskaran (Direction) K. Bhagyaraj (Story/Screenplay) Dialogues: Vasantha Kumar Lyrics: Vituri	S.V.S Creations	M. S. Viswanathan	K. Bhagyaraj, Radhika, Praveena, Nagesh	Drama (U) CBFC	15 October 1983
Bharathamma Muddu Biddalu	Veera (Screenplay/Direction) A. Nageswara Rao Story/Producer Dialogues: Masterji Lyrics: Veera, Uthpala Varada Raja – Songs 4 Records: ACE/SEA	Fabina Art Creations	K. S. Murthy		CBFC not found Likely (NR)	??.??.1983
Bharya Bharthala Sawal	Chandrashekar Reddy Story: N. V. Subbaraju Dialogues: Modhukuri	Padmaja Kalamadhir	Raj–Koti	Mohan Babu, Sumalatha, Rao Gopala Rao, Aruna, Rajesh, Nutan Prasad, Syamala Gowri		7 October 1983
C I D Simham (Kannada Dub Sahasa Simha 1982)	Joe Simon (Screenplay/Direction) Dialogues: Bhusrapu Lyrics: Veturi	Dinesh Arts	Satyam	Vishnuvardha, Kajal Kiran, Rajya Lakshmi, Prabhakar, Vajramuni	(A) CBFC	??.??.1983
Challenge Vetagallu (Kannada Dubbed)	S. V. Rajendra Singh	Sri Vigneswara Cine Art Creations	Ilayaraja	Ambareesh, Shankar Nag, Jayamala, Swapna, M. P. Shankar		23 June 1983
Chanda Sasanudu	N. T. Rama Rao			N. T. Rama Rao, Radha	Action	28 May 1983
Chandi Chamundi (Dubbed Hindi version – Maut ka Badla Maut – 1985)	K. S. Reddy Story/Dialogues: Perala Lyrics: Dr. Cnare, Rajasri (Disco Disco Disco) Playback: S. Janaki	Surekha Pictures	Satyam	Kavitha, Vijaya Lalitha, Nutan Prasad, Sakshi Rangarao, Jeeva, Bindu Ghosh Raja (Elephant)		16 December 1983
Chandi Rani	P. Chandrasekhara Reddy Story: N. V. Subba Raju Dialogues: Srinivasa Reddy Lyrics: Veturi, Appalacharya	Sri Vani Arts	Raj–Koti	Suman, Kavitha, Syamala Gowri, Gollapudi, Jayamala, Radha Kumari	(A)	11 November 1983
Chattam (Tamil Dubbed)	K. Vijayan	Suresh Arts	Gangai Amaran	Kamal Haasan, Madhavi, Sarath Babu, Jaishankar, Manorama, Y. G. Mahendra, Sathyakala, Silk Smitha	Action	4 November 1983
Chattaniki Sawal (Tamil Dubbed Sattathukku Oru Saval)	M. Karnan	G. C. Arts	Shankar Ganesh, Ramakrishna Raja	Suman, Madhavi, Silk Smitha	Action	16 December 1983
Chattaniki Veyi Kallu	Vijaya Nirmala (Screenplay/Direction) Dialogues: Paruchuri Brothers	Ranjit Arts	Chakravarthy	Krishna (Dual Role), Jaya Sudha, Madhavi, Nutan Prasad, Rao Gopala Rao, Allu Rama Lingaiah, Giri Babu, Tyagaraju, Ravi Kondala Rao, Jayamalini, Nirmala, Kanta Rao, Rajanala		31 March 1983
Chilaka Josyam	M. Pardha Saradhi	Aadi Sekti Chitra				21 April 1983
Darling, Darling, Darling (Tamil Dubbed)	K. Bhagyaraj Dialogues/Lyrics: Rajasri	Amaravathy Arts	Shankar–Ganesh	K. Bhagyaraj, Poornima Jayaram, Suman, Aruna, Baby Anju	Romance, Drama(U) CBFC	14 May 1983
Debbaku Debba (Tamil Dubbed)	S. P. Mutturaman	J.K Films (AVM Productions)	Ilaiyaraaja	Rajinikanth, Radha, Jaishankar, Thiagarajan, V. K. Ramasamy, Manorama, Y. G. Mahendra, Silk Smitha	Action (U)	13 May 1983
Desanikokkadu	C. V. Rajendran Story: Gollapudi Dialogues: Bhusrapu, Lyrics: Rajasri, Vituri	Ajai Art Creations	Ilaiyaraaja	Rajinikanth, Madhavi, Jaya Malini	(U) CBFC 8 April 1983	12 August 1983
Devi Kanaykumari (Tamil Dubbed)	P. Subramaniam Lyrics: Veeturi (Records- AVM Music Service)1982	Sabari Art Pictures	Devarajan	Baby Vinodini, Kaviyoor Ponnamma, Thikkurissy Sukumaran Nair, Kedamangalam, Sadanandan, Prema, Shubha, Raghavan, Unnimary, Adoor Bhavani, Adoor Pankajam	Devotional (U)	21 May 1983
Devi Moogambika (Tamil Dubbed)	K. Shankar Dialogues/Lyrics: Rajasri	Vijaya Adhitya Creations	Ilaiyaraaja	K. R. Vijaya, Sivakumar, Jaishankar, Sujatha, Saritha, Major Sundarrajan, Karthik, Poornima, Jayaram, Thengai Srinivasan, Manorama, Murali	Devotional CBFC (U)	20 May 1983
Devi Sridevi	Raja Chandra Story: Balamurugan Dialogues: Poosala	Jayabheri Art Productions	Chakravarthy	Jayasudha, Radhika, Murali Mohan, Giri Babu, Gummadi, Tulasi, Dr. M. Prabhakar Reddy, Prabha, Rajesh		7 October 1983
Dharma Poratam	Boyina Subba Rao	Sri Lakshmi Prasanna Pictures	Satyam	Mohan Babu, Gummadi Venkateswara Rao, Pandari Bai, Giri Babu	(A)	4 February 1983
Dharmaatmudu	B. Bhaskara Rao Story: Dr. M. Prabhakara Reddy	Sri Bramarambika Films	Satyam	Krishnam Raju, Jayasudha, Vijaya Santhi, Gummadi	Drama (U)	16 September 1983
Digivachina Devudu (Kannada Dubbed)	K. S. L. Swamy (Ravi) (First Telugu Song by Mahendra Kapoor)	Katyayani Creations	G. K. Venkatesh	Lokesh, Jai Jagadish, Lakshmi, Vajramuni, Roja Ramani	PG (UA)	9 September 1983
Doctor Gari Kodalu (Tamil Dubbed)	Muktha Srinivasan			Sivaji Ganesan, Saritha		18 February 1983
Durga Devi	Nandam Harischandra Rao Dialogues: Paruchuri Brothers	Vijaya Madhavee Pictures	J. V. Raghavulu	Mohan Babu, Murali Mohan, Jayasudha, Sarada, Geetha		8 July 1983
Ee Desamlo Oka Roju	Satyanarayana Vejella Dialogues: Paruchuri Gopala Krishna	Kumar Raja Pictures	Chakravarthy	Rajendra Prasad, Kavitha, Sai Chand, Gummadi, Siva Krishna, Nutan Prasad, Jyothi, Geetha	(A)	10 March 1983
Ee Pillaku Pellavuthunda	Vejella Satyanarayana Dialogues: P. Gopala Krishna Lyrics: Nellutla	Sri Bala Balaji Combines	Chakravarthy	Gummadi, Sai Chand, Jyothi, Purnima, Syamala Gowri, Tulasi, Nutan Prasad		26 August 1983
Eeswarudu Seneswarudu (Tamil Dubbed)	B. R. Panthulu	Dasanjaneya Pictures	M. S. Viswanathan	Gemini Ganesan, Jayalalithaa, Jayanthi, Cho, Sivakumar, Manorama	Devotional	4 February 1983
Gaanam (Malayalam Dubbed)	Sreekumaran Thampi	Sarada Movie Creations	Susarla & Upendra Kumar	Jagathy Sreekumar, Adoor Bhasi, Poornima, Lakshmi	Musical Drama	15 December 1983
Gaju Bommalu	Koneru Ravindranath Lyrics: Veturi, Atreya	Natanalaya Combines	Ramesh Naidu	Sarath Babu, Rama Prabha,	(A) CBFC	11 February 1983
Grahanam Vidichindi	Bose (Story/Screenplay/Direction) Dialogues: Dhanam Gopala Krishna	Kalyana Chakravarthi Films	Ramesh Naidu	Murali Mohan, Kavitha, Nutan Prasad, Sakshi Ranga Rao, Gokina Rama Rao, Saradhi, Mikkilineni, Lakshmisri, Kakinada Syamala, Lathapriya, Jhansi		22 July 1983 (Hyd – 18 August 1983)
Gudachari No.1	Kodi Ramakrishna Dialogues: Satyanand Lyrics: Veturi	Vijaya Lakshmi Art Pictures	Chakravarthy	Chiranjeevi, Rao Gopal Rao, Radhika, Gollapudi, Dr. M. Prabhakar Reddy, Satyakala, Raja, P. L. Narayana	Spy Thriller	30 June 1983
Iddaru Kiladeelu (A 1st Telugu movie with real Martial arts, Judo Fights)	Relangi Narasimha Rao Story: Bharat Dialogues: Kasi Viswanath Rao, Bharat Lyrics: SriSri, Gopi	Charitha Chitra	Joy	Suman, Bhanuchandar, Jaya Sudha, Aruna, Sad-hana, Ramana Murthy, Nutan Prasad, Judo Raj,	(A) CBFC	3 June 1983
Idhi Kadhu Mugimpu	Satyanarayana Vejella (Screenplay/Direction) Dialogues: Paruchuri Gopalakrishna Song: 01 Visala Bharata Kiranalam 02 Andhala Bommaku Kalyanamanta	Ureka Cine Enterprises	Sivajiraja	Rajendra Prasad, Geetha, Jyothi, Kaikala Satyannarayana, Ranganath, Narasimharaju, Gummadi Venkateswara Rao, Nutan Prasad, Siva Krishna, Rajya Lakshmi		18 February 1983
Ikanaina Marandi	Gangadhar (Direction) Turayur K. Murthy (Screenplay) Story: M. D. J. Dialogues: Atreya Lyrics: Atreya, Veturi	Easwari Art Pictures	Satyam	Murali Mohan, Jyothi, Gummadi, Allu Rama Lingaiah, Rallapalli, Sakshi Ranga Rao, Ravi Kondala Rao, Vallam Narasimha Rao, Manorama, Attili Lakshmi, Kakinada Syamala, Padma	(A) CBFC	7 May 1983
Intalludu					CBFC not found likely (NR)	??.??.1983
Kasi Yatra		Santhoshi Productions (Siddipeta)			(U) CBFC 28 February 1983	??.??.1983
Kaksha Sadistha						18 June 1983
Kala Yamudu	Nandham Harischandra Rao Story: Balamurugan Dialogues: Paruchuri Brothers Lyrics: Veturi	Sree Pallavi Films	J. V. Raghavulu	Mohan Babu, Sree Pallavi, Sarada, Jayamalini, Dr. M. Prabhakar Reddy, Giri Babu, etc.		13 October 1983
Kaliyuga Dhaivam	M. R. Raju (Story/Screenplay/Direction) Lyrics: Vituri	Sri Raghavendra Art Creations	Satyam	Rama Krishna, Latha, Sarada, Sarath Babu, Kavitha, Allu Rama Lingaiah, Rama Prabha, Jeeva, Pandari Bai		25 August 1983
Kalyana Veena	Giridhar (Direction) Story/Screenplay/Dialogues/Lyrics: Mallemala	Mallemala Creations	Satyam	Suman, Aruna,		17 September 1983
Kanne Donga (Malayalam Dubbed)	Kalanilayam Krishna Kumar	Almighty Films	Ilaiyaraaja	Kamal Haasan, Subhashini, Nagesh, Jyothi Lakshmi,	Thriller (U)	3 June 1983
Kanthaiyya Kanakaiyya						9 July 1983
Keerthi Kantha Kanakam						9 April 1983
Khaidi	A. Kodandarami Reddy		Chakravarthy	Chiranjeevi, Sumalatha, Madhavi, Rao Gopal Rao	Action	28 October 1983
Kirayi Bommalu	Katikaneni Madhusudhana Rao Lyrics: Sri Sri, C. Narayana Reddy, Ramakrishna	Mayur Enterprises	Pendyala	Jayanthi, Prabha, Geetha, Suresh, Ramakrishna, Rallapalli, Jeeva, Pandari Bai, Kalpana Rai, etc.	Action CBFC not found (NR) or shelved	??.??.1983
Kirayi Kotigadu	A. Kodandarami Reddy Dilogues: Satyanand	Ramprasad Art Pictures	Chakravarthy	Krishna, Sridevi, Suhasini, Rao Gopala Rao, Allu Rama Lingaiah, Sridhar, Aruna, Nirmala		17 March 1983
Kirayi Rangadu (Tamil Dubbed)	R. Thyagarajan Dialogues: Vasanth Kumar Lyrics: Vituri, Gopi	Ramana Art Films	Shankar Ganesh & A. A. Raj	Rajinikanth, Radhika, K. R. Vijaya, Raveendran, Silk Smitha		9 July 1983
Kodalu Kaavaali	Giridhar (Story/Screenplay/Direction) Dialogues: Ganesh Pathro	Gowri Art Creations	Satyam	Suman, Purnima, Nutan Prasad, Rupa Chakravarthy, Tyagaraju, Niramala,	(U) CBFC	10 March 1983
Kokilamma	K. Balachander	Lakshmijyothii Films	M. S. Viswanathan	Saritha, Rajesh, Swapna, Chaganti Venkateswara Rao, Krishna Chaitanya,		7 May 1983
Konte Kodallu	Kommineni (Screenplay/Direction) Lyrics: Rajasri, K. Rajeswara Rao, Dr. Cnare	PVS Films	Chakravarthi	Suryakantam, Gollapudi, Sudhakar, Bhanuchandar, Poornima, Tulasi		9 December 1983
Koti Kokkadu	Kommineni Seshagiri Rao	Radha Krishna Movies	Rajan–Nagendra	Krishnam Raju, Jayasudha, Murali Mohan	(U) CBFC 5 August 1983	11 August 1983
Kunkuma Tilakam	B. Bhaskara Rao (Screenplay/Direction) Dialogues: Suri Lyrics: Gopi	Sri Vigneswara Art Pictures	Satyam	Murali Mohan, Jaya Sudha, Hema Sundar, Suresh Oberoi, Ravi Kondala Rao, Pushpalatha, Suresh	(U) CBFC	28 January 1983
Lanke Bindelu	Vijaya Nirmala (Screenplay/Direction) Dialogues: K. Appalacharya Lyrics: Veturi	Ranjit Creations	Rajan–Nagendra	Krishna, Jayasudha, Anjali Devi, Allu Rama Lingaiah, Kanta Rao, Nutan Prasad, Giri Babu, Thyagaraju, Narasimha Raju, Jyothilakshmi, Suryakantam, Annapurna	(U)	10 November 1983
M.L.A. Yedukondalu	Dasari Narayana Rao		Chakravarthy	Dasari Narayana Rao, Jaya Sudha, Sujatha, Gummadi, Dr. M. Prabhakar Reddy, Vankayala, Balaji,		9 January 1983
Maa Intaina Katha	K. Phanindra (Story/Screenplay/Direction) Dialogues: D. Narayana Rao	Gopi Krishna Movie Creations	Rajan–Nagendra	Chandra Mohan, Sulakshana, Padmanabham, Rama Prabha, Fatafat Jayalaxmi, Narasimha Raju, Jaya Malini	(A)	4 March 1983
Maa Inti Premayanam	Aluri Ravi Story/Dialogues: Yerramsetti Sai	Chandramani Productions	J. V. Raghavulu	Chandra Mohan, Sulakshana, Jyothi, Nutan Prasad, Ramaprabha, Prasad Babu, Saradhi Guest role: Sarath Babu, Chiranjeevi	Romance, Drama	11 August 1983
Maa Intiki Randi	Kodi Ramakrishna Lyrics: Dr. Cnare	Lalitha Kalanjali's	J. V. Raghavulu	Kodi Ramakrishna, Suhasin, Banuchandar, Aruna, Gollapudi, Rupa		
Maga Maharaju	Vijaya Bapineedu		Chakravarthy	Chiranjeevi, Suhasini, Rao Gopal Rao, Nutan Prasad	Drama	
Magallako Namaskaram						
Maharani (Tamil Dubbed Nayakkarin Magal 1982)	K. S. Gopalakrishnan No further details available Sheshmahal (R) Sudarshan 70 mm (M) CinemaScope	Sivachitra Movies	Shankar Ganesh	Jayachitra, Jai Ganesh, Vijaykumar, Satyaraj		11 November 1983
Manavulara Manninchandi						
Manishiki Maro Peru	Tatineni Prasad Lyrics: Veturi, Rajasri	Sri Ranga Sai Pictures	K. V. Mahadevan	Chandra Mohan, Sudhakar, Tulasi, Poornima, Gollapudi, Annapoorna		9 December 1983
Manishiko Chartira	Tatineni Prasad	Bhargava Art Productions	Chakravarthy	Murali Mohan, Chandra Mohan, Poornima, Prabha, Suhasini, Gollapudi, Annapoorna		7 January 1983
Mantri Gari Viyyankudu	Bapu		Ilaiyaraaja	Chiranjeevi, Poornima Jayaram, Allu Rama Lingaiah	Drama	
Maro Maya Bazaar	C. S. Rao (Screenplay/Direction) Story/Dialogues: Adhivishnu, Jeedigunta Ramachandra Murthy Lyrics: M. Panchanadham, Vituri	United Art Movies	Satyam	Chandra Mohan, Nutan Prasad, Gokina Rama Rao, Rajya Lakshmi, P. L. Narayana, Surya Kantham, Jayamalini, Krishnaveni, Mada, Chalam, P. J. Serma		14 April 1983
Mayagadu	B. L. V. Prasad (Direction) Story/Screenplay: M.D. Sundhar Dialogues: Parchuri Brothers Lyrics: Atreya, Veturi	Suman Creations	Chakravarthy	Mohan Babu, Purnima, Kavitha, Dr. M. Prabhakar Reddy, Sudhakar, Giri Babu, Nutan Prasad, Saradhi, Kanta Rao, Bhimaraju, Attili Lakshmi, Pandari Bai		30 July 1983
Monagadu Vastunnadu Jagratha	A. Kodandarami Reddy		Satyam	Krishna, Sridevi, Satyanarayana Kaikala		
Moodu Mullu	Jandyala Direction/Dialogues Story: K. Bhagyaraj Lyrics: Veturi, Jyothirmayi		Rajan – Nagendra	Chandra Mohan, Radhika, Geetha, Poornima, Dr. M. Prabhakar Reddy, Sutthi Janta	Romance, Comedy	
Moogavadi Paga	Boyina Subba Rao Story/Screenplay: MD. Sundhar Dialogues: Satyanand Lyrics: Atreya	Madhu Art Pictures	Satyam	Mohan Babu, Kavitha		2 December 1983
Muddula Mogudu	K. S. Prakash Rao	Mahija Films	S. Rajeswara Rao	Akkineni Nageswara Rao, Sridevi, Sararath Babu, Suhasini, Kaikala Satyanarayana, Nagesh	Drama	4 February 1983
Muggurammayila Mogudu	Relangi Narasimha Rao (Screenplay/Direction) Story: Thotakura Ashalatha Dialogues: Pusala Lyrics: Gopi	Nagarjuna Pictures	Chakravarthy	Chandra Mohan, Aruna, Sadhana, Vijji, Kaikala Satyanarayana, Ramana Murthy, Rallapalli, Sutthi Verabhadra Rao, Bhaskar, Ravikant, Jhansi, Ramanna Pantulu	Comedy	26 May 1983
Mugguru Monagallu	T. Rama Rao	Lakshmi Productions	Chakravarthy	Sobhan Babu, Radhika, Lakshmi		14 April 1983
Mundadugu	K. Bapaiah	Suresh Productions	Chakravarthy	Krishna, Sridevi, Shoban Babu, Jaya Prada, Dr. M. Prabhakar Reddy, Gummadi Venkateswara Rao, Kaikala Satyanarayana, Allu Rama Lingaiah, Nutan Prasad, Siva Krishna, Giri Babu, Ravi Kondala Rao, Saradhi, Annapoorna, Surya Kantham,	Social Drama	25 February 1983
Navodayam	P. Chandrashekar Reddy	Chaitanya Art Pictures	Chakravarthy	Madhala Ranga Rao, Mucharla Aruna, Vijayashanthi, Kavitha, Rama Prabha, etc.	(A)	7 January 1983
Nelavanka	Jandhyala			Gummadi, J. V. Somayajulu, Tulasi		14 January 1983
Neti Bharatam	T. Krishna		Chakravarthy	Suman, P. L. Narayana, Vijayashanti, Somayajulu		
Nijam Chebithe Nerama	M. Balaiah (Story/Screenplay/Direction)	Amruta Films	M. S. Viswanathan	Krihnam Raju, Rao Gopala Rao, Nutan Prasad, Jaya Prada, Padmanabham, Mikkilineni, Raavi Kondala Rao, M. Balaiah		14 January 1983
Oorantha Sankranthi	Dasari Narayana Rao (Story/Screenplay/Direction)			Akkineni Nageswara Rao, Krishna, Sridevi, Jayasudha, Kaikala Satyanarayana, Allu Rama Lingaiah, Rao Gopala Rao, Nagesh, Giri Babu, Vankayala, Rama Prabha, Raja Sulochana, Mamatha	Drama	12 February 1983
Padmavathi Kalyanam (likely Tamil Dubbed)	Vijayalakshmi Talkies (R) No further details available				CBFC not found	11 July 1983
Palleturi Monagadu	S. A. Chandrasekhar	Rajyalakshmi Art Movies	Chakravarthy	Chiranjeevi, Radhika, Gollapudi, R. Narayana Murthy, Sutthivelu	Drama (A)	5 February 1983
Palleturi Pidugu	Boina Subba Rao Dialogues: Satyanand Lyrics: Atreya	Vijaya Lakshmi Movies	Satyam	Mohan Babu, Kaikala Satyanarayana, Kanta Rao, Tyagaraju, Kannada Prabhakar, Giri Babu, Kavitha, Pandari Bai, Kalpana Rai	(A)	7 May 1983
Pandanti Kapuraniki 12 Suthralu	Raja Chandra Story/Dialogues: Kasi Viswanath Lyrics: Atreya, Kosaraju	Anantha Lakshmi International	Satyam	Suman, Vijayashanti, Gollapudi, Rambabu, Attili Lakshmi, Annapurna		19 August 1983
Patnam Vachhina Pasipapa (Tamil Dubbed Azhakia Kanne 1982)	J. Mahendran	Sri Gowri Lavanya Pictures	Ilaiyaraaja	Sarath Babu, Suhasini, Sumalatha, Baby Anju		5 November 1983
Pelli Chesi Choopistham	N. A. Pendyala Dialogues/Lyrics: Rajasri Negative rights: Allu Aravind	Sri Ramana Chitra	Ramakrishna Raja	Chandra Mohan, Vijaya Santhi, Chalam, Kaikala Satyanarayana, Allu Rama Lingaiah, Narayana Rao, Rajendra Prasad, Rama Prabha, Janaki,	(U) Comedy, Family Drama	22 July 1983
Pelli Choopulu	R. Narayana Murthy		K. V. Mahadevan	Chandra Mohan, Vijayashanti, Satyanarayana Kaikala	Romance, Comedy	
Penki Ghatam (Tamil Dubbed Iniayavaley Vaa)	N. C. Chakravarthi (Direction) A. Veerappan (Story/Screenplay) Dialogues: S. Vasanta Kumar) Lyrics: Gopi	Nagamohini Enterprises	Shyam & A. A. Raj	Radhika, Menaka, Mohan, Rajesh, Sachu, Venniradai, Y. G. Mahendra, Silk Smitha	(U) CBFC 16 May 1983	8 July 1983
Pichi Pantuulu	Maganti Venkateswara Rao	Jayabheri Art Movies	Chakravarthy	Murali Mohan, Madhavi, Kavitha, Kaikala Satyanarayana	Comedy	
Pidugu lanti Manishi (Tamil Dubbed (U))	M. A. Thirumugham Dialogues: Srichander Lyrics: Arudra Producer: Chamarthi Sakuntala	Janani Arts International	M. S. Viswanathan	Sivaji Ganesan, K. R. Vijaya, Geetha, Pushpalata	(U) CBFC not found	7 May 1983
Police Police (Tamil Dubbed Police Police – 29 July 1983)	Y. V. Gopikrishnan Story: Thuyavan Dialogues/Lyrics: Rajasri	J. K. Films	M. S. Viswanathan, B. Gopalam	Naresh Kumar, Silk Smitha, Sulakshana, Manorama	(A)	7 October 1983
Police Venkataswamy	Dasari Narayana Rao Lyrics: Kosaraju, Dasari, Dr. Cnare	Tarakeswari Creations	J. V. Raghavulu	Jayamalini, Gummadi Venkateswara Rao, Dasari Naryana Rao, Allu Rama Lingaiah, Chalapathi Rao, Dr. M. Prabhakar Reddy, Mamatha, Ranisubha, Suresh, Nirmala, Balaji Guest artists: Sobhan Babu, Gollapudi	(A)	9 September 1983
Poratam	Kodi Ramakrishna Lyrics: Rajasri, Atreya	S. R. Films	Chakravarthi	Krishna, Jayasudha, Sarada, Gollapudi, Anjali Devi, Naga Bhushanam	Action	9 December 1983
Praja Rajyam	M. Mallikarjuna Rao	Ratna Movies	J. V. Raghavulu	Mada, Krishna, Jaya Prada, Rao Gopala Rao, Dr. M. Prabhakara Reddy, Satyanarayana, Nutan Prasad		29 September 1983
Praja Shakthi	Navatharam Unit (Direction) Madhala Ranga Rao (Story/Screenplay) Dialogues: N. Rama Rao	Navatharam Pictures	Chakravarthy	Madhala Ranga Rao, P. J. Sarma, Narra Venkateswara Rao, Chalapathi Rao, Surekha, Prathibha	(A)	18 March 1983
Pralaya Gharjana	P. Chandrashekar Reddy	Sri Vani Chandra Combines	Raj – Koti	Mohan Babu, Swapna, Kavitha, Geetha, Vijaya Lalitha, Jeeva, Dr. M. Prabhakar Reddy, Sudhakar, Tyagaraju, Pandari Bai, Saradhi	(A)	14 January 1983
Prema Jwala	P. V. Raju (Story/Screenplay/Direction)	Bhimeswara Art Movies	Chakravarthy	Vijetha, Kamalakar, Nutan Prasad, Rajababu, Hema Sundhar, Gowri, Jhansi	(A) CBFC 8 June 1983	3 October 1983
Prema Pichollu	A. Kodandarami Reddy		Chakravarthy	Chiranjeevi, Radhika, Kavitha, Githa, Rao Gopala Rao, Gummadi, Allu Ramalingaiah, Sudhakar, Rajamouli, surya Kantham, Pushpalatha, Nirmala, Jayamalini, Varalakshmi	Romance, Drama (A)	14 January 1983
Prema Sagaram (Tamil Dubbed Nenjil Oru Ragam)	T. Rajendar (Story/Screenplay/Direction)	Vijaya Adhitya Creations	T. Rajendar	T. Rajendar, Saritha, Nalini		25 November 1983
Prema Vijayam	Nanduri Suribabu (Story/Direction) Dialogues/Lyrics: K.V.S. Prasad	Palnadu Art Movies	S. S Prakash	Srikrishna, Devisri, Sivaram Singh, Swapnapriya, D. Nageswara Rao, Kanaka Prasad, Subba Rao, D.N. Chowdary		3 October 1983
Puli Bebbuli	K. S. R. Das		Rajan–Nagendra	Chiranjeevi, Krishnam Raju, Jaya Prada		
Puli Debba	K. S. R. Das Dialogues: Adurti Narasimha Murthy Lyrics: Rajasri	PNR Pictures	Satyam	Silk Smitha, Naresh, Sarath Babu, Kanta Rao, Hem Chandar, Swapna Priya	(A)	
Raakasi Loya	V. Vidyasagar Reddy Dialogues: Parchuri Brothers Lyrics: Arudra, Dr. C. Narayana Reddy, Rajasri	Sri Amaleswari Films	Satyam	Rajesh, Naresh, Banuchander, Vijaya Santhi, Mucherla Aruna, Purnima, Deepa	(A)	9 September 1983
Raghu Ramudu	Kommineni	Saikrishna Enterprises	Chakravarthi	Sobhan Babu (Double Role), Sharada, Sumalatha, Ranganath, Nutan Prasad, Prasad Babu, Saradhi, Pandari Bai		10 February 1983
Rajakumar	G. Ramineedu Lyrics: Arudra, Atreya, Dasari, Dasam Gopala Krishna	Srinath Movies	Ilaiyaraaja	Sobhan Babu, Jaya Sudha, Sridevi, Ambika, Rao Gopala Rao, Janaki,		2 September 1983
Raju Rani Jocky	Singeetham Srinivasa Rao Dialogues: Gollapudi	Navatha Arts	Rajan–Nagendra	Chandra Mohan, Radhika	(A)	14 April 1983
Ramarajyamlo Bheemaraju	A. Kodandarami Reddy Lyrics: Veturi	Sri Rajya Lakshmi Art Pictures	Chakravarthi	Krishna, Sridevi, Rajendra Prasad	Action	28 July 1983
Ramudu Kadu Krishnudu	Dasari Narayana Rao			ANR, Jayasudha, Radhika	Drama	25 March 1983
Rangula Kala	B. Narsing Rao		B. Narsing Rao	B. Narsing Rao, Sai Chand, Rupa, Gadhar		
Rangula Puli	Kodi Rama Krishna (Story/Screenplay/Direction)	Viswa Chitra Combines	Chakravarthi	Mohan Babu, Sumalatha,	Drama (A)	17 June 1983
Rendu Jella Sita	Jandhyala Lyrics: Veturi, Indraganti	Sri Bramarambika Films	Ramesh Naidu	Naresh, Mahalakshmi, Pushpalatha, Rajesh, Pradeep, Subhakar, Suthivelu, Srilakshmi, Suthi Verabhadra Rao, Rallapalli, Allu Rama Lingaiah, Sakshi Ranga Rao, Devi	Comedy	31 March 1983
Roshagadu	K. S. R. Das Lyrics: Rajasri	P. N. R. Pictures	Satyam	Chiranjeevi, Madhavi, Tiger Prabhakar	Action	29 July 1983
Rudrakali	Dasari Narayan Rao Lyrics: Rajasri, Dasari	Telugu Chitra Combines	Satyam	Chandra Mohan, Jaya Mala, Sarath Babu, Dr. M. Prabhakar Reddy, etc.		19 November 1983
Sagara Sangamam	K. Vishwanath Lyrics: Veturi	Poornodaya Movie Creations	Ilaiyaraaja	Kamal Haasan, Jaya Prada, Sharath Babu	Drama	3 June 1983
Sangharshana	K. Murali Mohana Rao Lyrics: Veturi, Atreya	Suresh Productions	Chakravarthi	Chiranjeevi, Vijayashanti, Prabhakar Reddy	Action	29 December 1983
Shakthi	K. Raghavendra Rao Lyrics: Atreya, Arudra, Veturi	Gopi Movies	Chakravarthi	Krishna, Jaya Sudha, Radha	Action	2 September 1983
Simham Navvindi	D. Yoganand	Ramakrishna Cine Studios	Chakravarthi	N. T. Rama Rao, Nandamuri Balakrishna, Kala Ranjani, Rallapalli, Allu Rama Laingaiah, Nutan Prasad		3 March 1983
Simhamtho Chelagatam						
Simhapuri Simham	Kodi Ramakrishna (Story/Screenplay/Direction) Dialogues: Gollapudi Lyrics: Dr. C. Narayana Reddy, Rajasri	Vijaya Sai Films	J. V. Raghavulu	Chiranjeevi, Madhavi, Radhika, Gollapudi Maruti Rao, Kaikala Satyanarayana, Rao Gopala Rao, P.L Narayana, Rallapalli,	Comedy	20 October 1983
Siripuram Monagadu	K. S. R. Das		Raj–Koti	Krishna, Jaya Prada, K. R. Vijaya, Nutan Prasad	Action	
Sivudu Sivudu Sivudu	A. Kodandarami Reddy Dialogues: Satyanand	Kranthi Chitra	Chakravathi	Chiranjeevi, Radhika, Jaggayya, Rao Gopal Rao, Giri Babu,	Action	6 June 1983
Sri Ranga Neethulu	A. Kodandarami Reddy		Satyam	Akkineni Nageswara Rao, Sridevi, Satyanarayana Kaikala	Comedy	
Subha Muhurtham						
Swarajyam	Biram Masthan Rao (Direction) Story/Dialogues: Madhala Ranga Rao Lyrics: SriSri, Adrushtadeepak Playback: Chakravarthy, Ramesh, Baburao, Srinivas	Navatharam Pictures	Chakravarthi	Chakravarthy(Composer), Madhala Ranga Rao	(A)	5 August 1983
Thodu Needa						
Triveni Sangamam	Kommineni Krishnamurthy Dialogues: Kopella Viswam Lyrics: Dr. Cnare	Pratap Art Productions	J. V. Raghavulu	Suman, Vanitasri, Sitara, Gollapudi		12 November 1983
Vetagadi Vijayam (Tamil Dubbed)	M. A. Thirumugam Dialogues: SriSri	Mamata Chitra	K. V. Mahadevan	M. G. Rama Chandran, Savitri	Action	
Vimukthi Kosam	Udaya Kumar Story/Dialogues: Bhushanam Lyrics: Vangapandu Prasada Rao	Praja Chitra Productions	B. Gopalam	Saichand, Kakarala, Phani, Padma, Chalapathirao, Garagara Mitai Chitti, Jayamala	(A)	23 December 1983

== Dubbed films ==
Released date	Title	Director	Original film		Cast	Ref.
Released date	Title	Director	Title	Language	Cast	Ref.
28 January	Viplava Jyoth	A. Vincent	Naam Pirandha Mann	Tamil	Sivaji Ganesan, K. R. Vijaya, Kamal Haasan, Fatafat Jayalaxmi, Nagesh	
18 February	Snehabhishekam	Muktha Srinivasan	Simla Special	Tamil	Kamal Haasan, Sripriya, S. Ve. Shekher, Y. G. Mahendra, Manorama, Thengai Srinivasan, Santhi Krishna, Vanitha	
23 March	Ragamalika	Bharathiraja	Kaadhal Oviyam	Tamil	Kannan, Radha, Archana, Janagaraj	
23 July	Alludugari Agachatlu	C. V. Rajendran	Lottery Ticket	Tamil	Mohan, Suhasini, Silk Smitha	
25 August	Akhanda Sowbhagyavathi	Shantilal Soni	Nagin Aur Suhagin	Hindi	Vijay Arora Rita Bhaduri, Lakshmi Chaya, C. S. Dubey, Jairaj, Kalpana Dewan, Mahesh Desai, Babu Raje	
17 September	Urumulu Merupulu	K. Satyanarayana	Minchina Belakalli	Kannada	Ashok, Dinesh, Prince, Vani, S. Shivam, Shakti Prasad, T. R. Narasimha Raju	
9 December	Sri Krishna Charitra	A. P. Nagarajan	Sri Krishna Leela (1977 film)	Tamil	Sivakumar, Jayalalitha, Srividya, T. R. Mahalingam, Major Sundarrajan, C. R. Vijayakumari	
