= Tharaka Prabhu Films =

- Company type: Private
- Industry: Entertainment
- Founded: Hyderabad in 1977
- Headquarters: Hyderabad, India
- Key people: Dasari Narayana Rao
- Products: Films Tollywood
- Owner: Dasari Narayana Rao, Dasari Padma Rao

Tharaka Prabhu Films is an Indian film production company based out of Hyderabad. Established in 1977 by veteran actor, director Dasari Narayana Rao and Dasari Padma, the production house has produced several movies in the Tollywood Film Industry.

== Film production ==
Year	Film	Language	Actors	Director	Notes
1978	Sivaranjani	Telugu	Jayasudha, Hari Prasad, Mohan Babu, Allu Ramalingaiah, Nirmalamma, Subhashini, Murali Mohan	Dasari Narayana Rao	
1982	Meghasandesam	Telugu	Akkineni Nageswara Rao, Jayasudha, Jaya Prada, Jaggayya	Dasari Narayana Rao	The film got critical acclaim at the 9th International Film Festival of India, 1983 Cannes Film Festival and Moscow film festivals. The film has won four National Film Awards.
1983	Bahudurapu Batasari	Telugu	Akkineni Nageswara Rao, Sharada	Dasari Narayana Rao	
1984	Justice Chkravarthi	Telugu	Akkineni Nageshwara Rao, Sujatha, Suhasini	Dasari Narayana Rao	
1985	Pelli Meeku Akshintalu Naaku	Telugu	Ganesh Babu, Dasari Narayana Rao, Jayasudha	Dasari Narayana Rao	
1986	Ugra Narsimham	Telugu	Krishnam Raju, Jaya Prada, Mohan Babu	Dasari Narayana Rao	
1987	Majnu	Telugu	Nagarjuna, Rajani, Moon Moon Sen	Dasari Narayana Rao	The film recorded as 'Super Hit' at box-office.
1987	Atma Bandhuvulu	Telugu	Akkineni Nageshwara Rao, Jayasudha, Narayana Rao Dasari	Dasari Narayana Rao	
1988	Intinti Bhagavatam	Telugu	Mohan Babu	Dasari Narayana Rao	
1993	Akka Pettanam Chelleli Kapuram	Telugu	Aparna, Jayasudha, Srikanya	Dasari Narayana Rao	
2014	Erra Bus	Telugu	Vishnu Manchu, Catherine Tresa, Dasari Narayana Rao	Dasari Narayana Rao	
