= Sorgam Naragam =

- Theatrical release poster
- Directed by: R. Thyagarajan
- Screenplay by: Sandow M. M. A. Chinnappa Thevar
- Dialogue by: Ma. Ra.
- Based on: Swargam Narakam by Dasari Narayana Rao
- Produced by: Sandow M. M. A. Chinnappa Thevar
- Starring: Sivakumar; Fatafat Jayalaxmi; Vijayakumar; Padmapriya
- Cinematography: V. Ramamoorthy
- Edited by: M. G. Balu Rao
- Music by: Shankar–Ganesh
- Production company: Dhandayudhapani Films
- Release date: 29 July 1977
- Country: India
- Language: Tamil

Sorgam Naragam (transl. Heaven and hell) is a 1977 Indian Tamil-language film directed by R. Thyagarajan and produced by Sandow M. M. A. Chinnappa Thevar, who also wrote the screenplay. It is a remake of the 1975 Telugu film Swargam Narakam. The film stars Sivakumar, Fatafat Jayalaxmi, Vijayakumar and Padmapriya. It was released on 29 July 1977 and did not perform well at the box office.

== Cast ==
- Sivakumar
- Fatafat Jayalaxmi
- Vijayakumar
- Padmapriya
- Nagesh
- Major Sundarrajan
- Thengai Srinivasan

== Production ==
Sivakumar and Vijayakumar, who last acted together in Ponnukku Thanga Manasu (1973), reunited for this film. It was colourised via Eastmancolor.

== Soundtrack ==
The music was composed by Shankar–Ganesh, with lyrics by Kannadasan. Sivakumar told Thevar that there should be a song where the protagonist sings to himself about the misery of having a good wife but a hellish life. Thevar and Sivakumar then told Kannadasan that they wanted a song to explain how a loving wife loved her husband too much, fuelling doubts which ruined their lives. This led to the creation of the song "Thanneerai Neruppu Enru".

Track listing
No.	Title	Singer(s)	Length
1.	"Poovum Pottum"	T. M. Soundararajan, P. Susheela
2.	"Irandu Kiligal"	P. Susheela
3.	"Mallu Vetti"	T. M. Soundararajan, P. Susheela
4.	"Thanneerai Neruppu Enru"	T. M. Soundararajan

== Release and reception ==
Sorgam Naragam was released on 29 July 1977. Naagai Dharuman of Anna praised the cast performances, dialogues by Ma. Ra., and cinematography by V. Ramamoorthy.
