= Hamlet (1954 film) =

1954 Indian film by Kishore Sahu

- Screen shot of Kishore Sahu as Hamlet
- Directed by: Kishore Sahu
- Written by: Shakespeare; Kishore Sahu (screenplay)
- Produced by: Kishore Sahu
- Starring: Kishore Sahu; Mala Sinha; Venus Bannerjee
- Cinematography: K. H. Kapadia
- Edited by: Kantilal B. Shukla
- Music by: Ramesh Naidu
- Production company: Hindustan Chitra
- Release date: 1954
- Running time: 79 minutes
- Country: India
- Language: Hindi

Hamlet (Urdu: हेमलेट) is a 1954 Hindi tragedy drama film, produced and directed by Kishore Sahu. The film was a free adaptation of Shakespeare's tragedy, with Sahu playing Hamlet as well as writing the screenplay, while the dialogue was by Amanat Hilal and B. D. Verma. It was produced by Hindustan Chitra, a production company started by Sahu in 1944. It was Ramesh Naidu's first film as a music composer. The film starred Mala Sinha, Kishore Sahu, Venus Banerji, Kamaljeet and Jankidas.

Sahu was influenced by "classic European sources". Though termed a "free adaptation" in the credit roll of the film, Sahu's Hamlet stayed true to the title, its setting and the original names in the play, remaining as close as possible to Laurence Olivier's Hamlet film (1948).

== Plot ==
After seeing his father's ghost the film follows the play focusing on Hamlet's revenge on his Uncle Claudius, who has married his mother Gertrude after murdering Hamlet's father. He pretends to be insane and is in the process of staging a play where he plans to denounce his mother and Uncle.

== Cast ==
- Kishore Sahu as Hamlet
- Mala Sinha as Ophelia
- Venus Banejee
- S. Nazir as Polonius
- Kamaljeet as Laertes
- Jankidas as Osric
- Shreenath as Horatio
- Rajan Kapoor
- Hiralal as Claudius
- Paul Sharma
- Haroon

== Production ==
There were several plot changes, with Ophelia telling her part in flashback and singing songs with friends, while the gravediggers were "used for comic effect", thus giving in to Indian film-goers sensibilities. The film took its inspiration from the Parsi theatre days, with Sahu's monologue inculcating couplets from famous Indian poets and using parts of dialogues from Ahsan's Khoon-Nahak (1928). Ophelia sang Bahadur Shah Zafar's "Na Kisi Ki Ankh Ka Noor Hoon" and a dying Hamlet quoted Zauq's "Layee Hayaat Aaye, Qaza Le Chali Chale".

The "Parsi theatre tradition", which gave rise to several freely adapted Hindi films from Shakespeare including Modi's Khoon Ka Khoon (1935), Akhtar Hussain's Romeo and Juliet (1947) and Cleopatra (1950), came to an end with Hamlet.

== Reception ==
The film did "reasonably well" at the box office. Acclaimed by the Filmfare critic, it was panned harshly by Filmindia, which called it a "slander" to Shakespeare. According to Manju Jain, Sybil Thorndike, who was present at the premiere of the film in Bombay, thought that Gertrude was "magnificent".

== Other Indian Hamlet adaptations ==
- Khoon-E-Nahak (Murder Most Foul) (1928) was the first Hindi film adaptation, directed by Dada Athawale and written by Mehdi Hassan Ahsan.
- Khoon Ka Khoon (Hamlet) (1935), directed by Sohrab Modi, had Modi playing Hamlet with Naseem Banu as Ophelia and Naseem's mother Shamshadbai as Gertrude.
- Hamlet (1954) by Kishore Sahu was the closest to the original play, and is cited as the "most noted adaptation".
- Haider (2014) is an adaptation set against the Kashmir conflict and directed by Vishal Bhardawaj.

== Soundtrack ==
Ramesh Naidu was the debutant music director. He went on to score music for Telugu films in the 1970s, the most popular being Meghasandesam (1983), for which he won the National Film Award for Best Music Direction. The lyrics were written by Hasrat Jaipuri, while the playback singing was provided by Asha Bhosle, Mohammed Rafi and Jagmohan Bakshi.

=== Songlist ===
Title	Singer
"Ankhon Mein Pyar Mere Diwana Haal Mera"	Asha Bhosle
"Aa Jao Mere Pyare Arman Tujhko Pukare"	Asha Bhosle
"Chahe Sataye Wo Chahe Rulaye"	Asha Bhosle
"Sitamgar Kya Maza Paya Bata To Dil"	Asha Bhosle
"Ghir Ghir Aaye Badarwa O Bhaiya"	Mohammed Rafi, Jagmohan Bakshi
