= Prema Mandiram =

- Theatrical release poster
- Directed by: Dasari Narayana Rao
- Written by: Dasari Narayana Rao
- Produced by: D. Ramanaidu
- Starring: Akkineni Nageswara Rao; Jaya Prada
- Cinematography: P. S. Selvaraj
- Edited by: K. A. Marthand
- Music by: K. V. Mahadevan
- Production company: Suresh Productions
- Release date: 19 September 1981
- Running time: 160 mins
- Country: India
- Language: Telugu

Prema Mandiram (transl. Temple of Love) is a 1981 Indian Telugu-language drama film, produced by D. Ramanaidu under the Suresh Productions banner and directed by Dasari Narayana Rao. It stars Akkineni Nageswara Rao and Jaya Prada, with music composed by K. V. Mahadevan.

== Cast ==
Soure

- Akkineni Nageswara Rao as Pedababu Sarvarayudu & Chinnababu (dual role)
- Jaya Prada as Madhura Ranjani
- Gummadi as Bhupati Raja
- Jaggayya as Vikram
- Satyanarayana as Diwanji
- Allu Ramalingaiah as Aachary
- Sridhar as Madhura's brother
- Nagesh as Lavakusalu
- Chalam as Lavakusalu
- Sarathi as Servant
- Balakrishna as Servant
- P. J. Sarma as Britisher
- Ambika as Hema
- Geetha as Vikram 's wife
- Suryakantam as Anya Ranjani
- Rajasulochana as Sabha Ranjani
- Rama Prabha as Madhura Vani
- Nirmalamma as Raja Ranjani
- D. Ramanaidu as Doctor

== Crew ==
- Art: S. Krishna Rao
- Choreography: Saleem
- Lyrics: C. Narayana Reddy, Aarudhra, Veturi, Dasari Narayana Rao
- Playback: S. P. Balasubrahmanyam, P. Susheela, S. Janaki
- Music: K. V. Mahadevan
- Editing: K. A. Marthand
- Cinematography: P. S. Selvaraj
- Producer: D. Ramanaidu
- Story - Screenplay - Dialogues - Director: Dasari Narayana Rao
- Banner: Suresh Productions
- Release Date: 19 September 1981

== Soundtrack ==
Prema Mandiram

Film score by K. V. Mahadevan
- Released: 1981
- Genre: Soundtrack
- Length: 38:45
- Label: SEA Records
- Producer: K. V. Mahadevan

K. V. Mahadevan chronology
Guru Sishyulu (1981)	Prema Mandiram (1981)	Radha Kalyanam (1981)

Music composed by K. V. Mahadevan. Music released on SEA Records Audio Company.

S.No	Song title	Lyrics	Singers	length
1	"Prema Mandiram Ide"	Veturi	S. P. Balasubrahmanyam, P. Susheela	4:32
2	"Chandrodayam"	Veturi	S. P. Balasubrahmanyam, P. Susheela	4:03
3	"Ekkado Chusinattu Unnadi"	Aarudhra	S. P. Balasubrahmanyam, P. Susheela	4:35
4	"Aata Tandana Tana"	Veturi	S. P. Balasubrahmanyam, S. Janaki	4:12
5	"Tholisari Palikenu"	C. Narayana Reddy	S. P. Balasubrahmanyam	5:33
6	"Udayama Udayinchaku"	C. Narayana Reddy	S. P. Balasubrahmanyam	4:23
7	"Amaram Amaram"	Dasari Narayana Rao	S. P. Balasubrahmanyam	5:47
8	"Maa Inti Alluda"	Veturi	S. Janaki, P. Susheela	5:40

== Others ==
- VCDs and DVDs on - VOLGA Videos, Hyderabad
