= Pichodi Chetilo Raayi =

- Official poster
- Directed by: Dasari Narayana Rao
- Written by: Dasari Narayana Rao; Sanjeevi (dialogues)
- Produced by: Dasari Narayana Rao
- Starring: Dasari Narayana Rao
- Music by: Vandemataram Srinivas
- Production company: Dasari Communications
- Release date: 27 August 1999
- Country: India
- Language: Telugu

Pichodi Chetilo Raayi is a 1999 Indian Telugu-language political satire film directed by Dasari Narayana Rao and starring himself.

== Cast ==
- Dasari Narayana Rao as Sri Krishna Devaraya
- Charan Raj as Chakradhara Rao
- Captain Raju as Maharadhi
- Chandra Mohan
- Suthi Velu
- A.V.S.
- Sujatha
- Brahmaji
- Indraja
- Sri Lakshmi

== Production ==
The filming was completed within 32 days.

== Reception ==
A critic from Sify opined that "On the whole, the film is a crude and vain attempt at criticising the present administration". Jeevi of Idlebrain.com said that "This film ends with a message that the vote should not become 'pichivadi chetilo raayi'".

== Awards ==
AP Cinegoer Awards

- Best Comedy Actress - Sri Lakshmi
