= Aaj Ka M.L.A. Ram Avtar =

1984 film by Dasari Narayana Rao

Aaj Kaa M.L.A Ram Avtar
- Directed by: Dasari Narayana Rao
- Written by: Dasari Narayana Rao; Rahi Masoom Reza (dialogues)
- Based on: MLA Yedukondalu by Dasari Narayana Rao
- Produced by: Kranthi Kumar
- Starring: Rajesh Khanna; Shabana Azmi; Shatrughan Sinha
- Cinematography: K. S. Hari
- Edited by: B. Krishnam Raju
- Music by: Bappi Lahiri
- Production company: Sri Annapurna International
- Release date: 23 March 1984
- Country: India
- Language: Hindi

Aaj Kaa M.L.A Ram Avtar (transl. Today's MLA Ram Avtar) is a 1984 political satire film starring Rajesh Khanna. It was a remake of 1983 Telugu language film MLA Yedukondalu. The film was appreciated by critics, especially Khanna's performance, but failed to impress the box-office.

== Plot ==
Ram Avtar works as a widowed barber in a small village and lives with his second wife, Sushma, who looks after him and his kids. Ram Avtar also personally grooms Minister Digvijay Singh. When Digvijay's political party is in need of someone to stand in the forthcoming election, Digvijay recommends Ram Avtar as his choice. This chance is grabbed by Ram Avtar and he wins the elections and becomes a big politician. Sushma watches the changes in his life from the sidelines.

== Cast ==
- Rajesh Khanna as Ram Avtar
- Shabana Azmi as Sushma
- Shatrughan Sinha as Kranti Kumar
- Asrani as Bhajanlal
- Satyen Kappu as Digvijay Singh
- A. K. Hangal as Balmukund Tripathi
- Madan Puri as Makhanlal Kesari
- Om Shivpuri as Gaurishankar
- Shubha Khote as Mrs. Bhajanlal
- Deven Verma as Digvijay's PA
- Huma Khan as Bhajanlal's Daughter
- Chitti Babu

== Soundtrack ==
Lyrics: Indeevar

Song	Singer
"Tirupati Balaji"	Kishore Kumar
"Shri Ram Avtar"	Kishore Kumar
"Tukur Tukur Dekha Karoon, Tukur Tukur Dekha Karoon"	Kishore Kumar, Asha Bhosle
"Jaago Re Jaago, Shuru Ho Gayi Hai Aaj Jung Hamari"	Mahendra Kapoor, Asha Bhosle
"Woh Jo Bichhde Hai"	Asha Bhosle
"Chalo Calcutta, Chalo Calcutta"	Bappi Lahiri, Sharon Prabhakar

== Reception ==
The Hindu in its review of the film wrote on Rajesh Khanna's performance, "Like most of his works, it also keeps you engaged with its pulsating heart and potent dialogues. In his climactic speech, Ram Avtar brings out what ails Indian democracy. When he says that those who sell their votes are equally corrupt as those who buy them, it rings a bell. When he points out that Indian public usually claps for bombastic speeches and unrealistic promises, it seems he is addressing aaj ka (today's) voter.
