= Swargam Narakam =

1975 film

- Poster
- Directed by: Dasari Narayana Rao
- Produced by: M. K. Mavulayya; P. S. Bhaskara Rao
- Starring: Mohan Babu; Annapoorna; Dasari Narayana Rao; Jayalakshmi
- Music by: Satyam
- Release date: 22 November 1975
- Country: India
- Language: Telugu

Swargam Narakam (transl. Heaven and Hell) is a 1975 Telugu-language romantic drama film written and directed by Dasari Narayana Rao. The debut film for Mohan Babu, Annapoorna, and Jeeva, it was later remade in Hindi as Swarg Narak (1978) and in Tamil as Sorgam Naragam (1977). The film won the Nandi Award for Best Feature Film.

== Plot ==
The plot revolves around three couples. The first couple is that of Acharya (Dasari Narayana Rao), who always takes advantage of others' mistakes and position and earns money, and his wife Mary. Annapurna (Annapoorna) and playboy Mohan (Mohan Babu) are the second couple, while the jealous and possessive Jaya (Jayalakshmi) and Vikram (Eswara Rao) are the third one.

The first couple is happily married. The second couple stays with Mohan's mother. Mohan spends a lot of time attending late night parties, while Annapurna patiently awaits her husband every night. Once Jaya happens to see Vicky with Radha, assumes they are having an affair and pesters Vicky about it. When Vicky denies it, she leaves him. On the other hand, Mohan decides to leave the house, but destiny plays its role. He meets with an accident and during his recovery period, Annapurna proves how important she is for him. He repents and completely changes into a new soft-spoken and good man. On the other hand, Jaya spoils her own house to such a state that Vicky is compelled to leave his house after Radha's tragic suicide. At this juncture, Acharya steps in to mend the couple. Some of the events that follow is a hilarious sequence. Whether Acharya is successful in mending these couples forms the rest of the story.

== Cast ==
- Mohan Babu as Mohan
- Annapoorna as Annapoorna
- Dasari Narayana Rao as S. K. Acharya
- Jayalakshmi as Jayalakshmi
- Eswara Rao as Vikram
- Jeeva

== Production ==
This film marked the debut of Jeeva, who was not the original choice for the role.

== Soundtrack ==
- "Mantallo Mantallo" (Lyrics: C. Narayana Reddy; Singer: S. P. Balasubrahmanyam)

== Awards ==
- The film won Nandi Award for Third Best Feature Film - Bronze (1975)
