= Rayudugaru Nayudugaru =

- Directed by: Dasari Narayana Rao
- Written by: Thotapalli Madhu (dialogues)
- Screenplay by: Dasari Narayana Rao
- Story by: Saranga Ramesh
- Produced by: Dasari Narayana Rao
- Starring: Akkineni Nageswara Rao; Dasari Narayana Rao; Vinod Kumar Alva; Roja
- Cinematography: Ch. Ramana Raju
- Edited by: B. Krishnam Raju
- Music by: M. M. Keeravani
- Production company: Dasari Film University
- Release date: 12 June 1996
- Running time: 143 minutes
- Country: India
- Language: Telugu

Rayudugaru Nayudugaru is a 1996 Telugu-language action-drama film, produced and directed by Dasari Narayana Rao under the Dasari Film University banner. It stars Akkineni Nageswara Rao, Dasari Narayana Rao, Vinod Kumar Alva and Roja, with music composed by M. M. Keeravani.

== Cast ==
- Akkineni Nageswara Rao as Rayudu / Gudavalli Sarva Rayudu
- Dasari Narayana Rao as Nayudu / Addamala Rangaiah Nayudu
- Vinod Kumar Alva as Ramudu / Sivaramakrishna Prasad
- Roja as Malli / Malleswari, Rayudu's Daughter
- Satyanarayana as Veera Swamy
- Srihari as Satyam Nayudu
- Babu Mohan as Gongali
- A.V.S
- Rallapalli as Chebrolu
- Chalapathi Rao as Munusabu
- Narra Venkateswara Rao as Mavullaiah
- Jayasudha as Parvathi
- Sujatha as Lakshmi, Nayudu's wife
- Jayanthi as Veera Swamy's wife
- Ravali
- Narra Venkateswara Rao
- Annuja
- Master Baladitya as Bulli Rayudu

== Soundtrack ==
Rayudugaru Nayudugaru

Film score by M. M. Keeravani
- Released: 1996
- Genre: Soundtrack
- Length: 28:28
- Label: Supreme Music
- Producer: M. M. Keeravani

M. M. Keeravani chronology
| Is Raat Ki Subah Nahin (1996) | Rayudugaru Nayudugaru (1996) | Appaji (1996) |

Music composed by M. M. Keeravani. Music released on Supreme Music Company.

| No. | Title | Lyrics | Singer(s) | Length |
|---|---|---|---|---|
| 1. | "Naa Kantiki Chupuvu" | Bhuvana Chandra | Mano, M. M. Keeravani, Swarnalatha | 4:57 |
| 2. | "Ee Mandarala Thotalo" | Suddala Ashok Teja | S. P. Balasubrahmanyam, K. S. Chithra | 4:43 |
| 3. | "Sigga Nee Illekada" | Bhuvana Chandra | M. M. Keeravani, Sindhu | 4:52 |
| 4. | "Aaku Pacha Chandamama" | Suddala Ashokteja | K. S. Chithra | 4:52 |
| 5. | "Gadapalo Kudipadametti" | Suddala Ashok Teja | S. P. Balasubrahmanyam, Sujatha | 3:55 |
| 6. | "Monna Chupu Kalisindi" | Bhuvana Chandra | Mano, Sindhu | 5:09 |
| Total length: | | | | 28:28 |
