= Mehndi Rang Layegi =

- Theatrical release poster
- Directed by: Dasari Narayana Rao
- Written by: Dr. Rahi Masoom Reza (dialogues); Anjaan; Dr. Hariram Acharya (lyrics)
- Screenplay by: Dasari Narayana Rao
- Story by: K. Ramalakshmi novel 'Raavudu' and Muppalla Ranganayakamma novel 'Ide naa nyayam'
- Based on: Gorintaku (1979)
- Produced by: Pradeep Sharma; Veer Jain
- Starring: Jeetendra; Rekha; Anita Raj
- Cinematography: M. Kannappa
- Edited by: D. Raja Gopal
- Music by: Laxmikant–Pyarelal
- Production company: Tutu Veer Films
- Release date: 9 July 1982
- Running time: 132 min
- Country: India
- Language: Hindi

Mehndi Rang Layegi (transl. Henna brings Colour) is a 1982 Indian Hindi-language romance film, produced by Pradeep Sharma and Veer Jain under the Tutu Veer Films banner and directed by Dasari Narayana Rao. It stars Jeetendra, Rekha, Anita Raj and music composed by Laxmikant–Pyarelal. The film is a remake of the Telugu film Gorintaku (1979).

== Plot ==
Ramu's father is a drunkard, who neglects his family. His daughter dies after he beats her once, and Ramu (Jeetendra) runs away from home.

Kalpana is married off to Anand, a London-based doctor. Kalpana discovers he is already married. Ramu treats Padma (Anita Raaj) and a warm friendship develops. A love triangle ensues, with Kalpana finally sacrificing her love and Ramu and Padma coming together.

== Cast ==
- Ashok Kumar
- Jeetendra as Ramu
- Rekha as Kalpana
- Anita Raj as Padma
- Mazhar Khan as Anand
- Kader Khan
- Asrani
- Sharada
- Aruna Irani
- Sudhir Dalvi
- Ashalata Wabgaonkar
- Kumar Aditya
- Sarla Yeolekar
- Nandita
- Aradhana

== Soundtrack ==
Music: Laxmikant-Pyarelal Lyrics: Anjaan & Dr. Hariram Acharya

Song	Singer	Lyricist
"Aankh Milti Hai To"	Kishore Kumar, Asha Bhosle	Anjaan
"Chaman Ke Saath"	Lata Mangeshkar	Dr. Hariram Acharya
"Heer Sohni Shirin Laila"	Asha Bhosle	Anjaan
"Koi Jaane Ya Na Jaane"	Suresh Wadkar, Anuradha Paudwal	Anjaan
"Paas Aate Rahen"	Shabbir Kumar	Anjaan
"Mehandi To Mehandi Hai"	Lata Mangeshkar	Dr. Hariram Acharya
"Mehandi To Mehandi Hai"	Suresh Wadkar	Dr. Hariram Acharya
"Mehandi To Mehandi Hai"	Lata Mangeshkar	Dr. Hariram Acharya
