= Nandi Award for Best Actor =

Annual film award

- Awarded for: Best Performance by an actor in a leading role in Telugu cinema
- Sponsored by: Government of Andhra Pradesh
- Rewards: "Silver Nandi", "Sri Rajendra Prasad Gold Medal", cash award and a commendation certificate
- First award: 1977
- Final award: 2016
- Most recent winner: N. T. Rama Rao Jr. for the films Nannaku Prematho and Janatha Garage

Highlights
- Most wins: Venkatesh (5 awards); Mahesh Babu (4 awards)
- Total awarded: 40
- First winner: Krishnam Raju

The Nandi Award for Best Actor was commissioned by the Nandi Awards committee in 1977. The winner is awarded a "Silver Nandi", a gold medal, cash award and a commendation certificate. Venkatesh has won the most Best Actor awards, with five wins, followed by Mahesh Babu with four wins.

== Winners ==
List of winners of Nandi Awards for Best Actor
- Artist: Wins
Venkatesh	5
Mahesh Babu	4
Chiranjeevi	3
Balakrishna	3
Nagarjuna	3
Kamal Haasan	3
Jagapati Babu	2
Krishnam Raju	2
Dasari Narayana Rao	2
Rajendra Prasad	2
M. Prabhakar Reddy	2
Ravi Teja	1
Prabhas	1
Nani	1
N.T. Rama Rao Jr	1

Year	Actor	Role	Film	Ref.
2016	N. T. Rama Rao Jr.	• Abhiram • Anand	• Nannaku Prematho • Janatha Garage	
2015	Mahesh Babu	Harsha Vardhan	Srimanthudu	
2014	Balakrishna	Jaidev / Krishna	Legend	
2013	Prabhas	Jai	Mirchi	
2012	Nani	Varun Krishna	Yeto Vellipoyindhi Manasu	
2011	Mahesh Babu	Ajay	Dookudu	
2010	Balakrishna	Srimannarayana / Dr. Narasimha	Simha	
2009	Dasari Narayana Rao	Palakollu	Mestri	
2008	Ravi Teja	Ravi	Neninthe	
2007	Venkatesh	Ganesh	Aadavari Matalaku Ardhalu Verule	
2006	Nagarjuna	Bhadrachala Ramadasu	Sri Ramadasu	
2005	Mahesh Babu	Nanda Gopal (Nandu) / Pardhu	Athadu	
2004	Rajendra Prasad	Raghuramayya	Aa Naluguru	
2003	Mahesh Babu	G. Seetaram	Nijam	
2002 †	• Chiranjeevi • Nagarjuna	• Indrasena Reddy / Shankar Narayana • Karthik	• Indra • Santosham	
2001	Balakrishna	Narasimha	Narasimha Naidu	
2000	Jagapati Babu	Anand Babu	Manoharam	
1999	Venkatesh	Raghu	Kalisundam Raa	
1998	Venkatesh	Ganesh	Ganesh	
1997	Nagarjuna	Annamacharya	Annamayya	
1996	Jagapati Babu	Madhu	Maavichiguru	
1995	Venkatesh	Rakesh	Dharma Chakram	
1994	Akkineni Nageswara Rao	Srinivasa Rao	Bangaru Kutumbam	
1993	Suman	Raju	Bava Bavamaridi	
1992	Chiranjeevi	Madhava	Aapathbandhavudu	
1991	Dasari Narayana Rao	Satteyya	Mamagaaru	
1990	Rajendra Prasad	Ramudu	Yerra Mandaram	
1989	Kamal Haasan	G.K. Rayudu/Chandram	Indrudu Chandrudu	
1988	Venkatesh	Pruthvi	Prema	
1987	Chiranjeevi	Sambayya	Swayam Krushi	
1986	Kamal Haasan	Sivayya	Swathi Muthyam	
1985	Murali Mohan	Ramachandra	O Thandri Theerpu	
1984	Krishnam Raju	Brahmanna/Ravi	Bobbili Brahmanna	
1983	Kamal Haasan	Balakrishna	Saagara Sangamam	
1982	Akkineni Nageswara Rao	Ravindra Babu	Meghasandesam	
1981	M. Prabhakar Reddy		Palle Pilichindi	
1980	M. Prabhakar Reddy		Yuvatharam Kadilindi	
1979	Gokina Rama Rao	Sarpanch Raghuramayya	Punadhirallu	
1978	Hema Sunder	Parvateesam	Naalaga Endaro	
1977	Krishnam Raju	Hari/Krishna	Amaradeepam	

== See also ==
- Nandi Awards
