= Mamagaru =

- Directed by: Muthyala Subbaiah
- Written by: Thotapalli Madhu (dialogues)
- Screenplay by: Muthyala Subbaiah
- Story by: V. Sekhar
- Based on: Naan Pudicha Mappillai (Tamil)
- Produced by: A. Mohan; C. M. Krishna
- Starring: Dasari Narayana Rao; Vinod Kumar Alva; Yamuna; Aishwarya
- Music by: Raj–Koti
- Distributed by: M. M. Movie Arts
- Release date: 30 August 1991
- Running time: 158 min
- Country: India
- Language: Telugu

Mamagaru (transl. Respectable uncle) is a 1991 Telugu-language drama film directed by Muthyala Subbaiah. It stars Dasari Narayana Rao, Vinod Kumar Alva, Aishwarya and Yamuna in the main roles. The film is a remake of the Tamil film Naan Pudicha Mappillai.

== Plot ==
Vijay (Vinod Kumar Alva) is the president of a village. He rescues the simple Satheyya (Dasari Narayana Rao) from an attack by thieves. Vijay later marries Satheyya's daughter Lakshmi (Yamuna) against the parental wishes of Kanthamma (Nirmalamma), who wants him to marry his niece Rani (Aishwarya). Vijay also brings his father-in-law to live with him. These decisions anger his brother-in-law Pothuraju (Kota Srinivasa Rao), who plots to discredit Vijay's family. Lakshmi accidentally dies in a bomb explosion which was planted to make a ditch. Satheyya feels sad that his son-in-law could not forget his daughter. He persuades him to marry Rani. Rani also admires him because of his simplicity and love. But Puthuraju is not happy about all the attention he gets. Satheyya is driven out of Vijay's house after Pothuraju accuses the old man of being a womaniser. Vijay finally sees through Pothuraju's evil designs, but not before Satheyya commits suicide.

== Cast ==
- Dasari Narayana Rao as Satteyya
- Vinod Kumar Alva as Vijay Kumar
- Yamuna as Lakshmi
- Aishwarya as Rani
- Annapoorna as Vijay's elder sister
- Nirmalamma as Kantamma
- Kota Srinivasa Rao as Poturaju
- Babu Mohan as beggar

== Production ==
Mohan who saw Tamil film Naan Pudicha Mappillai decided to remake it in Telugu as he was impressed with the character of father-in-law. He zeroed in Dasari Narayana Rao for this role "rather than going for known faces".

== Soundtrack ==
The music was composed by Raj–Koti.

Songs
No.	Title	Lyrics	Singer(s)	Length
1.	"Dandaalu Pettemu Durgamma"	Sirivennela Seetharama Sastry	S. P. Balasubrahmanyam	5:13
2.	"Ee Ratiri"	C. Narayana Reddy	Manjula	5:14
3.	"Iyyale Acchamaina Deepavali"	Sirivennela Seetharama Sastry	S. P. Balasubrahmanyam, Swarnalatha	5:44
4.	"Kottaro Gattiga"	Vennelakanti	Manjula, S. P. Balasubrahmanyam	4:52
5.	"Sri Ramudalle"	Vedavyasa	K. S. Chithra, S. P. Balasubrahmanyam	4:54

== Awards ==
Nandi Awards -1991

- Best Actor - Dasari Narayana Rao
- Best Supporting Actor - Vinod Kumar Alva
- Best Male Comedian - Babu Mohan

== Legacy ==
The beggar character played by Babu Mohan gained a lot of popularity for him. He had to resign to his government job and turn into a full-time actor.
