= Ugra Narasimham =

- Theatrical poster
- Directed by: Dasari Narayana Rao
- Written by: Dasari Narayana Rao
- Produced by: Dasari Narayana Rao
- Starring: Krishnam Raju; Jaya Prada; Mohan Babu; Jaggayya
- Music by: Satyam
- Production company: Tharaka Prabhu Films
- Release date: 1986
- Country: India
- Language: Telugu

Ugra Narasimham is a 1986 Telugu-language action drama film written, directed and produced by Dasari Narayana Rao under Tharaka Prabhu Films banner. The film stars Krishnam Raju, Jaya Prada and Mohan Babu. The music was composed by Satyam.

== Cast ==
- Krishnam Raju as Balaraju
- Jaya Prada as Jyothi
- Mohan Babu as Lawyer in the climax court scene
- Jaggayya as Chakravarthy
- Giri Babu as Giri
- Allu Ramalingaiah as Lingayya
- J.V. Somayajulu as Balaraju's grandfather
- Dasari Narayana Rao as Sumathi
- Sri Vidya as Sumathi's wife
- Thyagaraju as Thyagaiah
- Eswar Rao as Eswar Rao
- J.V. Ramana Murthi as S.P. Ramana Murthi
- Suryakantham as Lingayya's wife
- Jaya Malini
- Dubbing Janaki as Jyothi's mother
- Chalapathi Rao as Chalapathi
- Mada as M.V. Rao
- Chitti Babu as Constable
- P.J. Sarma as Judge

== Soundtrack ==
Soundtrack was composed by Satyam and lyrics were written by C. Narayana Reddy and Dasari Narayana Rao.

- "Nene Ugra" – S. P. Balasubrahmanyam
- "Dishum" – S. P. Balasubrahmanyam, P. Susheela
- "Veyyi Kannulu" – K. J. Yesudas, P. Susheela
- "Chana Undappa" – P. Susheela
