= Justice Chakravarthy =

- Theatrical release postet
- Directed by: Dasari Narayana Rao
- Written by: Dasari Narayana Rao
- Produced by: Dasari Narayana Rao
- Starring: Akkineni Nageswara Rao; Jayasudha; Sumalatha; Suhasini
- Cinematography: P. S. Selvaraj
- Edited by: B. Krishnam Raju
- Music by: Ramesh Naidu
- Production company: Taraka Prabhu Films
- Release date: 20 September 1984
- Running time: 157 mins
- Country: India
- Language: Telugu

Justice Chakravarthy is a 1984 Telugu-language legal drama film, produced and directed by Dasari Narayana Rao under his Taraka Prabhu Films banner. It stars Akkineni Nageswara Rao, Jayasudha, Sumalatha, Suhasini and music composed by Ramesh Naidu.

== Cast ==
- Akkineni Nageswara Rao as Justice Chakravarthy & Kalyan (Dual role)
- Jayasudha as Jayanthi
- Sumalatha as Latha
- Suhasini as Lakshmi
- Dasari Narayana Rao as Lawyer Baroda Bachchan
- Murali Mohan as Inspector Pavan Kumar
- Pratap K. Pothen as Pratap
- Chalapathi Rao as Dawood
- Arjan Janardhan Rao as Gaganna
- Radhika as herself in cameo appearance
- Vijaya Lalitha as item number
- Anuradha as item number
- Vijaya Chamundeswari (daughter of Savitri) as Pavan's wife

== Crew ==
- Art: Bhaskar Raju
- Choreography: Saleem
- Stills: M. Krishna
- Fights: Sambasiva Rao
- Playback: S. P. Balasubrahmanyam, P. Susheela, S. P. Sailaja
- Music: Ramesh Naidu
- Editing: B. Krishnam Raju
- Cinematography: P. S. Selvaraj
- Story - Screenplay - Dialogues - Lyrics - Producer - Director: Dasari Narayana Rao
- Banner: Taraka Prabhu Films
- Release Date: 20 September 1984

== Soundtrack ==
Justice Chakravarthy

Film score by Ramesh Naidu
- Released: 1984
- Genre: Soundtrack
- Length: 33:08
- Label: SEA Records
- Producer: Ramesh Naidu

Ramesh Naidu chronology
Aananda Bhairavi (1984)	Justice Chakravarthy (1984)	Sangeeta Samrat (1984)

Music composed by Ramesh Naidu. Lyrics were written by Dasari Narayana Rao. Music released on SEA Records Audio Company.

S. No.	Song title	Singers	length
1	"Premante Thelusukondira"	S. P. Balasubrahmanyam, P. Susheela	5:53
2	"Seethammaku Cheyisthi"	S. P. Balasubrahmanyam, P. Susheela, S. P. Sailaja	4:37
3	"Chandhamaama Digi Vachchelona"	S. P. Balasubrahmanyam, P. Susheela	4:37
4	"Ganthuluvese Gajjala Gurram"	S. P. Balasubrahmanyam, P. Susheela	4:29
5	"Wrong Number Ravanamma"	S. P. Balasubrahmanyam, P. Susheela	4:26
6	"Chiguru Maamillu"	S. P. Balasubrahmanyam	4:46
7	"Court Kellabokura"	S. P. Balasubrahmanyam	4:20
