= Kante Koothurne Kanu =

- Movie poster
- Directed by: Dasari Narayana Rao
- Written by: Dasari Narayana Rao; Thotapalli Madhu (dialogues)
- Produced by: Dasari Narayana Rao
- Starring: Ramya Krishnan; Dasari Narayana Rao; Jayasudha; Babloo Prithiveeraj
- Cinematography: K. S. Hari
- Edited by: B. Krishnam Raju
- Music by: Vandemataram Srinivas
- Production company: Dasari Films International
- Release date: 25 December 1998
- Running time: 133 minutes
- Country: India
- Language: Telugu

Kante Koothurne Kanu (transl. If you give birth, then give birth to a daughter) is a 1998 Indian Telugu-language drama film written, directed and produced by Dasari Narayana Rao starring Ramya Krishna in the lead role. The film won the National Film Award Special Mention Feature Film, "for taking a stand on gender discrimination" at the 46th National Film Awards, and won five state Nandi Awards including Best Feature Film. The film was later remade in Kannada Language as Hetthare Henanne Herabeku (2007).

== Plot ==
The film explores the intricacies of gender discrimination, and misogyny in India.

== Cast ==
- Dasari Narayana Rao
- Jayasudha as Satya
- Ramya Krishna as Jyothi
- Babloo Prithiveeraj
- Brahmaji
- A.V.S.
- Ali
- Brahmanandam
- Venu Madhav
- Chantu
- Narra Venkateswara Rao
- Chalapathi Rao
- Jayanthi
- T. L. Kanta Rao
- Giri Babu
- P. J. Sharma
- Allu Ramalingaiah
- Chitti Babu
- Subbaraya Sharma
- Ananth
- Kabeer Lal
- Rama Prabha
- Annapoorna

== Production ==
The filming was completed within 25 days.

== Soundtrack ==
| # | Song | Singer |
|---|---|---|
| 1 | "Kante Koothurne" | Vandemataram Srinivas |
| 2 | "Theluginti" | S. P. Balasubrahmanyam |

== Awards ==
National Film Awards

- Special Jury Award (Feature Film - Director) - Dasari Narayana Rao

Nandi Awards - 1998

- Second Best Feature Film - Silver - Dasari Narayana Rao
- Best Director - Dasari Narayana Rao
- Best Story Writer - Dasari Narayana Rao
- Best Lyricist - Suddala Ashok Teja
- Special Jury Award - Ramya Krishna
