= Manushulanta Okkate =

- Theatrical release poster
- Directed by: Dasari Narayana Rao
- Screenplay by: Dasari Narayana Rao
- Story by: V. Mahesh; R. K. Dharmaraj
- Produced by: Duddu Venkateswara Rao; V. Mahesh
- Starring: N. T. Rama Rao; Jamuna; Manjula
- Cinematography: M. Kannappa
- Edited by: K. Balu
- Music by: S. Rajeswara Rao
- Production company: Aditya Chitra
- Release date: 7 April 1976
- Running time: 145 mins
- Country: India
- Language: Telugu

Manushulanta Okkate (transl. All Humans are Equal) is a 1976 Indian Telugu-language drama film, produced by Duddu Venkateswara Rao and V. Mahesh under the Aditya Chitra banner and directed by Dasari Narayana Rao. It stars N. T. Rama Rao, Jamuna and Manjula, with music composed by S. Rajeswara Rao. The film was a box office hit.

== Plot ==
The film narrates a story with a message of universal brotherhood and equality between the rich & poor.

During the pre-independence era, Zamindar Sarva Rayudu was a sovereign who suppressed & enslaved the public of his territory. Rajendra Babu / Raja, his heir, also walks in his footsteps. Once, Radha, a plucky village girl, hinders his tyranny, whose words lead to a meteoritic transformation in Raja. Sarva Rayudu ruins her province when Raja quits and defies his father's despotism. He resides with the villagers and shares their hardships. Meanwhile, Sarva Rayudu goes abroad to fix his daughter Indumati's nuptial. At that time, Raja endears and knits Radha, and she conceives. On his return, Sarva Rayudu shrinks from mingling with the underdogs and edicts to slay Radha. Raja succeeds in securing her and crossing the region but sacrifices his life. Independence arrives, and Radha gives birth to a baby boy, Ramu.

Years pass, and Radha molds her son into a proficient who falls for his collegian Shanti. Destiny makes her his paternal aunt's daughter. Hence, Radha rejects the match and divulges the past. Ramu steps into Sarva Rayudu's realm of empire and challenges his grandfather with his identity. He discovers the people still struggling with the violations. Ramu sets out to improve their livelihood by forming an association. So, Sarva Rayudu endangers Radha, who binds her son with a bond of affection. However, she frees him, viewing the area's woes. Then Ramu relieved their lands from Sarva Rayudu, thwarting the feudal system. Next, they all farm the land together with their forces. At that point, enraged Sarva Rayudu covertly sets the harvest. It induces public rebellion and onslaughts on Sarva Rayudu. At last, Radha shields him under the principle of Non-Violence, which reforms Sarva Rayudu. Finally, the movie ends happily with the proclamation that All Humans are Equal.

== Cast ==
- N. T. Rama Rao as Rajendra Babu & Ramu
- Jamuna as Radha
- Manjula as Shanti
- Satyanarayana as Sarvarayudu
- Allu Ramalingaiah as Chalamaiah
- Nagesh as Ganapati
- Rajasri as Indumathi Devi
- Ramaprabha as Mutyalu & Rama
- Kakarala as Sundara Chary
- Kommineni Seshagiri Rao
- Chalapathi Rao

== Soundtrack ==
Music composed by S. Rajeswara Rao.

S. No	Song title	Lyrics	Singers	length
1	"Anubhavinchu Raja"	C. Narayana Reddy	S. P. Balasubrahmanyam	3:41
2	"Kaalam Kadu"	Acharya Aatreya	S. P. Balasubrahmanyam	3:15
3	"Muthyalu Vasthava"	Kosaraju	S. P. Balasubrahmanyam, P. Susheela	4:02
4	"Ninne Pelladata"	Dasari Narayana Rao	P. Susheela	4:08
5	"Tatha Baagunnava"	C. Narayana Reddy	S. P. Balasubrahmanyam	3:52
6	"Yevadidiraa Ee Bhoomi"	C. Narayana Reddy	S. P. Balasubrahmanyam, P. Susheela	3:42

== Accolades ==
- Nandi Award for Second Best Story Writer – V. Mahesh (1976)

== Legacy ==
The title of the song "Ninne Pelladata" inspires a 1996 film of the same name. Also, the title of the song "Anubhavinchu Raja" inspires a 2021 film of the same name.
