= Bangaru Kutumbam =

- DVD cover
- Directed by: Dasari Narayana Rao
- Screenplay by: Dasari Narayana Rao
- Story by: V. Vijayendra Prasad; Ramaa Films Unit
- Produced by: Kaikala Nageswara Rao; Satyanarayana (Presents)
- Starring: Akkineni Nageswara Rao; Jayasudha Vikram; Rambha
- Cinematography: K. S. Hari
- Edited by: Nageswara Rao; Satyam
- Music by: Raj–Koti
- Production company: Ramaa Films
- Release date: 18 February 1994
- Running time: 111 minutes
- Country: India
- Language: Telugu

Bangaru Kutumbam (transl. Golden Family) is a 1994 Indian Telugu-language drama film, produced by Kaikala Nageswara Rao under the Ramaa Films banner, presented by Satyanarayana and directed by Dasari Narayana Rao. It stars Akkineni Nageswara Rao and Jayasudha with music composed by Raj–Koti. The film was a box office success and won two Nandi Awards.

== Plot ==
The film revolves around a conscientious joint family, Srinivasa Rao is its paterfamilias and leads a pleasant joyful family life with his ideal companion Savitri and three sons Hari, Suryam, and Kumar. Time being, they are nuptial and blessed with kids when disputes erupt, which turns into turbulence. Here, Srinivasa Rao discerns it is due to a joint family and decides to detach them, which Savitri refuses. So, Srinivasa Rao tricks and splits them. Soon, their affection again flourishes when Savitri affirms the actuality and edicts her husband to retrieve her children, but he denies it. Ergo, she too quits. At last, she realizes that Srinivasa Rao's intention is equitable. Finally, the movie ends happily as they all live individually with hearts united, showing unity in diversity.

== Cast ==
- Akkineni Nageswara Rao as Srinivasa Rao
- Jayasudha as Savitri, wife of Srinivasa Rao
- Harish as Hari
- Rambha as Pushpa
- Raj Kumar as Kumar
- Rajeevi as Gautami
- Vikram as Suryam
- Yamuna as Krishnaveni
- Allu Ramalingaiah as Punyakoti
- Satyanarayana as Dorababu
- Dasari Narayana Rao as Mudaliyar
- Giri Babu as Pushpa's brother-in-law
- Kanta Rao
- Babu Mohan as Shekhara
- Ananth as Hari's friend
- Sudha as Pushpa's sister
- Radha Prashanthi as Pushpa's friend
- Disco Shanti as Chiramani
- Y. Vijaya as Taramani

== Soundtrack ==
Music composed by Raj–Koti. Lyrics were written by Veturi. Music released on Supreme Music Company.

Track listing
No.	Title	Singer(s)	Length
1.	"Ammante Premaku Roopam"	S. P. Balasubrahmanyam, Chitra	4:30
2.	"Bahut Achchagundi"	S. P. Balasubrahmanyam, Chitra	4:55
3.	"Naa Peru Cheeramani"	S. P. Balasubrahmanyam, Chitra	4:57
4.	"Cheliyaa Cheliyaa"	S. P. Balasubrahmanyam, Chitra	5:04
5.	"Ammante Premaku Roopam" (II)	S. P. Balasubrahmanyam, Chitra	4:51
6.	"Koko Raika Take Chota"	S. P. Balasubrahmanyam, Chitra	4:49

== Reception ==
The Indian Express wrote "The subject of a united ideal family separating and then re-uniting has been tackled often enough, but Dasari still manages to infuse some freshness in his handling of the subject".

== Awards ==
Nandi Awards - 1994

- Best Feature Film - Gold - Kaikala Nageswara Rao
- Best Actor - Akkineni Nageswara Rao
