= Swarg Narak =

- Theatrical release poster
- Directed by: Dasari Narayana Rao
- Written by: Raj Baldev Raj (Dialogue)
- Screenplay by: Dasari Narayana Rao
- Story by: Dasari Narayana Rao
- Based on: Swargam Narakam (1975) by Dasari Narayana Rao
- Produced by: B.Nagi Reddy
- Starring: Sanjeev Kumar; Jeetendra; Vinod Mehra; Moushumi Chatterjee; Shabana Azmi
- Cinematography: P.L. Rai
- Edited by: K Balu
- Music by: Rajesh Roshan
- Production company: Vijaya Productions
- Release date: 21 December 1978
- Running time: 164 minutes
- Country: India
- Language: Hindi

Swarag Narak (transl. Heaven and Hell) is a 1978 Indian Hindi-language drama film written and directed by Dasari Narayana Rao. Produced by B. Nagi Reddi under the Vijaya Productions banner, the film features Sanjeev Kumar, Jeetendra, Vinod Mehra, Moushumi Chatterjee, and Shabana Azmi. The music was composed by Rajesh Roshan. The film is a remake of the Telugu film Swargam Narakam (1975) made by the same director. Swarg Narak was a commercial success. The Remake Rights of this film are now owned by Glamour Eyes Films.

== Plot ==
This is the story of three couples. The first couple is that of Tripathi (Sanjeev Kumar), who always takes advantage of others' mistakes and position and earns money and his wife Mary. The second one is that of Geeta (Shabana Azmi) and Romeo Vinod (Vinod Mehra), while the jealous and possessive Shobha (Moushumi Chatterjee) and Vicky Kapoor (Jeetendra) form the third one.

The first couple is a happily married one. The second couple stays with Vinod's mother (Kamini Kaushal). Vinod spends a lot of time with Leena (Prema Narayan) and attending late night parties while Geeta patiently awaits her husband every night. Once Shobha happens to see Vicky with Radha (Tanuja), she assumes they are having an affair and pesters Vicky about it. When Vicky denies it, she leaves him. On the other hand, Vinod decides to leave the house, but destiny plays its role. He meets with an accident and during his recovery period, Geeta proves how important she is for him. He repents and completely changes into a new soft-spoken and good man. On the other hand, Shobha spoils her own relationship to such a stage that Vicky is compelled to leave his house after Radha's tragic death. At this juncture, Tripathi steps in to mend the couple. Some of the events that follow are hilarious sequences. Whether Tripathi is successful in mending these couples forms the rest of the story.

== Cast ==
- Sanjeev Kumar as Pandit Sohanlal Tripathi
- Jeetendra as Mohan "Micky" Kapoor
- Vinod Mehra as Vinod
- Moushumi Chatterjee as Shobha Mohan Kapoor
- Shabana Azmi as Geeta Vinod
- Tanuja as Radha
- Shobhini Singh as Mary
- Madan Puri as Lala Lalchand
- A. K. Hangal as Gajanan , Geeta's father
- Raj Mehra as Jamna ,Shobha's father
- Om Shivpuri as College Principal Ajit Kalra
- Jagdeep as Chandu ,Vinod's friend
- Paintal as Shambhu, Shobha's servant
- Vikram Gokhale as Cinema Hall Manager Verma
- Birbal as Zaveri, Cinema Hall employee
- Saleem as Student Gaurav
- Adil Amaan as Gautam
- Kamini Kaushal as Kaulshalya , Vinod's mother
- Shammi as Nirmala , Shobha's mother
- Pandari Bai as Vignesh
- Prema Narayan as Leena
- Farita Boyce as Lily
- Komilla Wirk as Raksha
- Baby Sumathi as Jia
- Baby Gowri as Neeta
- Helen as Cabaret Dancer

== Soundtrack ==
#	Song title	Singers	Lyricist	Time	Notes
1	"Leena O Leena Dil Toone Cheena"	Kishore Kumar	Anand Bakshi	4:55	
2	"Nahin Nahin Koi Tumsa Haseen"	Kishore Kumar, Asha Bhosle	Anand Bakshi	5.50	
3	"I Love you"	Lata Mangeshkar	Harindranath Chattopadhyay	6.20	
4	"Aag Hai Lagi Hui Yahan Wahan"	Mohammad Rafi	Anand Bakshi	6:00	
