= Yuddham (1984 film) =

- Directed by: Dasari Narayana Rao
- Screenplay by: Dasari Narayana Rao
- Story by: Rashbihari Lal
- Based on: Duti Mon (1970 film) by Pijush Basu
- Starring: Krishna; Krishnam Raju; Jayasudha; Jaya Prada
- Music by: Chakravarthy
- Release date: 1984
- Running time: 2h 45m
- Country: India
- Language: Telugu

Yuddham (transl. War) is a 1984 Telugu-language action drama film co-written and directed by Dasari Narayana Rao. It stars Krishna, Krishnam Raju, Jayasudha and Jaya Prada. The music was composed by Chakravarthy. The film is a remake of the Bengali film Duti Mon.

== Cast ==
- Krishna as Kishan & Krishna Rao (Dual role)
- Krishnam Raju as Raja & Arjuna Rao (Dual role)
- Jayasudha
- Jaya Prada
- Radhika as Raja's mother
- Sujatha as Kishan's mother
- Kaikala Satyanarayana as Parvathalu
- Rao Gopal Rao as Panakalu
- Allu Rama Lingaiah
- Gollapudi Maruti Rao
