= Erra Bus =

2014 film

Errabus
- Directed by: Dasari Narayana Rao
- Screenplay by: Dasari Naryana Rao
- Story by: N. Raghavan
- Based on: Manjapai (Tamil) by N. Ragavan
- Produced by: Dasari Narayana Rao
- Starring: Vishnu Manchu; Catherine Tresa; Dasari Narayana Rao
- Cinematography: Anji
- Music by: Chakri
- Distributed by: 24 Frames Factory (worldwide)
- Release date: 14 November 2014
- Country: India
- Language: Telugu

Erra Bus (transl. Red Bus) is a 2014 Indian Telugu-language film directed and produced by Dasari Narayana Rao under his banner Tharaka Prabhu Films, it was his final film as director. The film stars Vishnu Manchu and Catherine Tresa. Dasari Narayana Rao plays a crucial role in the movie. Chakri has composed the music for the movie while Anji has taken care of the cinematography. The movie is a remake of N. Ragavan's Tamil film, Manjapai. The principal photography of Erra Bus started on 28 July 2014 in Hyderabad. The audio launch of the movie was held on 31 October 2014.

The movie was released on 14 November 2014 to negative reviews and was a box office disaster.

== Cast ==
- Vishnu Manchu as Rajesh
- Catherine Tresa as Raji
- Dasari Narayana Rao as Rajesh's grandfather
- Nassar
- Brahmanandam
- Murali Mohan
- Krishnudu
- Ali as an auto driver
- Surya
- M. S. Narayana
- Tirupathi Prakash
- Raghu Babu as Wire
- Y. Kasi Viswanath
- Hema
- Surekha Vani
- Sri Lakshmi
- Jayaseela
- Ashok Kumar
- Baby Neerajitha

== Production ==
In late June 2014, Dasari Narayana Rao acquired the remake rights of N. Ragavan's Manjapai from Thirrupathi Brothers. In mid-July 2014, it was confirmed that Dasari Narayana Rao himself would direct the film which marks his 151st film as a director while Chakri would compose the music for the film. The title of the film was declared as Errabus. Anji was selected as the cinematographer.

Dasari Narayana Rao stated in the end of June 2014 that he would reprise the role of grandfather played by Rajkiran in the original while Vishnu Manchu would play his grandson in the film. Catherine Tresa was selected as the heroine of the film which marks her first collaboration with both Vishnu and Narayana Rao respectively. Brahmanandam, M. S. Narayana, Krishnudu, Ali, Raghu Babu and Kasi Viswanath were included in the film's cast.

The principal photography began on 28 July 2014 in the outskirts of Hyderabad. A song was shot on Vishnu and Catherine at Ramoji Film City. The film's shooting continued at Film Nagar in Hyderabad. Later, the filming continued in Ramanaidu Studios in the second week of August 2014 and a scene featuring Catherine slapping Vishnu was shot there. After completing a long schedule on 20 September 2014 at Ramoji Film City the shooting continued at Ooty where two songs were shot on whose completion the film's principal photography came to an end.

== Soundtrack ==
Chakri was selected as the music director of the film which marked his only collaboration with Dasari Narayana Rao. This was one of the last projects which Chakri had worked before his death. Narayana Rao said in a press release that the film's soundtrack would feature six songs and the recording of the songs started on 18 July 2014 at Prasad Labs in Hyderabad. In an interview to The Hindu, Suddala Ashok Teja said that he is penning lyrics for the film's songs. The song "Ayyo Ayyo Thatha" is based on song of same name from Manja Pai.

Track listing
No.	Title	Lyrics	Singer(s)	Length
1.	"Ey Challagaali Challagaali"	Bhaskara Bhatla	Venu Srirangam, Sravana Bhargavi	04:30
2.	"Ontariga Nuvvunte"	Dasari Narayana Rao	Vijay Yesudas	01:59
3.	"Om Namo Namo"	Bhaskara Bhatla	Simha	04:30
4.	"Ayyo Ayyo Thathayya"	Karunakaran	Suswara Jaswira, Madhura Swara	03:36
5.	"Navvamma Thalli Navvamma"	Suddala Ashok Teja	M. M. Keeravani	03:41
6.	"Aakasana Puduthaadu"	Dasari Narayana Rao	Vijay Yesudas	04:37
