= Mestri (film) =

- Promotional poster
- Directed by: Suresh Krissna
- Written by: Dasari Narayana Rao
- Produced by: K. Ramakrishna Prasad
- Starring: Dasari Narayana Rao
- Cinematography: Ch. Ramana Raju
- Edited by: Gautham Raju
- Music by: Vandemataram Srinivas
- Production company: Soubhagya Films
- Release date: 12 March 2009
- Running time: 137 minutes
- Country: India
- Language: Telugu

Mestri (transl. Expert) is a 2009 Indian Telugu-language political drama film directed by Suresh Krissna and produced by K. Ramakrishna Prasad. The film stars Dasari Narayana Rao, who also wrote the story and screenplay, alongside Vijayachander, Pradeep Rawat, Srihari and Vijayakumar. It was released on 12 March 2009. Rao won the Nandi Award for Best Actor.

== Plot ==
A new labourer at the dockyard suddenly garners the accolades of his colleagues and soon due to his intelligence and the good deeds for his mates becomes their leader. At the same time there are murders of those who seem to be suspicious. Who is their killer? Where from has this new labourer come from? What is his history and ulterior motive?

== Cast ==
- Dasari Narayana Rao as Palakollu
- Vijayachander as Gopalakrishna
- Pradeep Rawat as Subbaraju
- Sayaji Shinde as Apparaju
- Srihari as a suspended cop
- Sujitha as Jhansi
- Vijayakumar as a fake Gandhian
- Rahul Dev
- Giri Babu
- Chandra Mohan
- M. S. Narayana
- Hema Chaudhary
- Madhusudhan Rao as an army officer
- Mohan Babu (cameo appearance)

== Production ==
Mestri was directed by Suresh Krissna, and produced by K. Ramakrishna Prasad under Soubhagya Films. Dasari Narayana Rao wrote the story and screenplay, and Rajendra Kumar wrote the dialogues. Editing by Gowtam Raju. Shooting took place predominantly at Ramoji Film City.

== Soundtrack ==
The soundtrack was composed by Vandemataram Srinivas. It was released on 23 February 2009.

Track listing
No.	Title	Performer(s)	Length
1.	"Anna Mestry Anna"	Shankar Mahadevan, Geetha Madhuri
2.	"Naagamalli Dharilo"	Vandemataram Srinivas
3.	"Anagaanaga"	K. J. Yesudas, K. S. Chithra
4.	"Yedanunchi Vachaavo" (Bit)	Shankar Mahadevan
5.	"Mana Mathrubasha Telugu"	K. J. Yesudas, S. P. Balasubrahmanyam, Manjula K
6.	"Vasthanantay Vasthadu"	Jayam Srinivas, Pranava Sheshasai
7.	"O Thalli Na Thalli"	Vandemataram Srinivas

== Release and reception ==
Mestri was released on 12 March 2009, and became controversial because many of its dialogues were interpreted as being targeted at the-then Praja Rajyam Party chief Chiranjeevi, despite Krissna's denial. Radhika Rajamani of Rediff.com rated the film two stars out of five, saying, "One has to wait to see if the climate is favourable for Mestri's percolation to the audience in all the centres." The Times of India said it "fails to impress on many counts. Barring some potshots against Chiranjeevi and advising youngsters not to be 'star-struck', the film offers little else. Even the predictable and slow-moving screenplay takes its toll on the audience." Sify wrote, "The film is just laced on a Utopian model and hence lacks entertainment values."
