= Gorintaku (1979 film) =

- Directed by: Dasari Narayana Rao
- Written by: Dasari Narayana Rao
- Story by: K. Ramalakshmi copied from Ranganayakamma's novel
- Produced by: K. Murari
- Starring: Shobhan Babu; J. V. Ramana Murthy; Savitri; Devadas Kanakala; Sujatha; Prabhakar Reddy; Sharada; Ramaprabha; P. Ravi Shankar
- Music by: K. V. Mahadevan
- Release date: 19 October 1979
- Country: India
- Language: Telugu

Gorintaku is a 1979 Indian Telugu-language romantic drama film directed by Dasari Narayana Rao. It is a family sentiment film starring Sobhan Babu and Sujatha. The initial scenes of the film were shot in black and white. The title song "Gorinta Poochindi Komma Lekunda", written by Devulapalli Krishnasastri, casting Savitri is remembered even today. The film was remade in Hindi as Mehndi Rang Layegi (1982).

== Plot ==
Ramu's father is a drunkard, who neglects his family. His daughter had died after he beat her, and Ramu (Shobhan Babu) had run away from home. Ramu studies on charity, and in medical college meets Swapna (Sujatha). Ramu tutors Swapna's siblings and lives in her summer house. Swapna is married off to Anand, a London-based doctor who is already married. By the time this fact comes to light, Ramu meets Padma (Vakkalanka Padma) and falls in love. A love triangle ensues, with Swapna finally sacrificing her love and Ramu and Padma coming together in the end.

== Cast ==
- Sobhan Babu as Ramu
- Sujatha as Swapna
- Savitri
- Vakkalanka Padma as Padma
- J. V. Ramana Murthi
- Devadas Kanakala
- Prabhakar Reddy
- Sharada
- Chalam
- Rama Prabha
- P. Ravi Shankar

== Production ==
The producer Katragadda Murari initially wanted K. S. Sethumadhavan to direct this film but differences arose due to choice of music composer as Sethu wanted M. S. Viswanathan to compose whereas Murari wanted K. V. Mahadevan. After Sethumadhavan walked out, Dasari Narayana Rao was chosen to direct. For the role of Padma, Vakkalanka Padma, daughter of singer Vakkalanka Sarala was chosen to portray it. Actor and voice actor P. Ravishankar portrayed the younger version of Shoban Babu.

== Awards ==
- Filmfare Best Film Award (Telugu) - K. Murari
- Filmfare Best Director Award (Telugu) - Dasari Narayana Rao

== Soundtrack ==
- "Cheppanaa Sigguvidichi Chepparanidi" (Lyricist: Atreya; P. Susheela and S. P. Balasubrahmanyam)
- "Ela Ela Daachaavu" (Lyricist: Devulapalli Krishna Sastri; Singers: P. Susheela, S. P. Balasubrahmanyam)
- "Ilaaga Vachchi Alaaga Techchi" (Lyricist: Sri Sri; Singers: P. Susheela and S. P. Balasubrahmanyam)
- "Gorinta Poochindi Komma Lekunda" (Lyricist: Devulapalli Krishna Sastri; Singer: P. Susheela)
- "Komma Kommako Sannayi" (Lyricist: Veturi; Singers: P. Susheela and S. P. Balasubrahmanyam)
- "Padite Silalaina Karagali" (Lyricist: Atreya; Singer: P. Susheela)
- "Eytantav Eytantavu" (Lyricist: Atreya; Singers: P. Susheela and S. P. Balasubrahmanyam)
