= M. L. A. Yedukondalu =

- Directed by: Dasari Narayana Rao
- Written by: Dasari Narayana Rao
- Produced by: D. Himabindu
- Starring: Dasari Narayana Rao; Sujatha; Gummadi
- Cinematography: K. S. Mani
- Edited by: D. Rajagopal
- Music by: K. Chakravarthy
- Production company: Hima Movies
- Release date: 1983
- Country: India
- Language: Telugu

M. L. A. Yedukondalu is a 1983 Indian Telugu-language film written and directed by Dasari Narayana Rao, who also stars in the titular role along with Sujatha and Gummadi. Produced by D. Himabindu and presented by Rayapa Raju, it was a critical and commercial success. It was later remade in Hindi by Dasari himself as Aaj Ka M.L.A. Ram Avtar in 1984.

== Plot ==
M. L. A. Yedukondalu tells the story of a barber named Yedukondalu, who rises to political prominence in his fight against corrupt practices in Indian democracy. He challenges the prevailing political system and seeks to ensure that votes are not bought but instead used as a weapon against dishonest politicians. Dasari Narayana Rao, who also directed and wrote the film, presents a sharp commentary on Indian politics without directly attacking any political parties or individuals. The film emphasizes the importance of clean and fair elections.

== Cast ==
- Dasari Narayana Rao as M. L. A. Yedukondalu
- Sujatha
- Gummadi as Gopalakrishnayya
- Peketi Sivaram as Sivayya
- Allu Ramalingaiah
- Suryakantham
- Prabhakar Reddy as Yella Rao
- Yeleswaram Ranga as Ranga Rao
- Vankayala Satyanarayana as Satyanarayana
- Bhimeswara Rao as Pulla Rao
- Jayamalini

== Production ==
The film was shot at Annapurna Studios, and Dasari Narayana Rao worked quickly to complete it. M. L. A. Yedukondalu was released in 1983. The year also witnessed the Andhra Pradesh Legislative Assembly elections, where the Telugu Desam Party and N. T. Rama Rao rose to political prominence.

== Music ==
The film's music was composed by K. Chakravarthy, with lyrics written by Sri Sri, Palagummi Viswanatham, and Dasari Narayana Rao. The soundtrack includes the following songs:

1. "Andagadu Santakelithe Chandamama" – S. P. Balasubrahmanyam, P. Susheela
2. "Venkanna Edukondalu Venkanna Govinda" – S. P. Balasubrahmanyam, group
3. "Ento Beedavade Gopalu Ento" – P. Susheela
4. "Tholi Ne Chesina Poojaphalamu" – S. Janaki, Dasari Narayana Rao
5. "Patimalara Brastulaga Badhapadda" – P. Susheela, group

== Awards ==
- National Film Award for Best Female Playback Singer - P. Suseela (1984)
- Nandi Award for Best Dialogue Writer - Dasari Narayana Rao (1983)

== Reception ==
The film was well-received for its bold take on Indian political corruption and the necessity for electoral reform. Dasari Narayana Rao's direction and acting were widely praised, and the film's satirical tone, particularly its dialogues, contributed to its success. The film's success also led to its remake in Hindi as Aaj Ka M.L.A. Ram Avtar (1984), starring Rajesh Khanna and directed by Dasari Narayana Rao.
