= Oorantha Sankranthi =

- Theatrical release poster
- Directed by: Dasari Narayana Rao
- Written by: Dasari Narayana Rao
- Produced by: Kodali Bosu Babu; Kotagiri Gopala Rao
- Starring: Akkineni Nageswara Rao; Krishna; Sridevi; Jayasudha
- Cinematography: V. S. R. Swamy
- Edited by: Kotagiri Gopala Rao
- Music by: S. P. Balasubrahmanyam
- Production companies: Veera Rani Enterprises; Kotagiri Films
- Release date: 12 February 1983
- Running time: 134 minutes
- Country: India
- Language: Telugu

Oorantha Sankranthi is a 1983 Indian Telugu-language drama film, written and directed by Dasari Narayana Rao. It stars Akkineni Nageswara Rao, Krishna, Sridevi and Jayasudha, with music composed by S. P. Balasubrahmanyam.

== Plot ==
The film begins in a village where President Raghavaiah leads a happy family life with his wife, Bhanumati, and two sons, Venu and Gopi. Venu is the progeny of Raghavaiah's first marriage, leading Bhanumati to look down on him. Meanwhile, Raghavaiah's cunning brother-in-law Kotaiah, lives with them. Gopi loves Kotaiah's daughter, Satya, while Venu falls for Durga, a peasant.

The government sanctions ₹50,000 for the village panchayat, which Kotaiah steals by endangering Gumustha Ranga Rao and forcing Raghavaiah to resign. Kotaiah then deceives his way into becoming the President and tyrant, with Venu standing in his way. Kotaiah creates a rift through Venu's love affair, which Raghavaiah opposes. Consequently, Venu leaves and, with Gopi's help, marries Durga. Later, Kotaiah schemes to build a hospital by displacing the destitute's hamlet for selfish reasons. Raghavaiah opposes it and is humiliated. Venu protects his father. Kotaiah then manipulates Gopi, causing a rift between the siblings, leading to Raghavaiah's death. Eventually, Gumustha Ranga Rao returns, and Venu warns him. Exploiting this, Kotaiah kills him and frames Venu, but Gopi learns the truth and rescues his brother. In the end, the brothers defeat the villains. The movie concludes happily with the family's reunion and the marriage of Gopi and Satya.

== Cast ==
- Akkineni Nageswara Rao as Venu
- Krishna as Gopi
- Sridevi as Satya
- Jayasudha as Durga
- Rao Gopal Rao as Kotaiah
- Satyanarayana as Raghavaiah
- Allu Ramalingaiah as Appanna
- Giri Babu as Giri
- Nagesh as Tippanna
- Sakshi Ranga Rao as Gumustha Ranga Rao
- Vankayala Satyanarayana as M.L.A.
- Suryakantam as Hostel Warden
- Rajasulochana as Bhanumathi
- Rama Prabha as Ganga
- Mamatha as Mangatayaru
- Dubbing Janaki as Ranga Rao's wife
- Nirmalamma as Durga's Bamma

== Soundtrack ==
The soundtrack was composed by S. P. Balasubrahmanyam, with lyrics by Dasari Narayana Rao. The soundtrack album was released by ACE Records Audio Company.

| Song title | Singers | Length |
|---|---|---|
| "Sambararala Sankranthi" | S. P. Balasubrahmanyam, S. Janaki, P. Susheela | 6:18 |
| "Oornatha Gola Gola" | S. P. Balasubrahmanyam, P. Susheela | 5:05 |
| "Toorupu Deepam" | S. P. Balasubrahmanyam | 4:29 |
| "O Bhama Nee Nomu" | S. P. Balasubrahmanyam, S. Janaki | 4:37 |
| "Jum Jum Antu Vastondi" | S. P. Balasubrahmanyam, P. Susheela | 4:31 |
