= Bahudoorapu Batasari =

- Theatrical release poster
- Directed by: Dasari Narayana Rao
- Screenplay by: Dasari Narayana Rao
- Story by: Paalagummi Padma Raju; R. K. Dharma Raju
- Produced by: Dasari Narayana Rao
- Starring: Akkineni Nageswara Rao; Sujatha
- Cinematography: V. S. R. Swamy
- Edited by: B. Krishnam Raju
- Music by: Ramesh Naidu
- Production company: Taraka Prabhu Films
- Release date: 19 May 1983
- Running time: 168 mins
- Country: India
- Language: Telugu

Bahudoorapu Batasari (transl. Distant Nomad) is a 1983 Indian Telugu-language drama film, produced and directed by Dasari Narayana Rao. It stars Akkineni Nageswara Rao, Sujatha with music composed by Ramesh Naidu. The film was recorded as a Super Hit at the box office. The film won two Nandi Awards.

== Cast ==
- Akkineni Nageswara Rao as Prasad
- Sujatha as Prabha
- Dasari Narayana Rao as Avataram
- Gummadi as Prasad's father
- Prabhakar Reddy as Madhusudhan Rao
- Jaggayya as Prabha's father-in-law
- Allu Ramalingaiah as Avataram's father
- Bhanu Chander as Bhanu
- Ramakrishna as Prabha's brother-in-law
- Peketi Sivaram as Siva
- Narayana Rao as Murali Krishna
- Raja as Raja
- Eeswar Rao as Eeswar Rao
- Vanakayala Satyanarayana as Satyanarayana
- R. Narayana Murthy as Avataram's elder son
- Chitti Babu as Avataram's younger son
- Sumalatha as Julie
- Suhasini as Subhashini
- Rama Prabha as Sahastrakoti Suryaprabha
- Jayamalini as Ananda Bhairavi
- Pushpalata as Prasad's mother
- Mamatha as Mangatayaru
- Krishnaveni as Saraswathi

== Soundtrack ==
Bahudoorapu Batasari

Film score by Ramesh Naidu
- Released: 1983
- Genre: Soundtrack
- Length: 23:37
- Label: ACE Audio
- Producer: Ramesh Naidu

Ramesh Naidu chronology
Megha Sandesham (1983)	Bahudoorapu Batasari (1983)	Rendu Jella Seeta (1983)

Music composed by Ramesh Naidu. Lyrics were written by Dasari Narayana Rao. Music released on ACE Audio Company.

S. No.	Song title	Singers	length
1	"Pampanadhi Theerana"	S. P. Balasubrahmanyam	4:49
2	"Evaru Evaro"	S. P. Balasubrahmanyam, P. Susheela	5:55
3	"Meghama"	P. Susheela	4:40
4	"Alamatinchi Pothunanu"	S. P. Balasubrahmanyam, Vani Jayaram	4:35
5	"Ekkadi Thalupulu"	S. P. Balasubrahmanyam	3:38

== Awards ==
Nandi Awards - 1983

- Best Male Playback Singer - S. P. Balasubrahmanyam
- Best Story Writer - Palagummi Padmaraju & R.K. Dharma Raju

== Other ==
- VCDs and DVDs on - SHALIMAR Video Company, Hyderabad
