= Meghasandesam =

1982 Telugu film by Dasari Narayana Rao

- Theatrical release poster
- Directed by: Dasari Narayana Rao
- Written by: Dasari Narayana Rao
- Produced by: Dasari Narayana Rao
- Starring: Akkineni Nageswara Rao; Jaya Prada; Jayasudha
- Cinematography: P. S. Selvaraj
- Edited by: B. Krishnam Raju
- Music by: Ramesh Naidu
- Production company: Taraka Prabhu Films
- Release date: 24 September 1982
- Running time: 151 minutes
- Country: India
- Language: Telugu

Meghasandesam (transl. Message from the clouds) is a 1982 Telugu-language drama film written, directed and produced by Dasari Narayana Rao under his Taraka Prabhu Films banner. The film stars Akkineni Nageswara Rao, Jayaprada, and Jayasudha, with music composed by Ramesh Naidu. Meghasandesam marks the 200th film of Akkineni Nageswara Rao.This film is inspired from 1930 German film The Blue Angel.

The film received widespread critical acclaim and won several accolades, including four National Film Awards and nine Nandi Awards. It was featured in the Indian Panorama section at the 9th International Film Festival of India and at the Moscow International Film Festival. Among its awards, Meghasandesam won the National Film Award for Best Telugu Feature Film, the Filmfare award for Best Telugu Film, and the Nandi Award for Best Feature Film.

== Plot ==
Ravindra Babu, a celebrated poet with a deep reverence for art and nature, marries Parvathi, a simple and modest woman. Despite their marital bond, Ravindra Babu finds himself unable to derive artistic inspiration from Parvathi, leading to a disconnect between the two.

During this time, he meets Padma, a talented dancer whose artistry, expressions, and charm captivate him, inspiring his creative pursuits. Ravindra Babu becomes enamored with Padma's artistic abilities, which causes distress to Parvathi upon discovering her husband's association with Padma, a woman of questionable background.

Parvathi’s brother, Jagannatham, who prioritizes his sister's well-being above all else, confronts Padma and demands she stay away from the family. Ravindra Babu, deeply affected by the situation, becomes increasingly despondent. Consumed by his thoughts of Padma, he begins to wander aimlessly. Ultimately, he returns to meet Parvathi one final time before succumbing to his despair and dying.

== Cast ==
- Akkineni Nageswara Rao as Ravindra Babu
- Jayasudha as Parvati, Ravindra Babu's wife
- Jayaprada as Padma
- Jaggayya as Ravindra Babu's brother-in-law Jagannatham
- Mangalampalli Balamuralikrishna as himself
- Subhashini as Chandrika
- Saleema as Ravindra Babu's grown-up daughter

== Music ==
Meghasandesam

Film score by Ramesh Naidu
- Released: 1982
- Genre: Soundtrack
- Length: 56:38
- Label: SEA Records
- Producer: Ramesh Naidu

Ramesh Naidu chronology
Malle Pandiri (1982)	Meghasandesam (1982)	Bahudoorapu Batasari (1983)

The music for Meghasandesam was composed by Ramesh Naidu, with the soundtrack released under the SEA Records label. The film's music earned widespread recognition.

Meghasandesam received several accolades for its music. Ramesh Naidu won the National Award for Best Music Direction, while P. Suseela and K. J. Yesudas received the National Awards for Best Female Playback Singer and Best Male Playback Singer, respectively.

At the state level, the film won multiple Nandi Awards, including Best Music Director (Ramesh Naidu), Best Lyricist (Devulapalli Krishnasastri), Best Male Playback Singer (K. J. Yesudas), and Best Female Playback Singer (P. Suseela).

S.No	Song title	Lyrics	Singers	length
1	"Aakaasa Desaana"	Veturi	K. J. Yesudas	4:12
2	"Aakulo Aakunai"	Devulapalli Krishna Sastry	P. Susheela	4:15
3	"Mundu Telisena Prabhu"	Devulapalli Krishna Sastry	P. Susheela	4:21
4	"Navarasa Suma Maalika"	Veturi	K. J. Yesudas	4:00
5	"Ninnati Daaka Silanaina"	Veturi	P. Susheela	4:59
6	"Paadana Vani Kalyaniga"	Veturi	M. Balamuralikrishna	5:31
7	"Priye Charusheele"	Jayadeva	K. J. Yesudas, P. Susheela	4:39
8	"Radhika Krishna Radhika"	Jayadeva	K. J. Yesudas, P. Susheela	6:25
9	"Seetavela Raaneeyaku"	Devulapalli Krishna Sastry	K. J. Yesudas, P. Susheela	4:36
10	"Sigalo Avi Virulo"	Devulapalli Krishnasastri	K. J. Yesudas	4:26
11	"Poems"	Palagummi Padmaraju	K. J. Yesudas	9:14

== Awards ==
Meghasandesam won four honours at the 30th National Film Awards. The film also won nine state Nandi Awards.

- National Film Awards - 1982
  - National Film Award for Best Feature Film in Telugu - Dasari Narayana Rao
  - National Film Award for Best Music Direction -Ramesh Naidu
  - National Film Award for Best Female Playback Singer - P. Susheela
  - National Film Award for Best Male Playback Singer - K. J. Yesudas
- Nandi Awards - 1982
  - Best Feature Film - Gold- Dasari Narayana Rao
  - Best Actor - Akkineni Nageswara Rao
  - Best Actress - Jayaprada
  - Best Music Director - Ramesh Naidu
  - Best Lyricist -Devulapalli Krishnasastri
  - Best Male Playback Singer - K. J. Yesudas
  - Best Female Playback Singer - P. Susheela
  - Best Audiographer - A . R. Swaminadhan
  - Best Cinematographer - P.S. Selvaraj
- Filmfare Awards South
  - Filmfare Award for Best Film – Telugu - Dasari Narayana Rao (1982)
