= Dasari Narayana Rao =

Indian film director (1942–2017)

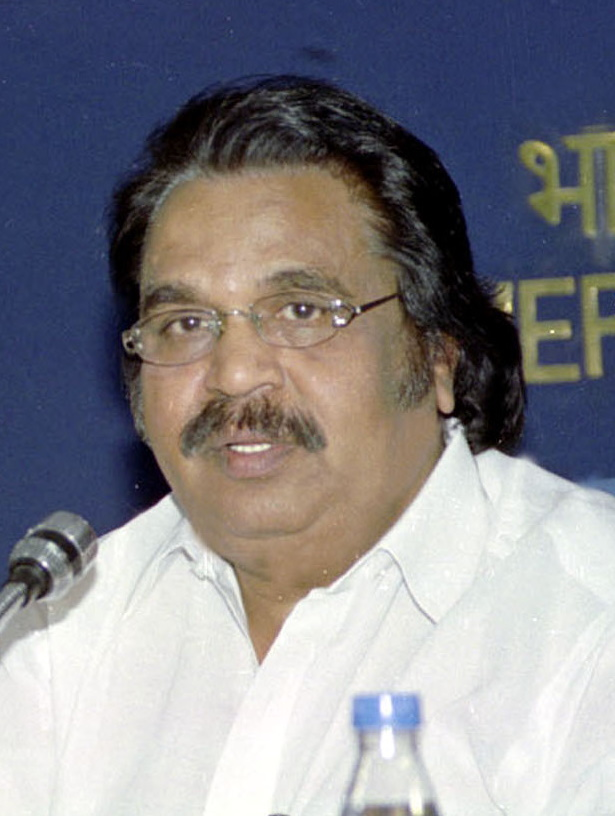
- Rao in 2005

Minister of State for Coal and Mines
- In office 23 May 2004 – 27 November 2004
- Prime Minister: Manmohan Singh
- Preceded by: Prahlad Singh Patel
- Succeeded by: Himself

Minister of State for Coal
- In office 27 November 2004 – 6 April 2008
- Prime Minister: Manmohan Singh
- Preceded by: Himself
- Succeeded by: Santosh Bagrodia

Member of Parliament, Rajya Sabha
- In office 3 April 2000 – 2 April 2012
- Constituency: Andhra Pradesh

Personal details
- Born: 4 May 1942 Palakollu, Madras Presidency, British India
- Died: 30 May 2017 (aged 75) Hyderabad, Telangana, India
- Party: Indian National Congress
- Spouse: Dasari Padma
- Children: 3 including Arun Kumar
- Occupation: Film director; producer; screenwriter; actor; lyricist; politician
- Awards: National Film Awards

Dasari Narayana Rao (4 May 1942 – 30 May 2017) was an Indian film director, screenwriter, actor, producer, lyricist, and politician, primarily known for his work in Telugu cinema. Over his four decade career, he directed more than 150 feature films, earning a Limca World Record for directing the most films in the world. He was known by the epithet "Darsaka Ratna" (transl. "Jewel among directors") and was recognized for addressing social issues such as gender discrimination, casteism, corruption and injustice through his films. Narayana Rao received numerous accolades, including two National Film Awards, 16 Nandi Awards including the Raghupathi Venkaiah Award, and five Filmfare Awards South including the Lifetime Achievement.

In addition to his work in Telugu cinema, Narayana Rao directed notable Hindi films like Swarg Narak (1978), Jyoti Bane Jwala (1980), Aaj Ka M.L.A. Ram Avtar (1984), Asha Jyoti (1984) and others. He directed works such as Tandra Paparayudu (1986), and Surigaadu (1992) which were screened at International Film Festival of India in the Panorama section, and Kante Koothurne Kanu (1998) which received the National Film Award Special Mention Feature Film in addition to a Kannada films. In 1983, he directed Meghasandesam which screened at the Indian Panorama, the Tashkent Film Festival, and the Moscow film festival. The film also won the National Film Award for Best Feature Film in Telugu. During his career he also acted in several Telugu and Tamil films.

He was elected to the Rajya Sabha in the year 2000 and served as the Minister of state for Coal in the Manmohan Singh government.

== Film career ==
Prior to films, Dasari worked in theatre staging plays. He entered film industry to become an actor but worked as ghost writer for 25 films and made his debut as dialogue writer with Jagath Jatteelu (1970) however it was Mohammed Bin Thuqlaq which gave him recognition.

== Political career ==
In the late 1990s, Dasari Narayana Rao announced plans to launch a regional political party in Andhra Pradesh called Telugu Talli Party. Dasari campaigned for the Indian National Congress (INC) during the 1996, 1998 and 1999 general elections. He was elected to the Rajya Sabha in the year 2000. He became the Minister of State for Coal. Said to be a confidante of Indian National Congress President Sonia Gandhi, Dasari once again became active in politics after INC came back to power in 2004.

On 11 June 2013 the Central Bureau of Investigation booked Dasari Narayana Rao for receiving ₹2.25 crores from Naveen Jindal in connection with the Coal scam, and filed FIR against both.

== Business ==
He launched a popular daily Telugu-language newspaper, Udayam, to counter the influence of Ramoji Rao's newspaper Eenadu.

== Death ==
Dasari Narayana Rao died on 30 May 2017 from prolonged illness, at the age of 75. His last rites were performed with full state honours. His funeral was held at his farmhouse in Moinabad village, Ranga Reddy district, where his wife Padma was cremated.

== Awards ==
National Film Awards

- Special Jury Award / Special Mention (Feature Film) – Kante Kuthurne Kanu – 1998
- National Film Award for Best Feature Film in Telugu – Meghasandesam – 1982 (As director and producer)

Filmfare Awards

- Special Jury Award - Swargam Narakam & Balipeetam (1975)
- Best Director – Gorintaku (1979)
- Best Director – Premabhishekam (1981)
- Best Film – Meghasandesam (1982)
- Lifetime Achievement (2001)

Nandi Awards

- NTR National Award
- Raghupathi Venkaiah Award - 1990
- Best Actor – Mestri (2009)
- Best Actor – Mamagaru (1991)
- Second Best Feature Film - Silver – Kante Kuthurne Kanu (1998)
- Best Director - Kante Koothurne Kanu (1998)
- Best Feature Film – Bangaru Kutumbam (1994)
- Best Feature Film – Meghasandesam (1982)
- Best Feature Film – Swargam Narakam (1975)
- Best Feature Film – Samsaram Sagaram (1973)
- Best Feature Film – Tata Manavadu (1972)
- Best Story -Samsaram Sagaram (1973)
- Best Story - Nanna Garu (1994)
- Best Story - Kante Kooturne Kanu (1998)
- Special Jury – Premabhishekam (1981)
- Best Dialogue Writer – M.L.A. Yedukondalu (1983)

CineMAA Awards

- Lifetime Contribution – 2003

Other honours

- Vamsee Berkeley, Kalasagar, Siromani, Madras Film Fans Awards and Cine Herald Awards
- Jyothi Chitra Super Director Award – six times
- Ancient Andhra Patrika Best Director Award – six times
- Allu Ramalingaiah Memorial Award
- Sobhan Babu first memorial award in 2009
- Bollimunta Sivaramakrishna Sahithi Kala Award-2016
- Doctorate "Kalaprapoorna" from Andhra University for his contribution to Telugu culture and Telugu cinema in 1986

== Filmography ==
=== As director, writer, and producer ===
Year	Film	Credited as			Language	Notes
Year	Film	Director	Writer	Producer	Language	Notes
1970	Oke Kutumbam	Associate			Telugu	
1971	Vintha Samsaram	Associate			Telugu	
1972	Mohammed-bin-Tughluq		Dialogues		Telugu	
1972	Hantakulu Devantakulu		Yes		Telugu	
1972	Matrimoorti		Yes		Telugu	
1973	Panjaramlo Pasipapa		Yes		Telugu	
1973	Thatha-Manavadu	Yes	Yes		Telugu	
1974	Samsaram Sagaram	Yes	Yes		Telugu	
1974	Bantrothu Bharya	Yes	Yes		Telugu	
1974	Evariki Vaare Yamuna Teere	Yes	Yes		Telugu	
1974	Radhamma Pelli	Yes	Yes		Telugu	
1974	Tirupati	Yes	Yes		Telugu	
1975	Swargam Narakam	Yes	Yes		Telugu	
1975	Balipeetam	Yes	Yes		Telugu	
1975	Bharatamlo Oka Ammayi	Yes	Yes		Telugu	
1975	Devude Digivaste	Yes	Yes		Telugu	
1976	Manushulanta Okkate	Yes	Yes		Telugu	
1976	Muddabanti Puvvu	Yes	Yes		Telugu	
1976	Thoorpu Padamara	Yes	Yes		Telugu	
1976	Yavvanam Katesindi	Yes	Yes		Telugu	
1976	Paadavoyi Bharateeyuda	Yes	Yes		Telugu	
1977	O Manishi Tirigi Choodu	Yes	Yes		Telugu	
1977	Bangarakka	Yes	Yes		Telugu	
1977	Chillarakottu Chittemma	Yes	Yes		Telugu	
1977	Idekkadi Nyayam	Yes	Yes		Telugu	
1977	Jeevitame Oka Natakam	Yes	Yes		Telugu	
1977	Kanya - Kumari	Yes	Yes		Telugu	
1978	Devadasu Malli Puttadu	Yes	Yes		Telugu	
1978	Katakatala Rudrayya	Yes	Yes		Telugu	
1978	Sivaranjani	Yes	Yes	Yes	Telugu	
1978	Swarag Narak	Yes	Yes		Hindi	
1979	Gorintaku	Yes	Yes		Telugu	
1979	Kalyani	Yes	Yes		Telugu	
1979	Korikale Gurralayite?	Yes	Yes		Telugu	
1979	Needa	Yes	Yes		Telugu	
1979	Peddillu Chinnillu	Yes	Yes		Telugu	
1979	Ravanude Ramudayithe?	Yes	Yes		Telugu	
1979	Rangoon Rowdy	Yes	Yes		Telugu	
1979	Kudi Edama Ayite		Yes		Telugu	
1980	Yeh Kaisa Insaf	Yes	Yes		Hindi	
1980	Jyoti Bane Jwala	Yes	Yes		Hindi	
1980	Bandodu Gundamma	Yes	Yes		Telugu	
1980	Buchi Babu	Yes	Yes		Telugu	
1980	Circus Ramudu	Yes	Yes		Telugu	
1980	Yedanthasthula Meda	Yes	Yes		Telugu	
1980	Ketugaadu	Yes	Yes		Telugu	
1980	Natchathiram	Yes	Yes		Tamil	
1980	Sardar Papa Rayudu	Yes	Yes		Telugu	
1980	Sita Ramulu	Yes	Yes		Telugu	
1980	Sujata			Yes	Telugu	
1981	Swapna	Yes	Yes		Telugu	
1981	Deeparadhana	Yes	Yes		Telugu	
1981	Paalu Neellu	Yes	Yes		Telugu	
1981	Srivari Muchatlu	Yes	Yes		Telugu	
1981	Viswaroopam	Yes	Yes		Telugu	
1981	Pyaasa Sawan	Yes	Yes		Hindi	
1981	Sangeeta	Yes	Yes		Telugu	
1981	Addala Meda	Yes	Yes		Telugu	
1981	Premabhishekam	Yes	Yes		Telugu	
1981	Prema Mandiram	Yes	Yes		Telugu	
1982	Bobbili Puli	Yes	Yes		Telugu	
1982	Golconda Abbulu	Yes	Yes		Telugu	
1982	Jayasudha	Yes	Yes	Yes	Telugu	
1982	Krishnarjunulu	Yes	Yes		Telugu	
1982	Mehndi Rang Layegi	Yes	Yes		Hindi	
1982	O Aadadi O Magadu	Yes	Yes		Telugu	
1982	Raaga Deepam	Yes	Yes		Telugu	
1982	Swayamvaram	Yes	Yes		Telugu	
1982	Yuvaraju	Yes	Yes		Telugu	
1982	Meghasandesam	Yes	Yes	Yes	Telugu	
1982	Bangaaru Koduku		Yes		Telugu	
1983	Prem Tapasya	Yes	Yes		Hindi	
1983	Bahudoorapu Batasari	Yes	Yes	Yes	Telugu	
1983	M.L.A. Yedukondalu	Yes	Yes		Telugu	
1983	Police Venkataswami	Yes	Yes		Telugu	
1983	Ramudu Kadu Krishnudu	Yes	Yes		Telugu	
1983	Rudrakali	Yes	Yes		Telugu	
1983	Oorantha Sankranthi	Yes	Yes		Telugu	
1984	Bhola Shankarudu	Yes	Yes		Telugu	
1984	Aaj Kaa M.L.A. Ram Avtar	Yes	Yes		Hindi	
1984	Asha Jyoti	Yes	Yes		Hindi	
1984	Haisiyat	Yes	Yes		Hindi	
1984	Yaadgaar	Yes	Yes		Hindi	
1984	Zakhmi Sher	Yes	Yes		Hindi	
1984	Abhimanyudu	Yes	Yes		Telugu	
1984	Jagan	Yes	Yes		Telugu	
1984	Justice Chakravarthy	Yes	Yes	Yes	Telugu	
1984	Police Papanna	Yes	Yes		Kannada	
1984	Yuddham	Yes	Yes		Telugu	
1985	Sarfarosh	Yes	Yes		Hindi	
1985	Wafadaar	Yes	Yes		Hindi	
1985	Brahma Mudi	Yes	Yes		Telugu	
1985	Edadugula Bandham	Yes	Yes		Telugu	
1985	Lanchavataram	Yes	Yes		Telugu	
1985	Pelli Meeku Akshintalu Naaku	Yes	Yes	Yes	Telugu	
1985	Tirugubatu	Yes	Yes		Telugu	
1986	Aadi Dampatulu	Yes	Yes		Telugu	
1986	Dharma Peetham Daddarillindi	Yes	Yes		Telugu	
1986	Tandra Paparayudu	Yes	Yes		Telugu	
1986	Ugra Narasimham	Yes	Yes	Yes	Telugu	
1986	Nampally Nagu		Yes		Telugu	
1987	Aatma Bandhuvulu	Yes	Yes		Telugu	
1987	Brahma Nayudu	Yes	Yes		Telugu	
1987	Majnu	Yes	Yes	Yes	Telugu	
1987	Nene Raju Nene Mantri	Yes	Yes		Telugu	
1987	Viswanatha Nayakudu	Yes	Yes		Telugu	
1987	Rotation Chakravarti		Yes	Yes	Telugu	
1987	Ayyappa Swami Janma Rahasyam			Yes	Telugu	
1988	Brahma Puthrudu	Yes	Yes		Telugu	
1988	Kanchana Sita	Yes	Yes		Telugu	
1988	Praja Pratinidhi	Yes	Yes		Telugu	
1988	Intinti Bhagavatam			Yes	Telugu	
1989	Lankeswarudu	Yes	Yes		Telugu	
1989	Black Tiger	Yes	Yes		Telugu	
1989	Naa Mogudu Naake Sontham	Yes	Yes		Telugu	
1989	Two Town Rowdy	Yes	Yes		Telugu	
1990	Abhisarika	Yes	Yes		Telugu	
1990	Mama Alludu			Yes	Telugu	
1991	Amma Rajinama	Yes	Yes		Telugu	
1991	Niyanta	Yes	Yes		Telugu	
1991	Ramudu Kadu Rakshasudu	Yes	Yes		Telugu	
1992	Ahankaari	Yes	Yes		Telugu	
1992	Surigaadu	Yes	Yes		Telugu	
1992	Subba Rayudi Pelli	Yes	Yes		Telugu	
1992	Venkanna Babu	Yes	Yes		Telugu	
1993	Santaan	Yes	Yes		Hindi	
1993	Akka Pettanam Chelleli Kapuram	Yes	Yes		Telugu	
1993	Kunti Putrudu	Yes	Yes		Telugu	
1993	Mama Kodalu	Yes	Yes		Telugu	
1994	Bangaru Kutumbam	Yes	Yes		Telugu	
1994	Nannagaaru	Yes	Yes		Telugu	
1995	Kondapalli Rattayya	Yes	Yes		Telugu	
1995	Maya Bazaar	Yes	Yes		Telugu	
1995	Orey Rikshaw	Yes	Yes	Yes	Telugu	
1996	Rayudugaru Nayudugaru	Yes	Yes	Yes	Telugu	
1997	Osey Ramulamma	Yes	Yes	Yes	Telugu	
1997	Rowdy Durbar	Yes	Yes	Yes	Telugu	
1998	Greeku Veerudu	Yes	Yes	Yes	Telugu	
1999	Pichodi Chetilo Raayi	Yes	Yes		Telugu	
2000	Adavi Chukka	Yes	Yes		Telugu	
2000	Kante Koothurne Kanu	Yes	Yes	Yes	Telugu	
2000	Sammakka Sarakka	Yes	Yes	Yes	Telugu	
2001	Chinna	Yes	Yes	Yes	Telugu	
2002	Kondaveeti Simhasanam	Yes	Yes	Yes	Telugu	
2002	Rifles	Yes	Yes	Yes	Telugu	
2003	Fools	Yes	Yes		Telugu	
2007	Aadivaram Aadavallaku Selavu		Yes		Telugu	
2007	Maisamma IPS		Yes		Telugu	
2008	Premabhishekam		Yes		Telugu	
2008	Adivishnu		Yes		Telugu	
2009	Mestri		Yes		Telugu	
2009	Bangaru Babu		Yes		Telugu	
2010	Young India	Yes	Yes		Telugu	Also choreographer
2011	Parama Veera Chakra	Yes	Yes		Telugu	
2014	Erra Bus	Yes	Screenplay	Yes	Telugu	

=== Actor ===
- Swargam Narakam (1975)
- Yavvanam Katesindi (1976)
- Sivaranjani (1978)
- Peddillu Chinnillu (1979)
- Bhola Shankarudu (1980)
- Paalu Neellu (1980)
- Addala Meda (1981)
- Jayasudha (1982)
- Swayamvaram (1982)
- Yuvaraju (1982)
- Bahudoorapu Batasari (1983)
- M.L.A. Yedukondalu (1983)
- Police Venkataswami (1983)
- Oorantaa Sankranti (1983)
- Jagan (1984)
- Police Papanna (1984)
- Lanchavataram (1985)
- Aatma Bandhuvulu (1987)
- Dabbevariki Chedu (1987)
- Rotation Chakravarti (1987)
- Intinti Bhagavatam (1988)
- Muthyamantha Muddu (1989)
- Naa Mogudu Naake Sontam (1989)
- Mama Alludu (1990)
- Chevilo Puvvu (1990) as himself
- Amma Rajinama (1991)
- Mamagaaru (1991)
- Seetharamayya gari Manavaralu (1991)
- Venkanna Babu (1992)
- Surigaadu (1992)
- Raguluthunna Bharatham (1992)
- Pellam Chaatuna Mogudu (1992)
- Parvatalu Panakalu (1992)
- Chinnalludu (1993)
- Mama Kodalu (1993)
- Ladies Special (1993)
- Mudhal Paadal (1993) Tamil
- Bangaru Kutumbam (1994)
- Nannagaaru (1994)
- Punya Bhoomi Naa Desam (1994)
- O Tandri O Koduku (1994)
- Kondapalli Rattaiah (1995)
- Maya Bazaar (1995)
- Orey Rikshaw (1995)
- Subhamastu (1995)
- Mayadari Kutumbam (1995)
- Madhya Taragati Mahabharatam (1995)
- Premaku Padi Sutralu (1995)
- Rayudugaru Nayudugaru (1996)
- Osey Ramulamma (1997)
- Hitler (1997)
- Rukmini (1997)
- Deergha Sumangalibhava (1998)
- Greeku Veerudu (1998)
- Subba Rajugaari Kutumbam (1998)
- Pichodi Chetilo Raayi (1999)
- Kante Koothurne Kanu (2000)
- Sammakka Sarakka (2000)
- Chinna (2001)
- Adhipathi (2001)
- Kondaveeti Simhasanam (2002)
- Fools (2003)
- Mestri (2009)
- Young India (2010)
- Jhummandi Naadam (2010)
- Parama Veera Chakra (2011)
- Pandavulu Pandavulu Tummeda (2014)
- Erra Bus (2014)

=== Lyricist ===
- Oke Kutumbam (1970)
- Manushulanta Okkate (1976)
- Buchchi Babu (1980)
- Sita Ramulu (1980)
- Viswaroopam (1981)
- Swapna (1981)
- Swayamvaram (1982)
- Yuvaraju (1982)
- Ramudu Kadu Krishnudu (1983)
- Yuddham (1984)
- Ugra Narasimham (1986)
- Manavudu Danavudu (1986)
- Majnu (1987)
- Brahma Puthrudu (1988)
- Lankeswarudu (1989)
- Surigaadu (1992)
- Greeku Veerudu (1998)
- Kante Koothurne Kanu (2000)
- Sammakka Sarakka (2000)
- Maisamma IPS (2007)

== Television ==
Director

- Vishwamitra (1989)
- Thoorpu Padamara (2007-2010)
- Abhishekam (2008-2017)
- Shivaranjani (2010-2011)
- Kumkuma Rekha (2010-2013)

Producer

- Abhishekam (ETV)
- Gokulamlo Sita (ETV)
