= List of people from Telangana =

The following is a list of notable people from Telangana.

== Award winners ==
=== Bharat Ratna ===
- Zakir Husain
- P. V. Narasimha Rao (2024)

=== Padma Vibhushan ===
- Ali Yavar Jung
- Mehdi Nawaz Jung
- Kaloji (1992)
- Ravi Narayana Reddy (1992)

=== Padma Bhushan ===
- Nawab Zain Yar Jung
- Zehra Ali Yavar Jung
- C. Narayanareddy
- C. H. Hanumantha Rao
- Haroon Khan Sherwani

=== Padma Shri Award ===
- Gajam Anjaiah, Arts
- Laxma Goud, Arts
- Sayyid Ahmedullah Qadri, Arts
- Mohammad Ahmed Zaki, Service

=== Dada Saheb Phalke Award ===
- Paidi Jairaj

=== Dronacharya Award ===
- Mohammad Ilyas Babar, athletics
- Syed Naeemuddin, football

=== Sahitya Akademi Award in Telugu ===
- Daasarathi Krishnamacharyulu, for his book Timiramotho Samaram (1974)
- Cingireddy Narayana Reddy, for his book Mantalu Manavudu (1973)
- Suravaram Pratap Reddy, for his social history book Andhrula Sanghika Charitamu (1955)

== Education ==
- Chukka Ramaiah, MLC and Telangana activist
- Prof. Kailasa Venkata Ramiah, founder vice-chancellor of Kakatiya University; former member of the UPSC
- Arjula Ramachandra Reddy, distinguished biologist; founder vice-chancellor of Yogi Vemana University; Fellow of the Indian Academy of Sciences, Bangalore

== Business/industry ==
- Jupally Rameswar Rao, My Home group
- Sashi Reddi, AppLabs

== Film industry ==
- Nag Ashwin, Indian film director and screenwriter
- Shabana Azmi, Indian actress
- Sampoornesh Babu, Indian film actor
- Shyam Benegal, Indian director and screenwriter
- Udaya Bhanu, Indian presenter and film actress
- Tharun Bhascker, Indian actor, director and film producer
- Chakri, musical artist
- Chandrabose, Lyricist in Telugu cinema
- Vijay Deverakonda, Indian actor and film producer
- Tabassum Hashmi, Indian actress
- Aditi Rao Hydari, Indian actress
- Puri Jagannadh, Indian film director and producer
- P. Jairaj, Indian actor
- Sekhar Kammula, Indian film director
- Vennela Kishore, Indian actor
- Dasarathi Krishnamacharya, poet and writer
- Nagesh Kukunoor, filmmaker and screenwriter
- Venu Madhav, Indian actor
- Dia Mirza, Indian actress
- Farah Naaz, Bollywood actress
- Sampath Nandi, film director
- C. Narayanareddy, writer and poet
- Nithiin Kumar Reddy, Indian actor
- Vamshi Paidipally, filmmaker
- Taapsee Pannu, actress
- Samantha Ruth Prabhu, actress
- Shashi Preetam, music director
- Priyadarshi, actor
- Dil Raju, Indian film producer and distributor
- Rahul Ramakrishna, actor and writer
- Thagubothu Ramesh, actor
- B. Narsing Rao, film director
- Kanta Rao, actor
- Kiran Rao, film director
- Reshma Rathore, model and actress
- M. Prabhakar Reddy, actor and writer
- Madhura Sreedhar Reddy, film director
- Nandini Reddy, actress
- Sankalp Reddy, film director
- Siva Reddy, actor
- Srinivasa Reddy, Indian actor
- Surender Reddy, film director
- Tanishq Reddy, film actor
- Sushmita Sen, actress
- Harish Shankar, film director
- N. Shankar, film director
- Nikhil Siddhartha, actor
- Vandemataram Srinivas, music director
- Rahul Sipligunj, Indian Playback singer and Pop artist
- Suddala Ashok Teja, poet and lyricist
- Ram Gopal Varma, Indian film director
- Sandeep Reddy Vanga, Indian film director and screenwriter

== Poets and writers ==
- Waheed Akhtar, Urdu poet, writer and one of the leading Muslim scholars and philosophers of the 20th century
- Vattikota Alwar Swamy
- Fani Badayuni, noted Urdu poet
- Rasamayi Balakishan, folk singer, poet and political activist
- Chandrabose
- Dasarathi (1925–1987), poet and political activist
- Gaddar, singer
- Suddala Hanmanthu, poet, best known for the Telugu folk song "Palletoori Pillagada"
- Agasthya Kavi
- Vajjala Shiva Kumar
- Rama Chandra Mouli
- Ampasayya Naveen
- Maharaja Sir Kishen Pershad, Urdu poet
- Bammera Pothana, one of the most acclaimed Telugu poets
- Suravaram Pratapareddy
- Bhadrachala Ramadasu or Kancherla Gopanna
- Dasaradhi Rangacharya
- Gummadi Vittal Rao, balladeer and Naxalite activist
- Kaloji Narayana Rao (1914–2002), poet and political activist
- Pamulaparthi Sadasiva Rao
- Varavara Rao
- Malliya Rechana (940 CE), Jain poet
- C. Narayana Reddy, Padma Shri and Padma Bhushan award recipient
- Gona Budda Reddy
- Nandini Sidda Reddy
- Sunkireddy Narayana Reddy
- Palkuriki Somanna
- Ande Sri
- Ayinampudi Srilakshmi, poet and writer
- Mallinātha Sūri
- Suddala Ashok Teja
- Goreti Venkanna, poet and folk singer
- Bulemoni Venkateshwarlu

== Politicians ==
- Tanguturi Anjaiah, ex-CM of Andhra Pradesh
- Renuka Chowdhury, former Union minister of State and member of numerous parliamentary committees
- Bandaru Dattatreya, Governor of Himachal Pradesh from 2019, ex-MP Sec-bad
- Ponnam Prabhakar Goud, ex-MP (15th Lok Sabha)
- Tadur Bala Goud, Champion of the Backward Class community; former Minister, MLA; twice an MP in 8th and 9th Lok Sabha
- V. Srinivas Goud, MLA, AP
- Ghazala Hashmi, Lieutenant Governor of Virginia
- Zakir Hussain,}} third President of India and former governor of Bihar
- Manda Jagannadham, MP (15th Lok Sabha)
- K. Kavitha, MP; founder and President of Telangana Jagruthi Samithi
- R. Krishnaiah, MLA, National backward caste president; officially announced CM candidate from TDP
- Ponnala Lakshmaiah, former president, Telangana Pradesh Congress Committee; ex-Minister of AP
- Madan Mohan, MLA
- Padmaja Naidu, founder of INC in the Hyderabad State, former governor of West Bengal
- Sarojini Naidu, first Indian woman to become the president of the Indian National Congress and the first woman governor (to United Provinces)
- Nagabhairava Jaya Prakash Narayana, founder of Lok Satta Party
- Akbaruddin Owaisi, MLA, Floor Leader in Telangana Assembly from AIMIM
- Asaduddin Owaisi, MP, president of AIMIM
- Etela Rajender, MLA
- Chukka Ramaiah, Ramaiah Academy, Educationalist, MLC
- Burgula Ramakrishna Rao, first elected Chief Minister of the Hyderabad State (Independent India)
- Jalagam Vengal Rao, ex-CM of Andhra Pradesh
- K. T. Rama Rao, MLA
- Kalvakuntla Chandrashekar Rao, former Chief Minister of Telangana State; founder of TRS/BRS;
- P. Muralidhar Rao, National General Secretary, BJP
- P. V. Narasimha Rao, ex-CM of AP and ninth Prime Minister of India
- T. Harish Rao, MLA
- Ramesh Rathod, ex-MP (15th Lok Sabha)
- Alimineti Madhava Reddy, ex-Home Minister of Andhra Pradesh
- Anumula Revanth Reddy, second Chief Minister of Telangana State
- C. Laxma Reddy, MLA Jadcherla, ex-Health Minister
- G. Kishan Reddy, MLA, president of the BJP, AP
- G. Sanjeeva Reddy, ex-MP Rajya Sabha, ex-Minister of labour
- Gutha Sukender Reddy, chairman of Telangana Legislative Council from 2019
- Jaipal Reddy, ex-MP (13th, 14th and 15th Lokh Sabha); Minister, GOI
- Komatireddy Raj Gopal Reddy, ex-MP (15th Lok Sabha)
- Komatireddy Venkat Reddy, ex-minister, AP
- Kunduru Jana Reddy, ex-Minister Panchayat Raj (2010), AP
- Marri Chenna Reddy, ex-CM of Andhra Pradesh
- Marri Shashidhar Reddy, MLA, member of the National Disaster Management Authority
- Naini Narshimha Reddy, ex-Home Minister of Telangana, MLC, TRS Party Senior Leader
- Ramreddy Damodar Reddy, MLA
- Revanth Reddy, MP, Malkajgiri
- Sabita Indra Reddy, ex-Education Minister of Telangana from 2019
- Suravaram Sudhakar Reddy, ex-MP, former General Secretary for the Communist Party of India
- P. Shiv Shankar, ex-MP, Union Law Minister - GOI
- Kadiyam Srihari, MP
- Konda Surekha, MLA, ex-Minister, AP
- G. Venkat Swamy, ex-MP (14th Lok Sabha); ex-Minister, GOI
- Gaddam Vivek Venkatswamy, ex-MP (15th Lok Sabha)
- Mallu Bhatti Vikramarka, MLA, Chief Whip for the Congress Party
- Rajeshwar Prasad, ex-officio Cabinet Minister, Guinea-Bissau

== Sport ==
=== Badminton ===
- Jwala Gutta
- Parupalli Kashyap
- Saina Nehwal
- P.V. Sindhu

=== Cricket ===
- Arshad Ayub, former India team player and manager
- Mohammad Azharuddin
- Abbas Ali Baig, player and coach of India Cricket Team
- Harsha Bhogle, popular cricket commentator and founder of cricbuzz.com
- Noel David, former Team India cricketer
- M. L. Jaisimha, Team India cricket player
- V. V. S. Laxman
- Pragyan Ojha
- Mithali Raj
- Kanwaljit Singh, multiple Ranji record-breaking all-rounder
- Mohammed Siraj, represented Team India in cricket
- Shivlal Yadav, former India team player

=== Hockey ===
- Mukesh Kumar, field hockey player

=== Other sports ===
- Abdul Basith, former captain of the Indian men's volleyball team
- Sania Mirza, tennis player
- Gagan Narang, shooter
- Nikhat Zareen, boxer

== News writers ==
- Suravaram Pratapareddy (1896–1953), social historian
- K. Sreenivas Reddy, Indian journalist
- Vattikota Alwar Swamy (1915–1961), Telugu writer, human rights activist, communist leader, journalist and publisher
- Suddala Ashok Teja, Tollywood lyric writer
- Arunodaya Vimala, balladeer and social activist

== Military chiefs ==
- Air Chief Marshal Denis La Fontaine, Chief of Staff, Indian Air Force, 1985–88
- Air Chief Marshal Idris Hasan Latif, Chief of Staff, Indian Air Force, 1978–81
- Air Chief Marshal Fali Homi Major, Chief of Staff, Indian Air Force, 2007–09

== Religious figures ==
- Kancherla Gopanna
- Mother Meera

== Lawyers ==
- Subodh Markandeya, Senior Advocate of the Supreme Court of India

== Other notable people ==
- Chakali Ailamma, revolutionary leader
- Komaram Bheem, 20th-century freedom fighter
- Gaddar, artist, singer, politician
- Suddala Hanumanthu, freedom fighter, writer, balladeer
- Kothapalli Jayashankar, professor and political activist
- Vani Kola, venture capitalist, co-founder of Kalaari Capital
- Kalvakuntla Kavitha, political activist, founder and president of Telangana Jagruthi Samithi
- Malik Motasim Khan, leader of Jamaat-e-Islami Hind
- Nerella Venu Madhav, often regarded as the father of Indian mimicry
- Diya Mirza, Miss Asia-Pacific pageant winner
- Vivek Oberoi, Hindi film actor
- V. Prakash, educational activist
- Chukka Ramaiah, educator
- Kalpana Ramesh
- Varavara Rao, poet
- Raavi Narayana Reddy, revolutionary, leader of CPI, parliamentarian
- Bholekar Srihari, painter, sculptor and printmaker
- Tabu, Hindi film actress, multiple national awards winner
- Suresh Venapally, mathematician known for his research work in algebra, Shanti Swarup Bhatnagar Award 2009

== See also ==
- Jaya Jaya He Telangana
- Telangana Language Day
