= Telugu Thalli =

Female personification of the Telugu people

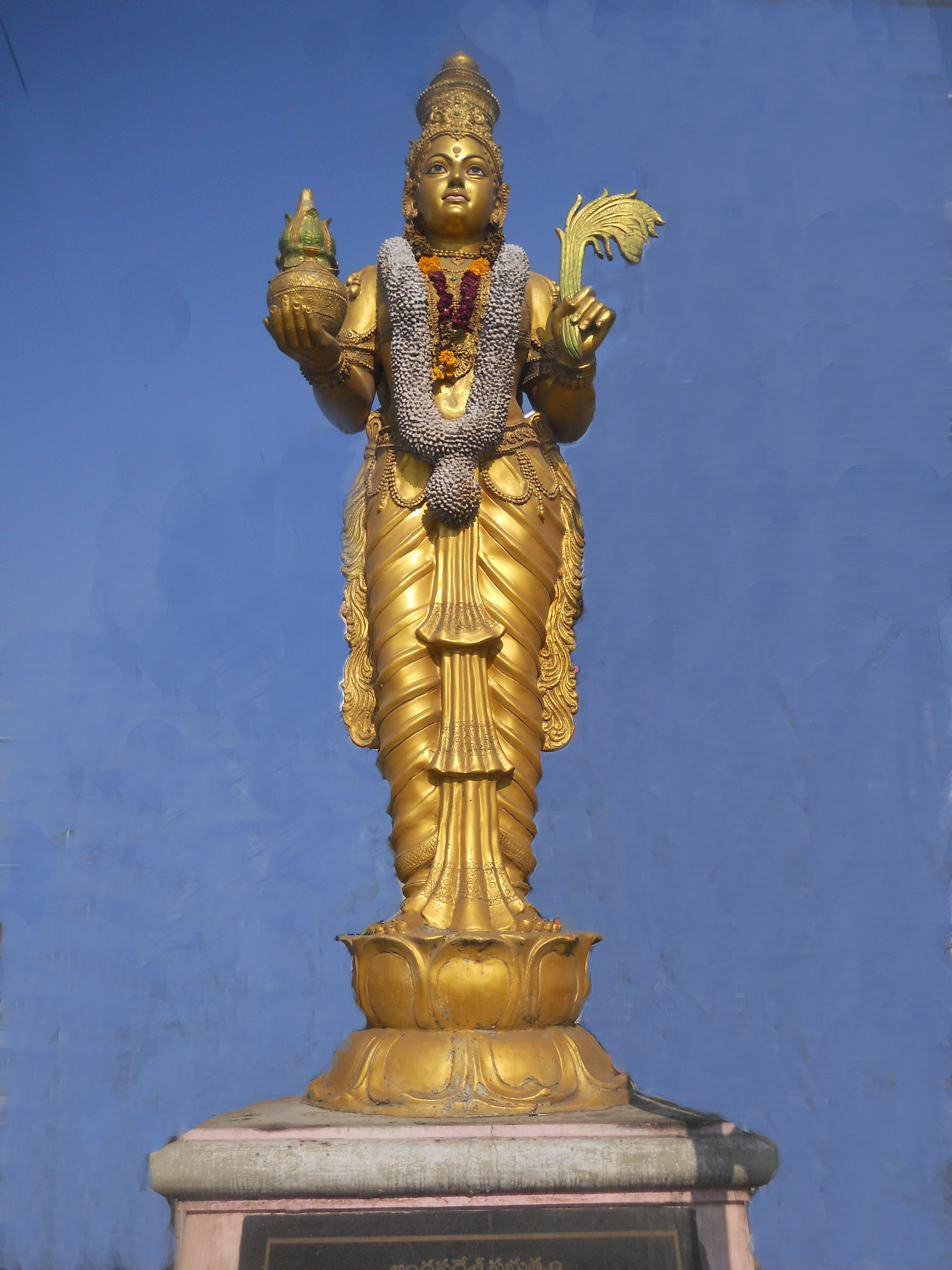
Statue of Telugu Thalli (తెలుగు తల్లి)

Telugu Thalli (Telugu: తెలుగుతల్లి; lit. 'Mother Telugu') is the personification of the Telugu people and their culture, depicted as a goddess symbolizing prosperity, tradition, and the importance of the Telugu language. Represented holding a harvest in her left hand to signify the region's agricultural abundance and prosperity, she carries a kalasam in her right hand, symbolizing the blessings and good fortune she brings to her people.

== Music ==
The patriotic song "Mā Telugu Talliki" ("To Our Mother Telugu") is the official state song of Andhra Pradesh, whose lyrics were written by Sankarambāḍi Sundarācāri for the 1942 Telugu film Deena Bandhu, which starred V. Nagayya.

== In popular culture ==
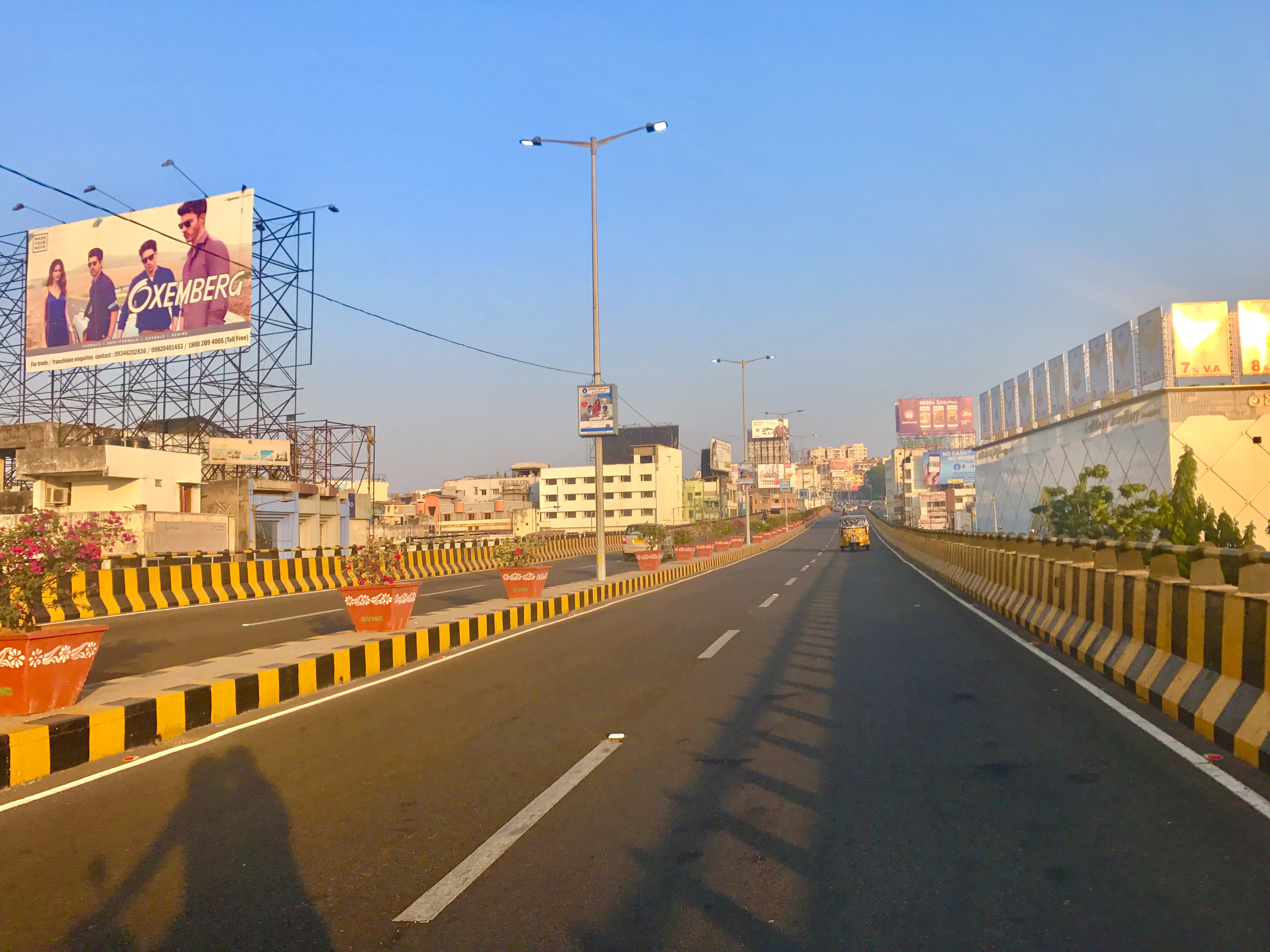
Telugu Thalli Flyover in Visakhapatnam

A remix of the original song was used in the 2010 film Leader, composed by Mickey J. Meyer.

== See also ==
- Bangamata
- Bharat Mata
- Sri Lanka Matha
- Tamil Thai
- Telangana Thalli
- Siam Devadhiraj
- Janani Janmabhumishcha Swargadapi Gariyasi
- Vande Mataram
