= Telangana Language Day =

Celebration of the Telangana language

- Date: 9 September
- Next time: 9 September 2026
- Frequency: Annual

Telangana Language Day is celebrated on 9 September every year in Telangana, India. This date was chosen on the occasion of renowned writer, poet of the Telangana Kaloji Narayana Rao's 100th birth anniversary. The Government of Telangana provides funds and awards for the improvement of Telangana language.

The Department of Culture organises the day on behalf of The Telangana Government. Shri Kaloji Narayana Rao, from Warangal district, wrote several poems, stories and novels about daily aspects of the common man's life. Kaloji Narayana Rao's "Naa Godava" is the most famous among all his writings.

== Kaloji Narayana Rao ==
Kaloji Narayana Rao (9 September 1914 (Madikonda) – 13 November 2000 (Warangal)

Spouse: Rukmini Bai

Awards: Padma Vibhushan

Better known as Kaloji or Kalanna, he was an Indian poet, freedom fighter, Anti-fascist and political activist of Telangana. He was a prolific writer and poet in Telugu, Urdu, Hindi, and Marathi. He was also a respected political activist who staunchly opposed the feudal attitude of Nizams. He was awarded the Padma Vibhushan in 1992.

Kaloji Narayana Rao's full name according to his SSC certificate is Raghuveer Narayan Srinivasan Kaloji.

Kaloji completed his primary education in Madikonda and higher education in Warangal and Hyderabad.

== Movements ==
Since his student days he was deeply influenced by the popular movements of the time like the Arya Samaj Movement, especially the civil rights part of it, the Library Movement and the Andhra Maha Sabha Movement. He was also part of Satyagraha movement, the Osmania University Student Vandemataram movement, Arya Samaj, State Congress, Andhra Mahasabha(Telangana) and Anti-Razakar movements. Kaloji took part in Andhra Maha Sabha activities since its formation in 1934. He was also associated with the Arya Samaj.

He actively participated in the freedom movement of the erstwhile Hyderabad State and underwent imprisonment under the Nizam. He has also participated in various social, political and literary activities in Andhra Pradesh. His active involvement with the masses and their problems and his tireless struggle for their emancipation have naturally earned him in equal measure the love of the people and the wrath of the powers that be. He is one of those select freedom fighters of our country who were imprisoned by the feudal lords and the alien rulers before the attainment of Indian Independence and also by the native leaders thereafter.

He has consistently fought for the democratic and responsible government. His commitment to human rights made him an active member of the Tarkunde Committee. Although opposed to power and the trapping of office Kaloji looked upon elections as a democratic exercise. He ran for public office three times and was elected once as a member of the legislative council. His most significant contest was in 1977 against Vengal Rao then Chief Minister who symbolised the 'emergency' rule in Andhra Pradesh.

== See also ==
- Jaya Jaya He Telangana
- List of Telangana poets
- Telugu years
