= Kaloji Kala Kshethram =

- కాళోజి కళా క్షేత్రం
- Location within Telangana

General information
- Type: Auditorium
- Location: Hanamkonda, Telangana, India
- Coordinates: 17.999622°N 79.563275°E
- Owner: Telangana government

Kaloji Kala Kshethram is a cultural convention center, that is being built in the memory of noted poet Kaloji Narayana Rao in Hanamkonda, Warangal.

== History ==
The foundation stone was laid by K. Chandrashekhar Rao in 2014 spans 4.2 acres on Hygreevachary grounds in Hanamkonda. However, the project was put on hold due to a lack of funds.

== Facilities ==
The convention center is being built on a three-acre lot, comprising a state-of-the-art auditorium with a seating capacity of 1,000 besides an art gallery, library, marriage hall and a lecture hall. The facilities can be leased by the general public for cultural programs.
