= Telugu =

Telugu may refer to:

- Telugu language, a major Dravidian language of South India
  - Telugu literature, is the body of works written in the Telugu language.
- Telugu people, an ethno-linguistic group of India
- Telugu script, used to write the Telugu language
  - Telugu (Unicode block), a block of Telugu characters in Unicode

== See also ==
- Telugu cinema
- Telugu cuisine
- Telugu states
- "Ma Telugu Talliki", state song of Andhra Pradesh, India
