= Mouli =

Mouli or Mauli may refer to:

== People ==
- Samuel "Mouli" Cohen (born 1958), Israeli entrepreneur
- Mouli Ganguly (born 1982), Indian actress in Hindi and Bengali cinema
- T. S. B. K. Moulee, Indian film director and actor
- Rama Chandra Mouli (born 1950), Indian writer
- Mauli Dave, Indian singer, actress, dancer, and television host

== Other uses ==
- Mauli, a dynasty of kings in Sumatra
- Mauli (film), a 2018 Indian film
- Mauli (thread), a Hindu ritual item
- Mouli grater, a kitchen utensil
- Mouli Island, one of the Loyalty Islands in New Caledonia
- Mouli, Punjab, a village in Phagwara tehsil, Punjab, India
- Mauli Halt railway station, Punjab, India
- mooli, sometimes spelled mouli or moolie, an Indian white radish.

== See also ==
- Moulis (disambiguation)
