= Jaya Jaya He Telangana =

State song of Telangana, India

Jaya Jaya Hē Telangāṇa
English: Victory to Telangana
- జయ జయహే తెలంగాణ
- Emblem of Telangana
- State Song of Telangana, India
- Lyrics: Ande Sri
- Adopted: 4 February 2024 (2 years ago) (officially)
- Preceded by: "Mā Telugu Talliki" (until 16 March 2021)

"Jaya Jaya Hē Telangāṇa" is the state song of Telangana. It was composed by Ande Sri. The song was adopted by many organisations and schools in Telangana during the Telangana movement, replacing "Maa Telugu Talliki". On 16 March 2021, in the Telangana State Assembly, Chief Minister K. Chandrashekhar Rao clarified that Jaya Jaya He Telangana had not been officially adopted as the state song of Telangana. Jaya Jaya He Telangana was officially adopted as the state song of Telangana by the Revanth Reddy cabinet on 4 February 2024.

== Lyrics ==
Telugu original

జయ జయహే తెలంగాణ జననీ జయకేతనం
ముక్కోటి గొంతుకలు ఒక్కటైన చేతనం
తరతరాల చరితగల తల్లీ నీరాజనం
పది జిల్లల నీ పిల్లలు ప్రణమిల్లిన శుభతరుణం
జై తెలంగాణ – జై జై తెలంగాణ!

పోతనది పురిటిగడ్డ, రుద్రమది వీరగడ్డ
గండరగండడు కొమురం భీముడే నీ బిడ్డ
కాకతీయ కళాప్రభల కాంతిరేఖ రామప్ప
గొలుకొండ నవాబుల గొప్ప వెలుగే చార్ మినార్
జై తెలంగాణ – జై జై తెలంగాణ!

జానపద జన జీవన జావలీలు జాలువారే
కవి గాయక వైతాళిక కళలా మంజీరాలు
జాతిని జాగృత పరిచే గీతాల జన జాతర
అనునిత్యం నీ గానం అమ్మ నీవే మా ప్రాణం
జై తెలంగాణ – జై జై తెలంగాణ!

గొదావరి కృష్ణమ్మలు మన బీళ్ళకు మళ్ళాలి
పచ్చని మాగాణాల్లో పసిడి సిరులు పండాలి
సుఖశాంతుల తెలంగాణ సుభిక్షంగా ఉండాలే
స్వరాష్ట్రమై తెలంగాణ స్వర్ణ యుగం కావాలి
జై తెలంగాణ – జై జై తెలంగాణ!

Romanisation of Telugu

Jaya jayahē telangāṇa jananī jayakētanaṃ
Mukkōṭi gontukalu okkaṭaina cētanaṃ
Taratarāla caritagala tallī nīrājanaṃ
Padi jillala nī pillalu praṇamillina shubhataruṇaṃ
Jai Telangāṇa – jai jai Telangāṇa!

Pōtanadi puriṭigaḍḍa, rudramadi vīragaḍḍa
Gaṇḍaragaṇḍaḍu komuraṃ bhīmuḍē nī biḍḍa
Kākatīya kaḷāprabhala kāntirēkha rāmappa
Golukoṇḍa navābula goppa velugē cār minār
Jai Telangāṇa – jai jai Telangāṇa!

Jānapada jana jīvana jāvalīlu jāluvārē
Kavi gāyaka vaitāḷika kaḷalā manjīrālu
jātini jāgr̥ta paricē gītāla jana jātara
Anunityaṃ nī gānaṃ amma nīvē mā prāṇaṃ
Jai Telangāṇa – jai jai Telangāṇa

Godāvari kriṣṇammalu mana bīḷḷaku maḷḷāli
Paccani māgāṇāllō pasiḍi sirulu paṇḍāli
Sukhashāntula Telangāṇa subhikṣaṅgā uṇḍālē
svarāṣṭrramai Telangāṇa svarṇa yugaṁ kāvāli
Jai Telangāṇa – jai jai Telangāṇa

IPA transcription

[d͡ʒa.ja d͡ʒa.ja.ɦeː t̪e.laŋ.ɡaː.ɳa d͡ʒa.na.niː d͡ʒa.ja.keː.t̪a.nam̃ |]
[muk̚.koː.ʈi ɡon̪.t̪u.ka.lu ok̚.ka.ʈaɪ̯.na t͡ʃeː.t̪a.nam̃ |]
[t̪a.ɾa.t̪a.ɾaː.la t͡ʃa.ɾi.t̪a.ɡa.la t̪al.liː niː.ɾaː.d͡ʒa.nam̃ |]
[pa.d̪i d͡ʒil.la.la niː pil.la.lu pɾa.ɳa.mil.li.na sʰu.bʱa.t̪a.ɾu.ɳam̃ |]
[d͡ʒaɪ̯ t̪e.laŋ.ɡaː.ɳa | d͡ʒaɪ̯ d͡ʒaɪ̯ t̪e.laŋ.ɡaː.ɳa ‖]

[poː.t̪a.na.d̪i pu.ɾi.ʈi.ɡaɖ.ɖa | ɾu.d̪ɾa.ma.d̪i ʋiː.ɾa.ɡaɖ.ɖa |]
[ɡaɳ.ɖa.ɾa.ɡaɳ.ɖa.ɖu ko.mu.ɾam̃ bʱiː.mu.ɖeː niː biɖ.ɖa |]
[kaː.ka.t̪iː.ja ka.ɭaː.pɾa.bʱa.la kaːn̪.t̪i.ɾeː.kʰa ɾaː.map̚.pa |]
[ɡo.lu.koɳ.ɖa na.ʋaː.bu.la ɡop̚.pa ʋe.lu.ɡeː t͡ʃaːɾ mi.naːɾ |]
[d͡ʒaɪ̯ t̪e.laŋ.ɡaː.ɳa | d͡ʒaɪ̯ d͡ʒaɪ̯ t̪e.laŋ.ɡaː.ɳa ‖]

[d͡ʒaː.na.pa.d̪a d͡ʒa.na d͡ʒiː.ʋa.na d͡ʒaː.ʋa.liː.lu d͡ʒaː.lu.ʋaː.ɾeː |]
[ka.ʋi ɡaː.ja.ka ʋaɪ̯.t̪aː.ɭi.ka ka.ɭa.laː man.d͡ʒiː.ɾaː.lu |]
[d͡ʒaː.t̪i.ni d͡ʒaː.ɡɾu.t̪a pa.ɾi.t͡ʃeː ɡiː.t̪aː.la d͡ʒa.na d͡ʒaː.t̪a.ɾa |]
[a.nu.nit̪.jam̃ niː ɡaː.nam̃ am.ma niː.ʋeː maː pɾaː.ɳam̃ |]
[d͡ʒaɪ̯ t̪e.laŋ.ɡaː.ɳa | d͡ʒaɪ̯ d͡ʒaɪ̯ t̪e.laŋ.ɡaː.ɳa ‖]

[ɡo.d̪aː.ʋa.ɾi kɾiʂ.ɳam.ma.lu ma.na biːɭ.ɭa.ku maɭ.ɭaː.li |]
[pat̚.t͡ʃa.ni maː.ɡaː.ɳaːl.loː pa.si.ɖi si.ɾu.lu paɳ.ɖaː.li |]
[su.kʰa.sʰaːn̪.t̪u.la t̪e.laŋ.ɡaː.ɳa su.bʱik.ʂaŋ.ɡaː uɳ.ɖaː.leː |]
[sʋa.ɾaːʂ.ʈɾa.maɪ̯ t̪e.laŋ.ɡaː.ɳa sʋaɾ.ɳa ju.ɡam̃ kaː.ʋaː.li |]
[d͡ʒaɪ̯ t̪e.laŋ.ɡaː.ɳa | d͡ʒaɪ̯ d͡ʒaɪ̯ t̪e.laŋ.ɡaː.ɳa ‖]

English translation

Victory to thee, Mother Telangana, victory to thy flag
Thy bodhi led to three crore voices
O Mother, victory to thy history of many eras
A victory brought by thy progeny of ten districts
Victory to Telangana – victory, victory to Telangana!

Land of great Pothana, realm of brave Rudramma
Of top of all thy son Komaram Bheem most valiant
The fine glint of Kakatiya and of Ramappa
Charminar serves as the pinnacle of great Golconda
Victory to Telangana – victory, victory to Telangana!

Folklore is the javelin of life
Manjeera as the poet's choral art
Like an acumen of songs, while ensuring fair
Mother, always in our passion of carol you are
Victory to Telangana – victory, victory to Telangana!

Godavari and Krishna shall be in our blood
Green veins shall be grown in green lands
May prosperous Telangana prosper even more
This independent Telangana needs a golden age
Victory to Telangana – victory, victory to Telangana!

== See also ==
- Telangana Thalli
- Telangana Language Day
- List of Telangana poets
- List of Indian state songs
