= Telangana Vimochana Samithi =

Telangana Vimochana Samithi is a non-political organisation fighting for the statehood of Telangana. Its founders are V. Prakash and Dileep Kumar.

== History ==
Telangana Vimochana Samithi was formed in June 2009 after V. Prakash and Dileep Kumar broke away from TRS party.
