= Vattikota Alwar Swamy =

Vattikota Alwar Swamy (1 November 1915 – 5 February 1961) was a Telugu writer, human rights activist, communist leader, journalist and publisher. The first novelist in Telugu. He is an uncle of Dr. Dhasharathi Rangacharya.

== Early life ==
He was born in Cheruvu Madaram Kalan (village) (shaligouraram mandal) village of Nalgonda district on 1 November 1915. His parents were Machavaram Simhadramma and Ramachandra Charyulu. As his father died when he was young, he completed his education while working as cook for his teacher Seetharama Rao.

== Life ==
He was active in the library movement and the communist movement, and he fought against the Nizam government. His activities angered Nizam and he was jailed. His book about his experience in Vattkota jail, Jailu Lopala (Inside Jail), was published. His other works include novels Prajala Manishi (People's Man) (1952) and Gangu (1940–45). He was also president of the Nalgonda district unit of Andhra Mahasabha for some time.

To inspire and educate the people of Telangana, he established Deshoddaraka Granthamala and published 35 books. He also published a newspaper called Telangana.

He died on 5 February 1961.
