= Moulis =

Moulis may refer to:

== Places ==
- Moulis, Ariège, a French commune in the department of Ariège
- Moulis, Tarn-et-Garonne, an ancient French commune in Tarn-et-Garonne, today part of Reyniès
- Moulis-en-Médoc, French commune in the department of Gironde

== People ==
- Danny Moulis (born 1960), Australian footballer
- Pavel Moulis (born 1991), Czech footballer

== Other uses ==
- Moulis-en-Médoc AOC, a red wine appellation in Bordeaux, situated around the commune Moulis-en-Médoc

== See also ==
- Mouli (disambiguation)
