= Ande Sri =

Indian poet and lyricist (1961–2025)

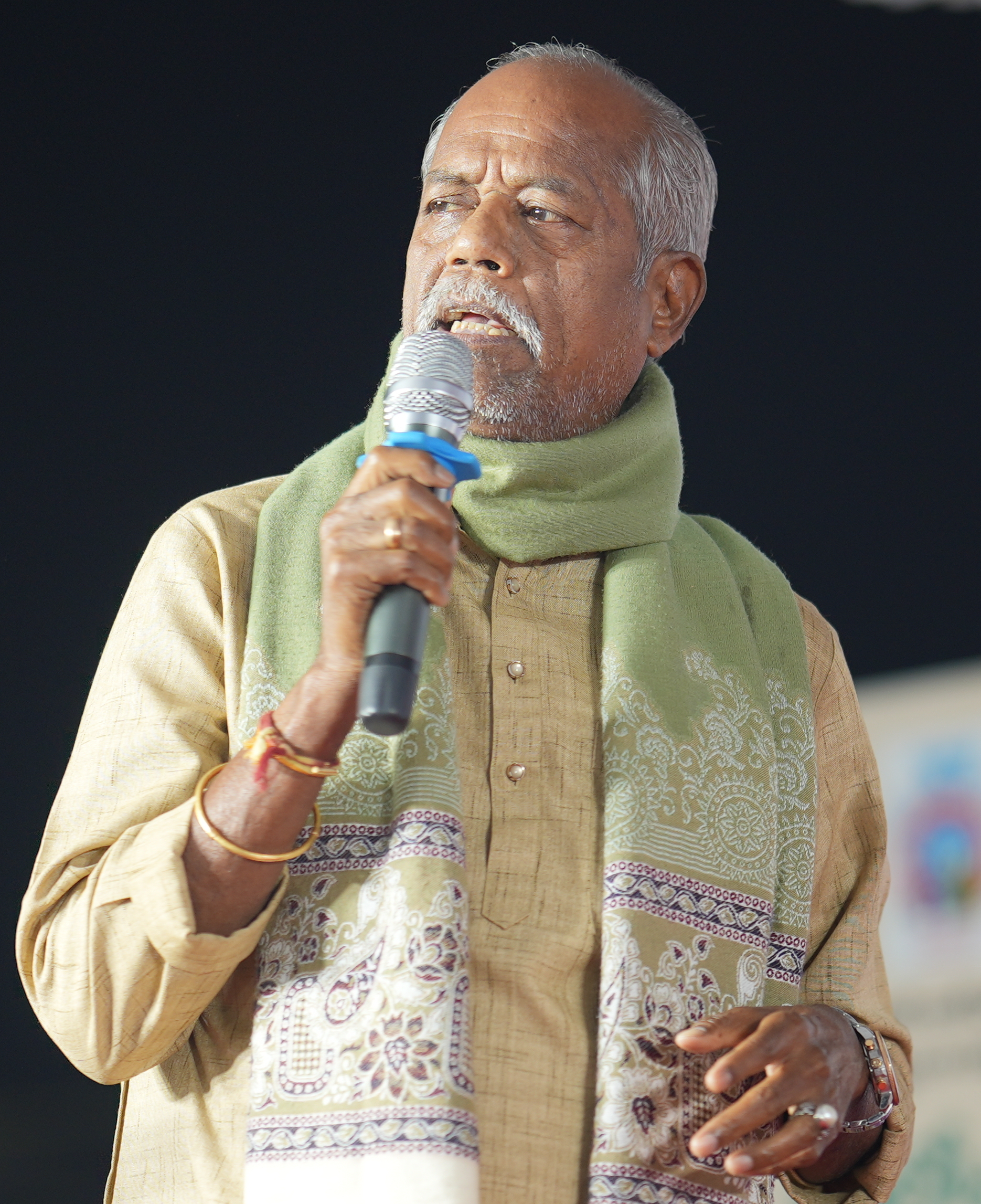
- Born: Ande Yellanna; 18 July 1961; Rebarthi, Siddipet district, Andhra Pradesh, India
- Died: 10 November 2025 (aged 64); Hyderabad, Telangana, India
- Occupations: Poet, lyricist

Ande Yellanna (18 July 1961 – 10 November 2025), also known under the pen name Ande Sri, was an Indian poet and lyricist.

== Early life and career ==
Ande Yellanna was born in Rebarthi, Siddipet district on 18 July 1961. Growing up as an orphan, he had a difficult childhood. He did not know who his parents were or where his hometown was. Sri worked as a shepherd for some time to make a living. From there he started writing poetry. He did not study any kind of education. Apart from numerous songs, he also composed 3,000 poems. He received an honorary doctorate from Kakatiya University.

=== Role in Telangana Movement ===
Andhe Sri played a prominent role in the Telangana movement; Capturing the aspirations of the people who wanted a separate Telangana state, his songs became rallies for activists. His most notable contribution was writing the official state anthem of Telangana "Jaya Jaya Hey Telangana, Janani Jaya Kethanam", which was adopted by the government in February 2024.

== Death ==
Sri died from a heart attack in Gandhi Hospital in Hyderabad, on 10 November 2025, at the age of 64.

== Honours and awards ==
Sri wrote the song Maayamai Pothundamma Manishanavadu for the film Erra Samudram. The Andhra Pradesh University's syllabus committee included it in the Telugu second year graduation text books for the academic year starting in 2009. This is the third song to feature in Telugu syllabi after Maa Telugu Thalliki and Telugu Jathi Manadi in the 77 years of Telugu cinema.

Kakatiya University conferred Sri with an honorary doctorate for his contribution as a lyricist.

He was awarded a cash award of ₹1 crore at Telangana Formation Day celebrations in Parade Grounds, Secunderabad on 2 June 2025 for his contributions to the Telangana movement.

- Sri won Nandi Award for Best Lyricist - Ganga (2006)
- For playing a key role in the Telangana movement, Andesri received a cash award of Rs 1 crore from Chief Minister On February 1, 2014, the Academy of Universal Global Peace in Washington DC honored him with an honorary doctorate with the title of World Poet.
- Dasarathi Sahitya Puraskar by Vamsi International Foundation (August 14, 2015)
- Dr. Ravuri Bharadwaja, Jnanpith Award recipient of Dr. Ravuri Bharadwaja Literary Award by Ravuri Kanthamma Trust (5 July 2015)
- Suddala Hanuman-Janakamma National Award, Sundarayya Vigyan Kendra, 15th October, 2022
- Dasarathi Krishnamacharya Literary Award-2024
- Lok Nayak Award - 2024

== Notable works ==
- "Jaya Jaya He Telangana, Janani Jaya Kethanam" (Telangana State Anthem)
- "Palle neeku Vandanamulammo"
- "Maayamai pOtunnadamma.. manishannavAdu"
- "Gala Gala Gajjalabandi"
- "Komma chekkite bommarA.. kolichi mokkithe ammara"
