= Gajam Anjaiah =

Indian master handloom designer (born 1955)

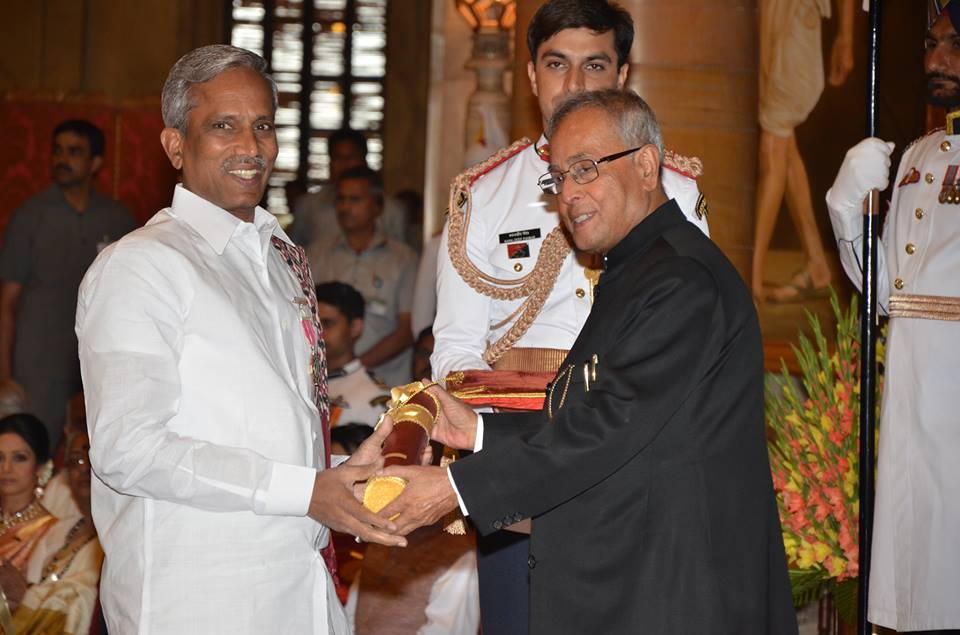
- The Government of India conferred Gajam Anjaiah, Padma Shri award in the year 2013.
- Born: 16 May 1955 (age 71); Puttapaka, Nalgonda district, Telangana, India
- Occupation: Handloom designer
- Known for: Puttapaka Tie and Dye

Gajam Anjaiah, an Indian master handloom designer, who is widely recognised in the handloom industry for his innovations and developments of Tie and Dye handloom products along with Telia Rumal technique of weaving based on Ikat tie-dye process. He received Padma Shri from Government of India under Art category in 2013. He is known for his excellence in traditional handloom design works, such as Puttapaka Sarees in Tie and dye skill, that is the traditional art of designing on paper and then transferring it on to cloth. His dedication to the Handloom Industry has kept the Indian tradition of weaving alive, brought livelihood to the weavers and gave exclusive/unique designed handloom products to the people in India.

== Early life and family ==
He was born on 16 May 1955, in a Padmashali community in Puttapaka village, Narayanpur mandal in Nalgonda district, Telangana to Narasimha, also a textile designer, who is credited with bringing Telia Rumal to his community from Chirala. The traditional Telia Rumals are produced by him in its original and traditional methods since its inception by his father in the Puttapaka village. Gajam Anjaiah married Anasuya and they have three sons, Ramesh, Murali and Shravan and one daughter, Dhanalaxmi.

== Career ==
He started his career in the late 1970s. He received many awards for his design skills. He designs for other weavers in Nalgonda and Mahbubnagar districts. His specialisation is in sarees such as Puttapaka, Kanchi, Dharmavaram, Benaras, Coimbatore, Uppada and Venkatagiri.

During the process of learning handloom weaving, Gajam Anjaiah came across social, economical and professional problems faced by the handloom weavers and he made up his mind to bring the smile on their faces while they work and ensure them with better living standards to the extent possible. Some of the weavers of Tie & Dye weaving process in different villages like Puttapaka, Chandur, Ghattupal, Koratikallu, Narsinghbatla, Munugodu of Nalgonda District and Amangal in Mahboobnagar District are attracted for his exclusive creations, developments, unique design products and continued to work under his guidance.

The recent innovations of Gajam Anjaiah are production of cotton saree with 16 Auspicious Symbols depicted in the Literature of Jainism. Each symbol in the design carries special effect, which brings religious significance to the saree, which can be worn during important festivals and religious occasions. Another recent innovative Tie and Dye cotton saree is with 108 Astrological Symbols which has much more intricate designs. Each Astrological Symbol is depicted in a size of 2.25-inch space with very minute details. The total process of transforming the paper design to fabric is much more laborious and requires high degree of skill, is taken care by Anjaiah himself in this regard.

He has imparted training to many weavers in the village of Chundur in Nalgonda district and in the village of Amangal in Mahboobnagar District in learning designing/weaving of the famous varieties like Gadwal & Tie and Dye combination, traditional Kancheevaram, Uppada and Kota sarees production. All these weavers are engaged for their regular employment and earning higher wages at present. Anjaiah apart from providing regular employment to 200 weavers’ families in Nalgonda and Mahboobnagar Districts, he has also contributed donations to some of the choultrys of weavers’ community at Srisailam, Bhadrachalam and Tirupathi.

He has participated in several handloom exhibitions such as Suraj Kund Mela held at Haryana in Feb 1990, Pravinya Exhibition organized by Crafts Council of Andhra Pradesh in September 1991, An exhibition and seminar on Handlooms/Handicrafts conducted by Annalaxmi National Museum in Singapore on two occasions i.e. on 18 December 2003 and 26 February 2004, 33rd World Crafts Councils – APR Regional Meeting in Dauge, South Korea on 19 October 2011. He has also met relevant dignitaries/officers and presented the problems of handloom weavers and suggested possible solutions.

Gajam Anjaiah participated in Pagnes & Sari exhibition at the Blue Penny Museum, Mauritius on 5 November 2013. The exhibition attracted many tourists and local people in Mauritius. The Fashion and Design Institute students of Mauritius also paid visit to the exhibition and enquired about various weaving techniques of Handloom products. The exhibition was marked by the presence of Mrs. Purryag (the First Lady of Mauritius), Mr. T. P. Seetharam (the High Commissioner of India in Mauritius), Mrs. Martin (the Minister of Gender Equality, Child Development and Family Welfare) and Mr. Richon (the Curator of Blue Penny Museum).

He has participated in India Unlimited event 2014 (a platform which aims to connect India and Sweden) organised in Stockholm, Sweden, where he has exhibited his weaving techniques and his handloom textile products. Several visitors, Government officials of Sweden and Ms. Banashri Bose Harrison, Indian Ambassador in Sweden, interacted with Gajam Anjaiah.

In 2016, he participated in India Textile - Handloom Exhibition held at Rome on 7 July and Anzio on 9 July organised by Handloom Export Promotion Council. The event was co-ordinated by Embassy of India, Rome, Italy. The Secretary (Textiles), Ministry of Textiles, Government of India and the Ambassador of India inaugurated the India Textile - Handloom Exhibition.

Padmanjali, A new saree / fabric (fusion of Ikat and Kanchi) innovated by Shri Gajam Anjaiah is generating employment for many weavers.

== Awards and honours ==
Gajam Anjaiah is the recipient of numerous certificates and awards. He received several Appreciation Certificates by a few important personnel hailing from Loksabha/Rajyasabha/Vidhaan Sabha/Vidhana Parishath and some other higher officials. He received Appreciation Certificate by Surajkund Crafts Mela, Haryana and also a Certificate for his participation in the special exhibition for celebration of golden jubilee of Indian Independence held at Dilli Haat in 1997.

He received National Award for his best Craftmanship in Teliya Rumal saree in 1987. He received Sant Kabir for his contribution to the Handloom Industry in the year 2010. The Government of India conferred on him Padma Shri in the year 2013.
