= Sankarambadi Sundaraachari =

Indian writer and poet

Sankarambadi Sundarachari
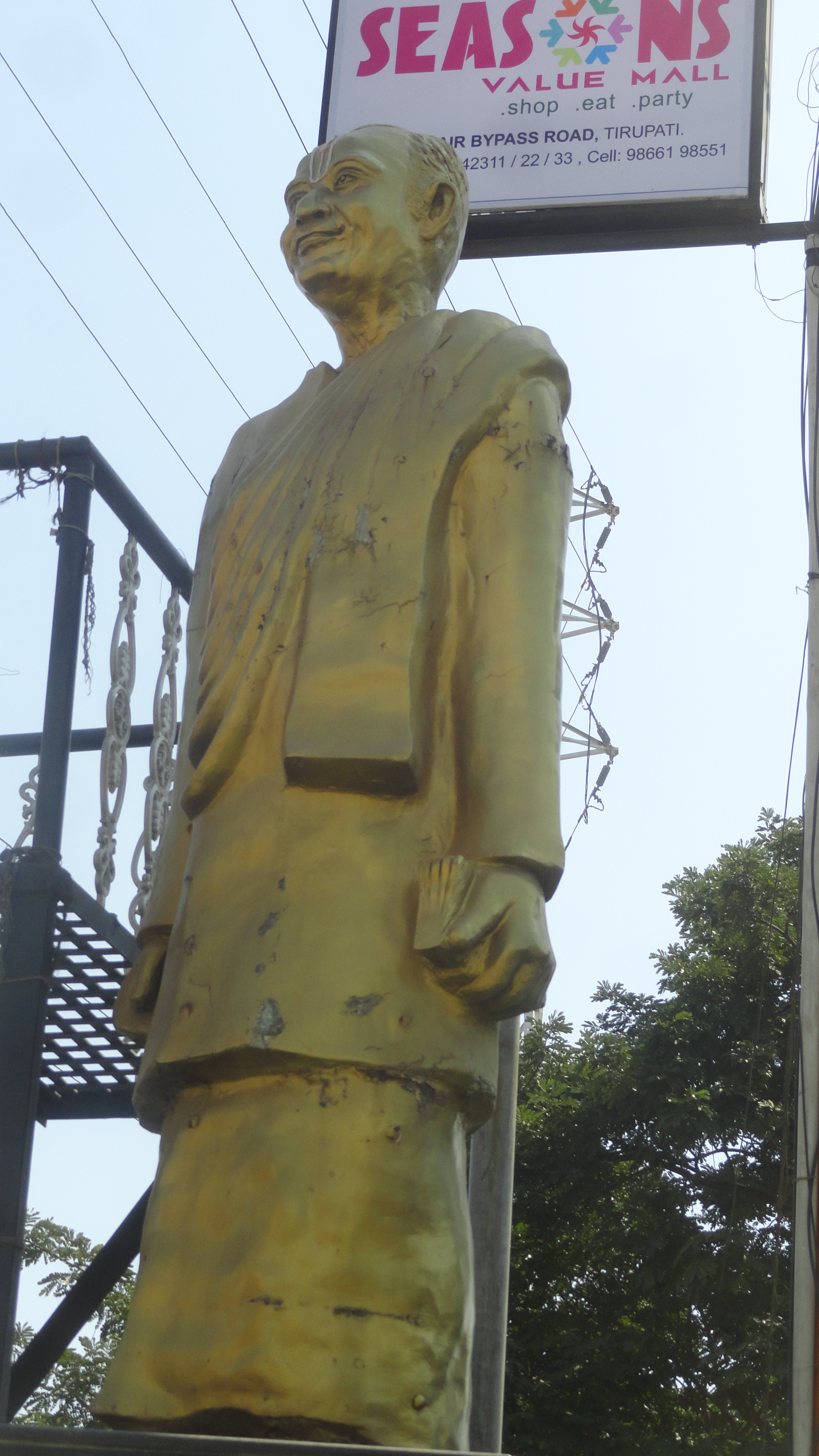
- Statue of Samkarambadi Sundaracharya, Tirupati
- Born: 10 August 1914; Tiruchanur, Madras Presidency, British India
- Died: 8 April 1977 (aged 62); Tirupati, Andhra Pradesh, India
- Occupations: Poet, writer
- Spouse: Vedammal
- Writing career
- Notable work: Ma Telugu Talliki

Sankarambadi Sundarachari (Telugu: Shankarambāḍi Sundarācāri; born 10 August 1914 – died 8 April 1977) was an Indian writer and poet in the Telugu language, although of Tamil origin. He was the writer of the official state song of Andhra Pradesh, Ma Telugu Talliki (lit. 'To Our Mother Telugu').

== Early life ==
Sankarambadi Sundarachari was born on 10 August 1914 in a Tamil family at Tiruchanur, near Tirupati Madras Presidency, British India. Though his roots are in Hindu religious traditions, he used to protest certain rituals he perceived to be superstitions. However, he liked to study Sanskrit and Telugu at TTD High school, Tirupati. While studying high school final (S.S.C), atheism had more of an influence on him. This antagonised his parents and in a conflict, came out of his house to live on his own. He spent his life in utter poverty with doing odd jobs.

== Life ==
After moving out of his parents house, for sustenance, he worked as a waiter at a Hotel.

He got disillusioned with the petty jobs and wanted to test his luck at Andhra Patrika, a Telugu daily newspaper, whose editor was freedom fighter Kasinathuni Nageswara Rao. Kasinathuni was impressed with Sankaram and offered him a job. Sankaram joined the daily, but soon he could not continue there and resigned due to his overt independent attitude. Sankaram then decided to continue his education and completed B.A (Bachelor of Arts). He applied for 'Inspector of School education' and was selected for the post and the initial posting was in Chittor. His sincerity got him good name and popularity. However his profound love for Telugu language, poetry made him to focus more on it.

=== Literary career ===
In 1942, he penned Maa Telugu Thalliki, which became the state song for Andhra Pradesh later. At first, he penned this song for a Telugu Film Deena bandhu but for reasons not known, the director of the film didn't keep it in the film. So Sankaram got disheartened, but His Master's Voice bought the song for 116 Rupees. The music for the lyrics were composed by Tanguturi Suryakumari and S. Balasaraswathi. The album was released and it was overwhelmingly positively received by the public turning it as a great seller for the company.

He penned a different version of Ramayana by the name Sundara Ramayanam. Later on, he also wrote Sundara Bharatam, besides half-a-dozen other works. Unfortunately, none of his works are available for reprint, even with senior scholars, libraries or his relatives. With this, posterity is denied the opportunity of studying his great works. He wrote 'Buddhageeta' which was popular seller over 10000 copies.

He would often engage the renowned scholar of his time, Kapistalam Srirangachary, in friendly literary duels and discuss politics with Madabhushi Ananthasayanam Ayyangar, the former Speaker of the Lok Sabha. Both scholars lived on the same street. His poetry was admired by readers around the world, and in one particularly memorable instance, he was honoured by the then President of India, Rajendra Prasad, and Prime Minister Jawaharlal Nehru, who presented him with a cheque for ₹116.

== Personal life ==
When he went on a work to Kanchipuram, he came to know about the health conditions of the girl Vedammal from her parents whom he eventually married and started living at Tirupati. They were happy for some time, but later when she became ill (psychological imbalance) and soon after died. They had a daughter, but she also died at the age of 5. Having lost love of his life, Sankaram became unstable and led a wanderer life. He toured many places, written some books during this period and one such Buddha Geeta became popular and sold over 10000 copies. However, with his wayward and unstable life towards the end, he missed many opportunities and recognition in life. Thus remained an unsung hero who has not received due recognition and also monetary benefits. Forced to lead a poverty stricken life and ill health, Sankaram died in the year 1977.

== Awards and felicitations ==
- Prasanna Kavi award, Sri Venkateswara University, Tirupati
- In the year 1975, on the occasion of 'World Telugu convention', he was honoured by the State government of Andhra Pradesh
- Tirupati Authority has installed a bronze statue in memory of him

== Trivia ==
Faintly recalling Sankarambadi's death in the summer of 1977, another relative working in a bank has suggested to the Government to institute a chair in a university or a literary award in his memory.
