= Rebarthi =

Village in Telangana, India

- Village
- Location within Telangana Location within India
- Coordinates: 17°56′10″N 79°04′48″E
- Country: India
- State: Telangana
- District: Siddipet
- Mandal: Maddur

Government
  - Type: Gram Panchayat

Area
  - Total: 934 km^{2} (361 sq mi)
- Elevation: 449 m (1,473 ft)

Population (2011)
  - Total: 2,875
  - Density: 3.08/km^{2} (7.97/sq mi)

Languages
  - Local: Telugu, Urdu
- Time zone: UTC+5:30 (IST)
- PIN: 506367
- STD code: 08710
- Vehicle registration: TS-36

Rebarthi, or Rebarthy, is a village in Maddur mandal, Siddipet district, Telangana, India. It is located to the southeast of the district headquarter Siddipet, at an average elevation of 449 metres above the sea level. The population of the village was 2,875 in 2011.
