= Ayinampudi Srilakshmi =

Telugu poet and writer

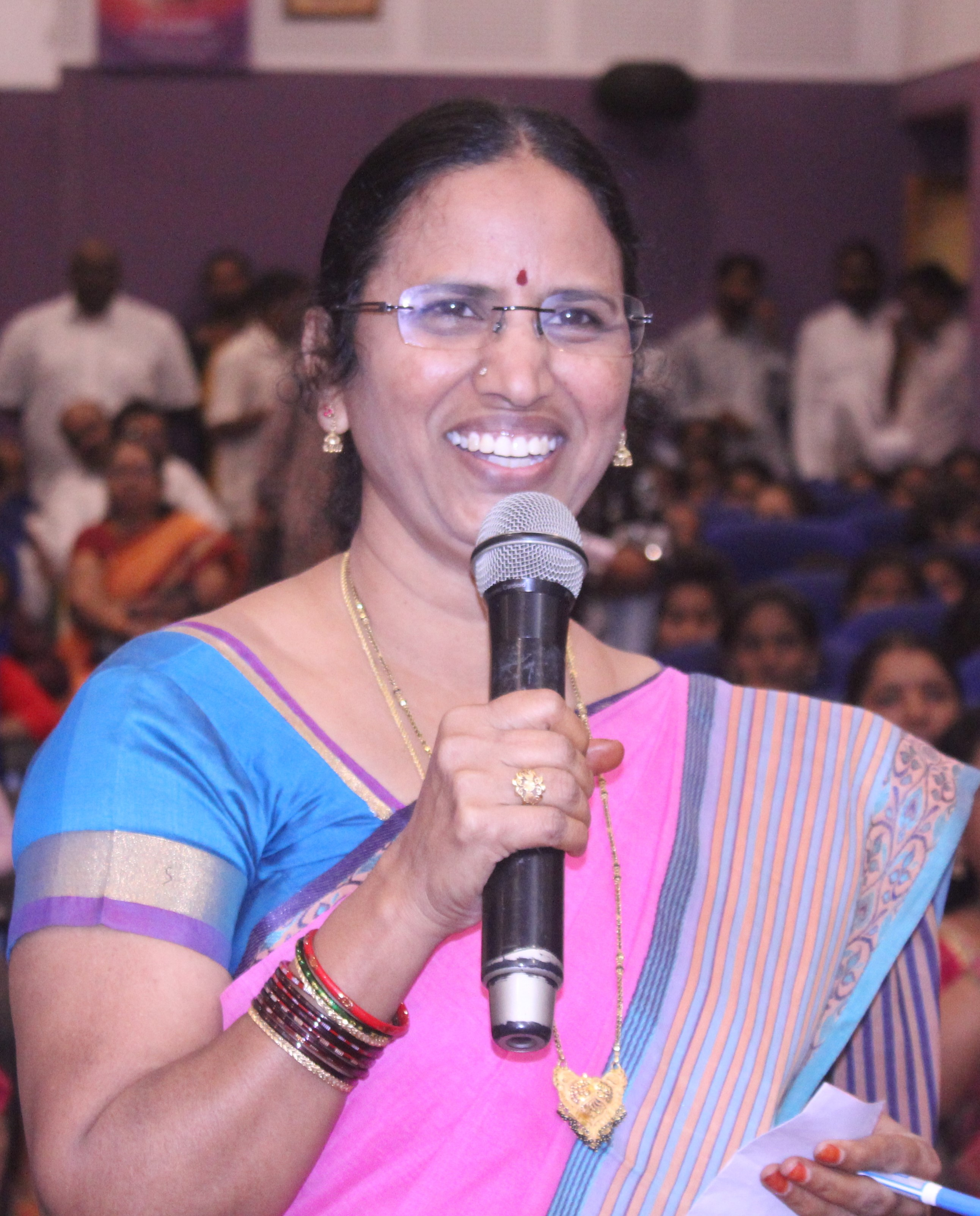

Personal details
- Born: 15 August 1967 Bodhan, Nizamabad district
- Education: B.Ed.

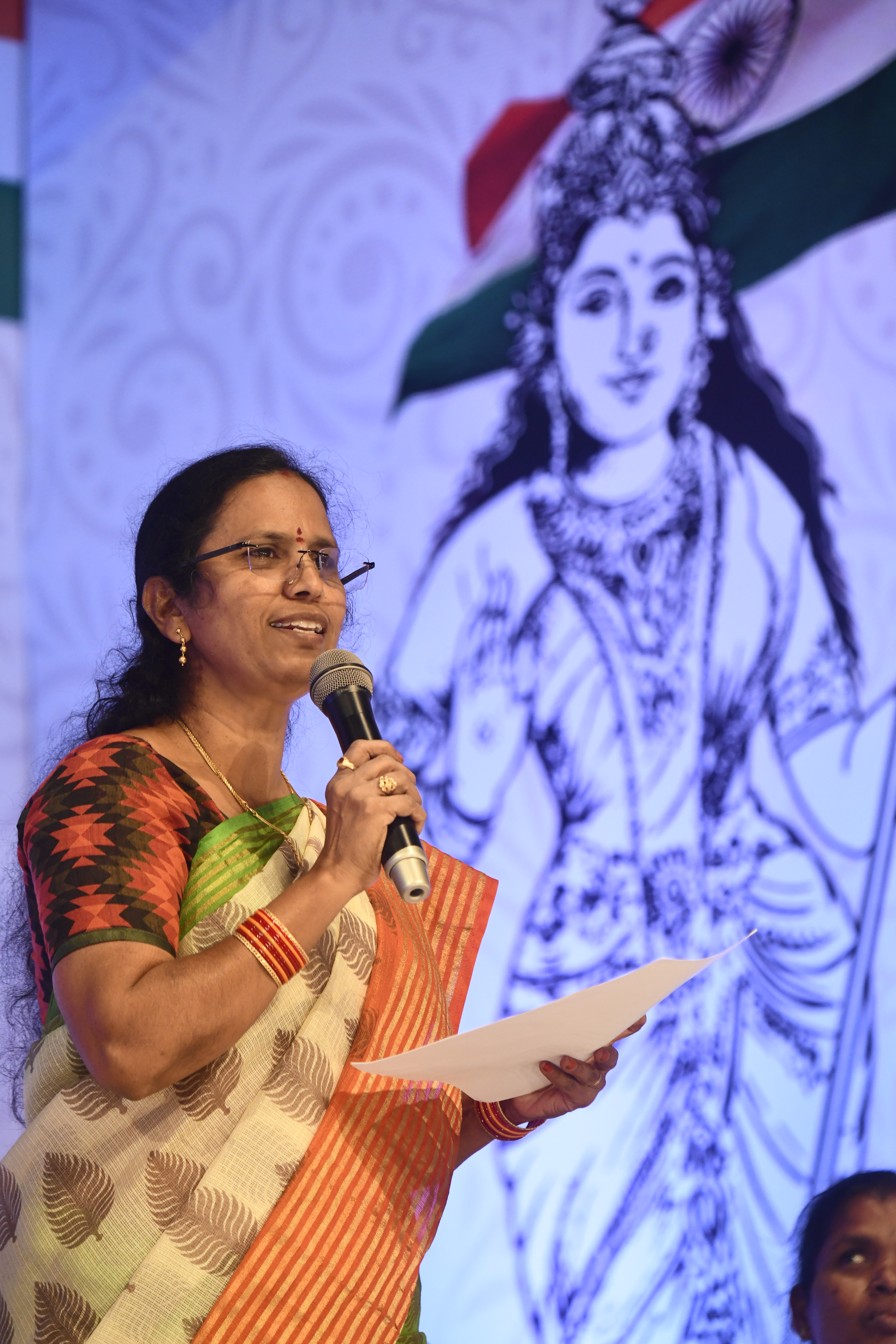
Reciting poetry during the Aazadi ka Kavi Sammelan at Ravindra Bharathi, Hyderabad, on 3 April 2021

Ayinampudi Srilakshmi is a Telugu poet and writer. She has been serving as an announcer at All India Radio Hyderabad for over two and a half decades. Srilakshmi has authored numerous articles, books, and poems. She has also created several documentaries. She has hosted various programs on cinema and conducted interviews with renowned personalities on All India Radio. In 2020, she received the Telangana State Excellence Award for Women-2020 from the Government of Telangana for her contribution to literature.

== Biography ==
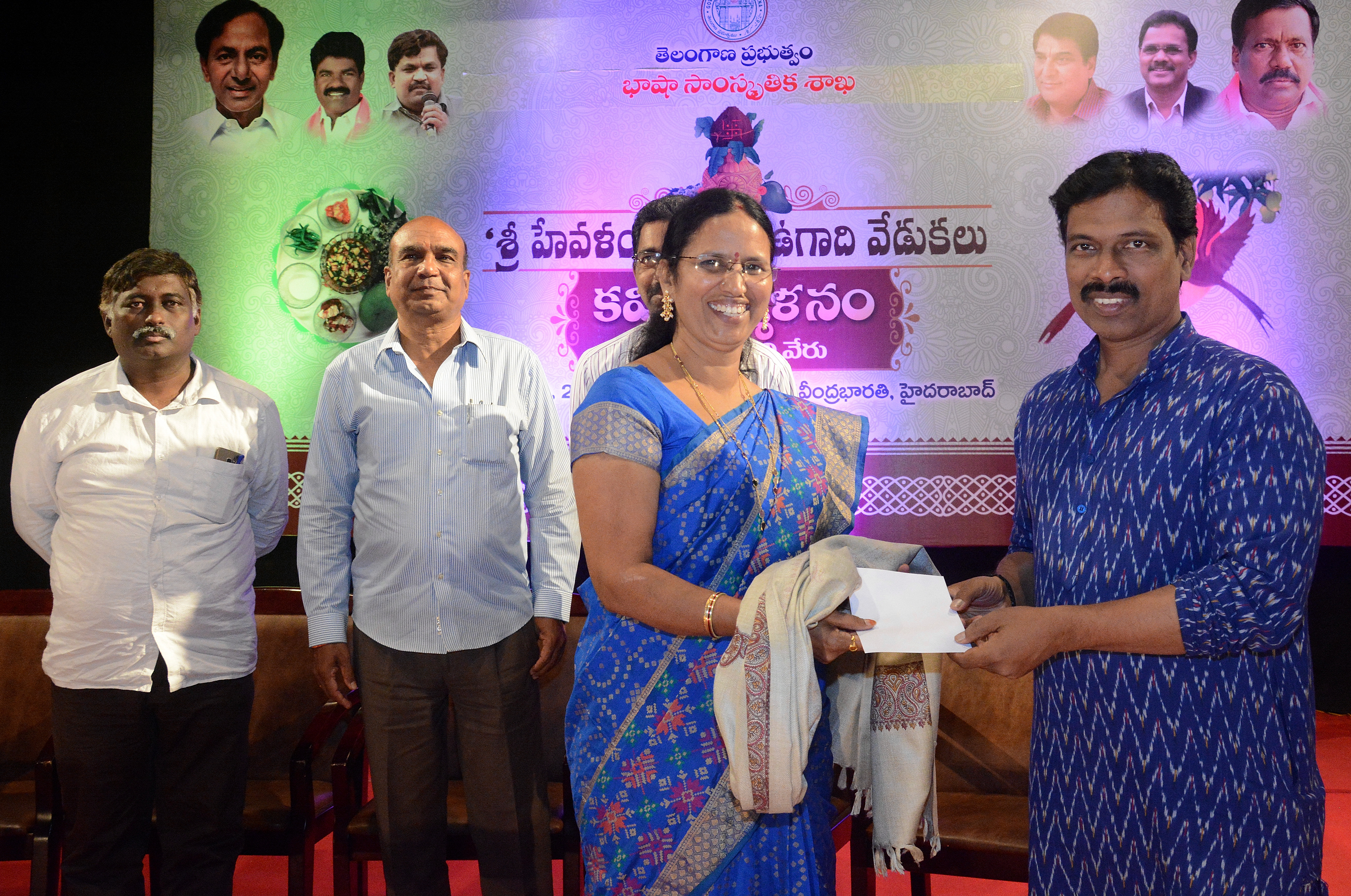
Receiving honors at the Ugadi Kavi Sammelanam in 2017

She was born on 15 August 1967 in Bodhan, Nizamabad district. Her ancestors migrated from Andhra Pradesh in the 1940s. She graduated in science from Giriraj College, pursued a master’s degree in Political Science from Dr. B.R. Ambedkar Open University, and completed a B.Ed. from Osmania University. She currently works as a government employee at All India Radio Hyderabad as an announcer. Srilakshmi has a profound interest in poetry and filmmaking. She has published several articles, books, and poems on diverse topics, including fine arts and cinema.

== Literary Contributions ==
She began her literary journey during her school days, writing poetry and editing the school magazine. In 2000, she served as an editorial member of the special issue of Indur magazine. She has written reviews of works by various poets and authors in Yojana and Prajashakti. She published Alalavaana in 2001 and Drukkonam (Visual Images) in 2003. In 2011, she published a long poem titled Life@Charminar, introducing a new literary form called a docu-poem. This work won the Special Jury Award at the 5th Kafiso National Film Festival. Her poem Vennela Dukhham won the Ranjani Kundurti Award on 18 January 2012.

== Works ==
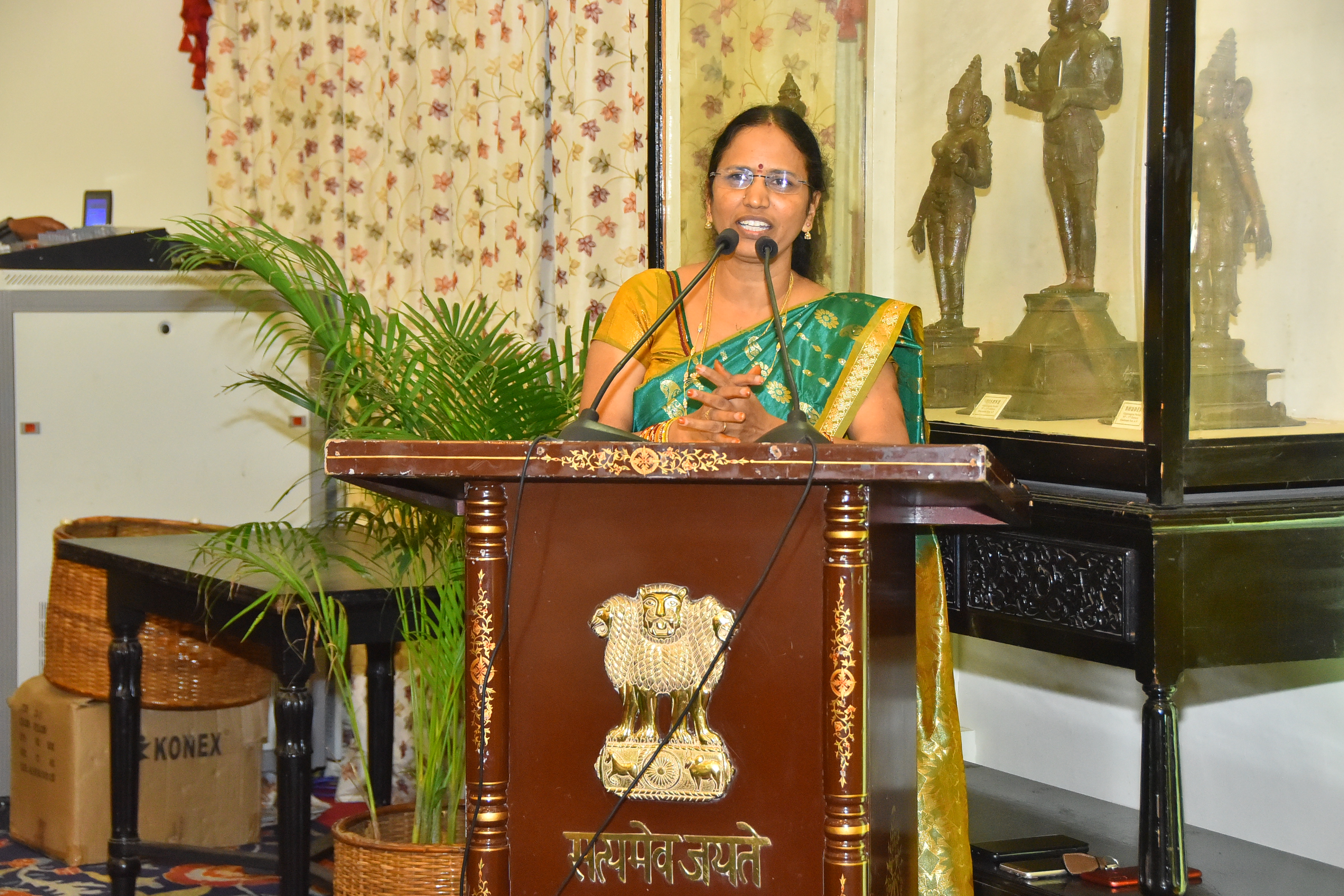
Participating in Bathukamma celebrations at Raj Bhavan, Hyderabad, on 4 October 2019

=== Poetry Collections ===
1. Alalavaana
2. Drukkonam
3. Darwaza Meeda Chandamama
4. Kavithvame O Galaxy

=== Long Poems ===
1. Life@Charminar
2. Wounded Heart (translated into English as Monologue of a Wounded Heart and into Kannada as Gayagunda Hrudaya Swagatha)

=== Epistolary Literature ===
1. Kotha Premalekhalu (New Love Letters)

=== Documentaries ===
She has produced documentaries on social issues and cultural heritage. Her creative contributions extend to fine arts and cinema, exploring untold stories and unheard voices.

== Awards and recognition ==
- Special Jury Award at the 5th Kafiso National Film Festival for Life@Charminar
- Ranjani Kundurti Award in 2012 for the poem Vennela Dukhham
- Telangana State Excellence Award for Women in 2020

== See also ==
- All India Radio
