= Kaloji Narayana Rao =

Indian freedom fighter (1914–2002)

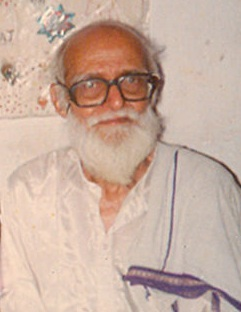
- Born: 9 September 1914; Ratthalli, Bijapur (now Karnataka), British Raj
- Died: 13 November 2002 (aged 88); Warangal, Andhra Pradesh (now Telangana), India
- Other names: Kalanna, Praja Kavi
- Known for: Political Activist, Poet

Kaloji Narayana Rao (9 September 1914 – 13 November 2002) was an Indian poet, freedom fighter, anti-fascist and political activist of Telangana. He was awarded the Padma Vibhushan in 1992. The Telangana government honored Kaloji's birthday as Telangana Language Day.

== Education and activism ==
Kaloji was born on 9 September 1914 in Rattihalli village in the Bijapur district, of Karnataka. His mother Ramabayamma hailing from Karnataka. His father, Kaloji Rangarao is from Maharashtra, and his elder brother, Kaloji Rameshwar Rao, an Urdu poet, played a vital role in shaping his personality. Kaloji completed his primary education from Madikonda and higher education in Warangal and Hyderabad. Kaloji is a polyglot. Although he studied Telugu from an early age, he also wrote poetry in Marathi, Kannada, Hindi and Urdu. Kaloji married Rukmini Bai in 1940.

During his student days, he was deeply influenced by and participated in the popular movements of the time. like the Arya Samaj Movement, especially in the domain of civil rights. He was also involved in Andhra Maha Sabha activities since its formation in 1934, and part of the Satyagraha, Osmania University Vandemataram, State Congress, Andhra Mahasabha (Telangana) and Library movements. Considered by many to be a freedom fighter, he was part of the freedom movement of Hyderabad State and underwent imprisonment under the Nizam.

His commitment to human rights made him an active member of the Tarkunde Committee. Although opposed to power and the trappings of office Kaloji looked upon elections as a democratic exercise. He contested thrice and got elected once as a member of the Andhra Pradesh Legislative Council. His most significant dispute was against Jalagam Vengal Rao, the Chief Minister of Andhra Pradesh, in 1977.

== Honour ==
In September 2014, the Government of Telangana in his honour, named the Medical University, Kaloji Narayana Rao University of Health Sciences after him.

In September 2025, the Government of Telangana have decided to celebrate the birth Anniversary of Kaloji, on 9 September every year as a State Function.

== Literary works ==
Kaloji wrote poetry in Telugu, Urdu, Hindi and Marathi languages. In 1992, he was awarded an honorary doctorate by Kakatiya University.

=== Published writings ===
- Anakathalu (1941)
- Naa Bharatadesha Yatra (1941, translation of Brail Ford's Rebel India)
- Kaloji Kathalu (1943)
- Parthiva vijayam (1946)
- Naa Godava (1953, 1st edition)
- Tudi Vijayam Manadi Nijam (1962)
- Naa Godava Parashiva Hemantham (1966)
- Naa Godava Parabhava Shishiram (1967)
- Naa Godava Parabhava (1967, 1st edition, third print)
- Jeevana Geetha (1968, translation of Khalil Zibran's The Prophet)
- Telangana Udyama Kavithalu (1969-70)
- Naa Godava (Yuva Bharathi) (1974)
- Naa Godava (1975-77)
- Idi Naa Godava (1995, autobiographical)
- Bapu! Bapu!! Bapu!!! (1995)
- Kaloji Kathalu (2000)

== Documentary film ==
In 2014 filmmaker Amarnath Sandipamu made a documentary film called Mana Kaloji. Sculpting the narrative with existing footage, he says, "Treating like a character study, exploring Kaloji through his personal life and ideas of resistance, this film has been shaped with the archival interviews of his wife - Rukmini Bai, grandson – Santosh and Kaloji himself. Kaloji’s life, narrated as memories by his wife and grandson, has been juxtaposed with his own interview where he counters with his own ideas of life and resistance. This juxtaposition forms a conversation-like intimate encounter with him capturing perspectives for a better world and the human essence demystifying the legendary personality."

== Death ==
Kaloji died on 13 November 2002. He donated his body for research to Kakatiya Medical College in Warangal.
