= Telangana Thalli =

Statue representing the people of Telangana

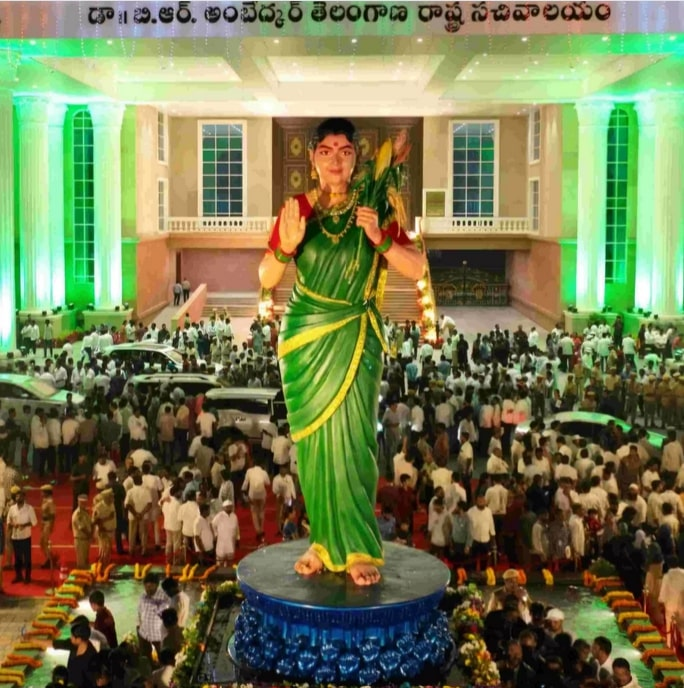
Telangana Thalli Statue at Secretariat, Hyderabad

The Telangana Thalli (lit. 'Mother Telangana') statue, was unveiled on December 9, 2024, by Chief Minister Anumula Revanth Reddy in the Dr. B.R. Ambedkar Telangana State Secretariat, representing the cultural identity, self-respect, and aspirations of the people of Telangana. Designed as a tribute to the state's heritage and struggles for statehood, it reflects the everyday woman of Telangana.

== History ==
The concept of Telangana Thalli emerged during the Telangana statehood movement as a counterpart to "Telugu Thalli" in united Andhra Pradesh. It was intended to become a rallying symbol for statehood aspirations. Since then, the Telangana Thalli statue has gone through various changes over a period of time by various political factions of Telangana statehood movement.

Before 2014, under BRS (then TRS) party's leadership a statue was unveiled by changing the Telugu Thalli statue, by replacing Purnakalasham with Bathukamma pot. However, it was not officially notified nor universally accepted due to resemblance with Telugu Thalli and feudal characteristics of the statue. Different political parties had given different imagery to the Mother Telangana concept.

After the Congress government assumed leadership of the Telangana Government on December 7 2023, the new Chief Minister Anumula Revanth Reddy envisaged the idea of having an official Telangana Thalli statue, that represents the wishes of revolutionaries and martyrs of separate Telangana statehood movement. He began public and political consultations towards the process of unveiling the statue on December 9, a significant date in the history of the state, as it was announced by then Home Minister P. Chidambaram, on this date that a separate Telangana state would be created by the Government of India.

== The statue ==
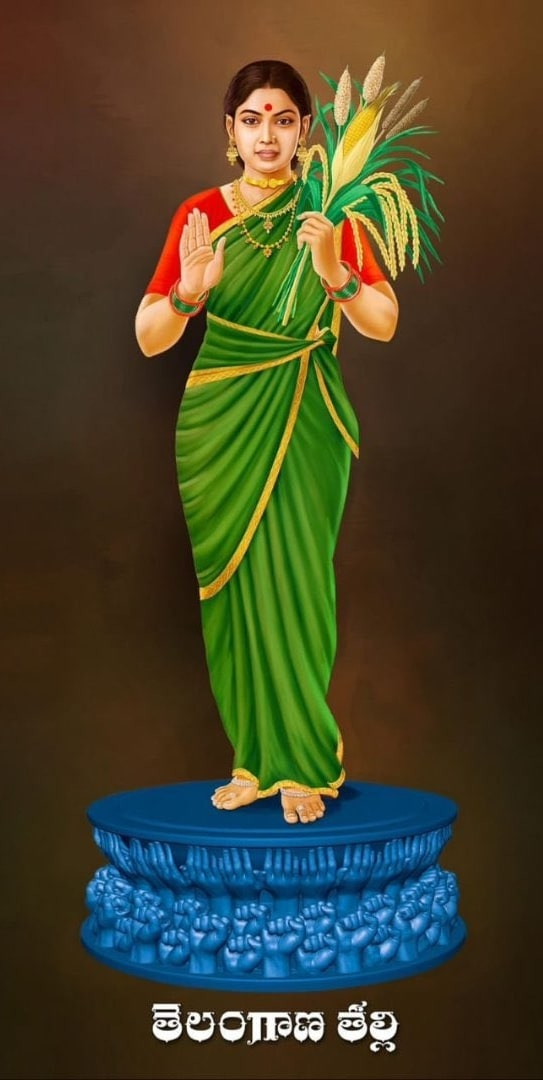
The statue

The statue of Telangana Thalli portrays a woman dressed in a green saree, symbolizing prosperity and the agricultural abundance of Telangana. She is shown holding a sheaf of harvested crops on one hand, representing the state's agrarian roots and fertile lands, while her posture exudes confidence and hope. She shows Abhaya Mudra with another hand, blessing the state's people with prosperity. Her saree is tied near the waist reflecting a woman adjusting her saree to get ready to work or fight. Adorned with traditional jewelry, the Telangana Thalli statue reflects the rich cultural heritage of Telangana, and emphasizes the nurturing identity of a mother figure.

Designed to reflect the appearance of a woman, a mother from Telangana, the statue stands 20 feet tall and embodies the state's cultural essence. The government emphasized that the statue's design aims to preserve and celebrate Telangana's cultural heritage.

Further, the statue represents:

- The fighting spirit of historical figures like Chakali Ailamma and Sammakka-Saralamma
- Telangana's agricultural heritage through traditional crops
- The common woman's dignity and resilience
- The state's journey from struggle to statehood through fists and hands upholding the statue from below

The statue was sculpted by Architect Ramana Reddy and conceptualised by CM Revanth Reddy and Professor Gangadhar, JNAFAU.

== Legal status ==
The Telangana government issued orders (GO Ms. No. 1946) recognizing the Telangana Thalli statue as official symbol of Telangana, establishing the following:

- Official recognition as a Telangana Thalli
- December 9, the date of unveiling is designated as "Telangana Thalli Avirbhava Dinotsavam" (Formation Day)
- Criminalization of any disrespect or distortion of the statue
- Protection against misrepresentation or insulting the statue in any form
