= Vajjala Shiva Kumar =

Vajjala Shiva Kumar is the a well known free verse Telugu poet. Vajjala Shiva Kumar was born in 1956 in Vemulawada, Karimnagar district, Telangana. He is the only son of Vajjala Samba Shiva Sharma and Radha Bai and was born and brought up in Vemulawada a temple town. Retired librarian from Kendriya Vidyalaya Sangathan.

His contribution to Telugu poetry has been recognized and appreciated by various literary bodies of Telugu language. His poetry has an immense touch of revolution with emphasis on "Human Values Plus Sentiments". His works include - Gogupuvvu, Palakankula Kala, Daakhala and Kalala Saagu(Cultivation of Dreams). His first work 'Gogupuvvu' was recognized with Free Verse Front award and had won the hearts of many Telugu language fans. His second work got 'CNARE' Puraskaram (the award in the name of poet Sri. Dr. C. Narayana Reddy).

His contribution to Telugu poetry has been recognized and appreciated by various literary bodies of Telugu language. He was conferred with Kundurti Free Verse Front Award for his Gogupuvvu in 1994 and the famous Cinare (Dr C Narayana Reddy) award for his work Palakankula Kala. His latest collection of poems Dakhala was selected and awarded by Andhra Saraswata Samiti. He was also felicitated with Mallojjala SadaShivudu award for the year 2017 recently, for his literary contributions.

His poetry comes with a stamp of nativity and depicts the pain the poet has for the diminishing human values. He speaks on vivid topics ranging from the hazards of the globalisation to the problems of the local people working in mines in the coal belt area of Godavarikhani.

During his career in Kendriya Vidyalaya Sangathan Schools he started Readers Club Movement to promote reading habits and to promote creative talents of the students. Until his last day of service he continued the publication of the online Magazine 'Librarys' (which he started). For his devoted contributions he was awarded the KVS Regional Incentive Award for the year 2015.

His poetry mostly carries the innocent scent of the dialect of Telangana. He shares his lifetime experiences in his poetry. Since 4 decades he is taking active role to establish many literary units to promote creative literary talents and to fight against the social injustice and evils.
