= Chukka Ramaiah =

Indian educationist and politician

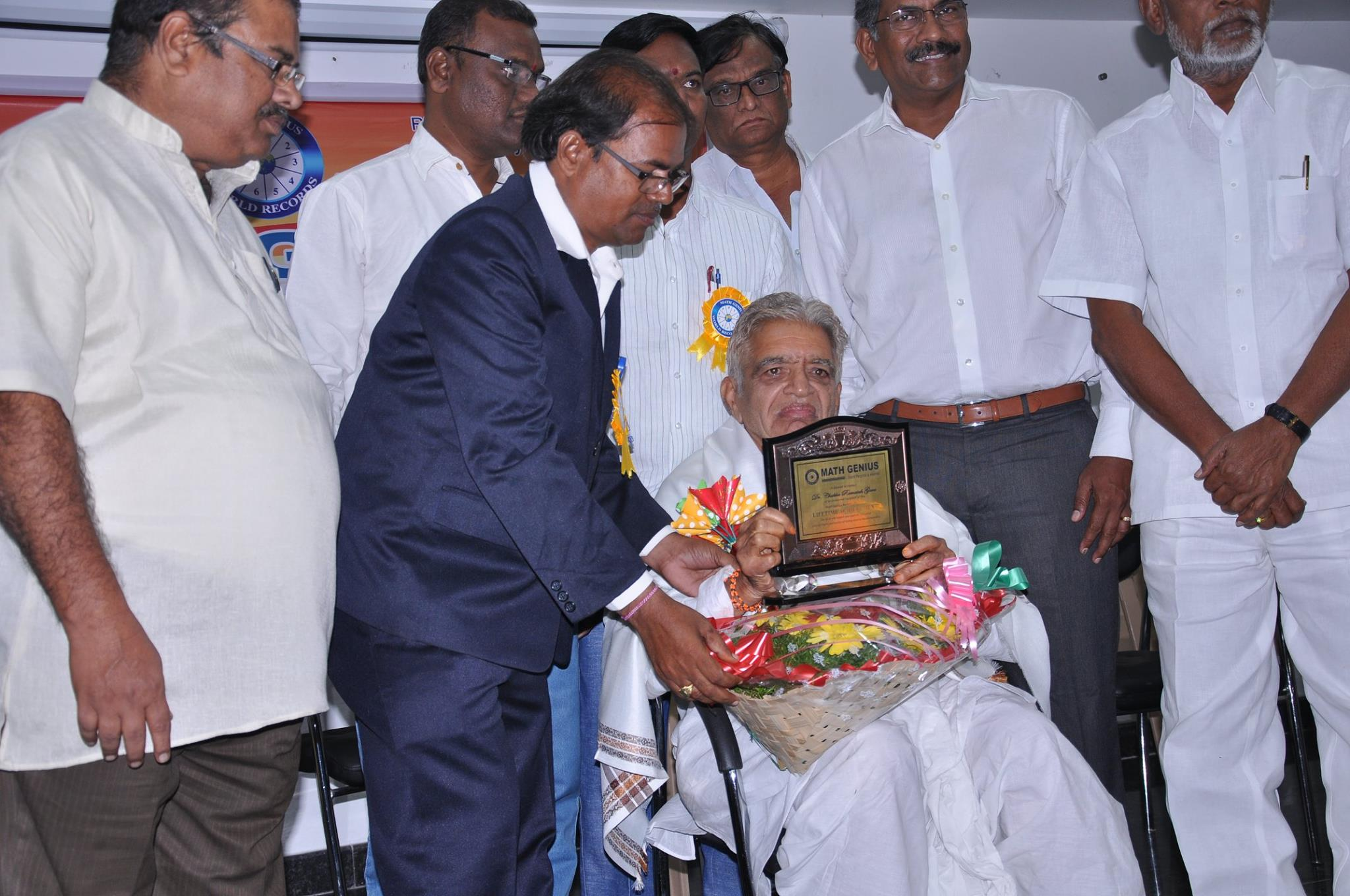
- Ramaiah receiving an award in 2016
- Born: 20 November 1925 (age 101); Gudur village, Warangal district, Telangana, India
- Occupations: Educator, activist, legislator

Chukka Ramaiah (born 20 November 1925) is an Indian educationist. He is known as "IIT Ramaiah" for teaching at IIT Study Circle, an IIT JEE coaching centre at Nallakunta, Hyderabad, India. He was a leading Telangana activist.

== Career ==
Ramaiah fought against the feudal system in Hyderabad State that was prevalent in the rural hinterland of the Telangana region. He joined Mahatma Gandhi's untouchability movement and tried to reform the backward sections in his village. He actively participated in the rebellion against the Razakar movement and was jailed for several years.

=== Political career ===
Ramaiah was elected to the Telangana Legislative Council from the Teacher's Constituency of Warangal, Khammam and Nalgonda in 2007 and held the position for 6 years. He was the floor leader of eight independent MLCs who got elected from different Constituencies.

=== Activism ===
He was instrumental in the fight to set up an IIT in Telangana in Hyderabad, Telangana.

He was a strong votary for the statehood of Telangana and often spoke of poverty and backwardness of the region.

=== Writing career ===
Ramaiah authored over 16 books in Telugu, mainly focusing on education, including Chinna Paatam and Desadesallo Vidya.
