= Ma Telugu Talliki =

Official state song of Andhra Pradesh, India

Mā Telugu Talliki
English: To Our Mother Telugu
- మా తెలుగుతల్లికి
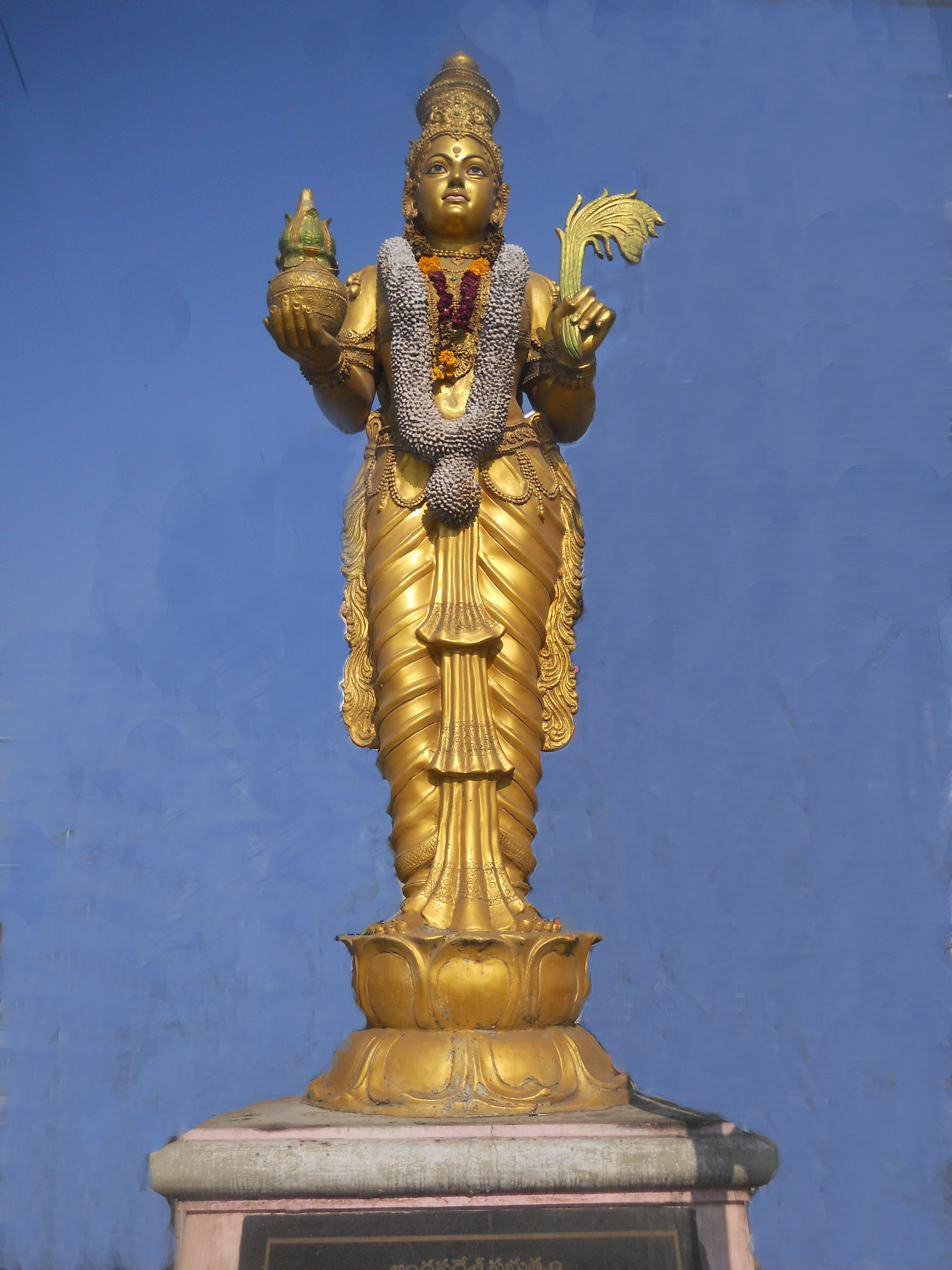
- A statue of Telugu Talli, who is the namesake of the song
- State song of Andhra Pradesh
- Lyrics: Shankarambāḍi Sundarācāri, 1942
- Music: Ṭanguṭūri Sūryakumāri
- Adopted: 1975

"Mā Telugu Talliki" (Note: Telugu pronunciation: [maː ˈt̪eluɡu‿t̪alːiki]; lit. 'To Our Mother Telugu') is the official state song of the Indian state of Andhra Pradesh. The main subject of the song, Mother Telugu, is portrayed as a sacred symbol of the Telugu people.

== Background ==
The words of the song were written by Shankarambāḍi Sundarācāri, and it was composed and sung by Ṭanguṭūri Sūryakumāri for the 1942 Telugu film Deena Bandhu, which starred V. Nagayya but was released as a private label by the artist.

For the various versions on the etymology of Telugu, see Telugu language. The image of the mother is used as a metaphor for all the prosperity and culture of the region. She is the embodiment of various aspects of cultural legacy like the architecture of Amaravati; the classical music immortalised by Tyagaraja; the lyrical beauties of Tikkana, who rendered the Mahabharata into Telugu; the physical bravery of Rani Rudrama Devi of the 13th century Kakatiya dynasty; the 'devotion to husband' of Mallamma; the sharp intelligence of Timmarusu, who was the Prime Minister of Krishna Deva Raya; or the fame of Krishna Deva Raya. It may be seen that while invoking the cultural legacy of the Telugus, the song covers all the three important regions: Rayalaseema, Coastal Andhra and Telangana.

== Lyrics ==
Telugu original

Telugu script

మా తెలుగు తల్లికి మల్లెపూదండ,
మా కన్న తల్లికి మంగళారతులు,
కడుపులో బంగారు కనుచూపులో కరుణ,
చిరునవ్వులో సిరులు దొరలించు మాతల్లి.

గలగలా గోదారి కదలిపోతుంటేను,
బిరాబిరా క్రిష్ణమ్మ పరుగులిడుతుంటేను,
బంగారు పంటలే పండుతాయీ,
మురిపాల ముత్యాలు దొరులుతాయి.

అమరావతి గుహల అపురూప శిల్పాలు,
త్యాగయ్య గొంతులో తారాడు నాదాలు,
తిక్కయ్య కలములొ తియ్యందనాలు,
నిత్యమై నిఖిలమై నిలచి వుండేదాకా.

రుద్రమ్మ భుజశక్తి మల్లమ్మ పతిభక్తి,
తిమ్మరసు ధీయుక్తి, కృష్ణరాయల కీర్తి,
మా చెవులు రింగుమని మారుమ్రోగేదాక,
నీపాటలే పాడుతాం, నీ ఆటలే ఆడుతాం,
జై తెలుగు తల్లి, జై తెలుగు తల్లి!

ISO

Mā Telugu talliki mallepūdaṇḍa,
Mā kanna talliki maṅgaḷāratulu,
Kaḍupulō baṅgāru kanucūpulō karuṇa,
Cirunavvulō sirulu doraliñcu mātalli.

Galagalā gōdāri kadalipōtuṇṭēnu,
Birābirā kriṣṇamma paruguliḍutuṇṭēnu,
Baṅgāru paṇṭalē paṇḍutāyī,
Muripāla mutyālu dorulutāyi.

Amarāvati guhala apurūpa śilpālu,
Tyāgayya gontulō tārāḍu nādālu,
Tikkayya kalamulo tiyyandanālu,
Nityamai nikhilamai nilaci vuṇḍēdākā.

Rudramma bhujaśakti mallamma patibhakti,
Timmarasu dhīyukti, kr̥ṣṇarāyala kīrti,
Mā cevulu riṅgumani mārumrōgēdāka,
Nīpāṭalē pāḍutām, nī āṭalē āḍutām,
Jai Telugu talli, jai Telugu talli!

IPA transcription

[maː t̪e.lu.ɡu t̪al.li.ki mal.le.puː.d̪aɳ.ɖa |]
[maː kan.na.t̪al.li.ki maŋ.ga.ɭaː.ɾa.t̪u.lu ‖]
[ka.ɖu.pu.lo baŋ.gaː.ɾu ka.nu.t͡ʃuː.pu.loː ka.ɾu.ɳa |]
[t͡ʃi.ɾu.naʋ.ʋu.loː si.ɾu.lu d̪o.ɾa.lin.t͡ʃu maː t̪al.li ‖]

[ga.la.ga.laː goː.d̪aː.ɾi ka.d̪i.li.poː.t̪uɳ.ʈeː.nu |]
[bi.ɾa.bi.ɾaː kɽiʂ.ɳam.ma pa.ɾu.gu.le.ɖu.t̪uɳ.ʈeː.nu ‖]
[baɳ.gaː.ɾu paɳ.ʈa.leː paɳ.ɖu.t̪aː.iː |]
[mu.ɾi.paː.la mut̪.jaː.lu d̪o.ɾa.lu.t̪aː.iː ‖]

[a.ma.ɾaː.ʋa.t̪i na.ga.ɾa a.pu.ɾuː.pa ɕil.paː.lu |]
[t̪jaː.gaj.ja gon̪.t̪u.loː t̪aː.ɾaː.ɖu naː.d̪aː.lu ‖]
[t̪ik̚.kaj.ja ka.la.mu.loː t̪ij.jan̪.d̪a.naː.lu |]
[ni.t̪ja.maɪ̯ ni.kʰi.la.maɪ̯ ni.la.t͡ʃi ʋuɳ.ɖeː.d̪aː.ka ‖]

[ɾu.d̪r̪am.ma bʱu.d͡ʒa.ɕak̚.t̪i mal.lam.ma pa.t̪i bʱak̚.t̪i |]
[t̪im.ma.ɾa.s̪u d̪ʱiː.juk̚.t̪i kɽiʂ.ɳa.ɾaː.ja.la kiːɾ.t̪i ‖]
[maː t͡ʃeː.ʋu.lu ɾiŋ.gu.ma.ni maː.ɾum.ɾoː.geː.daː.ka |]
[niː paː.ʈa.leː paː.ɖu.t̪aːm̃ niː aː.ʈa.leː aː.ɖu.t̪aːm̃ ‖]
[d͡ʒaɪ̯ t̪e.lu.ɡu t̪al.li.ki d͡ʒaɪ̯ t̪e.lu.ɡu t̪al.li.ki ‖]

English translation

To our Mother Telugu, a garland of jasmines
Devoted we are to our great Mother who birthed us
With gold in thy belly and grace in thine eyes
Our Mother whose smile wealth poureth forth.

Full of life and vigour is river Godavari
Full of elation the river Krishna floweth
Crops of gold shall they yield bountifully
Glinting and shining gems shall roll forth.

The exotic sculptures of Amaravati
The riveting choral voice of Tyāgayya
The wondrous writings of Tikkayya
Gloriously withstood the tests of time.

Rudramma's strength and Mallamma's fidelity
Timmarasu's courage and Krishnadevaraya's glory
Until our ears ring with pleasantries
We'll sing thy songs, we'll play thy games
Victory, victory to our Mother Telugu!

== Legacy ==
The song was used in the 1976 film Alludochadu featuring Ramakrishna and Jayasudha. The song was used by N. T. Rama Rao after he launched the Telugu Desam Party during his state wide tour. The song was used in 1985 film Bullet featuring Krishnam Raju and Suhasini. It was last used in the 2010 film Leader featuring Rana Daggubati and Richa Gangopadhyay.

== See also ==
- "Jaya Jaya He Telangana", another state song in Telugu
- List of Indian state songs
