= Madikonda =

- Neighbourhood
- Location in Telangana, India Madikonda (India)
- Coordinates: 17.961487°N 79.485891°E
- Country: India
- State: Telangana
- District: Warangal

Government
  - Body: Greater Warangal Municipal Corporation

Languages
  - Official: Telugu
- Time zone: UTC+5:30 (IST)
- Vehicle registration: TS
- Website: telangana.gov.in

Madikonda is a neighbourhood of Warangal in Telangana, India. It is on the way from Hyderabad to Warangal on National Highway 163 (India). During 2011 Census, Madikonda which was earlier a partly rural village have been classified as fully outgrowth to Warangal urban assemblage, and has become part of Greater Warangal Municipal Corporation.

== Culture ==
There are four historical temples in Madikonda. Lord Shiva Keshava temple, Lord Venu Gopalaswamy temple, Lord Hanumangi and Mettu Rama Lingeshwara swamy Temple.

Mettu Rama Lingeshwara swamy Temple is on Mettu Gutta, which has two temples – One for Lord Shiva and other for Lord Sri Rama, has also been considered to be developed as part of the major spiritual tourism circuit in Warangal by the state government.

== Economy ==
IT Special economic zone is established in Madikonda by Government of Telangana.

As part of Cyient's 70,000 square feet state-of-the-art Technology Development Centre in Warangal, the company has started its operations from the Incubation Centre of the TSIIC.
