= Veeramalla Prakash =

Indian advocate and writer

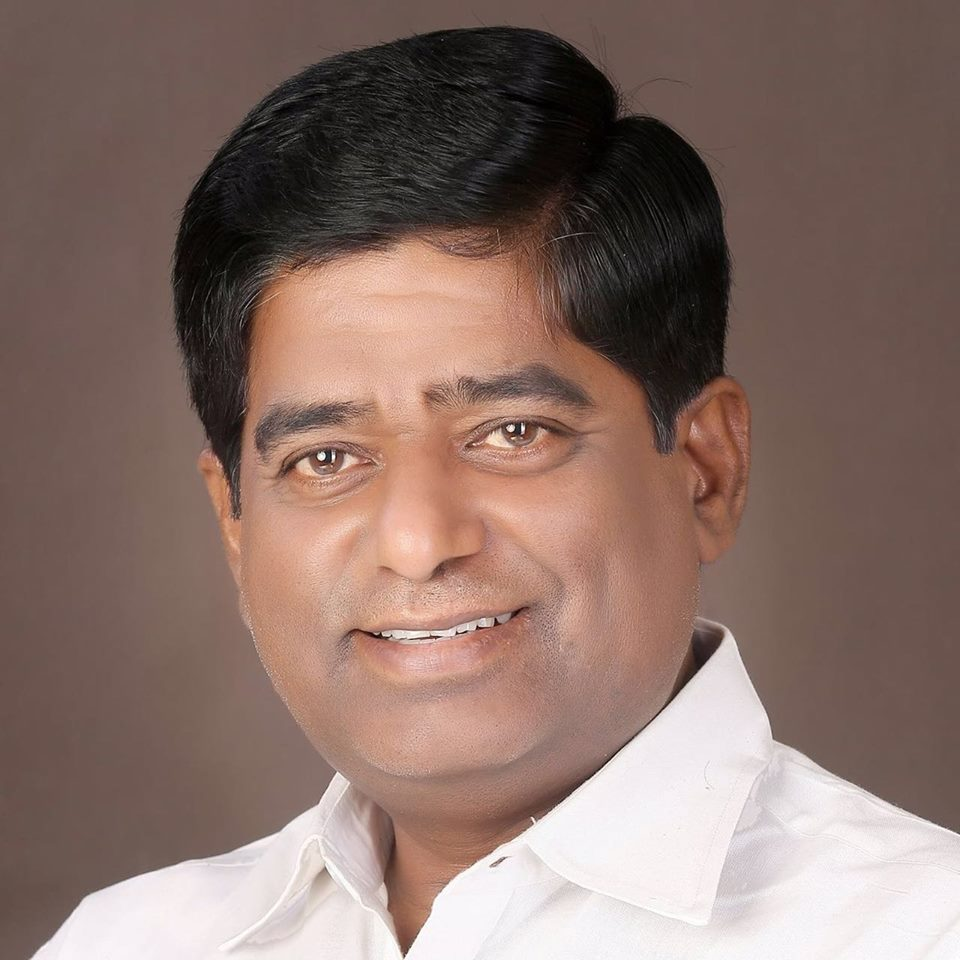
- Born: 15 January 1958 (age 68); Palampet, Mdl Venkatapur, Mulugu district, Telangana
- Occupations: Politician, Writer, Lawyer
- Office: Chairman of Telangana Water Resources Development Corporation
- Political party: Bharat Rashtra Samithi
- Parents: Raja Narsinga Rao (father); Kousalya (mother)

Veeramalla Prakash Rao (born 15 January 1958), known as Telangana Prakash, is an advocate, writer and the co-founder of Bharat Rashtra Samithi, a regional party in India.

He worked as the General Secretary and spokesperson for the BRS party. He is a policy advisor to the Chief Minister of Telangana and the Chairman of Telangana Water Resources Development Corporation. Prakash played an active role in channelizing the Telangana Statehood agitation since the formation of TRS party. He is considered an expert on the irrigation sector and policy making.

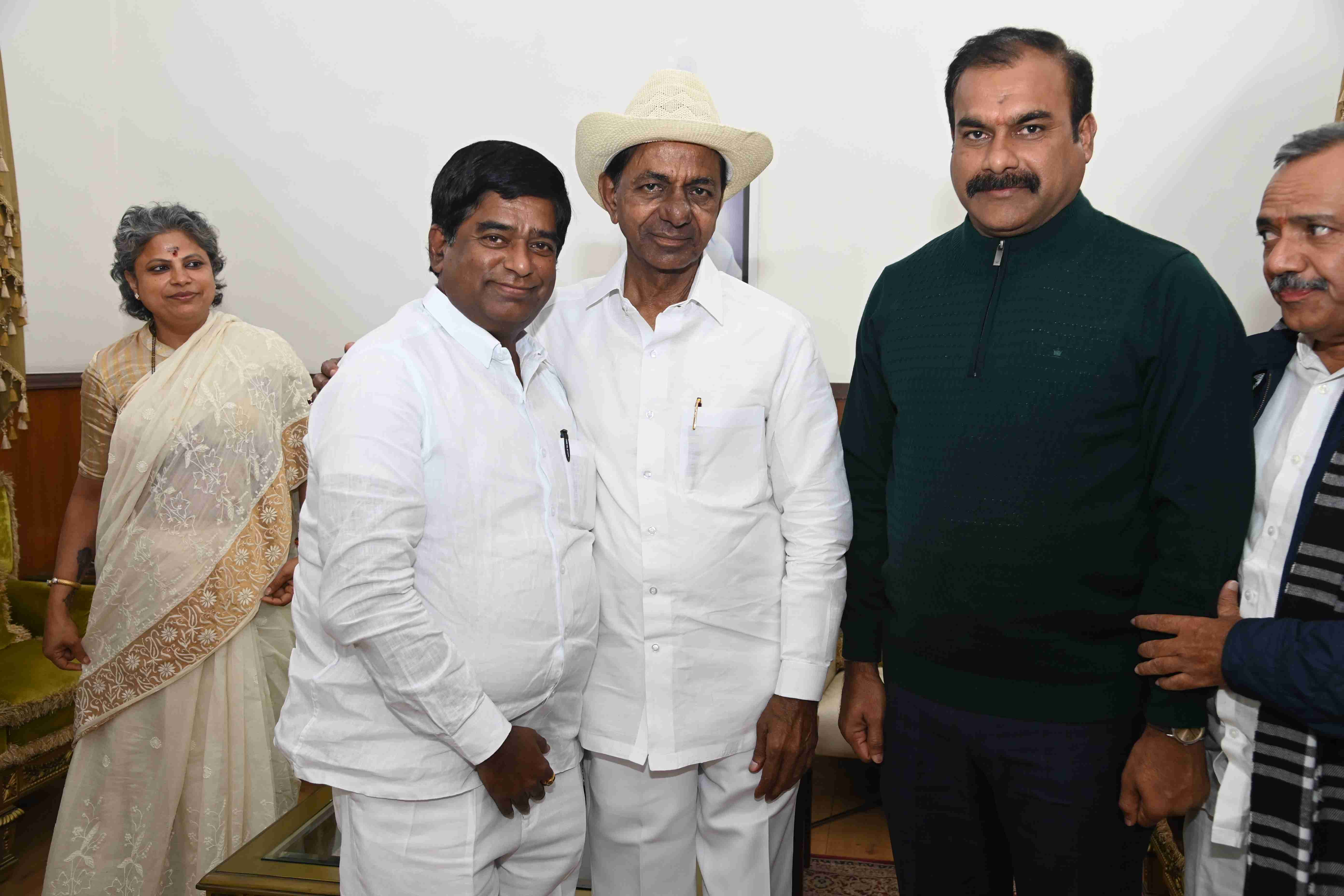
V. Prakash With CM KCR in Delhi

== Early life ==
Prakash's full name is Veeramalla Prakash Rao. He was born in Palampet of Mulugu . His father is Raja Narsinga Rao and his mother Kousalya. The Nizam Government appointed his father as Assaldar Mali Patel. His grandfather and great-grandfather served as Mali Patel of Palampet Village.

== Education ==
He completed primary, upper Primary and Secondary education in Palampet, Nallagunta, Hanamkonda and Mulug Government Schools. Later he joined the AVV Junior College for Intermediate and CKM College for Graduation (B.Sc.), both are aided colleges founded by Late Chanda Kantaiah in Warangal. Prakash qualified his MA in philosophy at the Osmania University, Hyderabad in 1981 and Law at the Kakatiya University, Warangal.

== Movements ==
Prakash participated 1969 - 1970 in the Telangana Separate State Movement when he was a student of 7th and 8th class.

He has shown interest on Radical Students and Revolutionary Movements in post emergency period. He met Comrade Kondapalli Seetharamaiah, KG Sathyamurthy founders of People's War in 1977 - 1978 and argued on their tactics, Strategies and path of revolution to liberate India. Prakash strongly criticized the Annihilation line. Later Prakash joined the Democratic Student movement as the Secretary of Democratic Students Organization which was started by Tarimela Nagi Reddy and Devulapalli Venkateswara Rao.

Prakash moved to Warangal in January 1981 on the instructions to build Peasants movement in this district. He mobilized poor and middle-class farmers and agricultural labour in Malkapur area of Station Ghanpur Assembly Constituency on their challenges and fought against the Government. He built Student movements in and around Warangal district.

DV Rao asked him to come back to Hyderabad and gave him new responsibility editing the "Vadisela" Telugu literary and cultural monthly magazine. He also transcribed his experiences of Telangana peasants Armed Struggle (1944–51).

Prakash spent almost a year and above on these two assignments. First Part of the book was edited by DV himself and published but second part (1948–51) is yet to come.

After the demise of DV Rao in July 1984 Prakash quit the Party and enrolled as an Advocate and started practising at Hyderabad. 1987 he moved to Mulug Court.

Prakash received a good reputation as a Lawyer in 5–6 months and focussed on Adult Education in rural areas including few tribal villages. After court hours he found time to visit villages up to 10 pm. He got partial financial assistance from Govt. of India to run night schools for Adult illiterate people.

In combined AP state most of the Judges and Magistrates are recruited from the Andhra region was the propaganda created by the Prakash to successfully fuel the Telangana separation. Prakash warned a corrupted Magistrate and tried to correct him. As a result, Suo-motto registered Contempt of Court Case against Prakash in 1996, and he had to leave advocate practice. He met Prof. Jayashankar, a former VC of Kakatiya University, to take active part in Telangana Separate State Movement.

== Career ==
Veeramalla Prakash started his career as an advocate in High Court of Andhra Pradesh. He is also well known as an author of the book "History of Telangana Movements and State formation" which is a reference book on Telangana history for all Telangana people, especially for the aspirants who are preparing to get a government job in newly formed Telangana state.

== Politics ==
He is the co-founder of Bharat Rashtra Samithi. He was appointed as the Chairman of Telangana Water Resources Development in March 2017.
