= Rama Chandra Mouli =

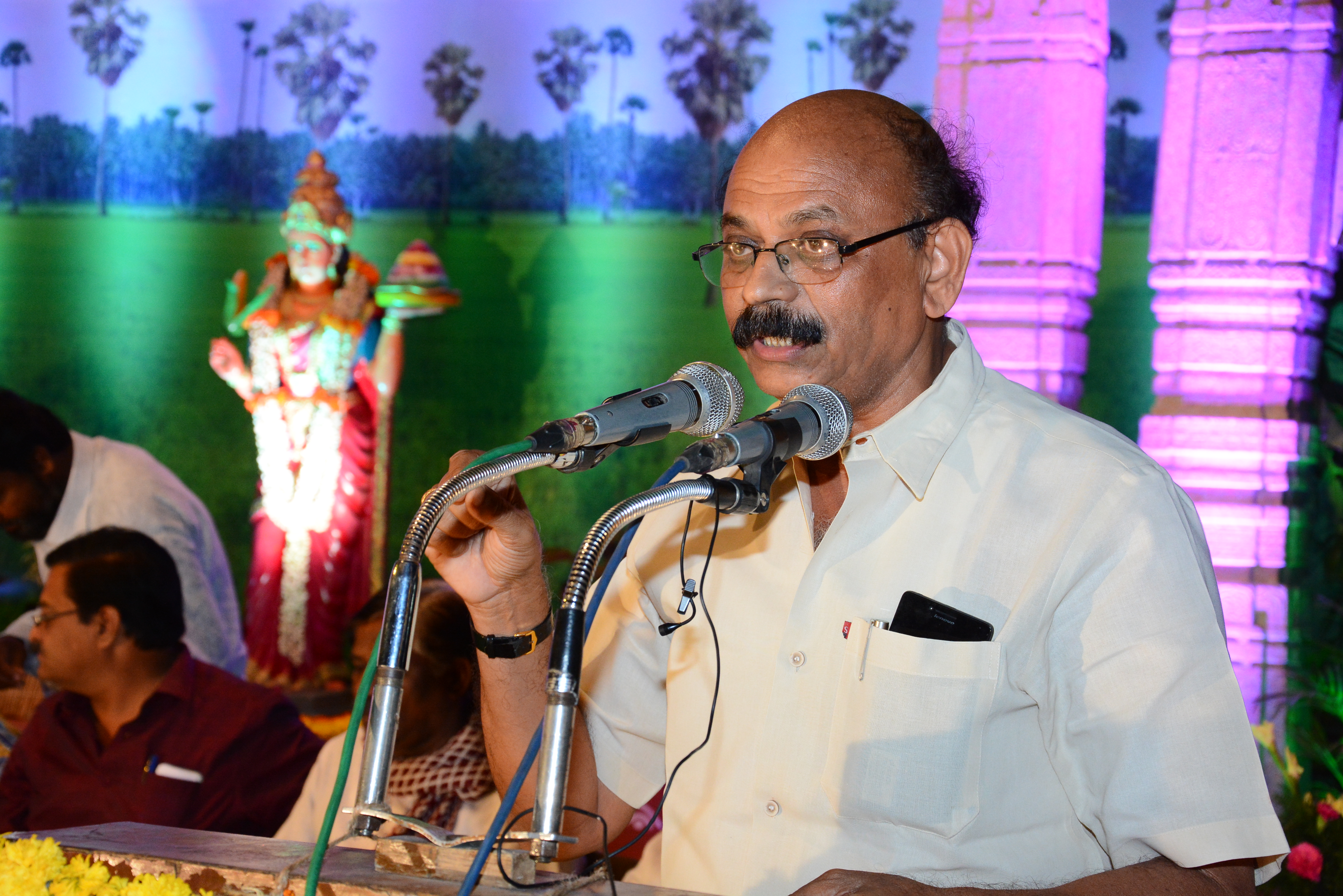
Rama Chandramouli reciting poetry at Kavi Sammelan organized by Department of Language and Culture, Government of Telangana at Rabindra Bharati on 8th April 2016

Rama Chandra Mouli (born 1950) is a writer/poet, professor and assistant principal at Ganapathy Engineering College in India. He has written a number of literary essays, anthologies of poems, novels, engineering textbooks, and other stories. He pursued his master's degree in engineering in the mechanical stream at National Institute of Technology, Warangal, formerly called Regional Engineering College. He also participated in the 22nd World Poets Congress, which was held in Greece in 2011.

== Achievements ==
Mouli was honored with the Telugu University Puraskar in 2007, for his article "Kitiki Terichina Taruvata". He also participated as an Indian delegate in the SAARC Literary Festival in 2010, 2012, and 2015; and the International Sufi Festival in 2013 and 2014. Andhra Pradesh Best Polytechnic Teacher 2000, The Sahiti Academy Award, the Rashtrapati Award, and the Kalaasagar awards are some of his other achievements.

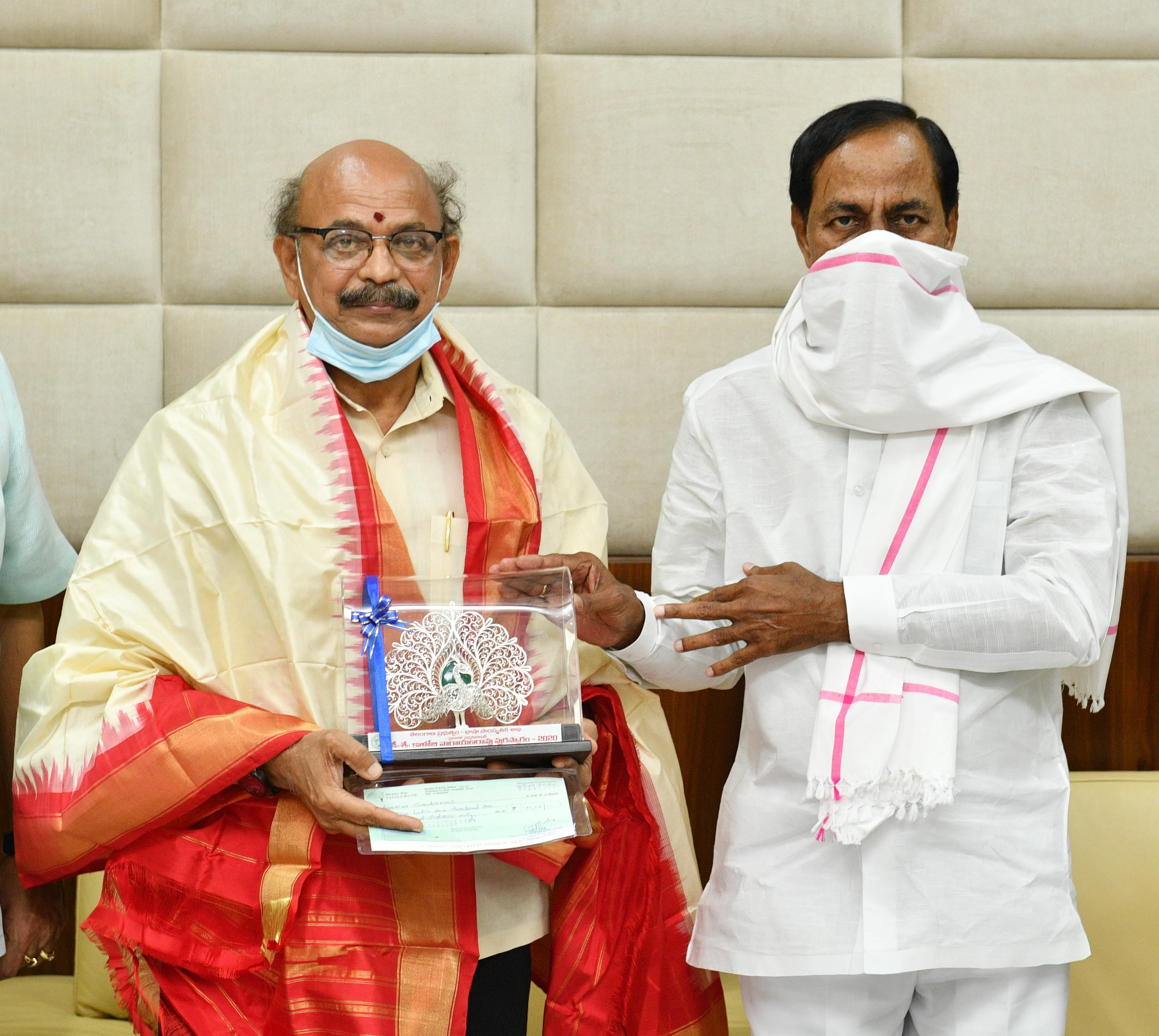
Rama Chandramouli received the award from Chief Minister Kalvakuntla Chandrasekhar Rao at the Kaloji Narayana Rao Literary Award, 2020, September 09 at Pragathi Bhavan, Hyderabad.
