= Dasaradhi Rangacharya =

Indian poet and writer (1928–2015)

- Born: 24 August 1928 (age 98); Hyderabad State, British India
- Died: 7 June 2015 (aged 86); Hyderabad, Telangana, India
- Occupations: Poet; writer
- Spouse: Kamalamma
- Children: 3
- Relatives: Dasarathi Krishnamacharya (brother)
- Writing career
- Notable awards: Kala Ratna

Dasaradhi Rangacharya (24 August 1928 – 7 June 2015), also spelled Dasarathi Rangacharya, was an Indian poet and writer in the Telugu language. He participated actively in the Telangana armed struggle against the rule of the Nizams. His writings incorporated the lifestyle of the people of Telangana under the rule of the Nizams. He was conferred with Kala Ratna award in 2001.

== Personal life ==
Dasaradhi Rangacharya was born on 24 August 1928 in Hyderabad State (in present-day Telangana). Upon being expelled from school, he moved to Vijayawada for further education. He was married to Kamalamma and had a son and two daughters. His brother, Dasarathi Krishnamacharya, was also a writer.

== Career ==
Dasaradhi started working as a teacher during 1951 to 1957. Later he moved to Hyderabad and worked between 1957 and 1988 in the municipal corporation in Secunderabad Division.

== Writings ==
Dasaradhi incorporated the lifestyle of the people of Telangana under the rule of Nizam of Hyderabad in his novels, and he became a great writer in Telangana. He came into prominence after his trilogy novels Chillara Devullu (transl. The lesser deities), Modugu Poolu (transl. Fire flowers) and Janapadam. He wrote them in the Telangana dialect against the counsel of his peers. These are considered "rarest of the great novels produced in Telangana" on the account of feudalism and lower literacy rate present in then Telangana region. Chillara Devullu was published in 1969 and was adapted into a 1977 Telugu movie by the same name–Chillara Devullu.

Other novels that he wrote include Srimadramayanam (Ramayana), Sri Mahabharatam (Mahabharata), Devadasu Uttaralu (transl. Letters from Devdas (character)), Chaturveda Samhita, Amrutha Upanishathu and Amruthangamaya among others. "Maya Jalataru", "Sara Talpam" and "Ranunnadi Edi Nizam". He translated the four Vedas into the Telugu language. He wrote his autobiography under the title Jeevanayanam (transl. Journey of life).

== Awards ==
Dasaradhi was conferred with Kala Ratna in 2001 by the government of United Andhra Pradesh.

== Death ==
Dasaradhi died on 8 June 2015 in Yashoda Hospitals in Somajiguda and was given a state funeral by the Government of Telangana.
