= List of Telugu films of 1987 =

This is a list of Telugu language films released in the year 1987.

== Top Grossing films ==
- Pasivadi Pranam
- Dongamogudu
- Aha Naa Pellanta
- Muvva Gopaludu
- Majnu
- Swayam Krushi
- Srinivasa Kalyanam
- Bhale Mogudu
- Makutemleni Maharaju
- Shrutilayalu
- Pushpaka Vimana

== List of released films ==
=== January - March ===
Opening		Title	Director	Cast	Production	Ref
J A N	1	America Abbayi	Singeetam Srinivasa Rao	Master Shravan Shankar, Rajasekhar, Satyanarayana Kaikala, Radhika, Charan Raj, Gummadi	Annapurna Pictures	
J A N	1	Aatma Bandhuvulu	Dasari Narayana Rao	Akkineni Nageswara Rao, Jayasudha		
J A N	1	Dabbevariki Chedu	Relangi Narasimha Rao	Rajendra Prasad, Seetha, Suthi Veerabhadra Rao		
J A N	9	Donga Mogudu	A. Kodandarami Reddy	Chiranjeevi, Madhavi, Radhika		
J A N	14	Thandri Kodukula Challenge	M. Mallikarjuna Rao	Krishna, Radha, Sumalatha	Vijaya Padmalaya Pictures	
J A N	14	Majnu	Dasari Narayana Rao	Nagarjuna, Rajani, Moon Moon Sen, K. R. Vijaya, Subhalekha Sudhakar	Taraka Prabhu Films	
J A N	14	Bhargava Ramudu	A. Kodandarami Reddy	Balakrishna, Vijayashanti, Sharada		
J A N	14	Samsaram Oka Chadarangam	S. P. Muthuraman	Gollapudi Maruti Rao, Sarath Babu, Rajendra Prasad, Suhasini	AVM Productions	
F E B	26	Allari Krishnayya	Nandamuri Ramesh	Nandamuri Balakrishna, Bhanupriya	Vanitha Arts	
M A R	6	Lawyer Suhasini	Vamsy	Bhanu Chander, Rajendra Prasad, Maniratnam		
M A R	13	Makutamleni Maharaju	K. Bapayya	Krishna, Sridevi, Rajendra Prasad, Chandra Mohan		
M A R	19	Chinnari Devatha	L. Raja	Arjun, Seetha, Sasikala, Baby Shalini		
M A R	20	Sankeertana	Geetha Krishna	Nagarjuna, Ramya Krishna, Sharath Babu		
M A R	22	Sardar Dharmanna	Barisetty Bhaskara Rao	Krishnam Raju, Jayasudha		
M A R	25	Nakoo Pellam Kavali	Vijaya Bapineedu	Rajendra Prasad, Shantipriya, Chandra Mohan, Nirmalamma, Nutan Prasad	Vasu Rao	
M A R	27	Aradhana	Bharathiraja	Chiranjeevi, Suhasini, Radhika, Rajasekhar	Geetha Arts	
M A R	27	Kaboye Alludu	Relangi Narasimha Rao	Rajendra Prasad, Chandra Mohan, Shantipriya		

=== April—June ===
Opening		Title	Director	Cast	Studio	Ref
A P R	8	Collector Gari Abbai	B. Gopal	Akkineni Nageshwara Rao, Nagarjuna, Rajani, Sharada, Kota Srinivasa Rao		
A P R	11	Padamati Sandhya Ragam	Jandhyala	Vijayashanti, Thomas Jane		
A P R	13	Sahasa Samrat	K. Raghavendra Rao	Balakrishna, Vijayashanti		
A P R	24	Thene Manasulu	Rajendra Singh Babu	Krishna, Jaya Prada, Suhasini Maniratnam		
A P R	30	Sruthilayalu	K. Vishwanath	Rajasekhar, Sumalatha, Satyanarayana Kaikala, Naresh		
A P R	30	Lawyer Bharathi Devi	K. Rama Mohan Rao	Sarada, Kalyan Chakravarty, Monisha Unni		
M A Y	1	Dharmapatni	T. L. V. Prasad	Suman, Bhanupriya, Rajendra Prasad		
M A Y	8	Ajeyudu	G. Ram Mohan Rao	Daggubati Venkatesh, Shobana		
M A Y	12	President Gari Abbai	Kodi Ramakrishna	Balakrishna, Suhasini, Sharada		
M A Y	19	Muvva Gopaludu	Kodi Ramakrishna	Nandamuri Balakrishna, Vijayashanti		
M A Y	29	Bharatamlo Arjunudu	K. Raghavendra Rao	Daggubati Venkatesh, Khushbu, Sudhakar	Chakravarthy	
J U N	4	Chakravarthy	Raviraja Pinisetty	Chiranjeevi, Mohan Babu, Bhanupriya, Somayajulu	Chakravarthy	
J U N	5	Brahma Nayudu	Dasari Narayana Rao	Krishnam Raju, Sujatha, Suhasini		
J U N	11	Sardar Krishnama Naidu	A. Kodandarami Reddy	Krishna, Vijayashanti, Sharada		
J U N	23	Prema Samrat	Mohan Gandhi	Suman, Bhanupriya	Satyam	
J U N	24	Trimurtulu	K. Murali Mohan Rao	Daggubati Venkatesh, Arjun Sarja, Rajendra Prasad, Shobana		

=== July—September ===
Opening		Title	Director	Cast	Studio	Ref
J U L	3	Muddayi	K. S. R. Das	Krishna, Vijayashanti, Radha		
J U L	8	Maa Ooru	B. Narsing Rao			
J U L	16	Sankharavam	Krishna	Krishna, Bhanupriya, Rajani, Mahesh Babu		
J U L	16	Gandhinagar Rendava Veedhi	P. N. Ramachandra Rao	Rajendra Prasad, Chandra Mohan, Gautami		
J U L	23	Pasivadi Pranam	A. Kodandarami Reddy	Chiranjeevi, Vijayashanti, Sumalatha, Tiger Prabhakar		
J U L	31	Ramu	Y. Nageshwara Rao	Balakrishna, Rajani, Jaggayya, Sharada		
A U G	6	Gundamma Gari Krishnulu	Relangi Narasimha Rao	Rajendra Prasad, Rajani, Subhalekha Sudhakar	K. V. Mahadevan	
A U G	14	Agni Putrudu	K. Raghavendra Rao	Akkineni Nageshwara Rao, Sivaji Ganesan, Sharada, Nagarjuna, Rajani	Chakravarthy	
A U G	14	Brahma Nayudu	Dasari Narayana Rao	Krishnam Raju, Sujatha, Suhasini		
A U G	14	Vijetha Vikram	S. S. Ravichandra	Daggubati Venkatesh, Farah		
A U G	14	Viswanatha Nayakudu	Dasari Narayana Rao	Mohan Babu, Krishna, Krishnam Raju, Jaya Pradha, K. R. Vijaya		
A U G	21	Manmadha Leela Kamaraju Gola	Relangi Narasimha Rao	Rajendra Prasad, Chandra Mohan, Kalpana		
S E P	3	Swayamkrushi	K. Vishwanath	Chiranjeevi, Sumalatha, Vijayashanti		
S E P	11	Dammit Katha Addam Thirigindi	K. Vasu	Rajendra Prasad, Chandra Mohan, Naresh, Jeevitha		
S E P	16	Madana Gopaludu	P. S. Krishna Mohan Reddy	Rajendra Prasad, Ramya Krishna		
S E P	24	Bhale Mogudu	Relangi Narasimha Rao	Rajendra Prasad, Rajani, Ramya Krishna		
S E P	25	Srinivasa Kalyanam	Kodi Ramakrishna	Daggubati Venkatesh, Gautami, Bhanupriya		

=== October—December ===
Opening		Title	Director	Cast	Studio	Ref
O C T	23	Srimathi Oka Bahumathi	Visu	Chandra Mohan, Naresh, Jayasudha	Shankar–Ganesh	
O C T	30	Maa Voori Magadu	K. Bapaiah	Krishna, Jayanthi, Sridevi		
N O V	12	Kirai Dada	A. Kodandarami Reddy	Nagarjuna, Amala, Vanisri, Nutan Prasad, Kota Srinivasa Rao		
N O V	18	Bhanumati Gari Mogudu	A. Kodandarami Reddy	Balakrishna, Vijayashanti, Ashwini, Giribabu		
N O V	27	Pushpaka Vimanam	Singeetham Srinivasa Rao	Kamal Haasan, Amala, Amjad Khan, Tinnu Anand		
N O V	27	Aha Naa-Pellanta!	Jandhyala	Rajendra Prasad, Rajani, Kota Srinivasa Rao, Nutan Prasad, Brahmanandam		
D E C	3	Aahuthi				
D E C	4	Muddu Bidda	P. Chandrasekhara Reddy	Krishna, Rajani		
D E C	25	Jebu Donga	A. Kodandarami Reddy	Chiranjeevi, Bhanupriya, Radha		
D E C	31	Donga Garu Swagatham	G. Ram Mohana Rao	Krishna, Vijayashanti, Jaggayya		
D E C	31	Maharshi	Vamsy	Shantipriya, Krishna Bhagavan		
