= Gaduggayi =

1989 film

- DVD cover
- Directed by: Sarath
- Written by: Satyanand
- Screenplay by: Sarath
- Produced by: Smt. A. Sesharatnam
- Starring: Rajendra Prasad; Rajani
- Cinematography: Sarath
- Edited by: Raghu-Bapu
- Music by: Chakravarthy
- Production company: Gopi Films
- Release date: 25 May 1989
- Running time: 127 minutes
- Country: India
- Language: Telugu

Gaduggayi (transl. Clever) is a 1989 Indian Telugu-language comedy film directed by Sarath. It stars Rajendra Prasad and Rajani, with music composed by Chakravarthy.

== Cast ==
- Rajendra Prasad as Gopi / Pandu
- Rajani as Amala
- Satyanarayana as Bhushayya
- Gollapudi Maruti Rao as Gandabherundam
- Kota Srinivasa Rao as Papa Rao
- Allu Ramalingaiah as Lawyer Chidanandam
- Suthi Velu as Babji
- Raavi Kondala Rao as Suryam Master
- Prasad Babu as Prasad
- Bhimeswara Rao as Koteswara Rao
- Potti Prasad as Panakalu
- Ramana Reddy as Buchi
- Pandari Bai as Parvathi
- Suryakantham as Kanthamma
- Tatineni Rajeswari as Lakshmi
- Kuyili as Mangi

== Music ==
Music was composed by Chakravarthy. Lyrics were written by Veturi.

Song title	Singers	length
"Tuneega"	S. P. Balasubrahmanyam	3:59
"Neluvalenu"	S. P. Balasubrahmanyam, S. Janaki	3:25
"Kasikasiga"	S. P. Balasubrahmanyam, P. Susheela	3:30
"Pooletena"	S. P. Balasubrahmanyam, Lalitha Sagari	3:58

== Reception ==
K. Ram writing for Andhra Patrika on 21 August 1989, stated that director Sharath, has filled the film with comedy with a good dosage of stunts and suspense.
