= Sahasa Samrat =

- Theatrical release poster
- Directed by: K. Raghavendra Rao
- Written by: Ganesh Patro (dialogues)
- Screenplay by: K. Raghavendra Rao
- Produced by: K. C. Shekar Babu
- Starring: Nandamuri Balakrishna; Vijayashanti
- Cinematography: K. S. Prakash
- Edited by: Kotagiri Venkateswara Rao
- Music by: Chakravarthy
- Production company: Devi Kamal Movies
- Release date: 13 April 1987
- Running time: 146 mins
- Country: India
- Language: Telugu

Sahasa Samrat (transl. Adventurous emperor) is a 1987 Telugu-language action drama film directed by K. Raghavendra Rao. The film stars Nandamuri Balakrishna, Vijayashanti and music was composed by Chakravarthy. It was produced by K. C. Sekhar Babu under the Devi Kamal Movies banner. The film was recorded as a flop at the box office.

The film was originally titled Samrat, but a title dispute with actor Krishna, who was making a film with the same name, led to the title being changed to Sahasa Samrat shortly before its release. Despite the controversy, both films were box office failures.

== Plot ==
The film opens in a village where Ramudu, a well-liked and good-natured young man, is raised by his grandmother. He serves as a loyal worker for Raghavayya, a respected village elder. However, Paidi Kondayya, a local troublemaker, along with his son Gallibabu, terrorizes the villagers. Rani, Raghavayya's daughter, returns home after completing her studies and falls in love with Ramudu. Fearing her greedy mother Rathalu, they decide to keep their relationship a secret. Rathalu seeks Paidi Kondayya's help and accuses Ramudu of wrongdoing, leading to his condemnation.

Ramudu is rescued by Chakradhar Rao, a double amputee who was also wronged by Paidi Kondayya. Chakradhar Rao mentors Ramudu, transforming him into a skilled and knowledgeable man within six months. Ramudu returns with a new identity, "Samrat," and puts an end to Paidi Kondayya's tyranny.

Chakradhar Rao reveals his tragic past: he lived with his sister Seeta and brother-in-law Chandra Shekar, an honest police officer. During a temple festival, Chandra Shekar was framed for stealing jewelry by Paidi Kondayya. As a result, Chandra Shekar and Seeta committed suicide, leaving their child behind. Paidi Kondayya's men later assaulted Chakradhar Rao, leaving him disabled.

In a final revelation, Ramudu's grandmother discloses that Ramudu is Chakradhar Rao's nephew. In the end, Ramudu defeats the villains and marries Rani, concluding the story on a happy note.

== Cast ==
- Nandamuri Balakrishna as Ramudu
- Vijayashanti as Rani
- Rao Gopal Rao as Raghavayya
- Gollapudi Maruti Rao as Advocate Chakradhar Rao
- Nutan Prasad as Pilliganthula Appala Veera Paidi Kondayya Samantharaju
- Sudhakar as Galli Babu
- Chalapathi Rao as Bandodu
- Rallapalli as Paramanamdam
- Rajesh as Malligadu
- Sridhar as Inspector Chandra Shekar
- Hema Sundar as Sarabhayya
- P. J. Sarma as S. P. Venkateswara Rao
- Chitti Babu as Chitti
- Chidatala Appa Rao as Krishna Murthy
- Telephone Satyanarayana as Judge
- Dham
- Rama Prabha as Rathalu
- Mucharlla Aruna as Sampangi
- Varalakshmi
- Shubha as Seeta
- Y. Vijaya as Tamalapaaku
- Nirmalamma as Ramudu's grandmother

== Production ==
The film faced controversy during its production over the title Samrat. Actor Krishna held the rights to the title and was using it for a film introducing his son Ramesh Babu. When producer K. C. Sekhar Babu refused to change the title of his own film, both projects proceeded with the same name. Eventually, industry leaders intervened, and Sekhar Babu reluctantly changed the title to Sahasa Samrat shortly before its release. Both films, however, were box office failures, making the title dispute irrelevant.

== Music ==
Sahasa Samrat

Film score by Chakravarthy
- Released: 1987
- Genre: Soundtrack
- Length: 26:14
- Label: AVM Audio
- Producer: Chakravarthy

Chakravarthy chronology
Allari Krishnayya (1987)	Sahasa Samrat (1987)	President Gari Abbai (1987)

The music was composed by Chakravarthy and lyrics were written by Veturi. The song "Suvvi Gopalude" is a chartbuster. The music was released on AVM Audio Company.

S. No.	Song title	Singers	length
1	"Puvvattu Kochanu"	S. P. Balasubrahmanyam, P. Susheela	4:09
2	"Orori Sureeda"	S. P. Balasubrahmanyam, S. Janaki	4:39
3	"Tellani Panchelodu"	S. P. Balasubrahmanyam, P. Susheela	4:14
4	"Nee Peruku Joharu"	S. P. Balasubrahmanyam, P. Susheela	4:08
5	"Suvvi Gopalude"	S. P. Balasubrahmanyam, S. Janaki	5:03
6	"Mooti Meeda"	S. P. Balasubrahmanyam, P. Susheela	4:01
