= En Pottukku Sonthakkaran =

- Theatrical release poster
- Directed by: Sekar Raja
- Story by: Jaya Rajendran
- Starring: Ramki; Sasikala; Anju
- Cinematography: R. H. Ashok
- Edited by: S. Ashokkumar
- Music by: Deva
- Production company: Sudalaya Productions
- Distributed by: Pratik Pictures
- Release date: 5 November 1991
- Country: India
- Language: Tamil

En Pottukku Sonthakkaran is a 1991 Indian Tamil-language romance film directed by Sekar Raja and produced by Sudalaya Productions. The film stars Ramki, Sasikala and Anju. It was released on 5 November 1991.

== Cast ==
- Ramki
- Sasikala
- Anju
- Srividya
- Manorama
- Ranjan
- Ravichandran
- Jai Ganesh
- Delhi Ganesh
- Anand
- Vennira Aadai Moorthy
- S. S. Chandran
- Chinni Jayanth
- Nagaraja Chozhan
- Gandhimathi
- Y. Vijaya
- S. N. Parvathy
- Madurai Jayanthi

== Soundtrack ==
The soundtrack was composed by Deva.

Track listing
No.	Title	Lyrics	Performer(s)	Length
1.	"Manasonnu Thudikkuthu"	Piraisoodan	Mano, Swarnalatha	5:07
2.	"Solla Vandha Vaarthai"	Kamakodiyan	Mano, K. S. Chithra	4:44
3.	"Maasi Maasam Poranthiruchu"	Parinaman	Malaysia Vasudevan	4:25
4.	"Onnu Rendu Ennikko"	Parinaman	Gangai Amaran	4:35
5.	"Thoporam Thennam Pillai"	Parinaman	Mano	2:18
6.	"Unnale Nenjam Raagam"	Muthulingam	Mano, K. S. Chithra	4:21
Total length:				25:30

== Release and reception ==
En Pottukku Sonthakkaran was released on 5 November 1991, Diwali day, and was distributed by Pratik Pictures. N. Krishnaswamy of The Indian Express positively reviewed the film for its beginning and some of the cast performances.
