= Karu Diddina Kapuram =

- Theatrical release poster
- Directed by: D. V. Narasa Raju
- Written by: D. V. Narasa Raju
- Produced by: Ramoji Rao
- Starring: Nutan Prasad; Rajendra Prasad; Rama Prabha; Pavithra
- Cinematography: S. Navakanth
- Edited by: Gowtham Raju
- Music by: Satyam
- Production company: Usha Kiran Movies
- Release date: 26 July 1986
- Running time: 126 mins
- Country: India
- Language: Telugu

Karu Diddina Kapuram (transl. A car sets a family right) is a 1986 Indian Telugu-language comedy film, produced by Ramoji Rao under the Usha Kiran Movies banner and directed by D. V. Narasa Raju. It stars Nutan Prasad, Rajendra Prasad, Rama Prabha and Pavithra, with music composed by Satyam.

== Cast ==
- Nutan Prasad as Engineer Raghava Rao
- Rajendra Prasad as Satya Keerthi David
- Rama Prabha as Indumathi
- Pavithra as Suguna Sundari
- Nagesh as Pulla Rao
- Padmanabham as Saree Seller
- Suthi Velu as Manmadha Rao
- Shankar Melkote as New Engineer
- Mada as Seth Kishanlal
- Ali as Paper Boy
- Vidyasagar as Mechanic Kanakaiah
- Tilak as Subba Rao
- Potti Prasad as Traffic Constable
- Mithai Chitti as Astrologer
- Chidatala Appa Rao as Police Inspector
- Satti Babu as Priest
- Dham as Mechanic
- Jenny as Doctor
- Srilakshmi as Hema Sundari
- Sangeeta as Ram Swamy's wife
- Mamatha as Pullamma
- Disco Shanti as Steno Lilly
- Shilpa
- Sri Sailaja as Rupa Sundari
- Chelakala Radha as Servant
- Kalpana Rai as Seth Kishanlal's wife
- Y. Vijaya as Durgamma

== Soundtrack ==
Music composed by Satyam. Lyrics were written by Veturi. Music released on AVM Audio Company.

Song title	Singers	length
"Priya Tulasi Maditelisi"	S. P. Balasubrahmanyam	4:05
"Sari Sari Nee Pani Sari"	S. P. Balasubrahmanyam, S. Janaki	3:51
"Sogasuga Mrudanga Talam"	S. P. Balasubrahmanyam, S. Janaki	4:12
"Silpa Veenalaa"	S. P. Balasubrahmanyam, Vani Jayaram	4:35
"Sagara Madhanam"	S. P. Balasubrahmanyam, S. P. Sailaja	3:41

== Critical reception ==
Reviewing its Tamil dubbed version Car Vandha Neram, Indian Express wrote "Except for the novelty of a car 'strutting' without a driver, there is not much that is new".
