= Attintlo Adde Mogudu =

- DVD cover
- Directed by: Relangi Narasimha Rao
- Written by: Diwakar Babu (dialogues)
- Screenplay by: Relangi Narasimha Rao
- Story by: Kalptaru
- Based on: Ghar Ho To Aisa (1990)
- Produced by: K. C. Reddy
- Starring: Rajendra Prasad; Nirosha
- Cinematography: B. Koteswara Rao
- Edited by: D. Raja Gopal
- Music by: M. M. Keeravani
- Production company: Sri Rajeeva Productions
- Release date: 1991
- Running time: 133 minutes
- Country: India
- Language: Telugu

Attintlo Adde Mogudu (transl. Tenant Husband in Mother-in-law's House) is a 1991 Telugu-language comedy film, produced by K. C. Reddy under the Sri Rajeeva Productions banner and directed by Relangi Narasimha Rao. It stars Rajendra Prasad, Nirosha and music composed by M. M. Keeravani. The film is a remake of the Hindi movie Ghar Ho To Aisa (1990). The film was recorded as a Hit at the box office.

== Cast ==
- Rajendra Prasad as Gopi
- Nirosha as Jhansi
- Gollapudi Maruti Rao as G.M.Rao
- Suthi Velu as Subba Rao
- Ahuti Prasad as Vijay
- Mallikarjuna Rao as Bhaja Govindam
- Chitti Babu as Swamy
- Vankayala Satyanayana as Dwaraka Prasad
- Disco Shanthi as Sony
- Vaishnavi as Sarada
- Deepika as Kanchana
- Chandrika as Milk seller
- Chilakala Radha as Doctor
- Dubbing Janaki as Susheelamma
- Kalpana Rai as Manager
- Y. Vijaya as Durgamma
- Master Baladitya as Gopi's nephew
- Baby Srileka as Puppy

== Soundtrack ==
Attintlo Adde Mogudu

Film score by M. M. Keeravani
- Released: 1991
- Genre: Soundtrack
- Length: 19:53
- Label: LEO Audio
- Producer: M. M. Keeravani

M. M. Keeravani chronology
| Paattondru Ketten (1991) | Attintlo Adde Mogudu (1991) | Allari Mogudu (1992) |

Music composed by M. M. Keeravani. Music released on LEO Audio Company.

| No. | Title | Lyrics | Singer(s) | Length |
|---|---|---|---|---|
| 1. | "Karibitho Cabbarelo" | Veturi | S. P. Balasubrahmanyam, Chitra | 4:10 |
| 2. | "Chalaki Pala Pitta" | Veturi | S. P. Balasubrahmanyam | 3:53 |
| 3. | "Andagada Andhukora" | M.M.Keeravani | Chitra | 4:16 |
| 4. | "Bathroom" | Veturi | S. P. Balasubrahmanyam, Chitra | 3:55 |
| 5. | "Bhaja Govindham" | Veturi | S. P. Balasubrahmanyam, Chitra | 3:44 |
| Total length: | | | | 19:53 |
