= Seetharama Kalyanam (1986 film) =

1986 Indian film by Jandhyala

- Theatrical release poster
- Directed by: Jandhyala
- Written by: Jandhyala (dialogues)
- Screenplay by: Jandhyala; K. Murari
- Story by: Jandhyala; K. Murari
- Produced by: K. Murari
- Starring: Nandamuri Balakrishna; Rajani
- Cinematography: Nandamuri Mohan Krishna
- Edited by: S. Nagababu
- Music by: K. V. Mahadevan
- Production company: Yuva Chitra Arts
- Release date: 15 April 1986
- Running time: 137 minutes
- Country: India
- Language: Telugu

Seetharama Kalyanam is a 1986 Telugu-language drama film directed by Jandhyala and produced K. Murari under the Yuva Chitra Arts banner. The script was co-written by Jandhyala and Murari. The film stars Nandamuri Balakrishna and Rajani in the lead roles, with music composed by K. V. Mahadevan. Seetharama Kalyanam was a commercial success at the box office.

== Plot ==
The film tells the story of a long-standing rivalry between two villages, Ramapuram and Raghavapuram, over the possession of idols of Rama and Sita. The conflict begins when Govindayya, the leader of Ramapuram, arranges the marriage of his daughter Janaki to Rangayya, a prominent figure in Raghavapuram. Their union brings peace between the villages, and a romance blossoms between Rangayya’s younger brother, Raja, and Govindayya’s niece, Lakshmi, the daughter of his younger brother Subbaramayya.

The situation escalates when the two villages inadvertently uncover the Rama and Sita idols at their border, leading to a violent confrontation. During the ensuing bloodshed, Rangayya’s father is killed by Subbaramayya, which prompts Rangayya to vow revenge. The conflict deepens, leading to the declaration of a bitter feud between Raja and Hari, Subbaramayya’s son. The matter is taken to court, and Rangayya is sentenced to life imprisonment, while Govindayya moves to the city with his family.

Years later, Rangayya is released from prison, but the legal battle over the statues continues. Raja and Lakshmi, now college students, rekindle their childhood romance, but Govindayya and Hari do everything in their power to prevent their union. Meanwhile, Govindayya’s cunning brother-in-law, Narayana, plans to marry Lakshmi to his son Varma. Tragedy strikes when Hari and Narayana accidentally kill Rangayya, which leads Govindayya to realize the futility of the feud.

In the end, Govindayya reconciles with Raja and Lakshmi, allowing them to marry. The film concludes with a joyous celebration in the village, where the festival of the deities is performed, symbolizing the restoration of peace and unity.

== Cast ==
- Nandamuri Balakrishna as Raja
- Rajani as Lakshmi
- Gollapudi Maruti Rao as Narayana
- Jaggayya as Govindayya
- Sreedhar as Police Officer
- Ramakrishna as Rangayya
- Suthi Velu as Librarian
- Rajesh as Hari
- Girish Pradhan as Varma
- Subhalekha Sudhakar as Maruthi
- Telephone Satyanarayana as Lawyer
- Ch. Krishna Murthy as Subbaramayya
- M. Vasudeva Murthy as College Principal
- Jeeva as a villager
- Rama Prabha as Narayana's wife
- Sangeetha as Janaki
- Mucharlla Aruna as Latha
- Kalpana Rai as Librarian's wife
- EVV Satyanarayana as Hari's Friend (Uncredited Role)

== Soundtrack ==
Sita Rama Kalyanam

Film score by K. V. Mahadevan
- Released: 1986
- Genre: Soundtrack
- Length: 26:52
- Label: AVM Audio
- Producer: K. V. Mahadevan

K. V. Mahadevan chronology
Muddula Krishnaiah (1986)	Sita Rama Kalyanam (1986)	Muvva Gopaludu (1987)

The music for Seetharama Kalyanam was composed by K. V. Mahadevan and released by AVM Audio Company. The song "Rallallo Isakallo" became particularly popular.

S. No.	Song title	lyrics	Singers	length
1	"Kalyana Vaibhogame"	Acharya Aatreya	S. P. Balasubrahmanyam, P. Susheela	4:30
2	"Rallallo Isakallo"	Acharya Aatreya	S. P. Balasubrahmanyam, P. Susheela	4:16
3	"Emani Paadanu"	Veturi	S. P. Balasubrahmanyam, P. Susheela	4:22
4	"Sarigamapadani"	Aarudhra	S. P. Balasubrahmanyam, P. Susheela	4:59
5	"Enta Nerchina"	Acharya Aatreya	S. P. Balasubrahmanyam, P. Susheela	4:14
6	"Veellu Vaallu"	Acharya Aatreya	S. P. Balasubrahmanyam, P. Susheela	4:31
