= Rendu Rellu Aaru =

- Theatrical release poster
- Directed by: Jandhyala
- Written by: Jandhyala (screenplay / dialogues)
- Story by: Malladi Venkata Krishna Murthy
- Produced by: Gogineni Subba Rao; K.Shanthi Kumar (presents)
- Starring: Rajendra Prasad; Chandra Mohan; Rajani; Preethi
- Cinematography: B. Koteswara Rao
- Edited by: Gautam Raju
- Music by: Rajan–Nagendra
- Production company: Vijaya Creations
- Release date: 11 January 1986
- Running time: 127 min
- Country: India
- Language: Telugu

Rendu Rellu Aaru (transl. Two Twos are Six stylised as 2 × 2 = 6) is a 1986 Indian Telugu-language comedy film, produced by Gogineni Subba Rao under Vijaya Creations banner and directed by Jandhyala. It stars Rajendra Prasad, Chandra Mohan, Rajani, Preethi and features music composed by Rajan–Nagendra. E. V. V. Satyanarayana worked as associate director to the film. The story is based on a novel of same name by Malladi Venkata Krishna Murthy.

== Cast ==
- Rajendra Prasad as Venkatasivam / Madhusudhan Rao - Mad
- Chandra Mohan as Sadguna Rao - Sad
- Rajani as Vindhya
- Preeti as Vighneswari / Keertana
- Pucha Poornanandam as Sarvanandam
- Suthi Veerabhadra Rao as Iravatham
- Suthi Velu as Gireesam
- Dr. B. V. Pattabhiram as himself
- Rallapalli as Tikamaka Rao
- P. L. Narayana as Dattatreya
- Sakshi Ranga Rao as Jagapati Rao
- Potti Prasad as Swamiji
- Bheemeswara Rao as beggar
- Sri Lakshmi as Lalitha
- Kakinada Syamala as Hidimbi
- Dubbing Janaki as Dattatreya's wife
- Jayasree
- Master Harish as young Venkata Sivam
- Baby Meena as young Vighneswari

== Soundtrack ==
Rendu Rella Aaru

Film score by Rajan–Nagendra
- Released: 1986
- Genre: Soundtrack
- Label: AVM Audio
- Producer: Rajan–Nagendra

Music composed by Rajan–Nagendra. Lyrics were written by Veturi. Music released on AVM Audio Company. The tune of the song Viraha Veena was adapted from music director's own Kannada song Olida Jeeva from the 1983 Kannada film Benkiya Bale.

S.No	Song title	Singers	Length
1	"Kastandhuko"	S. P. Balasubrahmanyam, S. Janaki	4:06
2	"Johar Pellama"	S. P. Balasubrahmanyam, S. Janaki	4:25
3	"Viraha Veena"	S. Janaki	
