= Madras Vathiyar =

- Poster
- Directed by: Vijaya Bhaskar
- Written by: A. L. Narayanan
- Produced by: T. Raman
- Starring: Vijayakanth; Sasikala; Anuradha
- Cinematography: D. Rajagopal
- Edited by: R. Bhaskar
- Music by: Shankar–Ganesh
- Production company: Jaigeetha Movies
- Release date: 14 January 1984
- Country: India
- Language: Tamil

Madras Vathiyar (/mɛdrɑːs vɑːðjɑːr/ transl. Teacher from Madras) is a 1984 Indian Tamil-language film directed by Vijaya Bhaskar and written by A. L. Narayanan. The film stars Vijayakanth, Sasikala and Anuradha. It was released on 14 January 1984.

== Cast ==
- Vijayakanth
- Sasikala
- Anuradha
- Manorama
- Kallapetti Singaram
- Loose Mohan
- Balaji
- K. Kannan
- C. L. Anandan
- Senthamarai
- G. Srinivasan
- Veeraraghavan
- Rowdy Rathinam
- Usilai Mani
- Haja Sheriff

== Soundtrack ==
The music was composed by Shankar–Ganesh.

Track listing
No.	Title	Lyrics	Singer(s)	Length
1.	"Madras Vathiyar"	Vaali	Vivek Sarathy, Vani Jairam, Manorama and chorus	4:50
2.	"Naatiyam Paarthukka"	Vaali	Vani Jairam	3:53
3.	"Chekka Chevantha"	Muthulingam	Malaysia Vasudevan, Vani Jairam	4:23
4.	"Vizhigale"	Muthulingam	P. Jayachandran, Latha Kannan	3:58
Total length:				17:04

== Release and reception ==
Madras Vathiyar was released on 14 January 1984. Jayamanmadhan of Kalki gave the film a negative review criticising the story and music and dependence on Sasikala and Anuradha.
