= Sengathu =

- Directed by: Indhu Nathan
- Written by: Indhu Nathan
- Produced by: S. A. Jalavudhin
- Starring: Amaran; Payal
- Cinematography: Muthra
- Edited by: Raja Mohamed
- Music by: Arafin Yusuf
- Production company: TKM Films
- Release date: 6 October 2006
- Running time: 110 minutes
- Country: India
- Language: Tamil

Sengathu (transl. Red) is a 2006 Indian Tamil language romantic drama film directed by Indhu Nathan. The film stars newcomer Amaran and Payal, with Ilavarasu, Kovai Desingu, Kuyili, Srinivasa Gurukkal, Lalitha Mani and Master Ashwin playing supporting roles. The film, produced by S. A. Jalavudhin, was released on 6 October 2006. The film got a subsidy from the Government of Tamil Nadu for making a quality budget Tamil film and for releasing it under a Tamil title.

== Plot ==
Mukhil (Amaran), an army officer, returns to his village for his holidays. Upon his return, he meets the bubbly girl Indhu (Payal) who seems to be mentally ill. Mukhil lives with his widow mother Chellamma (Kuyili) and his immature uncle Yedhukku (Ilavarasu). One day, Mukhil saves Indhu who was sexually harassed by some rowdies and he beats them up. Mukhil starts having suspicions about the way Indhu was behaving, so one day, he forcibly kisses her on the mouth to see her reaction. Indhu scolds him for behaving like that and spits on his face. Indhu belongs to a poor family, she lives with her sick grandmother and her little brother Suresh. Mukhil then apologizes for his disgusting act to Indhu and he professes his love to her but she doesn't respond. Mukhil was so desperate to figure out why Indhu is acting like a mentally ill person, so he asks her to tell him the whole story the next day otherwise he will consider suicide. The next day, Indhu's grandmother dies, therefore, she could not meet Mukhil, so Mukhil attempts to commit suicide but the villagers save him. Later, Indhu accepts his love and reveals to the villagers that she is not mentally ill.

A few years ago, Indhu witnessed a government official being killed by the village bigwig Malayandi (Kovai Desingu). In the past, she was born to a devadasi (prostitute) and her mother died during childbirth. As per the village custom, Indhu must be brought up by a Brahmin family and at the age of majority, she had to become a devadasi. Seenu (Srinivasa Gurukkal) adopted her but when she hit puberty, he refused his daughter to be a devadasi. Seenu knew that he could not change his daughter's faith so he chose to commit suicide. Since that day, Indhu has to act like a mentally ill person to not become a devadasi.

The village court decides to send Indhu to Malayandi's village. Malayandi plans to get married with Indhu thus she will become a devadasi. Chellamma then orders her son to save his lover from this evil practice. Mukhil enters their village and fights with Malayandi's henchmen, during the fight, Mukhil was deeply wounded by the henchmen. He manages to knock Malayandi out and stops the wedding, he then advises the villagers to abolish this ancestral practice. Malayandi asks for forgiveness and he decides to become a good man. The film ends with Mukhil and Indhu leaving Malayandi's village hand in hand.

== Cast ==
- Amaran as Mukhil
- Payal as Indhu
- Ilavarasu as Yedhukku
- Kovai Desingu as Malayandi
- Kuyili as Chellamma
- Srinivasa Gurukkal as Seenu, Indhu's father
- Lalitha Mani as Indhu's grandmother
- Master Ashwin as Suresh
- Madurai Kumaresan as Veerasamy
- A. K. Natarajan as Nattamai
- Kovai Senthil as Tea master
- Citizen Mani as Tea master
- Chinrasu as Tea master
- Risha in a special appearance

== Production ==
Indhu Nathan made his directorial debut with Sengathu under the banner of TKM Films. Newcomer Amaran (credited as Nishanth), the brother of the film producer S. A. Jalavudhin, was cast to play the lead role while Payal was chosen to play the heroine.

== Soundtrack ==
Sengathu

Soundtrack album by Arafin Yusuf
- Released: 18 September 2006
- Recorded: 2006
- Genre: Feature film soundtrack
- Length: 31:36
- Producer: Arafin Yusuf

The film score and the soundtrack were composed by Arafin Yusuf. The soundtrack, released in 2006, features 6 tracks written by Snehan and Kabilan.

Tracklist
No.	Title	Singer(s)	Length
1.	"A Padamma"	Manikka Vinayagam, Roshini	4:35
2.	"Kathu Visuthada"	Tippu, Theni Kunjarammal	5:57
3.	"Kundhal Paravai"	Prasanna, Saindhavi	4:55
4.	"Instrumental"	Vijay Yesudas	5:29
5.	"Thee Thee"	Harish Raghavendra	5:29
6.	"Ulagam"	Srivardhini	5:11
Total length:			31:36

== Reception ==
Malini Mannath said, "It's a debutant's work and it shows throughout. Nishanth plays his part adequately. Payal compensates for her average looks with some good expressions. The Ilavarasu-related episodes are in bad taste".
