= President Gari Abbai =

- Theatrical release poster
- Directed by: T. Rama Rao
- Screenplay by: T. Rama Rao
- Story by: Paruchuri Brothers
- Produced by: A. V. Subba Rao
- Starring: Nandamuri Balakrishna; Suhasini
- Cinematography: Nandamuri Mohana Krishna
- Edited by: J. Krishna Swamy; Balu
- Music by: Chakravarthy
- Production company: Prasad Art Pictures
- Release date: 12 May 1987
- Running time: 141 minutes
- Country: India
- Language: Telugu

President Gari Abbai (transl. President's son) is a 1987 Indian Telugu-language drama film, produced by A. V. Subba Rao under the Prasad Art Pictures banner and directed by T. Rama Rao. It stars Nandamuri Balakrishna and Suhasini. The music was composed by Chakravarthy.

== Cast ==
- Nandamuri Balakrishna as Ramakrishna
- Suhasini as Latha
- Satyanarayana as Suraiah
- Jaggayya as President Chandraiah
- Nutan Prasad as Delhi Babai
- Paruchuri Venkateswara Rao as Govindaiah
- Sudhakar as Prasad
- Sakshi Ranga Rao as Seshavataram
- P. L. Narayana as Sambaiah
- K. K. Sarma as T. C.
- Rajesh as Raja
- Raj Varma as Papa Rao
- Eeswar Rao as Sivaram
- Ramji as Venu
- Ramana Reddy as Thokachukka
- Vankayala Satyanayana as Subbaramaiah
- Madan Mohan as Engineer
- Ch Krishna Murthy as Lawyer
- Dham as Paamula Narasaiah
- Annapurna as Anasuya
- Rajya Lakshmi as Satyavathi
- Varalakshmi as Purna
- Kakinada Shymala as Gayatri Devi
- Kuyili as item number
- Y. Vijaya as Kamala
- Nirmalamma as Lakshmamma
- Master Rajesh as Gopi

== Soundtrack ==
President Gari Abbai

Film score by Chakravarthy
- Released: 1987
- Genre: Soundtrack
- Length: 19:32
- Label: LEO Audio
- Producer: Chakravarthy

Chakravarthy chronology
Collector Gari Abbai (1987)	President Gari Abbai (1987)	Agni Putrudu (1987)

The music was composed by Chakravarthy. Lyrics were written by Veturi. The music was released by the LEO Audio Company.

S. No	Song title	Singers	length
1	"Muddu Pettakunte"	S. P. Balasubrahmanyam	3:27
2	"Chekkam Chekkam"	S. P. Balasubrahmanyam, P. Susheela	3:30
3	"Egirindi Egirindi"	S. P. Balasubrahmanyam, P. Susheela	4:10
4	"Sitrabngi Pilindi"	S. P. Balasubrahmanyam, S. Janaki	4:20
5	"Yadanundi Vasthe"	P. Susheela	4:05

== Other ==
- VCDs and DVDs were released by Moser Baer Home Videos, Hyderabad.
