= Thanga Mama 3D =

- Title card
- Directed by: Simon V Kurian
- Written by: Chitralaya Gopu
- Starring: Arun; Sasikala; M. N. Nambiar
- Music by: Ilaiyaraaja
- Production company: FilmCo
- Release date: 6 September 1985
- Running time: 125 minutes
- Country: India
- Language: Tamil

Thanga Mama 3D is a 1985 Indian Tamil-language film directed by Simon V Kurian, starring Arun and Sasikala. It was released on 6 September 1985.

== Cast ==
- Arun as Ravi
- Sasikala as Radha
- M. N. Nambiar
- Vinu Chakravarthy
- Manorama
- Sivachandran

== Production ==
Thanga Mama 3D is the second 3D film made in Tamil film industry after Annai Bhoomi.

== Soundtrack ==
The soundtrack was composed by Ilaiyaraaja, with lyrics by Vaali.

Track	Singers	Duration
"Itho Mazhai Thuli..."	S. Janaki, Ramesh	4:36
"Malligai Panthaa..."	S. Janaki	4:37
"Vaan Veliyil Vannap Paravai..."	Ilaiyaraaja, K. S. Chithra	4:39
