= Bandhuvulostunnaru Jagratha =

- Title card
- Directed by: Sarath
- Written by: Satyanand (dialogues)
- Screenplay by: Sarath
- Story by: Girija Sri Bhagawan
- Produced by: Chalasani Sarath Babu
- Starring: Rajendra Prasad; Rajani
- Cinematography: Sarath
- Edited by: Raghu-Bapu
- Music by: Chakravarthy
- Production company: Sena Creations
- Release date: 20 January 1989
- Running time: 120 minutes
- Country: India
- Language: Telugu

Bandhuvulostunnaru Jagratha (transl. Relatives are coming, be careful!) is a 1989 Indian Telugu-language comedy film directed by Sarath. It stars Rajendra Prasad, Rajani, and music composed by Chakravarthy. The film was a box office hit.

== Cast ==
- Rajendra Prasad as Chittibabu
- Rajani as Satya
- Satyanarayana as Subba Rao
- Kota Srinivasa Rao as Surayya
- Gollapudi Maruti Rao as Chittibabu's distant relative
- Subhalekha Sudhakar as Sudhakar
- Suthi Velu as Kistayya
- Brahmanandam as Bandhu Murthy
- Raavi Kondala Rao as Pedda Kondaiah
- Vennira Aadai Moorthy as Yeddirajula Naidu
- Chitti Babu as Chittibabu's friend
- Potti Prasad as Chittibabu's friend
- Satti Babu as Sarveswara Rao
- Suryakantham as Sundaramma
- Annapurna as Annapurna
- Sri Lakshmi as Lakshmi
- Radha Kumari as Pedda Kondaiah's wife
- Tatineni Rajeswari as Seetamma
- Kalpana Rai as Mary / Mangatayaru
- Y. Vijaya as Baby

== Soundtrack ==
Bandhuvulostunnaru Jagratha

Film score by Chakravarthy
- Released: 1989
- Genre: Soundtrack
- Length: 22:52
- Label: AMC Audio
- Producer: Chakravarthy

Chakravarthy chronology
Mamathala Kovela (1989)	Bandhuvulostunnaru Jagratha (1989)	Yamapasam (1989)

Music composed by Chakravarthy. Lyrics were written by Veturi. Music is released on AMC Audia Company

S. No	Song title	Singers	length
1	"Maa Siriki Mee Hariki"	S. P. Balasubrahmanyam, P. Susheela	3:51
2	"Andala"	S. P. Balasubrahmanyam, P. Susheela	4:35
3	''Aa Aa Ho''	S. P. Balasubrahmanyam, P. Susheela	4:09
4	"Madhura Madana"	S. P. Balasubrahmanyam, P. Susheela	4:18
5	"Mundhu Pakka"	S. P. Balasubrahmanyam, P. Susheela	4:02
6	"Bandhuvulostunnaru Jagratha"	S. P. Balasubrahmanyam	3:52
