= Jai Karnataka =

- VCD cover
- Directed by: Dwarakish
- Written by: Chi. Udaya Shankar
- Screenplay by: Dwarakish
- Story by: Salim–Javed
- Based on: Mr. India by Shekhar Kapur
- Produced by: Dwarakish
- Starring: Ambareesh; Rajani; Jr Narasimharaju; Mukhyamantri Chandru
- Cinematography: Deviprasad
- Edited by: Gouthama Raju
- Music by: Vijay Anand
- Production company: Dwarakish Chithra
- Distributed by: Dwarakish Chithra
- Release date: 11 October 1989
- Running time: 132 min
- Country: India
- Language: Kannada

Jai Karnataka is a 1989 Indian Kannada-language superhero film, directed and produced by Dwarakish. The film stars Ambareesh, Rajani and Mukhyamantri Chandru in the lead roles. The film was a remake of the Hindi film Mr. India.

== Cast ==
- Ambareesh as Arun
- Rajani as Seema
- Mukhyamantri Chandru as Teja
- Captain Raju as Mogambo
- Jr. Narasimharaju as Panchanga
- Shivaram
- Rathnakar
- Chethan Ramarao
- Master Abhishek
- Pranaya Murthy

== Production ==
Dwarakish, who had the Tamil remake rights of Priyadarshan's Malayalam film Chithram, exchanged it in lieu of Kannada rights of Mr. India after K. Balaji, the producer of Mr. India's Tamil remake, suggested him to remake the film in Kannada. Due to Dwarakish's financial situation, Ambareesh agreed to work in the film without pay. The film was completed within three months.

== Soundtrack ==
The music was composed by Vijayanand.

- "Hawa Hawaii" - S. Janaki
- "I Love You" - S. P. Balasubrahmanyam, Vani Jairam
- Naguve Hoovanthe Aluve Mullanthe - K. J. Yesudas
- Chinna Beda Belli Beda -
- Ananda Kodalende Naanilli Odi Bande -

== Release ==
One of Dwarakish's friends, who had come for the premiere show from Madras, had an accident while riding in his Mercedes-Benz with both the driver and his relatives dying, which Dwarakish considered a bad omen. The film failed commercially.

== See also ==
- List of Indian superhero films
