= Prananiki Pranam =

- Theatrical release poster
- Directed by: Chalasani Rama Rao
- Written by: Paruchuri Brothers (dialogues)
- Screenplay by: V. Kramachi Rao
- Story by: Vietnam Veedu Sundaram; Datta Brothers
- Produced by: D. Vijaya Saradhi
- Starring: Nandamuri Balakrishna; Rajani
- Cinematography: V.S.R Swamy
- Edited by: Kotagiri Venkateswara Rao
- Music by: Chakravarthy
- Production company: Harish Enterprises
- Release date: 12 January 1990
- Running time: 132 mins
- Country: India
- Language: Telugu

Prananiki Pranam is a 1990 Telugu-language action film produced by D. Vijaya Saradhi under the Harish Enterprises banner, directed by Chalasani Rama Rao. It stars Nandamuri Balakrishna, Rajani and music composed by Chakravarthy.

== Plot ==
The film begins with Raja, an orphan brought up by a netherworld kingpin, Nagu Dada, who is his mentor and idol. He loathes his birth mother, who is unfamiliar to him, as she had thrown him in the dustbin soon after giving birth. Rasool is the contender of Dada, for whom Raja is the die-harder, and a jeopardy gang war continues. Justice Jayanti Devi, a woman of righteousness, arrives in the town. Once, Raja rescues her from danger when an unknown bond builds between them. Knowing it, Dada dismays because Raja is the son of Jayanti Devi. Twenty-five years ago, Giri, son of Nagu Dada, mauled his fellow collegian, and Gayatri Devi destined him to hang. To pay back, Dada abducted Raja, reared him with cupboard love, and forged his mother as vile.

In tandem, Raja crushes Lalitha, the niece of Jayanti Devi, which she opposes because Raja is the foster of Nagu Dada. Accordingly, Dada counterfeits as reformed and shuts down his nefarious activities on behalf of Raja. After a while, Bahadoor, the past acolyte of Dada, mingles with Rasool and spells ill about him. So, Raja on fire revolts and challenges to kill him. Exploiting it, Nagu Dada slays Bahadoor and incriminates Raja. In that dilemma, Raja suspects Rasool strikes on him, but getting knowledge of his virtue, the two befriend him. Later, upon Jayanti Devi's advice, Raja surrenders, but in keeping with witnesses, she penalizes him with a death sentence. Anyhow, he absconds with the help of Rasool. Then, Nagu Dada reveals the actuality to Jayanti Devi and announces to Raja that Jayanti Devi is his mother when he rebukes her. In the next step, Rasool brings out the satanic shade of Dada, the sacredness of his mother before Raja, by sacrificing his life. At last, Raja ceases Dada and pleads for pardon from his mother. Finally, the movie ends happily with Raja & Lalitha's marriage.

== Cast ==
- Nandamuri Balakrishna as Raja
- Rajani as Lalitha
- Mohan Babu as Rasool
- Satyanarayana as Nagaraju aka Nagu Dada
- Vanisri as Justice Jayanti Devi
- Anand Raj as Bahadoor
- Sridhar as Jayanti Devi's husband
- Mada as Inspector
- Maharshi Raghava as Giri
- Suthi Velu as Santanam
- Brahmanandam as Brahmanandam
- Jaya Bhaskar
- Bhimeswara Rao
- Chidatala Appa Rao as pickpocket
- Sri Lakshmi as Subbu
- Tatineni Rajeswari
- Bindu Ghosh
- Sailaja

== Production ==
Srinu Vytla started his career as assistant director with this film.

== Soundtrack ==
Prananiki Pranam

Film score by Chakravarthy
- Released: 1990
- Genre: Soundtrack
- Length: 22:48
- Label: LEO Audio
- Producer: Chakravarthy

Chakravarthy chronology
Bhale Donga (1990)	Prananiki Pranam (1990)	Aggiramudu (1990)

Music composed by Chakravarthy. Lyrics were written by Veturi. Music released on LEO Audio Company.

S. No.	Song title	Singers	length
1	"Aakasam Meeda"	S. P. Balasubrahmanyam, S. Janaki	4:22
2	"Bale Vanne Chinnele"	S. P. Balasubrahmanyam, S. Janaki	4:12
3	"Eshwar Alla Terenam"	S. P. Balasubrahmanyam, Mano	4:48
4	"Ichhadu Pada Signal"	S. P. Balasubrahmanyam, S. Janaki	4:33
5	"Su Su Subbamtto"	S. P. Balasubrahmanyam, S. Janaki	4:53

== Legacy ==
The scene where Balakrishna ties a thaali to Rajani around the jail bar, which leads him to remove the bar on his own, went viral.
