= One by Two (1993 film) =

One By Two
- DVD cover
- Directed by: Siva Nageswara Rao
- Written by: Tanikella Bharani (dialogues)
- Screenplay by: Siva Nageswara Rao
- Story by: Janardhana Maharshi
- Produced by: Tammareddy Bharadwaja
- Starring: Srikanth; J. D. Chakravarthy
- Cinematography: B. N. Rao
- Edited by: K. Ramesh
- Music by: Vidyasagar
- Release date: 10 December 1993
- Country: India
- Language: Telugu

One By Two is a 1993 Telugu-language comedy film directed by Siva Nageswara Rao. The film stars Srikanth (in his debut lead role) and J. D. Chakravarthy in prominent roles. The film was a box office success.

== Cast ==
- Srikanth as Balaji
- J. D. Chakravarthy as Babji
- Nirosha
- Uttara
- Suryakantham
- Nagesh
- Sudhakar as Abbulu
- Babu Mohan as Babloo
- Banerji
- Tanikella Bharani
- Brahmanandam
- Rallapalli
- Sri Lakshmi
- AVS
- Dharmavarapu Subramanyam
- Suthi Velu
- Y. Vijaya

== Soundtrack ==
One by Two

Film score by Vidyasagar
- Released: 1993
- Genre: Soundtrack
- Label: Geetha Audio Recording Co.
- Producer: Vidyasagar

All music is composed by Vidyasagar.

No.	Title	Lyrics	Singer(s)	Length
1.	"a.b.c.d"	Vennelakanti	Mano
2.	"Aadagaali"	Sirivennela Seetharama Sastry	Mano
3.	"Preminchaku"	Bhuvana Chandra	Mano, Saahul
4.	"Iddaroo Iddare"	Bhuvana Chandra	Mano, Minmini, Radhika
5.	"My name is"	Bhuvana Chandra	S. P. Balasubrahmanyam
