= Ninaive Oru Sangeetham =

- Theatrical release poster
- Directed by: K. Rangaraj
- Written by: Selvakumar
- Produced by: S. Greeta
- Starring: Vijayakanth; Radha; Srividya; Rekha
- Cinematography: Dinesh Baboo
- Edited by: R. B. Thilak
- Music by: Ilaiyaraaja
- Production company: V. N. S. Films
- Release date: 24 July 1987
- Running time: 142 minutes
- Country: India
- Language: Tamil

Ninaive Oru Sangeetham (transl. Memory is a melody) is a 1987 Indian Tamil-language romantic drama film, directed by K. Rangaraj and produced by S. Greeta. The film stars Vijayakanth, Radha, Srividya and Rekha. It was released on 24 July 1987. The film was remade in Telugu as Donga Pelli.

== Plot ==
Marudhu, a farmer with a big heart, lives with his elder sister Vallikannu, married to the good-for-nothing Chinnukaruppandevar, along with his niece, foster daughter, Meena. One day, Meena, accompanied by her mother, asks for an explanation to the one who deceives with his father, this one throws her off out of the house. Marudhu returns her in guaranteeing that she is from now on her partner. Chinnukaruppandevar loses all his land to the unscrupulous Bairava by playing poker. At the end of a fight with the latter, Marudhu takes advantage of this event to set the record straight to his brother-in-law. However, news of the cholera rages around. Sandhya, a doctor, who wanted to inoculate the farmers, is repulsed by Marudhu and his friends. He is taken to the police station for disorder to the public service. Sandhya returns to the village, firmly decided to continue, defying the ignorance and the inhospitality of the inhabitants. Marudhu continues putting obstacles in the way, burning the tent where she sheltered. The doctor sets to keep her cool. This is when bursts a violent thunderstorm. The remorseful Marudhu returns to look for Sandhiya to put her under cover and puts up a new tent the next day. The young woman, sensitive to all these attentions, eventually falls in love with the farmer and mutually. Marudhu learns by Gowryshankar, the sad episode, where Sandhya had to be her daughter-in-law and finally it did not come true because his son left them in the lurch at the last moment. Since the old man denied him and set Sandhya under his wing. Marudhu promises to him at this moment, when she will be his wife, to her immense happiness. But Meena surprises the lovers without their knowledge. Later, Marudhu explains to Meena and to her elder sister, the tragic past of Sandhiya and cannot thus start again, at the moment its word. Sandhya would not support a new sentimental failure. Discouraged because lover also and for a long time, from her part, Meena pretended to poison herself and asks as her last wish before dying, to be the wife of Marudhu. What realizes the farmer and discovers right after that, trickery. Trapped, he summons the assembly of the wise men of the village which decides in favour of Meena. Complaining very often of violent headaches which Meena handled with casualness, the specialists diagnose her with a brain tumor. She is condemned in the very short term. Only at the beginning, Marudhu is in the confidence, not even the concerned knows. Marudhu tries to behave "normally". He informs Sandhya who, then, does the same with the sister of Marudhu there. But in front of the misfortune which strikes them, each makes a step towards the other one. Marudhu, who did not speak anymore with her sister, becomes reconciled. Chinnukaruppandevar egotist still, metamorphoses into a good man. Marudhu fulfills all the desires of his wife Meena. At the time of giving up the ghost, he makes him understand that he likes by recognizing, by confirming that she is her wife. At the burial of Meena, Marudhu turns to Sandhya to admit that he can never love another woman so much the memory, the music of his Meena, are profoundly printed in him.

== Cast ==
- Vijayakanth as Marudhu
- Rekha as Sandhya
- Radha as Meena
- Srividya as Vallikannu
- Radha Ravi as Bairava
- Goundamani as Chinnukaruppandevar
- Senthil as Gundulingam
- Gandhimathi as Athachi
- Kovai Sarala as Gundulingam's wife
- Ravichandran as Gowrishankar (in friendly appearance)

== Soundtrack ==
The music was composed by Ilaiyaraaja. The song "Aethamayya Aetham" is set to the Carnatic raga Harikambhoji.

Song	Singers	Lyrics	Length
"Aethamayya Aetham" (Munthi Munthi)	Malaysia Vasudevan and K. S. Chithra	Ilaiyaraaja	04:27
"Eduthu Vecha" (Sad version)	S. P. Balasubrahmanyam	Gangai Amaran	04:34
"Ungalai Onnum"	Mano and chorus	Gangai Amaran	03:38
"Sandha Kadai"	Malaysia Vasudevan and K. S. Chithra	Gangai Amaran	04:33
"Pagalile Oru Nilavinai Kanden"	S. Janaki	Gangai Amaran	04:28
"Eduthu Vecha"	S. Janaki	Gangai Amaran	04:39

== Reception ==
N. Krishnaswamy of The Indian Express wrote, "Despite lacunae in the screenplay, the invigorating visual freshness keeps things going." Jayamanmadhan for Kalki praised the acting of Vijayakanth and Radha, Ilayaraja's music, Dinesh Baboo's cinematography but panned Senthil and Kovai Sarala's humour and weak screenplay.
