= Rajani (actress) =

Indian actress

- Born: Shashi Kaur Malhotra; 27 July 1965 (age 61); Bengaluru, Karnataka, India
- Other names: Rajani; Sasikala
- Years active: 1983–1993
- Spouse: Dr. Mullagiri Praveen (m. 1998)
- Children: 3

Rajani (born Shashikala Malhotra; 27 July 1965) is an Indian actress known for her work in Telugu, Tamil, Kannada, and Malayalam films. She has worked in 150 feature films including Rendu Rellu Aaru (1986), Seetharama Kalyanam (1986), Aha Naa Pellanta (1987), Majnu (1987) and Vettri Vizhaa (1989). Her Kannada films include Jai Karnataka (1989), a remake of the 1987 Hindi film Mr. India and Neenu Nakkare Haalu Sakkare (1991). She also starred in Bharathan's Malayalam hit Padheyam (1993). In Tamil films, she was credited as Sasikala.

== Personal life ==
Rajani was born in Bengaluru, Karnataka. She married Dr. Mullagiri Praveen in 1998 and they have 3 children.

== Filmography ==
=== Telugu ===
1. Brahma Mudi (1985)
2. Bharyabhartala Bandham (1985)
3. Lanchavataram (1985)
4. Idena Nyayam (1986)
5. Naga Devatha (1986)
6. Brahma Rudrulu (1986)
7. Seetarama Kalyanam (1986)
8. Manavudu Danavudu (1986)
9. Manchi Manasulu (1986)
10. Aadapadachu (1986)
11. Rendu Rella Aaru (1986)
12. Prathidwani (1986)
13. Cowboy No. 1 (1986)
14. Maruti (1986)
15. Majnu (1987)
16. Thayaramma Thandava Krishna (1987)
17. Nene Raju Nene Mantri (1987)
18. Collector Gari Abbai (1987)
19. Agni Putrudu (1987)
20. Bhale Mogudu (1987)
21. Monagadu (1987)
22. Udayam (1987)
23. Gundamma Gari Krishnulu (1987)
24. Ramu (1987)
25. Sardar Dharmanna (1987)
26. Donga Kapuram (1987)
27. Muddu Bidda (1987)
28. Chinnari Devatha (1987)
29. Hantakudi Veta (1987)
30. Nammina Bantu (1987)
31. Aha Naa Pellanta (1987)
32. Shankaravam (1987)
33. Ugranethrudu (1988)
34. Chattamto Chadarangam (1988)
35. Samsaram (1988)
36. Brahma Putrudu (1988)
37. Dorakani Donga (1988)
38. Jeevana Ganga (1988)
39. Bharya Bhartala Bagotham (1988)
40. Menamama (1988)
41. Bhama Kalapam (1988)
42. Murali Krishnudu (1988)
43. Chikkadu Dorakadu (1988)
44. Praja Theerpu (1989)
45. Gaduggai (1989)
46. Bandhuvulostunnaru Jagratha (1989)
47. Dharma Yuddham (1989)
48. Chalaki Mogudu Chadastapu Pellam (1989)
49. Dhruva Nakshatram (1989)
50. Neram Nadi Kadu (1989)
51. Prananiki Pranam (1990)
52. Rao Gari Intlo Rowdy (1990)
53. Sahasa Putrudu (1990)
54. Prajala Manishi (1990)
55. Agni Nakshatram (1991)

=== Tamil ===
1. Ilamai Kaalangal (1983) – Debut in Tamil
2. Sabaash (1984)
3. Shankari (1984)
4. Kuzhandai Yesu (1984)
5. Madras Vathiyar (1984)
6. Theerpu En Kaiyil (1984)
7. Kaval Kaithigal (1984)
8. Kuva Kuva Vaathugal (1984)
9. Anbin Mugavari (1985)
10. Naagam (1985)
11. Enaitha Kodugal (1985)
12. Navagraha Nayagi (1985)
13. Thanga Mama 3D (1985)
14. Sigappu Nila (1985)
15. Oomai Vizhigal (1986)
16. Kutravaaligal (1986)
17. Kolusu (1986)
18. Mann Soru (1986)
19. Shankar Guru (1987)
20. Vetri Vizha (1989)
21. Gnana Paravai (1990)
22. En Pottukku Sonthakkaran (1991)
23. Naane Varuven (1992)
24. Unna Nenachen Pattu Padichen (1992)
25. Oor Mariyadhai (1992)

=== Kannada ===
1. Jai Karnataka (1989)
2. Nagini (1990)
3. Neenu Nakkare Haalu Sakkare (1991)
4. Matsara (1991)
5. Entede Bhanta (1992)
6. Preethi Maado Hudugarigella (2002)

=== Malayalam ===
1. Inakkily (1984)
2. Padheyam (1993)
