= Gnana Paravai =

- Poster
- Directed by: Vietnam Veedu Sundaram
- Written by: Vietnam Veedu Sundaram
- Produced by: R. Dhanaphalan
- Starring: Sivaji Ganesan; Harish Kumar; Sasikala; Manorama
- Cinematography: A. Vincent
- Edited by: Gowtham Raj
- Music by: M. S. Viswanathan
- Production company: Yaghava Productions
- Release date: 11 January 1991
- Running time: 130 minutes
- Country: India
- Language: Tamil

Gnana Paravai (transl. Bird of Wisdom) is a 1991 Indian Tamil-language film, directed by Vietnam Veedu Sundaram. The film stars Sivaji Ganesan, Harish Kumar, Sasikala and Manorama. It was released on 11 January 1991. The film became a failure at box-office.

== Plot ==
The film is about an old man, Sivaji, who can tell the character and the future of a person by just looking in their eyes. Giri is a rich student who spends a lot of money on his friends. He falls in love with Sivaji's daughter Aruna, but Aruna rejects him and humiliates him. Giri decides to not give up. Later, Aruna and her friend Rajeswari go on a picnic with their classmates. Giri's friend Aandavar doesn't want to see Giri and Aruna together, for fear that Giri won't spend any more money on his friends. Later, Giri and Aandavar plan to humiliate Aruna. Aruna is blamed to be a nymphomaniac, to prove the contrary the innocent girl commits suicide. The hatred intensifies between Giri and Rajeswari. In the meantime, Rajeswari's brother-in-law Dinesh burns Rajeswari's sister and wants to marry Rajeswari. Finally, Sivaji and Giri come to her rescue.

== Cast ==
- Sivaji Ganesan as Sivaji
- Harish Kumar as Giri
- Sasikala as Rajeswari
- Manorama
- Rajasekar as Dinesh
- V. K. Ramasamy as Annachi
- Gandhimathi as Annachi's wife
- Rajvi as Aruna
- Charle as Kanni
- Chinni Jayanth as Sachidhanandam
- Raghuram as Aandavar
- Sudha
- Priya
- Thillai Rajan
- Haja Shareef
- Kumaran
- Sakthi Thamu
- Muthukumar
- Dr. Rajendran
- M. S. Bhaskar
- Prahasam as Lecturer Prahasam
- Master Saran as Annachi's son

== Production ==
Gnana Paravai is the first and only film where Manorama acted as Ganesan's pair, which was her long time desire. The film was produced by an entrepreneur R. Dhanapalan who revealed it was the idea of his spiritual guru Yagava Muni to produce films.

== Soundtrack ==
The music was composed by M. S. Viswanathan, with lyrics written by Vaali, Valampuri John and Kamakodiyan.

Song	Singer(s)	Duration
"Aanavam"	T. M. Soundararajan	5:03
"Chinna Chinna"	L. R. Eswari	3:34
"Kaalai Maalai"	K. J. Yesudas, K. S. Chithra	4:04
"Maakku Maakku"	S. P. Balasubrahmanyam, S. P. Sailaja	5:39
"Sollithara Nanirukke"	S. P. Balasubrahmanyam, Vani Jairam	5:06
