= Murali Krishnudu =

- Theatrical release poster
- Directed by: Kodi Ramakrishna
- Written by: Ganesh Patro (dialogues)
- Screenplay by: Kodi Ramakrishna
- Story by: Bhargav Arts Unit
- Produced by: S. Gopal Reddy
- Starring: Nagarjuna; Rajani
- Cinematography: K. S. Hari
- Edited by: K. Sathyam
- Music by: K. V. Mahadevan
- Production company: Bhargav Art Productions
- Release date: 31 May 1988
- Running time: 131 mins
- Country: India
- Language: Telugu

Murali Krishnudu is a 1988 Telugu-language drama film produced by S. Gopal Reddy under the Bhargav Art Productions banner and directed by Kodi Ramakrishna. It stars Nagarjuna and Rajani and has music composed by K. V. Mahadevan. The 1996 Kannada movie Sutradhara, starring Raghavendra Rajkumar, is loosely inspired by this movie.

== Cast ==
- Nagarjuna as Murali Krishna
- Rajani as Krishnaveni
- Mohan Babu as Parasuram
- Gollapudi Maruti Rao as Murali Krishna's grandfather
- Sowcar Janaki as Murali Krishna's grandmother
- Raavi Kondala Rao as Drama company Owner
- Gokina Rama Rao as Krishnaveni's father
- Chidatala Appa Rao
- Chitti Babu as Driver
- K. K. Sarma as Manager
- Juttu Narasimham
- Usilaimani
- Dham
- Kuyili as Item Number
- Chandrika as Parimala
- Anitha as Krishnaveni's mother
- Y. Vijaya as Kanyakumari

== Soundtrack ==
Murali Krishnudu

Film score by K. V. Mahadevan
- Released: 1988
- Genre: Soundtrack
- Length: 28:15
- Label: SAPTASWAR Audio
- Producer: K. V. Mahadevan

K. V. Mahadevan chronology
| Muvva Gopaludu (1987) | Murali Krishnudu (1988) | Janaki Ramudu (1988) |

Music composed by K. V. Mahadevan. Lyrics was written by C. Narayana Reddy and Vennelakanti. Music released on SAPTASWAR Audio Company.

| S. No. | Song title | Singers | length |
|---|---|---|---|
| 1 | "Naa Kosame Lokam" | S. P. Balasubrahmanyam | 4:16 |
| 2 | "Chakkani Chilakamma" | S. P. Balasubrahmanyam, P. Susheela | 3:51 |
| 3 | "Nee Abinaya Gathilona" | S. P. Balasubrahmanyam | 4:24 |
| 4 | "Ettago Undholamma" | S. P. Balasubrahmanyam, P. Susheela | 4:04 |
| 5 | "Olole Navvindhi" | S. P. Balasubrahmanyam, P. Susheela | 3:24 |
| 6 | "Premante Mosamani" | S. P. Balasubrahmanyam, S. Janaki | 4:10 |
| 7 | "Srimadhramaramana" (Hari Katha) | P. Susheela | 4:06 |
