= Donga Pelli =

1988 Telugu film starring Sobhan Babu

- Directed by: Ravi Raja Pinisetty
- Written by: Satyanand (Dialogues)
- Based on: Ninaive Oru Sangeetham (1987) by K. Rangaraj
- Produced by: Anam Gopalakrishna Reddy
- Starring: Sobhan Babu; Vijaya Shanti; Sumalatha
- Cinematography: Suresh
- Music by: Chakravarthy
- Production company: Sri Venkata Krishna Films
- Release date: 5 February 1988
- Country: India
- Language: Telugu

Donga Pelli (transl. Fake Marriage) is a 1988 Indian Telugu film directed by Ravi Raja Pinisetty starring Sobhan Babu, Vijaya Shanti, Sumalatha and Gollapudi Maruti Rao in the lead roles. The film produced by Anam Gopalakrishna Reddy had musical score by Chakravarthy. It was a remake of the 1987 K. Rangaraj Tamil-language film Ninaive Oru Sangeetham.

== Cast ==
- Sobhan Babu
- Vijaya Shanti
- Sumalatha
- Gollapudi Maruti Rao
- Giri Babu
- Narra Venkateswara Rao
- Suthi Velu
- Annapurna
- Y. Vijaya
- Priyanka
- Jayasheela
- Chidatala Appa Rao
- Chitti Babu
- Ganga
- Yechuri

== Soundtrack ==
Music was composed by Chakravarthy.

| S.No | Song title | Singers |
|---|---|---|
| 1 | "Chinnottu Peddottu" | S. Janaki, S. P. Balasubrahmanyam |
| 2 | "Manasevaro Adigaru" | S.P.Sailaja, S. P. Balasubrahmanyam (BALU Anna) |
| 3 | "Vennello Pakkanunte Chandamama" (F) | K. S. Chithra |
| 4 | "Prema Kannukutti Nattundamma" | S. Janaki, Chorus |
| 5 | "Vennello Pakkanunte Chandamama" (M) | S. P. Balasubrahmanyam |
