= Kuyili (actress) =

Indian film and television actress

- Occupation: Actress

Kuyili is an Indian actress and dancer who has acted and performed in multiple South Indian films. She also acted in many TV serials. She is famous for the song "Nila Athu Vaanathu Mela" in Mani Ratnam’s Nayakan (1987), in which she performed an item number, balancing on a moving boat.

== Filmography ==
Year	Film	Role	Language	Notes
1983	Thoongathey Thambi Thoongathey	Vinod's Dancer	Tamil	
1983	Poikkal Kudhirai	Uncredited role	Tamil	
1983	Soorakottai Singakutti		Tamil	
1984	Poovilangu	Saraswathi	Tamil	Debut as main lead
1985	Kalyana Agathigal	Hemalatha	Tamil	
1985	Avan	Uma	Tamil	
1986	Aayiram Pookkal Malarattum	Vinoth's wife	Tamil	
1986	December Pookal	Sarasu	Tamil	
1986	Kovil Yaanai	Anu	Tamil	
1986	Paaru Paaru Pattanam Paaru	Raja's sister	Tamil	
1986	Oru Manithan Oru Manaivi		Tamil	
1986	Sundara Swapnagalu	Sudha	Kannada	
1986	Aalorungi Arangorungi	Nisha	Malayalam	
1986	Oru Yugasandhya	Dakshayani	Malayalam	
1986	Onnu Randu Moonnu	Sindhu	Malayalam	
1987	Nayakan		Tamil	Special appearance in Nila Athu Vanathu Mela, Item song
1987	Bharatamlo Arjunudu		Telugu	Special appearance
1987	Kadhai Kadhaiyam Karanamam		Tamil	Special appearance
1987	Swathi Thirunal		Malayalam	Special appearance
1987	President Gari Abbai		Telugu	Special appearance
1987	Aha! Naa Pellanta!!		Telugu	Special appearance
1987	Jebu Donga	Stella	Telugu	Special appearance
1988	Kunguma Kodu	Geetha	Tamil	
1988	Murali Krishnudu		Telugu	Special appearance
1988	Soora Samhaaram		Tamil	Special appearance
1988	August 15 Raatri		Telugu	Special appearance
1988	Puthiya Vaanam		Tamil	Special appearance
1988	Naan Sonnathey Sattam		Tamil	
1988	Kalyana Paravaigal		Tamil	
1988	Thodallullu		Telugu	Special appearance
1988	Ramudu Bheemudu		Telugu	
1988	Brahma Puthrudu	Item Song	Telugu	
1988	Donga Ramudu	Rani	Telugu	
1988	Kaliyugam		Tamil	Special appearance
1988	Nethiyadi		Tamil	Special appearance
1989	Sattathin Thirappu Vizhaa	Ponni	Tamil	
1989	Solaikuyil	Valli	Tamil	
1989	Manandhal Mahadevan	Rasathi	Tamil	
1989	Adavilo Ardharathri		Telugu	
1989	Pudhea Paadhai	Kuyili	Tamil	Special appearance
1989	Uthama Purushan		Tamil	Special appearance
1989	Chinnappadass		Tamil	Special appearance
1989	Pudhu Pudhu Arthangal		Tamil	Special appearance
1989	Rajanadai		Tamil	Special appearance
1989	Vettaiyaadu Vilaiyaadu		Tamil	Special appearance
1989	En Thangai		Tamil	Special appearance
1989	Neerajanam		Tamil	Special appearance
1989	Gaduggayi	Mangi	Telugu	Special appearance
1989	Valathu Kalai Vaithu Vaa		Tamil	Special appearance
1989	Enga Ooru Mappillai		Tamil	Special appearance
1989	Koduku Diddina Kapuram		Telugu	Special appearance
1989	Adavilo Abhimanyudu		Telugu	Special appearance
1989	Krishna Gari Abbayi		Telugu	Special appearance
1989	Indrudu Chandrudu		Telugu	Special appearance
1989	Agnipravesham	Club dancer	Malayalam	Special appearance
1989	Antharjanam	Dancer	Malayalam	Special appearance
1990	Pulan Visaranai		Tamil	Special appearance
1990	Nalla Kaalam Porandaachu	Meena	Tamil	Special appearance
1990	Pudhiya Sarithiram		Tamil	Special appearance
1990	60 Naal 60 Nimidam		Tamil	Special appearance
1990	Niyamam Enthucheyyum		Malayalam	Special appearance
1990	Unnai Solli Kutramillai	Baby	Tamil	Special appearance
1990	Hosa Jeevana		Kannada	Special appearance
1990	Adhisaya Manithan	Lynda	Tamil	
1990	Wait a Minute		Malayalam	
1990	Anna Thammudu		Telugu	
1990	Shabdham Velicham		Malayalam	
1991	Master Plan		Malayalam	Special appearance
1991	Koumara Swapnangal		Malayalam	
1991	Teneteega		Telugu	
1991	Brahmarshi Viswamitra		Telugu	
1992	Thaali Kattiya Raasa		Tamil	Special appearance
1992	Kasu Thanga Kasu	Ponnatha	Tamil	
1994	Muthal Manaivi		Tamil	
1999	Rojavanam	Roja's aunt	Tamil	
1999	Kasalavu Nesam	Mathangi	Tamil	
2001	Thavasi	Sankarapandi's wife	Tamil	
2001	Narasimha	Narasimha's sister-in-law	Tamil	
2001	Paarthale Paravasam		Tamil	
2002	Pammal K. Sambandam		Tamil	
2002	Style	Selvi's mother	Tamil	
2003	Kalatpadai	Priya's aunt	Tamil	
2003	Kurumbu	Aparna's mother	Tamil	
2004	Engal Anna	Sundaralingam's wife	Tamil	
2004	Kuthu	Guru's mother	Tamil	
2004	Jai	Villager	Tamil	
2004	Dreams	Charu's mother	Tamil	
2004	Arul	Kanmani's and Neelaveni's mother	Tamil	
2005	Kannamma	Madan's mother	Tamil	
2005	Amudhey	Vinaya's mother	Tamil	
2005	ABCD	Chandra's Neighbour	Tamil	
2006	Prathi Gnayiru 9 Manimudhal 10.30 Varai	Kalyani's mother	Tamil	
2006	Sengathu	Chellamma	Tamil	
2006	Thirudi	Saroja	Tamil	
2007	Thiru Ranga	Ranga's mother	Tamil	
2007	Puli Varudhu	Gayathri's mother	Tamil	
2008	Arai En 305-il Kadavul	Rukmani	Tamil	
2008	Vallamai Tharayo	Nandita's mother	Tamil	
2008	Valluvan Vasuki	Thalaivar's wife	Tamil	
2008	Theeyavan	Dileep's mother	Tamil	
2009	Mariyadhai	Radha's mother	Tamil	
2009	Netru Pol Indru Illai	Reema's mother	Tamil	
2010	Kola Kolaya Mundhirika	Thirumalachari	Tamil	
2010	Gowravargal	Ganesan's mother	Tamil	
2010	Naane Ennul Illai	Aishwarya's mother	Tamil	
2011	Singam Puli	Shiva's and Ashok's mother	Tamil	
2012	Vachathi	Rama's mother	Tamil	
2012	Kadhalar Kathai	Amma	Tamil	
2014	Kaaviya Thalaivan	Ammaniyammal	Tamil	Tamil Nadu State Film Award for Best Character Artiste (Female); Norway Tamil Film Festival Award for Best Supporting Actress
2014	Mathai Kuzhappakkaranalla	Sumathi	Malayalam	
2015	Pulan Visaranai 2	Sabarathinam's mother	Tamil	

== Television ==
Year	Serial	Role	Notes
1999	Kasalavu Nesam	Mathangi	
1999-2000	Jannal: Marabu Kavithaigal	Gandhimathi	
1999	Ilakkanam Maarudho		
	Mama Vijayam		Telefilm
	Pathini Keatta Coolie	Chandra	
	Kaathirukka Oruthi		
	Ketti Melam		
	Veediyal Pudithu - Micro Thodar Macro Sinthanaigal		
2000	Jannal: Ammavukku Rendula Ragu	Kanchana	
2000-2001	Vaazhkai		
2001	Soolam		
2001-2003	Anni	Thenmozhi	Retelecast 2016
2002-2005	Annamalai	Visalam Thavasi	
2003-2007	Sorgam	Kalyani	
2003	Panneer Pushpangal		
2005-2006	Alli Raajiyam	Rajeswari	
2006-2009	Kolangal	Saradha Thiruvenkadam	Replacing Vanitha Krishnachandran
2006-2008	Kasthuri	Selvi	
2006-2008	Kana Kaanum Kaalangal	Jeeva's Mother	Season 1
2007-2009	Girija MA	Girija's mother	
2007-2010	Megala	Viswam's mother	
2008-2009	Kalasam	Saradha	
2008-2010	Thirupaavai	Rangam	
2009	Enge Brahmanan		
2009-2010	Anbe Vaa		
2010-2012	Mundhanai Mudichu	Meenakshi	
2010-2011	Yamirukka Bayamen		
2011-2012	Shanthi Nilayam	Vasanthi's mother	
2011-2016	Saravanan Meenatchi	Sharadha Rajashekar	Won, 2014: Vijay Television Awards for Special Jury Award
2012	Kanchana		
2013-2014	Thayumanavan	Mathiazhagan's elder sister	
2013-2016	Saravanan Meenatchi (season 2)	Sharadha Rajashekar	Nominated, 2014: Vijay Television Awards for Favourite Supporting Actor Female
2014-2016	Kalyanam Mudhal Kadhal Varai	Dhanam Swaminathan	Won, 2015: Vijay Television Awards for Favourite Supporting Actor Female
2018	Adukku Vittu Annasamy	Not Stated	Special Appearance
2021-2022	Ninaithale Inikkum	Eashwari	
2026–present	Vaagai Sooda Vaa	Annapoorani	
