= Master Kapuram =

- Directed by: P. N. Ramachandra Rao
- Written by: Gollapudi Maruti Rao (dialogues)
- Screenplay by: P. N. Ramachandra Rao
- Story by: Sri Gayatri Kala Chitra Unit
- Produced by: Vijay; Y. T. Naidu
- Starring: Rajendra Prasad; Gayatri
- Cinematography: Padma Kumar
- Edited by: B. Lenin; V. T. Vijayan
- Music by: Raj–Koti
- Production company: Sri Gayatri Kala Chitra
- Release date: 24 September 1990
- Running time: 137 mins
- Country: India
- Language: Telugu

Master Kapuram is a 1990 Telugu-language drama film, produced by Vijay and Y. T. Naidu under the Sri Gayathri Kala Chitra banner and directed by P. N. Ramachandra Rao. It stars Rajendra Prasad and Gayatri with music composed by Raj–Koti. The film is a remake of the Malayalam film Sasneham. The movie was predominantly shot in Horsley Hills and surrounding towns.The film won two Nandi Awards.

== Cast ==
- Rajendra Prasad as David
- Gayatri as Geeta
- Gollapudi Maruthi Rao as George
- Kota Srinivasa Rao as Paidaiah
- Suthi Velu as Simham
- Raavi Kondala Rao as Godavari Sastry
- Dr. Siva Prasad as Chengal Rao
- Badi Tataji as Kuppaiah
- Radha Kumari as Veroni
- Lakshmi Kanakala as Meenakshamma
- Chandrika as Kokila
- Prameela as Lucie
- Jaya Vijaya as David's mother
- Y. Vijaya as Rose Mary

== Soundtrack ==
Master Kapuram

Film score by K. V. Mahadevan
- Released: 1990
- Genre: Soundtrack
- Length: 13:49
- Label: LEO Audio
- Producer: Raj-Koti

K. V. Mahadevan chronology
| Papa Kosam (1990) | Master Kapuram (1990) | Magaadu (1990) |

Music composed by Raj–Koti. Lyrics were written by Veturi. Music released on LEO Audio Company.

| S.No | Song title | Singers | length |
|---|---|---|---|
| 1 | "Mallelo Manchamesuko" | Mano, Chitra | 4:33 |
| 2 | "Neeve Prema Neede Prema" | Mano, Chitra | 4:49 |
| 3 | "Rende Rendu Kulalu" | S. P. Balasubrahmanyam | 4:27 |

== Awards ==
Nandi Awards - 1990

- Best Male Comedian - Suthivelu
- Best Dialogue Writer - Gollapudi Maruti Rao
