= Brahma Puthrudu =

Brahma Putrudu
- Poster
- Directed by: Dasari Narayana Rao
- Written by: Dasari Narayana Rao (dialogues)
- Screenplay by: Dasari Narayana Rao
- Story by: V. C. Guhanathan
- Based on: Michael Raj
- Produced by: D. Ramanaidu
- Starring: Venkatesh; Rajani; Mohan Babu; Jayasudha
- Cinematography: P. S. Prakash
- Edited by: K. A. Martand
- Music by: Chakravarthy
- Production company: Suresh Productions
- Release date: 1 July 1988
- Running time: 144 minutes
- Country: India
- Language: Telugu

Brahma Putrudu is a 1988 Telugu-language film directed by Dasari Narayana Rao and produced by D. Ramanaidu under the Suresh Productions banner. It stars Venkatesh and Rajani, with music composed by Chakravarthy. The film was a remake of the Tamil film Michael Raj. The film was a super hit at the box office. Venkatesh won his first Filmfare Award for Best Actor - Telugu.

== Plot ==
Sreedevi (Shalini) is a daughter of Kiranmayi (Jayasudha), a mad woman. Everyone makes fun of Sreedevi for not knowing who her father is, and the doctor says that her mother can become normal only when she sees the person who is responsible for her pregnancy. In the process of searching for her father, Sreedevi meets Shakthi (Venkatesh), a kind-hearted gentleman who always thinks of helping others. After listening to her story, he decides to help her at any cost. Shakthi falls in the same category as Sreedevi: when Shakthi was a child, his mother was imprisoned because of trickery played by his deceitful father and he has lost her whereabouts. Ammadu (Rajani) and Shakthi both love each other. Will Shakthi succeed in finding Sreedevi's father? Will he be able to meet his mother?

== Cast ==
- Venkatesh as Shakthi
- Rajani as Ammadu
- Mohan Babu as Ranjeeth Kumar
- Jayasudha as Kiranmayi
- Nutan Prasad as Guru Murthy
- Srividya as Janaki
- Baby Shalini as Sridevi
- Allu Ramalingaiyah as Tatarao
- Suthivelu as S. I. Simham
- Nagesh as Constable Engeenayalu
- Mada as Tailor
- Ramana Reddy as Shakthi's assistant
- Potti Veeraiah as Shakthi's assistant
- Gundu Hanumantha Rao as Constable
- Jaya Prakash Reddy as S.P.
- Prabha as Rekha
- Radhakumari as Rekha's Mother
- Jayamalini as Constable Geeta
- Y. Vijaya as Sundari
- D. Ramanaidu as Dr. Naidu
- Arja Janardhana Rao as Stall Owner

== Soundtrack ==
Brahma Puthrudu

Film score by Chakravarthy
- Released: 1988
- Genre: Soundtrack
- Length: 18:51
- Label: Annapurna Music
- Producer: Chakravarthy

Chakravarthy chronology
Raktha Tilakam (1988)	Brahma Puthrudu (1988)	Manchi Donga (1988)
External audio
- Brahma Puthrudu – Jukebox on YouTube

Music composed by Chakravarthy. Lyrics written by Dasari Narayana Rao. Music released on Annapurna Music Company.

Track listing
No.	Title	Singer(s)	Length
1.	"Nee Yabba"	S. P. Balasubrahmanyam, S. Janaki	3:36
2.	"Ayyababoi"	S. P. Balasubrahmanyam, S. Janaki	3:30
3.	"Sannajaji Chettu Kindha"	S. P. Balasubrahmanyam, P. Susheela	3:58
4.	"Ammayi Mukku"	S. P. Balasubrahmanyam, S. P. Sailaja	3:57
5.	"Amma Thodu"	S. P. Balasubrahmanyam	3:50
Total length:			18:51

== Awards ==
- Baby Shalini won the Nandi Award for Best Child Actress (1988)
