= Donga Garu Swagatham =

1987 Telugu film by G. Ram Mohana Rao

- Directed by: G. Ram Mohana Rao
- Screenplay by: G. Ram Mohana Rao
- Produced by: Y. Satyanarayana
- Starring: Krishna; Vijaya Shanthi; Jaggayya
- Music by: Chakravarthi
- Production company: Subhodaya Art Productions
- Release date: 31 December 1987
- Country: India
- Language: Telugu

Donga Garu Swagatham (transl. Honourable Thief, Welcome) is a 1987 Indian Telugu-language action comedy film written and directed by G. Ram Mohana Rao starring Krishna and Vijaya Shanthi in the lead roles. It has musical score by Chakravarthi. Y. Satyanarayana produced the film for Subhodaya Art Productions.

The film was released on 31 December 1987 to positive response from viewers turning out to be a Superhit at the box office. Donga Garu Swagatham is actor Krishna's 253rd film.

== Cast ==
- Krishna as Rambabu
- Vijaya Shanthi as Lalitha
- Jaggayya as Jagadish Chandra Prasad
- Kaikala Satyanarayana as Mushti Subrahmanyam
- Annapurna as Annapurna
- Gollapudi Maruthi Rao as Sambaiah
- Giri Babu as Mushti Prahlada Rao
- Sudhakar as Bujji
- Suthi Velu as Prasad
- Y. Vijaya as Kamala
- Anuradha as Kanchuvakkala Kamini Devi
- Vallam Narasimha Rao as Dharmanna
- K. K. Sharma as Kondaiah

== Music ==
Donga Garu Swagatham

Soundtrack album by Chakravarthi
- Released: 1987
- Recorded: 1987
- Genre: Feature film soundtrack
- Language: Telugu

Chakravarthi scored and composed the film's soundtrack. Veturi Sundararama Murthy penned the lyrics.

1. Dollu Puchchakayalaga — S. Janaki, Raj Sitaram
2. Dooram Dooram — S. Janaki, Raj Sitaram
3. Uyyala Uyyala — S. Janaki, Raj Sitaram
4. Ok Chesuko — S. Janaki, Raj Sitaram
5. Naa Guttune — S. Janaki
