= Babai Abbai =

1985 film

- Theatrical release poster
- Directed by: Jandhyala
- Written by: Jandhyala
- Produced by: S. Sudhakar Reddy
- Starring: Nandamuri Balakrishna; Anitha Reddy
- Cinematography: S. Gopal Reddy
- Edited by: Gowtam Raju
- Music by: Chakravarthy
- Production company: Ushodhaya Movies
- Release date: 8 February 1985
- Running time: 122 minutes
- Country: India
- Language: Telugu

Babai Abbai (transl. Uncle Nephew) is a 1985 Indian Telugu-language comedy film written and directed by Jandhyala. The film stars Nandamuri Balakrishna and Anitha Reddy, with Suthi Veerabhadra Rao and Suthi Velu in key roles. The film features music composed by Chakravarthy.

The film's plot is inspired by the 1954 Telugu film Vaddante Dabbu, which was based on the 1902 novel Brewster's Millions by George Barr McCutcheon. Babai Abbai marks the debut of Anitha Reddy as a heroine and introduces Vizag Prasad in a supporting role. The film was released on 8 February 1985.

== Plot ==
The film follows two con artists, Balasubramanyam "Bala" and Veera, who, despite their chaotic lives, share a close bond and refer to each other as Babai (uncle) and Abbai (son). Their livelihood consists of taking debt and absconding from creditors. Bala meets and falls in love with Krishnaveni, the daughter of a wealthy businessman, Vara Prasad Rao. To test Bala's character, Vara Prasad Rao gives him ₹25 lakh, with the condition that he spends the entire amount within 30 days without donating or destroying it, and also refrains from meeting Krishnaveni during this period.

Bala embarks on this challenge under Veera's guidance, trying different methods to spend the money, including gambling, racing, making a film, and building a house. However, his efforts only increase his wealth, which eventually frustrates him. In the end, Bala discards the money into the sea, just as Vara Prasad Rao arrives to evaluate his progress. Vara Prasad Rao reveals that the task was not about spending money but about studying Bala's character and showing him the futility of wealth gained through deceit. The film concludes with Bala and Krishnaveni's marriage, bringing the story to a happy resolution.

== Cast ==
- Nandamuri Balakrishna as Abbai / Balasubramanyam "Bala"
- Anitha Reddy as Krishnaveni "Krishna"
- Suthi Veerabhadra Rao as Babai / Veerabhadra Rao
- Suthi Velu as Vara Prasad Rao
- Rajendra Prasad as Taxi Driver
- Rallapalli as Aruna's father
- Kota Srinivasa Rao
- Vizag Prasad as Inspector Syam Sundar
- Malladi as Lawyer
- Potti Prasad as Madman
- K. K. Sarma
- Chitti Babu
- Satti Babu as Manager Jabar
- Chidatala Appa Rao
- Dham
- Jeet Mohan Mitra
- Sri Lakshmi as Aruna
- Kakinada Syamala as Aruna's mother
- Radha Kumari as Subbulu
- Nirmalamma as Godaramma
- Pavala Syamala as Sundari, Godaramma's granddaughter

== Production ==
=== Development ===
Babai Abbai was inspired by the 1954 Telugu film Vaddante Dabbu, which in turn was based on the English novel Brewster's Millions (1902) by George Barr McCutcheon. The climax of the film drew comparisons to the 1963 American film It's a Mad, Mad, Mad, Mad World.

=== Casting ===
Babai Abbai marked the debut of Anitha Reddy as a heroine. Although she had signed Srivari Sobhanam (1985) earlier, also directed by Jandhyala, Babai Abbai was released first. Anitha began her career as a singer in K. J. Yesudas's troupe and ventured into films at a very young age as a singer. She had previously sung in Kirayi Rowdylu (1981) and also provided vocals for the song "O Priya" in Babai Abbai.

Suthi Velu was originally cast to play the role of Babai (uncle). However, due to prior commitments, the role was subsequently played by Suthi Veerabhadra Rao, while Velu portrayed the heroine's father.

Babai Abbai also marked the debut of Vizag Prasad, credited as "Prasada Rao (Vizag)." He played the role of Inspector Syam Sundar and was required to ride a Bullet bike as part of his character. After the first day of shooting, Prasad was involved in an accident while riding the bike, in which another person was injured. The film unit covered the medical expenses, and actor Balakrishna intervened with the police to resolve the matter. Prasad later adopted the stage name "Vizag Prasad" during the filming of Mogudu Pellalu (1985), with encouragement from Jandhyala.

=== Filming ===
Principal photography for Babai Abbai commenced on 7 September 1984, in Visakhapatnam. Most of the film was shot in and around Visakhapatnam, with a few scenes filmed in Madras, including beach sequences and a theatre scene. Most of the cast stayed at the Ocean View Hotel in Visakhapatnam during the production, where a notable scene, featuring Sutti Velu's assistant beating him, was filmed.

The production faced several challenges, including 22 accidents during filming. Balakrishna was involved in two accidents, and Anitha Reddy also encountered two mishaps. In one incident, Anitha, who lacked driving experience, accidentally hit Balakrishna with her vehicle during a scene, resulting in his hospitalisation. Another accident occurred when she collided with a vegetable cart during filming. Both incidents were incorporated into the film. Balakrishna also experienced a fall from a horse while filming the climax but escaped with minor injuries.

== Music ==
The music for Babai Abbai was composed by Chakravarthy, with lyrics written by Veturi. The song "Sommu Penchaku" featured Madhavapeddi Ramesh, who imitated his uncle Madhavapeddi Satyam’s style, earning praise from Satyam himself after hearing the track.

Song title	Singers	Length
"Telusa Neeku Telusa"	S. Janaki, S. P. Balasubrahmanyam	4:19
"Nee Roopu"	Srinivasa Murthy, S. Janaki	4:15
"O Priya"	Anitha Reddy, S. P. Balasubrahmanyam	3:53
"Sommu Penchaku"	S. P. Balasubrahmanyam, Madhavapeddi Ramesh	4:26
"Ledi Ledi"	S. P. Balasubrahmanyam, Srinivasa Murthy, S. Janaki	4:47

== Release ==
Babai Abbai was granted its censor certification on 5 February 1985, and was released on 8 February 1985. It was not commercially successful.
