= Chalaki Mogudu Chadastapu Pellam =

- Directed by: Relangi Narasimha Rao
- Written by: Diwakar Babu (story / dialogues)
- Screenplay by: Relangi Narasimha Rao
- Produced by: G. Niramala
- Starring: Rajendra Prasad; Rajani
- Cinematography: B. Koteswara Rao
- Edited by: D. Raja Gopal
- Music by: J. V. Raghavulu
- Release date: 22 May 1989
- Running time: 122 mins
- Country: India
- Language: Telugu

Chalaki Mogudu Chadastapu Pellam (transl. Charging husband, chaste wife) is a 1989 Telugu-language comedy film, produced by G. Nirmala under the Nirmala Arts banner and directed by Relangi Narasimha Rao. It stars Rajendra Prasad, Rajani and music composed by J. V. Raghavulu. The film was a hit at the box office. This movie was remade in Kannada as Golmal Radhakrishna (1990) and was also remade in Tamil as Pondatti Pondattithan (1991).

== Plot ==
The film begins with the marriage of a beautiful duet, Giri & Sita. Being an orthodox woman, Sita harries her husband Giri with her rigid mores by the goad of her eccentric grandmother Akhilandeswari. Giri is an employee in a branch office of a chit-fund company owned by Krishna. He resides in Hyderabad and leads a delightful life with his loving wife, Radha. Once Giri is conscious of his arrival for inspection, when Sita spoils an extensive line for her idiocy, Giri rebukes. Startlingly, Krishna appreciates Giri's sincerity and transfers him to the head office, bestowing him with upgradation. Giri walks on, questing for a home rental, but in vain. Whereat, he met with a hooker Sandhya on a train journey. Both advance to a hotel when the guilt of betraying Sita haunts Giri and backs. Suddenly, a hardship knocks through the Police raid. To abscond, Giri proclaims Sandhya as his wife before Inspector Ramadasu, who calls Krishna for evidence.

Consequently, it locks Giri since Krishna accommodates the two as his neighbors, and he quiets because of job security. Over the top, Sita & Akhilandeswari approach Giri, who throws him into a dichotomy. Now, he juggles between them, with various trials he undergoes to avoid suspicion. As a glimpse, Prasad, Krishna's brother-in-law & hand, is hounded by his wife Janaki with her terrific poems—additionally, Kannaiah, a laundryman, choruses if she kicks off. Over the top, Kasipati, his adjoin & colleague, who is regretful for tiny things, hugs Janaki mistakenly. From there, he tortures Prasad for an apology.

Meanwhile, Sandhya's avarice, sister Ranganayaki lands and the siblings threaten and try to loot Giri. Ranganayaki also lures Krishna when Radha is shady. Plus, Giri downlinks his doing for Krishna before Sita & Akhilandeswari and forges him as a tomcat. Fortuitously, Akhilandeswari meets Radha, who gives faux propaganda about Krishna, bearing Giri's words in mind when a rift arises and they split. Giri suddenly has to vacate the house with Sita by Akhilandeswari's fuss, and they check into a hotel room. Due to the adversity, Ramadasu reemerges therein and apprehends them. Being notified, Krishna steps to the Police Station when Giri divulges the totality. Hereupon, Sandhya & Ranganayaki sham as a courtesy and incriminate Giri. Ramadasu breaks the actuality, seizes the knaves, and acquits Giri with a warning. At last, he pleads pardon from Krishna and reunites him with Radha. Finally, the movie ends happily.

== Cast ==
- Rajendra Prasad as Giri
- Rajani as Seeta
- Nutan Prasad as Proprietor Krishna
- Allu Ramalingaiah as Inspector Ramadasu
- Raavi Kondala Rao as Manager
- Sanjeevi as Prasad
- Dr. Siva Prasad as Kannaiah
- Potti Prasad as Kaasipati
- Srilakshmi as Janaki
- Mamatha as Ranganayaki
- Chandrika as Sandhya
- Y. Vijaya as Radha
- Nirmalamma as Akhilandeswari

== Soundtrack ==
Chalaki Mogudu Chadastapu Pellam

Film score by J. V. Raghavulu
- Released: 1989
- Genre: Soundtrack
- Length: 13:59
- Label: AMC Audio Company
- Producer: J. V. Raghavulu

Music composed by J. V. Raghavulu. The music was released on AMC Audio Company.

S. No.	Song title	Lyrics	Singers	length
1	"Chalaki Mogudu Chadastapu Pellam"	Mullapudi Sastry	S. P. Balasubrahmanyam, Chitra	3:15
2	"Mudduku Veellakadu"	Mullapudi Sastry	S. P. Balasubrahmanyam, Chitra	3:30
3	"Sri Ranga Ranga"	Sirivennela Sitarama Sastry	S. P. Balasubrahmanyam, Chitra	3:46
4	"Chayi Patilaginatu"	Mullapudi Sastry	S. P. Balasubrahmanyam, Chitra	3:28
