= Bhale Mogudu =

- Movie Poster
- Directed by: Relangi Narasimha Rao
- Written by: Satyanand (dialogues)
- Screenplay by: Relangi Narasimha Rao
- Story by: Ramani
- Produced by: S. P. Venkanna Babu
- Starring: Rajendra Prasad; Rajani
- Cinematography: Sarath
- Edited by: D. Raja Gopal
- Music by: Satyam
- Production company: Maheswari Movies
- Release date: 24 September 1987
- Running time: 149 mins
- Country: India
- Language: Telugu

Bhale Mogudu (transl. Awesome Husband) is a 1987 Telugu-language drama film, produced by S.P. Venkanna Babu under the Maheswari Movies banner and directed by Relangi Narasimha Rao. It stars Rajendra Prasad and Rajani, with music composed by Satyam. This film is the debut of popular TV actress Kinnera. The film was recorded as a Super Hit at the box office.

== Cast ==
- Rajendra Prasad as Rama Krishna
- Rajani as Seeta
- Satyanarayana as Koteswara Rao
- Gollapudi Maruti Rao as Shankaram
- Subhalekha Sudhakar as Babji
- Ranganath as I.G.
- Suthi Veerabhadra Rao as Manmadha Rao
- Suthi Velu as Gopala Rao
- Rallapalli as Simhachalam
- Sakshi Ranga Rao
- Bheemiswara Rao
- Chidatala Appa Rao as Sweet Shop Owner
- Mithai Chitti
- Tata Appa Rao
- Annapurna as Parvathi
- Disco Shanti as Lilly
- Kinnera as Lakshmi
- Maya as Rangamma
- Y. Vijaya as Sundaramma

== Soundtrack ==
Bhale Mogudu
- Album cover

Film score by Satyam
- Released: 1987
- Genre: Soundtrack
- Length: 26:20
- Label: T-Series Audio
- Producer: Satyam

Satyam chronology
Alludu Kosam (1987)	Bhale Mogudu (1987)	Chandamama Rave (1987)

Soundtrack composed by Satyam was released through T-Series music label. Lyrics were written by Aatreya and Sirivennela Seetharama Sastry.

Track list
No.	Title	Lyrics	Singer(s)	Length
1.	"Champamantaaraa Dhan"	Aatreya	S. P. Balasubrahmanyam, Ramana	4:06
2.	"Aadindhe Aata"	Sirivennela Seetharama Sastry	S. Janaki & Chorus	4:54
3.	"Vayasaa Neeku Telusaa"	Sirivennela Seetharama Sastry	S. P. Balasubrahmanyam, P. Susheela	4:39
4.	"Ammaa Abbaa"	Sirivennela Seetharama Sastry	S. P. Balasubrahmanyam, S. Janaki	4:31
5.	"Ouna Urinche"	Sirivennela Seetharama Sastry	S. P. Balasubrahmanyam, P. Susheela	4:33
6.	"Aalumagala Daampathyam"	Aatreya	S. P. Balasubrahmanyam, P. Susheela	3:58
Total length:				26:41
