= Potti Prasad =

Indian actor

- Born: Kavivarapu Prasad Rao; 5 January 1929; Atapaka, Krishna district, Andhra Pradesh
- Died: 23 February 1998 (aged 69)
- Education: B.Com
- Occupations: Actor, Clerk
- Spouse: Rajyalakshmi
- Children: Jagannatha Rao

Potti Prasad (born Kavivarapu Prasada Rao; 5 January 1929 – 23 February 1998) was an Indian actor who predominantly worked in Telugu cinema. He was introduced to films by Jandhyala. His notable roles include those in Chantabbai and Sagara Sangamam. He made his screen debut with Appu Chesi Pappu Koodu in a brief role as one of the two (the other being Padmanabham) prospective bridegrooms for Girija. He was bowled over by the magnanimity of Nagi Reddi and Chakrapani when he was paid Rs.1116/- for that one scene work. He was a friend of another comedian Raja Babu. They acted in stage plays together. His last film was Brundavanam (1992).

== Career ==
Prasad was a stage actor before making his debut in films. Appu Chesi Pappu Koodu (1959) was his first film as an actor. Chakrapani offered him a role in this film after watching his performance in a stage show in Madras. He continued acting in stage shows while trying to get roles in movies.

He played the role of an editor of a weekly magazine in the comedy film Chantabbai starring Charanjeevi. This got him popularity with audience. He also played significant role in award-winning film Sagara Sangamam as a domestic help. In the film Hai Hai Nayaka, he played the role of an Avadhani who loses his mind after listening to foul words of his student. He plays a detective role in the film Babai Abbai starring Nandamuri Balakrishna. His last film was Brundavanam starring Rajendra Prasad.

== Filmography ==
Year	Film	Role	Notes
1959	Appu Chesi Pappu Koodu		
1964	Pooja Phalam	Raja	
1967	Ummadi Kutumbam		
1967	Sri Sri Sri Maryada Ramanna		
1969	Bhale Rangadu		
1969	Bangaru Panjaram		
1970	Pelli Sambandham		
1971	Adrusta Jathakudu		
1971	Mattilo Manikyam	Ramayya	
1971	Basthi Bul Bul	Edukondalu	
1972	Collector Janaki		
1972	Anta Mana Manchikey		
1972	Muhammad bin Tughluq		
1972	Kalam Marindi		
1972	Praja Nayakudu		
1972	Pandanti Kapuram		
1973	Dhanama? Daivama?		
1973	Devudamma		
1973	Andala Ramudu		
1974	Manushullo Devudu		
1974	Tulabharam	Ramanatham	
1974	Galipatalu		
1976	Bangaru Manishi		
1977	Chanakya Chandragupta		
1977	Amara Deepam		
1977	Chiranjeevi Rambabu	Lawyer Dharmarao	
1978	Lawyer Viswanath		
1978	Mugguru Muggure	Museum Guard	
1978	Mallepoovu		
1979	Dongalaku Saval		
1979	Andadu Aagadu	Punyakoti	
1979	Sri Rama Bantu	Panchayathi Member	
1980	Chandipriya		
1980	Kodalu Vastunaru Jagratha	Tabla Player	
1981	Jeevitha Ratham	Anakapalli Appalaswamy	
1981	Swargam	Chidanandam	
1981	Prema Natakam	Prasad, Kumar's colleague	
1982	Madhura Swapnam		
1982	Subhalekha		
1982	Pelleedu Pillalu		
1982	Korukunna Mogudu		
1983	Moogavani Paga	Ration Shop Owner	
1983	Dharma Poratam	Sastry	
1983	Kalyana Veena		
1983	Mantri Gari Viyyankudu		
1983	Ee Charitra Inkennallu	Prosecutor Parankusham	
1983	Nelavanka		
1983	Sagara Sangamam		
1983	Shakthi		
1983	Rendu Jella Sita	'Jyothisharatna' A.V. Rao	
1983	Adavalle Aligithe		
1984	Srivariki Premalekha		
1984	Pralaya Simham	Constable	
1984	Sundari Subbarao		
1984	Padmavyuham		
1984	Rama Rao Gopal Rao a.k.a. Rao Gopal Rao	Krishna Prasad	
1985	Babai Abbai		
1985	Kotha Pelli Koothuru		
1985	Terror	Newspaper Editor	
1985	Mayuri		
1986	Krishna Garadi	Ramadasu	
1986	Santhi Nivasam	Pellilla Perayya	
1986	Thatayya Kankanam		
1986	Karu Diddina Kapuram		
1986	Poojaku Panikiraani Puvvu		
1986	Kirayi Mogudu		
1986	Chantabbai		
1986	Rendu Rella Aaru		
1986	Manchi Manasulu	Bhaskar Rao	
1986	Sakkanodu	Priest	
1987	Chinnari Devatha	Police constable	
1987	Shrutilayalu		
1987	Raaga Leela		
1987	Lawyer Bharathi Devi		
1987	Krishna Leela		
1987	Manmadha Leela Kamaraju Gola		
1987	Ida Prapancham		
1987	Sardar Krishnama Naidu		
1987	Dabbevariki Chedu		
1988	Vivaha Bhojanambu		
1988	Chinnodu Peddodu		
1988	Premayanam		
1988	Sagatu Manishi		
1988	Veguchukka Pagatichukka		Dubbed Tamil in Edutha Sabatham Mudipen
1988	Jeevana Jyothi		
1988	Menamama	Jathakaratna Jathakalu Rao	
1988	Trinetrudu		
1988	Bharya Bhartalu	Reluctant Interviewer	
1989	Police Report	Veterinary Doctor	
1989	Adavilo Ardharathri		
1989	Gopala Rao Gari Abbayi		
1989	Sakshi		
1989	Paila Pachessu		
1989	Preminchi Choodu	Sanyasi	
1989	Bandhuvulostunnaru Jagratha		
1989	Chennapatnam Chinnollu	M.D. who fires Vasu (Rajasekhar) and Dasu (Chandramohan)	
1989	Yamapasam		
1989	Mamathala Kovela		
1989	Hai Hai Nayaka		
1989	Chalaki Mogudu Chadastapu Pellam	Kaasipati	
1990	Kondaveeti Rowdy	Doctor	
1990	Neti Siddhartha		
1990	Chevilo Puvvu		
1990	Police Bharya		
1991	Iddaru Pellala Muddula Police		
1991	Peddintalludu		
1991	Aditya 369		
1992	Brundavanam		
1993	Prema Chitram Pelli Vichitram		
1994	M. Dharmaraju M.A.		
