= Majnu (1987 film) =

- Theatrical poster
- Directed by: Dasari Narayana Rao
- Written by: Dasari Narayana Rao
- Produced by: Dasari Padma
- Starring: Nagarjuna; Rajani; Moon Moon Sen
- Cinematography: P. Sarath Babu
- Edited by: B. Krishnam Raju
- Music by: Laxmikant–Pyarelal
- Production company: Taraka Prabhu Films
- Release date: 14 January 1987
- Running time: 141 minutes
- Country: India
- Language: Telugu

Majnu is a 1987 Indian Telugu-language romantic tragedy film produced, written and directed by Dasari Narayana Rao. It stars Nagarjuna and Rajani, with music composed by Laxmikant–Pyarelal. The film released on 14 January 1987 alongside Sobhan Babu's Punnami Chandrudu, Balakrishna's Bhargava Ramudu and Krishna's Thandri Kodukula Challenge was recorded as a Blockbuster at the box office outperforming the other films. The film was remade in Tamil as Anand.

== Cast ==
- Nagarjuna as Rajesh
- Rajani as Alekhya
- Sudhakar as Kapil Dev, Alekhya's husband
- Moon Moon Sen as Shalini
- Kaikala Satyanarayana as Rajesh's father
- J. V. Somayajulu as Gopala Krishna
- Gummadi as Alekhya's grandfather
- Sowcar Janaki as Alekhya's mother
- K. R. Vijaya as Rajesh's mother
- Suthi Velu
- Rama Prabha

== Soundtrack ==
Majnu

Film score by Laxmikant–Pyarelal
- Released: 1987
- Genre: Soundtrack
- Length: 36:21
- Label: Lahari Music

The music was composed by Laxmikant–Pyarelal. Lyrics were written by Dasari Narayana Rao. Music was released on Lahari Music.

Track Listing
No.	Title	Singer(s)	Length
1.	"Nene Nene Hero"	S. P. Balasubrahmanyam	6:15
2.	"Kadhalaku Kannu Kannu Kalupu"	S. P. Balasubrahmanyam, P. Susheela	5:15
3.	"Idhi Tholi Rathri"	S. P. Balasubrahmanyam	6:34
4.	"Porabadithivo Twarabadithivo"	S. P. Balasubrahmanyam	5:54
5.	"I Love U"	S. P. Balasubrahmanyam, P. Susheela	6:36
6.	"Galidebba Thattukona"	S. P. Balasubrahmanyam, P. Susheela	5:47
Total length:			36:21
