= Ajeyudu =

1987 film

- Theatrical release poster
- Directed by: G. Ram Mohan Rao
- Written by: Satyanand (dialogues)
- Screenplay by: G. Ram Mohan Rao
- Story by: Bhishetty
- Produced by: S. Venkataratnam
- Starring: Venkatesh; Shobana
- Cinematography: S. Venkataratnam
- Edited by: D. Venkataratnam
- Music by: Chakravarthy
- Production company: Sri Pallavi Films
- Release date: 8 May 1987
- Running time: 127 minutes
- Country: India
- Language: Telugu

Ajeyudu is a 1987 Indian Telugu-language film, directed by G. Ram Mohan Rao and produced by S. Venkataratnam. It stars Venkatesh and Shobana, with music composed by Chakravarthy. The film was Average at the box office.

== Plot ==
Murali, a student, has completed his MA LLB and he is in love with a girl, Rekha. Murali has a happy family, his father, Dhanunjaya Rao, is a multimillionaire and his mother, Tulasi, is a kindhearted woman. Rekha is a daughter of Justice Jaganatham; everyone agrees for their marriage. One time, Murali saves a girl Padma from a few rowdies and meets her blind mother Parvathi, after few days he discovers that they are his mother and sister.

Actually, 20 years back, his father Sivaram is a taxi driver, once a few gangsters hire his taxi and rob Jaganatham's house when he was a lawyer and kills his wife, for that, Jaganatham sends him to jail and in an accident Parvathi loses her eyesight, Murali is separated from them and adopted by Dhanunjaya Rao and wife. Meanwhile, Murali brings his mother and sister to their house, on the engagement of Murali and Rekha, Jagannatham recognizes Parvathi and cancels the match, Murali challenges Jaganatham that he will prove that his father Sivaram is innocent.

Murali learns that his father Sivaram escaped from jail, became a dacoit and lurks in a forest. He meets him and has him surrender to Police, takes up his case as defence counsel and he is in search of the original criminals. During the process, a shocking incident; the real culprit is none other than his adopted father Dhanunjaya Rao. Now Murali is in the stage of dichotomy whom to sacrifice, he says everything to his adopted mother Tulasi, she inspires Murali to protect justice by punishing her husband. Meanwhile, Dhanunjaya Rao kidnaps Parvarthi and Padma, Murali saves them, sees the end of Dhanunjaya Rao and protects justice.

== Cast ==
- Venkatesh as Murali
- Shobana as Rekha
- Satyanarayana as Dhanunjaya Rao
- Sarada as Tulasi
- Jaggaiyah as Siva Ram
- Gummadi as Justice Jaganatham
- Subhalekha Sudhakar as Vishnu Chakram
- Suthi Veerabhadra Rao as Bhadram
- Suthivelu as Mukundam
- Chitti Babu
- Narra Venkateswara Rao
- Raja as Inspector Ramu
- Saradhi
- Annapurna as Parvathi
- Vara Lakshmi as Padma

== Soundtrack ==
Ajeyudu

Film score by Chakravarthy
- Released: 1987
- Genre: Soundtrack
- Length: 21:23
- Label: Lahari Music
- Producer: Chakravarthy

Chakravarthy chronology
Collector Gari Abbai (1987)	Ajeyudu (1987)	Bharatamlo Arjunudu (1987)

Music composed by Chakravarthy. Lyrics written by Veturi. Music released on Lahari Music.

S. No.	Song title	Singers	length
1	"OK Prema OK Pelli OK"	S. P. Balasubrahmanyam, S. Janaki	4:18
2	"Chalikalam Vachindhante"	S. P. Balasubrahmanyam, S. Janaki	4:43
3	"Muthyala Muddekkade"	S. P. Balasubrahmanyam, S. Janaki	4:14
4	"Thandhanalo Prema"	S. P. Balasubrahmanyam, P. Susheela	4:03
5	"Nee Jeevitha"	S. P. Balasubrahmanyam	4:05
