= Thandri Kodukula Challenge =

1987 Telugu film by M. Mallikarjuna Rao

- Directed by: M. Mallikarjuna Rao
- Written by: Paruchuri Brothers
- Based on: Needhikkuppin Paasam (1963 Tamil Film)
- Produced by: M. V. Rama Rao; A. Ramdas
- Starring: Krishna; Radha; Sumalatha; Kaikala Satyanarayana
- Cinematography: P. S. Prakash
- Edited by: Kotagiri Gopala Rao
- Music by: Chakravarthy
- Production company: Vijaya Padmalaya Pictures
- Release date: 14 January 1987
- Country: India
- Language: Telugu

Thandri Kodukula Challenge is an Indian Telugu film released on 14 January 1987 starring Krishna, Radha, Sumalatha and Kaikala Satyanarayana in the main roles with a musical score by K. Chakravarthy. The film directed by M. Mallikarjuna Rao was produced by M. V. Rama Rao and A. Ramdas for Vijaya Padmalaya Pictures.

With its release coinciding with the Sankranti festival, the film turned out to be a superhit at the box office despite facing competition from other releases — Majnu, Bhargava Ramudu and Punnami Chandrudu. The film is a remake of the Tamil film Needhikkuppin Paasam.

== Synopsis ==
Adv. Raja, the younger son of S. P. Chakradhara Rao and Dr. Saraswati Devi, happens to save Shankarayya from the goons of a wicked Veera Swamy and later defends him in the court when he is wrongly framed for attempting to murder Veera Swamy, thereby facing his own brother, Ramu, in the court and eventually emerging victorious. He later falls in love with Gowri, Shankarayya's daughter, much to his mother's chagrin as he was expected to marry Kalyani. She even threatens Gowri to back off. Meanwhile, Gowri's cousin Narahari, an ex-military officer, who has an insatiable lust for her is enraged upon knowing her relation with Raja. With the help of Veera Swamy he murders Shankarayya and manages to put the blame on Saraswati Devi. Chakradhara Rao who witnesses his wife removing the murder weapon from Shankarayya's body while trying to save him misinterprets her intentions and arrests her. An enraged and embarrassed Raja now takes it upon himself to prove his mother's innocence forcing him to have a face off with his own brother, Ramu, once again since he happens to be the public prosecutor. With the help of a CBI officer who was masquerading as a blind man he not only brings the real culprits — Narahari and Veera Swamy to justice but also helps his father in proving that these two knaves are responsible for the illegal manufacture of local bombs. He reunites his family and marries Gowri with his mother's consent.

== Cast ==
- Krishna as Adv. Raja
- Radha as Gowri
- Sumalatha as Kalyani
- Kaikala Satyanarayana as S. P. Chakradhara Rao
- Jayanthi as Dr. Saraswati Devi
- Tiger Prabhakar as Narahari
- Ranganath as Adv. Ramu
- Gollapudi Maruthi Rao as Shankarayya
- Chalapathi Rao as Veera Swamy
- Deepa as Janaki

== Songs ==
1. "Appa Amma" -
2. "Yekku Yekku" -
3. "Oyy Labakh" -
4. "Oohala Banthi" -
5. "Magha Masamochchana" -
6. "Aattinum" -
