= Manmadha Leela Kamaraju Gola =

- Theatrical release poster
- Directed by: Relangi Narasimha Rao
- Written by: Diwakar Babu (dialogues)
- Screenplay by: Relangi Narasimha Rao; Diwakar Babu
- Story by: Relangi Narasimha Rao; Diwakar Babu
- Produced by: M. Satyanarayana Prasad; Y. Rama Koteswara Rao
- Starring: Rajendra Prasad; Chandra Mohan; Kalpana
- Cinematography: B. Koteswara Rao
- Edited by: Murali-Ramaiah
- Music by: Vasu Rao
- Production company: Ram Gopal Art Movies
- Release date: 21 August 1987
- Running time: 122 mins
- Country: India
- Language: Telugu

Manmadha Leela Kamaraju Gola (transl. Cupid's Magic Kamaraju's ruckus) is a 1987 Telugu-language fantasy comedy film, produced by M. Satyanarayana Prasad, Y. Rama Koteswara Rao under the Ram Gopal Art Movies banner and directed by Relangi Narasimha Rao. It stars Rajendra Prasad, Chandra Mohan, Kalpana, and music composed by Vasu Rao.

== Cast ==
- Rajendra Prasad as Kamaraju
- Chandra Mohan as Manmadha the Cupid
- Kalpana as Kalpana
- Suthi Veerabhadra Rao as Pandala Paramasivam
- Suthi Velu as Sandeham
- Nutan Prasad as Kondala Rao
- Subhalekha Sudhakar as Anji Babu
- Potti Prasad as Doctor
- Srilakshmi as Kondala Rao's daughter
- P. R. Varalakshmi as Kondala Rao's wife
- Y. Vijaya as Srungaram Singaram
- Nirmalamma as Kamaraju's grandmother

== Soundtrack ==
Manmadha Leela Kamaraju Gola

Film score by Vasu Rao
- Released: 1987
- Genre: Soundtrack
- Length: 19:38
- Label: LEO Audio
- Producer: Vasu Rao

Music composed by Vasu Rao. Lyrics were written by Acharya Aatreya. It was released on LEO Audio Company.

S. No.	Song title	Singers	length
1	"Manmadha Leela Kamaraju Gola"	S. P. Balasubrahmanyam	2:50
2	"Chukkallo Vunnadi"	S. P. Balasubrahmanyam	3:59
3	"Adupuleni Tapam"	S. P. Balasubrahmanyam, P. Susheela	4:11
4	"Nannu Cheera Chesuko"	Mano, P. Susheela	4:29
5	"Innalluga Ee Dahamu"	S. P. Balasubrahmanyam, P. Susheela	4:09
