= Ramu (1987 film) =

- Theatrical release poster
- Directed by: Y. Nageswara Rao
- Written by: Jandhyala(dialogues)
- Screenplay by: Y. Nageswara Rao
- Story by: V. C. Guhanathan
- Based on: Per Sollum Pillai (Tamil)
- Produced by: D. Ramanaidu
- Starring: Nandamuri Balakrishna; Rajani
- Cinematography: S. Gopal Reddy
- Edited by: K. A. Marthand
- Music by: S. P. Balasubrahmanyam
- Production company: Suresh Productions
- Release date: 31 July 1987
- Running time: 133 minutes
- Country: India
- Language: Telugu

Ramu is a 1987 Indian Telugu-language drama film, produced by D. Ramanaidu under the Suresh Productions banner and directed by Y. Nageswara Rao. It stars Nandamuri Balakrishna and Rajani, with music composed by S. P. Balasubrahmanyam. It is a remake of the Tamil film Per Sollum Pillai.

== Cast ==
- Nandamuri Balakrishna as Ramu
- Rajani as Seeta
- Satyanarayana as Bhupathi
- Sharada as Gayatri Devi
- Jaggayya as Lawyer Raghava Rao
- Sudhakar as Gopalam
- Chalapathi Rao as Umapathi
- Balaji as Pradeep
- Hari Prasad as Satish
- Bhaskar as Ramesh
- Suthi Velu as Amarasilpi Suthi Velu Swamy
- P. L. Narayana
- Babu Mohan
- K. K. Sarma
- Chidatala Appa Rao as Gudla Seenaiah
- Dham
- Gowtham Raju as Bus Conductor
- Deepa as Girja
- Malashri as Jalaja
- Jaya Malini as Guydela Gowramma
- Anuradha as Naadi Nurasamma
- Rama Prabha as Bodi Ramamma
- Sri Lakshmi
- Krishnaveni as Kothimera Kondamma
- Mamatha as Pidakala Peramma
- Anitha as Lakshmi
- Master Rajesh as Dumbu

== Soundtrack ==
Music composed by S. P. Balasubrahmanyam. Lyrics were written by Veturi.

Song title	Singers	length
"Anuragala"	S. P. Balasubrahmanyam	5:19
"Vaanemi Chestundi"	S. P. Balasubrahmanyam, S. Janaki	4:49
"Kaani Kaani Mundu"	S. P. Balasubrahmanyam, P. Susheela	4:40
"Onti Ghanta Kottu"	S. P. Balasubrahmanyam, P. Susheela	4:41
"Dandalamma Dandalamma"	S. P. Balasubrahmanyam, Ramana	5:06
