= Agni Putrudu =

1987 film

- Poster
- Directed by: K. Raghavendra Rao
- Screenplay by: K. Raghavendra Rao
- Story by: Paruchuri brothers
- Produced by: Venkat Akkineni
- Starring: Akkineni Nageswara Rao; Nagarjuna; Sarada; Rajani; Sivaji Ganesan
- Cinematography: K. S. Prakash
- Edited by: Kotagiri Venkateswara Rao
- Music by: K. Chakravarthy
- Production company: Annapurna Studios
- Release date: 14 August 1987
- Running time: 133 minutes
- Country: India
- Language: Telugu

Agni Putrudu (transl. Son of Fire) is a 1987 Indian Telugu-language action film, produced by Venkat Akkineni under the Annapurna Studios banner and directed by K. Raghavendra Rao. It stars Akkineni Nageswara Rao, Nagarjuna, Sarada, Rajani and Sivaji Ganesan, with music composed by Chakravarthy.

== Cast ==
- Akkineni Nageswara Rao as Hari Hara Bharadwaja
- Nagarjuna as Kaalidasu
- Rajani as Usha
- Sarada as Brahmaramba
- Sivaji Ganesan as Chaitanya
- Satyanarayana as Bhupathi Rayudu
- Nutan Prasad as Govardhanam
- Gollapudi Maruti Rao as Deeshithulu
- Rallapalli as Narahari
- Suthi Velu as Anantham
- P. L. Narayana as Srisilam
- Chalapathi Rao as Inspector Sampath Kumar
- Bhimeswara Rao as Judge
- Balaji as Ganapathi
- Vidya Sagar as Bharadwaja's son-in-law
- Chitti Babu as Ganapathi's henchmen
- Mucharlla Aruna as Manga
- Jyothi as Gayatri
- Rajitha as Jahnavi
- Krishnaveni as Nurse
- Chandrika as Sakkubai's Sister
- Dubbing Janaki as Govardhanam's wife
- Tatineni Rajeswari as Deeshithulu's wife
- Y. Vijaya as Sakkubai

== Soundtrack ==
The music was composed by Chakravarthy. Lyrics were written by Veturi.

Song title	Singers	length
"Cheerelu Vidichina"	S. P. Balasubrahmanyam, P. Susheela	6:04
"Yerra Yerrani Bugga"	Mano, S. Janaki	6:00
"Jayaya Jaya Bhadraya"	S. P. Balasubrahmanyam	3:13
"Kamalam Kamalam"	S. P. Balasubrahmanyam, S. Janaki	4:09
"Mudduko Muddettu"	S. P. Balasubrahmanyam, P. Susheela	5:06
"Hrudaya Dhamarukam"	S. P. Balasubrahmanyam, P. Susheela	4:57
