= Muddu Bidda (1987 film) =

1987 Telugu drama film by P. Chandrasekhara Reddy

- Directed by: P. Chandrasekhara Reddy
- Produced by: Ch. Papa Rao; P. Satyanarayana
- Starring: Krishna Ghattamaneni; Rajani
- Music by: K. V. Mahadevan
- Production company: Balaji Films
- Release date: 4 December 1987
- Country: India
- Language: Telugu

Muddu Bidda (transl. Beloved son) is a 1987 Indian Telugu-language drama film directed by P. Chandrasekhara Reddy starring Krishna and Rajani in the lead roles. The film was jointly produced by P. Satyanarayana and Ch. Papa Rao for Balaji Films. The film was released on 4 December 1987.

== Cast ==
- Krishna Ghattamaneni
- Rajani
- Kaikala Satyanarayana
- Gummadi
- Kota Srinivasa Rao
- Sowcar Janaki
- Suttivelu
- Jayamalini

== Soundtrack ==
- "Anigindha Anigindha" -
- "Muddulanni" -
- "Chitti Potti Maattalo" -
- "Adbutha Vigraha" -
- "Goppinti Chinnadaniro" -
- "Amma Nannenduko" -
