= Suthi Velu =

Indian actor, comedian (1947–2012)

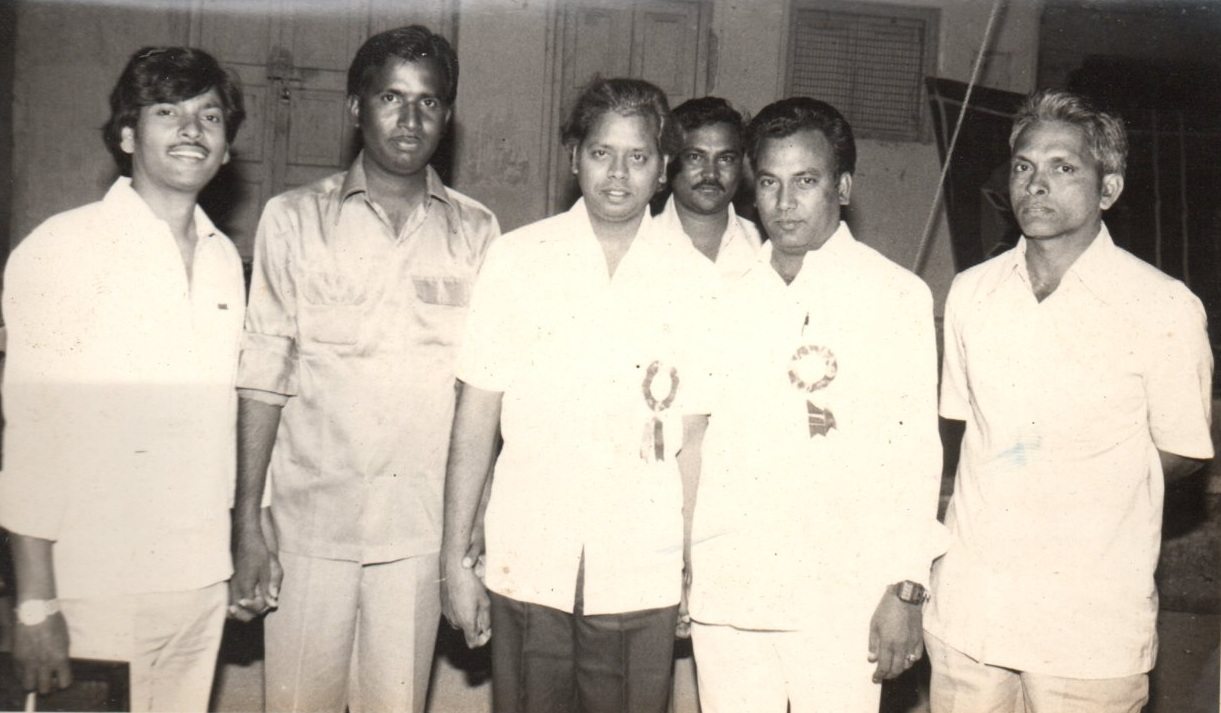
- Born: Kurumaddali Lakshmi Narasimha Rao; 7 August 1947; Bhogireddypalli, Krishna district, British India (present-day Andhra Pradesh, India)
- Died: 16 September 2012 (aged 65); Chennai, Tamil Nadu, India
- Occupations: Actor; comedian
- Years active: 1980–2012
- Spouse: Lakshmi Rajyam

Kurumaddali Lakshmi Narasimha Rao (7 August 1947 – 16 September 2012), better known by his stage name Suthi Velu, was an Indian actor and comedian known for his works in Telugu cinema. He has acted in more than 200 films, and won four state Nandi Awards.

== Early life ==
Suthi Velu's father was a teacher. From an early age he was interested in drama and also developed an interest in acting. He then decided to take up acting seriously. At the age of 7, he had given a stage performance in his town. His father discouraged him and asked him not to show interest in acting. He started his film career with Mudda Mandaram (1981), and acted in many of Jandhyala's films, which made him famous.

== Career ==
Suthivelu's comedy spanned from 1980 to 2000 in Tollywood. He is famous for timing his dialogues and expressions, particularly in director Jandhyala's comedy films. His collaboration with Suthi Veerabhadra Rao is very popular and the duo was nicknamed Suthi Janta. During his childhood, he was very lean, so one of his neighbours Jaanakamba used to call him Velu (meaning finger in Telugu). His name in the film Nalugu Stambhalata (1982) is Gurnadham. After the success of Nalugu Stambhalata, people started calling him Suthi Velu. He also acted in comedy serials such as Anandobrahma on Doordarshan and Lady Detective on ETV.

== Personal life ==
Suthi Velu was married to Lakshmi Rajyam, and have four children, three girls and a boy. He died of cardiac arrest at his residence on 16 September 2012.

== Awards ==
Nandi Awards

- Best Supporting Actor – Vande Mataram (1985)
- Best Male Comedian – Devalayam (1985)
- Best Male Comedian – Geethanjali (1989)
- Best Male Comedian – Master Kapuram (1990)

== Filmography ==
List of film credits
Year	Title	Role	Notes
1980	Bhola Shankarudu		
1981	Mudda Mandaram	Receptionist	
1981	Babulugaadi Debba		
1982	Naa Desam		
1982	Nalugu Stambhalata	Gumasta	
1982	Trisoolam		
1983	Khaidi	Beggar	
1983	Lanke Bindelu	Danaiah	
1983	Palletoori Monagadu		
1983	Durga Devi	Lakshmipathi	
1983	Adavallu Aligithe		
1983	Raju Rani Jackie	Kodandam	
1983	Amarajeevi		
1983	Puttadi Bomma		
1983	Rendu Jella Sita	Anasooya's husband	
1984	Mahanagaramlo Mayagadu		
1984	Ravoo Gopala Ravoo	Mental patient	
1984	Mukkopi		
1984	Srimathi Kavali		
1984	Anandabhairavi		
1984	Daku		
1984	Rustum		
1984	Ooha Sundari		
1984	Goonda		
1984	Srivariki Premalekha	Ananda Rao	
1984	Agni Gundam		
1985	Pratighatana	Police Constable	
1985	Manchi Manasulu		
1985	Maha Manishi		
1985	Bangaru Chilaka	Subbulu	
1985	Aadapille Nayam		
1985	Musugu Donga	Babji	
1985	Dongallo Dora		
1985	Mayadari Maridi		
1985	Surya Chandra		
1985	Maharaju		
1985	Lady James Bond		
1985	Deshamlo Dongalu Paddaru		
1985	Chiranjeevi	Chitti	
1985	Mogudu Pellalu		
1985	Vande Mataram		
1985	Raktha Sindhuram	Damodar Rao's Secretary	
1985	Devalayam		
1985	Babai Abbai	Vara Prasad Rao	
1986	Chantabbai	Ganapati	
1986	Apoorva Sahodarulu		
1986	Maruthi		
1986	Dhairyavanthudu		
1986	Pavitra		
1986	Chadastapu Mogudu		
1986	Nippulanti Manishi		
1986	Sravana Sandhya		
1986	Brahmastram		
1986	Aruna Kiranam		
1986	Manavudu Danavudu		
1986	Jailu Pakshi		
1986	Vetagallu	Narasimham	
1986	Aadi Dampatulu		
1986	Vijrumbhana	Shekhar	
1986	Karu Diddina Kapuram		
1986	Repati Pourulu	(Vandemataram)	
1986	Prathibhavanthudu		
1986	Rendu Rella Aaru		
1986	Chanakya Sapatham	Yugandhar	
1987	Muddu Bidda		
1987	Chakravarthy	Simhachalam	
1987	Donga Mogudu		
1987	Gundamma Gari Krishnulu		
1987	Bhale Mogudu		
1987	Dharmapatni		
1987	Paga Sadistha		
1987	Donga Garu Swagatham		
1987	Agni Putrudu		
1987	Ramu		
1987	Collector Gari Abbai		
1987	Raga Leela		
1987	Ajeyudu		
1987	Dayamayudu		
1987	Rowdy Police		
1987	Muddayi	Vadivelu	
1987	Kaboye Alludu		
1987	Ida Prapancham		
1987	Majnu		
1987	Dabbevariki Chedu		
1987	Padamati Sandhya Ragam		
1987	Srinivasa Kalyanam		
1987	Jebu Donga		
1987	Maa Voori Magadu	Simhachalam	
1987	Bhargava Ramudu		
1987	Manmadha Leela Kamaraju Gola	Sandeham	
1987	Manavadostunnadu		
1988	Janaki Ramudu		
1988	Yamudiki Mogudu	Vichitragupta	
1988	Annapurnamma Gari Alludu		
1988	Sagatu Manishi		
1988	Nyaniki Siksha	Chidambaram	
1988	Chikkadu Dorakadu		
1988	Bhama Kalapam		
1988	Choopulu Kalisina Shubhavela	Cameo as a Koya Dora	
1988	Jeevana Ganga		
1988	Rao Gari Illu		
1988	Nava Bharatham		
1988	Chinni Krishnudu		
1988	Jhansi Rani		
1988	Brahma Putrudu		
1988	Maa Inti Maharaju		
1988	Prema Kireetam		
1988	Station Master		
1988	Raktabhishekam		
1988	Yuddha Bhoomi		
1988	Manchi Donga		
1988	Sahasam Cheyara Dimbhaka		
1988	Menamama	Shiromani	
1988	Aakhari Poratam		
1988	Thodallullu		
1988	O Bharya Katha	Manikyam	
1988	Khaidi No.786		
1988	Maranamrudangam		
1988	Chinababu		
1988	Donga Pelli		
1989	Jayammu Nischayammu Raa	Jagannadham	
1989	Parthudu		
1989	Ajatha Satruvu	Ananda Rao	
1989	Bharatha Nari		
1989	Athaku Yamudu Ammayiki Mogudu		
1989	Bhooporatam		
1989	Vintha Dongalu	Anjaneyulu	
1989	Gopala Rao Gari Abbayi		
1989	Mouna Poratam		
1989	Vijay		
1989	Two Town Rowdy		
1989	Joo Lakataka		
1989	Geethanjali		
1989	Banduvulostunnaru Jagratha	Kistayya	
1989	Chinnari Sneham		
1989	Swathi Chinukulu		
1989	Bamma Maata Bangaru Baata		
1989	Hai Hai Nayaka	School Principal, Sarabhalingam Master	
1990	Aayudham		
1990	Neti Charitra	Zoology Lecturer, Brahmachari	
1990	Chevilo Puvvu		
1990	Irugillu Porugillu		
1990	Prema Zindabad		
1990	Mama Alludu		
1990	Master Kapuram		
1990	Rambha Rambabu		
1990	Padmavathi Kalyanam		
1990	Jayasimha	Kumbakonam Iyer	
1990	Prananiki Pranam	Santanam	
1991	Stuvartpuram Dongalu	Padmini's father	
1991	Aditya 369	Police Constable	
1991	Chaitanya		
1991	Kalikaalam		
1991	Prema Entha Madhuram		
1991	Kulamma Gunamma		
1991	Viyyala Vari Vindhu		
1991	Jeevana Chadarangam		
1991	Vichitra Prema		
1991	Sarpayagam		
1991	Bhargav		
1991	Brahmarshi Viswamitra	Nakshatraka	
1991	Srivari Chindulu		
1991	Edurinti Mogudu Pakkinti Pellam	Subbayya Lingam	
1991	Iddaru Pellala Muddula Police	Kantamma's Husband	
1992	Samsarala Mechanic	Ramanadham	
1992	Babai Hotel		
1992	Sukravaram Mahalakshmi		
1992	Samarpana		
1992	Aapadbandhavudu		
1992	Parvathalu Panakalu		
1992	Repati Koduku		
1992	Prema Drohi		
1992	Chillara Mogudu Allari Koduku	Lawyer	
1992	Appula Appa Rao	Ammaji's Husband	
1992	Killer		
1993	Ladies Special		
1993	Prema Pusthakam		
1993	Chirunavvula Varamistava		
1993	Pelli Gola		
1993	Asale Pellaina Vaani		
1993	Chittemma Mogudu		
1993	Donga Alludu		
1993	Vintha Kodallu		
1993	Kalachakram		
1993	Allari Priyudu		
1993	One By Two		
1993	Enti Bava Marinu	Nakkalagudu Naga Bhupati	
1994	Kurradhi Kurradu	Babu Rao	
1994	Muddula Priyudu		
1994	Ammayi Kapuram		
1994	Raithu Bharatam		
1994	Sundara Vadana Subbulakshmi Moguda		
1994	Nannagaru		
1994	Anna		
1995	Lingababu Love Story		
1995	Badili		
1995	Aadaalla Majaka		
1995	Leader		
1995	Mayabazaar		
1995	Ooriki Monagadu		
1995	Ketu Duplicate		
1996	Pavithra Bandham		
1996	Anaganaga Oka Roju		
1996	Oho Naa Pellanta		
1996	Topi Raja Sweety Roja		
1996	Sahasa Veerudu Sagara Kanya		
1996	Pelli Sandadi		
1996	Shri Krishnarjuna Vijayam		
1997	Rowdy Durbar	Sivayya	
1997	Mama Bagunnava		
1997	Pelli Chesukundam		
1997	Ilallu		
1997	Osey Ramulamma		
1997	Muddula Mogudu		
1997	Annamayya		
1997	Chinnabbayi		
1997	W/o V. Vara Prasad		
1998	Allari Pellam		
1998	Suryudu		
1998	Eshwar Alla		
1998	Subbaraju Gari Kutumbam		
1998	Cheekati Suryulu		
1998	Pavitra Prema		
1999	Maanikyam		
1999	Krishna Babu		
1999	Vichitram	Peraiah	
1999	Aavide Syamala		
2000	Manasichanu		
2000	Adavi Chukka		
2001	Deevinchandi		
2001	Narahari		
2002	Vachina Vaadu Suryudu		
2002	Kondaveeti Simhasanam		
2003	Kabir Das		
2004	Aa Naluguru		
2004	Xtra		
2005	Modati Cinema		
2005	Slokam		
2005	Mutta Kireedam		
2006	Veerabhadra		
2007	Andariki Vandanalu		
2007	Shridi		
2007	Allare Allari		
2007	Bangaru Kanda		
2007	Maharadhi		
2008	One		
2008	Indrajith		
2008	Krishnarjuna		
2009	Sasirekha Parinayam		
2009	Boni		
2010	Maa Aayana Bangaram		
2011	Lokame Kathaga		
2011	Kireetam		
2012	All the Best		
2012	Gowri Kalyana Vaibhogame		
2013	Mahankali		
2013	Jagadguru Adi Shankara		
2013	Sukumarudu		
2013	Ramachari	Ganapathi	Released posthumously
