= Y. Vijaya =

Indian actress and classical dancer

- Born: Kurnool, Andhra Pradesh, India
- Occupations: Actress; dancer
- Years active: 1965–present
- Spouse: Amalanathan (m. 1985)
- Children: 1

Yenigandla Vijaya is an Indian actress and classical dancer. She has appeared in more than 1000 films in Telugu, Tamil, Malayalam and Kannada languages.

== Film career ==
Y. Vijaya, a celebrated Indian actress, is renowned for her remarkable contributions to the Telugu and Tamil film industries.She embarked on her acting career at a young age and went on to become a prominent figure in South Indian cinema. She displayed a passion for the performing arts from an early age, which led her to the world of cinema.

She used to learn dance under Vempati China Satyam in Madras. Once, the producers of the film Nindu Hrudayalu visited their dance institute and roped her in for a beggar character who also knows dance. That was her first opportunity in films.

She effortlessly transitioned between various genres, including drama, romance, and family-oriented films. Vijaya gained significant popularity in the Telugu film industry, where she became a sought-after actress. While her Telugu film career was flourishing, Vijaya also enjoyed immense success in Tamil cinema.

== Personal life ==
Vijaya married Amalanathan on 27 January 1985. He used to work as a correspondent in a college. After retiring, he entered into business. Vijaya lives in Mahalingapuram, Chennai with her family. She has a daughter Anushya who got married in 2013.

== Filmography ==
=== Telugu ===
- Nindu Hrudayalu (1969)
- Thalli Thandrulu (1970)
- Sri Krishna Satya (1971)
- Vichitra Bandham (1972)
- Sri Krishnanjaneya Yuddham (1973)
- Dabbuki Lokam Dasoham (1973)
- Ganga Manga (1973)
- Number One (1973)
- Chairman Chalamayya (1974)
- Mangammagari Manavadu (1984)
- Pralaya Simham (1984) as Sheela
- Bangaru Kapuram (1984) as Sundari
- Mayuri (1985)
- Anveshana (1985)
- Vijetha (1985)
- Preminchu Pelladu (1985)
- Aalaapana (1985)
- Maa Pallelo Gopaludu (1985)
- Pratighatana (1985)
- Naga Devatha (1986)
- Repati Pourulu (1986)
- Magadheerudu (1986)
- Poojaku Panikiraani Puvvu (1986)
- Ladies Tailor (1986)
- Vetagallu (1986) as Rajeshwari Devi
- Swati Mutyam (1986)
- Vivaha Bandham (1986)
- Mama Kodallu Saval (1986)
- Chadastapu Mogudu (1986)
- Mannemlo Monagadu (1986)
- Muddula Krishnayya (1986)
- Kaliyuga Pandavulu (1986)
- Chanakya Shapatham (1986) as Sasi's sister-in-law
- Agni Putrudu (1987)
- Allari Krishnaiah (1987)
- Manavadostunnadu (1987)
- Gouthami (1987)
- Punnami Chandruudu (1987)
- Sankeertana (1987)
- Thene Manasulu (1987) as Sarojini Devi
- Bhale Mogudu (1987)
- Makutamleni Maharaju (1987)
- Sri Kanaka Mahalakshmi Recording Dance Troupe (1987)
- Nalla Trachu (1987)
- Ummadi Mogudu (1987)
- Krishna Leela (1987)
- Manmadha Leela Kamaraju Gola (1987)
- Mandaladeesudu (1987)
- Yamudiki Mogudu (1988)
- Brahma Putrudu (1988)
- Murali Krishnudu (1988)
- Donga Pelli (1988)
- Chuttalabbayi(1988)
- Donga Kollu (1988)
- O Bharya Katha (1988) as Krishnaveni
- Bazaar Rowdy (1988)
- Collector Vijaya (1988)
- Aanimuthyam (1988)
- Station Master (1988)
- August 15 Raatri (1988)
- Chilipi Dampathulu (1988)
- Chalaki Mogudu Chadastapu Pellam (1989)
- Goonda Rajyam (1989)
- Preminchi Choodu (1989)
- Soggaadi Kaapuram (1989) as Rattamma
- Bandhuvulostunnaru Jagratha (1989)
- Dorikithe Dongalu (1989)
- Vijay (1989)
- Pinni (1989)
- Paila Pachessu (1989)
- Vintha Dongalu (1989) as Seelavathi
- Chennapatnam Chinnollu (1989) as Costumes supplier for movies
- Attintlo Adde Mogudu (1990)
- Master Kapuram (1990)
- Kodama Simham (1990)
- Nagastram (1990)
- Dagudumuthala Dampathyam (1990)
- Iddaru Pellala Muddula Police(1991)
- Talli Tandrulu (1991)
- Prema Thapassu (1991)
- Madhura Nagarilo (1991)
- Attintlo Adde Mogudu (1991)
- Naa Ille Naa Swargam (1991)
- Minor Raja (1991)
- Ashwini (1991)
- Police Encounter (1991)
- Viyyala Vari Vindhu (1991)
- Mugguru Attala Muddula Alludu (1991)
- Edurinti Mogudu Pakkinti Pellam (1991)
- Shanti Kranti (1991)
- April 1 Vidudala (1991)
- Golmaal Govindam (1992)
- Subba Rayudi Pelli (1992)
- Pellam Chatu Mogudu (1992)
- Jagannatham & Sons (1992)
- Pelli Neeku Shobhanam Naaku (1992)
- Joker Mama Super Alludu (1992)
- Pellam Chepithe Vinali (1992)
- Srimaan Brahmachari (1992)
- Gowramma (1992)
- Chilara Mogudu Allari Koduku (1992)
- Pachani Samsaram (1992)
- Mogudu Pellala Dongata (1992)
- Kannayya Kittayya (1993)
- One By Two (1993)
- Kokkoro Ko (1993)
- Akka Pettanam Chelleli Kapuram (1993)
- Pellama Majaka (1993)
- Donga Alludu (1993)
- Nippu Ravva (1993)
- Kaliyugam (1993)
- Abbaigaru (1993)
- Chinna Alludu (1993)
- Aarambham (1993)
- Matru Devo Bhava (1993)
- Kunti Putrudu (1993)
- Chittemma Mogudu (1993)
- Jeevitham Oka Cinema (1993)
- Rowdy Gari Teacher (1993)
- Chirunavvula Varamistava (1993)
- Radha Sarathi (1993)
- Kurradhi Kurradu (1994) as Gaddar Gangamma
- Gandeevam (1994)
- Number One (1994)
- Bangaru Kutumbam (1994)
- Atha Kodallu (1994)
- Brahmachari Mogudu (1994)
- Sundara Vadana Subbulakshmi Moguda (1994)
- Top Hero (1994)
- Lucky Chance (1994)
- Namaste Anna (1994)
- Kishkindha Kanda (1994)
- Ammoru (1995)
- Chinnabbulu (1995)
- Guntur Gundamma Katha (1995)
- Aasthi Mooredu Aasa Bareedu (1995)
- Maatho Pettukoku (1995)
- Ammaleni Puttillu (1995)
- God Father (1995)
- Aalu Magalu (1995)
- Rambantu (1995)
- Sisindri (1995)
- Vaddu Bava Thappu (1995)
- Gulabi (1995)
- Lingababu Love Story(1995)
- Maya Bazaar (1995)
- Mummy Mee Aayanochadu (1996)
- Sarada Bullodu (1996)
- Vamsanikokkadu (1996)
- Ladies Doctor (1996)
- Pellala Rajyam (1996)
- Adhirindi Alludu (1996)
- Topi Raja Sweety Roja (1996)
- Vinodam (1996)
- Ramudochadu (1996)
- Maa Avida Collector (1996)
- Amma Durgamma (1996)
- Pelli (1997)
- Osi Naa Maradala (1997)
- Pattukondi Chuddam (1997)
- Chillakkottudu (1997)
- Oka Chinna Maata (1997)
- Devudu (1997)
- Abbai Gari Pelli (1997)
- Muddula Mogudu (1997)
- Egire Paavurama (1997)
- Aahwanam (1997)
- Priyamaina Srivaru (1997)
- Anaganaga Oka Roju (1997)
- Suswagatham (1998)
- Kalavari Chellelu Kanaka Mahalakshmi (1998)
- Subhakankshalu (1998)
- Ulta Palta (1998)
- Pandaga (1998)
- Gillikajjalu (1998)
- Andaru Hero Le (1998)
- Premaku Velayara (1999)
- Arundathi (1999)
- Iddaru Mithrulu (1999)
- Vichitram (1999)
- Raja (1999)
- Veedu Samanyudu Kadhu (1999)
- Nuvvu Vastavani (2000)
- Vamsoddharakudu (2000)
- Hands Up (2000)
- Manasichanu (2000)
- Sakutumba Saparivaara Sametam (2000)
- Navvuthu Bathakalira (2001)
- Railway Coolie (2001)
- Budget Padmanabham (2001)
- Adhipathi (2001)
- Subhakaryam (2001)
- Jackpot (2001)
- Youth (2005)
- Chatrapathi (2005)
- Pandurangadu (2008)
- Appu Chesi Pappu Koodu (2008)
- Manjeera (2009)
- Manchivadu (2011)
- All the Best (2012)
- Head Constable Venkatramaiah (2017)
- True Friends (2018)
- F2 - Fun and Frustration (2019)
- Tenali Ramakrishna BA. BL (2019)
- F3 (2021)

=== Tamil ===
- Vani Rani (1974)
- Manmatha Leelai (1976) as Bhargavi
- Moondru Mudichu (1976)
- Asai 60 Naal (1976)
- Pennai Solli Kuttramillai (1977)
- Raghupathi Raghavan Rajaram (1977)
- Avar Enakke Sontham (1977)
- Aarupushpangal (1977)
- Balaparichai (1977)
- Navarathinam (1977)
- Chakravarthy (1977)
- Aval Oru Athisayam (1978)
- Mudi Sooda Mannan (1978)
- Punniya Boomi (1978)
- Shri Kanchi Kamakshi (1978)
- Ival Oru Seethai (1978)
- Bairavi (1978)
- Ithu Eppadi Irukku (1978)
- Chakkalathi (1979)
- Karumbu Vil (1980)
- Rusi Kanda Poonai (1980)
- Engamma Maharani (1981)
- Pattam Parakkattum (1981)
- Kilinjalgal (1981)
- Thillu Mullu (1981)
- Meendum Santhippom (1981)
- Thanikattu Raja (1982)
- Marumagale Vazhga (1982)
- Nadodi Raja (1982)
- Kadhalithu Par (1982)
- Mann Vasanai (1983)
- Nallavanuku Nallavan (1984)
- Sanga Natham (1984)
- Aathora Aatha (1984)
- Antha Uravukku Satchi (1984)
- Nyayam Ketkiren (1984)
- Vaazhkai (1984)
- Unnai Naan Santhithen (1984)
- Poovilangu (1984)
- Nooravathu Naal (1984)
- Nilavu Suduvathillai (1984)
- Ingeyum Oru Gangai (1984)
- Mayoori (1985)
- Mangamma Sapatham (1985)
- Kalyana Agathigal (1985)
- Neethiyin Marupakkam (1985)
- Anbin Mugavari (1985)
- Kaakki Sattai (1985)
- Karimedu Karuvayan (1986)
- Muthal Vasantham (1986)
- Sippikkul Muthu (1986)
- Mythili Ennai Kaathali (1986)
- Marumagal (1986)
- December Pookal (1986)
- Sarvam Sakthimayam (1986)
- Jaathi Pookkal (1987)
- Koottu Puzhukkal (1987)
- Enga Ooru Pattukaran (1987)
- Jaathi Pookkal (1987)
- Aval Mella Sirithal (1988)
- En Thangai Kalyani (1988)
- Raththa Dhanam (1988)
- Thanga Kalasam (1988)
- Enga Ooru Kavalkaran (1988)
- Rajadhi Raja (1989)
- Thendral Puyalnadhu (1989)
- Paandi Nattu Thangam (1989)
- Aadi Velli (1990)
- Periya Veetu Pannakkaran (1990)
- Pattanamthan Pogalamadi (1990)
- Manaivi Oru Manickam (1990)
- Mounam Sammadham (1990)
- Naanum Indha Ooruthan (1990)
- Shanti Enathu Shanti (1991)
- Pondatti Pondattithan (1991)
- Nattukku Oru Nallavan (1991)
- Rendu Pondatti Kaavalkaaran (1992)
- Nadodi Pattukkaran (1992)
- Vaaname Ellai (1992)
- Varavu Ettana Selavu Pathana (1994)
- Hero (1994)
- Pattukottai Periyappa (1994)
- Pudhiya Mannargal (1994)
- En Aasai Thangachi (1996)
- Subash (1996)
- Rajakali Amman (2000)
- Kann Thirandhu Paaramma (2000)
- Sonnal Thaan Kaadhala (2001)
- Kadhal Azhivathillai (2002)
- Priyamana Thozhi (2003)
- Galatta Family (2025)

=== Malayalam ===
- Madaalasa (1978)
- Sandhyakku Virinja Poovu (1983)
- Poomadhathe Pennu Police Annamma (1984)
- Uyarum Njan Nadake (1985)...Vasumathi Amma
- Abhayam Thedi (1986)...Tessy
- Vasudha (1992)
- Indraprastham (1996) ... Susanna John
- Devadasi (1999)

=== Kannada ===
- Lakshmi Nivasa (1977)
- Shanti Kranti (1991)
- Shivanaga (1992)
- Simhada Mari (1997)
- Preethsod Thappa (1998)

=== Hindi ===
- bulandi
- Shanti Kranti (1991)

== Television ==
Year	Title	Role	Channel	Language
1995	Santiniketan		ETV	Telugu
2001	Chinna Papa Periya Papa		Sun TV	Tamil
2004–2006	Kalki	Vyjayanthi	Jaya TV	Tamil
2005	Comedy Dot Com		Vissa	Telugu
2005–2008	Aarthy	Parvathy	Raj TV	Tamil
2008–2013	Mogali Rekulu	Mahalaksmi	Gemini TV	Telugu
2008	Simran Thirai		Jaya TV	Tamil
2010	Abirami		Kalaignar TV	Tamil
2015–2016	Sindubad	Pattu Maami	Zee Tamizh	Tamil
2018	Agni Sakshi		Star Maa	Telugu
2018	Bangaru Gajulu		Zee Telugu	Telugu
2018–2019	Minnale		Sun TV	Tamil
2023	Yeda Loyallo Indra Dhanassu		Star Maa	Telugu
