= Roja Ramani =

Indian actress (born in 1959)

- रोजा रमानी
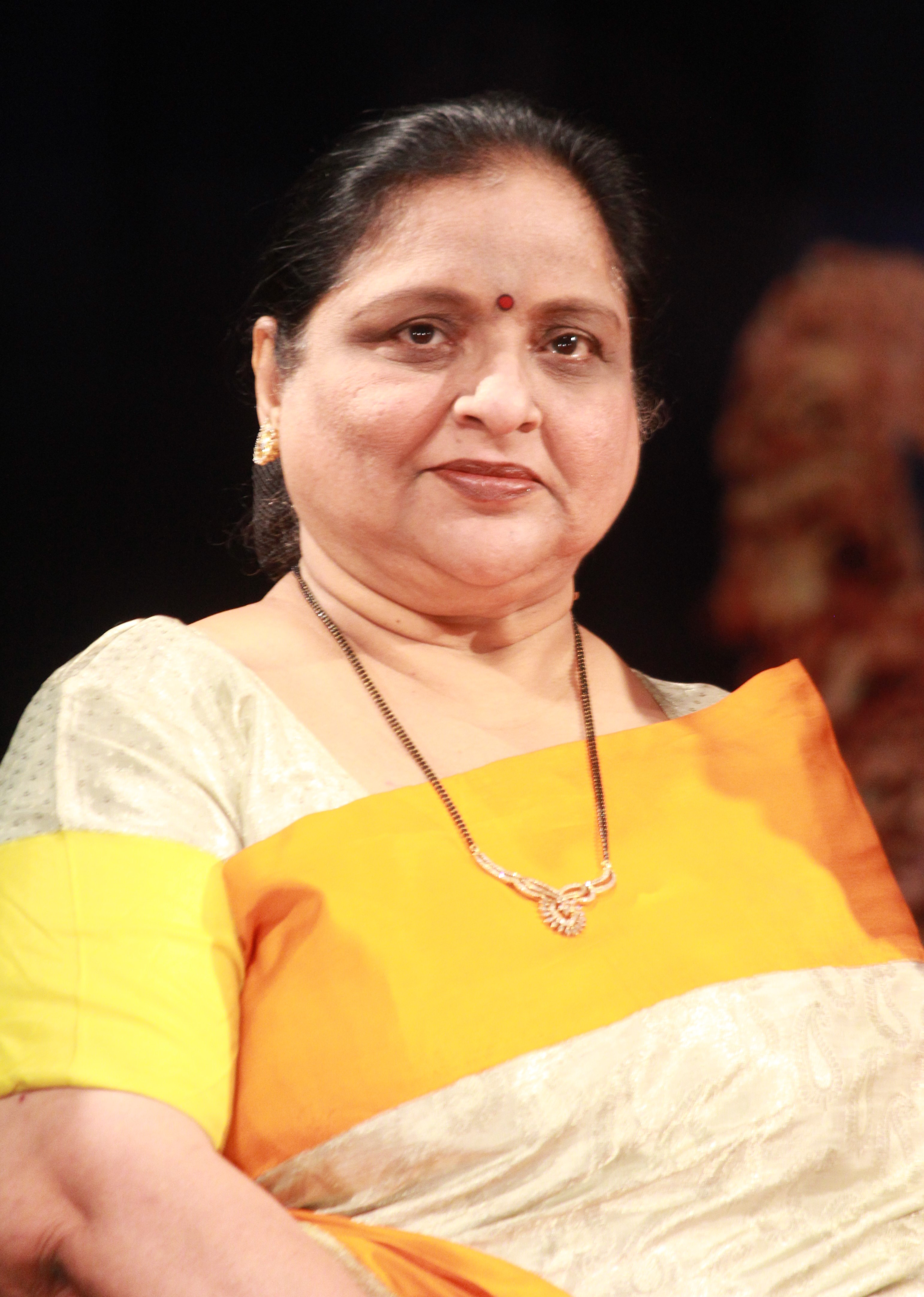
- Born: Rajahmundry, Andhra Pradesh, India
- Other name: Chemparathy Shobana
- Occupation: Actress
- Spouse: Chakrapani (m. 1981)
- Children: Tarun; Amulya

Roja Ramani (also known as Chemparathy Shobana) is an Indian actress and dubbing artist who predominantly worked in Malayalam, Telugu, and Tamil films. She was a child actor and her debut movie was Bhakta Prahlada (1967) for which she received National Film Award for Best Child Artist. She was popular during the 1970s and early 1980s and has acted in Malayalam, Telugu, Tamil, Kannada, and Odia movies. She worked in over 400 Telugu films as a dubbing artist for various heroines. She is an active member of BlueCross and is involved in several social service activities.

== Early life ==
She was born in Rajahmundry, Andhra Pradesh, India in c. 1959 as the only child to her parents. Her father was a journalist with Picture Post. The family relocated to Madras when she was 6 months old.

== Career ==
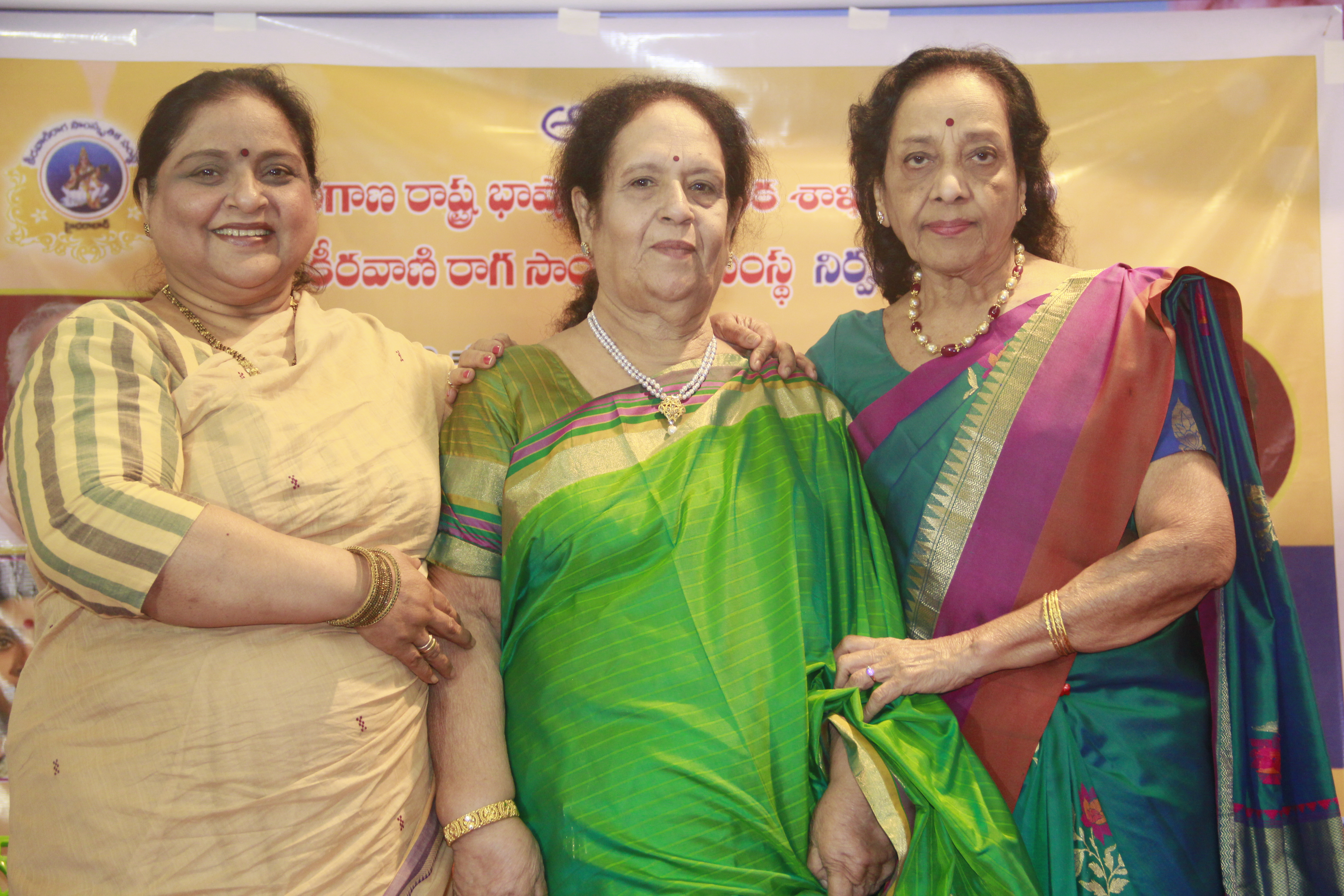
Ramani seen leftmost

She had started her career at the age of 7 in 1966 in the title role of Bhaktha Prahaladha in Telugu. It is the first full-length Eastman color feature film which was produced by AVM Productions. It was a blockbuster hit film. She acted in more than 40 films as a child artist and at the age of 13 she acted as a lead in the Malayalam movie Chemparathy which went on to be a record breaking hit and was a trendsetter at the time. The movie was remade with Roja Ramani in Telugu as Kanne Vayasu and in Tamil as Paruva Kaalam which also went on to be huge hits.

She has acted in more than 130 films in Telugu, Tamil, Kannada, Malayalam, Hindi and Odia. She also lent her voice for over 400 films in Telugu and Tamil for the leading heroines at the time like Suhasini, Meena, Roja, Radhika, Soundarya, Ramba, Ramya Krishna, Vijaya Shanthi, Shilpa Shetty, Divya Bharathi, Nagma, and Khushbu.

She won the AP State Television Award, International Children's Film Festival Award, Filmfare Award, International Film Festival - Indian Panorama Award, and Zee Kutumbam Award.

== Personal life ==
She married Chakrapani, a Telugu actor in Odia and Telugu films, in 1981 at the age of 22, after meeting him on the sets of the Odia film Punarmilan (1977). He later became a producer, director, and the head of ETV Oriya. They have a son, Tarun, an actor in Telugu cinema, and a daughter, Amulya, who holds a degree in psychology and works as an interior designer.

== Awards ==
National Film Award for Best Child Artist for portraying Prahlada in Bhakta Prahlada – 1967

- 1972: Filmfare Best Actress Malayalam — Chembarathy

She has won more than 50 awards for her performances and voice dubbing. Like AP State Govt. NANDI Awards, Kerala State Govt, FilmFare, Cinema Express, Cine Herald, Malayala Manorama, Cine Goers, Madras Film Fans Associaction etc.

She was felicitated in 75 years of Indian Cinema Celebration and also in 100 years Cinema Celebration.

She has been honored in America, by Telugu Fine Arts Community in New Jersey and by Telugu Association in Tampa, Florida for her lifetime achievement and contribution to film industry. She was honored with Santosham Lifetime Achievement Award for her contribution to Tollywood, at 15th Santosham Film Awards

In 2019, she received Santosham Excellence Award at 16th Santosham Film Awards.

== Filmography ==
Year	Film	Role	Language	Notes
1967	Iru Malargal	Geetha	Tamil	
1967	Bhakta Prahalada		Tamil	
1967	Bhakta Prahalada		Telugu	
1968	En Thambi	Uma	Tamil	
1968	Bedi Bandavalu		Kannada	
1968	Chinnari Papalu		Telugu	
1968	Sathi Arundathi		Telugu	
1968	Asadhyudu		Telugu	
1969	Shanti Nilayam		Tamil	
1969	Kuzhandhai Ullam		Tamil	
1969	Sattekalapu Satteya		Telugu	
1969	Jarigina Katha		Telugu	
1970	Ethiroli	Raji	Tamil	
1970	Vilayattu Pillai		Tamil	
1970	Enga Mama	Sarojini	Tamil	
1970	Janaki Sabatham		Tamil	
1970	Namma Kuzhanthaigal		Tamil	
1970	Thalli Thandrulu		Telugu	
1970	Sridevi		Telugu	
1971	Poompaatta	Sumathy	Malayalam	Credited as Shobana
1971	Inquilab Sindabad		Malayalam	Credited as Shobana
1971	Babu	Young Ammu	Tamil	
1971	Ramalayam		Telugu	
1971	Bhagyavanthudu		Telugu	
1971	Vichithra Dampathyam		Telugu	
1971	Thande Makkalu		Kannada	
1972	Chembarathy	Santha	Malayalam	Credited as Shobana
1972	Apna Desh	Sharda	Hindi	Uncredited
1972	Bullemma Bullodu		Telugu	
1972	Sri Krishnanjaneya Yuddham		Telugu	
1972	Maa Inti Velugu		Telugu	
1973	Chaayam		Malayalam	Credited as Shobana
1973	Mazhakkaru	Shantha	Malayalam	Credited as Shobana
1973	Darshanam		Malayalam	Credited as Shobana
1973	Gayathry		Malayalam	Credited as Shobana
1973	Panitheeratha Veedu	Leela	Malayalam	Credited as Shobana
1973	Anbu Sagodharargal		Tamil	
1973	Kanne Vayasu		Telugu	
1973	Ramarajyam		Telugu	
1973	Marapurani Manishi		Telugu	
1973	Jaise Ko Taisa	Munni	Hindi	Jeetendra's (Vijay's) sister
1974	Kaamini		Malayalam	Credited as Shobana
1974	Bhoogolam Thiriyunnu		Malayalam	Credited as Shobana
1974	Paruva Kaalam		Tamil	
1974	En Magan	Kamala	Tamil	
1974	O Seeta Katha		Telugu	
1974	Inti Kodalu		Telugu	
1974	Adambaralu Anubhandalu		Telugu	
1974	Evariki Vare Yamuna Theere		Telugu	
1974	Tatamma Kala		Telugu	
1974	Anaganaga Oka Thandri		Telugu	
1974	Ram Raheem		Telugu	
1975	Mattoru Seetha		Malayalam	Credited as Shobana
1975	Moguda Pellama		Telugu	
1975	Bali Peetam	Sarada's sister	Telugu	
1975	Annadammula Katha		Telugu	
1975	Samsaram		Telugu	
1975	Bharatamlo Oka Ammayi		Telugu	
1975	Jebu Donga		Telugu	
1976	Amma		Malayalam	Credited as Shobana
1976	Needhikku Thalaivanangu		Tamil	
1976	Janaki Sabatham		Tamil	
1976	Muthyala Pallaki		Telugu	
1976	Raaja	Lakshmi	Telugu	
1976	Monagadu	Padma	Telugu	
1976	Mahatmudu		Telugu	
1976	Manavoori Katha		Telugu	
1977	Sangamam		Malayalam	Credited as Shobana
1977	Anantham Paramanantham		Malayalam	Credited as Shobana
1977	Alu Magalu		Telugu	
1977	Khaidi Kalidasu		Telugu	
1977	Ganga Yamuna Saraswathi		Telugu	
1977	Maa Iddari Katha		Telugu	
1977	Rambha Urvasi Menaka		Telugu	
1977	Kokila		Kannada	
1977	Punarmilan		Odia	
1978	Puthariyankam		Malayalam	Credited as Shobana
1978	Vayasu Ponnu	Radhika	Tamil	
1978	Vandikkaran Magan	Kokila	Tamil	
1978	Lambadolla Ramadasu		Telugu	
1978	Muyyige Muyyi		Kannada	
1978	Havina Hejje		Kannada	
1978	Sati Anasuya		Odia	
1978	Patipatni		Odia	
1979	Venalil Oru Mazha		Malayalam	Credited as Shobana
1979	Maalika Paniyunnavar		Malayalam	Credited as Shobana
1979	Yakshipparu		Malayalam	Credited as Shobana
1979	Jeevitham Oru Gaanam	Omana	Malayalam	Credited as Shobana
1979	Raathrikal Ninakku Vendi		Malayalam	Credited as Shobana
1979	Sigappukkal Mookkuthi	Vaidhegi	Tamil	
1979	Aadu Pambe		Tamil	
1979	Iru Nilavugal	Chellam	Tamil	
1979	Driver Ramudu	Meena	Telugu	
1979	Sommokadidhi Sokokadidhi		Telugu	
1979	Punadhirallu	Shanthi	Telugu	
1980	Idimuzhakkam	Panchali	Malayalam	Credited as Shobana
1980	Agnikshethram	Radha	Malayalam	Credited as Shobana
1980	Palattu Kunjikannan		Malayalam	Credited as Shobana
1980	Moorkhan	Rajani	Malayalam	Credited as Shobana
1980	Rajaneegandhi	Usha	Malayalam	Credited as Shobana
1980	Ambala Vilakku	Savithri	Malayalam	Credited as Shobana
1980	Pappu	Herself	Malayalam	Credited as Shobana
1980	Aayiram Vaasal Idhayam	Vijaya	Tamil	
1980	Rakta Bandham		Telugu	
1980	Nayakudu Vinayakudu		Telugu	
1981	Raktham		Malayalam	Credited as Shobana
1981	Oothikachiya Ponnu	Shalini	Malayalam	Credited as Shobana
1981	Sanchari	Sumam	Malayalam	Credited as Shobana
1981	Kadathu	Maalu	Malayalam	Credited as Shobana
1981	Sri Anjaneya Charithra		Telugu	
1981	Dari Tappina Manishi		Telugu	
1981	Bangarada Mane		Kannada	
1981	Bhoomige Banda Bhagavantha		Kannada	
1981	Sita Lavakush		Odia	
1982	Murai Ponnu		Tamil	
1982	Sangili	Santha	Tamil	
1982	Samaya Bada Balaban		Odia	
1985	Jeevante Jeevan		Malayalam	Credited as Shobana
1985	Kongumudi		Telugu	
1986	Magadheerudu		Telugu	
1986	Kashmora		Telugu	
1991	Assembly Rowdy	News Reader	Telugu	

== Dubbing Credits ==
Dubbed for	Films
Suhasini	Nirdoshi (1984) (First film); Intiguttu (1984); Manishiko Charitra (1984); Challenge (1984); Justice Chakravarthy (1984); Illalu Priyuralu (1984); Kongumudi (1985); Magaraju (1985); Sravana Sandhya (1986); Aradhana (1987); Chuttalabbayi (1988); Bala Gopaludu (1989)
Archana	Nireekshana (1986); Parama Sivudu (1991)
Radha	Kaliyuga Krishnudu (1986); Adavi Raja (1986); Yamudiki Mogudu (1988); Bharya Bhartalu (1988); Ramudu Bheemudu (1988); Lankeshwarudu (1989); Dorikithe Dongalu (1989); Soggadi Kaapuram (1989); Kodama Simham (1990); Aayudham (1990)
Rajani	Rendu Rella Aaru (1986); Pratidwani (1986); Majnu (1987); Collector Gari Abbayi (1987); Agni Putrudu (1987); Bhale Mogudu (1987); Aha Naa Pellanta! (1987); Muddu Bidda (1987); Brahma Putrudu (1988); Jeevana Ganga (1988); Murali Krishnudu (1988); Chikkadu Dorakadu (1988); Gaduggai (1989); Chalaki Mogudu Chadastapu Pellam (1989); Bandhuvulostunnaru Jagratha (1989); Dhruva Nakshatram (1989); Neram Nadi Kadu (1989); Prananiki Pranam (1990)
Shobana	Vikram (1986); Muddula Manavudu (1987); Manavadostunnaadu (1987); Ajeyudu (1987); Muvva Gopaludu (1987); Abhinandana (1988); Rudra Veena (1988); Paapa Kosam (1988); Alludugaru (1990); Appula Appa Rao (1991); Minor Raja (1991); Rowdy Gaari Pellam (1991); Ahankari (1992); Champion (1992); Gang War (1992); Rakshana (1993); Rendilla Poojari (1993)
Khushbu	Kaliyuga Pandavulu (1986); Captain Nagarjun (1986); Chinnodu Peddodu (1988); Prema Kireetam (1988); Chinni Krishnudu (1988)
Bhanupriya	Kashmora (1986); Aayanaki Mugguru (1991)
Farah	Vijetha Vikram (1987)
Mandakini	Bhargava Ramudu (1987)
Ranjini	Brahma Rudrulu (1987)
Gautami	Srinivasa Kalyanam (1987); Bamma Maata Bangaru Baata (1990); Chaitanya (1991)
Amala	Chinababu (1988); Raktha Tilakam (1988)
Vijayashanti	Athaku Yamudu Ammayiki Mogudu (1989); Indrudu Chandrudu (1989); Muddula Mavayya (1989); Muddula Menalludu (1990)
Juhi Chawla	Vicky Daada (1989)
Urvashi	Michael Madana Kama Rajan (1990) (Telugu Dubbed version); Chakram (2005)
Aishwarya	Adavilo Abhimanyudu (1989); Pellante Noorella Panta (1992); Subba Rayudi Pelli (1992); Brahma (1992)
Yamuna	Mouna Poratam (1989); Puttinti Pattu Cheera (1990); Ghatana (1990); Udayamam (1990); Yerra Mandaram (1991); Mamagaru (1991); Premaku Padu Sutralu (1991); Surigadu (1992); Rajadhani (1993); Brahmachari Mogudu (1994)
Divya Bharti	Bobbili Raja (1990); Rowdy Alludu (1991); Naa Ille Naa Swargam (1991); Assembly Rowdy (1991); Chittemma Mogudu (1992); Dharma Kshetram (1992); Tholi Muddhu (1993)
Meena	Seetharamayya Gari Manavaralu (1991); Indra Bhavanam (1991); Aswamedham (1992); Moratudu Naa Mogudu (1992); Chanti (1992); Allari Mogudu (1992); Allari Pilla (1992); President Gari Pellam (1992); Sundarakanda (1992); Bangaru Maama (1992); Mutha Mestri (1993); Allari Alludu (1993); Abbaigaru (1993); Rajeswari Kalyanam (1993); Konguchatu Krishnadu (1993); Bhale Pellam (1994); Bobbili Simham (1994); Punya Bhoomi Naa Desam (1995); Aalu Magalu (1995); Chilakapachcha Kaapuram (1995); Muddula Mogudu (1997); Suryavamsam (1998 film) (1998); Bobbili Vamsham (1999); Velugu Needalu (1999)
Malashri	Prema Khaidi (1991); Urmila (1993); Allari Police (1994) Thodi kodallu (1994)
Naresh	Chitram Bhalare Vichitram (1991) (voice for the female character of Naresh (as "Prema"))
Nirosha	Kobbari Bondam (1991)
Meenakshi Seshadri	Brahmarshi Vishwamitra (1991)
Tabu	Coolie No. 1 (1991); Chennakesava Reddy (2002)
Sithara	Niyantha (1991); Srivari Chindulu (1991); Prema Shikaram (1992)
Roja	Seetharatnam Gari Abbayi (1992); Bhairava Dweepam (1994); Mugguru Monagallu (1994); Subhalagnam (1994); Ghatotkachudu (1995); Big Boss (1995); Pokkiri Raja (1995); Vajram (1995); Sri Krishnarjuna Vijayam (1996); Peddannayya (1997); Adavilo Anna (1997); Annamayya (film) (1997); Sultan (1999)
Mamta Kulkarni	Donga Police (1992)
Rambha	Tholi Muddhu (1993); Vetagadu (1995); Maatho Pettukoku (1995); Bombay Priyudu (1996); Hitler (1997); Ganesh (1998); Bavagaru Bagunnara? (1998); Mechanic Mavayya (1999); Moodu Mukkalaata (2000)
Nagma	Major Chandrakanth (1993); Kondapalli Raja (1993); Mugguru Monagallu (1994); Gangmaster (1994); Super Police (1995); Bharatha Simham (1995); Saradha Bullodu (1996)
Madhu Bala	Allari Priyudu (1993)
Revathi	Ankuram (1993)
Ramya Krishnan	Major Chandrakanth (1993); Mugguru Monagallu (1994); Allari Premikudu (1994); Muddula Priyudu (1994); Raja Simham (1995); Muddai Muddugumma (1995); Gharana Bullodu (1995); Amma Ammani Chudalani Undhi (1996); Dharma Chakram (1996); Soggadi Pellam (1996); Devudu (1997); Annamaya (1997); Kante Koothurne Kanu (1998); Love Story 1999 (1998); Iddaru Mitrulu (1999); English Pellam East Godavari Mogudu (1999); Vamsoddarakudu (2000); Kshemamga Velli Labamgarandi (2000); Manasu Paddanu Kaani (2000)
Aamani	Preme Naa Pranam (1993); Maro Quit India (1994); Aalumagalu (1995); Seethakka (1997)
Ooha	Aame (1994); Adalla Majaka (1995); Aayanaki Iddaru (1995); Patha Basti (1995); Sahanam (1996); Family (1996); Ooha (1996); Amma Nanna Kavali (1996); Amma Leni Puttillu (1996); Koothuru (1996); Amma Durgamma (1996); Nayanamma (1997); Aayanagaru (1998)
Sukanya	Captain (1994); Bharayteeyudu (1996)
Surabhi	Allarodu (1994); M. Dharmaraju M.A. (1994)
Monica Bedi	Tajmahal (1995); Sivayya (1998)
Priya Raman	Srivari Priyuralu (1996); Maa Voori Maraju (1996)
Shilpa Shetty	Sahasa Veerudu Sagara Kanya (1996)
Ranjitha	Maavichiguru (1996); Tata Manavadu (1996)
Prema	Maa Avida Collector (1996); Korukunna Priyudu (1997); Omkaram (1997)
Madhurima	Gunshot (1996)
Ruchita Prasad	Chelikudu (1997)
Rachna Banerjee	Pedda Manushulu (1999); Antha Mana Manchike (2000)
Anjala Zaveri	Samarasimha Reddy (1999)
Soundarya	Raja (1999); Postman (2000)
Twinkle Khanna	Seenu (1999)
Geetha	Nuvvostanante Nenoddantana (2005)
Leena Siddu	Lanka (2017)
