= Babu (1985 film) =

1985 Bollywood film

- Directed by: A. C. Tirulokchandar
- Written by: A. C. Tirulokchandar
- Based on: Odeyil Ninnu by P. Kesavadev
- Produced by: V. R. Parameshwaram
- Starring: Rajesh Khanna; Hema Malini; Mala Sinha; Rati Agnihotri; Deepak Parashar; Madan Puri
- Music by: Rajesh Roshan
- Release date: 4 October 1985
- Country: India
- Language: Hindi

Babu (Sir) is a 1985 Bollywood film starring Rajesh Khanna in the lead role, along with Hema Malini, Mala Sinha, Rati Agnihotri, and Deepak Parashar in supporting roles. The music was composed by Rajesh Roshan. It is a remake of a Tamil film of the same name from 1971 directed by A. C. Tirulokchandar and starring Sivaji Ganesan, which itself was a remake of the 1965 Malayalam film Odayil Ninnu, a film adaptation of Malayalam writer P. Kesavadev's acclaimed 1942 novel of the same title.

== Plot ==
Babu, a young man who works as a rickshaw puller, has fallen in love with Kammo. His only true friend is Shambhunath. One day he helps Shankarlal and his family and in return, Shankarlal invites him to his house. Shankarlal's wife Parvati and daughter Pinky also shower love on Babu. Babu having led a tough childhood feels grateful for the respect given to him. Meanwhile, a goon Jaggu rapes Kammo and Babu kills him, landing in jail for 2 years.

After his release he is shocked to find Pinky begging in the streets and learns that Parvati is now a widow. His sole aim now is to help them. He drives a hand-drawn rickshaw and uses the money to send Pinky to a decent school.

A grown-up Pinky starts disliking Babu. The rest of the story is how Pinky realizes her folly, how Parvati feels indebted to Babu for having helped them in return for the respect and kindness their family showed him one day.

== Cast ==
- Rajesh Khanna as Babu
- Hema Malini as Kammo
- Rati Agnihotri as Pinky
- Deepak Parashar as Prem
- Mala Sinha as Parvati
- Navin Nischol as Shankarlal
- Madan Puri as Shambhunath
- Roopesh Kumar as Jaggu Dada
- Mukri as Police Constable

== Music ==
- "Aise Rang De Piya" - Kishore Kumar, Lata Mangeshkar
- "Main Kuwari Albeli" - Kishore Kumar, Asha Bhosle
- "Yeh Mera Jeevan Tere Liye Hai" (duet) - Kishore Kumar, Alka Yagnik
- "Yeh Mera Jeevan" (Slow Version) - Kishore Kumar
- "Yeh Mera Jeevan" (female) - Alka Yagnik
- "Ae Hawa" - Lata Mangeshkar
