= P. N. Menon (director) =

Indian film director (1926–2008)

P. Narayankutty Menon
- Born: 2 January 1926; Wadakkancherry, Kingdom of Cochin, British India (present day Thrissur, Kerala, India)
- Died: 9 September 2008 (aged 82); Kochi, Ernakulam, Kerala, India
- Occupations: Director; Art director; Promotional poster designer
- Years active: 1963–2008
- Spouse: Bharathi Menon
- Relatives: Bharathan (nephew)

Palissery Narayanankutty Menon alias P. N. Menon (2 January 1926 – 9 September 2008) was an Indian film director and art director in the Malayalam cinema. He is also famous as a designer of promotional posters. Menon was also the uncle of another popular film director Bharathan, being the younger brother of the latter's father. In 2001, he was honoured with the J. C. Daniel Award, Kerala government's highest honour for contributions to Malayalam cinema.

== Early life ==
Born in Wadakkancherry, he completed his studies at Thrissur and from School of Art in Chennai. He came to Chennai when he was only 20 years old. He couldn't find any job in Chennai, so travelled to Salem and become a production boy in a Studio. But, after two-and-a-half years, the studio was shut down and went back to Chennai. He got back to sketches, then painting, then doing magazine covers. One of his designing assignments was for one of Producer B. Nagi Reddy's magazines. The production house was so impressed with his talent that when they bought Vahini Studio in 1951, Nagi Reddy's son appointed him as a paid apprentice in the painting department.

He got a job as an art director in an English play produced by the daughter of the then Andhra Chief Minister. They had three performances in Delhi, one for the then Vice President Dr. Sarvepalli Radhakrishnan, another for then Prime Minister Jawaharlal Nehru and the third for then Army Chief Field Marshal K. M. Cariappa. Ninamaninja Kalpadukal was his first movie Malayalam movie as the art director and his debut in the field of film direction in the 60s with the film Rosie (1965).

== Career ==
Menon's Olavum Theeravum based on M. T. Vasudevan Nair's script and released in 1970. It won the Kerala State Film Award for Best Film. Menon's boldest film is Kuttiyedathi (Eldest Sister), again based on a short story by M. T. Vasudevan Nair.

Perhaps his most successful commercial film was Chembarathi (Hibiscus) which was based on a script by Malayattoor Ramakrishnan and starred newcomers like Raghavan, Sudhir and Roja Ramani (Sobhana) along with veteran actors like Madhu and Rani Chandra. Another script of Malayattoor Ramakrishnan named Gayathri which was directed by him was awarded the President's Special Film Award Medal for National Integration. Menon's film Malamukalile Daivam, has won National Award too.

After a long period of absence lasting more than a decade, he directed a film, Nerkkuneraey ("Face to Face"), in (2004).

== Poster Designer ==
Menon made a name as a versatile Poster Designer as well. He artistic posters always helped the film to gain attention of cinegoers. He has also done posters even for Bollywood films like Anokha Rishta starring Rajesh Khanna. Some of the Malayalam films he had designed posters are Oomakkuyil, Kakkothikkavile Appooppan Thaadikal, Itha Innu Muthal, Poomadhathe Pennu, Aavanazhi, Amrutham Gamaya and Manivathoorile Aayiram Sivarathrikal.

== Personal life ==
His wife's name was Bharathi Menon and they had two daughters, named Rajasree and Jayasree. Popular film director Bharathan was his nephew, and was trained by him in direction. Bharathan predeceased his uncle.

== Death ==
During his last years, Menon lived with his daughter in Kochi. He suffered from many serious illnesses like Alzheimer's disease during this period. Finally, he died on 9 September 2008 aged 82, at a private hospital in Kochi. He was cremated with full state honours at Ravipuram Crematorium the next day.

== Awards ==
=== Kerala State Film Awards ===
- 1970 – Best Film: Olavum Theeravum
- 1972 – Second Best Film: Chembarathi
- 1973 – Second Best Film: Gayathri
- 1983 – Special Jury Award: Malamukalile Daivam
- 2001 – J. C. Daniel Award

=== National Film Awards ===
- 1973 – Best Feature Film in Malayalam: Gayathri
- 1983 – Best Feature Film in Malayalam: Malamukalile Daivam

== Filmography ==
Year	Film	Notes
1965	Rosie	
1970	Olavum Theeravum	
1971	Kuttyedathi	
1972	Panimudakku	
1972	Chembarathi	
1972	Mappusakshi	
1973	Gayathri	
1973	Darsanam	
1973	Mazhakkaaru	
1973	Chayam	
1975	Odakkuzhal	
1977	Taxi Driver	
1978	Udayam Kizhakku Thanne	
1979	Devathai	Tamil film
1981	Archana Teacher	
1982	Anu	Tamil film
1983	Malamukalile Daivam	
1983	Kadamba	
1983	Glimpses of Kerala	Documentary film
1983	Asthram	
1989	Padippura	
2004	Nerkku Nere	
