= Oruvan =

Oruvan (lit. 'One') may refer to:

- Oruvan (1999 film), an Indian Tamil-language action drama film
- Oruvan (2006 film), an Indian Malayalam-language film
