= Veluchami =

- Directed by: Arul
- Written by: Arul
- Produced by: K. Muralidharan; V. Swaminathan; G. Venugopal
- Starring: R. Sarathkumar; Vineetha; Shruthi
- Cinematography: K. Muthukumar
- Edited by: K. Pazhanivel
- Music by: Deva
- Production company: Lakshmi Movie Makers
- Release date: 15 January 1995
- Running time: 128 minutes
- Country: India
- Language: Tamil

Veluchami (/veɪlutʃɑːmi/) is a 1995 Indian Tamil-language drama film written and directed by Arul in his debut. The film stars R. Sarathkumar, Vineetha and newcomer Shruthi. It was released on 15 January 1995. The film is loosely based on the 1965 Tamil film Neela Vaanam.

== Plot ==
Veluchami was brought up by Periya Ayya, a rich man, since his mother died and his uncle Maruthu tried to sell him when he was a kid. Later, Periya Ayya's wife died while she was pregnant. By a miracle, the baby was still alive and this baby girl was named Chinnamma, Veluchami took care of her.

Many years later, Veluchami becomes a heart-of-gold man who helps the villagers, and he cannot tolerate injustice. His uncle Maruthu and his daughter Rasathi come to his village, Rasathi falls in love with Veluchami and she compels him to marry her. In the meantime, Veluchami clashes with a rich landlord and his son Raja.

Finally, Veluchami promises Rasathi to marry her. Chinnamma's dream is having a lot of children. So Veluchami looks for a groom for her, but Periya Ayya refuses for her marriage because he promises to God that he will give her to the temple if she survived. Veluchami cannot accept it and he marries her by force to save her dreams.

In fact, Periya Ayya lied and he tells the truth to Veluchami. Chinnamma's body is too weak for giving birth, so Periya Ayya tries to postpone his daughter's marriage as late as possible. Veluchami is then heartbroken. The rest of the story is what happens to Veluchami, Chinnamma and Rasathi.

== Cast ==
- R. Sarathkumar as Veluchami
- Vineetha as Rasathi
- Shruthi as Chinnamma
- Goundamani as Kathavarayan
- Senthil as Kannan
- Jai Ganesh as Periya Ayya
- Captain Raju
- Kazan Khan as Raja
- Manorama as Chinnamma's grandmother
- Delhi Ganesh as Maruthu, Rasathi's father
- Charuhasan
- Pandu
- K. R. Savithri
- Naveena
- Idichapuli Selvaraj
- King Kong
- Thennavan

== Production ==
Veluchami marked the directorial debut of Arul, who earlier assisted P. Vasu. This was the second time Lakshmi Movie Makers collaborated with Sarathkumar after Aranmanai Kaavalan (1994). Madhubala was originally approached as lead actress. Shruti, who acted in the Hindi serial Sri Krishna made her Tamil debut with the film. The filming was entirely done at Pollachi.

== Soundtrack ==
The music was composed by Deva.

Song	Singer(s)	Lyrics	Duration
"Chinnamma" (male)	S. P. Balasubrahmanyam	Vairamuthu	5:08
"Chinnamma" (female)	K. S. Chithra	Vairamuthu	5:08
"Chinnamma Enga"	Gangai Amaran, Mano, Swarnalatha	Vairamuthu	4:48
"En Veetu Thotatil"	Gangai Amaran	Vairamuthu	3:20
"Kan Azhagu"	S. P. Balasubrahmanyam, K. S. Chithra	Vairamuthu	4:43
"Monica Monica"	S. P. Balasubrahmanyam, Swarnalatha	Vairamuthu	4:55
"Uyire Uyire"	Swarnalatha	Piraisoodan	5:17

== Reception ==
K. Vijiyan of New Straits Times wrote, "Despite Sarath's good acting and two pretty actresses, there is nothing much to make this movie outstanding". R. P. R. of Kalki appreciated Sarathkumar's performance and called the film's background score its biggest strength.
