= Ooha (film) =

- Poster
- Directed by: Sivala Prabhakar
- Written by: Sivala Prabhakar
- Produced by: Thalluri Veeralakshmi Narayana; S. Durga Prasad
- Starring: Vikram; Ooha; Ali; Subhashri
- Cinematography: Relangi Ravindranath
- Edited by: Trinath
- Music by: J. V. Raghavulu
- Production company: Sri Sairathna International
- Distributed by: Iyyapu Kurma Rao
- Release date: 12 January 1996
- Running time: 136 minutes
- Country: India
- Language: Telugu

Ooha is a 1996 Indian Telugu-language romantic thriller film written by and directed by Sivala Prabhakar. It stars Vikram, Ooha, Ali and Subhashri. The film was released on 12 January 1996 and was not successful at the box office.

== Plot ==
Bosu's sister is cheated by her college mate Mohan, who dies after handing over her child to Bosu. Therefore, Bosu, along with the child, goes on a search for Mohan to avenge his sister.

Mohan, who has just completed his degree, gets a job in Ooha's father's company. He manages to trap Ooha in love. Her father accepts their marriage and decides to hand over the company to Mohan. However, Mohan is already to married to his cousin Vani after taking a dowry of 1 lakh from his uncle for his higher studies. Vani, who used to stay in her hometown, now returns to the city to live with Mohan. Ooha is unaware that Mohan is already married.

One day, a group of miscreants harasses Vani, but Bosu comes to her rescue. Ooha also joins, and they shame the miscreants in public. Later, Bosu meets Ooha and tells her that he is on a search for a cheat named Mohan, but Ooha does not realize that it is the same Mohan she loves. Meanwhile, Mohan attempts to kill Vani by leaking the house gas but fails.

Ooha invites Vani to her wedding with Mohan. After seeing the photos on the wedding card, Vani is shocked to learn the truth about her husband. Mohan returns home, tells Vani that he intends to move to another city for a job, and asks her to go to her hometown for a month. Vani, who realizes Mohan's ploy, refuses to leave and gets beaten up by him. One day, Bosu is hit by the miscreants in retaliation right in front of Vani's house. Vani treats him and feeds him for the day.

Bosu leaves but sees Mohan in traffic. Bosu runs behind Mohan's car to catch him. Mohan arrives at his home and realizes that Vani is pregnant. Mohan tells her that he intends to marry Ooha and kills Vani in rage as Bosu screams at him from the window. Mohan then hits Bosu and the child with his car in order to kill them, but they manage to survive. Bosu regains his consciousness at night and thinks that the child is dead, thus deciding to kill Mohan himself. However, Mohan's wedding with Ooha takes place as Bosu arrives, so he escapes from there. Mohan then leaves to dump Vani's body to clean up the evidence. At the same time, Bosu manages to meet Ooha and tell her the truth.

During their wedding night, Ooha acts like usual and pranks Mohan that she fed poisoned milk to him. When Mohan hugs her in relief, she stabs him for his sins. Mohan escapes from there and stumbles upon the child, who wakes up and cries. Ooha gets the child to remove her mangala sutra and tells him that their marriage is void as it is removed by his own son. Mohan gains the strength to attack her from behind, but Bosu manages to stab him to death, although he succumbs to his earlier wounds. Ooha walks away with the child.

== Cast ==
- Vikram as Mohan
- Ooha as Ooha
- Ali as Bosu
- Subhashri as Vani
- Kaikala Satyanarayana as Ooha's father
- P. L. Narayana as Vani's father
- M. S. Narayana
- Ironleg Sastri
- Tummalapalli
- Rajasekhar Chowdhary
- D. Subbaraju
- Narayana Master
- Jaggu
- Lakshmipati
- Ravindra
- Gadiraju Ramaraju
- Satyavadhamma
- Sunitha Devi
- Krishnapriya

== Production ==
Vikram and Ali had previously starred together Aadaalla Majaka, in which Vikram played the protagonist. However, in this film Ali was the protagonist and Vikram was the antagonist. The film was in production in mid-1995.

== Soundtrack ==
Ooha

Soundtrack album by J. V. Raghavulu
- Genre: Feature film soundtrack
- Language: Telugu
- Producer: J. V. Raghavulu

The soundtrack album was composed by J. V. Raghavulu, while S. P. Balasubrahmanyam sang all five songs.

Tracklist

No.	Title	Length
1.	"Chikkindi Chukkalloni"
2.	"Idi Akaliyugamu"
3.	"Siri Siri Navvula"
4.	"Ooha"
5.	"Vedekke Vennello"

== Reception and box office ==
C. Narayana Rao of Zamin Ryot appreciated the direction and screenplay by Prabhakar. Rao added that Prabhakar brought novelty in his execution in an otherwise routine storyline. Vikram's performance as a villain was praised.

The film went unnoticed at the box office. Sivala Prabhakar took a break from direction and only returned in 2010 with Srimathi Kalyanam starring Vadde Naveen.
