= Marapurani Manishi =

1973 film by T. Rama Rao

- Theatrical release poster
- Directed by: T. Rama Rao
- Written by: Acharya Aatreya (dialogues)
- Screenplay by: T. Rama Rao
- Story by: P. Kesavadev
- Produced by: N. N. Bhatt
- Starring: Akkineni Nageswara Rao; Manjula
- Cinematography: S. Venkataratnam
- Edited by: J. Krishna Swamy; Balu
- Music by: K. V. Mahadevan
- Production company: Sri Uma Productions
- Release date: 23 November 1973
- Running time: 139 minutes
- Country: India
- Language: Telugu

Marapurani Manishi (transl. Memorable Person) is a 1973 Indian Telugu-language drama film directed by T. Rama Rao. The film stars Akkineni Nageswara Rao and Manjula, with music composed by K. V. Mahadevan. It is a remake of the Malayalam film Odayil Ninnu (1965), which was adapted from the novel of the same name. Nageswara Rao won the Filmfare Award for Best Actor – Telugu for this film.

== Cast ==
- Akkineni Nageswara Rao as Abbi
- Manjula as Lakshmi
- S. V. Ranga Rao as Rangaiah
- Gummadi as Ananda Rao
- Jaggayya as Shankar
- Raja Babu as Delhi
- Nagabhushanam as Varaalu
- Chandra Mohan as Shekar
- Mada
- P. J. Sarma
- Kakarala
- Ch. Krishna Murthy
- Ananda Mohan as Ranga
- Chitti Babu as P. Pal
- Jayanthi as Parvathi
- Latha as Ammulu
- Roja Ramani as Middle age Ammulu
- Pushpa Kumari as Varaalu's wife
- Baby Sridevi as Young Ammulu

== Soundtrack ==
Music composed by K. V. Mahadevan.

S. No.	Song title	Lyrics	Singers	length
1	"Vacchindhi Vacchindhi"	C. Narayana Reddy	Ghantasala	4:09
2	"O Raamayyaa"	Acharya Aatreya	Ghantasala, P. Susheela	4:22
3	"Ekkado Ledule Devudu"	Acharya Aatreya	Ghantasala	4:01
4	"Evade Ee Pillagaadu"	C. Narayana Reddy	S. P. Balasubrahmanyam, P. Susheela	3:58
5	"Em Cheppanu"	C. Narayana Reddy	Ghantasala, P. Susheela	4:19
