= Lakshmi Movie Makers =

Indian film production and distribution company

- Type: Film production Film distribution
- Industry: Entertainment
- Founded: 1994
- Headquarters: Chennai, India
- Key people: K. Muralidharan; V. Swaminathan; G. Venugopal
- Products: Motion pictures (Tamil)

Lakshmi Movie Makers is an Indian film production and distribution company headed by K. Muralidharan, V. Swaminathan and G. Venugopal.

== History ==
Lakshmi Movie Makers' first film was Aranmanai Kaavalan (1994). The studio experienced significant success in the mid-1990s, with several projects such as Gokulathil Seethai (1996) and Unnidathil Ennai Koduthen (1998) becoming profitable. V. Swaminathan, one of the producers occasionally made cameo appearances in his productions.

Producer V. Swaminathan's son Ashwin Raja made his debut as an actor in Boss Engira Bhaskaran (2010) and has since appeared in comedy roles.

By the end of the 2010s, the studio remained largely inactive owing to the rising costs of operating in the Tamil film industry.

== Filmography ==
=== Films ===
Title	Year	Director	Cast	Synopsis	Ref.
Aranmanai Kaavalan	1994	Selva Vinayagam	Sarathkumar, Sivaranjani, Raghuvaran	A taxi driver is forced to go to his village to save the people from an evil landlord.	
Veluchami	1995	Arul	Sarathkumar, Vineetha	Veluchami faces a struggle to marry his lover.	
Mr. Madras	1995	P. Vasu	Prabhu, Sukanya, Vineetha	A model ends up becoming the bodyguard for a rich woman.	
Gokulathil Seethai	1996	Agathiyan	Karthik, Suvalakshmi, Karan	A rich man mends his womanizing ways after a girl enters his life.	
Dharma Chakkaram	1997	K. S. Ravikumar	Vijayakanth, Rambha, Deepti Bhatnagar	A respectable rich man in village clashes with a cruel landlord	
Ulavuthurai (distribution only)	1998	Ramesh Selvan	Vijayakanth, Meena	An ex naval officer whose wife was killed by terrorists returns to the Navy to solve a series of murders happening in the sea	
Priyamudan	1998	Vincent Selva	Vijay, Kausalya	A young man, who goes on to extreme lengths to achieve his goals, takes the identity of his friend to get his lover.	
Unnidathil Ennai Koduthen	1998	Vikraman	Karthik, Roja, Ajith Kumar	A small-time thief gets reformed by a girl and helps the same girl become a singer.	
Veeram Vilanja Mannu	1998	Kasthuri Raja	Vijayakanth, Khushbu, Roja	A villager is forced to become a bandit in the forest and his long-lost son grows up to be a cop assigned to arrest him.	
Unnai Thedi	1999	Sundar C	Ajith Kumar, Malavika, Swathi	A man who visits his friend's village discovers that he is related to his friend's family.	
Oruvan	1999	Suresh Krissna	Sarathkumar, Pooja Batra, Devayani	A fireman finds out that a dreaded criminal, who killed his family, is still alive.	
Unakkaga Ellam Unakkaga	1999	Sundar C	Karthik, Rambha	A spoiled, rich young man is forced into a marriage by his parents, but he is already in love with someone else.	
Unnaruge Naan Irundhal	1999	Selva	Parthiban, Meena, Rambha	A poor taxi driver helps a rich girl by paying off her debts.	
Kannan Varuvaan	2000	Sundar C	Karthik, Manthra, Divya Unni	A man is forced to take up the identity of the deceased person to make the family happy.	
Ullam Kollai Poguthae	2001	Sundar C	Prabhu Deva, Karthik, Anjala Zaveri	When his girl friend loses her eyesight after her fiancé dies in an accident, a man mimics his voice to make her believe he is alive.	
Dosth	2001	S. A. Chandrasekhar	Sarathkumar, Abhirami, Prakash Raj	A man who is accused of murdering his friend finds out he is part of a conspiracy.	
Unnai Ninaithu	2002	Vikraman	Suriya, Laila, Sneha	A man who gets cheated by his lover, meets her again and ends up helping her.	
Bagavathi	2002	A. Venkatesh	Vijay, Reemma Sen	A tea shop owner becomes a gangster after his younger brother gets murdered.	
Anbe Sivam	2003	Sundar C	Kamal Haasan, Madhavan, Kiran Rathod	Two different personalities meet together during a trip and face a lot of problems during their journey.	
Kangalal Kaidhu Sei	2004	Bharathiraja	Vaseegaran, Priyamani	A girl joins as a personal assistant to a rich man to expose his kleptomaniac ways.	
Daas	2005	Babu Yogeswaran	Jayam Ravi, Renuka Menon	A boy and a girl from different religions falls in love with each other.	
Oru Naal Oru Kanavu	2005	Fazil	Srikanth, Sonia Agarwal	A girl who plays pranks on a man ends up falling in love with him.	
Pudhupettai	2006	Selvaraghavan	Dhanush, Sonia Agarwal, Sneha	A simpleton who arrives in the city transforms into a gangster.	
Silambattam	2008	S. Saravanan	Silambarasan, Sana Khan, Sneha	A meek priest learns about his sad past and decides to avenge the death of his family.	
Aattanayagann	2010	Krishnaram	Shakthi, Remya Nambeesan, Adithya Menon	An unemployed man hides the fact from the family that his elder brother is a gangster.	
Sakalakala Vallavan	2015	Suraj	Jayam Ravi, Trisha, Anjali	A naive villager is forced to marry a city bred girl and both do not get along with each other.	
4 Idiots	TBA				

=== Television ===
Title	Year	Channel	Ref.
Rudhra	2025-present	Kalaignar TV	
