= Chemparathy =

- Poster designed by Bharathan
- Directed by: P. N. Menon
- Written by: Malayattoor Ramakrishnan
- Produced by: S. Krishnan Nair
- Starring: Madhu; Raghavan; Roja Ramani; Sudheer
- Cinematography: Ashok Kumar
- Edited by: Ravi Kiran
- Music by: Devarajan
- Production company: New India Films
- Distributed by: Thirumeni Pictures
- Release date: 7 July 1972
- Running time: 140 minutes
- Country: India
- Language: Malayalam

Chemparathy (transl. Hibiscus) is a 1972 Malayalam-language film directed by P. N. Menon and written by Malayattoor Ramakrishnan. It was produced by S. Krishnan Nair), a literary personality and the founder of Malayalanadu weekly. It stars Madhu along with newcomers Roja Ramani, Raghavan and Sudheer in major roles. The film was an adaptation of Malayattoor's short story Lodge. Noted filmmaker Bharathan made his cinematic debut as an art director in the film.

The film became a critical and commercial success. It won two awards at the Filmfare Awards South for Best Film - Malayalam and Best Actress - Malayalam. The film also won one Kerala State Film Award for Second Best Film. The film was remade in Tamil as Paruva Kaalam in 1974 with Roja Ramani repeating her role and Kamal Haasan playing the male lead and also in Telugu as Kanne Vayasu.

== Plot ==
Santha is a cheerful girl who is working in a lodge as a sweeper. She is favourite to everyone in the lodge. Dinesh is in love with this girl. But one day Santha is found dead in the nearby well. Police start an investigation and at first arrest Balachandran as a suspect. But later Dinesh confesses to the police that Rajappan, a rich guy living in this same lodge, is the reason for Santha's death. Rajappan raped Santha and when she became pregnant he killed her. After Santha's death her memories haunt Dinesh and he kills Rajappan and surrenders to police.

== Cast ==
- Madhu as Balachandran
- Raghavan as Dinesh
- Roja Ramani as Santha
- Sudheer as Rajappan
- Kottarakkara Sreedharan Nair as Sankaran
- Rani Chandra
- Adoor Bhavani as Santha's mother
- Sankaradi
- Adoor Bhasi as Bhasi
- Bahadoor
- Kuthiravattom Pappu
- Paravoor Bharathan
- Balan K. Nair
- Janardhanan
- Radhamani
- Sudharma
- Pathma
- P. O. Thomas
- Pathiyil Madhavan (guest)
- Vaidyar K. R. Velappan Pillai

== Soundtrack ==
All lyrics are written by Vayalar Ramavarma; all music is composed by G. Devarajan.

No.	Title	Artist(s)	Length
1.	"Chakravarthini Ninakku"	K. J. Yesudas
2.	"Chakravarthini Ninakku"	P. Madhuri
3.	"Sharanamayyappaa Swamee"	K. J. Yesudas
4.	"Kunukkitta Kozhi"	P. Madhuri
5.	"Ambaadi Thannilorunni"	P. Madhuri
6.	"Poove Polipoove"	P. Madhuri, Chorus
7.	"Chakravarthini Ninakku" (Bit)	P. Madhuri
8.	"Ambaadi Thannilorunni" (Pathos)	P. Madhuri

== Awards ==
=== Filmfare Awards South ===
- Best Film - Malayalam - S. K. Nair
- Best Actress - Malayalam - Roja Ramani, before the film released her screen name was Shobhana.

=== Kerala State Film Awards ===
- Second Best Film - S. K. Nair and P. N. Menon
