= Ketu Duplicate =

1995 Indian film directed by Relangi Narasimha Rao

Ketu Duplicatu
- Movie Poster
- Directed by: Relangi Narasimha Rao
- Written by: Shankaramanchi Pardhsaradhi (dialogues)
- Screenplay by: Relangi Narasimha Rao
- Story by: G. S. Rama Rao
- Produced by: K. C. Reddy
- Starring: Rajendra Prasad; Surabhi
- Cinematography: M. Nagendra Kumar
- Edited by: G. Krishnam Raju
- Music by: Koti
- Production company: Sri Rajeeva Productions
- Release date: 1995
- Running time: 142 mins
- Country: India
- Language: Telugu

Ketu Duplicatu is a 1995 Telugu-language comedy film, produced by K. C. Reddy for Sri Rajeeva Productions and directed by Relangi Narasimha Rao. It stars Rajendra Prasad and Surabhi, with music composed by Koti. The film was a success at the box office.

== Cast ==
- Rajendra Prasad as Vijay
- Surabhi as Usha
- Satyanayana as Raghavaiah
- Brahmanandam as Hareram
- A.V.S as Rama Swamy
- Mallikarjuna Rao as Shankar Rao
- Subhalekha Sudhakar as Vijay's friend
- Suthi Velu as Dharmalingam
- Sivaji Raja as Ajay
- Chitti Babu as Vijay's friend
- Kallu Chidambaram as Thukaram
- Krishna Chaitanya as Inspector
- Gadiraju Subba Rao as Vijay's henchmen
- Annapurna as Parvati
- Harika as Rita

== Soundtrack ==
Ketu Duplicatu

Film score by Koti
- Released: 1995
- Genre: Soundtrack
- Length: 24:54
- Label: Supreme Music
- Producer: Koti

Koti chronology
Telugu Veera Levara (1995)	Ketu Duplicatu (1995)	Peddarayudu (1995)

Music composed by Koti. Music released on Supreme Music Company.

No.	Title	Lyrics	Singer(s)	Length
1.	"Kudi Yedamala"	Veturi	S. P. Balasubrahmanyam, Radhika	4:50
2.	"Musi Musi Navvulu"	Bhuvana Chandra	S. P. Balasubrahmanyam, Radhika	4:53
3.	"Nee Kosam Prathi"	Sirivennela	S. P. Balasubrahmanyam, Sujatha	4:51
4.	"Vachinarandi Pellivaaru"	Sirivennela	S. P. Balasubrahmanyam, Radhika, Ramani	5:04
5.	"O Lady Papa"	Veturi	S. P. Balasubrahmanyam, Radhika	5:16
Total length:				24:54
