= Hello Daddy =

- VCD cover
- Directed by: Naganna
- Written by: Parashree Ravi Srivatsa (Dialogues)
- Story by: Srinivas Babu
- Produced by: Raju
- Starring: Vishnuvardhan; Sonakshi; Surabhi
- Cinematography: J.G. Krishna
- Edited by: Suresh Urs
- Music by: Hamsalekha
- Production company: Sri Lalitha Commercials
- Release date: 1996
- Running time: 144 minutes
- Country: India
- Language: Kannada

Hello Daddy is a 1996 Indian Kannada-language fantasy comedy film directed by Naganna and produced by Raju. The film stars Vishnuvardhan, Sonakshi and Surabhi. The film was widely popular for the songs composed by Hamsalekha upon release.

== Plot ==
Prakash, a widower, is a government official responsible for confiscating lands acquired by criminals illegally. His son wants him to get his life on track and tries to find a suitor. The criminals want to take revenge on Prakash for ruining their plan, and for that they employ an evil sorcerer to cast a spell on him. The sorcerer ends up interchanging the souls of Prakash and his son resulting in Prakash behaving like his son and vice versa.

== Cast ==
- Vishnuvardhan as Prakash
- Sonakshi as Prakash's deceased wife
- Surabhi as Surabhi
- Vaishali Kasaravalli as Surabhi's grandmother
- Vimala
- Sudheer
- Lohithaswa
- Master Nithin as Arun
- Sanjana
- Mandeep Roy
- Biradar
- Arjun as Jijo

== Soundtrack ==
The music of the film was composed and lyrics written by Hamsalekha. The audio was released by Anand Audio company.

Track listing
No.	Title	Lyrics	Singer(s)	Length
1.	"Ee Kalpane Manava Kalpane"	Hamsalekha	S. P. Balasubrahmanyam, K. S. Chithra	04:49
2.	"Bandhana Baalige"	Hamsalekha	S. P. Balasubrahmanyam	04:46
3.	"Shalege Ee Dina Raja"	Hamsalekha	S. P. Balasubrahmanyam, Monica Dutt	04:33
4.	"Baligobbale Hendthi"	Hamsalekha	S. P. Balasubrahmanyam, K. S. Chithra	04:43
5.	"Surabhi Surabhi"	Hamsalekha	S. P. Balasubrahmanyam, Suma Shastry	04:31
