= Odayil Ninnu =

Malayalam novel

- Author: P. Kesavadev
- Language: Malayalam
- Genre: Literature Novel
- Publication date: 1942
- Publication place: India
- ISBN: 817180134X

Odayil Ninnu (From the Gutter) is a Malayalam novel written by Indian author P. Kesavadev in 1942. The protagonist of the novel is a rickshaw-puller named Pappu. The novel is one of Kesavadev's best-known works. With the appearance of the novel in 1942 began the publication of a series of high-quality novels in Malayalam.

== Main character ==
Pappu, the protagonist, is a real rebel and influencer who always fights for equality and justice. He has fought against landlordism since childhood.

== Film adaptations ==
- Odayil Ninnu (Malayalam, 1965): Directed by K. S. Sethumadhavan from a screenplay by P. Kesavadev.
- Babu (Tamil, 1971): Directed by A. C. Trilokchandar.
- Marapurani Manishi (Telugu, 1973): Directed by T. Rama Rao
- Babu (Hindi, 1985): Directed by A. C. Trilokchandar.
