= Gayathri (1973 film) =

- Directed by: P. N. Menon
- Written by: Malayattoor Ramakrishnan
- Screenplay by: Malayattoor Ramakrishnan
- Starring: Jayabharathi; Raghavan; MG Soman; Shubha
- Cinematography: Ashok Kumar
- Edited by: Ravi
- Music by: G. Devarajan
- Production company: Sreeram Pictures
- Distributed by: Thirumeni Pictures
- Release date: 14 March 1973
- Country: India
- Language: Malayalam

Gayathri is a 1973 Indian Malayalam-language film directed by P. N. Menon. The film stars Jayabharathi, Raghavan, MG Soman and Shubha in the lead roles. The film has musical score by G. Devarajan. M. G. Soman made his debut in the film.

== Cast ==
- Raghavan
- M. G. Soman
- Jayabharathi
- Adoor Bhasi
- Sankaradi
- Shubha
- Bahadoor
- Kottarakkara Sreedharan Nair
- Roja Ramani
- Janardhanan

== Soundtrack ==
All lyrics are written by Vayalar Ramavarma; all music is composed by G. Devarajan.

Track listing
No.	Title	Artist(s)	Length
1.	"Padmatheerthame Unaroo"	K. J. Yesudas, Choir
2.	"Sreevallabha Sreevalsaankitha"	P. Madhuri
3.	"Thankathalikayil Pongalumaay Vanna"	K. J. Yesudas
4.	"Thirakal Thirakal"	K. J. Yesudas, Choir
5.	"Thrithaapoovukal"	P. Madhuri
