= M. Dharmaraju M.A. =

1994 Indian Telugu film

- DVD cover
- Directed by: Ravi Raja Pinisetty
- Screenplay by: Ravi Raja Pinisetty
- Story by: Manivannan
- Based on: Amaidhi Padai (Tamil)(1994) by Manivannan
- Produced by: Jonnada Ramana Murthy; G. K. Reddy (Presenter)
- Starring: Mohan Babu; Rambha; Surabhi; Satyanarayana; Sujatha
- Cinematography: K. S. Prakash
- Edited by: Siva - Krishnamurthy
- Music by: Raj–Koti
- Production company: Sri Ravicharan Combines
- Release date: 25 July 1994
- Country: India
- Language: Telugu

M. Dharmaraju M.A. is a 1994 Indian Telugu-language political drama film directed by Ravi Raja Pinisetty. Produced by Jonnada Ramana Murthy, the film features Mohan Babu in a dual role, including the title character, M. Dharmaraju. The supporting cast includes Rambha, Surabhi, Satyanarayana and Sujatha. The music was composed by Raj–Koti. The film is a remake of the 1994 Tamil film Amaidhi Padai.

Mohan Babu's performance as the titular character was widely acclaimed. The film also marked the acting debut of M. S. Narayana, who later became one of Telugu cinema's most celebrated comedians.

== Plot ==
The film follows the rise of M. Dharmaraju, a shrewd man who transitions from a lazy individual to a powerful, corrupt politician. Initially assisting a politician (Satyanarayana), he wins a legislative seat and becomes increasingly arrogant and ruthless. Dharmaraju's son, Satyam, raised unknowingly about his father's deeds, seeks revenge upon discovering the truth about Dharmaraju's past. As Dharmaraju's corrupt actions intensify, Satyam, now a police officer, challenges him, ultimately confronting his father and ending his reign by killing him.

== Cast ==
- Mohan Babu as M. Dharmaraju and Satyam (dual role)
- Rambha as Seetha
- Surabhi as Thulasi
- Kaikala Satyanarayana
- Sujatha
- Annapurna
- Sri Lakshmi
- Saraswati
- Anuja
- Baby Sudeepa
- Mallikarjuna Rao
- Rallapalli
- P. L. Narayana
- Sakshi Ranga Rao
- Nalinikanth
- M. V. S. Haranatha Rao
- Potti Prasad
- Kota Sankara Rao
- M. S. Narayana (debut)
- Ironleg Sastri
- Raghunatha Reddy
- Juttu Narasimham

== Production ==
Ravi Raja Pinisetty forced me to play a small role in M. Dharmaraju M.A. against my wishes. He firmly believed I had great potential as an actor, and because of him, I am now successful. Sometimes, life forces you to change direction against your will, but it will be beneficial in the long run.

— M. S. Narayana

M. Dharmaraju M.A. was directed by Ravi Raja Pinisetty, who also wrote the screenplay. The film is a remake of the 1994 Tamil film Amaidhipadai. It was produced by Jonnada Ramana Murthy and presented by G. K. Reddy, the father of actor Vishal. M. V. S. Haranatha Rao, who appeared in a supporting role, wrote the dialogues for the film.

M. S. Narayana, initially a writer, contributed to the comedy track in the film. Director Ravi Raja Pinisetty, seeking an actor with a distinct appearance described as "Dosakai Mokham" (cucumber face), cast Narayana, who was then working as a writer, after an assistant suggested his name. Although hesitant to act, Narayana accepted the role following Pinisetty's encouragement. This marked his acting debut and became a defining moment, leading to his rise as one of Telugu cinema's most celebrated comedians.

== Music ==
M. Dharmaraju M.A.

Soundtrack album by Raj–Koti
- Released: 1994
- Recorded: 1994
- Genre: Feature film soundtrack
- Length: 24:00
- Label: Aditya Music
- Producer: Raj–Koti

The music for M. Dharmaraju M.A. was composed by Raj–Koti, with lyrics written by Sirivennela Seetharama Sastry. Audio soundtrack was released on Aditya Music label.

Track list
No.	Title	Lyrics	Singer(s)	Length
1.	"Em Papa"	Sirivennela Seetharama Sastry	S. P. Balasubrahmanyam, K. S. Chithra	03:56
2.	"Varevva Varahala"	Sirivennela Seetharama Sastry	Mano, K. S. Chithra	04:46
3.	"Erra Errani Kurradhana"	Sirivennela Seetharama Sastry	S. P. Balasubrahmanyam, K. S. Chithra	04:41
4.	"Oppuko Sundari"	Sirivennela Seetharama Sastry	Mano	05:01
5.	"Sarasakura Dora"	Sirivennela Seetharama Sastry	S. P. Balasubrahmanyam, Malgudi Subha	05:36
Total length:				24:00

== Reception ==
M. Dharmaraju M.A. was released on 11 November 1994. Mohan Babu's performance as the title character received praise for his portrayal. However, the film failed at the box office.
