= Aayiram Vaasal Idhayam =

- Theatrical release poster
- Directed by: A. Jagannathan
- Story by: Thamarai Manalan
- Produced by: V. S. Durai
- Starring: Sudhakar Radhika Roja Ramani Vadivukkarasi
- Cinematography: H. S. Venu
- Edited by: K. Govindsamy
- Music by: Ilaiyaraaja
- Production company: Selvam Arts
- Release date: 12 January 1980
- Country: India
- Language: Tamil

Aayiram Vaasal Idhayam (transl. A heart with a thousand entrances) is a 1980 Indian Tamil-language film directed by A. Jagannathan and produced by Selvam Arts. It stars Sudhakar, Radhika, Roja Ramani and Vadivukkarasi, and was released on 12 January 1980.

== Plot ==
A man named Senthil embarks on an emotional adventure involving several men and women.

== Cast ==
- Sudhakar as Senthil
- Radhika as Neelu
- Roja Ramani as Vijaya
- Vadivukkarasi as Gandhimathi
- Major Sundarrajan
- Thengai Srinivasan
- Senthamarai
- M. N. Rajam
- C. Vasantha
- Sachu

== Soundtrack ==
The soundtrack was composed by Ilaiyaraaja.

Track listing
No.	Title	Lyrics	Singer(s)	Length
1.	"Jaipen Jaipen"	Kannadasan	Sasirekha, Vani Jairam
2.	"Hey En Aasa"	Gangai Amaran	Malaysia Vasudevan, S. P. Sailaja
3.	"Maharani Unnai Thedi"	Pulamaipithan	S. Janaki, P. Jayachandran
4.	"Kichu Kichu"	Kannadasan	S. Janaki

== Critical reception ==
Kousigan of Kalki appreciated Roja Ramani's performance, Ilaiyaraaja's music and the cinematography.
