= Paruva Kaalam =

- Title card
- Directed by: Jos A.N. Fernando
- Story by: A. S. Prakasam
- Produced by: Sekhar Raja
- Starring: Roja Ramani; Srikanth; Kamal Haasan; Nagesh; Prameela
- Cinematography: Masthan
- Edited by: K. R. Ramalingam
- Music by: G. Devarajan
- Production company: Jupiter Art Movies
- Release date: 9 February 1974
- Country: India
- Language: Tamil

Paruva Kaalam (transl. Season period) is a 1974 Indian Tamil-language film, directed by Jos A. N. Fernando, written by A. S. Prakasam, starring Srikanth, Roja Ramani, Kamal Haasan, Nagesh and Prameela. Roja Ramani paired up with Kamal Haasan for the first time. It is a remake of the 1972 Malayalam-language film Chemparathy.

== Plot ==
Paruva Kaalam is the story of an innocent girl who gets raped. The film is the journey to bring the culprit to justice.

== Cast ==
- Roja Ramani as Shantha
- Srikanth as Gangadharan
- Prameela as Kanaga
- Kamal Haasan as Chandran
- Nagesh as Swamy Kamalanandham
- S. V. Subbaiah as Periyasamy
- Leo Prabu as Johnny
- Sudharsan as Ravi
- Sasikumar as Jambo
- Suruli Rajan as Murugan
- Sachu as Pappamma

== Production ==
Paruva Kaalam was produced by Jupiter Art Movies. It was shot in black-and-white. The film was given a "U" (Unrestricted) certificate by the Central Board of Film Certification with no cuts. The final length of the film was 3,867.00 metres (12,687.01 ft).

== Soundtrack ==
The soundtrack was composed by G. Devarajan, with lyrics written by Pulamaipithan and Poovai Senguttavan.

Track listing
No.	Title	Singer(s)	Length
1.	"Velli Rathangal"	P. Madhuri
2.	"Velvettu Pattu"	L. R. Eswari
3.	"Saranam Iyyappa"	Rajesh
4.	"Velli Rathangal" (sad)	P. Madhuri

== Release and reception ==
Paruva Kaalam was released on 9 February 1974. Kanthan of Kalki praised the performances of certain actors.
