= Kathirukka Neramillai =

1993 film by Kalia Kulothungan

- Title card
- Directed by: Kulothungan
- Written by: P. Kalaimani (dialogues)
- Screenplay by: Kulothungan
- Story by: Ganesh Muthulingham
- Produced by: S. Kannan; Hithesh Jabhak; Lalitha Sivalingam
- Starring: Karthik; Sivaranjani; Khushbu
- Cinematography: Abdul Rahman
- Edited by: B. Lenin; V. T. Vijayan
- Music by: Ilaiyaraaja
- Production company: Mass Media International
- Release date: 3 December 1993
- Running time: 140 minutes
- Country: India
- Language: Tamil

Kaathirukka Neramillai (transl. No time to wait) is a 1993 Indian Tamil language action thriller film directed by Kulothungan, starring Karthik, Sivaranjani and Khushbu.

== Plot ==
Raju and his sidekicks stole black money to help an orphanage. D.I.G. Mohanraj knew that they were the thieves, but he was unable to send them in jail. Raju and Radhika, Mohanraj's daughter, fell in love. Her father refused to accept it, so he arranged a marriage with Ajith, a police officer. Raju became drunk and killed Ajith. When Mohanraj came back to his car, he found Raju drunk at the backseat. Raju's lookalike said his flashback. His name was Somasekhar, and he fell in love with Bhavani and married her. She worked at Chatterjee's ganja estate. Chatterjee wanted Somasekhar's estate, but the latter did not want to sell it to a criminal. Chatterjee's henchmen killed Bhavani, who gave birth to a girl. Somasekhar, wounded, could not do anything. A few years later, Ajith kidnapped his daughter. Somasekhar, after telling the flashback, reveals to Raju that he still will kill two people as Raju. Somasekhar went to his daughter's nanny's home, who also worked for Chatterjee, as she and Raju asked him to be Somasekhar for some days. Raju's lover and friends came to see him, but Somasekhar advised them to go to a place, so they went there, and Somasekhar's friend kidnapped them like Raju. Finally, they managed to escape. Somasekhar found where his child was kidnapped. Chatterjee caught Raju and Somasekhar. Somasekhar revealed that he gave his property and his daughter to Raju. Somasekhar killed Chatterjee and died.

== Cast ==
- Karthik as Raju and Somasekar
- Sivaranjani as Radhika
- Khushbu as Bhavani
- Nassar as Chatterjee
- Rajesh as D.I.G. Mohanraj
- Chinni Jayanth as Raju's friend
- Vadivelu as Raju's friend
- Thyagu as Raju's friend
- Uday Prakash as Ajith

== Production ==
Kaathirukka Neramillai was the directorial debut of Kulothungan. The film's story was written by Karthik's brother Ganesh.

== Soundtrack ==
The soundtrack was composed by Ilaiyaraaja.

Song	Singer(s)	Lyrics	Duration
"Va Kathirukka Neramillai"	S. P. Balasubrahmanyam, S. Janaki	Vaali	5:03
"Kaatiloru Kaadaikku"	Mano, S. N. Surendar, Sundarrajan	Vaali	4:44
"Thuliyo Thuli"	K. S. Chithra	Vaali	4:52
"Nilava Nilava"	Mano, Minmini	Pulamaipithan	4:59
"Kasturi Mane Mane"	Ilaiyaraaja	Pulamaipithan	2:42
"Machi Machi"	Mano, S. N. Surendar, Sundarrajan	Pulamaipithan	4:58

== Reception ==
The Indian Express wrote, "What begins as an average film soon turns into a fairly engaging one mainly due to the neat screenplay in the second half and absence of the boring moments". New Straits Times wrote "Though it is reminiscent of Gentleman, the first half was at least easy to sit through with its light humour [..] The second half gets too serious and it is like sitting through another of those movies we have seen so often of the bad guys chasing the good guys".
