= Malamukalile Daivam =

Malamukalile Daivam (The God Atop the Hill)
- The cover of the screenplay published by D. C. Books
- Directed by: P. N. Menon
- Written by: Kalpatta Balakrishnan
- Starring: Gabriel; Suresh; Sudharani; Kunjandi; Bala Singh; Lakshmi Subramanian; Unni Mary; Sathindran; Ranjith Kumar
- Cinematography: Deviprasad
- Edited by: Sasi
- Music by: Johnson
- Production company: Suriamudra Films
- Release date: 11 February 1983
- Running time: 115 minutes
- Country: India
- Language: Malayalam

Malamukalile Daivam (The God Atop the Hill) is a 1983 Malayalam film directed by P. N. Menon. The film is set in a tribal village in Kerala where religious superstition and ignorance reign supreme. A relatively intelligent boy escapes its oppressive confines and later returns, determined to bring enlightenment to the village. Gabriel, Suresh, Sudharani, Kunjandi, Bala Singh, Lakshmi Subramanian, Unni Mary, Sathindran and Ranjith Kumar form the cast. Several critics consider the film as the most outstanding piece in Menon's filmography. The film won the National Film Awards for Best Regional Film and Best Child Artist (Suresh).

== Cast ==
- Archana as Marie
- Gabriel as Ramachandran
- Master Suresh as Kayama, younger Ramachandran
- Sudharani as Sujatha
- Kunjandi as Nambi
- Bala Singh as the landlord
- Sathindran as Nenchan
- Ranjith Kumar as Kayama, Marie's son
- Lakshmi Subramanian
- PR Menon as Madhavan Master
- Rani Abraham
