= Thanga Manasukkaran =

- Poster
- Directed by: Rajavarman
- Written by: Rajavarman
- Produced by: R. Dhanabhalan
- Starring: Murali; Sivaranjani
- Cinematography: G. Rajendran
- Edited by: M. Ganesan
- Music by: Ilaiyaraaja
- Production company: Yaghava Productions
- Release date: 20 March 1992
- Running time: 120 minutes
- Country: India
- Language: Tamil

Thanga Manasukkaran (transl. The man with a golden heart) is a 1992 Indian Tamil-language romantic drama film, directed by Rajavarman in his debut. The film stars Murali and Sivaranjani, with Goundamani and Senthil in supporting roles. It was released on 20 March 1992.

== Plot ==
Murugesh, also known as Murugan, is a musician. He comes with his troupe into a village and is assigned to play from Aadi, the fourth month of the Tamil calendar, till the conclusion of the Village festival. The village head's daughter Chellakili waits for her lover Murugan, who was missing, while her cousin Duraipandi, a brute, wants to marry her. Chellakili is curious about a song from her childhood sung by Murugesh. Meanwhile, a guitarist in the same music band as Murugesh falls in love with a Karakattam dancer in the village, while Sundal, another guitarist, helps him.

Murugesh finally reveals to Chellakili that he is her long-lost lover and cousin Murugan and also discloses the reason behind his disappearance. In the past, Chellakili's father wanted his daughter to marry his nephew and orphan Murugan. However, Yasodai, Chellakili's aunt, wanted Chellakili to marry Duraipandi, her son. She managed to beat Murugan, and she expelled him from the village. Later, Murugan became a singer in a music band, and he still pines for Chellakili.

Duraipandi tries to kill Murugan through a crude bomb and fails. Over time, Duraipandi and Yasodai learn of Murugan's identity and romance. They then reveal Chellakili's love affair to her father without disclosing Murugesh's real identity. Her family then meets the Sadha Swamy, who causes Chellakili to forget her love through black magic. Now, Chellakili rejects Murugan's love and forgets him. What transpires later forms the crux of the story.

== Cast ==
- Murali as Murugesh (Murugan)
- Sivaranjani as Chellakili
- Vijayakumar as Chellakili's father
- Goundamani as Guitarist in Murugan's troupe
- Senthil as Sundal
- G. M. Sundar as Duraipandi
- C. R. Saraswathi as Yasodai
- M. N. Nambiar as Sadha Swamy
- S. N. Lakshmi as Chellakili's grandmother
- Bayilvan Ranganathan as Mookkamma's father
- Sharmili as Mookkamma
- Kullamani
- Ramesh Kumar
- Ranjith
- Sahadevan
- Mahadevan

== Production ==
Rajavarman who earlier worked as story writer and associate director for films like Enga Ooru Kavakkaran and Paandi Nattu Thangam made his directorial debut with this film.

== Soundtrack ==
The music was composed by Ilaiyaraaja.

Song	Singer(s)	Lyrics	Duration
"Manikuyil Isaikkuthadi"	Mano	Piraisoodan	5:04
"Manikuyil"	B. S. Sasirekha, Minmini	Piraisoodan	3:15
"Maaney Mayanguvathu"	Mano	Piraisoodan	5:03
"Paatukulle Pattu"	Mano, S. Janaki	Kamakodiyan	4:55
"Poothathu Poonthoppu"	S. Janaki, Mano	Gangai Amaran	4:49
"Udakkachatham"	Mano	Gangai Amaran	5:51

== Release and reception ==
C. R. K. of Kalki wrote that Thanga Manasukaran once again confirms how severe the story shortage is in Tamil cinema. The film did well at box-office and Rajavarman went on to collaborate again with Murali for two other films: Manikuyil and Thangakkili, both in 1993.
