= Thalattu =

1993 Tamil film

- Poster
- Directed by: T. K. Rajendran
- Written by: T. K. Rajendran
- Produced by: P. Mohanraj; P. Dhanraj
- Starring: Arvind Swamy; Sukanya; Sivaranjini
- Cinematography: B. R. Vijayalakshmi
- Edited by: M. N. Raja
- Music by: Ilaiyaraaja
- Production company: Kiran Films
- Release date: 20 August 1993
- Country: India
- Language: Tamil

Thalattu (Tamil pronunciation: [taːlaːʈːɯ] transl. Lullaby) is a 1993 Indian Tamil-language drama film written and directed by T. K. Rajendran. The film stars Arvind Swamy, Sukanya and Sivaranjini, while Goundamani, Senthil, Vijayakumar and Kovai Sarala play other supporting roles. It was released on 20 August 1993.

== Plot ==
The story starts with a carefree young woman "Revathi" (played by Sukanya) stumbling upon a village called "Poombarai" (based in the Coimbatore area of TN). Upon arriving, she meets various locals such as Chelladurai (played by Mansoor Ali Khan), Goundar and wife (played by both Koundamani and Kovai Sarala respectively); she eventually befriends a young man locally known as "kuzhanthai" (means "child" in Tamil), played by Aravind Swamy. Kuzhanthai introduces her to the local "Vaidyan" (played by Vinu Chakravarthy) and his wife (played by Kamala Kamesh); they like Revathi and let her stay at one of their properties next his elder sister known as "Periya Aathaa" (played by Kanthimathi), in which she and Vaidyan have an estranged relationship. One day, Revathi had a playful interaction with a village child, but during that play the child fell down and had undergone a seizure; Revathi immediately runs back home to get medicine (syringe) to inject and stabilize the child, however, the Vaidyan was already there and wouldn't allow her to do so, since the Vaidyan practices the ancient local form of medicine; in this scene, Revathi is revealed to be an actual medical doctor. The Vaidyan's method was no good and eventually the child passes. The incident triggers memories of Dr. Revathi's past with scenes of her family (it's not revealed anything about them as yet). As the story goes on, it introduces both "Malli" (played by Sivaranjini) and "Gayathri" (played by ?); Malli is the Vaidyan's daughter and Gayathri is the daughter of the local temple priest "Gurukkal" (played by Ra. Sankaran). Malli has a love interest in Kuzhanthai and desires him and him only. Eventually Dr. Revathi learns through Periya Aathaa that kuzhanthai is actually an orphan that was found by her. Kuzhanthai and Dr. Revathi (now called locally as "Dr. Amma") develop a special relationship between one another; some of the locals misunderstand it as a love relationship, but it turns out to be deeper than that over time. Chelladurai is the local rich man and also a money lender to the local villagers; he eventually loans money to Gurukkal for Gayathri's marriage, but Chelladurai has a lustful eye for Gayathri. One day, a marriage proposal came for Malli, but she wasn't in support of it and was distraught, since her desire was kuzhanthai; during the proposal, she sets her saree on fire, causing a panic in the house. The prospective family cancelled the proposal as they thought it was a bad omen that her saree was caught on fire. Malli's mother asked her why she did this and Malli reveals that she doesn't want any other man other than kuzhanthai, which shocks her mom. One night, Chelladurai was coming back from somewhere while riding his bullock cart; visibly drunk, he passes by a home seeing a flame lit lamp on the window sill, as he desired to light up a cigarette. Upon doing so, he saw Gayathri sleeping and burst into her home; Gurukkal was not there at the moment and Chelladurai took the opportunity to sexually assault Gayathri. As Chelladurai was leaving her home, Dr. Amma, kuzhanthai, villager (played by Kumarimuthu) and his wife saw him leaving and were wondering what he was doing there. As they stumbled upon Gayathri's home, Dr. Amma looked in the window and saw Gayathri trying to hang herself, but kuzhanthai managed to break inside and save her. The next day, Dr. Amma files a complaint to the village "panchayath" (in which the Vaidyan and a few elders are the heads). The village gathers and Chelladurai is compelled to explain his actions; Chelladurai asks for a witness to the incident and eventually the villager (played by Kumarimuthu) tells what what happened. Chelladurai is given 2 options, either tie the nuptial knot ("thalee") around Gayathri's neck and make her his wife, or face getting arrested and jail time for the crime he committed. Reluctantly, Chelladurai ties the knot. One evening, kuzhanthai was heading to Dr. Amma's home to drop off something and he ran into Chelladurai's friends; they were drinking alcohol and smoking. Kuzhanthai sneezed and they connvinced him to drink strong alcohol as a "medicine" to help him, not knowing what it would to do him. Kuzhanthai now drunk, stumbles to Dr. Amma's house and Dr. Amma realizes that he was tricked into drinking alcohol. She has him go inside to lie down and sleep it off. In the meantime, Chelladurai and friends rallied the local villagers to Dr. Amma's house and somehow convinced everyone that she slept with him; Chelladurai did this as a revenge against Dr. Amma. The Vaidyan gave her a verdict that she must vacate the home and leave the village by the end of the week. Distraught, Malli was heartbroken and was pleading to Dr. Amma about why she went after kuzhanthai (which was not the case). Despite the false allegations, Dr. Amma didn't really defend herself and agreed to leave. Before leaving, she went to see the Vaidyan and revealed to him that Malli is in love with kuzhanthai and to please have their marriage arranged; in the midst of that, they receive word that Malli ingested some poison (attempting suicide) and is at Periya Aathaa's home. Vaidyan is distraught and reluctant to go in, but Dr. Amma comes and goes inside with her medical kit. Dr. Amma saves Malli, but Malli is still upset. Dr. Amma tells her that she knows very well about her love for kuzhanthai and desires to see Malli and him married; Dr. Amma then says she will take leave, but before that, Periya Aathaa asks her who she really is. Finally, Dr. Amma tells everyone about her past; she came from an affluent family in Chennai and became a doctor there. One day, on the way to a proposal, her family met with a deadly accident in which only she was the survivor. Extended relatives didn't care much and only were after the properties of the now deceased family members. Revathi told the doctor to let everyone know that nobody survived, including her; seeing the greed of the family members, the doctor understood why she told him that. Dr. Amma suffered a major head injury and the doctor told her that there was a blood clot issue within the brain, in which only a risky major surgery would be the remedy. She declined and decided to live her last days as a terminal patient, hence her leaving Chennai and traveling somewhere, eventually ending up in Poombarai. Now that the truth is revealed, everyone is distraught. As kuzhanthai finally wakes up, Chelladurai's goons won't allow him to leave and reveal to him the "story" they made up. This riles up kuzhanthai and he brawls with Chelladurai's friends. While all this is happening, Dr. Amma is starting to succumb to her head injury as she is starting to pack. Malli comes to find out about this and alerts Periya Aathaa in a frantic hurry. After beating down the goons, Periya Aathaa and Malli tell kuzhanthai to immediately see Dr. Amma as she's succumbing to her fate. Heading to Dr. Amma's, kuzhanthai runs into Chelladurai and they both fight; eventually kuzhanthai beats him down, sparing his life. Kuzhanthai comes to Dr. Amma's home (while all the villagers rush towards there as well); he frantically calls her, but she doesn't answer. Kuzhanthai proceeds to break down the front door, but immediately before that, the door opens and Dr. Amma is standing there wearing the saree of his mother. In deep shock of emotion, Periya Aathaa tells kuzhanthai that this is exactly how she remembered his mother. It was then everyone understood the relationship with kuzhanthai and Dr. Amma, that despite their closeness in age, she was more of a "mother" to him instead of a love interest. After the overwhelming emotion of happiness, it turns to despair as Dr. Amma collapses and kuzhanthai catches her; she gives a final smile before dying.

== Cast ==
- Arvind Swamy as Kuzhanthai
- Sukanya as Dr. Revathi aka "Dr. Amma".
- Sivaranjini as Malli
- Goundamani as Goundar
- Senthil as Goundar's brother-in-law
- Vijayakumar as Dr. Revathi's father
- Kovai Sarala as Goundar's wife
- Mansoor Ali Khan as Chelladurai
- Ra. Sankaran as Gurukkal
- Poornam Viswanathan as Dr. Revathi's grandfather
- Vinu Chakravarthy as the local Vaidyan and Malli's father
- Kamala Kamesh as Vaidyan's wife
- Gandhimathi as Periya Aathaa, Vaidyan's older estranged sister
- Suryakanth as Kathavarayan, one of Chelladurai's goons

== Soundtrack ==
The music was composed by Ilaiyaraaja and the lyrics were by Pulamaipithan.

Song	Singers	Length
"Enakena Oruvarum"	Ilaiyaraaja	05:42
"Kulandhai Paadura"	Malaysia Vasudevan	05:05
"Methuva Thanthi"	Mano, Minmini	05:01
"Aatha sonnathappadi"	Malaysia Vasudevan	01:30
"Pannapura"	Malaysia Vasudevan	04:52
"Ennodu Potti"	Mano, S. N. Surendar, Minmini	05:39

== Reception ==
Malini Mannath of The Indian Express wrote, "Thalattu is fairly watchable though it takes its own time to tell the story. [..] It is slow-paced but soothing melody".
