= Odayil Ninnu (film) =

1965 Indian Malayalam drama film

- Directed by: K. S. Sethumadhavan
- Written by: P. Kesavadev
- Based on: Odayil Ninnu by P. Kesavadev
- Produced by: P. Ramaswami
- Starring: Sathyan; Prem Nazir; Kalaikkal Kumaran; K. R. Vijaya; Kaviyoor Ponnamma
- Cinematography: P. Ramaswami
- Music by: Devarajan
- Production company: Thirumurukan Pictures
- Distributed by: Thirumeni Release
- Release date: 5 March 1965
- Country: India
- Language: Malayalam

Odayil Ninnu (transl. From the Gutter) is a 1965 Indian Malayalam-language drama film directed by K. S. Sethumadhavan and written by P. Kesavadev, based on his novel of the same name. The film deals with the life and struggles of a proud and hardworking rickshaw puller, Pappu. It stars Sathyan, Prem Nazir, K. R. Vijaya, and Kaviyoor Ponnamma. Master Dasarath plays the young Pappu. Suresh Gopi, who was then six years old, made his acting debut in this film. He appeared as the feudal lord's timid son, who becomes the root cause for Pappu running away from home.

The film was a commercial success and also received critical acclaim for its raw energy and Sathyan's performance in the lead role. It received a certificate of merit at the National Film Awards. It was remade in Tamil as Babu (1971), in Telugu as Marapurani Manishi (1973), and in Hindi as Babu (1985).

== Cast ==
- Sathyan as Pappu
  - Master Dasarath as Young Pappu
- Prem Nazir as Gopinadhan / Gopi
- K. R. Vijaya as Lakshmi
- Kaviyoor Ponnamma as Kalyani, a widow and Lakshmi's Mother
- Adoor Bhasi as palisha vizhungi Velu mothalaly
- Adoor Pankajam as Saramma
- Adoor Bhavani as Pappu's mother
- Manavalan Joseph as Mesthiri
- S. P. Pillai as Thomachan
- Thikkurissy Sukumaran Nair as Chayakadakkaran Kurup
- Master Dasarath as Young Pappu
- Kutty Padmini as Young Lakshmi
- Kottayam Chellappan as Landlord
- Suresh Gopi as Feudal lord's son
- Kalaikkal Kumaran
- Cheriya Udeswaram
- Kumari Vimala
- Muthukulam Raghavan Pilla
- C. O. Anto
- Gopinathan Pilla
- T.T Joseph
- Varghees Thittel
- Shobha

== Soundtrack ==
The music was composed by G. Devarajan with lyrics by Vayalar Ramavarma. There were seven songs by the Vayalar-Devarajan team in the film. Guruvayur Dorai played mridangam in the song "Ambalakkulangare".

No.	Song	Singers	Lyrics	Length (m:ss)
1	"Ambalakkulangare"	P. Leela	Vayalar Ramavarma	
2	"Amme Amme Amme Nammude"	Renuka	Vayalar Ramavarma	
3	"Kaattil Ilam Kaattil"	P. Susheela	Vayalar Ramavarma	
4	"Maanathu Daivamilla"	A. M. Rajah	Vayalar Ramavarma	
5	"Muttathe Mullayil"	S. Janaki	Vayalar Ramavarma	
6	"Muttathe Mullayil" (Pathos)	P. Susheela	Vayalar Ramavarma	
7	"Oh Rikhshaavaala"	Vidyadharan, Mehboob	Vayalar Ramavarma	
8	"Vandikkaara"	K. J. Yesudas	Vayalar Ramavarma	
