= Aadaalla Majaka =

Aadaalla...Majaka!
- Directed by: Muthyala Subbaiah
- Written by: Muthyala Subbaiah
- Produced by: Bezawada Koteswara Rao
- Starring: Vikram; Ooha; Ali; Sudhakar
- Cinematography: K. V. Ramanan
- Edited by: Madhu
- Music by: Raj Bhaskar
- Release date: 1995
- Running time: 136 minutes
- Country: India
- Language: Telugu

Aadaalla...Majaka! is a 1995 Indian Telugu-language romantic film written by and directed by Muthyala Subbaiah. The film stars Vikram, Ooha, and Ali in the leading roles, while Sudhakar plays a supporting role. The film is a remake of the Malayalam film Pidakkozhi Koovunna Noottandu (1994).

== Plot ==
The plot revolves around paying guests staying in a female-only homestay who are self-identified misandrists.

== Cast ==
- Vikram as Vikram
- Ooha as Bhanu Rekha aka Sivaranjini
- Ali as Krishnamurthy "Kittu"
- Kalpana
- Sri Lakshmi
- Sudhakar
- Brahmanandam
- Ajay Rathnam
- Satyanarayana
- AVS as Veeraswamy
- P. Ravishankar
- Narra Venkateswara Rao
- Suthivelu
- P. R. Varalakshmi
- Gayathri
- Ilavarasi
- Srikanya
- Chalapathi Rao

== Soundtrack ==
The soundtrack album was composed by Raj Bhaskar.

== Release ==
The film was later dubbed and released in Tamil under the title Marri by Vijay Sri Film Productions, as a result of Vikram's new found saleability after the release of Sethu (1999). The storyline was heavily edited, with dubbed sequences featuring actresses Ramya Krishnan and Simran added to the film. Following the success of Gemini (2002), the film was dubbed and released again in Tamil as Vahini.

Vikram and Ali later starred together in Ooha.
