= Ironleg Sastri =

Indian comedian of Telugu origin

- గునుపూడి విశ్వనాథ శాస్త్రి
- Born: Gunupudi Viswanatha Sastri; Tadepalligudem, Andhra Pradesh, India
- Died: 19 June 2006
- Occupation: Actor
- Years active: 1982 - 2006

Gunupudi Viswanatha Sastri, better known by his screen name Ironleg Sastri, was an Indian comedian who appeared in over 150 Telugu films. Originally working as a priest for movie inaugural functions, he gained recognition when E. V. V. Satyanarayana cast him as a priest named Ironleg Sastry in Appula Appa Rao (1992). The character's name became widely popular, and Sastri adopted it as his screen name.

== Life ==
Ironleg Sastri was born in a Brahmin family in Tadepalligudem, Andhra Pradesh, India. His birth name was Gunupudi Viswanatha Sastry.

== Filmography ==
1. Little Gang
2. Prema Khaidi (1990)
3. Rowdy Alludu (1991)
4. Appula Appa Rao (1992)
5. Valu Jada Tolu Beltu (1992)
6. Prema Drohi (1992)
7. Jamba Lakidi Pamba (1993)
8. Major Chandrakanth (1993)
9. Evandi Aavida Vachindi (1993)
10. Tholi Muddu (1993)
11. Alibaba Aradajanu Dongalu (1993)
12. Donga Alludu (1993)
13. Allari Priyudu (1993)
14. Abbayigaru (1993)
15. Pekata Papa Rao (1993)
16. Kurradhi Kurradu (1994) as Brahma Lahari
17. Bobbili Simham (1994)
18. Rickshaw Rudraiah (1994)
19. Aame (1994)
20. Kishkindha Kanda (1994)
21. Ooriki Monagadu (1995)
22. Lingababu Love Story (1995)
23. Miss 420 (1995)
24. Aayanaki Iddaru (1995)
25. Pokiri Raja (1995)
26. Leader (1995)
27. Vaddu Bava Thappu (1995)
28. Street Fighter (1995) as Yenugupadam Yeleswara Sastry
29. Ooha (1996)
30. Koothuru (1996)
31. Nalla Pussalu (1996)
32. Akkum Bakkum (1996)
33. Maavichiguru (1996)
34. Circus Sattipandu (1997)
35. Aahwanam (1997)
36. Vammo Vatto O Pellaamo (1997)
37. Chilakkottudu (1997)
38. Veedevadandi Babu (1997)
39. Sreevarante Maavare (1998)
40. Pape Naa Pranam (1998)
41. Aavida Maa Aavide (1998)
42. Thammudu (1999)
43. Swayamvaram (1999)
44. Badri (2000)
45. Sivanna (2000)
46. Daddy (2001)
47. 6 Teens (2001)
48. Raa (2001)
49. Akasa Veedhilo (2001) as himself
50. Premalo Pavani Kalyan (2002)
51. Raghavendra (2003)
52. Toli Choopulone (2003)
53. Chance (2004)
54. Abbai Premalo Paddadu (2004)
55. Yours Abhi (2004)

== Death ==
He suffered with heart problems in 2006. He died on 19 June 2006 at his native place Tadepalligudem. He also suffered with jaundice in the last days of life.
