= Allarodu =

- DVD Cover
- Directed by: K. Ajay Kumar
- Written by: Madhukuri Raja (dialogues)
- Screenplay by: K. Ajay Kumar
- Story by: Ramani
- Produced by: M. A. Gapoor; P. Purshothama Rao; C.Kalyan (Presents)
- Starring: Rajendra Prasad; Surabhi
- Cinematography: Lok Singh
- Edited by: K. Ramesh
- Music by: Vidyasagar
- Production company: Sri Ammulya Art Productions
- Release date: 16 September 1994
- Running time: 133 mins
- Country: India
- Language: Telugu

Allarodu (transl. Naughty Fellow) is a 1994 Telugu-language crime thriller film, produced by M.A.Gapoor, P.Purshothama Rao under the Ammulya Arts banner and directed by K. Ajay Kumar. It stars Rajendra Prasad, Surabhi and music composed by Vidyasagar. The film was recorded as a flop at the box office in India.

== Plot ==
The film begins with Krishna Murthy, a tomcat and womanizer whose wife Satyabhama constantly restrains him. After a few comic scenes, one night, when Bhama is absent, Krishna Murthy finds a pregnant lady, Jayanti, hiding in his car struggling. Upon her request, he shelters her. She delivers a baby boy therein. As a flabbergast, the night he returns from work, Krishna Murthy spots Jayanti murdered when he gets back home. His bestie and Bhama's brother, Inspector Ravi, lands and affirms him guiltless, but claims that he will surely be persecuted if the police find out. As per Ravi's advice, he and Krishna Murthy bury the body in the backyard. Now, Bhama returns when Krishna Murthy forges the baby as his mate's kid who lost his parents. Following this, as a cliffhanger, an unknown man haunts Krishna Murthy about Jayanti. Hence, he notifies Ravi, and they decide to shift the body. When Krishna Murthy is about to do so, the police suddenly round him up and arrest him. In prison, he does not reveal Ravi's involvement to ensure he doesn't lose his job. Bhama also believes there is something wrong and demands an explanation from Krishna Murthy for the murder. Startlingly, Naidu appears in prison, unveiling himself as a CBI officer specially appointed to investigate Jayanti's murder case. Plus, Krishna Murthy is astonished to know Ravi is the man who murdered Jayanti, and that Jayanti is his wife. Ravi plotted to slay her for a second spouse, and while fleeing, she inadvertently climbed into Krishna Murthy's vehicle. Before that, Jayanti drafted a letter to CBI officials for security; thus, Naidu was in charge. Fortuitously, Bhama unearths Ravi & Jayanthi's wedding video cassette. Hereupon, he seeks to kill her, too. At last, Krishna Murthy shields Bhama, and Naidu ceases Ravi. Finally, the movie ends happily with the couple's reunion.

== Cast ==
- Rajendra Prasad as Krishna Murthy
- Surabhi as Satyabhama
- Nagendra Babu as Ravi
- Brahmanandam as Satguru Murthy
- Mallikarjuna Rao as Aakasa Ramaiah
- Tanikella Bharani
- Nizhalgal Ravi as Naidu
- Ananth Babu
- Chidatala Appa Rao
- Silk Smitha as Beauty Queen Sneha
- Latha Sri as Jayanthi
- Radha Prashanthi as Sundari
- Y. Vijaya as Satyabhama's mother

== Soundtrack ==
Allarodu

Film score by Vidyasagar
- Released: 1994
- Genre: Soundtrack
- Length: 20:43
- Label: Supreme Music
- Producer: Vidyasagar

Vidyasagar chronology
Donga Rascal (1994)	Allarodu (1994)	Bangaru Mogudu (1994)

Music composed by Vidyasagar. Lyrics were written by Bhuvana Chandra. Music released on Supreme Music Company.

No.	Title	Singer(s)	Length
1.	"Teacher Teacher"	Mano, Sujatha	4:46
2.	"Sarangaa Srirangaa"	Mano, Sujatha	3:52
3.	"Vakitlo Chali Chali"	Mano, S. P. Sailaja	4:15
4.	"Meeamma Ninnu"	Rajendra Prasad, S. P. Sailaja	3:52
5.	"Agadee Allari Vana"	Mano, Chitra	3:58
Total length:			20:43
