= Babu (1971 film) =

1971 Indian Tamil film

- Poster
- Directed by: A. C. Tirulokchandar
- Screenplay by: A. C. Tirulokchandar
- Based on: Odayil Ninnu by P Kesavadev
- Starring: Sivaji Ganesan; Vijayasri; Sowcar Janaki; Vennira Aadai Nirmala
- Cinematography: M. Viswanatha Rai
- Edited by: R. G. Gopu
- Music by: M. S. Viswanathan
- Production company: Cine Bharath Productions
- Distributed by: AVM Productions
- Release date: 18 October 1971
- Running time: 169 minutes
- Country: India
- Language: Tamil

Babu is a 1971 Indian Tamil-language film directed by A. C. Tirulokchandar. The film stars Sivaji Ganesan, Vijayasri, Sowcar Janaki, and Vennira Aadai Nirmala. It is a remake of the Malayalam film Odayil Ninnu, which itself was based on P. Kesavadev's novel of the same name. Ganesan played a rickshaw puller who adopts his landlord's daughter. The film became a blockbuster at the box office, running for over 100 days in theatres.

== Plot ==
Babu is an orphan and a rickshaw puller. He loses the only person he has ever loved, the lunch girl Kannamma, and gives up on life. One day he meets Sankar, who takes him to his house, gives him new clothes, as he is in an impoverished state and lets his daughter eat with him from the same plate without any regards to his appearance or class. Babu becomes indebted to the family for life. Sankar dies and Babu takes it upon himself to fulfil the dreams of Sankar, making Ammu a graduate.

With the usual troubles of society miscasting the relationship between Parvathi and Babu, things get worse when Ammu falls in love with Prem, affecting her education. She realises the truth soon and starts focusing on her education. Finally, when time comes for marriage between a rich Prem and an educated Ammu, Babu wants to stay away for he does not want the stigma of being brought up by a poor uneducated rickshaw puller associated with her. Ammu, Parvathi, Prem and Vedhachalam, millionaire father of Prem, insist on his presence and with the threat of calling off the marriage, he relents.

== Cast ==
- Sivaji Ganesan as Babu
- Sowcar Janaki as Parvathi
- Balaji as Engineer Sankar
- Sundarrajan as Millinor Vedhachalam
- V. K. Ramasamy as Singaram Pillai
- Nagesh as Thulukanam
- Sivakumar as Prem
- M. R. R. Vasu as Vatti Vadivel
- B. Nirmala as Ammu
- Vijayasri as Kannamma
- Vijayachandrika as Thulukanam's wife
- Roja Ramani as Young Ammu
- Sridevi as Child Ammu
- S. V. Ramadas as Mill Owner
- A. Karunanidhi as Siluvai
- K. M. Nambirajan as Enemy
- Subbiah as Rickshaw puller
- Gemini Balu as Rowdy
- Master Ramu as Child Babu
- Shanmugasundari as Bakkiyam (uncredited)
- Kowsalya Senthamarai as Prem's sister (uncredited)

== Soundtrack ==
The music was composed by M. S. Viswanathan, while the lyrics were written by Vaali. The song "Idho Endhan Deivam" became popular upon release.

Song	Singers
"Varadappa Varadappa"	T. M. Soundararajan (Group Corus)
"Aadhi Mudhale"	T. M. Soundararajan, Sirkazhi Govindarajan, L. R. Eswari, S. C. Krishnan
"Idho Endhan Deivam" 1	T. M. Soundararajan
"Antha Kalathil"	L. R. Eswari
"Enna Solla"	S. P. Balasubrahmanyam, L. R. Eswari
"Idho Endhan Deivam" 2	T. M. Soundararajan, S. Janaki
