= Aayanaki Iddaru =

- DVD cover
- Directed by: E. V. V. Satyanarayana
- Written by: Ankella (dialogues)
- Screenplay by: E. V. V. Satyanarayana
- Story by: Esukapalli Mohan Rao
- Based on: Aaina (1993)
- Produced by: Kantipudi Satyanarayana; Ch. Satyanarayana
- Starring: Jagapati Babu; Ooha; Ramya Krishna
- Cinematography: Adusumelli Vijay Kumar
- Edited by: Kotagiri Venkateswara Rao
- Music by: Koti
- Production company: Sri Tulasi Annapurna Creations
- Release date: 7 July 1995
- Running time: 156 minutes
- Country: India
- Language: Telugu

Aayanaki Iddaru is a 1995 Telugu-language drama film, produced by Kantipudi Satyanarayana and Ch. Satyanarayana under the Sri Tulasi Annapurna Creations banner and directed by E. V. V. Satyanarayana. It stars Jagapati Babu, Ooha, Ramya Krishna and music composed by Koti. The film is a remake of Aaina.

== Plot ==
The film begins with a widower, Krishna Murthy, who performs a second wedding with a benevolent Lakshmi. It taunts his hubristic daughter Ramya by goading outsiders. After a while, Lakshmi gives birth to a baby girl, Ooha, but showers Ramya with love, and she loathes them both. Years roll by, and from childhood, Ramya demands everything that Ooha aspires to. Plus, Lakshmi habituates Ooha to give up because of her prioritization towards Ramya.

Surya, a famous novelist, writes stories for Jabilli magazine, owned by Nageshwara Rao. Ooha admires and silently loves him. She communicates with Surya via letters, and he, too impressed by it, loves her without having ever seen her. Owing to Ooha's friendly bond with her grandpa, she shares everything with him. However, Surya traces her address, where he errors Ramya as Ooha, and she also falls for him. After Surya approaches the elders with the wedding proposal, when Ooha is on cloud nine, imagining herself as a bride, she blacks out and keeps quiet, learning about Surya's intention.

Meanwhile, a sly photographer, Mysore Jackson, snares Ramya and turns her into a cover girl, which Surya reluctantly accepts. On the eve of Surya & Ramya's nuptial, Mysore Jackson dupes Ramya into that she got a jackpot to grow as a famous actress. Therefore, he quits the marital addressing Surya to wait for a few years. To keep up his honor in that predicament, Surya decides to wed Ooha. Though she says no initially, the grandpa coaxes her to go ahead. Soon after the bridal, Ooha professes that he could never win her heart because he belongs to her sister when Surya replies wait and promises not to touch her.

After a while, Ooha spots the framed letter she wrote to Surya and realizes that he only loves herself. On the Verge of Ooha is about expressing the reality that Ramya reenters rebukes and reflects badly on Surya & Ooha when he kicks her out. Moreover, Krishna Mohan ostracizes Ramya, and as a result, she attempts suicide when Surya & Ooha shelter her. Now Ramya tries to create a crack betwixt couple by convergent to Surya, which downcasts Ooha.

During that time, Nageshwara Rao lands at Surya's residence, proclaims that his fans are making a huge fuss, and pleads with him to write a new novel. Then, Surya declares a story, Aayanaki Iddaru, i.e., One person having two wives, which characterizes the daily happening in his house. Being aware of it, Krishna Mohan forcibly takes Ramya. Still, Surya backs her to teach a lesson and make Ooha aggressive—afterward, the two struggle with Surya to pick one of them.

At that point, tense Nageshwara Rao rushes to Surya for the climax when he affirms him to wait a while and moves out with Ramya. He takes her to a suicide spot and mentions that death is the solution to their problem. Thereby, Ramya trembles, saying that she does not love him. Surya heckles, slaps, and points out her mistakes, making Ramya reform. Parallelly, at home, Nageshwara Rao discusses the climax with Ooha, who conveys that the hero should settle with his lover. In contrast, the wife should make a sacrifice by suicide and proceed to his office. Thus, Ooha follows his instructions, consumes poison, and they admit her to the hospital. Being conscious of it, Surya & Ramya reaches the hospital, where Krishna Mohan inculpates Surya for hoodwinking his daughters. In that respect, Surya ripostes says that all these problems are caused by their fostering only. At last, he states the eminence and his love towards Ooha, which snaps back her. Finally, the movie ends happily, with Ramya uniting Surya & Ooha.

== Cast ==
- Jagapathi Babu as Surya
- Ramya Krishna as Ramya (Voice Dubbed by Saritha)
- Ooha as Ooha (Voice Dubbed by Roja Ramani )
- Kota Srinivasa Rao as Mysore Jackson
- Brahmanandam as Nageshwara Rao
- Murali Mohan as Krishna Mohan
- Gummadi as Krishna Mohan's father
- Kavita as Lakshmi
- A.V.S. as Chintapandu Rambabu
- Visweswara Rao as Mysore Jackson's assistant
- Kadambari Kiran
- Ironleg Sastri as Leg Beggar
- Jenny
- Baby Sreshta as young Ramya
- Baby Sunayana as young Ooha

== Soundtrack ==
Aayanaki Iddaru

Film score by Koti
- Released: 1995
- Genre: Soundtrack
- Length: 24:56
- Label: Supreme Music
- Producer: Koti

Koti chronology
Sankalpam (1995)	Aayanaki Iddaru (1995)	Telugu Veera Levara (1995)

Music composed by Koti. Music is released on Supreme Music Company.

No.	Title	Lyrics	Singer(s)	Length
1.	"Arera Kothaga Undiro"	Bhuvanachandra	Mano, Sujatha	5:06
2.	"Madhumasapu Manmadha"	Bhuvanachandra	S. P. Balasubrahmanyam, Chitra	5:09
3.	"O Na Chandramukhi"	Bhuvanachandra	S. P. Balasubrahmanyam, Radhika	4:21
4.	"Andhalammo Andhalu"	Samaveda Shanmuga Sharma	S. P. Balasubrahmanyam, Chitra, M.M.Srilekha	5:13
5.	"O Laila Laila"	Bhuvanachandra	S. P. Balasubrahmanyam, Chitra	5:07
Total length:				24:56
