= Aame =

- DVD Cover
- Directed by: E. V. V. Satyanarayana
- Written by: Mohan Rao Isukapalli (Dialogues)
- Screenplay by: E. V. V. Satyanarayana
- Story by: E. V. V. Satyanarayana
- Produced by: Mullapudi Brahmanandam; P. V. V. S. N. Murthy; G. Nirmala Reddy
- Starring: Srikanth; Ooha; Naresh
- Cinematography: Adusimili Vijaykumar
- Edited by: K. Ravindra Babu
- Music by: Vidyasagar
- Release date: 9 December 1994
- Country: India
- Language: Telugu

Aame (transl. She) is a 1994 Telugu-language drama film by E. V. V. Satyanarayana. The film stars Srikanth, Ooha and Naresh. The film was remade in Kannada as Thaliya Sowbhagya (1995) and in Tamil as Thaali Pudhusu (1997). The film won two Nandi Awards and one Filmfare Award. Aame was the first movie to feature Srikanth and Ooha together.

== Plot ==
Vikram meets Ooha, a young widow living in the household of Srinivasa Rao, and wishes to marry her. Before accepting his proposal, Ooha recounts the events that led to her widowhood.

Srinivasa Rao is a miserly man who wants his son, Anjaneyulu, to make a financially advantageous marriage. Although he considers several prospective brides, Anjaneyulu rejects the matches arranged for him. He falls in love with Ooha, the daughter of Subrahmanyam, a low-paid employee whose family lives in poverty. Subrahmanyam is also burdened by the presence of his unemployed son-in-law, Pattabhi. Srinivasa Rao objects to Anjaneyulu and Ooha's marriage because Ooha's family cannot offer a dowry. Anjaneyulu defies his father and marries Ooha.

On their wedding night, Anjaneyulu dies in an accident, leaving Ooha widowed shortly after her marriage. Following his death, the men around her attempt to exploit her vulnerability and her income. Ooha is passed between her parental home and her in-laws' house, where she faces continued pressure and mistreatment. Pattabhi, her brother-in-law, takes advantage of her circumstances, while Srinivasa Rao is primarily concerned with the financial benefit he can obtain from her.

After learning of Ooha's past, Vikram remains willing to marry her. Srinivasa Rao and Pattabhi oppose the proposed marriage and attempt to prevent it by claiming that Ooha is already married. Srinivasa Rao later attempts to molest Ooha in order to stop the marriage. His wife intervenes and kills him in anger. Following these events, Ooha marries Vikram.

== Cast ==
- Srikanth as Anjaneyulu
- Ooha as Ooha
- Naresh as Vikram
- Chandra Mohan as Subrahmanyam
- Tanikella Bharani as Pattabhi
- Kota Srinivasa Rao as Srinivasa Rao
- Brahmanandam as Priest
- Chalapathi Rao
- AVS
- Sangeeta as Ooha's mother
- Sudha as Anjaneyulu's mother
- Ironleg Sastri
- Tirupathi Prakash

== Soundtrack ==
Aame

Soundtrack album by Vidyasagar
- Released: 1994
- Recorded: 1994
- Genre: Soundtrack
- Length: 21:28
- Label: Aditya Music
- Producer: Vidyasagar

The film's music was composed by Vidyasagar. Music released on Aditya Music Company.

Track List
No.	Title	Singer(s)	Length
1.	"O Challagali"	Girisam, Radhika	3:09
2.	"Uhala Pallaki"	S. P. Balasubrahmanyam, K. S. Chithra	4:58
3.	"Ammammammamma"	S. P. Balasubrahmanyam	4:33
4.	"Challagaliki"	S. P. Balasubrahmanyam, K. S. Chithra	4:31
5.	"Nagamani Nagamani"	S. P. Balasubrahmanyam, K. S. Chithra	4:17
Total length:			21:28

== Awards ==
Nandi Awards - 1994

- Best Actress - Ooha
- Special Jury Award - I. Mohan Rao ( Writing )

Filmfare Awards South

- Filmfare Award for Best Film - Telugu - Mullapudi Brahmanandam (Film Producer)
