= Aranmanai Kaavalan =

- Theatrical release poster
- Directed by: Selva Vinayagam
- Screenplay by: Selva Vinayagam
- Story by: Arul
- Produced by: K. Muralidharan; V. Swaminathan; G. Venugopal
- Starring: R. Sarathkumar; Sivaranjani
- Cinematography: B. Balamurugan
- Edited by: P. Venkateswara Rao
- Music by: Deva
- Production company: Lakshmi Movie Makers
- Release date: 25 February 1994
- Running time: 145 minutes
- Country: India
- Language: Tamil

Aranmanai Kaavalan (transl. Protector of the Palace) is a 1994 Indian Tamil-language action drama film directed by Selva Vinayagam and produced by Lakshmi Movie Makers. It is the first film produced by the studio. The film stars R. Sarathkumar and Sivaranjani. It was released on 25 February 1994.

== Plot ==
Sakthi and his best-friend Thangamani are taxi-drivers in Mumbai. Sakthi fights for the Tamil community against the local rowdies who want to expel them from their area. The Tamil Association of Mumbai prepares the 25th-anniversary function, so the association's presidents invite the pillars of the association. Still, only one person does not respond for the invitation: Karpagavalli, the wife of the late founder Sandanapandian. The presidents go to Karpagavalli's village Pasumpon to invite her, but they are driven out from the village. In fact, Karpagavalli and her three relatives, one of who is Uma, are held prisoners by the heartless Duraipandi in his palace. Under pressure, Duraipandi finally lets Karpagavalli go to the function in Mumbai.

Meanwhile, the police officers force the Tamil community to leave their place, but they refuse, so the police officers kidnap and rape the young girls under the influence of the ruthless Amara Settu. Sakthi turns berserk, and he kills all the police officers and Amara Settu who created conflicts between the Tamil people and Hindi people. Therefore, Sakthi becomes a hero for the community, and they ask him to flee instead of surrendering. By chance, Sakthi and Thangamani take the same train as Karpagavalli. Karpagavalli asks them to come to her village, and she compels Sakthi to become the palace's protector. Later, Sakthi and Thangamani try to leave the village, but Karpagavalli stops them. In the process, Karpagavalli was heavily wounded by Duraipandi's henchmen.

In the past, Sandanapandian was the village chief and was a respected man. While his uncle, Duraipandi's father, was a womaniser and was hated by the villagers, his uncle was jealous of Sandanapandian. One day, he behaved badly with schoolgirls, so Sandanapandian forced him to beg forgiveness from the girl at the village court. After this humiliation, Duraipandi's father committed suicide. Duraipandi killed all the men of Sandanapandian's family, including Sandanapandian. Later, Duraipandi's mother self-immolated. Since that day, Duraipandi sequesters Karpagavalli, Uma and her family.

After telling her poignant past, Karpagavalli dies on Sakthi's knees. So Sakthi challenges the villain Duraipandi to prepare Uma's wedding. Meanwhile, Uma falls in love with Sakthi. What transpires subsequent forms the rest of the story.

== Cast ==
- R. Sarathkumar as Sakthi
- Sivaranjani as Uma
- Goundamani as Thangamani
- Vijayakumar as Sandanapandian
- Raghuvaran as Duraipandi
- Mohan Natarajan as Sandanapandian's uncle
- Srividya as Karpagavalli
- Kavitha
- Sathyapriya
- Pandu
- K. Rajpreeth as Amara Settu
- Veera Pandiyan as Duraipandi's son
- Visu as Santhanam
- Delhi Ganesh as Police inspector
- Khushbu in a cameo appearance
- Citizen Mani in an uncredited role

== Soundtrack ==
The music was composed by Deva, with lyrics written by Vairamuthu.

Track listing
No.	Title	Singer(s)	Length
1.	"Aranmanai Deepam"	Sangeetha Sajith	1:31
2.	"Ketti Melam"	S. P. Balasubrahmanyam	4:22
3.	"Manushangala"	Deva, R. Sarathkumar	4:53
4.	"Oorukkule Nallavan"	S. P. Balasubrahmanyam, K. S. Chithra	4:37
5.	"Rajakumaran"	S. P. Balasubrahmanyam, K. S. Chithra	4:51
6.	"Santhanapandi"		1:04
Total length:			21:18

== Release and reception ==
Aranmanai Kaavalan was released on 25 February 1994, alongside another Sarathkumar starrer Captain. Although Sarathkumar wanted either film to be postponed, the producers remained adamant. Malini Mannath of The Indian Express gave the film a positive review and said "a fairly engrossing entertainer, despite flaws, Aranmanai Kaavalan has an engaging screenplay, neat treatment and suspense that keeps the viewers on tenterhooks". K. N. Vijiyan of New Straits Times called the film "slightly better than other average Sarath movies". Thulasi of Kalki panned the story as predictable, humour being unfunny and dismissed Deva's music as repetitive and concluded the review saying Sarathkumar seemed to be working by calculating one film a month; it was fine if it did not go wrong and make producers run away.
