= Surbhi Javeri Vyas =

Indian actress and model

- Education: Mithibai College, Mumbai
- Occupations: Model, actress, artist
- Spouse: Dharmesh Vyas

Surbhi Javeri Vyas, known mononymously as Surabhi, is an Indian actress and model primarily known for her work in Telugu cinema and Hindi television.

She started her career in 1993 with Malayalam film Chenkol and then mainly worked in Telugu films. Some of her better known works include Chenkol, Money Money (1994), Palnati Pourusham (1994). She is currently working as a Gujarati theatre artist and as a television actress in Hindi serials.

== Personal life ==
Surbhi Javeri is married to Dharmesh Vyas, a Gujarati actor and an assistant director with whom she shared the stage in a number of Gujarati plays like Aaradhna, Rupiyo Nach Nachave, Tamara Bhai Fulltoo Fatak, Bhale Padharya and Pachi Kaheta Nahi Ke Kahyu Nahotu.

A Gujarati television reality show called Premno Prime Time produced by film actor and producer Kamlesh Oza was nearly based on their real life journey.

== Filmography ==
Year	Film	Role	Language	Notes
1988	Zakhmi Aurat	Neelu	Hindi	Special appearance
1993	Chenkol	Indu	Malayalam	
1994	Money Money	Sudha	Telugu	
1994	Allarodu	Satya Bhama	Telugu	
1994	Bangaru Mogudu	Saranya	Telugu	
1994	M. Dharmaraju M.A.	Thulasi	Telugu	
1994	Nyaya Rakshana		Telugu	
1994	Palnati Pourusham	Lakshmi	Telugu	
1995	Kondapalli Rattayya	Seeta	Telugu	
1995	Simha Garjana		Telugu	
1995	Ketu Duplicatu	Usha	Telugu	
1995	Bharatha Simham		Telugu	Guest Appearance
1995	Dear Brother		Telugu	Guest Appearance in the song "Gahadunnadhi Bossu"
1996	Srimathi Kalyana	Geetha	Kannada	
1996	Hello Daddy	Surabhi	Kannada	

== Dubbing roles ==
=== Animated series ===
Program title	Original Voice(s)	Character	Dub language	Original language	Number of episodes	Original airdate	Dubbed airdate	Notes
Batman: The Animated Series	Diane Pershing and Various Voices	Dr. Pamela Isley / Poison Ivy and Various Characters	Hindi	English	95	9/5/1992- 9/15/1995	9/9/2000- 7/8/2005	Aired on Cartoon Network India much later after the original airing. Season 1(65 episodes) is streaming on Netflix India.
The Powerpuff Girls	Jennifer Martin	Ms. Sara Bellum	Hindi	English	78	11/18/1998- 3/25/2005	1999-2005	Aired on Zee TV and Cartoon Network.

=== Live action films ===
Film Title	Actress	Character	Dub Language	Original Language	Original Year Release	Dub Year Release	Notes
101 Dalmatians	Joely Richardson	Anita Campbell-Green-Dearly	Hindi	English	1996	Unknown	
Ghost Rider	Eva Mendes	Roxanne Simpson	Hindi	English	2007	2007	
Fantastic Four: Rise of the Silver Surfer	Jessica Alba	Susan Storm	Hindi	English	2007	2007	
Race to Witch Mountain	Carla Gugino	Dr. Alex Friedman	Hindi	English	2009	2009	
Ala Vaikunthapurramuloo	Tabu	Yasoda (Yasu) (Nisha in Hindi version)	Hindi	Telugu	2020	2022	
A Aa	Nadhiya	Mahalakshmi	Hindi	Telugu	2016	2018	
Black Panther: Wakanda Forever	Julia Louis-Dreyfus	Valentina Allegra de Fontaine	Hindi	English	2022	2022	
Avatar: The Way of Water	Edie Falco	General Frances Ardmore	Hindi	English	2022	2022	
Thunderbolts*	Julia Louis-Dreyfus	Valentina Allegra de Fontaine	Hindi	English	2025	2025	
Heads of State	Carla Gugino	Elizabeth Kirk	Hindi	English	2025	2025	
Avatar: Fire and Ash	Edie Falco	General Frances Ardmore	Hindi	English	2025	2025	

=== Live action series ===
Program title	Actress	Character	Dub Language	Original Language	Number of Episodes	Original airdate	Dubbed airdate	Notes
Money Heist	Najwa Nimri	Alicia Sierra	Hindi	Spanish	41	2 May 2017 – 3 December 2021		
The Falcon and the Winter Soldier	Julia Louis-Dreyfus	Valentina Allegra de Fontaine	Hindi	English	2	2021	2021	

=== Animated films ===
Program title	Actress	Character	Dub Language	Original Language	Original Year Release	Dub Year Release	Notes
Batman: Mask of the Phantasm	Dana Delany	Andrea "Andi" Beaumont	Hindi	English	1993	2000	Aired by Cartoon Network on 25 November 2000.
Madagascar	Jada Pinkett Smith	Gloria	Hindi	English	2005	2005	
Madagascar: Escape 2 Africa	Jada Pinkett Smith	Gloria	Hindi	English	2008	2008	

== See also ==
- List of Indian dubbing artists

== Television ==
Year	Serial	Role	Language	Channel Network
2011	Mukti Bandhan	Charulata Virani	Hindi	Colors TV
2013	Punar Vivah - Ek Nayi Umeed	Vandana Dubey	Hindi	Zee TV
2013	Saath Nibhaana Saathiya	Nikki	Hindi	Star Plus
2014	Piya Basanti Re	Neeta Mahesh Shah	Hindi	Sony Pal
2014	Mere Rang Mein Rangne Waali	Suhasini Pathak	Hindi	Life OK
2021	Ishq Mein Marjawan 2	Uma Raisinghania	Hindi	Colors TV
