= Oruvan (1999 film) =

- Poster
- Directed by: Suresh Krissna
- Written by: Gopu Babu (dialogues)
- Story by: Suresh Krissna
- Produced by: V. Swaminathan; G. Venugopal; K. Muralidharan
- Starring: Sarathkumar; Pooja Batra; Devayani
- Cinematography: S. Saravanan
- Edited by: Suresh Urs
- Music by: Deva
- Production company: Lakshmi Movie Makers
- Release date: 25 June 1999
- Running time: 153 minutes
- Country: India
- Language: Tamil

Oruvan (transl. One Man) is a 1999 Indian Tamil-language action drama film directed by Suresh Krissna. The film stars Sarathkumar, Pooja Batra and Devayani, while Raghuvaran and Anandaraj play supporting roles. Produced by Lakshmi Movie Makers, the film had cinematography handled by S. Saravanan and music composed by Deva. It was released on 25 June 1999.

== Cast ==
- Sarathkumar as Surya
- Pooja Batra as Kalpana
- Devayani as Nandini
- Raghuvaran as Krishna Prasad IPS
- Anandaraj as Peter Fernandes
- Manivannan
- Delhi Ganesh
- Vadivelu
- Vivek
- K. S. Jayalakshmi
- Master Vicky

== Production ==
Hindi film actress Pooja Batra played her first lead role in Tamil cinema through the project. While the film was in the post-production stage, Suresh Krissna moved on to begin work on two other projects starring Karthik and Vijay. Neither film later materialised.

== Soundtrack ==
The music was composed by Deva. The song “Chinna Roja” was adapted from Deva's own composition “Chandamama” from the Telugu film Auto Driver. The song received particular praise for its composition, while the other songs from the film were generally well received.

Song	Singers	Lyrics
"Chinna Roja"	Hariharan	Palani Bharathi
"Gopala Gopala"	Deva, S. P. Balasubrahmanyam, Sujatha	Kalaikumar
"O Nandini"	S. P. Balasubrahmanyam, Sujatha	Ra. Ravishankar
"Vaarevaa"	Vandemataram Srinivas	Palani Bharathi
"Vandhachu Vandhachu"	Mano, Sujatha	Kalaikumar

== Release and reception ==
Oruvan was released on 25 June 1999. Kala Krishnan Ramesh of Deccan Herald wrote, "The story, screenplay and direction by Suresh Krishna whose, earlier [Sangamam] or [Aha], was not as good. But Oruvan still has something to offer". They felt that Devayani was underutilised and Batra looks "gawky", while Sarathkumar was "good and pleasant to watch". Thamarai Manalan of Dinakaran gave the film a positive review, noting Suresh Krishna "has extracted hard and good work from the artists. The way in which he has conceived as well as picturized the passionate and emotive scenes connected with the small boy Vikky has earned the former our great appreciation." K. P. S. of Kalki praised the performances of Sarathkumar and Anandraj, Deva's music and Saravanan's cinematography. D. S. Ramanujam of The Hindu wrote, "Sarat Kumar gives a temporary respite to his firebrand roles and plays a character filled with tender emotions and sentiments in Lakshmi Movie Makers', Oruvan. Experienced director Suresh Krishna works up adequate situations, based on his story and screenplay". Vicky won the Tamil Nadu State Film Award for Best Child Artist.
