= P. Kesavadev =

Indian novelist and reformer (1904–1983)

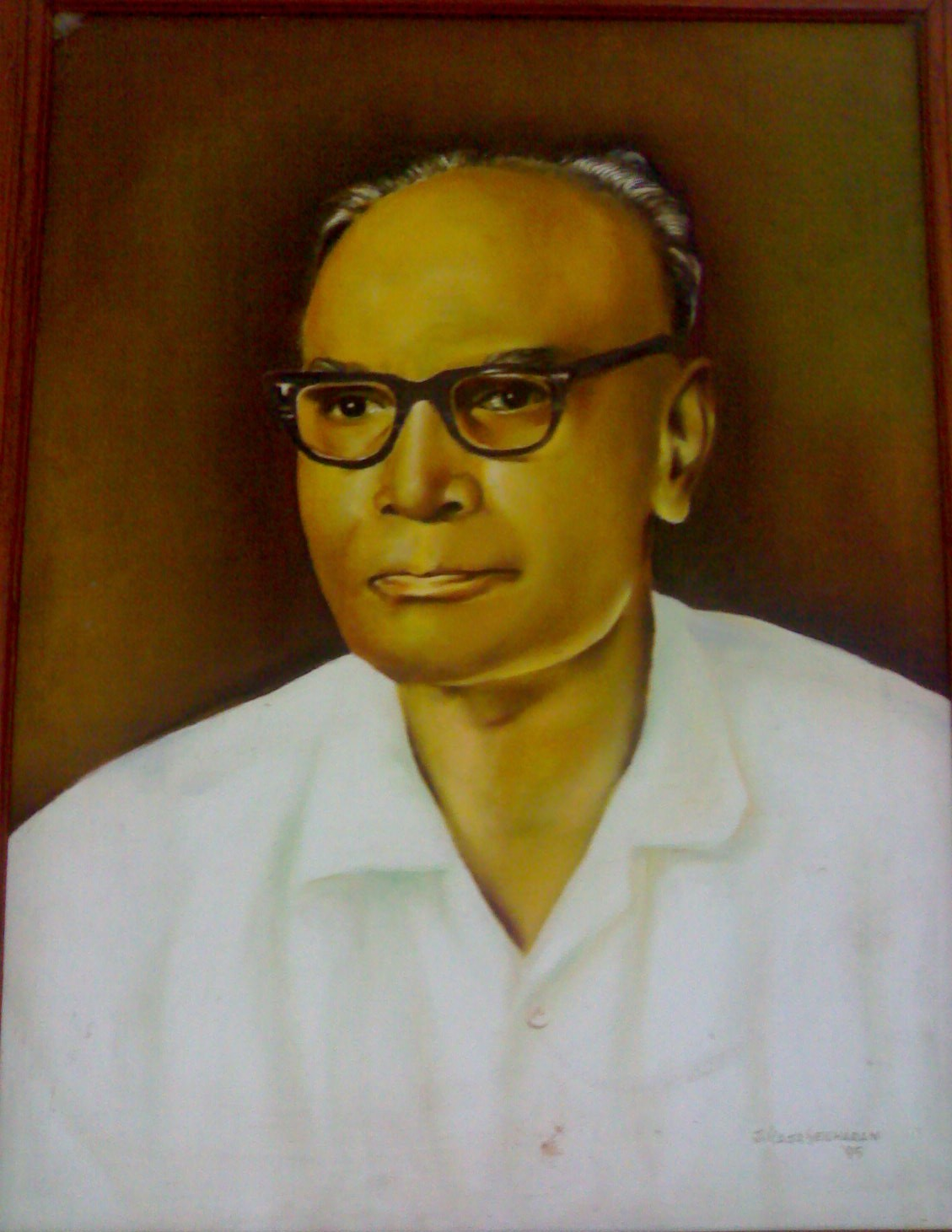
- Born: 20 July 1904; Kedamangalam, North Paravur, Ernakulam, British Raj
- Died: 1 July 1983 (aged 78); Trivandrum, Kerala, India
- Spouse: Seethalekshmi Dev
- Children: 1
- Relatives: Appu Pillai (father); Karthiyayani Amma (mother)
- Writing career
- Notable awards: Sahitya Akademi Award; Soviet Land Nehru Award; Kerala Sahitya Akademi Fellowship
- Website: kesavadev.net

P. Kesava Pillai (20 July 1904 – 1 July 1983), better known by his pen-name P. Kesavadev, was a novelist and social reformer of Kerala, India. He is remembered for his speeches, autobiographies, novels, dramas, short stories, and films. Odayil Ninnu, Nadhi, Bhrandalayam, Ayalkar (Central Academi Award-winning novel), Ethirppu (autobiography) and Oru Sundariyude Athmakadha are some among his 128 literary works. Kesavadev, Thakazhi Sivasankara Pillai and Vaikom Muhammad Basheer are considered the exponents of progressive Malayalam literature.

== Life and career ==
Keshavadev, born Keshava Pillai, on July 21, 1904, at Kedamangalam, a small hamlet near North Paravur, then British Raj, to Appu Pillai-Karthyayani Amma couple. He had formal education only up to High School levels when he had to abandon it due to financial constraints and take up part-time jobs such as a collection agent, tuition teacher and cloth merchant. It was during this time, he was influenced by the thoughts of Sahodaran Ayyappan and participated in the Mishra Bhojanam, a grand feast organized by Ayyappan where around 200 people including people of the lower castes sat together to eat. Subsequently, he joined Arya Samaj and adopted the name Kesavadev to get rid of his last name "Pillai" which denoted his caste. He later aligned himself with the Indian National Congress and with the Communist Party of India. He was involved with several publications, starting with Swadeshabhimani as an interim editor when A. K. Pillai, the then editor traveled to the UK. Malayala Rajyam, Bhaje Bharatham, Prathidinam and Thozhilali were some of the other publications he was involved with; the last one when he was an active communist. He also wrote propaganda literature for the communist movement and served as the president of the Sahitya Pravarthaka Sahakarana Sangham (Sahitya Pravarthaka Cooperative Society) and Kerala Sahitya Akademi.

Kesavadev published his autobiography, Ethirppu, in 1959, which reflected his communist ideals. He was a recipient of Kerala Sahitya Akademi Fellowship. In 1964, Sahitya Akademi selected his work, Ayalkkar for their annual award for Novel. He was also a recipient of the Soviet Land Nehru Award.

Kesavadev's first marriage was to Gomathy Amma but the marriage did not last long. His married again in 1957 when he was in the sixties and working at the All India Radio; Seethalekshmi Dev, his second wife was a novelist and was much younger to him in her thirties. They had a son.

Kesavadev died on July 1, 1983, at the age of 78.

== Novels ==
Kesavadev emerged as one of the makers of 'modern Malayalam fiction'. He can be referred to as the first writer to usher in the Renaissance in Malayalam literature, by writing the novel Odayil Ninnu (From the Gutter; 1942) with a rickshaw puller as its hero. Dev was in the forefront among the writers who employed new norms in the content and characterisation in Malayalam fiction. Odayil Ninnu came as a shocking revelation that a finest piece of literature can be produced with commonplace themes and unconventional style of prose with ordinary mortals as heroes and heroines. Apart from the fact that the appearance of rickshaw puller was a thrilling experience at that time, he was known to have started a new trait in Malayalam literature and many writers followed suit. The novel was made into a movie with the name unchanged, by K. S. Sethumadhavan in 1965.

His second novel, Bhranthalayam (The Mad House; 1949), was novel based on the tragedy of partition of the nation and showed Kesavadev as a humanist. Rowdy, his next novel, was published in 1958, which was based on the story of an abused orphan, taking to arms in defense against the community, narrated in a sarcastic style. K. S. Sethumadhavan's 1966 film, Rowdy was based on this novel. Ayalkar (The Neighbours), published in 1963, is considered by many as his masterpiece. This novel is acclaimed as the chronicle of the evolution of the three leading communities of the State of Kerala, the Nairs, Christians and Ezhavas from the days of feudalism to the post independent era. Writing about the tragedy of the disintegration of the two major tharavads – Mangalassery and Pachazhi, Kesavadev recreates their past and also narrates the trials and tribulations paving the way for their total destruction as well as the history of the state for a period of about fifty years from the times of feudalism to the rise of the new era. The novel won the Sahitya Akademi Award.

The other works of Dev adapted as movies are Aadhyathe Katha (1972) directed by K. S. Sethumadhavan, Oru Sundariyude Athmakatha, renamed as Oru Sundariyude Katha and directed Thoppil Bhasi (1972) and Swapnam (1973), the directorial debut of Babu Nanthankode. His unfinished novel Padicha Kallanmar was later rewritten and published by his wife Seethalekshmi Dev.

== Short stories ==
Kesavadev was a prolific writer. He has written about 300 short stories. His stories offer a very wide range and variety in theme and technique and deal with the trivialities of the ordinary people as their themes.

== Plays ==
Though Kesavadev is primarily known for his contributions as a Novelist and Short Story writer, the full-length plays and one act plays he has written were very popular in those days and attracted huge audience when enacted on stages. His plays reflect his social criticism. Plays like Pradhanamanthri (Prime Minister) have political undertones and were popular.

== Kesavadev Awards ==
P. Kesavadev Trust has instituted P. Kesavadev Awards to be presented yearly to two dignified personalities. One award goes to literature (poetry, novel, and essays). Diabscreen Kerala- Kesavadev Trust Award is presented to best health related article/report alternatively to visual and print media. Sugathakumari, Gopinath Muthukad, G.N. Panicker and Mohanlal are among the recipients of the award.

== Bibliography ==
=== Novels ===
- P. Kesavadev (1942). Odayil Ninnu. Poorna Publications. ISBN 978-8171801343.
- P. Kesavadev (1949). Bhranthalayam. Sahitya Pravarthaka Co-operative Society Ltd. ISBN 9780000103727.
- P. Kesavadev (1958). Roudy. Poorna Publications. ISBN 978-8171803842.
- P. Kesavadev (1951). Nadi. National Book Stall.
- P. Kesavadev (1951). Ulakka. S.P.C.S.
- P. Kesavadev (1961). Kannadi. DC Books. ISBN 9788126407415.
- P. Kesavadev (1961). Sakhavu Karottu Karanavar. DC Books. Archived from the original on 1 November 2018.
- P. Kesavadev (1963). Pankalaaksheede Diary. ISBN 9788126409990.
- P. Kesavadev (1963). Prema Viddi. Archived from the original on 3 October 2018.
- P. Kesavadev (1967). Swapnam. Current Books.
- P. Kesavadev (1967). Sughikkan Vendi. Poorna Publishers. ISBN 978-8130013251.
- P. Kesavadev (1968). Adhyathe Kadha. National book stall.
- P. Kesavadev (1968). Adhikaram. National Book Stall.
- P. Kesavadev (1970). Oru Sundariyude Atmakatha. Poorna Publications. ISBN 978-8171808427.
- P. Kesavadev (1974). Velicham Kerunnu. DC Books. ISBN 8126411228.
- Kesavadev, P. (1974). "Njondiyude Kadha". find.uoc.ac.in (in Malayalam).
- Kesavadev, P. (1975). "Randammayum Oru Makanum". find.uoc.ac.in (in Malayalam).
- Kesavadev, P. (1986). "Nahna Thettukaran". find.uoc.ac.in (in Malayalam).
- P. Kesavadev (1995). Ayalkkar. Kōṭṭayaṃ: DC Books. ISBN 8171304532. OCLC 35169081.
- P. Kesavadev. Enikkum Jeevikkanam. H & C. p. 112. ISBN 978-9382776369.
- P. Kesavadev. Oru Lakshavum Carum. Poorna Publications. ISBN 978-8130008561.

=== Short stories ===
- P, Kesavadev (1969). "Therenjedutha Kadhakal". find.uoc.ac.in (in Malayalam). Archived from the original on 26 January 2019.
- Kesavadev, P. (1969). "Theranjedutha Kathakal, Part II". find.uoc.ac.in (in Malayalam).
- P. Kesavadev (2012). Sarvarajya Kozhikale Sangadikkuvin. DC Books. ISBN 978-8126439201.
- P. Kesavadev (2007). Prathijnayum Mattu Pradhana Kathakalum. DC Books. ISBN 9788126405619.
- P. Kesavadev (2011). Kesavadevinte Kathakal. DC Books. ISBN 9788126431670.
- P. Kesavadev (2010). Kesavadeinte Samboornakathakal. Poorna Publications. ISBN 978-8130010793.
- Kesavadev, P. (1965). "Swargathil Oru Cheguthan". find.uoc.ac.in (in Malayalam).

=== Plays ===
- Pradhanamanthri (1940)
- Munnottu (1947)
- Manthriyaakkalle (1949)
- Njanippokamunistaavum(1953)
- Thondukari (1954)
- Mazhayangum Kudayingum (1956)
- Orumuri thenga (1959)

=== Memoirs ===
- P. Kesavadev. Ethirppu. DC Books. ISBN 978-8126453108.

=== Other books ===
- Kesavadev.P (1946). "Samarakavi". find.uoc.ac.in (in Malayalam).
- Kesavadev, P. (1954). "Russiayude Kamukan". find.uoc.ac.in (in Malayalam).
- Kesavadev, P. (1992). "Novel Ente Kazhchappadil". find.uoc.ac.in (in Malayalam).

== Film adaptations ==
- Odayil Ninnu (1965)
- Rowdy (1966)
- Babu (1971)
- Aadhyathe Katha (1972)
- Oru Sundariyude Katha (1972)
- Swapnam (1973)
