= Ooha =

Indian actress

- Born: Uma Maheswari
- Occupation: Actress
- Years active: 1990–1997
- Notable work: Aame (1994)

Uma Maheswari, known by her stage names Sivaranjani (in Tamil and Malayalam film industries) and Ooha (in Telugu film industry), is a former Indian actress. She worked primarily in Tamil and Telugu films, in addition to Malayalam films in the 1990s. She received Nandi Award for Best Actress for Aame (1994).

== Personal life ==
Siva Ranjani real name Umamaheswari also known as Ooha in Telugu films was born in a Kerala Malayali Brahmin family (Born in 1970). She married actor Srikanth in 1997 and the couple has three children Roshan Meka, Medha and Rohan. She is a peculiar beauty and her light eyes are her high lights. She got introduced in Nila Penne, which stars Divya Bharti as heroine in her 1st film.

== Filmography ==
| Year | Film | Role | Language | Notes |
|---|---|---|---|---|
| 1990 | Nila Pennae | Girl in the intro scene on hills | Tamil | Uncredited role |
| 1990 | Mr. Karthik | | Tamil | |
| 1991 | Manasara Vazhthungalen | | Tamil | |
| 1992 | Thalaivasal | Shobana | Tamil | |
| 1992 | Thanga Manasukkaran | Chellakili | Tamil | |
| 1992 | Pandu Pandoru Rajakumari | Alice | Malayalam | |
| 1992 | Maarathon (Aayaraam Gayaaraam) | Vimala | Malayalam | |
| 1992 | David Uncle | Selvi / Mary | Tamil | |
| 1992 | Thiruthalvaadi | Indu | Malayalam | |
| 1993 | Chinna Mapillai | Mythili | Tamil | |
| 1993 | Pon Vilangu | Mallika | Tamil | |
| 1993 | Kalaignan | Sandhya | Tamil | |
| 1993 | Thaalattu | Valli | Tamil | |
| 1993 | Rajadurai | Suriya | Tamil | |
| 1993 | Pass Mark | Special Appearance | Tamil | |
| 1993 | Pudhiya Thendral | Priya | Tamil | |
| 1993 | Kathirukka Neramillai | Radhika | Tamil | |
| 1994 | Puthran | | Malayalam | |
| 1994 | Aranmanai Kaavalan | Uma | Tamil | |
| 1994 | Rasa Magan | Selvi | Tamil | |
| 1994 | Vandicholai Chinraasu | Kalyani | Tamil | |
| 1994 | Senthamizh Selvan | Meenakshi | Tamil | |
| 1994 | Aame | Ooha | Telugu | Nandi Award for Best Actress; Nominated—Filmfare Award for Best Actress – Telugu |
| 1994 | Patabasti | Shanthi | Telugu | |
| 1995 | Sandhaikku Vantha Kili | | Tamil | |
| 1995 | Alluda Mazaaka...! | Malleeswari | Telugu | |
| 1995 | Adalla Majaka | Bhanu Rekha | Telugu | |
| 1995 | Aayanaki Iddaru | Ooha | Telugu | |
| 1995 | Manikya Chempazhukka | Rajavalli /Anupama | Malayalam | |
| 1996 | Avathara Purushan | Vaishali | Tamil | |
| 1996 | Sahanam | | Telugu | |
| 1996 | Family | Kavita | Telugu | |
| 1996 | Amma Nanna Kaavaali | Sita | Telugu | |
| 1996 | Ooha | Ooha | Telugu | |
| 1996 | Ammaleni Puttinellu | | Telugu | |
| 1996 | Kooturu | Mounica | Telugu | |
| 1997 | Aayanagaru | | Telugu | |
| 1997 | Durgai Amman | Gauri | Tamil | |
| 1997 | Nayanamma | | Telugu | |

== Television ==
- En Iniya Iyanthira, Sibi fiction series
