= List of Malayalam films of 1990 =

The following is a list of Malayalam films released in the year 1990.

Opening		Film	Cast	Director	Music director	Notes
J A N	12	Avasanathe Rathri	Vincent, Bablu, Bhima Raghu, Uma Maheshwari	K. S. Gopalakrishnan	Kannur Rajan	
J A N	12	Varthamana Kalam	Urvashi, Suresh Gopi, Balachandramenon, Jayaram	I. V. Sasi	Johnson	
J A N	19	Enquiry	Innocent, Ashokan	U. V. Ravindranath	Rajamani	
J A N	25	Aye Auto	Mohanlal, Rekha	Venu Nagavally	Raveendran	
J A N	26	Crime Branch	Captain Raju, Rohini, Venu Nagavally	K. S. Gopalakrishnan	M. G. Radhakrishnan	
J A N	26	Orukkam	Suresh Gopi, Ranjini, Sithara	K. Madhu	Johnson	
J A N	28	Purappadu	Mammootty, Parvathy Jayaram, Sumalatha	Jeassy	Ouseppachan	
F E B	1	Chuvanna Kannukal	Sugandhi, Shyamala	Sasi Mohan	Jerry Amaldev	
F E B	2	Sunday 7 PM	Nimmi Daniels, Sai Kumar, Silk Smitha	Shaji Kailas	Johnson	
F E B	2	Malootty	Jayaram, Urvashi, Baby Shamili	Bharathan	Johnson	
F E B	2	Akkare Akkare Akkare	Mohanlal, Sreenivasan, Parvathy Jayaram	Priyadarshan	Ouseppachan	
F E B	16	No.20 Madras Mail	Mohanlal, Mammootty, Jagadish, Maniyanpilla Raju, Suchitra	Joshiy	Ouseppachan	
F E B	16	Maanmizhiyaal	Ashokan, Sithara, Shari	Krishnaswamy	Murali Sithara	
F E B	16	Sasneham	Balachandra Menon, Shobhana, Innocent	Sathyan Anthikkad	Johnson	
F E B	23	Naale Ennundengil	Sukumaran, Silk Smitha, Captain Raju	Sajan	Shyam	
M A R	2	Urvashi	P.Sukumar, Abhilasha	P. Chandrakumar		
M A R	9	Nidrayil Oru Raathri	Kapil Dev, Siddique	Asha Khan		
M A R	15	Kottayam Kunjachan	Mammootty, Ranjini, Sukumaran	T. S. Suresh Babu	Shyam	
M A R	16	Niyamam Enthucheyyum	Shankar, Ratheesh, Nalini	Arun	Johnson	
M A R	16	Commander	Captain Raju, Kuthiravattom Pappu	Cross Belt Mani		
M A R	16	Vachanam	Jayaram, Suresh Gopi, Sithara	Lenin Rajendran	Mohan Sithara	
M A R	23	Mridula	Captain Raju, Master Raghu, Mrudula	Antony Eastman		
M A R	23	Anantha Vruthantham	Sai Kumar, Ranjini	P. Anil		
M A R	23	Shesham Screenil	Devan, Silk Smitha, Prameela	P. Venu		
M A R	31	His Highness Abdullah	Mohanlal, Gautami, Sreenivasan, Nedumudi Venu	Sibi Malayil	Raveendran	
A P L	5	Mouna Daaham	Harish Kumar	K. Radhakrishnan		
A P L	12	Midhya	Mammooty, Suresh Gopi, Rupini	I. V. Sasi	Shyam	
A P L	13	Mukham	Mohanlal, Ranjini, Nassar	Mohan	Johnson	
A P L	14	Kadathanadan Ambadi	Mohanlal, Prem Nazir, Radhu, Swapna	Priyadarsan	K. Raghavan	
A P L	20	Rajavazhcha	Suresh Gopi, Ranjini, Sai Kumar	Sasi Kumar	Johnson	
A P L	26	Brahma Rakshass	Devan, Renuka	Vijayan Karote		
A P L	27	Aaram Vardil Aabhyanthara Kalaham	Vineeth, Priya, Thilakan	Murali	A. T. Ummer	
M A Y	4	Innale	Jayaram, Shobhana, Suresh Gopi	P. Padmarajan	Perumbavoor G. Raveendranath	
M A Y	4	Pavam Pavam Rajakumaran	Sreenivasan, Rekha, Jagadish, Jayaram	Kamal	Johnson	
M A Y	4	Dr. Pasupathy	Innocent, Mamukkoya, Parvathy Jayaram	Shaji Kailas	Johnson	
M A Y	18	Thoovalsparsham	Jayaram, Mukesh, Sai Kumar, Urvashi	Kamal	Ouseppachan	
M A Y	18	Mathilukal	Mammootty, Murali, Thilakan	Adoor Gopalakrishnan	Vijay Bhaskar	
M A Y	18	Chuvappu Naada	Abhilasha	K. S. Gopalakrishnan	S.P.Venkatesh	
M A Y	25	Veena Meettiya Vilangukal	Rahman, Madhu, Urvashi	Cochin Haneefa	Shyam	
J U N	1	Apsarassu	Kapil Dev, Jayamadhuri, Jagathy Sreekumar	K. S. Gopalakrishnan		
J U N	1	Noottonnu Raavukal	Kapil Dev, Siddique	Sasi Mohan		
J U N	1	Thazhvaram	Mohanlal, Sumalatha, Salim Ghouse	Bharathan		
J U N	6	Sandhyarani Kolacase				Dubbed film
J U N	6	Superstar	Madanlal, Jagathy Sreekumar, Kalpana	Vinayan		
J U N	6	Rathilayangal	Abhilasha	Kommineni		
J U N	22	Samrajyam	Mammootty, Srividya, Madhu	Jomon		
J U N	28	Nanma Niranjavan Srinivasan	Jayaram, Mukesh, Urvashi	Viji Thampi		
J U L	18	Aalasyam	P. Sukumar, Poonam Dasgupta	P. Chandrakumar		
J U L	19	Pavakkoothu	Jayaram, Parvathy Jayaram, Ranjini	K. Sreekkuttan		
J U L	19	Kalikkalam	Mammootty, Shobana, Lissy	Sathyan Anthikkad		
J U L	20	Kattukuthira	Thilakan, Vineeth, Anju	P. G. Viswambharan		
J U L	20	Aadhi Thaalam	Jayalalitha	Jayadevan		
J U L	27	Ee Kanni Koodi	Sai Kumar, Aswini, Thilakan	K. G. George		
J U L	27	Cheriya Lokavum Valiya Manushyarum	Mukesh, Jagathy, Innocent	Chandrasekharan		
J U L	27	Minda Poochakku Kalyanam	Suresh Gopi, Lizy, Sreenivasan, Mukesh	Alleppey Ashraf		
A U G	10	Rosa I Love You	Innocent, Poonam Dasgupta, Abhilasha	P. Chandrakumar		
A U G	10	Thaalam	Sathar, Shari	T. S. Mohan		
A U G	17	Paadatha Veenayum Paadum	Uma Maheshwari, Raghu, Innocent	Sasi Kumar		
A U G	17	Shankaran Kuttikku Pennu Venam	Vijayan, Rekha, Jagathy Sreekumar	K. S. Sivachandran		
A U G	23	Arhatha	Mohanlal, Rekha, Suresh Gopi	I. V. Sasi		
A U G	23	Nammude Naadu	Lalu Alex, Madhavan Nair, Urvashi	K. Suku		
A U G	25	Gajakesariyogam	Innocent, K. P. A. C. Lalitha, Mukesh	P.G. Viswambharan		
A U G	31	Oliyambukal	Mammotty, Rekha, Jagathy Sreekumar	Hariharan		
A U G	31	Shubhayathra	Jayaram, Parvathy	Kamal		
A U G	31	Thalayana Manthram	Urvashi, Sreenivasan, Jayaram, Parvathy	Sathyan Anthikkad		
A U G	31	Iyer the Great	Mammootty, Geetha, Shobana	Bhadran		
S E P	3	Indrajaalam	Mohanlal, Geetha, Anupam Kher	Thampi Kannanthanam		
S E P	21	Vasavadatta	Poonam Dasgupta, Bablu, Sukumaran	K. S. Gopalakrishnan	Raveendran	
S E P	27	Kuttettan	Mammootty, Saritha, Maathu	Joshi		
S E P	28	Ponnaranjanam		P. R. S. Babu		
O C T	4	Kouthuka Varthakal	Suresh Gopi, Mukesh, Ranjini	Thulasidas		
O C T	5	Saandhram	Suresh Gopi, Parvathy, Innocent	Ashokan-Thaha		
O C T	25	Kuruppinte Kanakku Pustakom	Balachandra Menon, Geetha, Jayaram	Balachandra Menon		
O C T	26	Marupuram	Jayaram, Mukesh, Urvashi, Sukumaran	Viji Thampi		

Title	Director	Screenplay	Cast
Radha Madhavam	Suresh Unnithan	A K Lohithadas	Thilakan, Geetha, Jayaram, Parvathy
Kshanakkathu	T. K. Rajeev Kumar		Niyaz Musaliyar, Parvathy, Thilakan
In Harihar Nagar	Siddique, Lal	Siddique-Lal	Mukesh, Jagadeesh, Siddique, Ashokan, Geetha Vijayan
Champion Thomas	Rex	Jagathy Sreekumar	Jagathy Sreekumar, Sreeja
Keli Kottu	T. S. Mohan		Devan, Shari
Vyooham	Sangeeth Sivan		Raghuvaran, Sukumaran, Urvashi
Ee Thanutha Veluppan Kalathu	Joshiy	P. Padmarajan	Mammootty, Nedumudi Venu, Sumalatha, Lakshmi
Maalayogam	Sibi Malayil	A. K. Lohithadas	Jayaram, Mukesh, Parvathy, Innocent, Murali
Randam Varavu	K. Madhu	John Paul	Jayaram, Rekha
May Dinam	A. P. Satyan		Sai Kumar, Jagathy Sreekumar. Innocent
Lal Salam	Venu Nagavally	Cherian Kalpakavadi	Mohanlal, Murali, Geetha, Urvashi, Rekha
Vidhyarambham	Jayaraj	Sreenivasan	Sreenivasan, Gautami, Nedumudi Venu, Murali
Apoorva Sangamam	Sasi Mohan		Sandhya
Judgement	K. S. Gopalakrishnan		Devan, Ravali
Parampara	Sibi Malayil	S. N. Swamy	Mammootty, Sumalatha, Suresh Gopi
Unnikuttanu Joli Kitti			
Kanninilavu			
Sthreekku Vendi Sthree			
Avalkkoru Janmam Koodi			
Ammayude Swantham Kunju Mary			

== Dubbed films ==
Opening	Title	Director(s)	Original film		Cast	Ref.
Opening	Title	Director(s)	Film	Language	Cast	Ref.
	Sabarimala Sree Ayyappan	Renuka Sharma		Kannada		
23 February	Geethanjali	Mani Ratnam	Geethanjali	Telugu	Nagarjuna, Girija	
