= Sri Krishnarjuna Yuddhamu =

Sri Krishnarjuna Yuddham
- Theatrical release poster
- Directed by: K. V. Reddy
- Written by: Pingali (dialogues)
- Screenplay by: K. V. Reddy
- Story by: Chilakamarti Lakshmi Narasimham
- Based on: Gayopakhyanam (drama)
- Produced by: K. V. Reddy; Pattabhirama Reddy (executive producer)
- Starring: N. T. Rama Rao; Akkineni Nageswara Rao; B. Saroja Devi
- Cinematography: Kamal Ghosh; Ravikant Nagaich
- Edited by: Vasu
- Music by: Pendyala Nageswara Rao
- Production company: Jayanthi Pictures
- Distributed by: Vahini Pictures
- Release date: 9 January 1963
- Running time: 167 mins
- Country: India
- Language: Telugu

Sri Krishnarjuna Yuddhamu (transl. War between Krishna and Arjuna) is a 1963 Indian Telugu-language Hindu mythological film, produced and directed by K. V. Reddy under the Jayanthi Pictures banner. It stars N. T. Rama Rao, Akkineni Nageswara Rao and B. Saroja Devi, with music composed by Pendyala Nageswara Rao. The film was based on the Telugu play Gayopakhyanam written by Chilakamarti Lakshmi Narasimham in 1890. It was later dubbed into Kannada and into Tamil.

== Cast ==
- N. T. Rama Rao as Lord Krishna
- Akkineni Nageswara Rao as Arjuna
- B. Saroja Devi as Subhadra
- Gummadi as Dharmaraju
- Mikkilineni as Balarama
- Kanta Rao as Narada Maharshi
- Dhulipala as Gaya
- V. Nagayya as Akrura
- Mukkamala as Duryodhana
- Satyanarayana as Karna
- Prabhakar Reddy as Lord Shiva
- Allu Ramalingaiah as Brahmachari
- Chadalavada as Ayomayam
- Mahankali Venkaiah as Bhima
- S. Varalakshmi as Satyabhama
- Sriranjani Jr. as Rukmini
- Rushyendramani as Wife of Gaya
- Chhaya Devi as Revati
- Surabhi Balasaraswathi as Chandrika

== Production ==
The film was based on the popular Telugu play Gayopakhyanam written by Chilakamarti Lakshmi Narasimham in 1890. K. V. Reddy also produced the film under the Jayanthi Pictures banner. The film stars N. T. Rama Rao as Krishna and Akkineni Nageswara Rao as Arjuna. Initially, Nageswara Rao was not keen on acting in a mythological film alongside Rama Rao. However, he accepted the role due to his respect towards K. V. Reddy for having directed Donga Ramudu (1955), the maiden venture of his own production house Annapurna Pictures.

== Soundtrack ==
Sri Krishnarjuna Yuddhamu

Film score by Pendyala Nageswara Rao
- Released: 1963
- Genre: Soundtrack
- Length: 32:33
- Producer: Pendyala Nageswara Rao

Music composed by Pendyala Nageswara Rao. Lyrics were written by Pingali.

S. No.	Song title	Singers	length
1	"Anni Manchi Sakunamule"	Ghantasala, P. Susheela	3:24
2	"Aligitiva Sakhi Priya Kalata Manava"	Ghantasala	4:05
3	"Manasu Parimalinchene"	Ghantasala, P. Susheela	4:16
4	"Deva Deva Narayana"	Ghantasala	3:31
5	"Anchelanchalu leni Mokshamu"	B. Gopalam, Swarnalatha	3:03
6	"Chaalada Ee Pooja Devi"	Ghantasala	3:05
7	"Neekai Vechitinayya"	P. Susheela	3:09
8	"Swamula Sevaku Velaye"	P. Susheela	2:37
9	"Tapamu Phalinchina Shubhavela"	Ghantasala	2:21
10	"Veyi Subhamulu Kalugu Neeku"	S. Varalakshmi	3:02

== Reception ==
Sri Krishnarjuna Yuddhamu became a commercial success. It was later dubbed into Kannada and Tamil.

== Bibliography ==
- U. Vinayaka Rao (2012), Telugu Cine Rangam – Pouranika Chitralu, Hyderabad: Telugu Academy
