= Gayopakhyanam =

1890 play by Chilakamarti Lakshmi Narasimham

Gayopakhyanam గయోపాఖ్యానం
- Written by: Chilakamarti Lakshmi Narasimham
- Characters: Gaya; Arjuna; Sri Krishna; Narada; Subhadra; Lord Shiva
- Original language: Telugu
- Subject: Story of Gaya
- Genre: Hindu epic

Premiere
- Date premiered: April 1890

Gayopakhyanam (Telugu: గయోపాఖ్యానం) is a Telugu play written by Chilakamarti Lakshmi Narasimham in 1890. It is also called Prachanda Yadavam (The story of fierce Yadava King - Sri Krishna). This play is the forerunner in presenting mythical themes in the Hindu epics. The plot is based on war between Nara-Narayana, the incarnation of Arjuna and Sri Krishna induced by Gaya, a Gandharva King.

== Author ==
Chilakamarti Lakshmi Narasimham (1867–1946) wrote this play at the age of about 22 years. It was staged for the first time in April 1890. Famous politician Tanguturi Prakasam played the role of Chitralekha and Arjuna and his teacher Immaneni Hanumantha Rao Naidu portrayed the role of Gaya. It was staged innumerable times by many drama troupes.

It was published in 1909 and broke the records of selling more than a lakh copies.

== The Story ==
Gaya, a Gandharva king, while moving across the skies, spits the pan down his divine plane. It falls into the open palms of Sri Krishna, offering prayers to Sun god (Surya). Sri Krishna gets very angry and vows to kill him. Gaya is a great devotee of Krishna. Krishna could not take back his vow. Narada advises Gaya to approach Arjuna and first seek his assurance of protecting him, before revealing about the person set to take his life. As per Narada's advice, the king takes Arjuna's promise for his protection before revealing Krishna's vow to kill him. Arjuna, though surprised, sticks to his word to Gaya. Any number of dialogues between both sides makes no dent in the situation. Intervention of Subhadra, Narada, Rukmini and others fail resulting in direct combat.

When they are almost out for a head-on collision, Lord Siva appears before them and averts a possible disaster to the world. Lord Krishna explains this situation as a test for Arjuna before the impending Mahabharata war.

== Main characters ==
- Gaya, Gandharva King
- Sri Krishna
- Arjuna, One of the Pandavas
- Narada
- Subhadra, Sister of Sri Krishna and wife of Arjuna
- Lord Siva

== Famous poems ==
- Jalanidhu linkugaaka Kulashailamu lEdunu Grunkugaaka
- Alluda Rammani Adarammuna Bilvabampu Maamanu batti Champagalame

== Criticism ==
The criticism that the poet sacrificed the sublime nature of the great characters like Krishna and Arjuna. The poet has natural tendency to dilute the expression, caring more for the common man. He is familiar with the idioms and proverbs familiar to him in the daily life. This may be main reason for the success of his play at root level of the audience.

== Films ==
The story is adopted for films in Telugu and Tamil languages and made as Sri Krishnarjuna Yudham in 1962/1963 and directed by K. V. Reddy. It is starring N. T. Rama Rao as Lord Krishna, Akkineni Nageswara Rao as Arjuna and Dhulipala as Gayudu.
