= Andhra Kesari (film) =

- Theatrical release poster
- Directed by: Vijayachander
- Produced by: Vijayachander
- Starring: Vijayachander; Murali Mohan
- Music by: Satyam
- Release date: 1 November 1983
- Country: India
- Language: Telugu
- Budget: Rs. 18 lakhs

Andhra Kesari (transl. Lion of Andhra) is a 1983 Indian Telugu-language period biographical film written, directed, and produced by Vijayachander. The film is based on the life of Tanguturi Prakasam Panthulu, the first Chief Minister of Andhra State, popularly known by the epithet Andhra Kesari. It is a co-production between Vijayachander and the Government of Andhra Pradesh. Vijayachander plays the title character Prakasam Panthulu, and Murali Mohan plays Kandukuri Veeresalingam. The film touches upon his contributions to the Simon Go Back movement. It was released on 1 November 1983, the Andhra Pradesh State formation day. The film won two Nandi Awards - Best Child Actor for Master Harish and a Special Jury Award for Vijayachander.

== Cast ==
| Character | Actor |
|---|---|
| Tanguturi Prakasam | Vijayachander |
| Kandukuri Veeresalingam | Murali Mohan |
| Chilakamarthi Lakshmi Narasimham | Sridhar |
| Hanumantharao Naidu | J. V. Ramana Murthy |
| Kasinadhuni Nageswara Rao | Singeetam Srinivasa Rao |
| Mahatma Gandhi | Subhash |
| Motilal Nehru | A. V. Raju |
| Pattabhi Sitaramayya | Ekambareswara Rao |
| | Allu Ramalingaiah |
| | Raja Babu |

== Production ==
The idea of making the film on Tanguturi Prakasam came to Vijayachander on the motivation by Tanguturi Anjaiah in one of his speeches, that Government would provide financial assistance to such ventures. After getting the script ready, he met the concerned minister and got his assurance. Later Bhavanam Venkatarami Reddy became the Chief Minister. The Finance Minister Kona Prabhakara Rao gave financial assistance of ₹6 lakh on behalf of the Government of Andhra Pradesh in 1982. There is a melodious song Vedamla Ghoshinche Godavari Amaradhamamla Sobhille Rajamahendri on the historical city Rajamundry.

The film was shot in the house of Jammaganti Hanumantha Rao, Rajahmundry and Hyderabad. The production cost was ₹18 lakh. After the completion, it was released on 1 November 1983, the formation day of Andhra Pradesh state. The film was a financial failure. He could not pay the government completely and instead gave them the film copyrights.

== Soundtrack ==
- Vinara Bharata Veerakumara (Life of Andhra Kesari - Burrakatha

Singer: P. B. Srinivas, S. P. Sailaja, S. P. Balasubrahmanyam)

- Vedamla Ghoshinche Godavari Amaradhamamla Sobhille Rajamahendri (Lyrics: Arudra; Singer: S. P. Balasubrahmanyam)

== Awards ==
Nandi Awards - 1983

- Special Jury Award - Vijayachander
- Best Child Actor - Master Harish
