= Vijayachander =

Indian filmmaker

- Born: Vijayachander Telidevara; 24 May 1939 (age 87); Andhra Pradesh
- Occupations: Actor, Producer
- Years active: 1967–present
- Relatives: Tanguturi Prakasam Pantulu; Tanguturi Suryakumari
- Awards: Nandi Awards

Vijayachander (born Vijayachander Telidevara) is an Indian actor, director and producer, known for his works in Telugu cinema, theatre, and television. Regarded as one of the finest character actor's of Telugu cinema, Vijayachander has appeared in more than forty feature films in a variety of roles.

He was born into a Brahmin family. He is the grandnephew of Tanguturi Prakasam, who served as Chief Minister of Andhra State in 1953–1954, and the nephew of the singer Suryakumari.

Vijayachander is known for his path-breaking works in biographical films; He essayed Jesus of Nazareth in the 1978 film Karunamayudu which he produced, and won the Nandi Award for Best Feature Film; He then enacted his own maternal Grandfather Tanguturi Prakasam Pantulu in the 1982 film Andhra Kesari for which he has received the state Nandi Special Jury Award.

He then essayed Sai Baba of Shirdi in the 1986 classic Sri Shirdi Saibaba Mahathyam which was screened at the International Film Festival of India; In the same year, he appeared as saint Vemana in the hit Vemana Charithra. He enacted the role of Kabir in the 2003 film Kabirdas.

== Career ==
=== Films ===
After a successful career in Telugu theatre, He made his acting debut in the film Sudigundalu (1967), which won the National Film Award for Best Feature Film in Telugu for that year. In 2007, he has donated land for old film artists and Movie Artists Association.

=== Television ===
During 1996 to 1998, he was cast in a 50-episode serial titled Dayasagar, which was telecast on DD National. The series was also dubbed into Telugu, Tamil, Hindi, Malayalam and other languages.

== Selected filmography ==
- Sudigundalu - 1968
- Buddhimantudu - 1969
- Maro Prapancham - 1970
- Rowdy Raani - 1971
- Basthi Bul Bul - 1971...Prakash and Premnath
- C.I.D. Raju - 1971
- Mavoori Monagadu - 1975
- Pasivani Paga - 1975
- Karunamayudu - 1978
- Rajadhi Raju - 1980
- Andhra Kesari - 1983
- Maha Manishi - 1985
- Sri Shirdi Saibaba Mahathyam - 1986
- Sri Vemana Charithra - 1986
- Dayamayudu-1987
- Dharmam Vellum - 1989 (Tamil)
- Police Report (1989 - Telugu)
- Lankeshwarudu - 1989
- Geetaanjali - 1989
- State Rowdy - 1989
- Anna Thammudu - 1990
- Jaitra Yatra - 1991
- Raat - 1992 (Hindi)
- Raatri - 1992
- Pellam Chatu Mogudu - 1992
- Aapadbandhavudu - 1992
- Athma - 1993 (Tamil)
- Naga Jyothi - 1993
- Donga Alludu - 1993
- Mounam - 1995
- Big Boss - 1995
- Bhadrachalam - 2001
- Vachina Vaadu Suryudu - 2002
- Pilisthe Palukutha - 2002
- Kabirdas - 2003
- Ela Cheppanu - 2003
- Pedababu - 2004
- Relax - 2005
- Sada Mee Sevalo - 2005
- Hanumanthu - 2006
- Gamyam - 2008
- Three - 2008
- Aa Okkadu - 2009
- Ratnavali - 2011
- Virodhi - 2011
- Aravaan - 2012 (Tamil)
- Anando Brahma - 2017
- N.T.R: Kathanayakudu - 2019
- 118 - 2019
- Natho Nenu - 2023

== Awards ==
Nandi Awards

- Third Best Feature Film - Bronze - Karunamayudu (1978)
- Special Jury Award - Andhra Kesari (1983)
