= Ganapati (novel) =

1920 novel by Chilakamarthi Lakshminarasimham

గణపతి (Ganapathi)
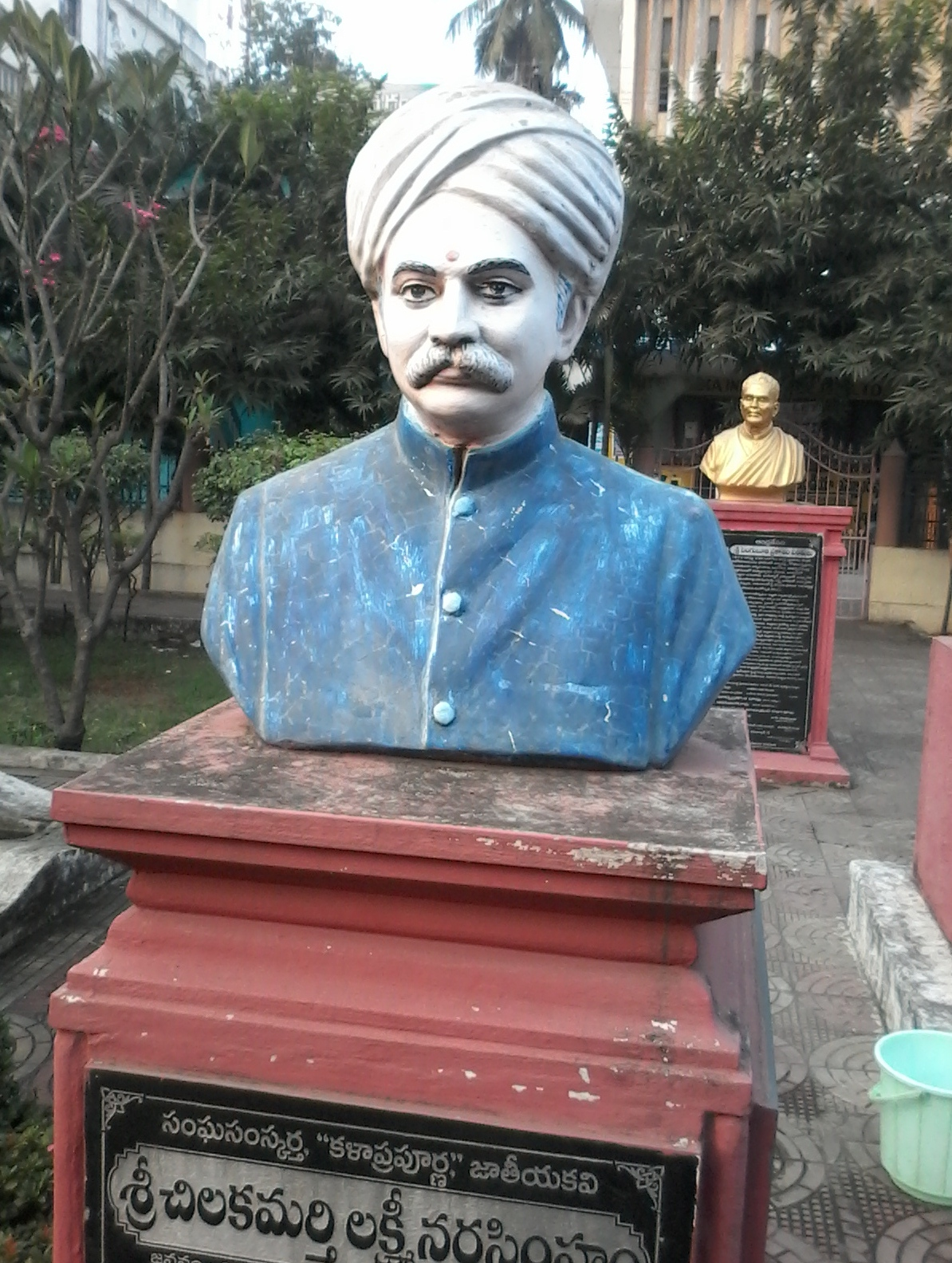
- The cover of the book
- Author: Chilakamarthi Lakshminarasimham
- Original title: గణపతి
- Language: Telugu
- Subject: Life
- Genre: comic novel
- Publisher: Manasa Prachuranalu
- Publication date: 1920
- Publication place: India
- Media type: Print

Ganapati (Telugu: గణపతి) (1920) is a Telugu novel written by Chilakamarti Lakshmi Narasimham. It is one of the first Telugu novels written in modern Telugu and considered among the classic works of modern Telugu literature. It is also considered the first humorous novel in modern Telugu writing.

== Title ==
Ganapathi is the name of the main protagonist. This novel portrays the lives of Ganapathi and his two previous generations (Grandfather and Father).

== Setting ==
The story revolves around various villages in the East Godavari District of Andhra Pradesh, India in the backdrop of social setting in 1910-1920 and satirically criticises the practice of kanyasulkam (Now abandoned/banned practice of groom paying money to the bride's father). Though it sounds comic to read, the underlying truth reflects the acute poverty in Brahmin families.

== Plot ==
The story starts with the narrator attending a marriage and waiting to be served dinner. As it is quite late already, while waiting for the rasam to be served, he dozes off and has a dream.

In the dream he sees a short, fat man who narrates his story and exhorts the narrator to bring it out into the world. It starts with a village in EastGodavari called Mandapalli where Papayya Sastry, the grand father of Ganapathi lives. Papayya faces many difficulties in his village so he go to Pune in Maharashtra, worked in the kingdom of Peshwas and earned some money. He comes back to his native village and married a girl by paying Kanyasulkam. After having a son (Gangadharudu), Papayya dies due to old age.

Gangadharudu (literally means bearer of water in Telugu/Sanskrit) along with his mother migrates to Kakinada, District headquarters of Godavari District. After attaining young age, Gangadharudu starts earning by bringing drinking water to the households from the pond. Though he works all the day, it was difficult for the family to make ends meet. Later Gangaharudu's mother dies. Eventually he was married and soon dies after his son Ganapathi's birth.

Since there is no one to help/take care of them, Ganapathi's mother moves to her brother's village with her kid. In the brother's house though they were given food and shelter they are treated as an additional burden by the brother's wife. Since his childhood Ganapathi amuses the whole village with his bizarre and comic acts like riding donkeys. He left the school in the preliminary level itself. Due to his acts he had to leave the village along with his mother. Then they settled in another village where Ganapathi opens a school for children (Though he himself never got educated properly). The ensuing sequences are full of comedy with village people trying to look for a suitable bride to Ganapathi. Ganapathi's mother goes to a pilgrimage to faraway places along with other village ladies and dies there.

Ganapathi marries a girl by paying kanyasulkam to the bride's father (who actually not the father of the girl) with the help of donations from villagers. But it turns out that the girl was already married earlier. The first husband files a case on Ganapathi along with the self-proclaimed girl's father. To avade the arrest Ganapathi escapes from that village. This novel ends on a funny note with the author comes out of his dream by server pouring hot rasam on his hand in the marriage dinner.

== Characters ==
Important characters of the novel are :

- Papayya
- Gangadharudu
- Ganapathi
- Ganapathi's mother
- Ganapathi's uncle
- Ganapathi's uncle's wife

== Radio adaptation ==
Sthanam Narasimha Rao produced this novel into a radio play with the same name Ganapathi. It was broadcast in the All India Radio in Telugu language during the 1960s and 1970s. It is highly successful in those days with people gathering in groups near the radio sets to listen to this comic play.
