= Police Report =

Police Report may refer to:

- Complaint, formal legal document
- Police Report (TV series), Hong Kong TV series
- Police Report (1934 film), German film
- Police Report (1939 film), German film
- Police Report (1989 film), Indian film
