= Jayaprabha =

Indian critic and poet writing in Telugu (born 1957)

Jayaprabha (born 1957) is an Indian critic and poet writing in Telugu. She is considered a pioneer of the feminist movement in Telugu literary criticism and poetry. Jayaprabha's poetry focusses on women's issues, their problems and strengths and often attacks established gender norms.

== Biography ==
Jayaprabha was born on 29 July 1957. She did her master's degree in Telugu literature and acquired a Ph.D. from Osmania University for her thesis on the progress and status of Telugu drama. She currently lives in Secundrabad.

== Professional career ==
In 1981 Jayaprabha and K. Satyavathi started a feminist monthly Lohita. Her first collection of poems "Yuddhonmukhamga" (Towards War) was published in 1984.

Jayaprabha's second book of poems "Vaamanudi Moodo Paadam" (Third foot of Vamana) was published in 1988. This collection contained two of her landmark feminist poems 'Chupulu' (Stares) and 'Pytani tagaleyyali' (Burn the saree). Chupulu translated as 'looks' or sometimes 'stares' is a poem about the male gaze. It begins with the poet-persona describing the assault of stares she endures daily and ends with the poet hoping for the day when women can return the stares and reclaim public spaces for themselves. In 'Pytani tagaleyyali' (Burn the saree) Jayaprabha equates the saree with confirmity to traditional gender norms and says women must abandon the saree in order to break free from traditional gender norms.

In 1988 Jayaprabha published "Bhava Kavitvamlo Stri" a critique of women in Telugu romantic poetry. The study criticised the representation of women in the works of major male poets. Considered a pioneering work of feminist criticism of Telugu literature, it attracted both controversy and accolades. For a while it was prescribed reading in Bangalore University.

In 1991 another collection of poems "Ikkada Kurisina Varsham, Ekkadi Meghanidi?" (It Rained Here, but Where-from The Cloud?) was published. She also published a revised version of her Ph.D. thesis on Telugu theatre "Naalugo Goda" (Fourth Wall) in the same year.

"Unforeseen Affection And Other Poems" was published in 2005. It contains a selection of her Telugu love poems translated into English by P. V. Narasimha Rao, former Prime Minister of India.

Her poems have also been published in numerous national and international anthologies.

== Selected works ==
=== Poetry ===
- Yuddhonmukhamga (1984)
- Vaamanudi Moodo Paadam (1988)
- Ikkad Kursini Varsham, Ekkadi Maghanidi (1991)
- Unforeseen Affection And Other Poems (2005)
