= Urvashi (disambiguation) =

Urvashi is an apsara (nymph) in Hindu legend.

Urvashi or Urvasi may also refer to:

== People ==
- Urvashi (actress) (born 1967), Indian actress
- Urvashi Butalia (born 1952), Indian feminist and publisher
- Urvashi Chaudhary (born 1986), Indian actress and model
- Urvashi Dholakia (born 1979), Indian television actress
- Urvashi Rautela (born 1994), Indian Bollywood actress, model and beauty pageant titleholder
- Urvashi Sharma (born 1984), Indian Bollywood actress
- Urvashi Vaid (born 1958), Indian-American LGBT rights activist
- Oorvasi S. Amirtharaj, Indian politician
- Urvashi Rai (born 1999), Indian actress and model

== Other uses ==
- Urvashi, a 1990 Indian Malayalam-language film
- "Urvasi Urvasi", a song by A. R. Rahman, Shahul Hameed and Suresh Peters from the 1994 Indian film Kadhalan
- "Urvashi", a 2018 song by Yo Yo Honey Singh
- Vikramōrvaśīyam (Vikram Urvashi), ancient Indian drama by Kalidasa about Urvashi
