= Nee Sirithaal Deepavali =

- Directed by: Malaysia Vasudevan
- Written by: Malaysia Vasudevan
- Produced by: Usha Vasudevan
- Starring: Sivakumar; Harish Kumar; Daisy Sonia; Nizhalgal Ravi
- Cinematography: A. Sabhapathy
- Edited by: V. Rajagopal
- Music by: Ilaiyaraaja
- Production company: Usha Productions
- Release date: 14 December 1990
- Running time: 130 minutes
- Country: India
- Language: Tamil

Nee Sirithaal Deepavali (transl. If you smile, it is Diwali) is a 1990 Indian Tamil-language film directed by Malaysia Vasudevan, in his only directorial credit. The film stars Sivakumar, Harish Kumar and Daisy Sonia, supported by Nizhalgal Ravi and Janagaraj. It was released on 14 December 1990, and failed at the box office.

== Cast ==
- Sivakumar
- Harish Kumar
- Daisy Sonia
- Nizhalgal Ravi
- Janagaraj

== Soundtrack ==
The music was composed by Ilaiyaraaja.

Track listing
No.	Title	Lyrics	Singer(s)	Length
1.	"Kulu Kulu Malare"	Vaali	Malaysia Vasudevan, Mano	4:54
2.	"Oh My Love"	Gangai Amaran	Malaysia Vasudevan	4:47
3.	"Paasam Enum"	Ilaiyaraaja	Ilaiyaraaja	3:18
4.	"Saayangala Sandhiya"	Piraisoodan	S. Janaki, Mano	4:47
5.	"Sinthumani Punnagayil"	Vaali	K. J. Yesudas	5:01
Total length:				22:47

== Release and reception ==
Nee Sirithaal Deepavali was released on 14 December 1990. C. R. K. of Kalki praised the acting of Sivakumar, Janagaraj and Nizhalgal Ravi and added the film's plot is similar to love story of Ambikapathi and Amaravathi and concluded saying the first half of the film is cool, however the latter half is just a masala that goes over the fence. The film failed at the box office, which Vasudevan attributed to the overuse of songs.
