= Rajitha =

Indian actress

- Born: Mallela Rajitha; Kakinada, Andhra Pradesh, India
- Occupation: Actor
- Years active: 1986–present
- Notable work: Pelli Kanuka

Mallela Rajitha is an Indian actress who works in Telugu films. She has been active since the late 1980s.

== Career ==
Rajitha made her debut in film industry at the age of 18 with the Telugu movie, Brahma Rudrulu in which she portrayed Akkineni Nageswara Rao's daughter. She played the role of a widow in Pelli Kanuka and won the Nandi Award for Best Female Comedian. The dialogue writer Posani Krishna Murali stated that her role involved no humour yet the awards committee decided to give Rajitha the award for best comedian.

== Filmography ==
=== Telugu ===
- Brahma Rudrulu (1986)
- Agni Putrudu (1987)
- Thodallullu (1988)
- Maharshi (1988)
- Vivaha Bhojanambu (1988)
- Sahasame Naa Oopiri (1989)
- Mahajananiki Maradalu Pilla (1990)
- Chinnari Muddula Papa (1990)
- Prema Khaidi (1990)
- Atiradhudu (1991) as Kalyani
- Amma Rajinama (1991)
- Rowdy Gari Pellam (1991)
- Coolie No. 1 (1991)
- Agni Nakshatram (1991)
- Sarpayagam (1991)
- Rowdy Gaari Pellam (1991)
- Chinarayudu (1992)
- Mogudugaru (1993)
- Rowdy Mogudu (1993) as Saraswathi
- Jailor Gaari Abbayi (1994)
- Pelli Sandadi (1996)
- Ladies Doctor (1996)
- Jabilamma Pelli (1996)
- Super Heros (1997)
- Subhakankshalu (1997)
- Preminchukundam Raa (1997)
- Abbai Gari Pelli (1997)
- Collector Garu (1997)
- Nayanamma (1997)
- Priyaragalu (1997)
- Pelli Chesukundam (1997)
- Suryavamsam (1998)
- Sivayya (1998)
- Pandaga (1998)
- Subbaraju Gari Kutumbam (1998)
- Pelli Peetalu (1998)
- Ooyala (1998)
- Srimathi Vellostha (1998)
- Premante Idera (1998)
- Yuvarathna Rana (1998)
- Pelli Kanuka (1998)
- Allari Pellam (1998)
- Suprabhatam (1998)
- Abhishekam (1998)
- Swayamvaram (1999)
- English Pellam East Godavari Mogudu (1999)
- Naa Hrudayamlo Nidurinche Cheli (1999)
- Alludugaaru Vachcharu (1999)
- Rajakumarudu (1999)
- Pilla Nachindi (1999)
- Ravoyi Chandamama (1999)
- Postman (2000)
- Manasunna Maaraju (2000)
- Chirunavvutho (2000)
- Vijayaramaraju (2000)
- Uncle (2000)
- Sardukupodaam Randi (2000)
- Narasimha Naidu (2001)
- Budget Padmanabham (2001)
- Preminchu (2001)
- Family Circus (2001)
- Bava Nachadu (2001)
- 6 Teens (2001)
- Akasa Veedhilo (2001)
- Manasantha Nuvve (2001)
- Navvuthu Bathakalira (2001)
- Seema Simham (2002)
- Malli Malli Choodali (2002)
- Allari Ramudu (2002)
- Naga Pratista (2002)
- Indra (2002)
- Sontham (2002)
- Thotti Gang (2002)
- Kabaddi Kabaddi (2003)
- Dongodu (2003)
- Villain (2003)
- Jodi No. 1 (2003)
- Abhimanyu (2003)
- Neeke Manasichaanu (2003)
- Tiger Harischandra Prasad (2003)
- Varsham (2004)
- Malliswari (2004)
- Xtra (2004)
- Valliddaru Okkate (2004)
- 143 (2004)
- Bhadradri Ramudu (2004)
- Soggadi Saradalu (2004)
- Vidyardhi (2004)
- Are (2005)
- Radha Gopalam (2005)
- Relax (2005)
- Prayatnam (2005)
- Sada Mee Sevalo (2005)
- Kanchanamala Cable TV (2005)
- Adirindayya Chandram (2005)
- Okkade (2005)
- Jai Chiranjeeva (2005)
- Lakshmi (2006)
- Kithakithalu (2006)
- Boss (2006)
- Pellaina Kothalo (2006)
- Maharathi (2007)
- Madhumasam (2007)
- Classmates (2007)
- Sri Mahalakshmi (2007)
- Yamagola Malli Modalayindi (2007)
- Chandamama (2007)
- Seema Sastri (2007)
- Vaana (2008)
- Ontari (2008)
- Pelli Kani Prasad (2008)
- Nagaram (2008)
- Bommana Brothers Chandana Sisters (2008)
- Parugu (2008)
- Kathanayakudu (2008)
- Ready (2008)
- Chintakayala Ravi (2008)
- Kotha Bangaru Lokam (2008)
- 1940 Lo Oka Gramam (2008)
- Kuberulu (2008)
- Dongala Bandi (2008)
- King (2008)
- Mitrudu (2009)
- Sankham (2009)
- Ganesh (2009)
- Panchakshari (2010)
- Happy Happy Ga (2010)
- Baava (2010)
- Bindaas (2010)
- Bhale Mogudu Bhale Pellam (2011)
- Aha Naa Pellanta! (2011)
- Teen Maar (2011)
- Mr Perfect (2011)
- Sudigadu (2012)
- Rebel (2012)
- Damarukam (2012)
- Julai (2012)
- Seethamma Vakitlo Sirimalle Chettu (2013)
- Atharintiki Daaredi (2013)
- Bhai (2013)
- Yevadu (2014)
- Aagadu (2014)
- Pilla Nuvvu Leni Jeevitham (2014)
- Bham Bolenath (2015)
- S/O Satyamurthy (2015)
- Lion (2015)
- James Bond (2015)
- Pandaga Chesko (2015)
- Srimanthudu (2015)
- Soukhyam (2015)
- Sarrainodu (2016)
- Supreme (2016)
- Brahmotsavam (2016)
- A Aa (2016)
- Selfie Raja (2016)
- Babu Bangaram (2016)
- Janatha Garage (2016)
- Intlo Deyyam Nakem Bhayam (2016)
- Nenu Local (2017)
- Maa Abbayi (2017)
- Rarandoi Veduka Chudham (2017)
- Duvvada Jagannadham (2017)
- Mahanubhavudu (2017)
- Raja The Great (2017)
- Next Nuvve (2017)
- Bhaagamathie (2018)
- Touch Chesi Chudu (2018)
- Bharath Ane Nenu (2018)
- Nela Ticket (2018)
- Jamba Lakidi Pamba (2018)
- Srinivasa Kalyanam (2018)
- Sailaja Reddy Alludu (2018)
- Savyasachi (2018)
- F2: Fun and Frustration (2019)
- Majili (2019)
- Tenali Ramakrishna BA. BL (2019)
- Prati Roju Pandage (2019)
- Sarileru Neekevvaru (2020)
- V (2020)
- Bangaru Bullodu (2021)
- FCUK: Father Chitti Umaa Kaarthik (2021)
- Gaali Sampath (2021)
- Chaavu Kaburu Challaga (2021)
- Varudu Kaavalenu (2021)
- Manchi Rojulochaie (2021)
- Aadavallu Meeku Johaarlu (2022)
- F3 (2022)
- Swathi Muthyam (2022)
- Macherla Niyojakavargam (2022)
- Urvasivo Rakshasivo (2022)
- Veera Simha Reddy (2023)
- Das Ka Dhamki (2023)
- Custody (2023)
- Usha Parinayam (2024)
- Dhoom Dhaam (2024)
- Akkada Ammayi Ikkada Abbayi (2025)
- Sankranthiki Vasthunam (2025)
- Bhairavam (2025)
- The RajaSaab (2026)
- Nari Nari Naduma Murari (2026)
- Funky (2026)
- Sampradayini Suppini Suddapoosani (2026)

Television

- Lady Detective (1995)

=== Tamil ===
- Kuselan (2008)
- Lingaa (2014)
- Viswasam (2019)
- Annaatthe (2021)
- Custody (2023)
- Chandramukhi 2 (2023)

=== Malayalam ===
- Mouna Daaham (1990)

=== Hindi ===
- Prem Qaidi (1991)

=== Bengali ===
- Moner Majhe Tumi (2002)
