= Aadmi (1993 film) =

- DVD Cover
- Directed by: Arshad Khan
- Written by: Arshad Khan, Santhosh Saroj, Salim
- Produced by: Salim
- Starring: Mithun Chakraborty; Gautami; Harish Kumar; Ajit
- Cinematography: Akram Khan
- Edited by: Waman Bhosle, Gurudutt Shirali
- Music by: Jatin–Lalit
- Production company: Aftab Pictures
- Release date: 1 October 1993
- Running time: 140 minutes
- Country: India
- Language: Hindi

Aadmi (transl. Man) is a 1993 Indian Hindi-language action film directed by Arshad Khan, starring Mithun Chakraborty, Gautami, Harish and Ajit Khan. The film features a score and soundtrack composed by Jatin–Lalit, while Anwar Sagar wrote the lyrics. This film was notable for well known villain Shakti Kapoor's rare positive role of an honest police officer.

== Plot ==
Aadmi is the story of one Vijay M. Srivastav, an honest man. Vijay Srivastav had lived a middle-classed lifestyle in Mumbai along with dad, Mohanlal, mom, Sharda, and a younger brother, Raju. His father and brother managed a restaurant named "Sahiba", while Vijay worked as a Supervisor at the Ordnance Factory that manufacturers RDX for the Government of India and also moonlighted as a self-defense instructor. He met with wealthy Rekha, meanwhile, the only daughter of Advocate Saxena, and they fell in love.

Their respective parents met and arranged their marriage. While his father went to invite Vijay's office boss Trikaal, he witnessed Trikaal 's terrorist activities. Trikaal and his son-in-law, Minister D. P. Singh were involved with anti-state business. They sent two henchmen to kill the Vijay's fanily. In a bomb blast, all three members of Vijay's family were murdered and enraged Vijay was arrested by the police and charged with gangsterism. He was tried in court, found guilty, and sentenced to five years in jail for killing his parents and brother. On his first day behind bars, he is approached by jailor Shamsher Singh as well as DCP Deshmukh, who asks him to cooperate and abduct one Deepak, the son of an underworld don, and if he does so, he will not only aid the police, but his crime will be pardoned and he will be released.

He comes out of jail, abducts Deepak and returns to jail with good faith, but later he realizes that Deepak has nothing to do with any underworld don, but he is the son of an honest man, Heeralal . The whole traps was made by his ex boss Trikaal. Corrupt DCP Deshmukh is working for stabbed Trikaal. Now Vijay fight against bursts out in anger and fled from the jail to destroy all crowd his enemies.

== Cast ==
- Mithun Chakraborty as Vijay M. Srivastav
- Gautami as Rekha Saxena, Vijay's lover
- Harish Kumar as Deepak
- Ajit Khan as Trikaal
- Paresh Rawal as Dhar Pakad aka "D.P." Singh
- Raza Murad as Heeralal
- Vikas Anand as Mohanlal Srivastav, Vijay's father
- Arjun as Nahar Singh ,Trikaal's Goon
- Sulabha Arya as Sharda M. Srivastav, Vijay's mother
- Rakesh Bedi as Usmaan
- Gulshan Grover as DCP Yeshwant Deshmukh
- Shakti Kapoor as I.G. Pratap Singh
- Dalip Tahil as Jailor Shamsher Singh
- Javed Khan as Prison inmate Anand Akela – Barber
- Mushtaq Khan as Public Prosecutor Parvez Khan
- Mac Mohan as Dhar Pakad Singh's assistant
- Anjana Mumtaz as Heeralal's wife
- Jonny Skol Nick as Raji Viswanathan
- Yunus Parvez as Advocate Saxena, Rekha's father.
- Tej Sapru as Goga, Trikaal's goon
- Rana Jung Bahadur as Ashish , Trikaal's goon
- Mahavir Shah as Inspector Arvind Khatre
- Birbal as Traffic Constable Karan
- Bob Christo as John
- Dinesh Anand as Tiwari, Police Official in jail
- Disco Shanti as Dancer

== Soundtrack ==
This album is composed by Jatin-Lalit. Album has 6 songs sung by Kumar Sanu, Kavita Krishnamurthy, Mohammad Aziz, Sadhana Sargam, Udit Narayan, Sujata Goswami & Jolly Mukherjee. Most popular songs in album "Dhak Dhak Dil Mera" sang by Kumar Sanu & Kavita Krishnamurthy.

#	Title	Singer(s)	Lyricist(s)
1.	"Dhak Dhak Dil Mera"	Kumar Sanu, Kavita Krishnamurthy	Anwar Sagar
2.	"Dil Tere Naam Se"	Kumar Sanu, Kavita Krishnamurthy	Rani Malik
3.	"Jaan Se Badhkar"	Kumar Sanu, Sadhana Sargam	P. K. Mishra
4.	"I One Love Four You"	Mohammad Aziz, Udit Narayan, Sujata Goswami	Anwar Sagar
5.	"Main Aashiq Hoon"	Jolly Mukherjee, Kavita Krishnamurthy	Anwar Sagar
6.	"Dingora Dingora"	Kavita Krishnamurthy	Anwar Sagar
