= Peesapati Narasimha Murty =

Indian actor

- Born: 10 July 1920; Vantaram, India
- Died: 28 September 2007 (aged 87); Ramuduvalasa Bobbili
- Occupation: Actor
- Awards: Sangeet Natak Akademi Award (1986); Kala Prapoorna (1983)

Peesapati Narasimha Murty (Telugu: పీసపాటి నరసింహమూర్తి) (10 July 1920 – 28 September 2007) was an Indian actor known for his works in Telugu theatre, and Telugu cinema. He was trained under Kilambi Krishnamacharyulu in 1934 and started his acting career with Rangoon Rowdy in 1938. In 1946, he enacted as Sri Krishna in Pandavodyoga Vijayalu.

He was born in a Vantaram village near Balijipeta, Vizianagaram district in 1920. During his storied career, he received an array of awards such as the Sangeet Natak Akademi Award in 1986. Andhra University honoured him with Kala Prapoorna in 1993.
