= Harish Kumar (actor) =

Indian actor

- Born: Hari; 1 August 1975 (age 51); Hyderabad, India
- Occupations: Film actor Film producer
- Years active: 1979–1983; 1988–2017

Harish Kumar born 1 August 1975 is an Indian actor and film producer. He is known for his works in Telugu and Hindi movies, including Prem Qaidi, Coolie No. 1, Tirangaa, Prema Khaidi, Kranti Kshetra, Ravan Raaj: A True Story and Daisy. He has won two Nandi Awards.

== Career ==
For the film Andhra Kesari, he won the Nandi Award for the best child Actor of the year 1983 from then Chief Minister Late N. T. Rama Rao. He also received special jury award as the best actor in 1996 for the film Oho Naa Pellanta produced by D. Ramanaidu, and directed by Jandhyala. Harish acted as a lead at a young age of 13 in Daisy, a Malayalam film directed by Pratap Pothen. The movie also starred Kamal Haasan. In Tamil, he was introduced by T. Rajendar as a lead in the film Pookkal Vidum Thoothu, directed by Sreedhar Rajan.

In Telugu,he was introduced as a lead actor by producer D. Ramanaidu in the film Prema Khaidi in 1990 with Malashree as the female lead. As the film went on to be a success at the box office, Ramanaidu decided to re-make it in Hindi with Harish as the lead and introduced Karisma Kapoor as the female lead in the film Prem Qaidi in 1991 which did well at the box office. He acted with many Legendary stars of India like N. T. Rama Rao, Akkineni Nageswara Rao, Rajinikanth, Kamal Haasan, Chiranjeevi, Govinda, Mithun Chakraborty, Dharmendra, and Jeetendra. Throughout his career Harish has acted in a total of 280 movies.

== Filmography ==
=== As a child actor ===
Year	Film	Role	Language	Notes
1979	Muddula Koduku	Gopi and Radha's son	Telugu	
1979	Ek Hi Bhool	Sadhana's brother	Hindi	
1981	Seetamalakshmi		Telugu	
1981	Prema Kanuka		Telugu	
1981	Premabhishekam	Devi's brother	Telugu	
1981	Kondaveeti Simham	young Ravi	Telugu	
1982	Trisulam	young Ramu	Telugu	
1982	Naa Desam		Telugu	
1982	Mahasangramam ?	young Krishna	Telugu	
1982	Bari Apurupa Nam Jodi	young Dwarakish	Kannada	
1982	Bhakta Drana Markandeyya	Markamdeyya	Kannada	
1982	Farz Aur Kanoon	young Ravi	Hindi	
1982	Jeevan Dhaara	Babloo	Hindi	
1983	Andha Kanoon	young Vijay Kumar Singh	Hindi	
1983	Prem Tapasya	Shankar	Hindi	
1983	Amarajeevi		Telugu	
1983	Ananda Bhairavi		Telugu; Kannada	
1983	Andhra Kesari	Prakasam	Telugu	
1984	Srimadvirat Veerabrahmendra Swami Charitra	Young Veerabrahmendra Swamy	Telugu	
1984	Bharatamlo Sankharavam		Telugu	
1985	Donga	Young Phani	Telugu	
1985	Haqeeqat	Gopal	Hindi	
1986	Rendu Rellu Aaru		Telugu	
1987	Sansar	Vidya Sagar	Hindi	
1988	Super Boy 3D		Kannada	
2022	Pratibimbalu		Telugu	Shot in 1982; delayed release

=== As an adult actor ===
==== Telugu ====
Year	Film	Role	Notes
1988	Vivaha Bhojanambu	Krishna	
1988	Neerajanam		
1988	O Bharya Katha	Shankaram	
1989	Raktha Kanneeru	Hari	
1990	Prema Khaidi	Chandran "Chandu"	
1991	Amma		
1991	Madhavayya Gari Manavadu	Vamsi Krishna, Vamsi Mohan	dual role
1991	Prema Panjaram	Srikanth	
1992	Pelam Chepite Vinali	Hari	
1992	Rowdy Inspector	Gandhi	
1992	College Bullodu	Raja	
1992	Yugala Getham		
1992	Pranadaata	Narendra kumar	
1992	Prema Vijetha	Raju	
1993	Evandi Aavida Vachindi	Achchi Babu	
1993	Inspector Jhansi		
1993	Manavarali Pelli	Seenu	
1994	Kurradi Kurradu		
1994	Bangaru Kutumbam	Hari	
1994	Jailor Gaari Abbayi	Rambabu	
1994	S.P. Parshuram	Parshuram's brother	
1995	Kondapalli Rathaiah		
1996	Oho Naa Pellanta	Hari and Soundarya	dual roles in male and female version
1997	Super Heroes		
1997	Gokulamlo Seetha	Bhaskar	
1999	Daddy Daddy	Prasad	
2001	Railway Coolie		
2007	Pellaindi Kaani	Sivaji	

==== Hindi ====
Year	Film	Role	Notes
1991	Prem Qaidi	Chandra Mohan	
1992	Tirangaa	Sanjay Chauhan	
1993	Zakhmo Ka Hisaab		
1993	Zakhmi Rooh		
1993	Inspector Jhansi		
1993	Aadmi	Deepak	
1994	Kranti Kshetra	Harish Ashok Kumar Mangatrao	
1994	The Gentleman		
1994	Phoolan Devi	Tarika	
1995	Ravan Raaj: A True Story	Harish Verma	
1995	Aashique Mastane	Sohan/Rohan (dual role)	
1995	Jawab	Ravi A. Saxena	
1995	Janam Kundli	Sunny R. Kapoor	
1995	Gaddaar	Vijay Saxena	
1995	Coolie No. 1	Deepak	
1996	Bhishma	Sub-Inspector Abhimanyu Verma	
1996	Army	Kishan	
1996	Muqadama	Dancer (song "Naya Maal")	
1997	Shapath	Rahul	
1997	Gundagardi	(in song Saila Saila)	
1997	Hero No. 1	Meena's prospective husband	
1998	Chhota Chetan	Rajkumar	
1998	Aunty No. 1	Abhyankar	
1999	Phool Aur Aag	Cameo in song "Main Gaaon Dil Gaaye"	
1999	Nyaydaata	Rahul	
2000	Bulandi	Nakul (Arjun's brother)	
2001	Inteqam	Vijay Kumar Singh	
2011	Naughty @ 40	Sandeep Srivastav/Sandy	
2012	Chaar Din Ki Chandni		
2018	Aa Gaya Hero		

==== Malayalam ====
Year	Film	Role	Notes
1988	Daisy	Pradeep Menon	
1989	Ivalente Kamuki		
1989	Aayiram Chirakulla Moham		
1990	Sthreekuvendi Sthree		
1990	Apoorva Sangamam		
1990	101 Ravukal		
1990	Mouna Daaham		
1991	Teenage Love		
1991	Vasyam		
1995	Shilpi		
2006	Out of Syllabus		
2008	De Ingottu Nokkiye		
2025	Thalavara		

==== Tamil ====
Year	Film	Role	Notes
1987	Pookkal Vidum Thoothu	Hari	credited as Hariharan
1990	Vellaiya Thevan		credited as Harish
1991	Nee Sirithaal Deepavali	Murali	
1991	Gnana Paravai	Giri	

==== Kannada ====
Year	Film	Role	Notes
1993	Hendthi Helidare Kelabeku	Kumar	
1997	Laali		
2001	Vande Matharam		

== Awards ==
Nandi Awards

- 1983 - Best Child Actor - Andhra Kesari (1983)
- 1996 - Special Jury Award - Oho Naa Pellanta
