= Prem Qaidi =

- Theatrical release poster
- Directed by: K. Murali Mohana Rao
- Written by: Dr. Rahi Masoom Reza (dialogue)
- Story by: Paruchuri Brothers
- Based on: Prema Khaidi by E. V. V. Satyanarayana
- Produced by: D. Rama Naidu
- Starring: Harish; Karisma Kapoor; Dalip Tahil; Paresh Rawal
- Cinematography: K. Ravindra Babu
- Edited by: K. A. Marthand; B. Satyam; Krishna Reddy Madhav
- Music by: Anand–Milind
- Production company: Suresh Productions
- Release date: 21 June 1991
- Country: India
- Language: Hindi

Prem Qaidi (Prisoner of Love) is a 1991 Indian Hindi-language musical film written by and directed by K. Murali Mohana Rao. The film stars Karisma Kapoor (in her debut), Harish, along with Dalip Tahil, Paresh Rawal, Asrani, Shafi Inamdar and Bharat Bhushan.

The film is a remake of the 1990 Telugu film Prema Khaidi, by E. V. V. Satyanarayana and marked the feature film debut of the actress Karisma Kapoor, the first actress from the Kapoor family. Karisma was 16 when acting in this film, while her co-star Harish was 15.

== Plot ==
While saving his employer Kasturi Prasad's (Dalip Tahil) life, Suryanath (Bharat Bhushan) loses his legs. In appreciation, Kasturi allows Chandramohan (Harish Kumar), Suryanath's son, to work in his home. Kasturi's daughter Neelima (Karisma Kapoor) initially makes fun of and teases Chandra, but soon falls in love with him. Kasturi is against this union and sends henchmen to attack Chandra, which results in their murdering Suryanath during the melee. The young Chandra is convicted of the crime and is sent to a youth detention center as punishment. The head jailer tortures Chandra, but Superintendent Prabhavati (Rama Vij) understands his emotions and love for Neelima and intercedes. She tries to reunite the two lovers.

== Cast ==
- Harish as Chandramohan
- Karisma Kapoor as Neelima
- Dalip Tahil as Kasturi Prasad
- Paresh Rawal as Prabhavati's Husband
- Rama Vij as Superintendent Prabhavati
- Bharat Bhushan as Suryanath
- Shafi Inamdar as Jailor
- Harish Patel as Kasturi's Henchman
- J. D. Chakravarthy as Prabhavati's Son
- Anjana Mumtaz as Mrs. Kasturi Prasad
- Asrani as Pandit
- Ali as Prisoner in Youth Detention Center
- Narsing Yadav as Driver
- Rajitha as Neelima's Friend

== Soundtrack ==
Prem Qaidi

Soundtrack album by Anand–Milind
- Released: 1991
- Genre: Feature film soundtrack

Song	Singer
"Antakshari" (Extracts from several songs)	S. P. Balasubrahmanyam, Kavita Krishnamurthy
"Arey Logon Zara Dekho"	S. P. Balasubrahmanyam, Kavita Krishnamurthy
"I Live For You, I Die For You"	S. P. Balasubrahmanyam, Kavita Krishnamurthy
"Tere In Galon Pe Ka Kha Ga Gha"	S. P. Balasubrahmanyam, Kavita Krishnamurthy
"Hum Hain Prem Qaidi"	S. P. Balasubrahmanyam, Kavita Krishnamurthy
"Priyatama O Meri Priyatama"	S. P. Balasubrahmanyam, Sadhana Sargam
