= Prema Khaidi =

- Theatrical release poster
- Directed by: E. V. V. Satyanarayana
- Screenplay by: E. V. V. Satyanarayana
- Story by: Paruchuri Brothers
- Produced by: D. Ramanaidu
- Starring: Harish; Malashri; Sharada
- Music by: Rajan–Nagendra
- Production company: Suresh Productions
- Release date: 1990
- Country: India
- Language: Telugu

Prema Khaidi (/ˈpreɪmə ˈkaɪði/ transl. Prisoner of love) is a 1990 Indian Telugu-language romantic drama film directed by E. V. V. Satyanarayana starring Harish, Malashri, Sharada. It was Satyanarayana's first film. The film was dubbed in Tamil as Vaazhnthal Unnoduthan in 1991. The film was remade in Hindi as Prem Qaidi in 1991 with Harish reprising his role. It was also remade in Kannada with the same name in 2002.

== Plot ==
The film begins with Chandram entering jail upon conviction of murdering his own father. He starts drawing the picture of a girl on the walls of his cell. When the jailor notices this and makes some obscene comments on the girl, Chandram confronts him. The jailor severely beats him up and sends him to solitary confinement. Meanwhile, a new Superintendent, Prabhavati takes charge of the jail. A girl named Neelima comes to visit Chandram, but the police do not allow her in. When he sees her, he escapes to meet her. But Neelima's servants try to grab her along with them. Chandram follows their vehicle. Police think that he is escaping and open fire, he gets injured. Prabhavati sends him to the hospital for treatment. In the hospital, some goons try to kill him before Prabhavati comes and thwarts their attempt. When Prabhavati inquires about the incident, he narrates his story.

Chandram's father used to work for Bapineedu. He loses both his legs when trying to save Bapineedu in an accident. Chandram's father requests Bapineedu to give him some job to earn a livelihood, to which he reluctantly agrees. Chandram meets Neelima in her birthday party and spoils her plan to fool her friends. She bets with her friends that she would make him love her. She tries to tease him many times, but Chandram tries to be within his limits, knowing the difference of the status of their families. Once, Neelima forces him to drink alcohol and Bapineedu thinks that he is misbehaving with his daughter. He is thrown out of the house, but does not utter a word of complaint about her. This made her realize that she is in true love with him. She seeks the permission of her father to marry Chandram. Bapineedu pretends to accept their love and secretly sends his goons to kill Chandram. They ended up killing Chandram's father and put the blame on Chandram. Prabhavati is moved by his story and promises him to help to win his love.

== Cast ==
- Harish Kumar as Chandran "Chandu"
- Malashri as Neelima
- Sharada as Prabhavati
- P. L. Narayana as Chandram's father
- Gokina Rama Rao as Bapineedu
- Jaya Prakash Reddy as K. K. Rao
- Giri Babu as Prabhavati's husband
- Tyagaraju as Bapineedu's henchman
- Brahmanandam as priest
- Babu Mohan as Devudayya
- Ali as Prisoner
- Uttej as Prisoner
- Prudhviraj
- Rajitha as Neelima's friend
- Ironleg Sastri as assistant priest
- Jenny as Registrar of marriages

== Production ==
After his previous film Chevilo Pullu, failed at the box-office, Sathyanarayana did not receive enough opportunities to direct. Ramanaidu then approached him to do a film for his company and gave him a script to offer his feedback to which Sathyanarayana felt it needed some changes and he wrote seventeen versions of that script for nine months which became Prema Khaidi.

== Soundtrack ==
The song "Nee Kallalo Sneham" is based on duo's own Kannada song "Nee Bandare Mellane" from Mooru Janma.

All lyrics are written by Veturi; all music is composed by Rajan–Nagendra.

Track listing
No.	Title	Singer(s)	Length
1.	"Nee Kallalo Snehamu"	P. Susheela, S. P. Balasubrahmanyam	5:12
2.	"I Live For You"	S. P. Balu, K. S. Chithra	4:57
3.	"Tittiba Gattiga"	P. Susheela, S.P. Balu	4:57
4.	"O Na Maha"	P. Susheela, S.P. Balu	5:02
5.	"O Priya Priya"	S.P. Sailaja, P. Susheela, S. P. Balu	5:58
6.	"Jodikadithe Bedeela"	S. P. Balasubrahmanyam	5:49
Total length:			31:55

== Reception ==
Reviewing the Tamil-dubbed version, The Indian Express wrote the film "is abrasive in the manner in which it generates its conflicts, but has a degree of craftsmanship".

== Awards ==
- Malashri won Nandi Award for Best Supporting Actress (1990)
