= Maha Manishi =

1985 Telugu action drama film by M. Balaiah

- Directed by: M. Balaiah
- Written by: M. Balaiah; Tripuranenu Maharathi
- Produced by: U. Suryanarayana Babu
- Starring: Krishna; Jaya Prada; Radha
- Cinematography: Pushpala Gopi Krishna
- Edited by: Kotagiri Gopala Rao
- Music by: J. V. Raghavulu
- Production company: Padmavathi Films
- Release date: 14 November 1985
- Country: India
- Language: Telugu

Maha Manishi (transl. Great Human) is a 1985 Indian Telugu-language action drama film co-written and directed by M. Balaiah starring Krishna, Jaya Prada, Radha and Jaggayya. The film has musical score by J. V. Raghavulu.

== Cast ==
- Krishna as SambhuPrasad & Raja
- Jaya Prada
- Radha
- Jaggayya
- Prabhakara Reddy
- Giribabu
- Sudhakar as Chandra naidu
- Suttivelu
- Prasad Babu
- Raj Varma
- Tyagaraju
- Bheemaraju
- Mallikarjuna Rao
- Vijayachander
- Jyothi Lakshmi
- Samyuktha
- Annapurna

== Music ==
The soundtrack album scored and composed by J. V. Raghavulu comprised 6 tracks.

1. "Chitteluka Chitteluka" — Madhavapeddi Ramesh, P. Susheela
2. "Choopulu Choopulu" — K. J. Yesudas, P. Susheela
3. "Dee Dee Dee" — P. Susheela, Madhavapeddi Ramesh
4. "Evarunenu Evarunenu" — K. J. Yesudas, P. Susheela
5. "Gumma Gumma" — S. Janaki
6. "Muddo Voo Vaddu" — Raj Sitaraman, S. Janaki
