= Karunamayudu =

- Directed by: A. Bhimsingh; Fr. Christopher Coelho OFM
- Written by: Fr. Christopher Coelho, O.F.M. Modukuri Johnson (dialogues)
- Produced by: Vijayachander and Rev. Louis F. Knoll, STBC
- Starring: Vijayachander; Sreedhar Surapaneni
- Cinematography: K. S. Prasad
- Edited by: Paul Doraisingh
- Music by: Joseph Krishna; B. Gopalam
- Distributed by: Radha Chitra
- Release date: 21 December 1978
- Running time: 160 minutes
- Country: India
- Language: Telugu

Karunamayudu (transl. Man of Compassion/The Compassionate One; also commonly known as Ocean of Mercy from its titles in other languages) is a 1978 Indian Telugu-language biographical film written and directed by A. Bhimsingh. It stars Vijayachander as Jesus of Nazareth. The film won two Nandi Awards, was notable for two song sequences narrating the Birth of Jesus and Entry into Jerusalem, the film was screened at the International Film Festival of India.

It was followed by Dayamayudu (1987), starring Vijayachander as Saint Paul, which can considered as a sequel to Karunamayudu. A Hindi television series titled Dayasagar aired on DD National, the national public broadcaster, in the 1990s with Vijayachander reprising the role of Jesus Christ.

== Cast ==
- Vijayachander as Jesus
- Vennira Aadai Nirmala as Mary Magdalene
- A. Bhimsingh as Judas Iscariot
- Chandra Mohan as Bartimaeus, the Blind man
- Jaggayya as Pontius Pilate
- Surekha as Mary
- Rajasulochana
- Sumalatha
- Mukkamala
- Mikkilineni
- Dhulipala
- Raja Babu
- Padmanabham
- Giri Babu as Apostle John
- Sreedhar
- Tyagaraju
- Mada Venkateswara Rao

== Production ==
The film was originally set to be called Raraju Kristu (Christ the King, possibly inspired by Cecil B. DeMille's The King of Kings) and gained some funding from the Roman Catholic Church in South India.

== Songs ==
- "Devudu Ledani Anakunda" (Singer: S. P. Balasubrahmanyam)
- "Kadile Muvvala Sandadilo" (Singer: Vani Jayaram)
- "Kadilindi Karuna Radham" (Singer: S. P. Balasubrahmanyam)
- "Paripoorna Kreestu"
- "Puvvulakanna Punnami Vennelakanna" (Singer: V. Ramakrishna)

== Reception ==
The film reportedly performed well at the box office in its initial run.

=== Role in Evangelism in India ===
Directed and produced in India, with all-Indian actors, Karunamayudu was seen by many missionaries as one of the most culturally relevant tools for Christian evangelism in India. In India, many of the villagers encounter a story that they are unfamiliar with: the Life of Christ. The gospel is rendered in their cultural context when the film is shown. The film was not considered evangelical upon release, but American evangelicals later promoted the film in India as an evangelical tool. According to Dayspring International, a ministry founded to propagate the film, Karunamayudu was dubbed into 14 Indian languages by 2012.

== Other language titles ==
=== Dubbed ===
- Hindi - Daya Sagar (Ocean of Mercy)
- Tamil - Karunamoorthy (The Compassionate One)
- Kannada - Dayasagara (Ocean of Mercy)
- Malayalam - Mishihaacharithram (History/Story of the Messiah/Jesus)

== Awards ==
Nandi Awards

- Third Best Feature Film - Bronze - Vijayachander
- Best Screenplay Writer - Modhukuri Jhonson
