= Chandrasekharan =

Chandrasekharan is a South-Indian first name and surname. Notable people include:

- E. Chandrasekharan (born 1948), Indian politician
- Guru Chandrasekharan (1916–1998), Indian dancer and choreographer
- K. S. Chandrasekharan (1920–2017), Indian number theorist
- Kottakkal Chandrasekharan, Indian dancer
- M. R. Chandrasekharan (1929–2024), Indian literary critic and author
- Salem Chandrasekharan, Indian film producer
- T. P. Chandrasekharan (1960–2012), Indian politician
- Natarajan Chandrasekaran (born 1963), chairman of Tata Sons
