= Police Report (1989 film) =

Indian Telugu-language mystery thriller film

- VCD Cover
- Directed by: Hari Anumolu
- Screenplay by: Hari Anumolu; Uppalapati Narayana Rao
- Story by: Hari Anumolu
- Dialogues by: Malladi Venkata Krishnamurthy
- Produced by: Sunkara Madhumurali; Mandava Gopalakrishna
- Starring: Naresh; Mohan; Vijayachander; Rallapalli; Tanikella Bharani; Mallikharjuna Rao; Kota Srinivasa Rao
- Cinematography: Hari Anumolu
- Edited by: B. Lenin; V. T. Vijayan
- Music by: Gangai Amaran
- Distributed by: Viswamitra Art Creations
- Release date: 15 September 1989
- Running time: 114 minutes
- Country: India
- Language: Telugu

Police Report is a 1989 Indian Telugu-language mystery thriller film written and directed by Hari Anumolu starring Naresh, Mohan, and Vijayachander in pivotal roles. Police Report was released on 15 September 1989, to positive reviews, and later gathered cult following.

== Plot ==
Sales manager Srinivas (Mohan) and his wife Lakshmi, a school teacher (Rajyalakshmi), go on a holiday to Horsley Hills. During their stay, Lakshmi mysteriously disappears one night. A seemingly worried Srinivas searches for her everywhere but fails to find any trace. He then files a missing person police report at the local police station.

The case is assigned to Sub Inspector Naresh (Naresh), a laid back officer. As part of the investigation, Naresh questions Srinivas and examines the circumstances surrounding Lakshmi's disappearance. Soon after, Srinivas receives information from Father Johnson (Vijayachander), stating that Lakshmi is staying safely at his church.

When Srinivas goes to the church, he is shocked to see a strange woman (Ranjini), claiming to be Lakshmi. However, he insists that she is not his wife. Despite his claims, the woman confidently introduces herself as Lakshmi and recalls personal details from their married life. Sub Inspector Naresh finds that available evidence supports the woman's identity and not Srinivas's version of events.

As the investigation continues, more people identify the woman as Lakshmi. Parvatheesam, a veterinary doctor (Potti Prasad), and others who know the family confirm her identity. Inspector Rekha who assists Naresh in the case, closely observes Srinivas and finds his behaviour suspicious.

To gather deeper information, Naresh takes help from private detective Battala Satti (Mallikharjuna Rao) and his assistant Alauddin (Tanikella Bharani). Their inquiry reveals that Srinivas had recently taken out a large insurance policy in Lakshmi's name. Further clues point to inconsistencies in Srinivas's financial records and movements during the holiday. A tour guide (Kota Srinivasa Rao) provides crucial information that raises doubts about Srinivas's intentions on the night Lakshmi disappeared.

Based on mounting circumstantial evidence, Srinivas is arrested on suspicion of murdering his wife. However, Sub Inspector Naresh continues his investigation and uncovers the shocking truth. It is revealed that Srinivas murdered the real Lakshmi at Horsley Hills for insurance money. To escape suspicion, he arranged fake missing complaint of Lakshmi using rehearsed behaviour. In the final revelation, Naresh exposes the entire investigation, and Srinivas confesses to the crime and gets arrested.

== Cast ==
- Naresh as Sub Inspector Naresh
- Mohan as Sales Manager Srinivas and Lakshmi's husband
- Rajyalakshmi as Teacher Lakshmi and Srinivas's missing wife
- Vijayachander as Retd S. P. a.k.a. Father Jhonson
- Ranjini as Inspector Rekha a.k.a. Srinivas's missing wife
- Rallapalli as Gangadhar Dange (Constable Maganubava)
- Mallikharjuna Rao as Battala Satti Private Detective
- Tanikella Bharani as Alauddin Assisant detective
- Potti Prasad as Dr. Parvatheesam
- Kota Srinivasa Rao as Tour Guide
- Silk Smitha special appearance in the song "Vugey Yadha"
- Dham as Forensic photographer
- Krishnasastry Nischala
- Narayana Varma
- Hemasunder
- Sathrajith
- Gandi Satyanarayana

== Production ==
The films was shot in Horsley Hills, Andhra Pradesh, and production design was helmed by K. L. Dhar.

== Soundtrack ==
All lyrics are written by Sirivennela Seetharama Sastry.

No.	Title	Singer(s)	Length
1.	"Chikkave Maina"	S.P. Balasubrahmanyam
2.	"Tinnava Kaja"	S. Janaki
3.	"Sagani Raga Leela"	S.P. Balasubrahmanyam, S. Janaki
4.	"Ooge Yada"	Mano, S. Janaki
