= Matsyapuri =

- village
- Interactive map of Matsyapuri
- Location in Andhra Pradesh, India Matsyapuri (India)
- Coordinates: 16.48144°N 81.626744°E
- Country: India
- State: Andhra Pradesh
- District: West Godavari

Population
  - Total: 5,123

Languages
  - Official: Telugu
- Time zone: UTC+5:30 (IST)
- PIN: 534207
- Telephone code: 08814
- Nearest city: Narsapur
- Sex ratio: 1000:989 ♂/♀
- Literacy: 72%
- Lok Sabha constituency: Narsapur
- Vidhan Sabha constituency: Bhimavaram

Matsyapuri is a Major village in the Veeravasaram mandal of the West Godavari district, near Narsapur, in Andhra Pradesh, India.

== Demographics ==
As of 2001 India census, Matsyapuri had a population of 5,123. Males constitute 51% of the population and females 49%. Matsyapuri has an average literacy rate of 72%, higher than the national average of 59.5%: male literacy is 78%, and female literacy is 71%. In Matsyapuri, 11% of the population is under 6 years of age.
