= Kottakkal Chandrasekharan =

Kathakali artiste (1945–2019)

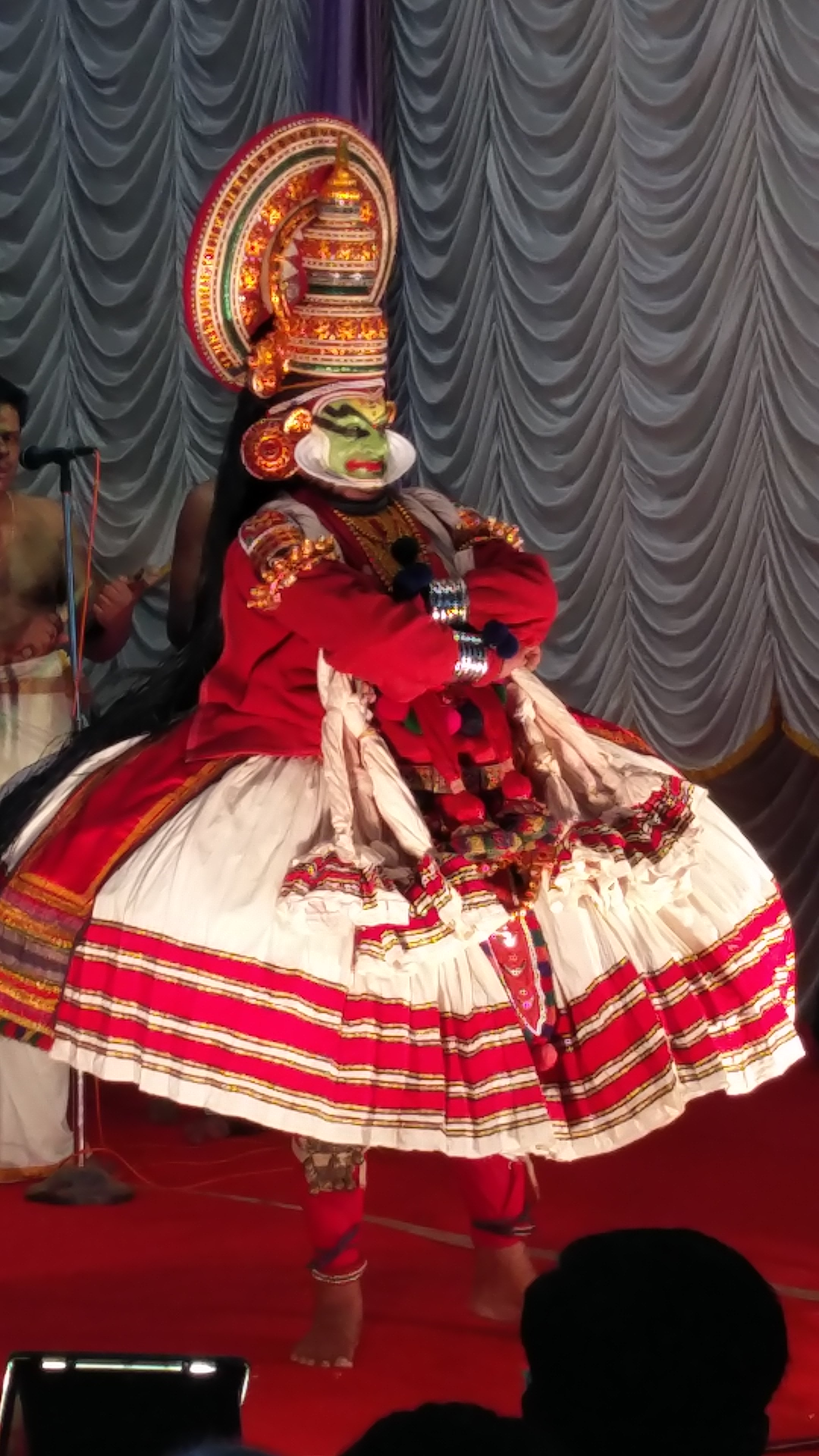
Kottakkal Chandrasekharan as Arjunan in March 2017

Kottakkal Chandrasekharan (15 January 1945 – 4 September 2019) was a senior Kathakali artiste known for his portrayal of the virtuous pachcha and anti-heroic Kathi roles in the classical dance-drama from Kerala in south India.

== Life ==
Born at Naduvattam near Pattambi in Palakkad district in 1945, he was a disciple of Padma Shri Vazhenkada Kunchu Nair and Kottakkal Krishnankutty Nair. His father was A.M. Kumaraswami Bhattathiripad and mother was P.V. Parukkutty Warassiar.

Chandrasekharan, who was a product of PSV Natyasangham in Kottakkal, was its principal since 1996 and was noted for his portrayal of roles like Nalan, Bahukan, Bhiman, Arjunan, Ravanan, Duryodhanan and Keechakan. He performed Kathakali in temples and clubs of Kerala and participated in 'Kathakali Mahotsavam', Asiad (1982) and other places of India like Delhi, Bombay, Calcutta, Surat, Bangalore, Bhopal, Andhra Pradesh (Puttaparthy) and Madras. He performed in Loka Malayala Mela, Festival of India (UK in 1983, specially invited by British Council), foreign countries like Malayasia, Singapore, Indonesia (Ramayana Mela), China, Korea, Hong Kong and Switzerland.

He won the Central Sangeet Natak Akademi award. He received many other awards, consolation prize from Eranakulam Kathakali Club in 1963, Vazhenkata Kunchu Nair Award (Kollam), V.S. Sarma Endowment (Kerala Kalamandalam), Thulaseevanam Award of 1990 (Thiruvananthapuram), Alappuzha District Kathakali Club Award, S.B.T. Arya Circle Award (Kottakkal), etc. and also received the Honourship of 'Natyathilakam' and Veerasrunkhala in 1994 from Rajarajeswari Temple, Thaliparambu.
