= Sthanam Narasimha Rao =

Indian actor

- Born: 23 September 1902; Bapatla, India
- Died: 21 February 1971 (aged 68)
- Other name: Sthanam
- Known for: Satyabhama
- Awards: Sangeet Natak Akademi Award (1961); Padma Shri (1956)

Sthanam Narasimha Rao, popularly known as Sthanam (23 September 1902 – 21 February 1971), was an Indian actor known for his works in Telugu theatre and Telugu cinema. He was known for playing female characters and was a recipient of a Padma Sri Award. His depiction of the Sringara rasa as Satyabhama in Srikrishna tulabharam kept audiences spellbound. Equally enchanting performances in Roshanara, Deva Devi in Vipranarayana and the eponymous Chintamani made his place in Telugu theater permanent. His most memorable acting, however, was as Madhuravani in Gurajada Appa Rao's comedy Kanyasulkam.

Sthanam had over 1,500 performances to his credit. His productions of classics on All India Radio include Kanyasulkam and Ganapati. He acted in Telugu films such as (Radhakrishna in 1939 and Satyabhama in 1941) and authored a book about his vast acting experience entitled, Natasthanam. He wrote the song 'Meerajalagalada' in the movie 'Sri Krishna Tulabharam'. He was felicitated in Rangoon and gifted golden crown in 1938. His Shashthipurti was grandly celebrated in 1962 at Hyderabad.

== Early life ==
He was born in 1902 at Bapatla of Bapatla district to Hanumantha Rao and Ademma. He entered the theatre in 1920 and, rigorously trained by Veeraraghava Swamy, played for the Rama Vilasa Sabha of nearby Tenali. For nearly four decades (1924–60).

== Death ==
He died in 1971.

== Awards ==
- He was recipient of Padma Shri from Government of India in 1956.
- He received the Sangeet Natak Akademi Award for Acting in 1961.
- He received Gajarohanam in Chennai
