= Mouna Daaham =

- Directed by: K Radhakrishnan
- Produced by: J. V. Rukmangadhan
- Starring: Harish Kumar
- Edited by: V. G. Ambalam; K. Ravi
- Music by: Sangeetharajan
- Production company: Chandrathara Cine Arts
- Distributed by: Chandrathara Cine Arts
- Release date: 1990
- Country: India
- Language: Malayalam

Mouna Daaham is a 1990 Indian Malayalam film, directed by K. Radhakrishnan. The film has musical score by S. P. Venkatesh. It was awarded an A (restricted to adults) certificate by the censor board.

== Cast ==
- Harish Kumar
- Kalaiselvi
- Prathapachandran
- Kakka Ravi
- Syamala
- Rajitha

== Soundtrack ==
The music was composed by Sangeetharajan and the lyrics were written by Poovachal Khader.

No.	Song	Singers	Lyrics	Length (m:ss)
1	"Ee Raavil"	Unni Menon	Poovachal Khader	
2	"Nillu Nillu Penne"	Unni Menon	Poovachal Khader	
