= Aadhi Thaalam =

- Directed by: Jayadevan
- Written by: Jayadevan
- Screenplay by: Jayadevan
- Produced by: K. Prasannakumar
- Starring: Jayarekha, Jayalalitha
- Cinematography: S. Balraj
- Edited by: C. Mani
- Music by: Navas
- Production company: Karthika Movies
- Distributed by: Karthika Movies
- Release date: 1990
- Country: India
- Language: Malayalam

Aadhi Thaalam is a 1990 Indian Malayalam film, directed by Jayadevan and produced by K. Prasannakumar. The film has musical score by Navas.

== Cast ==
- Jayarekha
- Jayalalitha

== Soundtrack ==
The music was composed by Navas and the lyrics were written by Poovachal Khader.

No.	Song	Singers	Lyrics	Length (m:ss)
1	"Hridayam Oru Chashakam"	K. S. Chithra	Poovachal Khader	
2	"Thottaal Viriyum"	K. J. Yesudas	Poovachal Khader	
