= Daisy (1988 film) =

- Promotional poster
- Directed by: Prathap K. Pothan
- Written by: Prathap K. Pothan; Khalid
- Produced by: Babu
- Starring: Harish Kumar; Sohni; Lakshmi; Kamal Haasan
- Cinematography: Ashok Kumar
- Edited by: B. Lenin; V. T. Vijayan
- Music by: Shyam
- Production company: Thomsun Films
- Release date: 19 February 1988
- Country: India
- Language: Malayalam

Daisy is a 1988 Indian Malayalam-language musical-romance film depicting teenage love, separation, and longing set in a boarding school in Ooty. It was written and directed by Prathap K. Pothan. It stars Harish and Sonia, along with Lakshmi and Kamal Haasan in pivotal roles. The screenplay was written by Prathap Pothan and the dialogues were written by Khalid. Daisy was one of the highest grossing Malayalam films of 1988. The film is mainly centralized on teenagers; it took nine years in Malayalam cinema to overcome this record with teens, which is Aniyathipravu.

== Plot ==
Pradeep Menon is a troubled teenager who studies in a Boarding school in Ooty in the Nilgiris. He is regarded as a trouble-maker and is often punished by his teachers and headmaster, severely at times. When the beautiful Daisy Thomas joins the school; he makes fun of her on her first day, thus beginning a series of misadventures that result in more punishment for him. Although this brings him close to Daisy, and they are attracted to each other.

Daisy tries to help Pradeep. She is shocked to see how rude he is towards his mother, Malathi Menon, but is unable to do anything about it. She later learns the reason behind his hatred is that his mother had decided to remarry after his father's death and started spending less time with him.

Things improve considerably when Malathi is confined to a hospital and Pradeep starts visiting her, thereby improving their relationship. Pradeep starts to respond positively to Daisy's help and is all set to turn a new leaf. Then Pradeep's world is turned upside down when he witnesses Daisy in the arms of James. Shocked at this, Pradeep regresses to his self-destructive ways, alienating himself from everyone.

He later, learns that James is Daisy's older brother and that she is terminally ill. Things take a dark turn and his mother passes away, he also soon loses Daisy. The movie ends with him finding solace in James.

== Cast ==
- Harish Kumar as Pradeep Menon
- Sohni as Daisy Thomas
- Lakshmi as Malathi Menon
- M. G. Soman as Balakrishna Menon
- Nedumudi Venu as Pradeep's uncle
- Kamal Haasan as James Kuttichan (Daisy's brother)
- Sankaradi as Teacher
- Lalu Alex as Ravi
- Thesni Khan as Classmate of Daisy and Pradeep
- Captain Raju as Headmaster
- Renny Johnson as John (Pradeep friend)
- Subbu Panchu Arunachalam as Thoma
- Jagathy Sreekumar as Tamil Postman
- Jagannatha Varma as Daisy's Father
- Smitha Salim

== Soundtrack ==
Daisy

Soundtrack album by Shyam
- Genre: Feature film soundtrack
- Length: 20:25
- Language: Malayalam
- Label: EMI

The film music was composed by Shyam, the lyrics were written by P. Bhaskaran.

Track list
No.	Title	Artist(s)	Length
1.	"Ormathan Vasantha"	K. J. Yesudas
2.	"Pookale"	K. S. Chithra
3.	"Rapadithan"	K. S. Chithra
4.	"Thenmazayo"	Krishnachandran
5.	"Laalanam"	K. J. Yesudas
