= Chilakamarti Lakshmi Narasimham =

Indian writer (1867–1946)

- Born: 26 September 1867; Khandavalli, West Godavari district
- Died: 17 June 1946 (aged 78)
- Citizenship: India
- Education: Mission School, Veeravasaram
- Writing career
- Pen name: Chilakamarti Punnaiah
- Genres: Playwright, novelist, poet
- Notable work: Gayopakhyanam
- Notable awards: Kala Prapoorna

Chilakamarti Lakshmi Narasimham (26 September 1867 – 17 June 1946) was an Indian playwright, novelist and author of short stories, who wrote in the Telugu language. He was a romantic and a social reformer in the tradition founded by Veeresalingam. His plays include Gayopakhyanam (1909) and Ganapati (1920).

Narasimham was visually impaired since his youth, and became blind after his graduation. He nonetheless served as an instructor in Telugu at the Government Arts College in Rajamahendravaram. He was active in the Indian independence movement; he eschewed "foreign cloth" and wore khādī dhoti, shirt, coat and turban.

== Early life ==
Chilakamarti Lakshmi Narasimham was born on 26 September 1867 in a Dravida Brahmin family of Aaraama Dravidulu sect. He was born at Khandavalli village in West Godavari district at the residence of his maternal uncle. His father's name is Chilakamarti Venkanna and mother's name is Venkataratnamma and were residents of Veeravasaram village in West Godavari district.

Narasimham's earlier name was Punniah and was later named after a popular temple deity Lakshmi Narasimha Swamy of Antarvedi village. According to his autobiography, his aunt's daughter Punnamma died after giving birth to a child. Narasimham's mother saw her in her dream and was asked to name Narasimham after her. Later, Narasimham's father and paternal grand mother did not like the name and changed it.

As a boy, he was said to resemble his maternal grandfather, Bhadraiah Sastry who died a year before the grandson was born. His body, height, tonal quality, poetic talent, together with a sort of purblindness (sic) where all inherited from the grandfather. Due to his partial blindness, he had trouble walking alone in the nights and was unable to read during nights. He was unable to see the numbers written on the blackboard and unable to catch ball while playing. He used to take help from his friends who used to read aloud the school lessons for him.

At the age of five, his Upanayanam, the sacred thread ceremony was performed. His father tried a lot to make Narasimham learn Sandhyavandanam by sending him to his grandfather's village Khandavalli, his aunt's villages Velagadurru and Manchili. Finally, he stayed in Matsyapuri village near Veeravasaram for several months and learned Trikaala Sandhyavandanam.

== Literature ==
Kandukuri Veeresalingam is considered an architect of the Renaissance of Telugu literature in the later half of the nineteenth century. Due to his work as a social reformer, he is often looked upon by the people as a reformer more than as a pioneer in modern Telugu literature. As a writer, he was the first to try his hand at many modern literary forms such as the minor poem, burlesque, biography, autobiography, novel, satire, farce and plays. If Veeresalingam was the path-finder in this respect, Chilakamarti was a torch-bearer along the path, as the former went on breaking new grounds. Both were versatile writers in verse and prose. The literary output of both was voluminous. There was practically no genre left untouched by them except in one or two spheres.

The earliest work Keechaka vadha, a stage play, was written in 1889; the last work Bammera Potana, an incomplete play, was written in 1946, the year in which Chilkamarti died. Another incomplete play Harischandra was also probably written in 1946. The works of Chilkamarti can be broadly classified into verses, plays, Prahasanas, novels, long stories and biographies of great men and autobiography.

=== Verses ===
The earliest verses were written by him in the year 1887 on the occasion of the golden jubilee celebrations of Queen Victoria's rule. A number of extempore verses and verses recited at several meetings come under one category. Satakas (containing not less than hundred verses) come under another category. If the verses written for plays are also taken into consideration, they form a third category. In 1910, he wrote in Telugu verses, a concise Ramayana of Valmiki.

=== Plays ===
His plays could be classified into two categories. The first category is the independent and the original, though the theme was borrowed from the classical and epic poems. The second category is translations from Sanskrit plays.

==== Original Plays ====
1. Keechaka Vadha – 1889
2. Droupadi Parinayamu – 1889
3. Sri Rama Jananamu – 1889
4. Gayopakhyanamu/Prachanda Yadavam – 1890
5. Parijatapaharanamu – 1890
6. Nala Natakamu – 1890
7. Seetha Kalyanamu – 1890
8. Prasanna Yadavamu – 1905
9. Prahlada Charitamu – 1907
10. Chatura Chandrahasa – 1907
11. Tilottama – 1907

==== Incomplete Plays ====
1. Bammera Potana – 1946
2. Harischandra – 1946

==== Plays Translated from Sanskrit ====
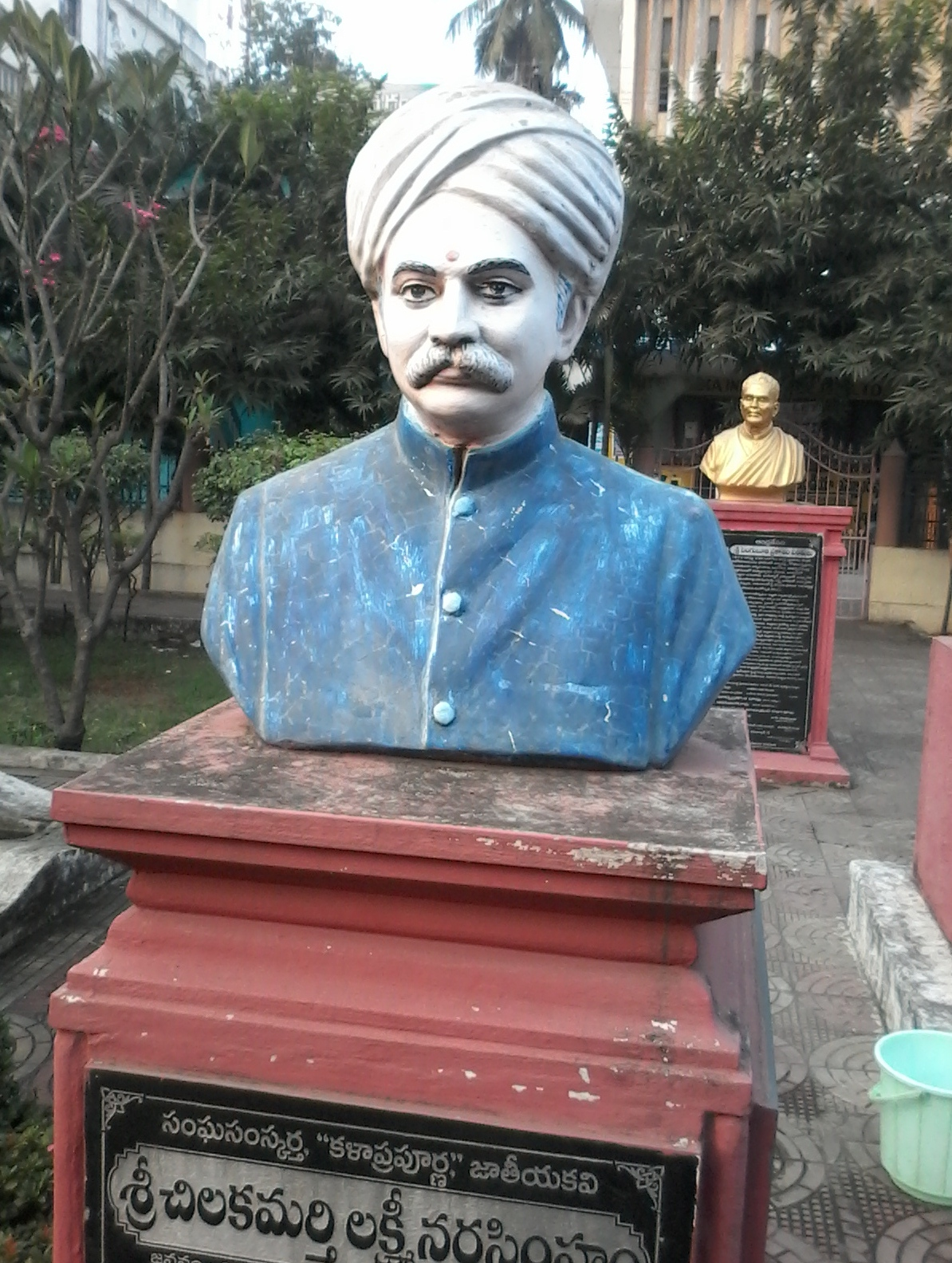
Chilakamarthi Lakshmi Narasimham's statue at Swatantra Samara Yodhula Park (Freedom Fighters' Park), Rajamahendravaram

1. Parvathi Parinayamu of Bana – 1899
2. Bhasa Natakachakram – 1909–1927
3. Dula Vakyamu
4. Karna Bharamu
5. Duta Ghatotkachamu
6. Uru Bhangamu
7. Madhyama Vyayogamu
8. Pancha Ratnamu
9. Pratijna Yougandharayanamu
10. Swapna Vasavadattamu
11. Bala Charitamu
12. Charudattamu
13. Avimarakamu
14. Pratima
15. Abhishekamu

=== Novels ===
Chilakamarti wrote original novels as well as translated English novels. His novels mainly consisted of either social themes or epic themes.

Ramachandra Vijayam (1894), Ganapathi (1981–21), Rajaratnam (1918–21) and Vijayalakshmi are purely social novels.

Hemalatha (1896), Ahalyabai (1897), Krishnaveni (1911), Karpoora Manjari (1907–27), Mani Manjari (1911), Suvarna Guptudu and Shapamu are historical novels, while Soundarya Tilaka is partly of the epic content. Chilakamarti is called Andhra Scott after the famous Scottish historical novelist Walter Scott.

Chilakamarti translated two English novels written by Bengali author Ramesh Chandra Dutt, The Lake of Palms and The Slave Girl of Agra under the titles Sudha Saraschandram(1909–27) and Dasikanya respectively. Shyamala is another novel written by Chilakamarti based on the Macbeth play of William Shakespeare.

=== Stories ===
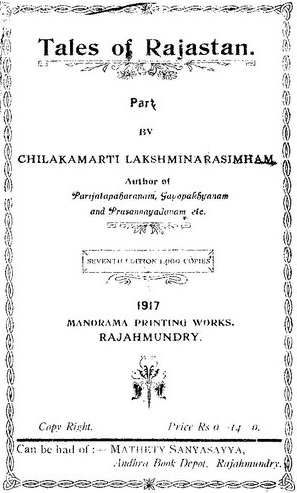
Rajasthana-Kathavali, 1917 English cover page.

He translated the book The Annals and Antiquities of Rajasthan or the Central and Western Rajpoot States of India by Colonel James Tod under the title Rajasthana Kathavali around 1906–07. It consisted of twenty four stories of the royal dynasties of Rajasthan published in two volumes.

=== Biographies ===
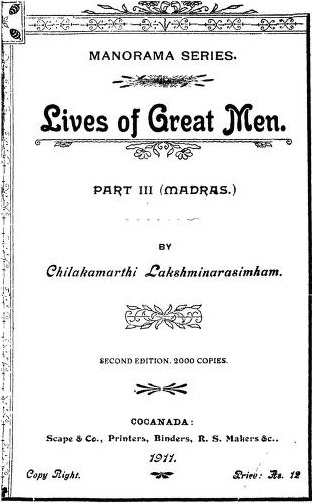
Mahapurushula-Jeevitamulu, English title page.

=== Autobiography ===
At the request of his friends, despite his blindness and old age (75 years), Chilakamarti wrote his 646 pages long autobiography Sweeyacharitamu in 4 months and 24 days from 18 March 1942 to 12 July 1942. Due to his lack of sight and unavailability of written records, he recollected his entire life story from memory which included very detailed incidents, dates and people names. With all his modesty, he apologises to the readers for having written his autobiography for which he does not consider himself to be worthy. According to,

=== Saraswathi Monthly Magazine ===
Chintamani monthly magazine started by Nyapathi Subbarao moved to Chennai when Veeresalingam left Rajamahendravaram. Therefore, Chilakamarti thought that there should be a good monthly magazine in Andhra. He conveyed the same to Polavaram zamindar Kochcherlakota Ramachandra Venkata Krishna Rao Bahadur. On his approval, Chilakamarti started "Saraswathi" monthly magazine in Rajamahendravaram. Krishna Rao Bahadur acted as editor and Chilakamarti worked as sub-editor.

=== Manorama Monthly Magazine ===
In 1906, Chilakamarti started "Manorama" monthly magazine.

=== Desamatha Weekly Magazine ===
"Towards of end of 1909, I thought that along with the Manorama monthly magazine, a weekly magazine should also be started"
