= Apoorva Sangamam =

- Directed by: Sasi Mohan
- Produced by: Chaithanya Arts
- Music by: Jerry Amaldev
- Release date: 1990
- Country: India
- Language: Malayalam

Apoorva Sangamam is a 1990 Indian Malayalam film directed by Sasi Mohan and produced by Chaithanya Arts. The film has musical score by Jerry Amaldev.

== Cast ==
- Hareesh
- Karan
- Kuthiravattam Pappu
- Mala Aravindan
- Krishnankutty Nair
- Kollam Thulasi
- Sivaji
- Jagannathan
- Kaladi Jayan

== Soundtrack ==
The music was composed by Jerry Amaldev and the lyrics were written by Puthiyankam Murali.

No.	Song	Singers	Lyrics	Length (m:ss)
1	"Koove Koove"	Sujatha Mohan	Puthiyankam Murali	
2	"Ummathan Poovu Virinju"	K. S. Chithra, Unni Menon	Puthiyankam Murali	
