= Telugu theatre =

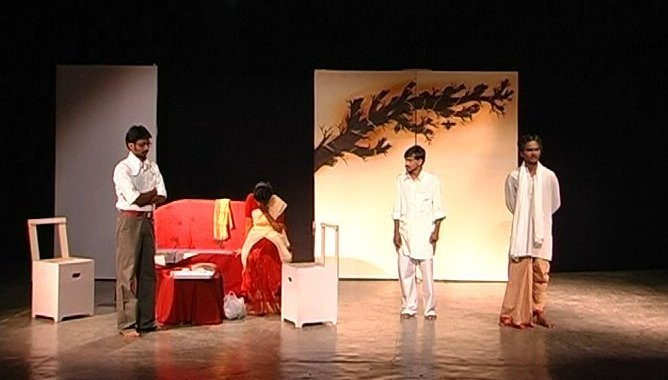
- "Prasna" a play directed by Murali Basa at University of Hyderabad, written by Gollapudi Maruthi Rao
- Type: Theatre group
- Location(s): Andhra Pradesh; Telangana
- Key people: Film, Television and Theatre Development Corporation

Telugu theatre is Indian theatre performed in the Telugu language, based in the states of Andhra Pradesh and Telangana. Gurajada Apparao's 1892 play Kanyasulkam is often considered the greatest play in the Telugu language. C. Pullaiah is cited as the father of the Telugu theatre movement.

Vemuri Gaggaiah was an important member of the Mylavaram Bala Bharathi Nataka Samajam in Mylavaram, Krishna district during 1913–28. Through "Mylavaram Theatre", Gaggaiah became a household name for his mythological roles. Tirupati Venkata Kavulu have dramatised several of the Hindu epics into dramas and plays consisting of singable verses set to perfect meter. Several of their plays, especially pandavodyogavijayalu have been widely known among many drama clubs and audiences across Andhra Pradesh. The Nandi Natakotsavam Awards are awarded every year by the Government of Andhra Pradesh for achievements in Telugu theatre.

== Associated figures ==
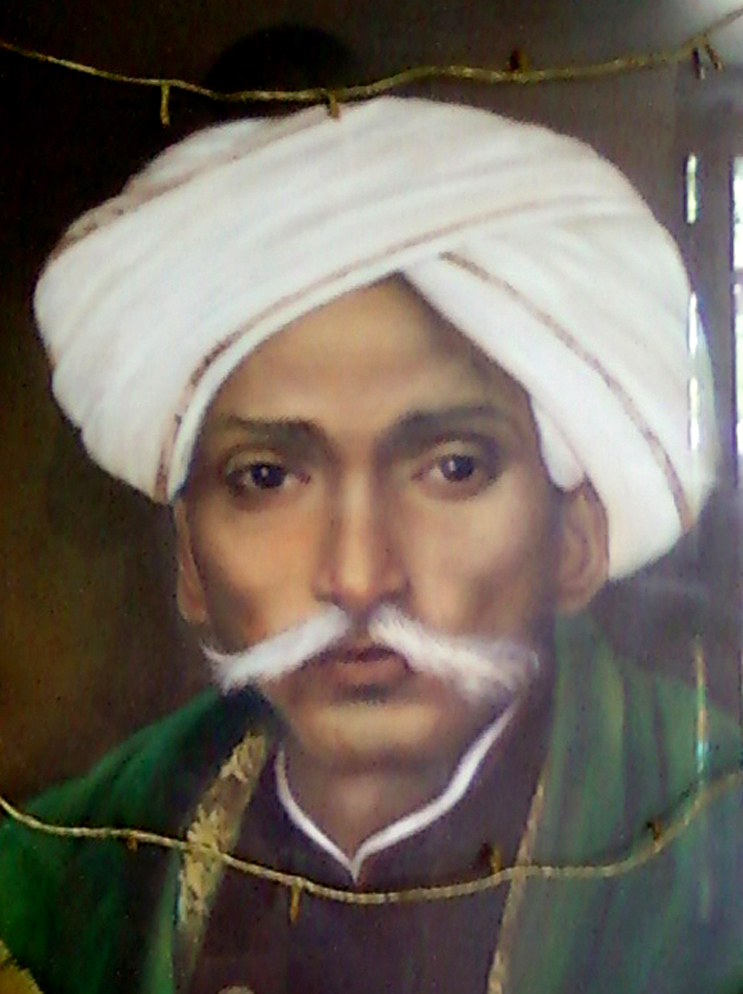
Gurazada Apparao

Vedam Venkataraya Sastry in his play "Bobbili Yuddham"*

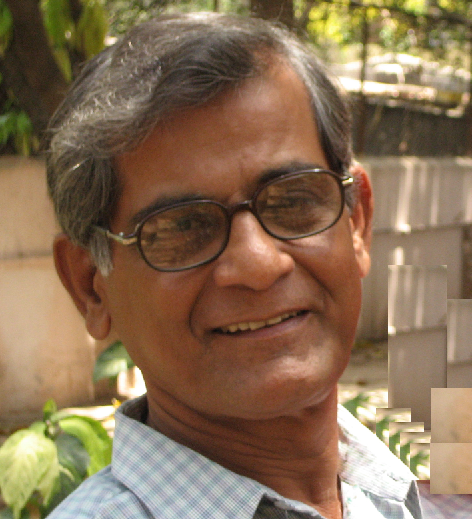
S. K. Misro is one of the pioneers of modern Telugu social theatre, and has received six state Nandi Awards.

Kalyanam Raghuramaiah was a recipient of the Sangeet Natak Akademi Award, and the Padmashri. He was known for the roles of Krishna or Dushyantha, Bhavanisankar, Narada etc. He performed those roles for about 60 years. He indulged in elaborate raga alapana, based on different ragas while rendering padyams. One of the finest method actors, he had the ability to sing padyams and songs through whistle, by putting his finger in mouth and producing the whistle or flute sound (meaning Eela in Telugu). He has acted in various dramas and gave more than 20,000 stage performances. He was called the "Nightingale of the Stage" by Rabindranath Tagore Balijepalli Lakshmikantam was a dramatist remembered for the masterpiece Harischandra (Satya Harischandriyamu) written in 1924.

Peesapati Narasimha Murty was trained under Kilambi Krishnamacharyulu in 1934 and started his acting career with Rangoon Rowdy in 1938. In 1946, he enacted as Sri Krishna in Pandavodyoga Vijayalu. He won the prize as best Sri Krishna in the "Akhilandhra Pandava Udyoga Vijayalu" competitions held in 1949 at Guntur. Sthanam Narasimha Rao was well known for playing stunning female characters and was a recipient of a Padma Sri Award. His depiction of the Sringara rasa as Satyabhama in Srikrishna tulabharam kept audiences spellbound. Equally enchanting performances in Roshanara, Deva Devi in Vipranarayana and the eponymous Chintamani made his place in Telugu theater permanent. His most memorable acting, however, was as Madhuravani in Gurajada Appa Rao`s comedy Kanyasulkam. Sthanam had over 1,500 performances to his credit. His productions of classics on All India Radio include Kanyasulkam and Ganapati. He acted in Telugu films such as (Radhakrishna in 1939 and Satyabhama in 1941) and authored a book about his vast acting experience entitled, Natasthanam. He was felicitated in Rangoon and gifted golden crown in 1938.

V. Nagayya was closely connected to Rama Vilasa Sabha, a cultural association in Chittoor. He performed several stage plays, such as Sarangadhara, Viswamithra Chitra Nilayam, Savitri, Bruhannala and Ramadasu, and staged the roles of Telugu saint-poets Pothana, Vemana, Ramadasu, and Tyagaraja. Banda Kanakalingeshwara Rao was a member of Kendriya Sangeet Natak Akademi since 1952 and Andhra Pradesh Sangeet Natak Akademi since 1957. Gollapudi Maruti Rao's volume of essays on theatre, Telugu Nataka Rangam, was prescribed as a textbook for the Department of Theatre Arts, Andhra University, Visakhapatnam (1967). He published two research articles appeared in Andhra Vignana Sarvaswam (Telugu Encyclopedia) 11th volume: "History of the development in 'Thought' and 'Technique' of Telugu Play-writing" and "Amateur Theatre – its origin and growth in relation to the World Amateur Theatre movement. His Telugu play Vandemaataram, the first one in Telugu about the Sino-Indian War, was published by Andhra Pradesh State Information & Public Relations Department, (1963). Aatreya's works on social reform, transformation and universal peace, include his 10 Natakams (plays) and 15 Natikas, which include Bhayam ("Fear"), Viswa Shanti ("Universal Peace"), Kappalu ("Frogs"), Goutama Buddha, Ashoka Samrat, Parivartanam, Edureeta and Tirupati.

Rathna Shekar Reddy is a theatre artist from Telangana, and an alumnus of the Lee Strasberg Theatre and Film Institute. best known for his critically acclaimed theatre productions like Purushotham, Dominic Wesley, Last Wish Baby, Gregor Samsa etc. His body of work includes The Imaginary Invalid, Fiddler on the Roof, Purushotham, Wait Until Dark, The Last Wish Baby. Reddy conducts theatre workshops which run full, produces and directs plays for both Samahaara and institutions like schools, colleges, corporates and others. in which he plays a negative lead, Antha Scene Ledu, lead in the award-winning Naa Bangaaru Thalli and others.

Through Samahaara, he has organized workshops and training programs that give young performers in Hyderabad a place to develop and showcase their work Other theatre groups in the city have credited him and Samahaara's annual Hyderabad Theatre Festival with increasing audience interest in drama. Local theatre practitioners have also cited his grassroots workshops as a factor in the growth of theatre in Hyderabad.

The group Samahaara under the guidance of Rathna Shekar Reddy is credited with making theatre popular and involving the young crowd in Hyderabad. Their most significant contribution to the Theatre of India, apart from their original productions, has been organizing four editions of The Hyderabad Theatre Festival, namely The Hyderabad Theatre Festival 2009, The Hyderabad Theatre and Short-Film Festival 2010 and the Samahaara Hyderabad Theatre and Rock Music Festival 2011. and the Hyderabad Theatre Festival 2012. The Festival has been instrumental in bringing together the various amateur and professional theatre groups in Hyderabad and improving the quality and scale of the plays. The platform of HTF as it is abbreviated has been a great boost for theatre groups in Hyderabad.

Murali Basa is an alumnus from Department of Theatre Arts, University of Hyderabad. He is a well known theatre Lighting Designer. He was awarded Kandukuri Visishta Puraskaram for the year 2017. He designed for the plays like Macbeth, A straight Proposal, Love ka over Dose, Metro Metro, Rudrama. His contribution to theatre is appreciable. He is currently working as an Assistant Professor Drama at Department of Performing Arts, Assam University.

== Kinds of theatre ==
- Telugu theatre is having its roots from almost 2nd century BCE. The theatre of Telugu can be divided into various kinds. The major kinds are Folk theatre, Padya Natakam, Parishath natakam, Gadyanatakam or social plays, the prayoga natakam or experimental plays and the Street theatre.
- Folk Theatre .. Telugu people who lives in both the states of Telangana and Andhra Pradesh having very rich folk Theatrical Traditions. Chindu Bhagavatham or Chindu yakshaganahese kind of forms. research scholars like Dr. Bhikshu and others proved that there somany theatrical elements in these forms.

Chindu bhagavatam or yakshaganam : this is eminent Folk theatre form of Telangana state. there were thousands of scripts written for the performance of chindu. there are two major traditions in chindu Yakshaganam. one is traditional art for the sake of the cast related rituals. and the other one is occasional performances for entertainment. This tradition is being performed by chindu madigas who are dependent cast people of madiga community. chindu madigas plays the cast myths Adi jambapuranam and yellamma katha for the rituals of their cast. for entertainment they play myths folk tales and histarical subjects. chervirala Bhagayya was one of the prominent writer who wrote more than 100 yakshaganas. chindu yellamma gaddam narendar gaddam srinivas shindu shyam aresome of the prominent performers of the chindu yakshaganam.

== Padya Natakam ==
As it is started from the Padya Natakam, The people of Telugu Theatre used to render the poems for a long time. Plays like 'Satya Harischandra', 'Kurukshetram', 'Gayopaakyanam' are the well known plays. poems like "chelliyo chellako". " Bava eppudu vachiteevo" are used to render by the every common man in every part of the village. The actors used to sing these many more times.

The interesting feature in Telugu theatre is the main roles are cast by two persons and named as "okatava (first)" "rendo (the second)", for example okatava krishnudu (first krishna), rendava krishnudu (second krishna). Most of the performances start at late nights and will continue till early mornings.

== Parishat Natakam ==
Parishat is a traditional theatre event conducted annually at different places in Andhra Pradesh. It spans about three to four days having a competition of plays for the Parishatnatakam groups spread across the state. The present baseline study reveals that fifty one Parishats were conducted in Andhra Pradesh during the year 2011 and out of them, 41 Parishats have been conducted in coastal region of Andhra Pradesh. Though only 10 Parishats are situated in the other parts of Andhra Pradesh.

== Gadya Natakam ==
After staging the play vyvahara Dharma Bhodhini of veereselingam in 1890, the scenario of Telugu theatre has changed. Most of the writers have started writings on the socio-economic problems raised in society. They have also written political satire. The comedy play like 'Chintamani" is an all-time favorite of Andhra people.

The other most important feature in the Telugu theatre is "Parishid Play". These Parishid plays have taken place for the improvements in Telugu theatre and lead to a realistic movement rather than the normal epic stories happened before that time. The parishid also established a realistic movement of Telugu theatre. As against the existing tradition of musical plays i.e. padya natakam, it pleaded for socially relevant theatre. To achieve this, it held annual competitions regarded as a touch stone of artistic excellence, insisting that only social or one-act drama within the previous five years was eligible to participate and that women should enact female roles. The time factor of 1hr is also another important factor in these parishid plays.

== Prayoga Natakam or Experimental Drama ==
This is a differient kind of plays written and performed by various plays. major place for these kind is educational institutes like universities and the colleges where the theatre is a part of their education.

== Major contributors ==
- Banda Kanakalingeshwara Rao, actor, Akademi winner
- Chilakamarthi Lakshmi Narasimham, playwright
- Gurazada Appa Rao, playwright
- Gollapudi Maruthi Rao, playwright, actor
- Mudigonda Lingamurthy, actor
- Kota Srinivasa Rao, actor
- Peesapati Narasimha Murty, thespian, Akademi winner
- Pendyala Nageswara Rao, actor, singer and music director
- Aarudra, playwright
- Puvvula Suri Babu, actor and singer
- Rushyendramani, actress
- Sthanam Narasimha Rao, actor, Akademi winner
- Surabhi Kamalabai, actress
- T. Kanakam, actress and singer
- Tanikella Bharani, playwright, actor
- Srinivas Avasarala, playwright, director, actor
- Tirupati Venkata Kavulu, playwright
- Vedam Venkataraya Sastry, playwright
- Yadavalli Suryanarayana, actor
- Athaluri Vijayalakshmi, playwright
- Deerghasi Vizai Bhaskar, playwright, Sangeet Natak Akademi Awardee

== Other Contributors ==
- Pranayraj Vangari: Director, actor, chief secretary of "Popcorn Theatre" group.
