= Nandi Awards of 1979 =

Awards hosted annually for Telugu Cinema

Annual Awards for Telugu Cinema which is known as Nandi Awards has been given by State Government. "Nandi is Bull" of Lord Shiva.

- Best Feature Film -:Sankarabharanam
  - Golden Nandi with a cash prize of Rs. 10,000 to the Producer/Banner
  - Cash prize of Rs. 4,000 to the Director
- List of winners of the Nandi Award for Best Second Feature Film|Best second Feature Film: Maa Bhoomi
  - Silver Nandi with a cash prize of Rs. 3,000 to the Producer/Banner
  - Cash prize of Rs. 1,000 to the Director
- List of winners of the Nandi Award for Third Best Feature Film|Best Third Feature Film: Punaadi Raallu
  - Bronze Nandi to the Producer/ Banner
  - Memento to the Director
- First Best Story Writer
  - Cash prize of Rs.1,000

- Second Best Story Writer
  - Cash prize of Rs. 500 to the Story Writer
- (B)DOCUMENTARY FILMS
- First Best Documentary film
- Golden Nandi with a cash prize of Rs.2,000 to the Producer/Banner
- Cash prize of Rs. 1,000 to the Director

- Second Best Documentary film
- Silver Nandi with a cash prize of Rs.1,000 to the Producer/Banner
- Cash prize of Rs.500 to the Director
- Third Best Documentary Film
- Bronze Nandi to the Producer/ Banner
- Memento to the Director

- (C) CHILDREN’S FILMS
- First Best Children's film
- Golden Nandi with a cash prize of Rs. 10,000 to the Producer/Banner
- Cash prize of Rs. 2,000 to the Director

- Second Best Children's film
- Silver Nandi with a cash prize of Rs. 3,000 to the Producer/Banner
- Cash prize of Rs. 1,000 to the Director

- Third Best Children's Film
- Bronze Nandi to the Producer/Banner
- Memento to the Director
- (E)EDUCATIONAL FILMS
- First Best Educational Film
- Golden Nandi with a cash prize of Rs. 2,000 to the Producer/Banner
- Cash prize of Rs. 1,000 to the Director

- Second Best Feature film
- Silver Nandi to the Producer/ Banner
- Third Best Educational Film
- Bronze Nandi to the Producer/ Banner:
- Individual Awards for Artistes & Tech
- Best Actor : Gokina Ramarao
- (Silver Nandi with a cash prize of Rs.10,000 and Commendation Certificate)
- Title of the Film : Punaadi Raallu
- Best Actress : Ms.Jayasudha
- (Silver Nandi with a cash prize of Rs.10,000 and Commendation Certificate)
- Title of the Film : Idi Katha Kaadu
- Best Child Actor : Baby Tulasi
- (Copper Nandi with a cash prize of Rs.10,000 and Commendation Certificate)
- Title of the Film :Sankaraabharanam
- Best Screenplay Writer : B. Narsing Rao
- (Copper Nandi with a cash prize of Rs.10,000 and Commendation Certificate)
- Title of the Film :Maa Bhoomi
- Best Cinematographer : P. S. Nivas
- (Copper Nandi with a cash prize of Rs.10,000 and Commendation Certificate)
- Title of the Film :Nimajjanam
- Best Lyric Writer : Veturi
- (Copper Nandi with a cash prize of Rs.10,000 and Commendation Certificate)
- Title of the Film : Sankaraabharanam
- Best Music Director : K. V. Mahadevan
- (Copper Nandi with a cash prize of Rs.10,000 and Commendation Certificate)
- Title of the Film : Sankaraabharanam
- BestMalePlaybackSinger:S.P.Balasubramanyam
- (Copper Nandi with a cash prize of Rs.10,000 and Commendation Certificate
- Title of the Film : Sankaraabharanam
- Best Female Playback Singer :Vani Jairam
- (Copper Nandi with a cash prize of Rs.10,000 and Commendation Certificate)
- Title of the Film : Sankaraabharanam
