= Thangam (TV series) =

Indian soap opera

- Genre: Drama
- Written by: S. Ashok Kumar; S. Kumaresan; JP
- Directed by: Rajesh; B. Nakkeeran; Sulaiman K. Babu; G. Manikanda Kumar
- Starring: Ramya Krishnan; Vijayakumar; Seema; Manju Bhargavi; Anuradha; Sridevi Ashok
- Theme music composer: Fatima Vijay Antony (title song); G. V. Kalai Kathir (background score)
- Opening theme: Thangam Theeyil Jolikkum Thunbam Unnai Sethukkum
- Country of origin: India
- Original language: Tamil
- No. of episodes: 906

Production
- Producer: Vaidehi Ramamurthy
- Production location: Tamil Nadu
- Editor: S.Arul
- Running time: (approx. 20-.22 minutes per episode)
- Production companies: Vision Time India Private Limited; Srinivasa Visuals Private Limited

Original release
- Network: Sun TV
- Release: 29 June 2009 – 25 January 2013

Related
- Aparanji; Bangara

Thangam (transl. Gold) is a Tamil soap opera that was broadcast on Sun TV. The show's main cast includes Ramya Krishnan, Vijayakumar, Seema, and Manju Bhargavi. The show premiered on 29 June 2009, This serial was produced by Vision Time India Private Limited and Srinivasa Visuals Private Limited, This serial was directed by B. Nakkeeran.

The plot is centred around a woman and the challenges she faces among her family members and society.

== Plot ==
Raja Ramachandra Raghunath (Vijayakumar), known as Ayyaa, is the head of the Ayyakudi village. Ayyaa has two wives, Naachiyar (Seema) and Subbulakshmi (Manju Bhargavi), with whom he has two sons and three daughters.

Ayyaa's younger sister Mutharasi (Anuradha) is married to Kulasekharan (G.K.), the main antagonist and Naachiyar's elder brother. Mutharasi and Kulasekharan have two children, Jayachandran and Ilavanji (Kaveri).

Ganga is married to Selvakannan (former: Krishna Kumar, present: Sai Kiran), a well-known and respected IAS district collector. Also an IAS graduate, Ganga works with her husband as a sub-collector.

Kulasekharan hates Subbulakshmi because she shares her spouse with Naachiyar (his sister). Ilavanji and her husband, Ayyaa's son Karthik, support him. Since Kulasekharan only wants Ayyaa to be Naachiyar's husband and no one else's, he tries to get rid of Subbulakshmi, Ganga, Ramaa, and Charu, and banish them from the village. He tries to kill Selvakannan, separate Ramaa and Jayachandran, and cheat Subbulakshmi into letting him out of jail. Some of his attempts succeed, while others fail miserably and end up backfiring. Naachiyar does not give in to Kulasekharan's wishes because she loves Subbulakshmi like her own sister.

Selvakannan has an aunt, Rasammah, who lives with him and his parents. Rasammah has a niece named Manimegalai, whom she wanted Selvakannan to marry. Manimegalai also loves Selvakannan very much, but seeing his insistence on marrying Ganga and knowing Ganga to be a perfect person; she sacrifices her love for their happiness. However, Rasammah does not like that Ganga has married Selvakannan, and tries her best to poison Selvakannan's mother to try to compel Selvakannan to break his bond with Ganga. Eventually, she takes a liking to Ganga, and forgets about separating them. Karpagam initially gives in to Rasammah's talk, but she too begins to love and respect Ganga and her family.

Ilavanji is a sensitive woman who does not like Subbulakshmi's family. She is always in support of her father, whom she loves very much. Slowly, she starts to get along with Subbulakshmi's family, but does not forget her hatred towards them. Ilavanji is jealous of Ramaa because Ramaa is married to her brother, and because everyone in the family, with the exception of her husband Karthik and Kulasekharan, loves Subbulakshmi's family. Ilavanji and Vadivu, who are both Ayyaa's daughters-in-law, never get along and always fight. In this matter, Ilavanji is supported by Mangai, who is friends with Ilavanji and Ganga, and is Vishwanathan's mother. On the other hand, Vadivu is a brilliant girl who loves Subbulakshmi's family. She always finds out about Ilavanji's mischief and makes their mother-in-law punish Ilavanji and Mangai.

Ganga becomes pregnant, but her child is aborted because she is hit while trying to protect her husband from a raging bull released by Kulasekharan during Vadivu's wedding with Saravanan. Ramaa also becomes pregnant.

Selvakannan has a P.A. named Vandana, a mysterious and evil girl, who knows that Selvakannan has had a brain tumor for a very long time. Vandana does not inform Selvakannan's family members about the tumor until the condition worsens and Selvakannan is on his deathbed. Every doctor gives up on him and tells the family that Selvakannan will die in nine days, and his death is unpreventable. Ganga believes that her husband can be cured through God's grace. In those nine days, she observes nine different types of penances in the name of Goddess Amman. Her family members also do their part by going to Palani and carrying milk pots. Miraculously, her paralysed husband can move, and he is immediately operated on and cured. Everyone in the family hates Vandana for hiding Selvakannan's sickness from them, as well as for her false allegations against Selvakannan that he had married Vandana before marrying Ganga.

To clear Selvakannan from Vandana's allegations, the family decides to meet up with the villagers at the Ellaiyamman temple on the outskirts of the village. It is believed that when ground chili paste is rubbed on the Goddess residing in the temple, the Goddess will punish the person at fault by setting them on fire. When Selvakannan and Vandana rub chili paste on Goddess Ellaiyamman, to their shock, neither Selvakannan nor Vandana feel their bodies burning. The priest realises that there is some mischief going on, so he invokes the Goddess and tells everyone through the Goddess's words that this matter will be resolved in 60 days. Following this incident, Vandana becomes even more evil and mysterious. Everyone in Ganga's family is annoyed that Vandana is staying at Ganga's house until very late in the night, and she is brutally chased out by Mutharasi, Ilavanji, Charu, and Mangai.

Subbulakshmi's pet cow, Lakshmi, gives birth to a beautiful baby calf, and Naachiyar gives Lakshmi's mother to Subbulakshmi as a wedding gift. The same day, Ganga is tested pregnant. The whole family rejoices and the women in the family crowd into Ellaiyamman temple to make Pongal for the Goddess. Suddenly, winds are blowing and the brick stoves do not catch fire as they are supposed to. The women begin to do the Kummi Adi, a folk dance done in a circle by Tamil village women, to appease the Goddess. During the dance, the idol of the Goddess falls flat on the floor. Horrified, the people at the temple try to put the idol back in place, but they notice that the idol is unusually light and hollow. Selvakannan and Ganga realise that the idol had been changed into a fake one and the real idol is elsewhere. They now understand that this was the reason that the Goddess did not punish Vandana when she rubbed chili paste on the Goddess. Everyone suspects that Vandana was the one who had changed the idol. Eventually, the real idol of the Goddess is found dumped in an available temple tank. After some investigation by the police, through Ilavanji, Kulasekharan is found guilty of changing the idol.

During Ayyaa and his two wives's 60th marriage anniversary ceremony, it is discovered that Ayya married Subbulakshmi because of a dark secret that only Ayya, Naachiyar, and Subbulakshmi know about. Kulasekharan is aware of this, and he tries to find out the secret by filing a case against Subbulakshmi, citing that she is not Ayyaa's legal wife. The case is resolved after Ayyaa explains to the judge in private why he married Subbulakshmi, and he wins the case. Angry and humiliated, Kulasekharan ponders over Ayyaa and Subbulakshmi's secret.

Previously, Kulasekharan's father, Thavasi, had remarried because he lost his first wife. This was under the decision of the Ayyaa (village head) of the time, Ramachandra Raghunath's father, considering that Kulasekharan and Naachiyar were motherless. The stepmother, Bhagyalakshmi, was a kind and loving woman who never harboured any hatred towards Kulasekharan, but Kulasekharan felt that with his stepmother and her newborn baby, Naachiyar and Thavasi were not the same as before. On the other hand, Naachiyar loved her stepmother and stepsister. Feeling like an outcast, Kulasekharan never let Bhagyalakshmi's baby lie in Naachiyar's cradle and refused to let Bhagyalakshmi touch him. At one point, he tried to kill her and her baby using a gas spray. Seeing that things were going out of hand, Ayyaa called for arbitration and stated that Kulasekharan should stay with him until Bhagyalakshmi's child had grown up. However, Bhagyalakshmi refused this judgement, saying that the family did not need to be separate because of her, and she would go far away from them due to the never-ending hatred. She left and was never seen again.

Kulasekharan thinks that Bhagyalakshmi's daughter could be Subbulakshmi since she and Naachiyar are very close, like sisters. This is unusual because if two women were to share the same husband, there would likely be a lot of jealousy and enmity among the wives. Kulasekharan questions Naachiyar about this. Later, he asks Subbulakshmi about who she is. She faints, and Kulasekharan takes her to the hospital. After Subbulakshmi wakes up, Ayyaa tells Kulasekharan the dark secret behind his marriage.

Kulasekharan poisons Subbulakshmi's food, which she eats. Her doctor realises she is poisoned but only tells Selvakannan. He goes to get the cure, which is a rare herb in the forest. Despite some difficulties, Selvakannan gets the cure, and Subbulakshmi is saved.

Ayyaa's brother's children, Santhanapandi, Seenipandi, and Virumandi, return to the village. They had been banished from the village 30 years ago for committing a crime. They try to do things against Ayyaa, such as surrounding the public well with a wall so people cannot get water to drink. They also have plans to destroy Ayya's family to take his place.

After receiving medicine from her son-in-law Selvakannan, Subbulakshmi is cured. Her youngest daughter Charu gets a proposal, but there is a conflict between the groom's side and the bride's side. The groom's side is accepting of the proposal, but they are not satisfied because Kulasekharan threatens to have the marriage not take place, causing the family to be depressed and upset. Charu refuses to talk to Aravindan due to the problems they are facing. Aravindan is in love with Charu and plans to get her at any cost, so he joins with Kulasekharan for help. Kulasekharan gives him the idea to rape Charu. One night, when no one is at home except Charu, Aravindan rapes her, and she faints. Subbulakshmi sees this, grabs a knife, and stabs Aravindan. However, both Subbulakshmi and Aravindan manage to escape. The next day, the people in the village find Aravindan's dead body lying in the middle of a path and inform the police and Ayyaa. The groom's side thinks that Ayyaa's side killed their son. They keep searching for Subbulakshmi, but she is nowhere to be found, and they plan to publish this in the newspaper.

Ganga is pregnant with twins, and she learns about how her mother went missing. She eventually finds out where her mother is and gets injured by a gang. The person who is threatening Ganga is Vandana, who is trying to destroy Ganga. Ganga is taken to the hospital by Selvakannan, as he was searching for her and had found her on the ground with life-threatening injuries. The doctors request Selvakannan for the operation to save Ganga and their children, and everyone survives. However, Vandana hires a nurse to kill the twin babies without anyone noticing. The doctor tells the bad news to Selvakannan, but not Ganga.

Selvakannan is upset and wants to save his wife from depression, but he does not know what to do. He runs into his old classmate Kokila and tells her what happened. She feels sorry for him and gives him her youngest child, who had been born recently. They promise to not leak the secret as Kokila is very poor due to her husband's drinking habits. Selvakannan decides to pay for Kokila's children's education to help. Selvakannan takes the baby to the hospital and puts it where the twins were. Ganga regains consciousness and is happy to see the baby, but is sad that her other baby died. She thinks that the baby is hers, as Selvakannan wants her to think. Vandana is suspicious of this and tries to find out. Ganga comes home with the baby, and Charu gets pregnant with Aravindan's baby. None of Ganga's family members tells her about Charu and what happened to her.

A minister in the next village finds Subbulakshmi's picture published in the newspaper and calls the number given. He says that he found Subbulakshmi in his village. Unfortunately, it is Kulasekharan who answers the call. He lies to Ayyaa that someone called, and runs to the village to meet the minister. He brainwashes the minister into thinking that his people want to kill Subbulakshmi, and hides from Ayyaa and the family. Ganga meets the minister and asks him to tell her if he knows Subbulakshmi's whereabouts. At Kulasekharan's request, the minister does not tell the truth to Ganga.

Subbulakshmi is held in the police station for murdering Aravindan in her village, and she doesn't tell them who she is and where she is from. The police take her to jail. Kulasekharan knows her whereabouts and hires a jailer to kill Subbulakshmi. The plan succeeds, but Ayyaa finds out Subbulakshmi's location from a policeman and runs to the jail. Subbulakshmi faints from bleeding from her hand, which the jailer had cut with a sharp blade. Subbulakshmi is taken to the hospital, followed by Ayyaa. Ayyaa tells the family, and they come to the hospital. His son Karthik hates Subbulakshmi, as he was asked by Kulasekharan to kill her. Naachiyar is cautious, knowing that Karthik will kill Subbulakshmi in some way. Since Subbulakshmi has not regained consciousness, Karthik tries to kill Subbulakshmi by removing her oxygen cap, but she is rescued by Naachiyar. Naachiyar slaps her son and reveals their dark secret.

The dark secret is that Naachiyar is not the biological mother of Karthik. His biological mother is Subulakshmi. Naachiyar adopted him as her own in order to protect him and his mother from her brother Kulashekaran's wrath as he would have been more enraged against them if he knew Subulaksmi gave birth to Ayyaa's firstborn son. Karthik does not believe the secret and is convinced that Naachiyar is lying. Naachiyar takes Karthik to the delivery doctor and he learns the truth that Subulakshmi gave birth to him and handed him over to Naachiyar. Karthik is very upset and goes over to Kulasekharan. Kulasekharan refuses to accept that Karthik is his son-in-law and separates Karthik and Ilavanji. Kulasekharan takes Ilavanji to his house and leaves her there. Ilavanji and Karthik had missed each other, and they are sad that they cannot live together anymore.

Karthik angrily kidnaps Ramma on the day of the baby shower. Ramma is in pain to deliver her baby. Karthik feels bad and calls Ilavanji to bring a delivery lady to the place. The delivery lady comes, and Ramma gives birth to a baby boy. Karthik feels both happy and guilty about kidnapping Ramma. Ramma forgives him, and he accepts her as his sister. Ilavanji goes to Ayyaa's place and tells the news. Everyone is angry with Karthik's behaviour, refusing to look at his face. Ilavanji begs Ayyaa to forgive Karthik, and Karthik thinks he can join the family if he does good for them. However, he cannot bear up about his real mother and does not know what to do.

One of Vandana's mental brothers escapes from a gang and falls into the well while Karthik is thinking about his mother and his wife. He sees this and chases him. Karthik rescues the mental brother, and he learns from him that Subbulakshmi did not kill Aravindan; someone else killed him and escaped. Then the mental brother took Karthik to where he heard the news. Karthik calls Ilavanji to give the phone to Ayyaa so he can listen to what is happening. Karthik confronts the gang, and they tell him the truth about what happened to Aravindan that day.

Karthik is shocked to hear that Aravindan was dating a gang member's sister, Bhuvana, whom he cheated on. Bhuvana committed suicide by drinking poison. This angered her brother Lakshmipathy, who wanted to take revenge on Aravindan. That day, Subbulakshmi pierced Aravindan, and he escaped and ran to the gang for help. Lakshmipathy kills Aravindan by throwing a huge rock over his head. After hearing the truth, Ayyaa tells the police. Karthik is knocked down by a member of the gang. They carry him to the van and are ready to escape, but the police and Ayyaa find them and rescue Karthik. A member of the gang pulls a gun from the policeman's pocket and shoots Karthik. He is arrested and put in jail. Karthik, who is in a serious condition, is taken to the hospital. Ayyaa gets Subbulakshmi released from jail and they go to the hospital. The doctors find it hard to save Karthik as his health is at a risky stage. Karthik is happy to accept Subbulakshmi as his mother. Everyone is very sad and cries as Karthik knows he is going to die.

After seeing his mother, Karthik miraculously survives. He asks Subbulakshmi to meet Aravindan's family so they can learn the truth and convince them to accept Charu. Subbulakshmi goes there, confronts them, and tells them the truth about Aravindan. Aravindan's mother knows that her son is bad, and she tells her husband the truth about Aravindan. He feels shame and visits Ayyaa's house to seek forgiveness. Aravindan's family asks for Charu, since Charu refuses to go there. Karthik pleads with Charu to see Aravindan, as he wants to ask for forgiveness for the miserable mistakes he made in her life. Charu feels bad and does not see his face, and cries in the house. Charu is accepted to be daughter-in-law for Aravindan's family.

Selvakannan faces a trouble with Kokila's husband Rathnan. Kokila refuses to let her husband know about the baby. However, drunkard Rathnan finds out and blackmails Selvakannan for ransom to keep the secret. Ganga finds what is happening between Selvakannan and Kokila suspicious, as she appoints her as a servant. Rathnan comes into the house to reveal the truth, but Ganga knows who he and Kokila are. She calls everyone to the hall and begins to tell the truth about Rathnan, Kokila and the baby. She insists that Kokila take the baby back. Selvakannan feels guilty for not telling Ganga the truth and asks her for forgiveness. She accepts him as she says Selvakannan wants her to be happy after all. Kokila and Rathnan walk out of the house with the baby. In the end, Ganga and Selvakannan get along well, and they are happy.

Kulasekeran comes with his wife Mutharasi to Ayyaa's house to take Ilavanji, as he does not want her to be with Karthik. Mutharasi refuses to take her daughter. She argues with him and makes him remove her marriage chain. Karthik and Ilvanji become a couple again. Kulasekharan challenges to destroy Ayyaa and his family with upcoming master plans.

Ayyaa catches Vandana and her mother mixing poison into the food. Subbulakshmi and Kulasekharan stop everyone from eating the food. Kulasekharan turns over a new leaf, and everyone takes family photos and is happy.

== Cast ==
=== Main ===
- Ramya Krishnan as Gangadevi Selvakannan; Subbulakshmi and Ayyaa's eldest daughter and wife of Selvakannan
- Vijayakumar as Rajaramachandra Raghunath, also known as Ayyaa. He is Karthik, Saravanan, Ganga, Ramaa and Charu's father and the husband of Naachiyar and Subbulakshmi.
- Seema as Sundharavalli Naachiyar; Kulasekharan's sister, Subbulakshmi's half-sister and Ayyaa's first wife, Karthik's adopted mother, Saravanan's mother.
- Manju Bhargavi as Subbulakshmi. She is Kulasekharan and Naachiyar's half-sister, Ayya's second wife, and the mother of Karthik, Ganga, Ramaa and Charu.
- Krishna Kumar and Sai Kiran as Selvakannan; Ganga's husband and collector of Thanjavur

=== Supporting ===
- GK as Kulasekharan and Thavasi. Kulasekharan is Naachiyar's brother, Subbulakshmi's half-brother, Mutharasi's husband, and the father of Jeyachandran and Ilavanji. He hates Subbulakshmi and wouldn't hesitate to do anything to destroy Subbulakshmi and her daughters
- Anuradha as Muttharasi Kulasekharan; Kulasekharan's wife, Ayyaa's sister and the mother of Jeyachandran and Ilavanji
- Pollachi Babu as Karthik; Ayyaa and Subbulakshmi's son and Ilavanji's husband
- Kaveri as Ilavanji; Kulasekharan's daughter and Karthik's wife
- Joyson and Kurinji Nathan as Saravanan; Ayyaa and Naachiyar's son and Vadivu's husband
- Varsha Mohammed as Shanmugavadivu, also known as Vadivu, who is Saravanan's wife
- Lakshmiraj as Jayachandran; Kulasekharan's son and Ramaa's husband
- Sandra Amy and Sridevi Ashok as Ramaadevi, also known as Ramaa, who is Subbulakshmi's second daughter
- Jyothi as Charulatha, also known as Charu, who is Subbulakshmi's youngest daughter
- Vijay as Aravindan, Charu's ex-fiancée, future baby father
- Vandhana Michael as Vandana Chellapandi. She is Avudaiammal and Chellapandi's daughter.
- Vijay Krishnaraj as Shanmugam
- T. S. B. K. Moulee as Satyamoorthy
- T.Durai Raj as Vijayan
- Swarnamalya as Naagarani
- Vellai Subbaiah as Pillaivazh, Ayyaa's assistant
- Shanthi Williams as Avudaiammal, who is Vandana, Santhanapandiyan, Sakkaraipandiyan and Virumandi's mother, and Ayya's elder sister-in-law
- Sulakshana as Dhanam, Santhanapandian's wife
- Sukran as Cheenisami Pandi
- Santhana Bharathi as Santhanapandi, who is Avudaiammal and Chellapandi's son, and the brother of Cheenipandi, Virumandi and Vandana
- Isaac Varkees as Shenbagapandian, Vadivu's brother
- Gayathri Shastry as Kokila; Selvakannan's classmate who gave her baby child to Selvakannan, whose babies died because of Vandana
- Bhavya Kala as Manimeghalai, Selvakannan's cousin
- Abhishek Shankar as Rathnan, Kokila's husband
- Sumathi Shree as Mangaiyarkarasi, also known as Mangai, Ilavanji's gangmate
- Manush as Vishwanathan, also known as Vishwa, Mangai's son and Ganga's friend
- Apser Babu as Rathnavel, Selvakannan's father
- Jaya Rekha as Karpagam, Selvakannan's mother
- Divya Krishnan as Bhuvana, Lakshmipathy's sister who died because Aravindan cheated on her
- Mahesh Prabha as Lakshmipathy, who killed Aravindan
- Vijayalaksmi as Raasammah, Karpagam's sister
- Vijayachandrika as the grandmother of Vadivu and Shenbagapandi
- Senthilnathan as the father-in-law of Vetrimaran
- Rajkumar Manoharan as Vetrimaran
- Raveena Daha as small girl (Cameo)

=== Special appearance ===
- Kalpana Ranjini as Kuchalambal

== Promotion ==
In March 2010, the production team collaborated with Godrej's Cinthol soap to promote the series with a competition. The winner was a college student G Vidya from Coimbatore, who was offered a role in the series.

== Remakes ==
The series was remade in Kannada as Bangara, starring Tamil film actress Rathi as the female lead, and was broadcast on Udaya TV. The series was also remade in Telugu as Aparanji, broadcast on Gemini TV, starring Suhasini.

== Reception ==
A woman named Kashawwa Rudrappa Badelapannavar of Basapur village in Bailhongal taluk, a keen viewer of the remade series Bangara, died of a cardiac arrest when lead character Kaveri, her favourite character, got into trouble.

In December 2009, film distributor K S Geetha filed a case against Thangam for stopping its telecast and dubbing claiming them of copyright infringement in the storyline which she had the rights bought from Kutty Padmini.

== Awards and nominations ==
Year	Award	Category	Recipient	Role	Result
2010	Sun Kudumbam Awards 2010	Best Actor	KK	Selvakannan	Nominated
2010	Sun Kudumbam Awards 2010	Best Actress	Ramya Krishnan	Ganga	Nominated
2010	Sun Kudumbam Awards 2010	Special Jury Award	Ramya Krishnan	Ganga	Won
2010	Sun Kudumbam Awards 2010	Best Father	Vijayakumar	Ayyaa	Won
2010	Sun Kudumbam Awards 2010	Best Mother	Manju Bhargavi	Subbulakshmi	Nominated
2010	Sun Kudumbam Awards 2010	Best Sister	Anuradha	Mutharasi	Nominated
2010	Sun Kudumbam Awards 2010	Best Mamiyar	Seema	Naachiyar	Nominated
2010	Sun Kudumbam Awards 2010	Best Male Villain	GK	Kulasekharan	Nominated
2010	Sun Kudumbam Awards 2010	Best Female Villain	Kaveri	Ilavanji	Won
2012	Sun Kudumbam Awards 2012	Best Comedian Male	Pollachi Babu	Karthik	Nominated
2012	Sun Kudumbam Awards 2012	Dubbing Artis Male	Vasu		Nominated
2012	Sun Kudumbam Awards 2012	Best Supporting Actor	Pollachi Babu	Karthik	Won
2012	Sun Kudumbam Awards 2012	Best Brother	Pollachi Babu	Karthik	Nominated
2012	Sun Kudumbam Awards 2012	Best Sister	Anuradha	Mutharasi	Won
2012	Sun Kudumbam Awards 2012	Best Father	Vijayakumar	Ayyaa	Nominated
2012	Sun Kudumbam Awards 2012	Best Mother	Seema	Naachiyar	Nominated
2012	Sun Kudumbam Awards 2012	Best Mamiyar	Jayarekha	Karpagam	Nominated
2012	Sun Kudumbam Awards 2012	Best Mamanar		Rathanavelu	Nominated
2012	Sun Kudumbam Awards 2012	Best Director	B. Nakkeeran		Nominated
2017	Tamil Nadu State Television Awards	Best Character Artistes Female	Seema	Naachiyar	Won
2017	Tamil Nadu State Television Awards	Best Screenwriter	S. Ashok Kumar		Won
2017	Tamil Nadu State Television Awards	Dubbing Artistes Male	Balu Kathiravan		Won

== See also ==
- List of programs broadcast by Sun TV
