= Chinnari Muddula Papa =

- Movie Poster
- Directed by: Vaasi Reddy
- Written by: Yadavalli (dialogues)
- Screenplay by: Vadde Ramesh & Vaasi Reddy
- Story by: Vadde Ramesh & Vaasi Reddy
- Based on: Three Men and a Cradle (1985)
- Produced by: Vadde Ramesh
- Starring: Jagapathi Babu; Kaveri
- Cinematography: A. Mohan
- Edited by: G. G. Krishna Rao
- Music by: S. P. Kodandapani Eeswar
- Production company: Nallini Cini Creations
- Release date: 22 November 1990
- Running time: 124 minutes
- Country: India
- Language: Telugu

Chinnari Muddula Papa (transl. Cute Lovely Baby) is a 1990 Indian Telugu-language drama film produced by Vadde Ramesh under the Nalini Cini Creations banner and directed by Vaasi Reddy. It stars Jagapathi Babu, Sudhakar, Sivaji Raja, Kaveri and music composed by S. P. Kodandapani Eeswar. The film is based on the Malayalam film Thoovalsparsham, which was inspired by the 1987 American film Three Men and a Baby, which itself was based on the 1985 French movie Three Men and a Cradle and later on remade in Tamil twice - as Thayamma and as Asathal and in Hindi as Heyy Babyy (2007).

== Plot ==
The film begins with three happy bachelors, Anand, Sudhakar, & Siva, who share an apartment with frequent parties and flings. One day, a baby named Maya arrives on their doorstep with a note revealing she is the result of the perfidy of one of them. Then, Anand thinks back to his first love, Sunita, and how they spent the night together. Later, Sunita misconstrues, loathes, and splits from Anand, catching sight of his closeness with another girl. So, Anand declares Maya as his child. Accordingly, it forlorn the men to take care of the baby and attempts to dispose of her but fail as they are strongly correlated. Parallelly, as a glimpse, Sudhakar & Siva love their neighbors Shanti, a modern girl & Jyoti, a widow, respectively. Aside from this, a dreadful gangster, Johnson, smuggles precious diamonds on time, which strike at Maya's cradle, and they back her.

Once, Maya is ailing due to a heart problem and must undergo surgery soon. Hence, Anand donates his kidney and rescues her to raise the amount. Meanwhile, Sunita arrives and apologizes to Anand, through whom he is aware that Maya is not their daughter. Despite that, he accepts Maya as his own. After a few disarrays, Maya's real parents Prasad & Lakshmi land. Indeed, the pair previously resided in the same flat as the three men and detached because of ego. Further, Lakshmi left Maya in front of the flat, misinterpreting that her husband was still hanging on therein. Simultaneously, Maya is abducted by Johnson when the three safeguard her by ceasing him. Now, the three besties must forcibly hand over the baby to her parents with grief. The next day, Prasad shifts to a plot in the apartment as the three friends emotionally connect with his daughter.

== Cast ==
- Jagapati Babu as Anand
- Sudhakar as Sudhakar
- Kaveri as Sunita
- Sivaji Raja as Shivaji
- Kota Srinivasa Rao as Patel
- Pradeep Shakthi as Anand's father
- Raja as Maya's father
- R. V. Prasad as Johnson
- Bhimeswara Rao as a doctor
- Kallu Chidambaram as photographer
- Rajitha as Jyoti
- Disco Shanti as Shanti
- Sandhya as Jyoti's mother
- Lakshmi Priya as Anand's mother
- Baby Sowjanya as Maya

== Soundtrack ==
Chinnari Muddula Papa

Film score by S. P. Kodandapani Eeswar
- Released: 1990
- Genre: Soundtrack
- Length: 12:56
- Label: Cauvery Audio
- Producer: S. P. Kodandapani Eeswar

Music composed by S. P. Kodandapani Eeswar. Music released on Cauvery Audio Company.

S. No.	Song title	Singers	lyrics	length
1	"Veeche Gaali"	S. P. Balasubrahmanyam	Sirivennela Sitarama Sastry	4:14
2	"Mattugundi Gammattugundi"	S. P. Balasubrahmanyam, Chitra	Veturi	4:22
3	"Idi Ramba Taalam"	S. P. Balasubrahmanyam, Chitra	Jonnavithhula Ramalingeswara Rao	4:20
