= Vamsam (TV series) =

Indian Tamil soap opera

- Genre: Soap opera
- Written by: Aishwaryan
- Directed by: C.J.Bhaskar (1-117); K.Rajeev Prasad (118-245); Arulrai (246-925); V.Sadhasivam (926-1088); A.P.Rajendran (1089-1135); A.B.Nakeeran (1136-1195); Sulaiman K Babu (1196-1265); Suki Moorthy (1266-1338)
- Creative director: Ramya Krishnan
- Starring: Ramya Krishnan; Urvashi; Sandhya Jagarlamudi; Sakthi Saravanan; Sai Kiran; Bharath Kalyan; Seema
- Opening theme: "Oruvallum Karivilluthan" Gana Bala (Vocals and lyrics)
- Country of origin: Republic of India
- Original language: Tamil
- No. of seasons: 1
- No. of episodes: 1338

Production
- Producer: Vaidehi Ramamurthy
- Cinematography: Tamilmaran
- Editors: Manikandan Ravi, S.Arul
- Camera setup: Multi-camera
- Running time: 20–24 minutes
- Production company: Vision Time

Original release
- Network: Sun TV
- Release: 10 June 2013 – 18 November 2017

Vamsam is an Indian Tamil-language family television series starring Ramya Krishnan (dual roles) and Sandhya Jagarlamudi in lead roles, whilst Urvashi, Sakthi Saravanan, Sai Kiran, and Bharath Kalyan star in supporting roles. It replaced Rajakumari and it was broadcast on Sun TV on Monday through Saturday from 10 June 2013 to 18 November 2017 for 1,338 episodes. It was replaced by Azhagu. It was dubbed in Telugu as Kutumbam on Gemini TV.The show was retelecasted at the same channel from July 28, 2026 at 8:00 PM on Kalaignar TV.

== Plot summary ==
The original story starts with Shakthi (Ramya Krishnan) wanting to find her relatives and unite her mother with her uncle Vetrivel Annachi (Vijayakumar) and her father with her aunt Nagavalli (Vadivukkarasi). Still, in a tragic accident set up by Nagavalli, Shakthi's parents die, and she is the only survivor. She returns to the serial after many episodes. She marries Ponnurangam (Sai Kiran). Still, after a while, it is revealed that since the accident, Shakthi's twin sister, Archana IAS (Ramya Krishnan), separated from her a long time ago, has been acting as Shakthi. She did this because, after the accident in which her parents died, Shakthi was very ill, so when she met her twin sister, Archana IAS, at the hospital for the first time, she asks her to act as Shakthi and defeat Nagavalli and protect her family. Archana wanted to reveal her true identity later. Still, when the police arrest her husband Ponnurangam for Archana's murder, she is forced to disclose that she is not Shakthi but Archana IAS.

After this moment, Ponnurangam and many of the others in Shakthi's family start ignoring Archana and treating her as an outcast. She is forced even to do house chores. One day, Archana also refuses the Chennai collector post because Ponnurangam told her to do so. Meanwhile, Doctor Madhan (Sakthi Saravanan), who originally intended to marry Shakthi (actually Archana), but married Bhoomika (Sandhiya), dislikes Bhoomika and tries in many ways first to marry Supriya (Reshma Pasupuleti) and then later Actress/ Gwaliyar Ilavarasi Myna (Sandhiya). He succeeds in marrying Myna even though Bhoomika has a child. Archana is also pregnant with twins, but Ponnurangam donates one of his daughters in the hospital to Solaiyamma (K.S. Jayalakshmi) and Krishna, husband of Rukmini. He has lost her child six times. He does this to save Rukmini's life. Solaiyamma later refuses to give him the child because she wants the 500 crores property of Rukmini. Ponnurangam is torn between getting his child back and telling Archana about all this. It is revealed that Bhoomika has been acting as Myna to win Madhan's affection and later Vasantha finds out and Bhoomika and Vasantha have the challenge to see who will make Madhan believe them. Currently, Shakthi lives in Singapore and helps Archana. Rukmini now knows the truth about her cunning mother-in-law and husband and is staying in Archana's house while making Solaiyamma and Krishna believe that she is in Singapore. Roja and Ramamani are trying to find this out. The court has ruled that Subashree is Archana's daughter and Solaiyamma didn't let Rukmini come into her house. Currently, Madhan and Vasantha are trying many ways to get rid of Bhoomika and Solaiyamma is trying to get the 500 crores property of Rukmini. Archana is also trying to protect her family from Kanchana. Now, Bhoomika has found her father because she looks exactly like her mother, Devika, who died 25 years ago. Ponnurangam has now become assistant commissioner due to Archana's work. Now, Madhan has turned right and wants Bhoomika to find a better life. Now Radha reenters the story, and she is pregnant caused by Nandhakumar, who is engaged to Jothika. After a very disastrous marriage, Nandhakumar reluctantly marries Radha and Sarvesh marries Jothika. However Nandhakumar kidnaps Jothika, then Bhoomika, and even Sarvesh in his goal of marrying Jothika. He also creates a dupe of Jothika and erases Jothika and Sarvesh's memories. He fixes a girl from Andhra for Sarvesh, Radhika, whose brother Sudhan, shockingly looks precisely like Dr Madhan. Nandhakumar is unable to marry Jothika as his many attempts are thwarted by Bhoomika, Radha, Archana, and Shakthi. One day, Velayudham reveals that Nandhakumar is not his son but was given to him 25 years ago by Thamba, an evil sorcerer. He has now come back for his son so he can destroy the Ammayi family, but Bhoomika and Velayudham refuse as Nandhakumar should go to jail so Madhan can be released. When Bhoomika tells this to Archana, Thangamma is shocked and later reveals that Archana and Shakthi are the great-granddaughters of Ammayi and Thamba intends to destroy them. Later, Archana shoots Nandhakumar, and he dies. Shakthi also marries DCP Keerthi's brother Sarath Narayanan. Keerthi intends to kill Sarath for what his father Nambikkai Narayanan did to her father, Shankar Narayanan. Keerthi's mother comes back, and Keerthi goes to jail. Sarath's friend Sudhakar turns evil and starts to use a girl named Jeeva to blackmail Sarath. Jeeva is introduced, and the plot thickens Jeeva is the A.O. of P.S. hospital, and the son-in-law of the chairman Suryamoorthy hates Jeeva for getting all the credit. He has a daughter Priya who loves the chairman's grandson Siddharth, but Siddharth loves Jeeva's daughter Iniya. Archana goes to jail for shooting Sarath and Shakthi stands against her.

In a mysterious murder, Radha dies, and Bhoomika vows to find and kill whoever murdered her. Deepa's brother Sudhakar plans to kill Archana, Shakthi, Jeeva, Sarath, and Bhoomika. Vanitha tries to marry her daughter Priya to Siddharth without his consent, but Siddharth secretly marries Jeeva's daughter Iniya with the help of Raj Narayanan. However, Suryamoorthy's wife, Vanitha, is angry. Later she realises her mistake through her father Perumalswamy and accepts Iiniya as her daughter. Then Sundari (Urvashi) comes to Bhoomika's house and sees Radha as a ghost who talks to her and gets scared. It is revealed that Suryamoorthy killed the ten people at the hospital and later Radha and now Urvashi and Deepa (who has now changed) plan to stop him, Shilpa, and Sudhakar. Surya then dies, and Deepa, Shakthi, and Archana plan to save Sarath from Sudhakar. Sudhakar attaches a bomb to himself and tries to destroy Archana and Shakthi's entire family, but Shakthi shoots and kills Sudhakar and keeps everyone. The whole family takes a group photo and serial ends.

== Cast ==
=== Main cast ===
- Ramya Krishnan in a dual role as:
- Archana Ponnurangam
- Shakthi Sarath Narayanan
- Sandhya Jagarlamudi in a dual role as:
  - Bhoomika Madhan
  - Devika
- Urvashi as Sundari
- Sai Kiran in a dual role as:
  - ACP Ponnurangam Pandiyan
  - Singapore Sivaraj Pandiyan
- Bharath Kalyan as Sarath Narayanan
- Sakthi Saravanan in a dual role as:
  - Madhan Kumaraswamy
  - Sudhan (dual roles)

=== Additional cast ===
- Seema in a dual role as:
  - Thangamma Vetrivel
  - Ponnuthaayi
- Oorvambu Lakshmi as Ramamani
- Saakshi Siva as Balu
- Raani as Keerthi Narayanan
- Reshma Pasupuleti / Sreevani as Supriya
- Ajai Kapoor as Akilesh
- Vinod/Ayyapan as Somnath
- Srinish Aravind as Raj
- Manikanda Rajesh as Siddharth (Siddhu)
- Gemini as Sudharsan
- Jayashree Rao as Roja
- Krish as Sarvesh
- Vinod KG as Anand
- Priya as Vasantha Kumaraswamy
- Priya Anandhi as Shreya Anand
- Ashita Chandrappa as Iniya Siddharth
- Priyanka as Jothika Sarvesh
- Swetha as Mala Balu
- Sasindhar Pushpalingam in a dual role as:
  - Nandakumar(death)(Killed by archana)
  - Thamba(death)(Killed by Radha)
- Krithika Annamalai as Radha Nandakumar
- VJ Mounika as Reshma
- Muthukuppuswamy Rajasekaran as Kumaraswamy
- Dev Sharma Anand as Sudhakar
- Ravikanth as Sivaram
- Kavyavarshini as Deepa
- Pragathi as Jeeva
- Anbalaya Prabhakaran as Perumalswamy
- Raksha Holla as Priya
- S.Kavitha as Vanitha
- Sindhu Krishnan as Arukkani
- Ashwanth Thilak as Muthu
- M. Amulya as Shweta
- Anjali Devi / Varalakshmi as Kanchana
- Vijayalakshmi as Rukmani Krishna
- K. S. Jayalakshmi as Solaiyamma
- Adiksha as Shankari
- Divya Krishnan as Valli
- Vijayakumar as Vetrivel Annachi, Sakthi's and Archana's uncle
- Vadivukkarasi as Nagavalli
- Tharun Master as Paramaguru, Nagavalli's husband
- Rajashree as Thenmozhi, Kathirvel's wife
- Lakshmi Raj as Muthuvel, Annachi's son
- Satheesh Kumar Kas Kathirvel, Annachi 's son
- Ashwanth Karthi as Jayavel, Annachi's son
- Syamantha Kiran as Uttara, Annachi's daughter
- Mohammed Absar as Duraipandi, Nagavalli's son
- Vandana Micheal as Suganthi, Muthuvel's wife
- Gokul as Rajadurai, Nagavalli's son
- Kaveri/Shreekala as Chinnaponnu, Rajadurai's wife
- Shyam Ganesh as Sanjay
- Pollachi Babu as Pichamuthu, Ramamani's husband
- SriLekha as Arukkani's mother
- Amarasigamani as Uthara's father-in-law
- S.Santhanam as Sanjay's father
- J.Lalitha as Sanjay's mother
- Shanmugasundaram as Rangasamy, Annachi's close friend
- A.C. Murali Mohan as Senthil Raja, Nagavalli's brother, Shakthi's and Archana's father
- Sathyapriya as Vasantha, Annachi's sister, Shakthi's and Archana's mother
- Uma Riyaz Khan as Doctor

== Reception ==
According to BARC ratings (Tamil Nadu + Puducherry)' Mega Serial household television ratings, the pilot episode week of That's Vamsam earned an averaging 16.2 million impressions. While the final episode week scored a 13.5 million impressions. It was one of the most watched Tamil television program at its run time. In week 42 of 2017 and the following week, it was at fourth and fifth position.

== Awards and nominations ==
Year	Award	Category	Recipient	Role	Result
2014	Sun Kudumbam Viruthugal	Best Overall Performance	Ramya Krishnan	Shakthi	Won
2014	Sun Kudumbam Viruthugal	Best Sister	Seema	Thangamma	Won
2014	Sun Kudumbam Viruthugal	Best Serial	Vamsam		Nominated
2014	Sun Kudumbam Viruthugal	Best Overall Performance Award	Ramya Krishnan	Shakthi	Nominated
2014	Sun Kudumbam Viruthugal	Best Supporting Actress	Sandhya	Bhoomika	Nominated
2014	Sun Kudumbam Viruthugal	Best Mother	Seema	Thangamma	Nominated
2014	Sun Kudumbam Viruthugal	Best Comedian Male	Sai Kiran	Ponnurangam	Nominated
2014	Sun Kudumbam Viruthugal	Best Comedian Female	Lakshmi	Ramamani	Nominated
2018	1st Galatta Nakshathra Awards	Best Supporting Actress	Sandhya	Bhoomika	Nominated
