= Nallathe Nadakkum =

- Directed by: K. Shankar
- Screenplay by: K. Shankar
- Story by: Thanga Balan
- Produced by: M. G. Vikas; M. G. Vinoth
- Starring: Saravanan; Kaveri; Rohini
- Cinematography: M. C. Sekar
- Edited by: K. Shankar; V. Jayapal
- Music by: Deva
- Production company: Paramount Productions
- Release date: 30 July 1993
- Running time: 125 minutes
- Country: India
- Language: Tamil

Nallathe Nadakkum (transl. Only good things will happen) is a 1993 Indian Tamil-language mystery drama film directed by K. Shankar. The film stars Saravanan, Kaveri and Rohini, with Napoleon, M. N. Nambiar, Janagaraj, Senthil, Silk Smitha and Manorama playing supporting roles. It was released on 30 July 1993.

== Plot ==
Prakash is a public prosecutor who lives with his widow mother. In the past, his father was sentenced to the death penalty for the crime he didn't commit. So Prakash became a lawyer to save innocent people.

Sengodan is accused of killing the village chief Meganathan in the village (Mangalapuram) festival. During the first day of his trial, Sengodan claims innocence and refuses to have a lawyer. Prakash strongly believes that Sengodan is a killer. Later, Sengodan's sister Jeeva, who is also Prakash's lover, personally meets Prakash to prove that her brother is wrongfully accused. During the second day of his trial, Prakash tries everything to save Sengodan from the capital punishment but he fails and Sengodan is sentenced to the death penalty.

Afterwards, Prakash's mother who had a heart disease dies of heart attack. During the funeral rites, a wounded man states that Sengodan is innocent and passes away in the arms of Prakash. Prakash is now determined to save the innocent Sengodan from the hanging. He takes one-month leave and goes to Mangalapuram in order to investigate this odd affair. He learns that his lover Jeeva killed herself after the verdict, and her ghost is singing the night in the village. Prakash then takes refuge at Valliammal's house. Valliammal's daughter Jaya slowly falls in love with Prakash.

Prakash starts to suspect Meganathan's brother Vikraman and Meganathan's widow Ramadevi to be the murderers. What transpires next forms the rest of the story.

== Cast ==
- Saravanan as Prakash
- Kaveri as Jeeva
- Rohini as Jaya
- Napoleon as Vikraman
- M. N. Nambiar
- Janagaraj as Rami
- Senthil as Boologam
- Silk Smitha as Ramadevi
- Manorama as Valliammal
- Pasi Sathya as Vaigundam
- Anuja as Thaiyalnayaki
- Bhanumathi as Prakash's mother
- Sumathisri as Mangalam
- Saathappan Nandakumar as Meganathan
- Kumarimuthu as Siruppu Singaram
- Thideer Kannaiah
- LIC Narasimhan
- Thillai Rajan
- T. K. S. Natarajan
- Shanmugasundari as Anjala
- Samikkannu

== Soundtrack ==
The soundtrack was composed by Deva, with lyrics written by Vaali.

Song	Singer(s)	Duration
"En Swami Iyyappan"	S. P. Balasubrahmanyam	4:50
"Marangotthi"	S. Janaki	4:42
"Nalla Rathiri"	K. S. Chithra, S. P. Balasubrahmanyam	5:07
"Onnu Rendu"	S. Janaki	5:06
"Vaa Thalaivaa"	S. Janaki	5:03

== Reception ==
Malini Mannath of The Indian Express gave the film a negative review, criticising the "insipid" screenplay and "lacklustre" treatment. She also felt the comedy subplot involving Janagaraj, Senthil and Sathya "evokes no laughs".
