= Kaveri (Tamil actress) =

South Indian former actress

- Born: Angela Maria Candice D'Costa
- Occupation(s): Actress, Model
- Years active: 1990–2013
- Spouse: Rakesh (m. 2013)

Kaveri D'Costa (born Angela) is an Indian actress who primarily worked in Tamil serial and films, along with a few Telugu serials and films.

== Life ==
Kaveri's birth name is Angela Maria Candice D'Costa. She's an Anglo-Indian by birth. In 2013, Kaveri married Rakesh at Rishivandiyam Arthanareeswarar Temple, Viluppuram district.

Kaveri made her debut as a heroine in the Tamil movie Vaigasi Poranthachu in 1990 and later began to focus on series. She is best known for her role as Dhanam as the elder daughter of Chidambaram in the TV series Metti Oli and Thangam for her role as Illavanji.

== Filmography ==
=== Films ===
Year	Film	Role	Language
1990	Vaigasi Poranthachu	Ranjitha	Tamil
1990	Unnai Naan Vazhthugiren		Tamil
1990	Panthaya Kuthiraigal		Tamil
1990	Chinnari Muddula Papa	Sunita	Telugu
1992	Pokkiri Thambi	Kaveri	Tamil
1992	Sahasam	Usha	Telugu
1993	Shenbagam	Shenbagam	Tamil
1993	Nallathe Nadakkum	Jeeva	Tamil
1994	Sethupathi IPS	Saraswathy	Tamil
1995	Padikkara Vayasula	Chellathayi	Tamil

=== TV series ===
- 1995 Sneha (ETV) as Sneha - Telugu
- 1996 Antha Oru Nimisham (Dordarshan TV) - Tamil
- 1996-1997 Antharangalu (ETV) - Telugu
- 1999-2000 Panchavarnakili (Sun TV) as Durga - Tamil
- 2000 Micro Thodar- Thuru Pudikkum Manasu (Raj TV) as Valli- Tamil
- 2000-2001 Anandha Bhavan (Sun TV as Keerthana - Tamil
- 2002-2005 Metti Oli (Sun TV) as Dhanam - Tamil
- 2002-2006 Rudhraveenai (Sun TV) as Dasi Maali - Tamil
- 2006 Malargal (Sun TV) as Padmini
- 2006-2007 Surya (Sun TV) as Lakshmikandham - Tamil
- 2008Kasthuri (Sun TV) - Tamil
- 2009 Arasi (Sun TV) as Ranjini - Tamil
- 2009-2013 Thangam (Sun TV) as Ilavanji - Tamil
- 2010 Meera (Star Vijay) as Shantha - Tamil
- 2010-2011 Kodi Mullai (Raj TV) - Tamil
- 2010-2012 Vilakku Vacha Nerathula (Kalaignar TV) - Tamil
- 2013-2014 Vamsam (Sun TV) as Chinnaponnu - Tamil
