= Kaani (film) =

- Directed by: Abhinav Velagaleti
- Written by: Vara Prasad - Rambabu (dialogues)
- Screenplay by: Abhinav Velagaleti
- Produced by: Chandranath C. C Mahendranadh (presents)
- Starring: Sai Kiran; Meera; Jyoti
- Cinematography: SD John
- Music by: Sashi Kumar
- Production company: Creative Minds
- Release date: 26 November 2004
- Country: India
- Language: Telugu

Kaani (transl. But) is a 2004 Indian Telugu-language thriller film directed by Abhinav Velagaleti and starring Sai Kiran, Meera and Jyoti. The film is based on The Sixth Sense (1999) and Darna Mana Hai (2003). The film released to unanimous negative reception.

== Cast ==
- Sai Kiran as Karthik
- Meera as Priya
- Jyoti as Anjali
- Rithi as Madhu
- Sameer as Ghost
- Preeti Nigam as Lakshmini
- Karan as Siddhi
- Ramjagan as Nani Babu
- Gokina Rama Rao as Professor
- Narasimha Raju as Madhu's father

== Reception ==
A critic from Sify wrote that "The director throws open a world full of ghosts and other super naturals without giving the audience any fright!" and added that "The story and screenplay has no nativity and the narration is low paced". Jeevi of Idlebrain.com wrote that "Over all, it is an unappealing free make of The Sixth Sense". A critic from Indiaglitz wrote that "Kaani, on the whole, ends up as a funny sort of film, which in the context of its genre and intent, is a major failing".
