= Allari Krishnayya =

1987 Telugu film directed by Nandamuri Ramesh

- Theatrical release poster
- Directed by: Nandamuri Ramesh
- Written by: Satyanand (dialogues)
- Screenplay by: Nandamuri Ramesh
- Story by: Gopi
- Produced by: C. H. Satyanarayana; S. Bhaskar
- Starring: Nandamuri Balakrishna; Bhanupriya
- Cinematography: Nandamuri Mohana Krishna
- Edited by: Kotagiri Venkateswara Rao
- Music by: Chakravarthy
- Production company: Vanitha Arts
- Release date: 26 February 1987
- Running time: 140 minutes
- Country: India
- Language: Telugu

Allari Krishnayya (transl. Naughty Krishnayya) is a 1987 Telugu-language film directed by Nandamuri Ramesh. Nandamuri Balakrishna, Bhanupriya play the lead roles with music composed by Chakravarthy. It was produced by C. H. Satyanarayana and S. Bhaskar under the Vanitha Arts banner.

== Plot ==
The film is set in a peaceful village governed by Narasayya and his nephew Madhavayya, who are known for their fair judgments. The two families share a close relationship. Krishnayya, Madhavayya's younger brother, is a brave and loyal man who deeply respects his brother and sister-in-law, Savitri. He falls in love with Lalitha, Narasayya's daughter, and they become engaged.

However, the village is troubled by two corrupt individuals, Veerabhadrayya and Karanam Kanakayya, who commit various atrocities. As the Panchayat elections approach, a division arises between Narasayya and Madhavayya as they support different candidates. This rift is exploited by the villains, leading to a rivalry between the two families. Karanam Kanakayya plots to marry Lalitha to Veerabhadrayya's son, Sundaram, but Krishnayya intervenes and marries her instead, further straining relations with Madhavayya.

When the village's annual festival approaches, previously overseen by both Narasayya and Madhavayya, Krishnayya takes charge and manages to convince them to cooperate. The villains attempt to sabotage the event by stealing the temple jewels and framing Narasayya. In the end, Krishnayya exposes the truth, clears Narasayya’s name, and defeats the wrongdoers. The film concludes with the reunion of the family.

== Cast ==
- Nandamuri Balakrishna as Gopala Krishna
- Bhanupriya as Lalitha
- Rao Gopal Rao as Narasayya
- Jaggayya as Madhavayya
- Gollapudi Maruti Rao as Karanam Kanakayya
- Mikkilineni as Dharmayya
- Chalapathi Rao as Veerabhadram
- Sudhakar as Sundaram
- Arun Kumar as Raja
- Raj Varma as Seshu
- Manik Irani as Jimbo
- P. J. Sarma as Collector
- Malladi as Priest
- Gokina Rama Rao as Papa Rao
- Chitti Babu as Chitti
- Ramana Reddy
- Jagga Rao
- Jayanthi as Savitri
- Annapurna as Purna
- Kalpana Rai as Pankajam
- Y. Vijaya as Chitrangi

== Soundtrack ==
Allari Krishnayya

Soundtrack album by Chakravarthy
- Released: 1987
- Genre: Feature film soundtrack
- Length: 20:18
- Label: Saptaswar Audio
- Producer: Chakravarthy

Chakravarthy chronology
Bhargava Ramudu (1987)	Allari Krishnayya (1987)	Sahasa Samrat (1987)

The music was composed by K. Chakravarthy with lyrics written by Veturi. The soundtrack was released by Saptaswar Audio Company.

S. No.	Song title	Singers	length
1	"Ashadam Vacchindhi"	S. P. Balasubrahmanyam, S. Janaki	4:25
2	"Tholi Vennela"	S. P. Balasubrahmanyam, P. Susheela	3:50
3	"Banthi Pula Bavayya"	S. P. Balasubrahmanyam, S. Janaki	3:22
4	"Neeki Naaki Dosti"	S. P. Balasubrahmanyam, S. P. Sailaja	3:35
5	"Jinjinakkadi"	S. P. Balasubrahmanyam	5:06

== Other ==
- VCDs and DVDs were released by VOLGA Videos, Hyderabad.
