= Satta (2004 film) =

- Official poster
- Directed by: Pavan
- Written by: Dakshin (dialogues)
- Screenplay by: Pavan; Dakshin
- Story by: Pavan
- Produced by: Janjanam Subba Rao
- Starring: Sai Kiran; Madhurima; Kota Srinivasa Rao
- Cinematography: Ramana Salva
- Edited by: Koganti Srinivasa Rao
- Music by: Suresh
- Release date: 12 March 2004
- Country: India
- Language: Telugu

Satta is a 2004 Indian Telugu-language action drama film directed by Pavan starring Sai Kiran, Madhurima and Kota Srinivasa Rao. The film is a remake of the Hollywood film Heist (2001).

== Cast ==
- Sai Kiran as Chakravarthy
- Madhurima as Madhu
- Kota Srinivasa Rao as MLA Samba Siva Rao
- Costumes Krishna as a minister
- Banerjee
- Ali
- Gautam Raju
- Lakshmipati
- Raghunatha Reddy

== Soundtrack ==
Music by Suresh. The film's audio launch was held on 28 November 2003.

== Reception ==
Jeevi of Idlebrain.com rated the film two out of five and said that "'Satta' is a below-average action oriented mass film". A critic from Sify said that "There are no redeeming factors and technically the film is below average. Most of the time the makers resorts to cliched and slapdash action".
