= Devanthakudu (1984 film) =

1984 film by S. A. Chandrasekhar

- Theatrical release poster
- Directed by: S. A. Chandrasekhar
- Written by: Thotapalli Madhu (dialogues)
- Screenplay by: S. A. Chandrasekhar
- Produced by: G. V. Narayana Rao
- Starring: Chiranjeevi; Vijayashanti
- Cinematography: M Kesavan
- Edited by: Gowtham Raju
- Music by: J. V. Raghavulu
- Production company: Damayanthi Art Productions
- Release date: 12 April 1984
- Country: India
- Language: Telugu

Devanthakudu is a 1984 Indian Telugu-language action crime drama film directed by S. A. Chandrasekhar. The film stars Chiranjeevi and Vijayashanti. It is a remake of Chandrasekhar's own 1983 Kannada film Geluvu Nannade. The film was released on 12 April 1984 and emerged as a commercial success.

== Plot ==
Vijay Kumar, a daring and dashing college student with a penchant for betting and challenges, is dared by his friend Chanti to commit the perfect crime—killing a professor and escaping without leaving any evidence. Vijay initially treats it as a joke and pretends to go through with it. However, when the professor is found dead, Vijay is wrongfully accused of the murder. The rest of the plot follows Vijay's struggle to clear his name and uncover the true identity of the killer and the motive behind the crime.

== Cast ==
- Chiranjeevi as Vijay
- Vijayashanti as Santhi
- G. V. Narayana Rao as Chanti
- Gollapudi Maruti Rao as Ramanujam
- Gummadi as Prabhakar Rao
- Annapurna as Vijay's mother
- Gokina Rama Rao as Dharmaraju
- Rohini as Lalitha
- S. Varalakshmi as Radha
- Samyuktha
- Chitti Babu as Vijay's college mate
- Hari
- P.J. Sarma as Judge
- Kota Srinivasa Rao
- Silk Smitha as Dancer in Nekubusam song

== Production ==
=== Development ===
Devanthakudu was produced by actor G. V. Narayana Rao under the Damayanthi Arts banner, named after his mother. Following the success of Chattaaniki Kallu Levu (1981), directed by S. A. Chandrasekhar and starring Chiranjeevi, both Chiranjeevi and Chandrasekhar became highly sought after. When Narayana Rao planned to produce a new film, Chiranjeevi agreed to star in it without even hearing the story, demonstrating his confidence in the producer.

During the making of the Kannada film Geluvu Nannade (1983), starring Ambareesh and Kannada Prabhakar, Chandrasekhar narrated the film's story to Narayana Rao. Impressed by the basic premise, Narayana Rao acquired the Telugu remake rights. However, the Kannada version was a box-office failure even before the Telugu version began filming, leading Chandrasekhar to suggest abandoning the remake. Nevertheless, Narayana Rao was determined to proceed with the story and enlisted the help of Thotapalli Madhu and Siva Nageswara Rao to make necessary alterations for the Telugu adaptation. The original Kannada version featured two heroes, but this was changed in the Telugu version.

=== Cast and crew ===
Vijayashanti, who was an emerging actress at the time, was cast as the lead actress in Devanthakudu after impressing Narayana Rao with her performance in Pelli Chesi Choopistaam (1983). This marked her first role as the primary heroine opposite Chiranjeevi, though she had previously been the second lead in Sangharshana (1983). The casting of Gokina Rama Rao as the antagonist Dharmaraj was a notable decision. Initially, Rao Gopal Rao was considered for the role, but concerns about the demanding night scenes led to the selection of Rama Rao.

Thotapalli Madhu, a playwright from Vijayawada, made his debut as a screenwriter with Devanthakudu. Narayana Rao, who had come across Madhu's plays, offered him the opportunity after acquiring the remake rights of the Kannada film. Madhu's remuneration for the film was ₹12,500. The film's success established him as a writer, and he went on to work on 193 films over the next 25 years. Siva Nageswara Rao, who assisted in the story development, collaborated closely with Narayana Rao and Madhu during the script discussions, often working late into the night. Although they considered dropping the subject due to the failure of the Kannada version, Narayana Rao's persistence led them to refine the story further.

=== Filming ===
The film's production commenced at the end of October 1983, with the talkie portion completed in 22 days at Sarathi Studios and Hyderabad Public School. Chiranjeevi had suffered a ligament tear during the shooting of Sangharshana, requiring him to travel to London for treatment. As a result, the filming of the songs was delayed by five months, with the remaining songs shot in Madras.

== Soundtrack ==
The soundtrack was composed by J. V. Raghavulu, with lyrics by Veturi, Gopi and Jyothirmayi.

Track listing
No.	Title	Lyrics	Singer(s)	Length
1.	"Chellammaku Pellanta"	Gopi	S. P. Balasubrahmanyam, S. P. Sailaja
2.	"Chilakocchi Kodutunte Chirubugga"	Veturi	S. P. Balasubrahmanyam, S. P. Sailaja
3.	"Gadiyako Kowgilintha"	Veturi	S. P. Balasubrahmanyam, P. Susheela
4.	"Chellammaku Pellanta" (pathos)	Gopi	S. P. Balasubrahmanyam
5.	"Aakesi"	Jyothirmayi	S. P. Balasubrahmanyam, S. Janaki
6.	"Nekubusam"	Veturi	S. P. Balasubrahmanyam

== Release ==
Devanthakudu was released on 12 April 1984. It was made on a budget of ₹22 lakh (equivalent to ₹3.4 crore or US$360,000 in 2023). Devanthakudu was a commercial success, bringing profits to all parties involved.
