= Sahasam (1992 film) =

- Directed by: Suresh Krishna
- Screenplay by: Suresh Krishna
- Story by: Vennelakanti
- Produced by: M. V. Rao
- Starring: Jagapathi Babu; Bhanu Chander; Saranya; Kaveri
- Cinematography: P. S. Prakash
- Edited by: Dandamudi Rajgopal
- Music by: M. M. Keeravani
- Production company: Sridevi Productions
- Release date: 27 March 1992
- Running time: 125 minutes
- Country: India
- Language: Telugu

Sahasam (transl. Adventure) is a 1992 Indian Telugu-language action film produced by M. V. Rao and directed by Suresh Krishna. It stars Jagapathi Babu, Bhanu Chander, Saranya and Kaveri, with music composed by M. M. Keeravani.

== Plot ==
The film begins with two stout-hearted cops, Bhanu & Chandu, who thwart the felonious deeds of MLA Maruthi Rao and his sibling Sanjay. Ongoing, they find their love interest, Usha, the daughter of Commissioner Prabhakar & Rekha, a lecturer. Once Rekha spots an alleged offense of Sanjay and gets ahead as a witness. Ergo, Sanjay burns Rekha alive when Chandu outbursts on Sanjay and slaughters her. Now, Bhanu has begun an investigation, but black guards have smashed accumulated attests. Hence, enraged Bhanu knocks out the lawbreakers by hanging them publicly. At last, the judiciary acquits Bhanu as proof is absent. Finally, the movie ends with Bhanu persistently doing his duty.

== Cast ==
- Jagapathi Babu as Inspector Chandu
- Bhanu Chander as Inspector Bhanu
- Saranya as Rekha
- Kaveri as Usha
- Gollapudi Maruthi Rao as MLA Maruthi Rao
- Nassar as Sanjay
- Chandra Mohan as C.M. Ram Mohan Rao
- Prabhakar Reddy as Lawyer
- Ranganath as Commissioner Prabhakar
- Giri Babu as Chencal Rao
- Rallapalli as Constable Venkata Swamy
- Sakshi Ranga Rao
- Thalapathy Dinesh as Sanjay's henchman
- Misro as Journalist Gandhi
- Chitti Babu as Gopi
- Kallu Chidambaram
- Annapurna
- Radha Kumari
- Anitha

== Production ==
During the shooting of the film, Jagapathi Babu was not fed by the crew for seven days.

== Soundtrack ==
Music composed by M. M. Keeravani. Music released on SURYA Audio Company.

Song Title	lyrics	Singers	length
"Sahasam"	Veturi	S. P. Balasubrahmanyam, Mano	3:37
"Happy Happy Day"	Vennelakanti	S. P. Balasubrahmanyam, Chitra	3:52
"Ee Bharata Kandam"	Vennelakanti	S. P. Balasubrahmanyam	3:05
"Mayadari Mogudandi"	Vennelakanti	M.M.Keeravani, Chitra	3:45
"Kokalura"	Vennelakanti	S. P. Balasubrahmanyam, Chitra, M.M.Keeravani	4:40
