= Sai Kiran =

Indian actor

- Born: 8 May 1978 (age 48); Hyderabad, India
- Other names: SKR, Sai Kiran Ram
- Occupation: Actor
- Years active: 2000–present
- Spouse: Sravanthi Saikiran
- Parent(s): Ramakrishna Vissamraju; Jyothi Vissamraju

Sai Kiran Vissamraju (born 8 May 1978), known professionally as Sai Kiran Ram, is an Indian actor who predominantly works in Telugu, Malayalam and Tamil Television serials along with several Telugu films.

== Personal life ==
Saikiran in 2024 wed his costar named Sravanthi.

His first appearance as Vishnu was in Shiva Leelalu, which was made during the golden days of Ushakiran movies, e.t.v.

== Filmography ==
- All films are in Telugu, unless otherwise noted.

Year	Film	Role	Notes	Ref.
2000	Nuvve Kavali	Prakash		
2001	Preminchu	Suresh		
2001	Raave Na Cheliya	Shekhar		
2001	Darling Darling	Kiran		
2002	Entha Bagundo	Sriram		
2002	Manasunte Chaalu	Hari		
2003	Hitech Students	Sai		
2003	Aadanthe Ado Type	Brinda's fiancé		
2003	Utsaaham	Vineeth		
2004	Kaani	Karthik		
2004	Pelli Kosam			
2004	Sardar Chinnappa Reddy			
2004	Satta	Chakravarthy		
2005	Jagapati			
2005	Devi Abhayam	Rahul		
2005	Manasa			
2006	Gopi – Goda Meeda Pilli	Kiran		
2007	Suvarna			
2009	Vengamamba	Venkateswara		
2009	Ajantha	Dr. Aravinth	Multilingual film	
2010	Ramdev			
2011	Ayudha Porattam	Sai	Tamil film	
2012	Bullabbai - Kantichooputho Champesthadu			
2012	Shirdi Sai	Vishnu, Rama and Krishna		
2012	Sri Vasavi Vaibhavam	Vishnuvardhana		
2013	Jagadguru Adi Shankara			
2014	Kshanam			
2014	Sri Vasavi Kanyaka Parameswari Charitra	Vishnu		
2014	Raamudu Kadu Krishnudu			
2014	Jagadguru Sri Kaasi Naaina Charithra			
2017	Tholi Kiranam			
2017	Sapthagiri LLB	Albert Pinto		
2017	Nakshatram	Police officer		
2022	Shiva Darshanam	Chakrapani Ranganathudu		
2022	Bimbisara	Vishwanandan Varma's elder son		
2022	Geetha	Bhagawan		
2022	Rowdy Inspector	Santosh	Bhojpuri film	

== Television ==
Year	Serial	Role	Channel	Language
2000	Sivaleelalu	Vishnu	ETV	Telugu
2007	Sri Narada Leelalu	Vishnu	Maa TV	Telugu
2010–2013	Thangam	Selvakannan	Sun TV	Tamil
2010–2011	Sundarakanda	Ajai	Gemini TV	Telugu
2010–2012	Srushti	Vishnu	SVBC TV	Telugu
2011–2013	Auto Bharathi	Aditya Ram	Gemini TV	Telugu
2012	Sudigundalu		Gemini TV	Telugu
2013–2017	Vamsam	Ponnurangam / S.S.Pandian	Sun TV	Tamil
2015	Surya Bhagawan	Surya	SVBC TV	
2016	Sree Narayana Theerthulu	Vishnu	SVBC TV	
2016	Venkateshwara Vaibhavam	Venkateshwara	SVBC TV	
2016	Thirupathamma Kadha	Krishna	SVBC TV	
2016	Puranakathalu	Vishnu	SVBC TV	
2016–2020	Koyilamma	Manoj Kumar	Maa TV	
2017–2020	Vanambadi	Mohan Kumar	Asianet	Malayalam
2019	Abhilasha	Vishnu Vardhan	Gemini TV	Telugu
2020–2021	Intiguttu	Ajay	Zee Telugu	Telugu
2020–2024	Guppedantha Manasu	Mahendra Bhushan	Star Maa	Telugu
2022	Wow 3	Contestant	ETV	Telugu
2022–2026	Padamati Sandhya Ragam	Raghu Ram	Zee Telugu	Telugu
2025	Bhanumathi	Bala Ram	Star Maa	Telugu
2026	Vasundhara	Prathap	ETV	Telugu

== Web series ==
Year	Show	Role	Notes
2023	Mandakini	Samrat Varma	Web series on Aha
2026	Nirudhyogi to CEO	Viswanath	Short Series on Chai Shots

== Awards and nominations ==
Year	Event	Category	Serial	result	Language
2016	Bullitera Awards 2016	Special jury	Koilamma	Won	Telugu
2017	Asianet Television Awards 2017	Best New Face Male	Vanambadi	Won	Malayalam
2017	StarmaaTelevision Awards 2017	Best Actor	koilamma	Won	Telugu
2017	Star maa Television Awards 2017	Best brother	koilamma	Won	Telugu
2018	Asianet Television Awards 2018	Most Popular Actor	Vanambadi	Won	Malayalam
2019	Asianet Television Awards 2019	Most Popular Actor	Vanambadi	Won	Malayalam
2019	VB entertainment Awards 2019	Best Actor	Koilamma	Won	Telugu
2021	TV9 entertainment Awards 2021	Best Actor	Guppedantha manasu	Won	Telugu
2021	Starmaa Parivaar Awards	Best Father	Guppedantha manasu	Won	Telugu
2022	Padmamohana TV Awards 2021	Best Actor	Guppedantha manasu	Won	Telugu
2023	Padmamohana TV Awards 2022	Special Jury	Guppedantha manasu	Won	Telugu
2023	StarMaa Parivaar Awards	Best Father	Guppedantha manasu	Won	Telugu
2023	Zee Telugu Kutumbam Awards	Best Husband	Padamati Sandhya Ragam	Won	Telugu
2024	Zee Telugu Kutumbam Awards	Best Hero	Padamati Sandhya Ragam	Won	Telugu
2025	Zee Telugu Kutumbam Awards	Evergreen Couple Janaki-Raghuram	Padamati Sandhya Ragam	Won	Telugu
