= Thoovalsparsham =

- Poster
- Directed by: Kamal
- Written by: Kaloor Dennis
- Produced by: Evershine Productions
- Starring: Jayaram; Mukesh; Sai Kumar; Suresh Gopi; Ranjini; Uravashi
- Cinematography: Saloo George
- Edited by: K. Shankunni
- Music by: Ouseppachan
- Release date: 1990
- Country: India
- Language: Malayalam

Thoovalsparsham (transl. Feather touch) is a 1990 Indian Malayalam-language comedy film directed by Kamal and written by Kaloor Dennis. The film stars Jayaram, Mukesh, Sai Kumar and Suresh Gopi. It was inspired by the 1987 American film Three Men and a Baby, which itself was based on the 1985 French film Three Men and a Cradle. Thoovalsparsham was remade in Telugu in 1990 as Chinnari Muddula Papa and twice in Tamil - in 1991 as Thayamma, in 2001 as Asathal and lastly a Hindi remake Heyy Babyy in 2007.

== Plot ==
Three bachelors, Unnikrishnan, Boney and Vinod live together in a shared apartment. They party and drink frequently, which their neighbour, Anantha Padmanabhan, complains about. One day, while Boney is away, Unnikrishnan and Vinod find a baby girl left on their doorstep, with a note asking them to care for the child. They hide the baby in order to cover up for Boney, since they suspect that it is his illegitimate child. When Boney returns, they hand over the baby to him and expect him to take care of her. However, Boney confesses that he has never had any affair and that the baby is not his.

The three friends then conclude that the girl is an orphan and try to abandon the child but fail. They hand her to a man who claims he will take her abroad, only to find out that he is a fraud. They fight him and get the baby back. Since they know nothing about raising babies, they hire Shishubalan, who is a baby sitter, to help them do so. Eventually, they embrace their roles as the guardians of the baby, whom they name Kingini.

A few weeks later, an old man visits them and tells them that the child is the illegitimate daughter of his daughter Maya and their neighbor, Anantha Padmanabhan. The baby was mistakenly placed in front of the bachelors apartment. Maya now desperately wants her daughter back, but the trio are unwilling to return her since they are now very attached to her. The trio then uncover surprising secrets about the relationship between Anantha and Maya and bring them back together. Finally, realizing that the best place for the child is with her parents, they hand over Kingini. After she leaves, the trio realizes how desperately they miss her.

== Cast ==
- Jayaram as Unnikrishnan / Unni
- Mukesh as Boney
- Sai Kumar as Vinod
- Suresh Gopi as Anantha Padmanabhan
- Baby Farzeena Bai as Kingini
- Urvashi as Maya, Kingini's real mother.
- Ranjini as Sujatha, Unnikrishnan's love interest & Unnithan's daughter
- Innocent as Sisupalan, Kingini's babysitter.
- Mamukkoya as Moosa / Moosaka
- Oduvil Unnikrishnan as Unnithan
- Sukumari as Anantha Padmanabhan's mother
- Bahadoor as Maya's father
- Paravoor Bharathan as veterinary doctor
- Valsala Menon as Unnithan's wife
- Santhakumari as Mother Superior
- Usha as Vinod's fiancée
- Kunjikkuttan Thampuran as Vinod's uncle
- James as child broker

== Soundtrack ==
The film's soundtrack contains 4 songs, all composed by Ouseppachan and Lyrics by Kaithapram.

Title	Singer(s)
"Manathe Palkadavil"	K. J. Yesudas, Chorus
"Kannippeeli (M)"	K. J. Yesudas
"Kannippeeli (F)"	K. S. Chitra
"Mandrajaalakam"	Unni Menon
