= Bhargava Ramudu =

- Theatrical release poster
- Directed by: A. Kodandarami Reddy
- Written by: Paruchuri Brothers(dialogues)
- Screenplay by: A. Kodandarami Reddy
- Story by: Kommanapalli Ganapathi Rao
- Produced by: S. Jaya Rama Rao; Rao Gopal Rao(Presents)
- Starring: Nandamuri Balakrishna; Vijayashanti
- Cinematography: Nandamuri Mohana Krishna
- Edited by: Kotagiri Venkateswara Rao
- Music by: Chakravarthy
- Production company: Jaya Productions
- Release date: 14 January 1987
- Running time: 149 minutes
- Country: India
- Language: Telugu

Bhargava Ramudu is a 1987 Indian Telugu-language action film produced by S. Jaya Rama Rao under the Jaya Productions banner, presented by Rao Gopal Rao and directed by A. Kodandarami Reddy. It stars Nandamuri Balakrishna, Vijayashanti and music composed by Chakravarthy.

== Cast ==
- Nandamuri Balakrishna as Bhargav
- Vijayashanti as Latha
- Mandakini as Roja
- Rao Gopal Rao as DIG Pratap Rao
- Jaggayya as Chief Engineer Bhanogi Rao
- Gollapudi Maruti Rao as Minister Raja Shekaram
- Paruchuri Gopala Krishna as Minister's Brother
- Chandra Mohan as Shankaram
- Ranganath as Tagore
- Kota Srinivasa Rao as Sadanandam
- Chalapathi Rao as Kallu Dasu
- P. J. Sarma
- Suthi Velu as Anjineelu
- Mallikarjuna Rao as Customs Officer
- MVS Harinath Rao as DEO
- Hema Sundar
- Bhimiswara Rao as Janardhan
- Jaya Bhaskar as Doctor
- Eeswar Rao as Asst Engineer
- Ramana Reddy as Kallu Dasu's son
- Chitti Babu
- Annapurna as Parvathi
- Mucharlla Aruna as Padma
- Mahija as typist
- Rekha

== Soundtrack ==
Bhargava Ramudu

Film score by Chakravarthy
- Released: 1987
- Genre: Soundtrack
- Length: 25:29
- Label: AVM Audio
- Producer: Chakravarthy

Chakravarthy chronology
Apoorva Sahodarudu (1986)	Bhargava Ramudu (1987)	Allari Krishnaiah (1987)

Music composed by Chakravarthy. Lyrics written by Veturi. Music released on AVM Audio Company.

No.	Title	Singer(s)	Length
1.	"Anando Brahma"	S. P. Balasubrahmanyam, S. Janaki	3:51
2.	"Maghamasamelavache Manmadha"	S. P. Balasubrahmanyam, P. Susheela	4:20
3.	"Manmadhanama Samvatsaram"	S. P. Balasubrahmanyam, P. Susheela	4:30
4.	"Vayyarama Nee Yavvaramemi"	S. P. Balasubrahmanyam, S. Janaki	4:18
5.	"Allukora Andagada"	S. P. Balasubrahmanyam, P. Susheela	4:15
6.	"Kalame Thalamai"	S. Janaki, S. P. Sailaja	4:15
