= Asathal =

2001 film by P. Vasu

- Title card
- Directed by: P. Vasu
- Written by: P. Vasu
- Produced by: S. Rajaram
- Starring: Sathyaraj; Ramya Krishnan; Swathi
- Cinematography: B. Kannan
- Edited by: P. Mohanraj
- Music by: Bharadwaj
- Production company: Mala Cine Creations
- Release date: 18 May 2001
- Running time: 138 minutes
- Country: India
- Language: Tamil

Asathal (transl. Wackiness) is a 2001 Indian Tamil-language comedy film written and directed by P. Vasu. The film stars Sathyaraj and Ramya Krishnan. Produced by Mala Cine Creations and featuring music composed by Bharadwaj, the film was released on 18 May 2001. It is a remake of the 1990 Malayalam film Thoovalsparsham which was earlier remade in Tamil as Thayamma.

== Cast ==
- Sathyaraj as Vetri
- Ramya Krishnan as Gowri
- Swathi as Catherine
- Vadivelu as Venugopal
- Ramesh Khanna as Victor
- Ajay Rathnam as Jayaraj
- Manivannan as Lawyer

Babilona as Vadivelu lover

== Production ==
The film was produced by S. Rajaram, a theatre owner and film distributor under his production house Mala Cine Combines. He signed on P. Vasu to write and direct the comedy film, with the director collaborating with Sathyaraj again after several previous successful ventures. Scenes which showed the characters in a house were filmed in a bungalow at Neelankarai, Chennai. The filming was completed within 37 days. Sathyaraj worked on Asathal alongside two other ventures Kunguma Pottu Gounder and the later-shelved Mr. Narathar.

== Soundtrack ==
The music was composed by Bharadwaj.

Song	Singers	Lyrics
"Ithu Meiyya Poiyya"	Srinivas	Gangai Amaran
"Raja Vazhkai Endral"	Mano	Snehan
"Saainthaadu"	Anuradha Sriram S. P. Balasubrahmanyam	Kalaikumar
"Shock Adicha Mathiri"	Ganga, Tippu	Gangai Amaran
"Velli Velli Mathappu"	P. Unnikrishnan	Gangai Amaran

== Reception ==
Malathi Rangarajan of The Hindu gave the film a mixed review, noting that "Certain scenes are too contrived - the aim is humour but they only tend to irritate", while adding "the screenplay is fast-paced, the dialogue is crisp, it is the story that lags behind". Visual Dasan of Kalki panned the humour and music and added that one could have openly appreciated Vasu if he had remade Malayalam film Thoovalsparsham as it is. Malini Mannath of Chennai Online noted "A full-length comedy, the narration is fast-paced, the script crisp, and it manages to hold one's attention for the most part."
