= Punadhirallu =

- Theatrical release poster
- Directed by: Gudapati Rajkumar
- Produced by: Kranthi Kumar
- Starring: Gokina Rama Rao; Chiranjeevi; Ali; Roja Ramani; Savitri; Narasimha Raju; Kavitha
- Cinematography: P. S. Nivas
- Music by: Jakkula.Premji
- Release date: 21 June 1979
- Country: India
- Language: Telugu

Punadhirallu (English: Foundation Stones) is a 1979 Indian Telugu-language film directed by Rajkumar. It was the debut film of actor Chiranjeevi. The film won three Nandi Awards, including for the Best Feature Film and Best Actor (Gokina Rama Rao) categories. Chiranjeevi started his film career with Punadhirallu. However, his first released film was Pranam Khareedu.

== Cast ==
- Narasimha Raju as Ravi
- Savitri as Sarpanch's wife, Anasuya
- Kavitha as Radha
- Rojaramani as Santhi
- Chiranjeevi
- Gokina Rama Rao as Sarpanch Raghuramayya
- K.V. Chalam

== Soundtrack ==
- "Bharata Desapu Bhavi Pourulam"
- "Chiru Chiru Navvula"
- "Yatha Vesi Posina Yeru"

== Awards ==
Nandi Awards - 1979

- Third Best Feature Film - Bronze - Kranthi Kumar
- Best Actor - Gokina Rama Rao
- Best Story Writer - Dharma Vijayam
