= Gokina Rama Rao =

Indian actor

- Born: Unguturu, Krishna district, India
- Died: Hyderabad, Telangana, India
- Occupation: Actor
- Years active: 1972-??
- Awards: Nandi Award for Punadirallu movie

Gokina Rama Rao is an Indian film, character actor, known for his works in Telugu cinema.

== Awards ==
Nandi Awards

- Nandi Award for Best Actor – Punadhirallu (1979)

== Selected filmography ==
Year	Title	Role	Notes
1973	Manchi Vallaki Manchivadu		
1973	Doctor Babu	Sambhulu	
1975	Bhagasthulu	Engineer	
1976	Raaja	C.I.D. Inspector Rama Rao	
1976	Alludochadu	Mukunda Rao	
1977	Chillara Kottu Chittemma		
1978	Dongala Dopidi	Sangarasinga Maharaju	
1979	President Peramma		
1979	Cheyyethi Jai Kottu	Ranganatham	
1979	Punadhirallu	Sarpanch Raghuramaiah	
1979	Rangoon Rowdy		
1979	Seethe Ramudaithe	Kuppuswamy	
1979	Urvasi Neeve Naa Preyasi	Venkatrathnam	
1979	Samajaniki Saval	Raju	
1980	Badai Basavayya	Gorrela Basavayya	
1981	Maro Kurukshetram		
1983	Maro Mayabazar		
1984	Mangammagari Manavadu		
1984	Dandayatra		
1984	Palnati Puli	Kannaiah	
1984	Devanthakudu	Dharmaraju	
1985	Palnati Simham	Chakrapani	
1985	Intiko Rudramma	Superintendent of Police	
1986	Kirayi Mogudu	Bhujangam	
1986	Papikondalu		
1986	Tatayya Kankanam		
1986	Driver Babu	Public Prosecutor	
1987	Allari Krishnayya	Papa Rao	
1987	Pagabattina Panchali		
1988	Murali Krishnudu	Krishnaveni's father	
1988	Praja Pratinidhi	Pichaiah Dora	
1989	Gandipeta Rahasyam		
1989	Chennapatnam Chinnollu	Damodaram	
1990	Prema Khaidi	Bapineedu	
1991	Naa Pellam Naa Ishtam		
1991	Surya IPS	Ekambareswara Rao	
1992	Prema Vijetha		
1992	Antham		
1993	Kaliyugam		
1994	Jailor Gaari Abbayi	Ankineedu	
1994	Bobbili Simham		
1995	Maya Bazaar		
1996	Oho Naa Pellanta		
1997	Priyamaina Srivaru	Bhanu Prasad	
1997	Preminchukundam Raa		
1998	Yuvaratna Rana		
1998	Kanyadanam		
1998	Ganesh	Superintendent	
1999	Sultan		
1999	Rythu Rajyam		
2000	Ganapathi		
2001	Pandanti Samsaram		
2001	Dadagiri		
2004	Seshadri Naidu		
2004	Kaani		
2005	Sravanamasam		
2008	Ganapathi		
