= Basapur =

Basapur hidkal dam basapur
- Village
- Country: India
- State: Karnataka
- District: Belgaum
- Talukas: hukkeri

Government
  - Type: Panchayat raj

Population (2011)
  - Total: 13,000

Languages
  - Official: Kannada
- Time zone: UTC+5:30 (IST)
- PIN: 591122
- Telephone code: 08333-289198
- ISO 3166 code: IN-KA
- Vehicle registration: ka 49
- Nearest city: belgaum 38km
- Lok Sabha constituency: chikkodi
- Vidhan Sabha constituency: yamakanmardi
- Climate: dry air (Köppen)

Basapur is a village in Hukeri taluk, Belgaum district in the southern state of Karnataka, India.
